= Bureau Valley High School =

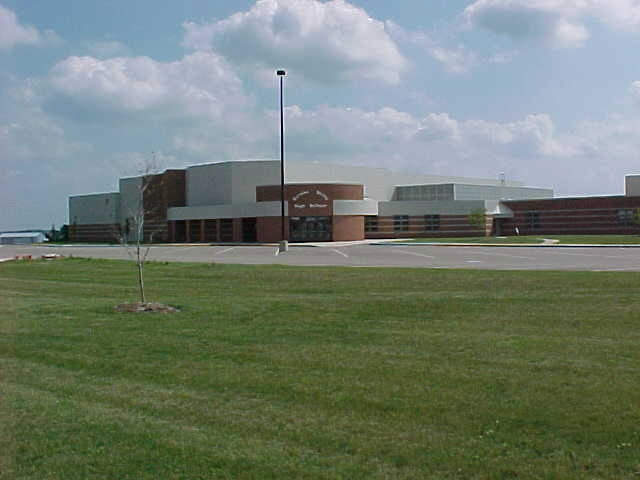

Location
- 9154 County Rd 2125 N Manlius, Illinois; United States; 41.4546°N 89.6817°W

Information
- Type: Public
- Established: 1995
- Locale: District #340
- Principal: Duane Price
- Superintendent: Jason Stabler
- Staff: 29.10 (FTE)
- Grades: 9-12
- Enrollment: 303 (2023–2024)
- Student to teacher ratio: 10.41
- Campus: Remote
- Colors: Navy Blue, Columbia Blue
- Mascot: Storm
- Website: www.bv340.org/o/bvhs

The Bureau Valley High School (BVHS) is a high school located at 9154 County Road 2125 North, in Manlius, Illinois. The high school is part of the Bureau Valley Community Unit School District #340. Bureau Valley was the first Illinois high school to construct and run a full-sized wind turbine. Students are from ten different villages (Bradford, Buda, Harmon, Manlius, New Bedford, Normandy, Sheffield, Thomas, Walnut, Wyanet), within three different area codes (815, 309, 779), and four separate counties (Bureau, Stark, Lee, and Whiteside).

Since July 1, 2001, the school is one of three options for students of Bradford Community Unit School District 1, which, after that date, no longer covered high school.

== History ==
In 1995, at the now Bureau Valley South (temporary BVHS campus), the name of the new school district was announced to the high school and communities. After a long, drawn-out light and fog show with the first track from Ridin' the Storm Out playing in the background, a sign revealing the name to be "Bureau Valley High School" was accepted positively by attendees.

From 1995 to 1997, Bureau Valley students attended school at the former Western High School. Three graduating classes studied in this building, which is now Bureau Valley South Elementary.

The Bureau Valley High School is located on a 36.5-acre (148,000 m^{2}) site in western Bureau Country, five miles (8 km) north of I-80, on the corner of Route 40 and 2125 N Ave in Manilus, IL. It is a central location of the 340-square-mile (880 km^{2}) district and is just under a 15-minute drive from anywhere in the community.

It is 103,830 square feet (9,646 m^{2}) with support for 450 students and a central commons. It also contains an 1,800 seat gymnasium, a 750-seat performing arts auditorium and a central media center. In the academic wing, there are thirty-one classrooms, twenty-three standard classrooms, two computer labs, two computer classrooms, three science labs, and one distance learning lab.

The faculty offices are located in the center of the wing, allowing the sharing of classrooms with flexibility for eight-block scheduling. The entire campus is equipped with fiber cabling, audio/video equipment built into every classroom, overhead projectors in most of the classrooms, and WiFi.

=== Wind turbine ===
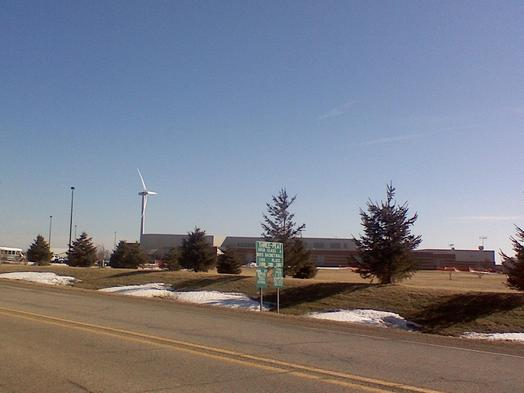
New Wind Turbine Behind School

In January 2005, Bureau Valley High School became the first Illinois high school to pioneer, construct, and run a turbine in their campus. This project was vision of the school board and Mr. Keith Bolin, a hog farmer who lives in the district and spent around two and a half years working to get this project approved and completed. The turbine can produce 660-kilowatts and is just over two hundred seventy feet tall.

Several grants provided a large portion of cost of the $1 million turbine. This included $331,000 from the Illinois Clean Energy Community Foundation and $150,000 from the Illinois Department of Commerce and Economic Opportunity. The balance was covered by a loan from Union Bank in October 2012 using tax-free bonds at a rate of 3.37% wind industry.

The turbine offsets the electricity consumption of the campus and extra energy will be sold back to Department of Energy at a rate of $0.03 per kilowatt-hour. This will result in a profit of $1.6 million after the loans are paid off but before the 20-year life expectancy ends. In its first seven months of operation the turbine's computer had shown that it has produced over 646,397 kilo-watt hours for the school. This amounts to approximately $100,000 worth of energy savings every year.

The construction was not without public disapproval. Noise, construction, and danger to birds were pivotal issues. Now that construction is finished, only one of these issues is still evident; a slight whisper from the back 100m on the school track.

The turbine is now a popular field trip destination, with students traveling from all over Illinois to study the turbine and its feasibility.

== Athletics ==
BVHS has been awarded Class A, 1A, or 2A depending on the sport in the Illinois High School Association. It belongs to the Three Rivers Conference. The school has one state championship on record in team athletics: Boys' Football in 2005-2006 (3A). The boys' and girls' cross country team are coached by Dale Donner, who is in the Illinois Track and Cross Country Hall of Fame.

BVHS athletics programs include:

- Baseball
- Boys' Basketball
- Boys' Track
- Girls' Track
- Boys' and Girls' Cross Country
- Football
- Girls' Basketball
- Golf
- Softball
- Volleyball
- Dance

== Clubs ==
BVHS participates in a variety of clubs including

- Drama
- Art
- Spanish
- Interact
- Student Council
- National Honor Society
- FFA

== Demographics ==
According to the Illinois State Board of Education, Bureau Valley High School has 99% Caucasian, <1% Hispanic, and <1% American Indian students. The average class size is nineteen students.
