= Bureau Township, Bureau County, Illinois =

Bureau Township
- Township
- Location in Bureau County

- Bureau County's location in Illinois
- Coordinates: 41°26′50″N 89°33′59″W
- Country: United States
- State: Illinois
- County: Bureau
- Established: November 6, 1849

Area
  - Total: 36.1 sq mi (93 km^{2})
  - Land: 36.1 sq mi (93 km^{2})
  - Water: 0 sq mi (0 km^{2}) 0%
- Elevation: 709 ft (216 m)

Population (2020)
  - Total: 278
  - Density: 7.70/sq mi (2.97/km^{2})
- Time zone: UTC-6 (CST)
  - Summer (DST): UTC-5 (CDT)
- ZIP codes: 61356, 61376, 61379
- FIPS code: 17-011-09668

Bureau Township is one of twenty-five townships in Bureau County, Illinois, US. As of the 2020 census, its population was 278 and it contained 126 housing units.

== Geography ==
According to the 2010 census, the township has a total area of 36.1 square miles (93 km^{2}), all land.

=== Cemeteries ===
Two cemeteries are located within the township:

- West Bureau Cemetery (also known as Cross Cemetery), near Wyanet
- Roggy Cemetery, near Walnut

=== Airports and landing strips ===
- Naffziger Landing Strip, near Limerick and Kasbeer

== Demographics ==
As of the 2020 census there were 278 people, 35 households, and 35 families residing in the township. The population density was 7.69 inhabitants per square mile (2.97/km^{2}). There were 126 housing units at an average density of 3.49 per square mile (1.35/km^{2}). The racial makeup of the township was 95.32% White, 0.00% African American, 0.36% Native American, 0.00% Asian, 0.00% Pacific Islander, 1.08% from other races, and 3.24% from two or more races. Hispanic or Latino of any race were 2.88% of the population.

There were 35 households, out of which 31.40% had children under the age of 18 living with them, 100.00% were married couples living together, 0.00% had a female householder with no spouse present, and none were non-families. No households were made up of individuals. The average household size was 2.29 and the average family size was 2.29.

The township's age distribution consisted of 12.5% under the age of 18, none from 18 to 24, 12.5% from 25 to 44, 13.8% from 45 to 64, and 61.3% who were 65 years of age or older. The median age was 74.1 years. For every 100 females, there were 77.8 males. For every 100 females age 18 and over, there were 100.0 males.

The median income for a household in the township was $75,795, and the median income for a family was $75,795. The per capita income for the township was $36,649.

Historical population
Census	Pop.	Note	%±
2010	247		—
2020	278		12.6%
U.S. Decennial Census

== School districts ==
- Bureau Valley Community Unit School District 340

== Political districts ==
- Illinois' 11th congressional district
- State House District 74
- State Senate District 37
