= La Moille High School =

Location
- 801 South Main Street; La Moille, Bureau County, Illinois 61330; United States
- Coordinates: 41.5240°N 89.2803°W

Information
- Type: Comprehensive Public High School
- School district: La Moille Community Unit School District 303
- Principal: Brent Ziegler
- Teaching staff: 11.25 (FTE)
- Grades: 9–12
- Enrollment: 84 (2023–2024)
- Student to teacher ratio: 7.47
- Campus type: Rural, fringe
- Colors: Red, white
- Athletics conference: Little Ten Conference
- Team name: Lions
- Website: La Moille Schools
- La Moille High School mascot

La Moille High School, or LHS, is a public four-year high school located at 801 South Main Street in La Moille, Illinois, a village in Bureau County, Illinois, in the Midwestern United States. LHS serves the community and the surrounding area of La Moille, Arlington, and Van Orin. The campus is located 30 miles northwest of Ottawa, Illinois, and serves a mixed village and rural residential community.

== Academics ==
Mr. McCrackin is Superintendent/Principal of LaMoille High School.

== Athletics ==
La Moille High School competes in the Little Ten Conference and is a member school in the Illinois High School Association. Their mascot is the Lions, with school colors of red and white. The school has no state championships on record in team athletics and activities.

Due to LHS's small enrollment, they cooperate with neighboring Amboy and Ohio high schools for most sports.

== History ==
La Moille High School has no known consolidations in the recent past. Surrounding communities may have possessed high schools at some time, which were consolidated into the current LHS. Potential reference/citation:
