= Hall Township, Bureau County, Illinois =

Hall Township
- Township
- Location in Bureau County

- Bureau County's location in Illinois
- Coordinates: 41°22′01″N 89°13′02″W
- Country: United States
- State: Illinois
- County: Bureau
- Established: November 6, 1849

Area
  - Total: 37.88 sq mi (98.1 km^{2})
  - Land: 37.22 sq mi (96.4 km^{2})
  - Water: 0.67 sq mi (1.7 km^{2}) 1.77%
- Elevation: 659 ft (201 m)

Population (2020)
  - Total: 8,258
  - Density: 221.9/sq mi (85.66/km^{2})
- Time zone: UTC-6 (CST)
  - Summer (DST): UTC-5 (CDT)
- ZIP codes: 61312, 61320, 61322, 61329, 61354, 61356, 61359, 61362
- FIPS code: 17-011-32265

Hall Township is one of twenty-five townships in Bureau County, Illinois, United States. As of the 2020 census, its population was 8,258 and it contained 3,777 housing units. Hall Township changed its name from Bloom Township in June 1850.

== Geography ==
According to the 2010 census, the township has a total area of 37.88 square miles (98.1 km^{2}), of which 37.22 square miles (96.4 km^{2}) (or 98.26%) is land and 0.67 square miles (1.7 km^{2}) (or 1.77%) is water.

=== Cities ===
- Dalzell (vast majority)
- De Pue (east edge)
- Ladd
- Seatonville (east three-quarters)
- Spring Valley

=== Unincorporated towns ===
- Marquette
- Ottville
- Webster Park

=== Cemeteries ===
The township contains eleven cemeteries:

- Ladd
- Lithuanian
- Miller
- Mount Olivet Catholic
- Ottville
- Saint Annes Catholic
- Saint George Syrian
- Saint Josephs
- Saint Valentines
- Saints Peter and Paul
- Valley Memorial Park

=== Major highways ===
- Interstate 80
- US Route 6
- Illinois Route 29
- Illinois Route 89

=== Airports and landing strips ===
- Saint Margarets Hospital Heliport
- Valley Airfield

=== Rivers ===
- Illinois River

=== Landmarks ===
- Kirby Park

== Demographics ==
As of the 2020 census there were 8,258 people, 3,334 households, and 2,127 families residing in the township. The population density was 217.95 inhabitants per square mile (84.15/km^{2}). There were 3,777 housing units at an average density of 99.69 per square mile (38.49/km^{2}). The racial makeup of the township was 83.11% White, 1.30% African American, 0.48% Native American, 0.94% Asian, 0.00% Pacific Islander, 5.86% from other races, and 8.31% from two or more races. Hispanic or Latino of any race were 15.15% of the population.

There were 3,334 households, out of which 26.80% had children under the age of 18 living with them, 48.92% were married couples living together, 9.66% had a female householder with no spouse present, and 36.20% were non-families. 30.40% of all households were made up of individuals, and 16.50% had someone living alone who was 65 years of age or older. The average household size was 2.27 and the average family size was 2.81.

The township's age distribution consisted of 20.4% under the age of 18, 8.2% from 18 to 24, 22.4% from 25 to 44, 28.1% from 45 to 64, and 20.8% who were 65 years of age or older. The median age was 43.8 years. For every 100 females, there were 99.8 males. For every 100 females age 18 and over, there were 96.0 males.

The median income for a household in the township was $51,740, and the median income for a family was $64,836. Males had a median income of $43,586 versus $21,817 for females. The per capita income for the township was $27,947. About 10.6% of families and 12.5% of the population were below the poverty line, including 21.1% of those under age 18 and 7.0% of those age 65 or over.

Historical population
| Census | Pop. | Note | %± |
|---|---|---|---|
| 2010 | 8,300 | | — |
| 2020 | 8,258 | | −0.5% |
US Decennial Census

== Political districts ==
- Illinois's 11th congressional district
- Spring Valley and part of Dalzell are in Illinois's 18th congressional district
- State House District 76
- State Senate District 38
