= Ohio Township, Bureau County, Illinois =

Township in the United States

Ohio Township
- Township
- Location in Bureau County

- Bureau County's location in Illinois
- Coordinates: 41°32′25″N 89°27′25″W
- Country: United States
- State: Illinois
- County: Bureau
- Established: November 6, 1849

Area
  - Total: 38.11 sq mi (98.7 km^{2})
  - Land: 38.1 sq mi (99 km^{2})
  - Water: 0.01 sq mi (0.026 km^{2}) 0.03%
- Elevation: 840 ft (256 m)

Population (2020)
  - Total: 814
  - Density: 21.4/sq mi (8.25/km^{2})
- Time zone: UTC-6 (CST)
  - Summer (DST): UTC-5 (CDT)
- ZIP codes: 61328, 61330, 61349, 61356
- FIPS code: 17-011-55392

Ohio Township is one of twenty-five townships in Bureau County, Illinois, United States. As of the 2020 census, its population was 814 and it contained 396 housing units. Ohio Township changed its name from Richland Township in June 1850.

== Geography ==
According to the 2010 census, the township has a total area of 38.11 square miles (98.7 km^{2}), of which 38.1 square miles (99 km^{2}) (or 99.97%) is land and 0.01 square miles (0.026 km^{2}) (or 0.03%) is water.

=== Villages ===
- Ohio

=== Unincorporated towns ===
- Kasbeer

=== Cemeteries ===
- Ohio
- Union

=== Major highways ===
- Illinois Route 26
- Illinois Route 92

=== Airports and landing strips ===
- Albrecht Airport
- Zea Mays Field

== Demographics ==
As of the 2020 census there were 814 people, 381 households, and 267 families residing in the township. The population density was 21.36 inhabitants per square mile (8.25/km^{2}). There were 396 housing units at an average density of 10.39 per square mile (4.01/km^{2}). The racial makeup of the township was 93.24% White, 0.37% African American, 0.25% Native American, 0.61% Asian, 0.12% Pacific Islander, 0.37% from other races, and 5.04% from two or more races. Hispanic or Latino of any race were 2.70% of the population.

There were 381 households, out of which 24.90% had children under the age of 18 living with them, 40.68% were married couples living together, 22.31% had a female householder with no spouse present, and 29.92% were non-families. 26.20% of all households were made up of individuals, and 16.00% had someone living alone who was 65 years of age or older. The average household size was 2.36 and the average family size was 2.73.

The township's age distribution consisted of 17.6% under the age of 18, 8.2% from 18 to 24, 23.1% from 25 to 44, 30% from 45 to 64, and 21.1% who were 65 years of age or older. The median age was 45.5 years. For every 100 females, there were 92.6 males. For every 100 females age 18 and over, there were 90.8 males.

The median income for a household in the township was $60,268, and the median income for a family was $61,771. Males had a median income of $44,783 versus $20,043 for females. The per capita income for the township was $32,995. About 0.7% of families and 8.8% of the population were below the poverty line, including none of those under age 18 and 10.2% of those age 65 or over.

Historical population
Census	Pop.	Note	%±
2010	823		—
2020	814		−1.1%
US Decennial Census

== School districts ==
- Ohio Consolidated Grade School District 17
- Ohio Community High School District 505

== Political districts ==
- Illinois's 16th congressional district
- State House District 74
- State Senate District 37
