= Buda, Illinois =

- Village
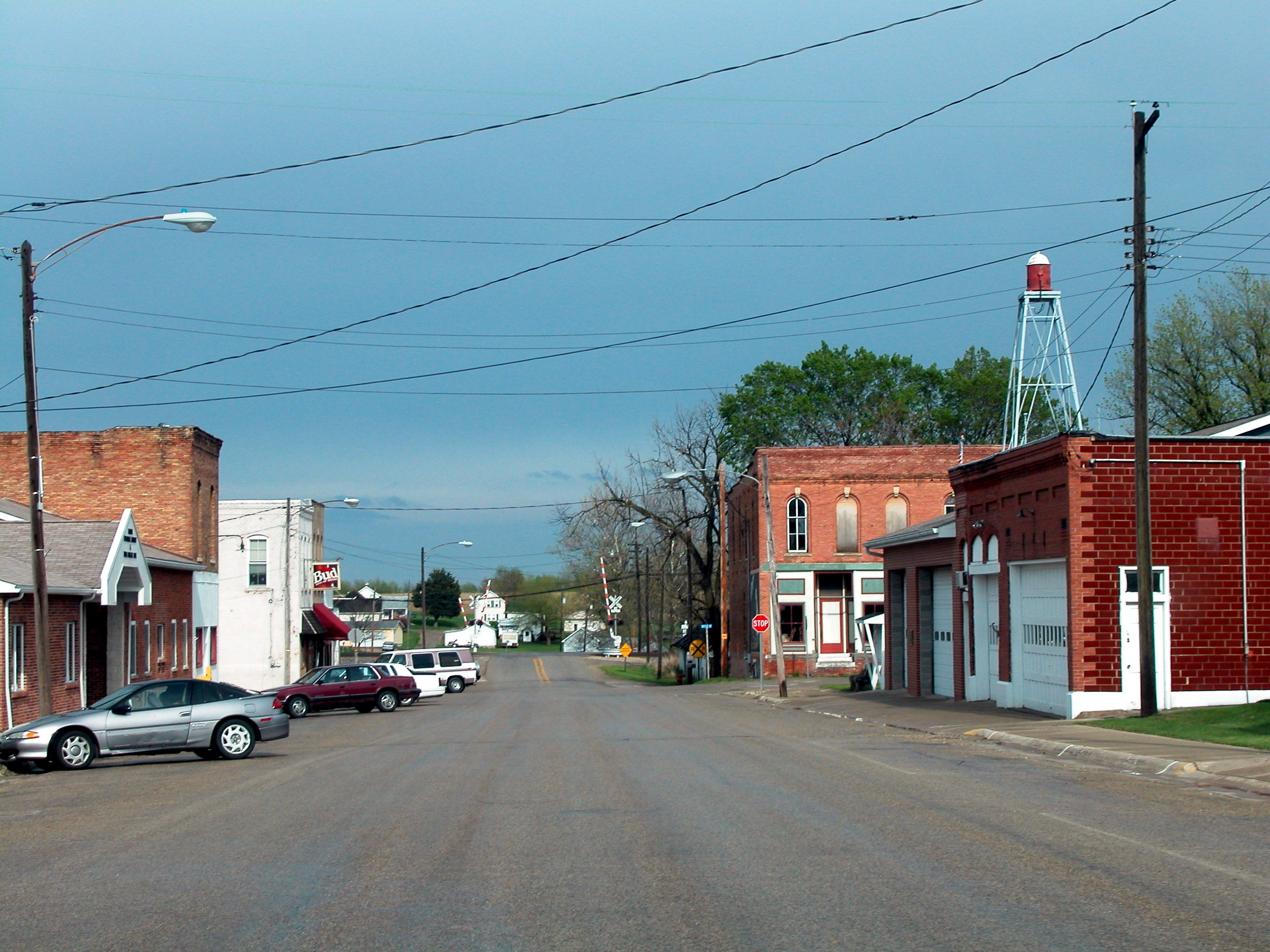
- Buda in 2003

- Location of Buda in Bureau County, Illinois.
- Coordinates: 41°19′44″N 89°40′45″W
- Country: US
- State: Illinois
- County: Bureau
- Township: Concord
- Founded: 1854
- Incorporated: 1869
- Named for: Buda, Hungary

Area
  - Total: 1.02 sq mi (2.63 km^{2})
  - Land: 1.02 sq mi (2.63 km^{2})
  - Water: 0 sq mi (0.00 km^{2})
- Elevation: 745 ft (227 m)

Population (2020)
  - Total: 482
  - Estimate (2024): 465 ▼
  - Density: 475.2/sq mi (183.46/km^{2})
- Time zone: UTC-6 (CST)
  - Summer (DST): UTC-5 (CDT)
- ZIP code: 61314
- Area code: 309
- FIPS code: 17-09356
- GNIS feature ID: 2397488

Buda /ˈbjuː.də/ is a village in Bureau County, Illinois, United States. The population was 482 at the 2020 census. It is part of the Ottawa Micropolitan Statistical Area.

== History ==
The village was named after Buda, now a part of Budapest, in Hungary. Buda was chosen in honor of the hometown of exiled Hungarian politician Louis Kossuth.

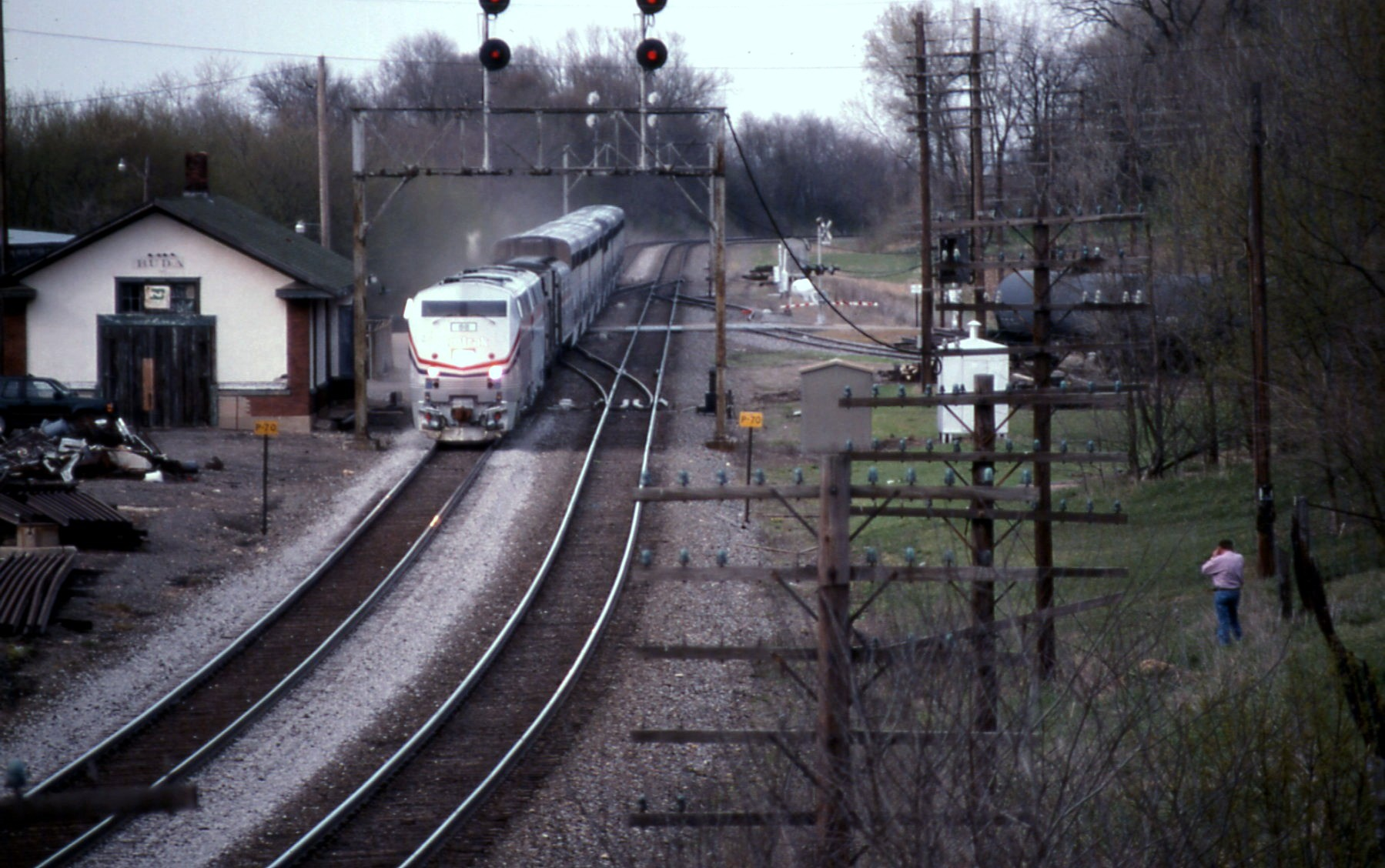
19970426 23 Amtrak, Buda, Illinois (5796617354)

Buda was established in 1854 to serve the Chicago, Burlington & Quincy Railroad. It displaced French Grove, Illinois, which had been the post office in the area before the establishment of Buda. Judge Jesse Emmerson and W. H. Bloom opened the first and second stores respectively in Buda. In 1955 Dr. Holoton became the first doctor in the community.

Buda was incorporated as a village in 1869.

An industrialist named George Chalender founded the Buda Engine Co. in Buda, Illinois, in 1910. The company relocated to Harvey, Illinois, before being acquired by Allis-Chalmers in 1953.

== Geography ==
According to the 2021 census gazetteer files, Buda has a total area of 1.01 square miles (2.62 km^{2}), of which 1.01 square miles (2.62 km^{2}) (or 100.00%) is land and 0.00 square miles (0.00 km^{2}) (or 0.00%) is water.

== Demographics ==
Historical population
| Census | Pop. | Note | %± |
|---|---|---|---|
| 1880 | 778 | | — |
| 1890 | 990 | | 27.2% |
| 1900 | 873 | | −11.8% |
| 1910 | 887 | | 1.6% |
| 1920 | 796 | | −10.3% |
| 1930 | 794 | | −0.3% |
| 1940 | 734 | | −7.6% |
| 1950 | 761 | | 3.7% |
| 1960 | 732 | | −3.8% |
| 1970 | 675 | | −7.8% |
| 1980 | 668 | | −1.0% |
| 1990 | 563 | | −15.7% |
| 2000 | 592 | | 5.2% |
| 2010 | 538 | | −9.1% |
| 2020 | 482 | | −10.4% |
U.S. Decennial Census

As of the 2020 census there were 482 people, 241 households, and 180 families residing in the village. The population density was 475.35 inhabitants per square mile (183.53/km^{2}). There were 239 housing units at an average density of 235.70 per square mile (91.00/km^{2}). The racial makeup of the village was 95.44% White, 1.04% Asian, 0.21% from other races, and 3.32% from two or more races. Hispanic or Latino of any race were 1.04% of the population.

There were 241 households, out of which 32.4% had children under the age of 18 living with them, 51.04% were married couples living together, 14.94% had a female householder with no husband present, and 25.31% were non-families. 20.33% of all households were made up of individuals, and 8.71% had someone living alone who was 65 years of age or older. The average household size was 2.81 and the average family size was 2.51.

The village's age distribution consisted of 26.1% under the age of 18, 8.1% from 18 to 24, 22.3% from 25 to 44, 33.3% from 45 to 64, and 10.4% who were 65 years of age or older. The median age was 39.8 years. For every 100 females, there were 88.8 males. For every 100 females age 18 and over, there were 89.0 males.

The median income for a household in the village was $42,250, and the median income for a family was $53,750. Males had a median income of $43,750 versus $31,250 for females. The per capita income for the village was $22,041. About 9.4% of families and 12.9% of the population were below the poverty line, including 4.4% of those under age 18 and 6.3% of those age 65 or over.

== Education ==
It is in the Bureau Valley Community Unit School District 340.

The communities of Buda and Sheffield combined to form the Western School District in 1960. The name came from the fact that the two towns are on the western side of Bureau County. In 1995 Buda and Sheffield again consolidated by joining school districts based in Manlius, Walnut, Wyanet to form the Bureau Valley School District.

== Media references ==
- Buda, Illinois is referenced in "They Are Night Zombies!! They Are Neighbors!! They Have Come Back from the Dead!! Ahhhh!" from Sufjan Stevens's 2005 album Illinois.

== Notable people ==
- Chick Hearn (1916–2002), Hall of Fame broadcaster; born in Buda
- Harry Trekell (1892–1965), pitcher for the St. Louis Cardinals; born in Buda
