= Lamoille Township, Bureau County, Illinois =

Lamoille Township
- Township
- Location in Bureau County

- Bureau County's location in Illinois
- Coordinates: 41°32′15″N 89°20′06″W
- Country: United States
- State: Illinois
- County: Bureau
- Established: November 6, 1849

Area
  - Total: 37.69 sq mi (97.6 km^{2})
  - Land: 37.67 sq mi (97.6 km^{2})
  - Water: 0.01 sq mi (0.026 km^{2}) 0.03%
- Elevation: 804 ft (245 m)

Population (2020)
  - Total: 1,010
  - Density: 26.8/sq mi (10.4/km^{2})
- Time zone: UTC-6 (CST)
  - Summer (DST): UTC-5 (CDT)
- ZIP codes: 61330, 61349, 61356, 61374
- GNIS feature ID: 0429227
- FIPS code: 17-011-41807

La Moille Township is one of twenty-five townships in Bureau County, Illinois, USA. As of the 2020 census, its population was 1,010 and it contained 475 housing units.

La Moille Township was named after the Lamoille River valley in Vermont.

== Geography ==
According to the 2010 census, the township has a total area of 37.69 square miles (97.6 km^{2}), of which 37.67 square miles (97.6 km^{2}) (or 99.95%) is land and 0.01 square miles (0.026 km^{2}) (or 0.03%) is water.

=== Cities ===
- La Moille (west three-quarters)

=== Unincorporated towns ===
- Van Orin

=== Cemeteries ===
The township contains four cemeteries:

- Greenfield
- North Prairie
- Union
- Van Orin Repose

=== Major highways ===
- US Route 34
- Illinois Route 89
- Illinois Route 92

== Demographics ==
As of the 2020 census there were 1,010 people, 430 households, and 287 families residing in the township. The population density was 26.81 inhabitants per square mile (10.35/km^{2}). There were 475 housing units at an average density of 12.61 per square mile (4.87/km^{2}). The racial makeup of the township was 93.47% White, 0.20% African American, 0.40% Native American, 0.20% Asian, 0.10% Pacific Islander, 0.69% from other races, and 4.95% from two or more races. Hispanic or Latino of any race were 5.05% of the population.

There were 430 households, out of which 26.70% had children under the age of 18 living with them, 60.47% were married couples living together, 4.65% had a female householder with no spouse present, and 33.26% were non-families. 26.70% of all households were made up of individuals, and 13.50% had someone living alone who was 65 years of age or older. The average household size was 2.49 and the average family size was 3.09.

The township's age distribution consisted of 21.5% under the age of 18, 10.3% from 18 to 24, 18.7% from 25 to 44, 28% from 45 to 64, and 21.5% who were 65 years of age or older. The median age was 44.6 years. For every 100 females, there were 100.0 males. For every 100 females age 18 and over, there were 115.3 males.

The median income for a household in the township was $71,875, and the median income for a family was $80,885. Males had a median income of $39,000 versus $27,450 for females. The per capita income for the township was $35,262. About 1.0% of families and 3.1% of the population were below the poverty line, including 3.9% of those under age 18 and 6.1% of those age 65 or over.

Historical population
Census	Pop.	Note	%±
2010	1,122		—
2020	1,010		−10.0%
US Decennial Census

== School districts ==
- La Moille Community Unit School District 303

== Political districts ==
- Illinois's 16th congressional district
- State House District 76
- State Senate District 38
