= Milo Township =

Milo Township can refer to any of a number of places in the United States.

- Milo Township, Bureau County, Illinois
- Milo Township, Delaware County, Iowa
- Milo Township, Mille Lacs County, Minnesota
- Milo, New York, a town in Yates County, New York
