= Clarion Township =

Clarion Township may refer to the following townships in the United States:

- Clarion Township, Bureau County, Illinois
- Clarion Township, Clarion County, Pennsylvania
