= Henry J. Knauf =

American politician and businessman

Henry Joseph Knauf known as "Heinie" (February 15, 1891 – April 16, 1950) was an American politician and businessman.

Born in Hall Township, Bureau County, Illinois, Knauf lived in Ladd, Illinois and worked in the hardware and implement business. He served in the Illinois House of Representatives from 1935 until his death in 1950 and was a Democrat. Knauf was also the owner of Siskiyou Farm that raised horses and was President of the United States Trotting Association. Knauf was in Des Moines, Iowa to speak at the Trotting Horse Association of Iowa when he died of a heart attack at his hotel in Des Moines, Iowa.
