= Selby Township, Bureau County, Illinois =

Selby Township
- Township
- Location in Bureau County

- Bureau County's location in Illinois
- Coordinates: 41°21′45″N 89°19′53″W
- Country: United States
- State: Illinois
- County: Bureau
- Established: November 6, 1849

Area
  - Total: 36.15 sq mi (93.6 km^{2})
  - Land: 35.94 sq mi (93.1 km^{2})
  - Water: 0.21 sq mi (0.54 km^{2}) 0.58%
- Elevation: 659 ft (201 m)

Population (2020)
  - Total: 2,152
  - Density: 59.88/sq mi (23.12/km^{2})
- Time zone: UTC-6 (CST)
  - Summer (DST): UTC-5 (CDT)
- ZIP codes: 61322, 61356, 61359, 61362
- FIPS code: 17-011-68562

Selby Township is one of twenty-five townships in Bureau County, Illinois, USA. As of the 2020 census, its population was 2,152 and it contained 929 housing units.

== Geography ==
According to the 2010 census, the township has a total area of 36.15 square miles (93.6 km^{2}), of which 35.94 square miles (93.1 km^{2}) (or 99.42%) is land and 0.21 square miles (0.54 km^{2}) (or 0.58%) is water.

=== Villages ===
- DePue (northwest three-quarters)
- Hollowayville
- Seatonville (west quarter)

=== Unincorporated towns ===
- Coal Hollow

=== Cemeteries ===
The township contains six cemeteries:

- Artestian Well
- DePue Village
- Evangelical and Reformed
- Hollowayville
- Saint Johns Lutheran
- Searl Ridge

=== Major highways ===
- Interstate 80
- I-180
- U.S. Route 6
- Illinois Route 29

=== Airports and landing strips ===
- Foley Airport

=== Landmarks ===
- Lake Park
- White City Park

== Demographics ==
As of the 2020 census there were 2,152 people, 808 households, and 640 families residing in the township. The population density was 59.57 inhabitants per square mile (23.00/km^{2}). There were 929 housing units at an average density of 25.72 per square mile (9.93/km^{2}). The racial makeup of the township was 55.95% White, 1.35% African American, 2.09% Native American, 2.60% Asian, 0.05% Pacific Islander, 18.31% from other races, and 19.66% from two or more races. Hispanic or Latino of any race were 47.58% of the population.

There were 808 households, out of which 36.50% had children under the age of 18 living with them, 59.90% were married couples living together, 10.40% had a female householder with no spouse present, and 20.79% were non-families. 16.70% of all households were made up of individuals, and 9.40% had someone living alone who was 65 years of age or older. The average household size was 2.89 and the average family size was 3.13.

The township's age distribution consisted of 26.9% under the age of 18, 7.2% from 18 to 24, 23.1% from 25 to 44, 25.6% from 45 to 64, and 17.2% who were 65 years of age or older. The median age was 39.4 years. For every 100 females, there were 121.5 males. For every 100 females age 18 and over, there were 130.5 males.

The median income for a household in the township was $62,500, and the median income for a family was $68,056. Males had a median income of $34,697 versus $25,286 for females. The per capita income for the township was $26,589. About 6.9% of families and 11.5% of the population were below the poverty line, including 20.5% of those under age 18 and 4.5% of those age 65 or over.

Historical population
Census	Pop.	Note	%±
2010	2,536		—
2020	2,152		−15.1%
US Decennial Census

== School districts ==
- Depue Community Unit School District 103

== Political districts ==
- Illinois's 11th congressional district
- State House District 76
- State Senate District 38
