= Macon Township, Bureau County, Illinois =

Macon Township
- Township
- Location in Bureau County

- Bureau County's location in Illinois
- Coordinates: 41°16′19″N 89°41′19″W
- Country: United States
- State: Illinois
- County: Bureau
- Established: November 6, 1849

Area
  - Total: 36.61 sq mi (94.8 km^{2})
  - Land: 36.61 sq mi (94.8 km^{2})
  - Water: 0 sq mi (0 km^{2}) 0%
- Elevation: 764 ft (233 m)

Population (2020)
  - Total: 196
  - Density: 5.35/sq mi (2.07/km^{2})
- Time zone: UTC-6 (CST)
  - Summer (DST): UTC-5 (CDT)
- ZIP codes: 61314, 61345, 61368
- FIPS code: 17-011-45928

Macon Township is one of twenty-five townships in Bureau County, Illinois, USA. As of the 2020 census, its population was 196 and it contained 93 housing units. Macon Township changed its name from Jefferson Township in June 1850.

== Geography ==
According to the 2010 census, the township has a total area of 36.61 square miles (94.8 km^{2}), all land.

=== Unincorporated towns ===
- Burnett

=== Cemeteries ===
The township contains four cemeteries:

- Bunker Hills
- Mount Pleasant
- Walnut Grove
- Wood Family Cemetery

=== Major highways ===
- Illinois Route 40

== Demographics ==
As of the 2020 census there were 196 people, 72 households, and 43 families residing in the township. The population density was 5.36 inhabitants per square mile (2.07/km^{2}). There were 93 housing units at an average density of 2.54 per square mile (0.98/km^{2}). The racial makeup of the township was 95.41% White, 1.02% African American, 0.00% Native American, 0.00% Asian, 0.00% Pacific Islander, 3.06% from other races, and 0.51% from two or more races. Hispanic or Latino of any race were 2.55% of the population.

There were 72 households, out of which 12.50% had children under the age of 18 living with them, 59.72% were married couples living together, none had a female householder with no spouse present, and 40.28% were non-families. 40.30% of all households were made up of individuals, and 4.20% had someone living alone who was 65 years of age or older. The average household size was 1.86 and the average family size was 2.44.

The township's age distribution consisted of 14.2% under the age of 18, none from 18 to 24, 13.4% from 25 to 44, 70.2% from 45 to 64, and 2.2% who were 65 years of age or older. The median age was 55.5 years. For every 100 females, there were 148.1 males. For every 100 females age 18 and over, there were 155.6 males.

The median income for a household in the township was $115,125, and the median income for a family was $115,688. Males had a median income of $79,286 versus $24,375 for females. The per capita income for the township was $49,806. None of the population was below the poverty line.

Historical population
Census	Pop.	Note	%±
2010	208		—
2020	196		−5.8%
US Decennial Census

== School districts ==
- Bradford Community Unit School District 1
- Bureau Valley Community Unit School District 340
- Neponset Community Consolidated District 307

== Political districts ==
- Illinois's 11th congressional district
- State House District 74
- State Senate District 37
