= Clarion Township, Bureau County, Illinois =

Clarion Township
- Township
- Location in Bureau County

- Bureau County's location in Illinois
- Coordinates: 41°32′16″N 89°13′31″W
- Country: United States
- State: Illinois
- County: Bureau
- Established: November 6, 1849

Area
  - Total: 35.35 sq mi (91.6 km^{2})
  - Land: 35.35 sq mi (91.6 km^{2})
  - Water: 0 sq mi (0 km^{2}) 0%
- Elevation: 833 ft (254 m)

Population (2020)
  - Total: 410
  - Density: 12/sq mi (4.5/km^{2})
- Time zone: UTC-6 (CST)
  - Summer (DST): UTC-5 (CDT)
- ZIP codes: 61330, 61342
- FIPS code: 17-011-14598

Clarion Township is one of twenty-five townships in Bureau County, Illinois, United States. As of the 2020 census, its population was 410 and it contained 177 housing units.

== Geography ==
According to the 2010 census, the township has a total area of 35.35 square miles (91.6 km^{2}), all land.

=== Cities ===
- La Moille (east quarter)

=== Stations ===
- Clarion
- Wendell

Both locations were railroad stations with no residential buildings immediately adjacent. Clarion was a station on what is now the Burlington Northern mainline a few miles southwest of Mendota. No siding or any visible sign of a station exists—and has not since at least 1950. Wendel station was on a Burlington Northern branch line about four miles west of Mendota. A grain elevator (at one time operated by the Wendel family) was the only structure other than nearby farmsteads. The branch railroad was abandoned and all rails removed circa 1975.

=== Cemeteries ===
The township contains these five cemeteries: Clarion Lutheran, Erbes, German Evangelical, Hetzler and Hill.

=== Major highways ===
- US Route 34
- Illinois Route 89

=== Airports and landing strips ===
- Ivan E Bauer Heliport
- Keutzer Airport
- Otterbach Farm Airport

== Demographics ==
As of the 2020 census there were 410 people, 98 households, and 68 families residing in the township. The population density was 11.60 inhabitants per square mile (4.48/km^{2}). There were 177 housing units at an average density of 5.01 units per square mile (1.93 units/km^{2}). The racial makeup of the township was 91.71% White, 0.49% African American, 0.49% Native American, 0.49% Asian, 0.00% Pacific Islander, 3.41% from other races, and 3.41% from two or more races. Hispanic or Latino of any race were 4.88% of the population.

There were 98 households, out of which 30.60% had children under the age of 18 living with them, 66.33% were married couples living together, 3.06% had a female householder with no spouse present, and 30.61% were non-families. 18.40% of all households were made up of individuals, and 7.10% had someone living alone who was 65 years of age or older. The average household size was 2.44 and the average family size was 2.82.

The township's age distribution consisted of 17.6% under the age of 18, 2.1% from 18 to 24, 14.3% from 25 to 44, 51.4% from 45 to 64, and 14.6% who were 65 years of age or older. The median age was 50.7 years. For every 100 females, there were 81.1 males. For every 100 females age 18 and over, there were 82.4 males.

The median income for a household in the township was $102,500, and the median income for a family was $109,107. Males had a median income of $46,875 versus $43,125 for females. The per capita income for the township was $43,908. About 4.4% of families and 6.3% of the population were below the poverty line, including 16.7% of those under age 18 and none of those age 65 or over.

Historical population
Census	Pop.	Note	%±
2010	421		—
2020	410		−2.6%
U.S. Decennial Census

== School districts ==
- La Moille Community Unit School District 303
- Mendota Elementary District 289
- Mendota High School District 280

== Political districts ==
- Illinois' 11th congressional district
- State House District 76
- State House District 90
- State Senate District 38
- State Senate District 45
