= Ottville, Illinois =

- Unincorporated community
- Location within Illinois Location within the United States
- Coordinates: 41°20′53″N 89°15′31″W
- Country: United States
- State: Illinois
- County: Bureau
- Elevation: 653 ft (199 m)
- Time zone: UTC-6 (Central (CST))
  - Summer (DST): UTC-5 (CDT)
- Area codes: 815 & 779
- GNIS feature ID: 415240

Ottville is an unincorporated community in Bureau County, Illinois, United States. Ottville is northwest of Spring Valley and southeast of Seatonville.

It was founded by William Ott (1805–1871), who also served as the community's postmaster. At one time, Ottville was a prospering village with a blacksmith shop, post office, church, sorghum mill, ice house, and public school. The lack of a railroad precipitated Ottville's decline as other nearby communities grew. The Ottville School graduated its last student in May 1955.
