= Bradford Community Unit School District 1 =

School district in Illinois, United States

Bradford Community Unit School District 1 is a school district headquartered in Bradford, Illinois.

The district is mostly in Stark County. The district extends into Bureau County and Marshall County.

== History ==
Then-superintendent Russell Huey had a planned retirement date of July 1, 1975. Charles A. Lane, who was the principal of the high school, was scheduled to replace him.

In 1989 the district leadership agreed that the district should become a part of Illinois Central College.

Bradford High School closed on July 1, 2001, and was scheduled to become the Jr. High. As of 2001 the high school students have their choice of attending one of three high schools: Stark County High School, Henry-Senachwine High School, or Bureau Valley High School.
