= Fairfield Township, Bureau County, Illinois =

Fairfield Township
- Township
- Location in Bureau County

- Bureau County's location in Illinois
- Coordinates: 41°32′26″N 89°48′46″W
- Country: United States
- State: Illinois
- County: Bureau
- Established: November 6, 1849

Area
  - Total: 36.39 sq mi (94.2 km^{2})
  - Land: 36.39 sq mi (94.2 km^{2})
  - Water: 0 sq mi (0 km^{2}) 0%
- Elevation: 627 ft (191 m)

Population (2020)
  - Total: 379
  - Density: 10.4/sq mi (4.02/km^{2})
- Time zone: UTC-6 (CST)
  - Summer (DST): UTC-5 (CDT)
- ZIP codes: 61283, 61344, 61361
- FIPS code: 17-011-24790

Fairfield Township is one of twenty-five townships in Bureau County, Illinois, USA. As of the 2020 census, its population was 379 and it contained 142 housing units.

== Geography ==
According to the 2010 census, the township has a total area of 36.39 square miles (94.2 km^{2}), all land.

=== Unincorporated towns ===
- Thomas
- Yorktown: an unincorporated community located (41°34′11″N 89°51′00″W) on Illinois Route 92, southwest of Tampico.

=== Cemeteries ===
The township contains three cemeteries:

- Amish
- Anderson Family
- Yorktown

=== Major highways ===
- Illinois Route 92

=== Airports and landing strips ===
- Lisa Landing Strip

=== Landmarks ===
- Hennepin Canal Parkway State Park (north quarter)

== Demographics ==
As of the 2020 census there were 379 people, 114 households, and 106 families residing in the township. The population density was 10.41 inhabitants per square mile (4.02/km^{2}). There were 142 housing units at an average density of 3.90 per square mile (1.51/km^{2}). The racial makeup of the township was 95.51% White, 0.53% African American, 0.00% Native American, 0.53% Asian, 0.79% Pacific Islander, 0.26% from other races, and 2.37% from two or more races. Hispanic or Latino of any race were 1.06% of the population.

There were 114 households, out of which 45.60% had children under the age of 18 living with them, 82.46% were married couples living together, 10.53% had a female householder with no spouse present, and 7.02% were non-families. 7.00% of all households were made up of individuals, and 7.00% had someone living alone who was 65 years of age or older. The average household size was 4.96 and the average family size was 5.26.

The township's age distribution consisted of 38.5% under the age of 18, 7.2% from 18 to 24, 32.1% from 25 to 44, 15.1% from 45 to 64, and 6.9% who were 65 years of age or older. The median age was 29.2 years. For every 100 females, there were 121.1 males. For every 100 females age 18 and over, there were 66.5 males.

The median income for a household in the township was $78,542, and the median income for a family was $79,375. Males had a median income of $34,531 versus $27,083 for females. The per capita income for the township was $18,520. About 22.6% of families and 33.6% of the population were below the poverty line, including 65.1% of those under age 18 and none of those age 65 or over.

Historical population
Census	Pop.	Note	%±
2010	375		—
2020	379		1.1%
US Decennial Census

== School districts ==
- Bureau Valley Community Unit School District 340
- Prophetstown-Lyndon-Tampico Community Unit School District 3

== Political districts ==
- Illinois's 14th congressional district
- State House District 74
- State Senate District 37
