= Dalzell, Illinois =

- Village
- Location of Dalzell in Bureau County, Illinois.
- Coordinates: 41°21′21″N 89°10′35″W
- Country: USA
- State: Illinois
- Counties: Bureau, LaSalle
- Townships: Hall, Peru
- Founded: 1903
- Named for: Samuel M. Dalzell

Area
  - Total: 0.83 sq mi (2.1 km^{2})
  - Land: 0.82 sq mi (2.1 km^{2})
  - Water: 0.01 sq mi (0.026 km^{2})
- Elevation: 607 ft (185 m)

Population (2020)
  - Total: 663
  - Density: 808.54/sq mi (312.18/km^{2})
- Time zone: UTC-6 (CST)
  - Summer (DST): UTC-5 (CDT)
- ZIP Code(s): 61320
- Area codes: 815 & 779
- FIPS code: 17-18459
- GNIS feature ID: 2398674

Dalzell is a village in Bureau and LaSalle counties in the U.S. state of Illinois. The population was 663 at the 2020 census, down from 717 at the 2010 census. It is part of the Ottawa Micropolitan Statistical Area. Dalzell was founded on November 24, 1903, and certified on February 11, 1904.

== History ==
The coal mine shaft in Dalzell was sunk in 1899 by the Spring Valley Coal Company. The town was originally known as the No. 5 Mine Camp. The company owned the property in and around the town. Later the No. 6 Mine Camp was added. The camps were incorporated on February 11, 1904. The village was named for mining magnate Samuel M. Dalzell, the mine manager from Spring Valley. The mine closed in February 1923.

A post office called Dalzell has been in operation since 1902.

== Geography ==
Most of the village lies in Bureau County, although a small portion extends into west central LaSalle County. In the 2000 census, all of Dalzell's 717 residents lived in Bureau County.

According to the 2021 census gazetteer files, Dalzell has a total area of 0.83 square miles (2.15 km^{2}), of which 0.82 square miles (2.12 km^{2}) (or 99.15%) is land and 0.01 square miles (0.03 km^{2}) (or 0.85%) is water.

== Demographics ==
Historical population
| Census | Pop. | Note | %± |
|---|---|---|---|
| 1910 | 949 | | — |
| 1920 | 903 | | −4.8% |
| 1930 | 577 | | −36.1% |
| 1940 | 496 | | −14.0% |
| 1950 | 543 | | 9.5% |
| 1960 | 496 | | −8.7% |
| 1970 | 579 | | 16.7% |
| 1980 | 824 | | 42.3% |
| 1990 | 587 | | −28.8% |
| 2000 | 717 | | 22.1% |
| 2010 | 717 | | 0.0% |
| 2020 | 663 | | −7.5% |
U.S. Decennial Census

As of the 2020 census there were 663 people, 265 households, and 195 families residing in the village. The population density was 801.69 inhabitants per square mile (309.53/km^{2}). There were 312 housing units at an average density of 377.27 per square mile (145.66/km^{2}). The racial makeup of the village was 92.76% White, 0.30% African American, 0.15% Native American, 1.66% Asian, 0.90% from other races, and 4.22% from two or more races. Hispanic or Latino of any race were 4.68% of the population.

There were 265 households, out of which 24.2% had children under the age of 18 living with them, 62.26% were married couples living together, 7.92% had a female householder with no husband present, and 26.42% were non-families. 21.89% of all households were made up of individuals, and 10.57% had someone living alone who was 65 years of age or older. The average household size was 2.71 and the average family size was 2.37.

The village's age distribution consisted of 14.3% under the age of 18, 9.7% from 18 to 24, 23.4% from 25 to 44, 30.7% from 45 to 64, and 21.8% who were 65 years of age or older. The median age was 46.8 years. For every 100 females, there were 108.6 males. For every 100 females age 18 and over, there were 111.8 males.

The median income for a household in the village was $63,750, and the median income for a family was $79,034. Males had a median income of $33,125 versus $27,750 for females. The per capita income for the village was $31,279. About 4.1% of families and 4.8% of the population were below the poverty line, including 7.0% of those under age 18 and 2.9% of those age 65 or over.

== Transportation ==
While there is no fixed-route transit service in Dalzell, intercity bus service is provided by Burlington Trailways in nearby Peru.
