= Van Orin, Illinois =

- Unincorporated community
- Location within Illinois Location within the United States
- Coordinates: 41°33′00″N 89°21′12″W
- Country: United States
- State: Illinois
- County: Bureau
- Elevation: 801 ft (244 m)
- Time zone: UTC-6 (Central (CST))
  - Summer (DST): UTC-5 (CDT)
- Area codes: 815 & 779
- GNIS feature ID: 420219

Van Orin is an unincorporated community in Bureau County, Illinois, United States. Van Orin is located along Illinois Route 92, east of Ohio and northwest of La Moille.

The community is named after Van Orin Cresap, a predominant citizen and local farmer. A post office was established in 1872.

Van Orin Elementary School is located in the community. The school serves the La Moille Community Unit School District No. 303.

Chartered in 1919, the First State Bank of Van Orin is also located in the community.
