= Wyanet Township, Bureau County, Illinois =

Wyanet Township
- Township
- Location in Bureau County

- Bureau County's location in Illinois
- Coordinates: 41°22′01″N 89°34′13″W
- Country: United States
- State: Illinois
- County: Bureau
- Established: November 6, 1849

Area
  - Total: 36.14 sq mi (93.6 km^{2})
  - Land: 36.09 sq mi (93.5 km^{2})
  - Water: 0.04 sq mi (0.10 km^{2}) 0.11%
- Elevation: 587 ft (179 m)

Population (2020)
  - Total: 1,245
  - Density: 34.50/sq mi (13.32/km^{2})
- Time zone: UTC-6 (CST)
  - Summer (DST): UTC-5 (CDT)
- ZIP codes: 61356, 61379
- FIPS code: 17-011-83635

Wyanet Township is one of twenty-five townships in Bureau County, Illinois, USA. As of the 2020 census, its population was 1,245 and it contained 567 housing units. Wyanet Township changed its name from Centre Township on an unknown date.

== Geography ==
According to the 2021 census gazetteer files, Wyanet Township has a total area of 36.24 square miles (93.86 km^{2}), of which 36.20 square miles (93.76 km^{2}) (or 99.88%) is land and 0.04 square miles (0.10 km^{2}) (or 0.12%) is water.

=== Villages ===
- Wyanet

=== Cemeteries ===
- Aldrich Family
- County Home
- Forest Hill
- Sapp
- Triplett

=== Major highways ===
- Interstate 80
- US Route 6

=== Airports and landing strips ===
- Eckberg Airport

== Demographics ==
As of the 2020 census there were 1,245 people, 549 households, and 374 families residing in the township. The population density was 34.35 inhabitants per square mile (13.26/km^{2}). There were 567 housing units at an average density of 15.65 per square mile (6.04/km^{2}). The racial makeup of the township was 92.85% White, 0.32% African American, 0.56% Native American, 0.48% Asian, 0.00% Pacific Islander, 0.24% from other races, and 5.54% from two or more races. Hispanic or Latino of any race were 3.45% of the population.

There were 549 households, out of which 39.00% had children under the age of 18 living with them, 54.10% were married couples living together, 10.93% had a female householder with no spouse present, and 31.88% were non-families. 25.10% of all households were made up of individuals, and 14.90% had someone living alone who was 65 years of age or older. The average household size was 2.59 and the average family size was 3.04.

The township's age distribution consisted of 28.9% under the age of 18, 5.9% from 18 to 24, 27.1% from 25 to 44, 23.1% from 45 to 64, and 14.9% who were 65 years of age or older. The median age was 39.1 years. For every 100 females, there were 94.8 males. For every 100 females age 18 and over, there were 91.1 males.

The median income for a household in the township was $48,036, and the median income for a family was $58,571. Males had a median income of $43,313 versus $25,438 for females. The per capita income for the township was $23,870. About 13.6% of families and 17.6% of the population were below the poverty line, including 26.7% of those under age 18 and 5.7% of those age 65 or over.

Historical population
Census	Pop.	Note	%±
2010	1,364		—
2020	1,245		−8.7%
US Decennial Census

== School districts ==
- Bureau Valley Community Unit School District 340

== Political districts ==
- Illinois's 11th congressional district
- State House District 73
- State House District 74
- State Senate District 37
