= Hollowayville, Illinois =

- Village
- Location of Hollowayville in Bureau County, Illinois.
- Coordinates: 41°21′53″N 89°17′42″W
- Country: United States
- State: Illinois
- County: Bureau
- Township: Selby

Area
  - Total: 0.050 sq mi (0.13 km^{2})
  - Land: 0.050 sq mi (0.13 km^{2})
  - Water: 0 sq mi (0.00 km^{2})
- Elevation: 659 ft (201 m)

Population (2020)
  - Total: 36
  - Density: 740/sq mi (284/km^{2})
- Time zone: UTC-6 (CST)
  - Summer (DST): UTC-5 (CDT)
- ZIP code: 61356
- Area codes: 815 & 779
- FIPS code: 17-35671
- GNIS feature ID: 2398528

Hollowayville is a village in Bureau County, Illinois, United States. The population was 36 at the 2020 census. It is part of the Ottawa Micropolitan Statistical Area.

== History ==
Just west of Hollowayville is St. John's Evangelical Lutheran Church that was established in 1849 by German immigrants.

Hollowayville is one of the oldest villages in Bureau County. It was the former site of a coal mine Hollowayville boasts one of the state's lowest sales tax rates.

== Geography ==
According to the 2021 census gazetteer files, Hollowayville has a total area of 0.05 square miles (0.13 km^{2}), all land.

== Demographics ==
Historical population
Census	Pop.	Note	%±
1880	111		—
1900	207		—
1910	196		−5.3%
1920	107		−45.4%
1930	104		−2.8%
1940	112		7.7%
1950	89		−20.5%
1960	96		7.9%
1970	94		−2.1%
1980	92		−2.1%
1990	37		−59.8%
2000	90		143.2%
2010	84		−6.7%
2020	36		−57.1%
U.S. Decennial Census

As of the 2020 census there were 36 people, 24 households, and 24 families residing in the village. The population density was 734.69 inhabitants per square mile (283.67/km^{2}). There were 19 housing units at an average density of 387.76 per square mile (149.71/km^{2}). The racial makeup of the village was 83.33% White, 2.78% Native American, 2.78% Asian, 5.56% from other races, and 5.56% from two or more races. No residents identified as Hispanic or Latino.

There were 24 households, out of which 54.2% had children under the age of 18 living with them, 54.17% were married couples living together, 45.83% had a female householder with no husband present, and none were non-families. No households were made up of individuals. The average household size was 2.38 and the average family size was 2.38.

The village's age distribution consisted of 15.8% under the age of 18, 12.3% from 18 to 24, 14.1% from 25 to 44, 31.6% from 45 to 64, and 26.3% who were 65 years of age or older. The median age was 45.8 years. For every 100 females, there were 83.9 males. For every 100 females age 18 and over, there were 84.6 males.

Males had a median income of $18,438 versus $27,344 for females. The per capita income for the village was $23,505. None of the population was below the poverty line.
