= Princeton Township, Bureau County, Illinois =

Township in Bureau County, Illinois

Princeton Township
- Township
- Location in Bureau County

- Bureau County's location in Illinois
- Coordinates: 41°21′52″N 89°26′59″W
- Country: United States
- State: Illinois
- County: Bureau
- Established: November 6, 1849

Area
  - Total: 36.62 sq mi (94.8 km^{2})
  - Land: 36.59 sq mi (94.8 km^{2})
  - Water: 0.03 sq mi (0.078 km^{2}) 0.08%
- Elevation: 696 ft (212 m)

Population (2020)
  - Total: 9,223
  - Density: 252.1/sq mi (97.32/km^{2})
- Time zone: UTC-6 (CST)
  - Summer (DST): UTC-5 (CDT)
- ZIP codes: 61356, 61368
- FIPS code: 17-011-61912

Princeton Township is one of twenty-five townships in Bureau County, Illinois, USA. As of the 2020 census, its population was 9,223 and it contained 4,465 housing units.

== Geography ==
According to the 2010 census, the township has a total area of 36.62 square miles (94.8 km^{2}), of which 36.59 square miles (94.8 km^{2}) (or 99.92%) is land and 0.03 square miles (0.078 km^{2}) (or 0.08%) is water.

=== Cities ===
- Princeton (partial)

=== Cemeteries ===
The township contains four cemeteries:

- Elm Lawn
- Jenkins-Green
- Oakland
- Woodlawn-Stoner

=== Major highways ===
- Interstate 80
- US Route 6
- US Route 34
- Illinois Route 26

=== Airports and landing strips ===
- Perry Memorial Hospital Heliport

=== Landmarks ===
- Princeton Park

== Demographics ==
As of the 2020 census there were 9,223 people, 4,004 households, and 2,483 families residing in the township. The population density was 252.19 inhabitants per square mile (97.37/km^{2}). There were 4,465 housing units at an average density of 122.09 per square mile (47.14/km^{2}). The racial makeup of the township was 92.16% White, 0.96% African American, 0.33% Native American, 1.30% Asian, 0.14% Pacific Islander, 1.04% from other races, and 4.07% from two or more races. Hispanic or Latino of any race were 4.25% of the population.

There were 4,004 households, out of which 26.30% had children under the age of 18 living with them, 47.40% were married couples living together, 11.61% had a female householder with no spouse present, and 37.99% were non-families. 32.80% of all households were made up of individuals, and 18.60% had someone living alone who was 65 years of age or older. The average household size was 2.16 and the average family size was 2.69.

The township's age distribution consisted of 19.3% under the age of 18, 6.6% from 18 to 24, 19.6% from 25 to 44, 25.4% from 45 to 64, and 29.1% who were 65 years of age or older. The median age was 48.6 years. For every 100 females, there were 79.8 males. For every 100 females age 18 and over, there were 79.8 males.

The median income for a household in the township was $52,990, and the median income for a family was $69,510. Males had a median income of $46,371 versus $23,102 for females. The per capita income for the township was $32,761. About 7.9% of families and 12.9% of the population were below the poverty line, including 23.3% of those under age 18 and 6.8% of those age 65 or over.

Historical population
Census	Pop.	Note	%±
2010	9,331		—
2020	9,223		−1.2%
US Decennial Census

== School districts ==
- Bureau Valley Community Unit School District 340
- Princeton Elementary School District 115
- Princeton High School District 500

== Political districts ==
- Illinois's 11th congressional district
- State House District 74
- State Senate District 37
