= Normandy, Illinois =

- Unincorporated community
- Location within Illinois Location within the United States
- Coordinates: 41°33′43″N 89°38′57″W
- Country: United States
- State: Illinois
- County: Bureau
- Elevation: 653 ft (199 m)
- Time zone: UTC-6 (Central (CST))
  - Summer (DST): UTC-5 (CDT)
- Area codes: 815 & 779
- GNIS feature ID: 414550

Normandy is an unincorporated community in Bureau County, Illinois, United States, located on Illinois Route 92, west of Walnut.

== History ==
A post office called Normandy was established in 1902, and remained in operation until it was discontinued in 1978. The community was named for the Norman family, the original owners of the town site.
