= Milo Township, Bureau County, Illinois =

Milo Township
- Township
- Location in Bureau County

- Bureau County's location in Illinois
- Coordinates: 41°10′59″N 89°35′04″W
- Country: United States
- State: Illinois
- County: Bureau
- Established: November 6, 1849

Area
  - Total: 34.99 sq mi (90.6 km^{2})
  - Land: 34.98 sq mi (90.6 km^{2})
  - Water: 0.01 sq mi (0.026 km^{2}) 0.03%
- Elevation: 846 ft (258 m)

Population (2020)
  - Total: 191
  - Density: 5.46/sq mi (2.11/km^{2})
- Time zone: UTC-6 (CST)
  - Summer (DST): UTC-5 (CDT)
- ZIP codes: 61314, 61368, 61421
- FIPS code: 17-011-49438

Milo Township is one of twenty-five townships in Bureau County, Illinois, USA. As of the 2020 census, its population was 191 and it contained 79 housing units.

The township was named after Milo, New York.

== Geography ==
According to the 2010 census, the township has a total area of 34.99 square miles (90.6 km^{2}), of which 34.98 square miles (90.6 km^{2}) (or 99.97%) is land and 0.01 square miles (0.026 km^{2}) (or 0.03%) is water.

=== Unincorporated towns ===
- Milo

=== Cemeteries ===
The township contains two cemeteries:

- Boyds Grove
- Milo

=== Airports and landing strips ===
- Rinkenberger RLA Airport

== Demographics ==
As of the 2020 census there were 191 people, 89 households, and 76 families residing in the township. The population density was 5.46 inhabitants per square mile (2.11/km^{2}). There were 79 housing units at an average density of 2.26 per square mile (0.87/km^{2}). The racial makeup of the township was 97.91% White, 0.00% African American, 0.00% Native American, 0.00% Asian, 0.00% Pacific Islander, 0.52% from other races, and 1.57% from two or more races. Hispanic or Latino of any race were 0.52% of the population.

There were 89 households, out of which 32.60% had children under the age of 18 living with them, 77.53% were married couples living together, 3.37% had a female householder with no spouse present, and 14.61% were non-families. 11.20% of all households were made up of individuals, and 0.00% had someone living alone who was 65 years of age or older. The average household size was 2.78 and the average family size was 2.99.

The township's age distribution consisted of 27.5% under the age of 18, 4.5% from 18 to 24, 12.1% from 25 to 44, 32.8% from 45 to 64, and 23.1% who were 65 years of age or older. The median age was 47.1 years. For every 100 females, there were 102.5 males. For every 100 females age 18 and over, there were 123.8 males.

The median income for a household in the township was $72,292, and the median income for a family was $78,750. Males had a median income of $44,688 versus $21,875 for females. The per capita income for the township was $31,115. About 5.3% of families and 10.1% of the population were below the poverty line, including 23.5% of those under age 18 and none of those age 65 or over.

Historical population
Census	Pop.	Note	%±
2010	207		—
2020	191		−7.7%
US Decennial Census

== School districts ==
- Bradford Community Unit School District 1

== Political districts ==
- Illinois's 18th congressional district
- State House District 73
- State Senate District 37
