= Whitefield, Illinois =

- Unincorporated community
- Location within Illinois Location within the United States
- Coordinates: 41°08′55″N 89°30′17″W
- Country: United States
- State: Illinois
- Counties: Bureau and Marshall
- Elevation: 709 ft (216 m)
- Time zone: UTC-6 (Central (CST))
  - Summer (DST): UTC-5 (CDT)
- Area codes: 815 & 779
- GNIS feature ID: 421088

Whitefield is an unincorporated community in Bureau and Marshall counties, Illinois, United States. It is located approximately nine miles west-northwest of Henry and the Illinois River. Crow Creek flows past to the north of the community.
