= Ladd, Illinois =

- Village
- Location of Ladd in Bureau County, Illinois.
- Coordinates: 41°22′35″N 89°12′58″W
- Country: United States
- State: Illinois
- County: Bureau
- Township: Hall

Area
  - Total: 1.21 sq mi (3.13 km^{2})
  - Land: 1.21 sq mi (3.13 km^{2})
  - Water: 0 sq mi (0.00 km^{2})
- Elevation: 650 ft (200 m)

Population (2020)
  - Total: 1,263
  - Density: 1,050/sq mi (404/km^{2})
- Time zone: UTC-6 (CST)
  - Summer (DST): UTC-5 (CDT)
- ZIP code: 61329
- Area code: 815
- FIPS code: 17-40598
- GNIS feature ID: 2398372
- Website: www.villageofladd.com

Ladd is a village in Bureau County, Illinois, United States. The population was 1,236 at the 2020 census. It is part of the Ottawa Micropolitan Statistical Area. Ladd is perhaps most known for a Vietnam War tank located in the center of its park.

== History ==
The settlement was originally named Osgood after the manager of the Whitebreast Fuel Company. The Whitebreast Fuel Company, based in Ottumwa, Iowa was the major coal supplier for the Chicago, Burlington, and Quincy Railroad. They set up the town in 1888. Ladd was incorporated on June 7, 1890, and was founded by George D. Ladd, a resident of Peru, Illinois. Ladd was originally named Laddville. The Ladd mine went bankrupt in 1901 and was purchased by the Illinois Third Vein Coal Company, owned by Samuel Dalzell of Spring Valley. At its height, the mine employed over 700 men and took an average of 1200 tons of coal a day from the ground. As a coal mining town, it is ethnically diverse with immigrants from Italy, Ireland, and Poland taking jobs at the mine. The mine closed in 1924.

In 2015 the village celebrated its 125th anniversary. The local grade school was replaced in the summer of 2003; prior to that the grade school occupied the building that originally housed Hall High School until the new school was constructed in 1911 in Spring Valley, at which time the old high school became the new Ladd C.C. School which had previously been a little three-room building behind the high school.

== Geography ==
Ladd is located one mile north of Interstate 80 on Illinois Route 89. It is located between the village of Cherry to the north and the city of Spring Valley to the south.

According to the 2021 census gazetteer files, Ladd has a total area of 1.21 square miles (3.13 km^{2}), all land.

== Demographics ==
Historical population
Census	Pop.	Note	%±
1900	1,324		—
1910	1,910		44.3%
1920	2,040		6.8%
1930	1,318		−35.4%
1940	1,156		−12.3%
1950	1,224		5.9%
1960	1,255		2.5%
1970	1,328		5.8%
1980	1,337		0.7%
1990	1,283		−4.0%
2000	1,313		2.3%
2010	1,295		−1.4%
2020	1,263		−2.5%
U.S. Decennial Census

=== 2020 census ===
As of the 2020 census, Ladd had a population of 1,263 and 306 families residing in the village. The median age was 41.9 years. 21.0% of residents were under the age of 18 and 17.9% were 65 years of age or older. For every 100 females there were 105.7 males, and for every 100 females age 18 and over there were 101.2 males age 18 and over.

83.8% of residents lived in urban areas, while 16.2% lived in rural areas.

There were 557 households, of which 28.5% had children under the age of 18 living in them. Of all households, 47.0% were married-couple households, 21.4% were households with a male householder and no spouse or partner present, and 22.8% were households with a female householder and no spouse or partner present. About 31.8% of all households were made up of individuals and 13.1% had someone living alone who was 65 years of age or older.

There were 585 housing units, of which 4.8% were vacant. The homeowner vacancy rate was 1.4% and the rental vacancy rate was 3.5%. The population density was 1,044.67 inhabitants per square mile (403.35/km^{2}), and housing unit density was 483.87 per square mile (186.82/km^{2}).

Racial composition as of the 2020 census
Race	Number	Percent
White	1,132	89.6%
Black or African American	3	0.2%
American Indian and Alaska Native	1	0.1%
Asian	2	0.2%
Native Hawaiian and Other Pacific Islander	0	0.0%
Some other race	49	3.9%
Two or more races	76	6.0%
Hispanic or Latino (of any race)	127	10.1%

=== Income and poverty ===
The median income for a household in the village was $59,737, and the median income for a family was $87,632. Males had a median income of $60,125 versus $28,452 for females. The per capita income for the village was $29,588. About 6.2% of families and 9.3% of the population were below the poverty line, including 12.8% of those under age 18 and 5.7% of those age 65 or over.

== Transportation ==
While there is no fixed-route transit service in Ladd, intercity bus service is provided by Burlington Trailways in nearby Peru.

== Notable person ==
- Henry J. Knauf, Illinois legislator and businessman, lived in Ladd.
