= DePue, Illinois =

- Village
- Village of DePue
- Location of De Pue in Bureau County, Illinois
- Coordinates: 41°19′27″N 89°18′24″W
- Country: United States
- State: Illinois
- County: Bureau
- Townships: Selby, Hall
- Founded: 1853
- Founded by: Benjamin Newell

Government
  - Village President: Dan Hoffert

Area
  - Total: 2.55 sq mi (6.61 km^{2})
  - Land: 2.45 sq mi (6.34 km^{2})
  - Water: 0.11 sq mi (0.28 km^{2})
- Elevation: 469 ft (143 m)

Population (2020)
  - Total: 1,633
  - Estimate (2024): 1,573
  - Density: 667.4/sq mi (257.69/km^{2})
- Time zone: UTC-6 (CST)
  - Summer (DST): UTC-5 (CDT)
- ZIP code: 61322
- Area code: 815
- FIPS code: 17-19499
- GNIS feature ID: 407138
- Website: www.villageofdepue.gov

DePue is a village in Bureau County, Illinois, United States. The population was 1,633 at the 2020 census. It is part of the Ottawa Micropolitan Statistical Area.

== History ==
DePue, originally called Trenton, was established in 1853 by site owner Benjamin Newell. Its name was changed to Sherman in 1865, De Pue on May 6, 1867, and DePue on July 14, 1894. The present name refers to an early French fur trader by the name of De Pue.

The site had long been used as a port and ice harvesting center on the Illinois River.

In 1905, the Mineral Point Zinc Company started a plant to produce slab zinc for automobiles and appliances in DePue, taking advantage of the nearby coalfields and trained labor force of the LaSalle-Peru zinc processing center. The plant was shortly after acquired by New Jersey Zinc and finally closed in 1990.

== Geography ==
According to the 2021 census gazetteer files, De Pue has a total area of 3.00 square miles (7.77 km^{2}), of which 2.78 square miles (7.20 km^{2}) (or 92.53%) is land and 0.22 square miles (0.57 km^{2}) (or 7.47%) is water.

== Demographics ==
Historical population
Census	Pop.	Note	%±
1880	323		—
1890	455		40.9%
1900	488		7.3%
1910	1,339		174.4%
1920	2,428		81.3%
1930	2,200		−9.4%
1940	2,296		4.4%
1950	2,163		−5.8%
1960	1,920		−11.2%
1970	1,919		−0.1%
1980	1,873		−2.4%
1990	1,729		−7.7%
2000	1,842		6.5%
2010	1,838		−0.2%
2020	1,633		−11.2%
U.S. Decennial Census

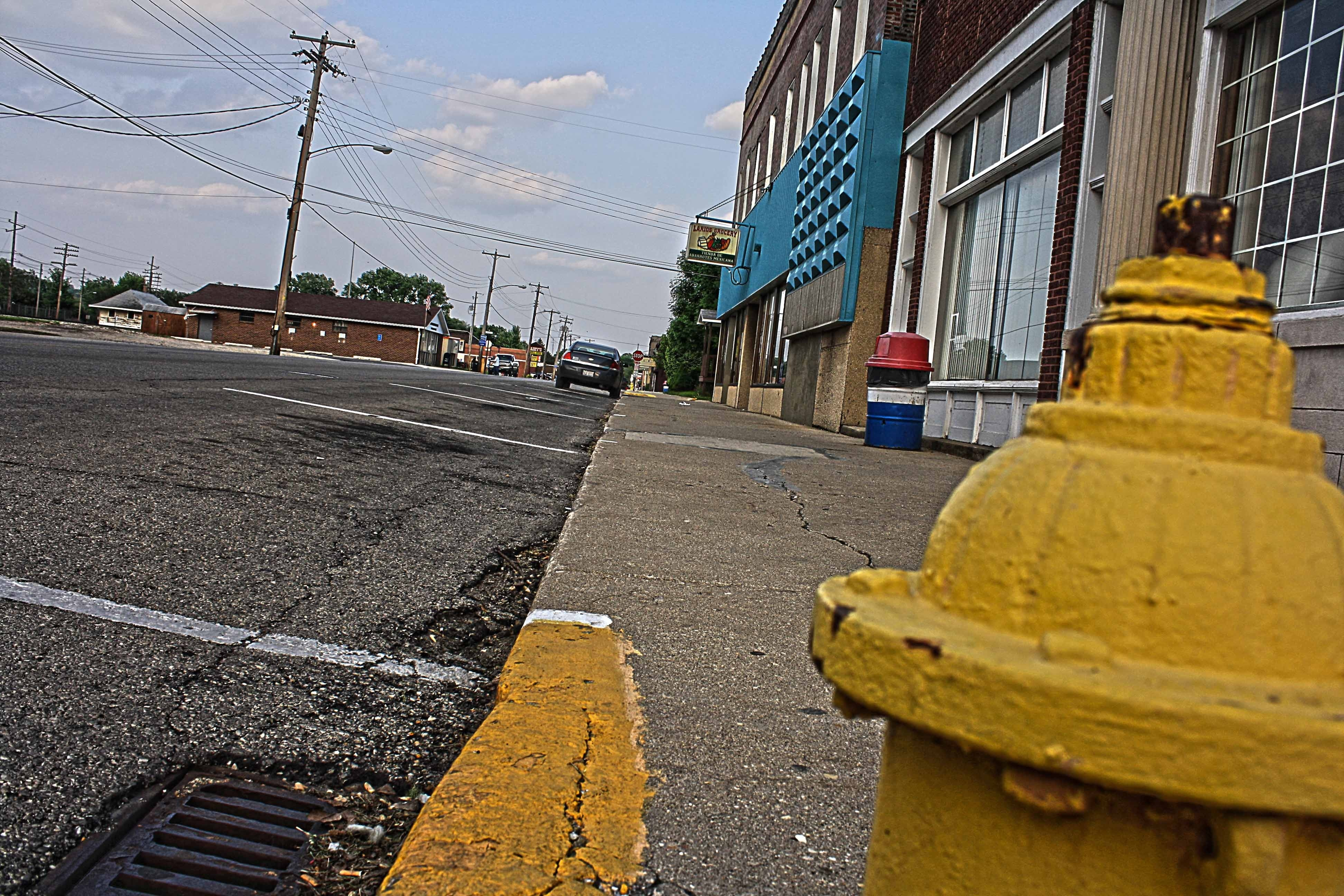
West 4th Street in DePue serves as the business district for the village.

As of the 2020 census there were 1,633 people, 591 households, and 452 families residing in the village. The population density was 544.51 inhabitants per square mile (210.24/km^{2}). There were 661 housing units at an average density of 220.41 per square mile (85.10/km^{2}). The racial makeup of the village was 45.62% White, 1.35% African American, 2.57% Native American, 2.94% Asian, 0.06% Pacific Islander, 23.09% from other races, and 24.37% from two or more races. Hispanic or Latino people of any race were 60.50% of the population.

There were 591 households, out of which 41.3% had children under the age of 18 living with them, 55.84% were married couples living together, 8.97% had a female householder with no husband present, and 23.52% were non-families. 18.44% of all households were made up of individuals, and 11.17% had someone living alone who was 65 years of age or older. The average household size was 3.19 and the average family size was 2.92.

The village's age distribution consisted of 29.4% under the age of 18, 6.3% from 18 to 24, 26.4% from 25 to 44, 22.9% from 45 to 64, and 15.1% who were 65 years of age or older. The median age was 35.6 years. For every 100 females, there were 140.8 males. For every 100 females age 18 and over, there were 161.4 males.

The median income for a household in the village was $61,553, and the median income for a family was $62,500. Males had a median income of $33,182 versus $23,786 for females. The per capita income for the village was $24,607. About 9.7% of families and 14.4% of the population were below the poverty line, including 25.5% of those under age 18 and 6.2% of those age 65 or over.

== Lake DePue ==
The lake and adjacent park feature wildlife and recreation. The American Power Boat Association (APBA) and the DePue Men's Club (a social and volunteer organization) host a weekend of boat racing on Lake DePue. The event draws spectators from across the country and brings entertainment and food vendors to the lakeside park.

Barack Obama visited when he was an Illinois legislator.

In a January 16, 2011 news story featured in the online edition of the Peoria Journal Star, Associated Press reporter Tammy Webber reported that the oxbow lake, surrounded by a Superfund site, is polluted by high levels of metals such as zinc, lead, arsenic, cadmium, and chromium because of the smelting activity that takes place there for the automotive and appliance industries, chiefly by New Jersey Zinc and Mobil Chemical. The village is urging Illinois Attorney General Lisa Madigan to investigate whether the Illinois Environmental Protection Agency, which has oversight over the case, is pushing the companies hard enough. This is important because the town alleges the companies and the IEPA have not done enough to combat the pollution that has made the lake markedly shallower. This phenomenon could, unless rapidly remedied, soon interfere with the small municipality's efforts to keep its remaining revenue source for most supplemental projects, the competition. The manufacturing jobs have now entirely disappeared.

In the summer of 2012, as a result of both the summer's drought and Lake DePue's pollution, the APBA nearly cancelled its National Championship Races due to the shallow water. In a display of community and hard work, DePue's citizens built a dam at the mouth of the lake and raised the water by using pumps and the lake's springs to the level required for racing in a matter of weeks.

== Education ==
One school building hosts all three village schools, the elementary, the junior high, and the DePue High School. They each have classes in different wings. The name of the school district is DePue Unit Schools District #103.

Extracurricular activities offered for grade 6–12 students include sports and clubs. DePue Junior High School offers boys' and girls' basketball, girls' volleyball, cheerleading, and track. DePue High School offers boys' and girls' basketball, soccer, girls' volleyball, cheerleading, and track. Extracurricular activities for the junior high school include Art Club, Student Council, Spelling Bee, Video Game Club, and Chess Club. High school activities include Student Council, National Honor Society, and the Activity Club. Annual activities that many clubs sponsor include JH Movie Nights, HS Homecoming and dances, as well as class trips throughout the year.
