= Ohio High School (Ohio, Illinois) =

Location
- 103 Memorial Street, PO Box 478; Ohio, Bureau County, Illinois 61349; United States
- Coordinates: 41.55787°N 89.4602°W

Information
- Type: Comprehensive Public High School
- School district: Ohio Community High School District 505
- Principal: Jason Wilt
- Teaching staff: 5.00 (FTE)
- Grades: 9–12
- Enrollment: 26 (2023–2024)
- Student to teacher ratio: 5.20
- Campus type: Rural, fringe
- Colors: Purple, Gold
- Mascot: Bulldogs

Ohio High School, or OHS, is a public four-year high school located at 103 Memorial Street in Ohio, Illinois, a village in Bureau County, Illinois, in the Midwestern United States. OHS serves the community and surrounding area of Ohio. The campus is located 25 miles (40 km) southeast of Sterling, Illinois, and serves a mixed village and rural residential community.

It is operated by the Ohio Community High School District 505, which includes Ohio. The district is mostly in Bureau County, and extends into Lee County.

== Academics ==
Ohio High School did not make Adequate Yearly Progress, with 12% of students meeting or exceeding expectations, on the Prairie State Achievement Exam (PSAE), Illinois' state test that is part of the No Child Left Behind Act. The average high school graduation rate between 1999 and 2009 was 56%.

== Athletics ==
Ohio High School is a member school in the Illinois High School Association. Their mascot is the Bulldogs, with school colors of purple and gold. The school has no state championships on record in team athletics and activities.

Due to OHS' small enrollment, they coop with neighboring schools Amboy and La Moille High Schools for most sports.

=== Cooperative arrangements ===
note: Highlighted school is the host

- Amboy, La Moille and Ohio High Schools co-operate for boys cross country. (Co-Op ends 2018)
- Amboy, La Moille and Ohio High Schools co-operate for girls cross country. (Co-Op ends 2018)
- Amboy, La Moille and Ohio High Schools co-operate for boys football. (Co-Op ends 2018)
- Amboy, La Moille and Ohio High Schools co-operate for boys golf. (Co-Op ends 2018)
- Amboy, La Moille and Ohio High Schools co-operate for girls golf. (Co-Op ends 2018)
- Amboy, La Moille and Ohio High Schools co-operate for boys track & field. (Co-Op ends 2018)
- Amboy, La Moille and Ohio High Schools co-operate for girls track & field. (Co-Op ends 2018)
- Amboy, La Moille and Ohio High Schools co-operate for boys wrestling. (Co-Op ends 2018)
- La Moille and Ohio High Schools co-operate for boys baseball. (Co-Op ends 2018)
- La Moille and Ohio High Schools co-operate for boys basketball. (Co-Op ends 2018)
- La Moille and Ohio High Schools co-operate for girls basketball. (Co-Op ends 2018)
- La Moille and Ohio High Schools co-operate for girls softball. (Co-Op ends 2018)
- La Moille and Ohio High Schools co-operate for girls volleyball. (Co-Op ends 2018)
