= Thomas, Illinois =

- Unincorporated community
- Location within Illinois Location within the United States
- Coordinates: 41°30′42″N 89°49′10″W
- Country: United States
- State: Illinois
- County: Bureau
- Elevation: 627 ft (191 m)
- Time zone: UTC-6 (Central (CST))
  - Summer (DST): UTC-5 (CDT)
- Area codes: 815 & 779
- GNIS feature ID: 419654

Thomas is an unincorporated community in Bureau County, Illinois, United States, located west of New Bedford.
