= Limerick, Illinois =

- Unincorporated community
- Location within Illinois Location within the United States
- Coordinates: 41°29′41″N 89°28′01″W
- Country: United States
- State: Illinois
- County: Bureau
- Elevation: 732 ft (223 m)
- Time zone: UTC-6 (Central (CST))
  - Summer (DST): UTC-5 (CDT)
- Area codes: 815 & 779
- GNIS feature ID: 422914

Limerick is an unincorporated community in Bureau County, Illinois, United States, located on Illinois Route 26, north of Princeton.

== History ==
The town was laid out in 1857 by George Limerick, a pioneer settler. A post office called Limerick was established that same year, and remained in operation until 1892. Limerick had a meeting house, store, blacksmith, physician, Methodist church, and about 15 to 20 dwellings.
