= Ohio, Illinois =

- Village
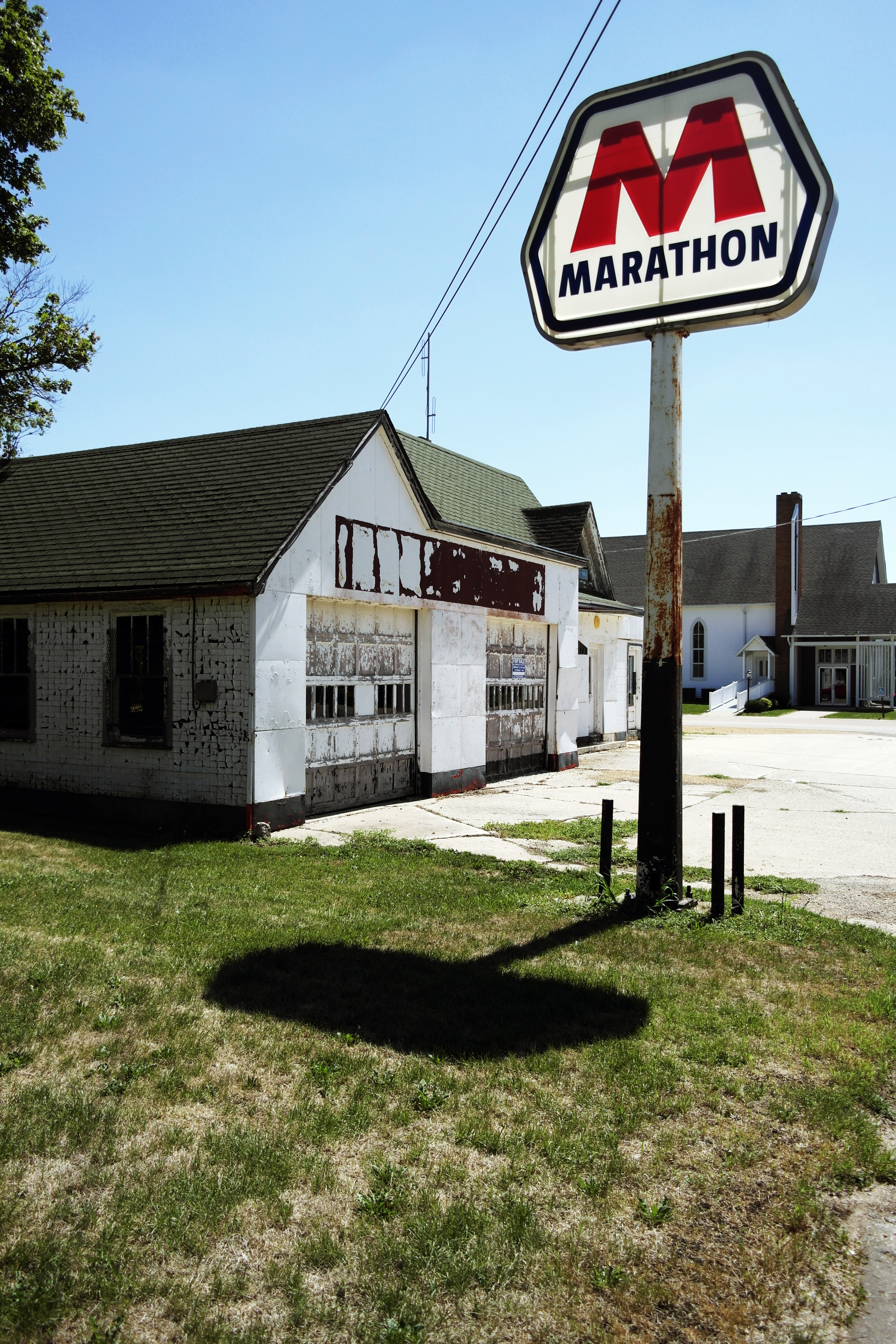
- Old Marathon Filling Station, Ohio, Illinois

- Location of Ohio in Bureau County, Illinois.
- Coordinates: 41°33′18″N 89°27′37″W
- Country: United States
- State: Illinois
- County: Bureau
- Township: Ohio

Area
  - Total: 0.753 sq mi (1.95 km^{2})
  - Land: 0.753 sq mi (1.95 km^{2})
  - Water: 0.00 sq mi (0 km^{2})
- Elevation: 889 ft (271 m)

Population (2020)
  - Total: 465
  - Density: 618/sq mi (238/km^{2})
- Time zone: UTC-6 (CST)
  - Summer (DST): UTC-5 (CDT)
- ZIP Code(s): 61349
- Area codes: 815 & 779
- FIPS code: 17-55379
- GNIS feature ID: 2399562

Ohio is a village in Bureau County, Illinois, United States. The population was 465 at the 2020 census. It is part of the Ottawa Micropolitan Statistical Area.

== History ==
Ohio was first incorporated as a village on January 22, 1877. A post office called Ohio has been in operation since 1854. The village was named after the state of Ohio.

== Geography ==
According to the 2021 census gazetteer files, Ohio has a total area of 0.75 square miles (1.94 km^{2}), all land.

== Demographics ==
Historical population
Census	Pop.	Note	%±
1880	385		—
1890	364		−5.5%
1900	461		26.6%
1910	527		14.3%
1920	874		65.8%
1930	510		−41.6%
1940	524		2.7%
1950	561		7.1%
1960	489		−12.8%
1970	506		3.5%
1980	544		7.5%
1990	426		−21.7%
2000	540		26.8%
2010	513		−5.0%
2020	465		−9.4%
U.S. Decennial Census

As of the 2020 census there were 465 people, 227 households, and 150 families residing in the village. The population density was 617.53 inhabitants per square mile (238.43/km^{2}). There were 239 housing units at an average density of 317.40 per square mile (122.55/km^{2}). The racial makeup of the village was 92.90% White, 0.65% African American, 0.65% Asian, 0.65% from other races, and 5.16% from two or more races. Hispanic or Latino of any race were 2.15% of the population.

There were 227 households, out of which 19.8% had children under the age of 18 living with them, 39.65% were married couples living together, 25.11% had a female householder with no husband present, and 33.92% were non-families. 31.28% of all households were made up of individuals, and 16.30% had someone living alone who was 65 years of age or older. The average household size was 2.62 and the average family size was 2.22.

The village's age distribution consisted of 12.8% under the age of 18, 10.2% from 18 to 24, 26.7% from 25 to 44, 30.2% from 45 to 64, and 20.0% who were 65 years of age or older. The median age was 45.2 years. For every 100 females, there were 89.2 males. For every 100 females age 18 and over, there were 100.0 males.

The median income for a household in the village was $60,208, and the median income for a family was $61,944. Males had a median income of $49,500 versus $14,489 for females. The per capita income for the village was $31,656. About 1.3% of families and 13.0% of the population were below the poverty line, including none of those under age 18 and 16.5% of those age 65 or over.

== Education ==
Public education in Ohio is provided by Ohio Community Consolidated Grade School District #17 and Ohio Community High School District #505. The district maintains a single building with both Elementary and Jr./Sr. High School. Each district is administrated by a seven-member Board of Education, which includes a president and vice president. Ohio has formed cooperative teams with Amboy and LaMoille school districts for several team sports. Ohio is located within the Sauk Valley Community College district with tuition and fees at the in-district rate.

The 29-3 Ohio High School boys basketball team of 1985-86 made it to the IHSA Class A Tournament Championship game and bought home the 2nd Place Trophy—the smallest Illinois school (69 students) to play for a state title in any sport. Led by Coach Lloyd Johnson and Players Brad Bickett, Lance Harris, Darren Schultz, Tim Farraher, the three Doran Brothers, and Todd Etheridge, this team was also 79-9 over a 3-year span.
