= Seatonville, Illinois =

Seatonville
- Village
- Location of Seatonville in Bureau County, Illinois.
- Coordinates: 41°21′48″N 89°16′23″W
- Country: United States
- State: Illinois
- County: Bureau
- Townships: Hall, Selby

Area
  - Total: 0.511 sq mi (1.32 km^{2})
  - Land: 0.496 sq mi (1.28 km^{2})
  - Water: 0.015 sq mi (0.039 km^{2})
- Elevation: 584 ft (178 m)

Population (2020)
  - Total: 321
  - Density: 647/sq mi (250/km^{2})
- Time zone: UTC-6 (CST)
  - Summer (DST): UTC-5 (CDT)
- ZIP Code(s): 61359
- Area code: 815
- FIPS code: 17-68471
- GNIS feature ID: 2399780

Seatonville is a village in Bureau County, Illinois, United States. The population was 321 at the 2020 census. It is part of the Ottawa Micropolitan Statistical Area.

== History ==
A post office called Seatonville has been in operation since 1889, named for W. A. Seaton, an early settler.

The town is part of a constellation of coal mining towns centered on Spring Valley and LaSalle, Illinois. The Seaton brothers, Isom and James, sank the first coal mine shaft there in 1880. The mine was sold in 1888 to the Chicago, Wilmington, and Vermilion Coal Company based in Braidwood, Illinois. During the strike of 1889, it was the only mine operating in northern Illinois. A small community of African-Americans was brought in by the company to replace deserting miners.

The mine went bankrupt in 1900 and was purchased by the Spring Valley Coal Company. The town grew until the mine was closed in 1913.

== Geography ==
According to the 2021 census gazetteer files, Seatonville has a total area of 0.51 square miles (1.32 km^{2}), of which 0.50 square miles (1.29 km^{2}) (or 97.06%) is land and 0.02 square miles (0.05 km^{2}) (or 2.94%) is water.

== Demographics ==
Historical population
Census	Pop.	Note	%±
1890	536		—
1900	909		69.6%
1910	1,370		50.7%
1920	534		−61.0%
1930	373		−30.1%
1940	415		11.3%
1950	405		−2.4%
1960	363		−10.4%
1970	318		−12.4%
1980	369		16.0%
1990	259		−29.8%
2000	303		17.0%
2010	314		3.6%
2020	321		2.2%
U.S. Decennial Census

As of the 2020 census there were 321 people, 188 households, and 111 families residing in the village. The population density was 628.18 inhabitants per square mile (242.54/km^{2}). There were 141 housing units at an average density of 275.93 per square mile (106.54/km^{2}). The racial makeup of the village was 91.59% White, 0.31% Native American, 4.05% Asian, 0.93% from other races, and 3.12% from two or more races. Hispanic or Latino of any race were 4.98% of the population.

There were 188 households, out of which 27.7% had children under the age of 18 living with them, 36.70% were married couples living together, 19.68% had a female householder with no husband present, and 40.96% were non-families. 39.36% of all households were made up of individuals, and 31.91% had someone living alone who was 65 years of age or older. The average household size was 2.50 and the average family size was 1.98.

The village's age distribution consisted of 19.6% under the age of 18, 7.3% from 18 to 24, 20.1% from 25 to 44, 22% from 45 to 64, and 30.9% who were 65 years of age or older. The median age was 49.3 years. For every 100 females, there were 97.9 males. For every 100 females age 18 and over, there were 112.1 males.

The median income for a household in the village was $39,405, and the median income for a family was $50,938. Males had a median income of $46,500 versus $18,750 for females. The per capita income for the village was $27,401. About 20.7% of families and 16.1% of the population were below the poverty line, including 17.8% of those under age 18 and 4.3% of those age 65 or over.

== Notable person ==
- Jack Kibble, third baseman for the Cleveland Naps; born in Seatonville
