= Kasbeer, Illinois =

- Unincorporated community
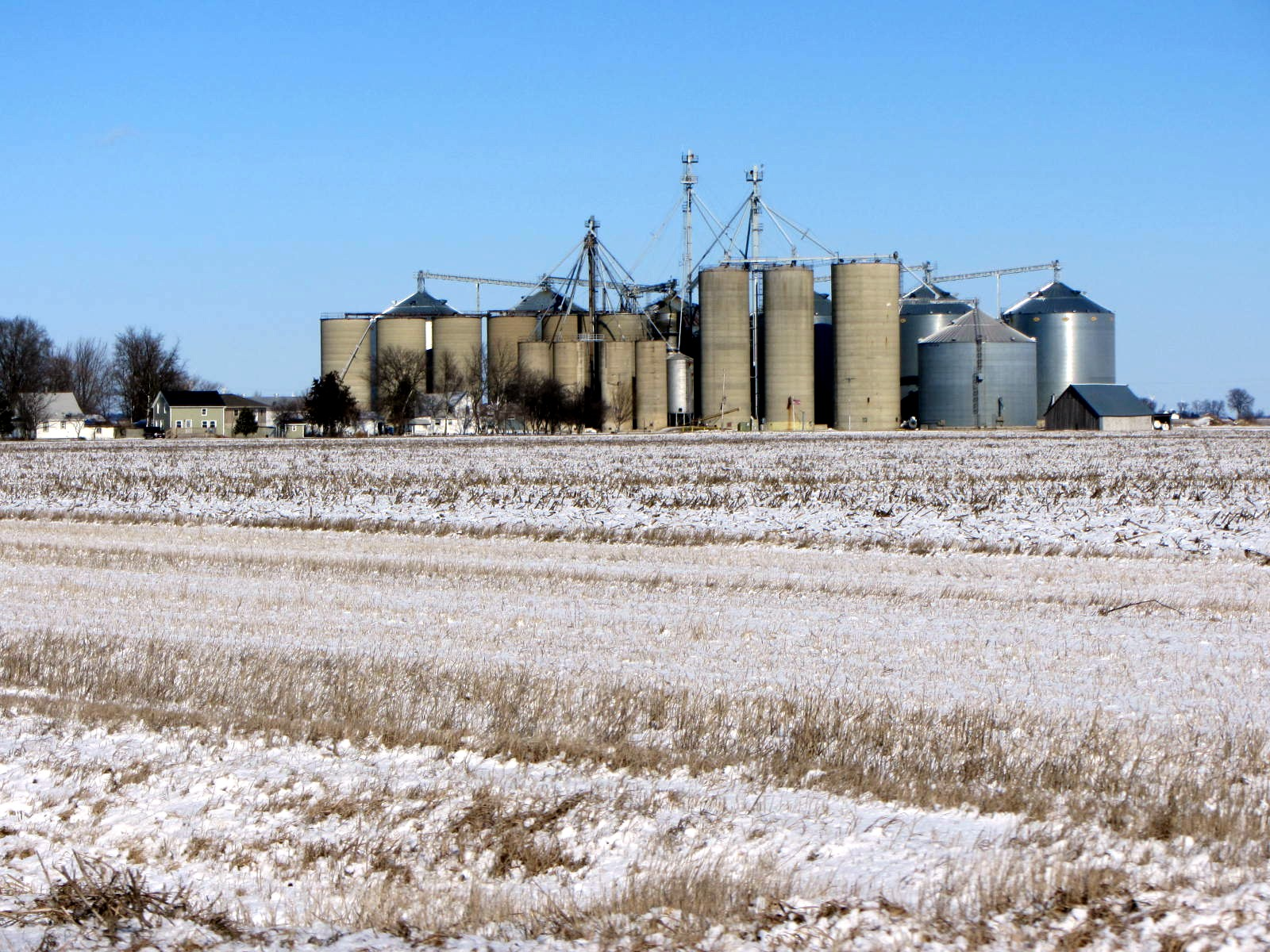
- Kasbeer grain elevator

- Location within Illinois Location within the United States
- Coordinates: 41°30′18″N 89°27′48″W
- Country: United States
- State: Illinois
- County: Bureau
- Elevation: 741 ft (226 m)
- Time zone: UTC-6 (Central (CST))
  - Summer (DST): UTC-5 (CDT)
- ZIP code: 61328
- Area codes: 815 & 779
- GNIS feature ID: 411318

Kasbeer is an unincorporated community in Bureau County, Illinois, United States. Kasbeer is located along Illinois Route 26, north of Princeton and south of Ohio. The town of Kasbeer was originally begun 1/2-mile to the south of its current location, but formed when the railroad routed its tracks to the north. This small rural cornbelt town was named after Asa Kasbeer, a farmer on that land, and his family. Currently, the town has only a Church and Post Office, other than its 30 houses and Grain Elevator; however, in an earlier time also had a two-building Grade School, General Store and gas station, barber shop, auto mechanic's garage, lumber yard, small cement block plant, television sales and service store, tavern, and for a short while a bank. Kasbeer is one of many small towns which is within the Princeton School District.
