= Coal Hollow, Illinois =

- Unincorporated community
- Location within Illinois Location within the United States
- Coordinates: 41°21′56″N 89°21′48″W
- Country: United States
- State: Illinois
- County: Bureau
- Elevation: 577 ft (176 m)
- Time zone: UTC-6 (Central (CST))
  - Summer (DST): UTC-5 (CDT)
- Area codes: 815 & 779
- GNIS feature ID: 422565

Coal Hollow is an unincorporated community in Bureau County, Illinois, United States, located on U.S. Route 6, east of Princeton.
