= Webster Park, Illinois =

- Unincorporated community
- Location within Illinois Location within the United States
- Coordinates: 41°19′27″N 89°10′41″W
- Country: United States
- State: Illinois
- County: Bureau
- Elevation: 607 ft (185 m)
- Time zone: UTC-6 (Central (CST))
  - Summer (DST): UTC-5 (CDT)
- Area codes: 815 & 779
- GNIS feature ID: 1721026

Webster Park is an unincorporated community in Bureau County, Illinois, United States, located east of Spring Valley.
