= Milo, Illinois =

- Unincorporated community
- Location within Illinois Location within the United States
- Coordinates: 41°11′33″N 89°34′56″W
- Country: United States
- State: Illinois
- County: Bureau
- Elevation: 886 ft (270 m)
- Time zone: UTC-6 (Central (CST))
  - Summer (DST): UTC-5 (CDT)
- Area codes: 815 & 779
- GNIS feature ID: 413630

Milo is an unincorporated community in Bureau County, Illinois, United States, located east-northeast of Bradford.
