= Bureau County, Illinois =

County in Illinois, United States

- County
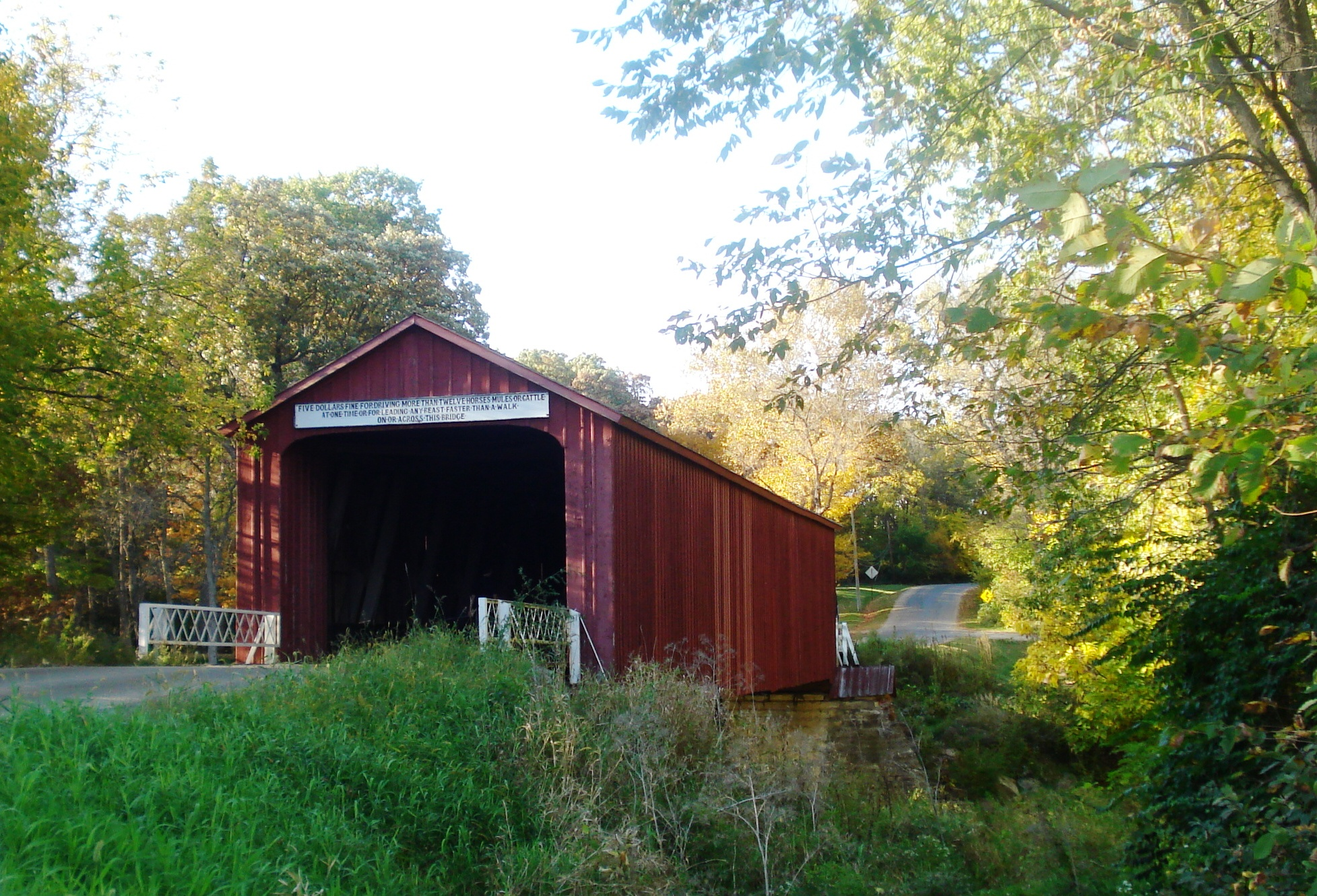
- Red Covered Bridge (1863)

- Location within the U.S. state of Illinois
- Coordinates: 41°25′N 89°32′W
- Country: United States
- State: Illinois
- Founded: 1837
- Seat: Princeton
- Largest city: Princeton

Area
  - Total: 874 sq mi (2,260 km^{2})
  - Land: 869 sq mi (2,250 km^{2})
  - Water: 4.5 sq mi (12 km^{2}) 0.5%

Population (2020)
  - Total: 33,244
  - Estimate (2025): 32,510 ▼
  - Density: 38.3/sq mi (14.8/km^{2})
- Time zone: UTC−6 (Central)
  - Summer (DST): UTC−5 (CDT)
- Congressional districts: 14th, 16th
- Website: bureaucounty-il.gov

Bureau County is a county located in the U.S. state of Illinois. As of the 2020 United States census, the population was 33,244. Its county seat is Princeton. Bureau County is part of the Ottawa, Illinois, Micropolitan Statistical Area, and the Hennepin Canal Parkway State Park is located partly in this county.

== History ==
Bureau County was created from a portion of Putnam County in 1837. It is named for brothers Michel and Pierre Bureau, French Canadians who ran a trading post from 1776 until the 1780s near the conjunction of Big Bureau Creek with Illinois River. Their actual surname most likely was Belleau, but the local American Indians had difficulty pronouncing the "l" sound, which was not found in some local languages. An early settler of this area was Bulbona, a man of mixed French and Native American descent with a Native American wife. Unlike most of the other Native Americans in the area, Bulbona remained after the area was settled by Euro-Americans and ran a trading post, where he sold whiskey among other necessities.

The founders of Princeton, the area's oldest town, were settlers from New England, descendants of the English Puritans who settled New England in the 17th century. They were part of a wave of New England farmers who moved to the Northwest Territory in the early 19th century. Most of them came soon after of the completion of the Erie Canal. When they arrived, they faced virgin forest and wild prairie. These New Englanders laid out farms, constructed roads, erected government buildings and established post routes. They brought with them many of their Yankee New England values, such as a passion for education, establishing many schools, and were staunch abolitionists. They were mostly members of the Congregationalist Church or Episcopalians. Early Bureau County, like much of northern Illinois, was culturally very continuous with early New England culture.

Like so many other areas in the Midwest, this county was on a "line" of the Underground Railroad. There was a "station" at the home of Owen Lovejoy in Princeton, and several other locations in the county.

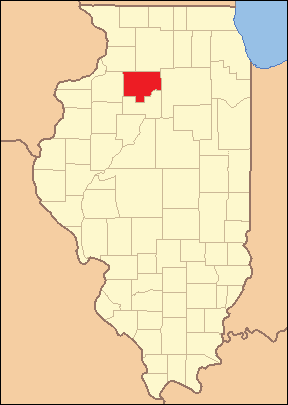
Bureau County's boundaries have remained unchanged since its creation in 1837.

== Geography ==
According to the US Census Bureau, the county has a total area of 874 square miles (2,260 km^{2}), of which 869 square miles (2,250 km^{2}) is land and 4.5 square miles (12 km^{2}) (0.5%) is water. Big Bureau Creek is the main body of water.

=== Adjacent counties ===
- Whiteside County - northwest
- Lee County - north
- LaSalle County - east
- Putnam County - southeast
- Marshall County - south
- Stark County - southwest
- Henry County - west

=== Major highways ===
- Interstate 80
- Interstate 180
- U.S. Route 6
- U.S. Route 34
- Illinois Route 26
- Illinois Route 29
- Illinois Route 40
- Illinois Route 89
- Illinois Route 92

== Climate and weather ==
Princeton, Illinois

Climate chart (precipitation, max. and min. temperature)
J	F	M	A	M	J	J	A	S	O	N	D
1.7 29 14	1.5 35 20	2.5 47 30	3.8 61 40	4.1 73 51	4.4 82 61	3.3 85 65	4.8 82 63	3.7 75 55	2.9 63 43	2.9 47 31	2.5 33 19
- █ Average max. and min. temperatures in °F
- █ Precipitation totals in inches
- Source: The Weather Channel
Metric conversion
J	F	M	A	M	J	J	A	S	O	N	D
42 −2 −10	38 2 −7	62 8 −1	96 16 4	104 23 11	111 28 16	85 29 18	121 28 17	93 24 13	75 17 6	74 8 −1	62 1 −7
- █ Average max. and min. temperatures in °C
- █ Precipitation totals in mm

In recent years, average temperatures in the county seat of Princeton have ranged from a low of 14 °F (−10 °C) in January to a high of 85 °F (29 °C) in July, although a record low of −22 °F (−30 °C) was recorded in February 1996 and a record high of 102 °F (39 °C) was recorded in June 1988. Average monthly precipitation ranged from 1.48 inches (38 mm) in February to 4.76 inches (121 mm) in August.

== Demographics ==
2000 census age pyramid for Bureau County

Historical population
Census	Pop.	Note	%±
1840	3,067		—
1850	8,841		188.3%
1860	26,426		198.9%
1870	32,415		22.7%
1880	33,172		2.3%
1890	35,014		5.6%
1900	41,112		17.4%
1910	43,975		7.0%
1920	42,648		−3.0%
1930	38,845		−8.9%
1940	37,600		−3.2%
1950	37,711		0.3%
1960	37,594		−0.3%
1970	38,541		2.5%
1980	39,114		1.5%
1990	35,688		−8.8%
2000	35,503		−0.5%
2010	34,978		−1.5%
2020	33,244		−5.0%
2025 (est.)	32,510	▼	−2.2%
US Decennial Census; 1790-1960 1900-1990; 1990-2000 2010-2013

=== 2020 census ===
Bureau County, Illinois – Racial and ethnic composition Note: the US Census treats Hispanic/Latino as an ethnic category. This table excludes Latinos from the racial categories and assigns them to a separate category. Hispanics/Latinos may be of any race.
Race / Ethnicity (NH = Non-Hispanic)	Pop 1980	Pop 1990	Pop 2000	Pop 2010	Pop 2020	% 1980	% 1990	% 2000	% 2010	% 2020
White alone (NH)	38,085	34,389	33,196	31,473	28,511	97.37%	96.36%	93.50%	89.98%	85.76%
Black or African American alone (NH)	43	50	110	191	259	0.11%	0.14%	0.31%	0.55%	0.78%
Native American or Alaska Native alone (NH)	125	61	53	63	49	0.32%	0.17%	0.15%	0.18%	0.15%
Asian alone (NH)	52	182	181	220	298	0.13%	0.51%	0.51%	0.63%	0.90%
Native Hawaiian or Pacific Islander alone (NH)	x	x	10	6	21	x	x	0.03%	0.02%	0.06%
Other race alone (NH)	0	3	6	4	51	0.00%	0.01%	0.02%	0.01%	0.15%
Mixed race or Multiracial (NH)	x	x	215	326	960	x	x	0.61%	0.93%	2.89%
Hispanic or Latino (any race)	809	1,003	1,732	2,695	3,095	2.07%	2.81%	4.88%	7.70%	9.31%
Total	39,114	35,688	35,503	34,978	33,244	100.00%	100.00%	100.00%	100.00%	100.00%

As of the 2020 census, the county had a population of 33,244. The median age was 44.8 years. 21.2% of residents were under the age of 18 and 22.4% of residents were 65 years of age or older. For every 100 females there were 97.6 males, and for every 100 females age 18 and over there were 95.5 males age 18 and over.

The racial makeup of the county was 88.3% White, 0.8% Black or African American, 0.4% American Indian and Alaska Native, 0.9% Asian, 0.1% Native Hawaiian and Pacific Islander, 3.3% from some other race, and 6.2% from two or more races. Hispanic or Latino residents of any race comprised 9.3% of the population.

45.0% of residents lived in urban areas, while 55.0% lived in rural areas.

There were 14,179 households in the county, of which 26.4% had children under the age of 18 living in them. Of all households, 47.4% were married-couple households, 19.4% were households with a male householder and no spouse or partner present, and 25.5% were households with a female householder and no spouse or partner present. About 31.7% of all households were made up of individuals and 15.2% had someone living alone who was 65 years of age or older.

There were 15,616 housing units, of which 9.2% were vacant. Among occupied housing units, 74.8% were owner-occupied and 25.2% were renter-occupied. The homeowner vacancy rate was 1.8% and the rental vacancy rate was 7.1%.

=== 2010 census ===
As of the 2010 United States census, there were 34,978 people, 14,262 households, and 9,605 families residing in the county. The population density was 40.2 inhabitants per square mile (15.5/km^{2}). There were 15,720 housing units at an average density of 18.1 per square mile (7.0/km^{2}). The racial makeup of the county was 94.2% white, 0.7% Asian, 0.6% black or African American, 0.3% American Indian, 3.0% from other races, and 1.3% from two or more races. Those of Hispanic or Latino origin made up 7.7% of the population. In terms of ancestry, 32.8% were German, 13.8% were Irish, 12.1% were English, 9.2% were American, 8.8% were Italian, 7.6% were Swedish, and 5.8% were Polish.

Of the 14,262 households, 29.8% had children under the age of 18 living with them, 53.6% were married couples living together, 9.2% had a female householder with no husband present, 32.7% were non-families, and 28.0% of all households were made up of individuals. The average household size was 2.42 and the average family size was 2.94. The median age was 42.5 years.

The median income for a household in the county was $45,692 and the median income for a family was $55,217. Males had a median income of $42,327 versus $29,210 for females. The per capita income for the county was $24,103. About 8.6% of families and 11.1% of the population were below the poverty line, including 15.3% of those under age 18 and 7.5% of those age 65 or over.

== Communities ==
Community	Community type	Population	Total Area	Water Area	Land Area	Pop. Density
Arlington	village	169	0.40	0.00	0.40	427.85
Buda	village	482	1.01	0.00	1.01	475.35
Bureau Junction	village	281	1.51	0.07	1.45	190
Cherry	village	435	0.51	0.00	0.51	850
Dalzell (part)	village	663	0.83	0.01	0.82	808.54
DePue	village	1,633	2.55	0.11	2.45	667.35
Dover	village	135	0.29	0.00	0.28	470
Hollowayville	village	36	0.05	0.00	0.05	734.69
La Moille	village	679	1.16	0.00	1.16	590
Ladd	village	1,263	1.21	0.00	1.21	1,000
Malden	village	318	0.27	0.00	0.27	1,164.84
Manlius	village	298	0.32	0.00	0.32	934.17
Mineral	village	206	0.553	0.00	0.553	370
Neponset	village	427	1.016	0.00	1.016	420
New Bedford	village	76	0.155	0.00	0.155	490
Ohio	village	465	0.753	0.00	0.753	620
Princeton (seat)	city	7,832	8.24	0.00	8.24	950.49
Seatonville	village	321	0.511	0.015	0.496	630
Sheffield	village	821	1.169	0.00	1.169	700
Spring Valley	city	5,582	7.40	0.04	7.36	750
Tiskilwa	village	740	0.517	0.00	0.517	1,400
Walnut	village	1,311	0.801	0.00	0.801	1,600
Wyanet	village	886	0.946	0.00	0.946	940
Bureau County	county	33,244	874	4.5	869	38

=== Unincorporated communities ===
- Coal Hollow
- Clarion
- Kasbeer
- Limerick
- Lone Tree
- Marquette
- Milo
- Normandy
- Ottville
- Providence
- Thomas
- Van Orin
- Webster Park
- Whitefield
- Yorktown
- Zearing

=== Townships ===
- Arispie
- Berlin
- Bureau
- Clarion
- Concord
- Dover
- Fairfield
- Gold
- Greenville
- Hall
- Indiantown
- Lamoille
- Leepertown
- Macon
- Manlius
- Milo
- Mineral
- Neponset
- Ohio
- Princeton
- Selby
- Walnut
- Westfield
- Wheatland
- Wyanet

== Education ==
K-12 school districts include:

- Annawan Community Unit School District 226
- Bureau Valley Community Unit School District 340
- Bradford Community Unit School District 1
- Depue Community Unit School District 103
- Henry-Senachwine Consolidated Unit School District 5
- Kewanee Community Unit School District 229
- La Moille Community Unit School District 303
- Prophetstown-Lyndon-Tampico Community Unit School District 3
- Wethersfield Community Unit School District 230

Secondary school districts include:

- Hall High School District 502
- LaSalle-Peru Township High School District 120
- Mendota Township High School District 280
- Ohio Community High School District 505
- Princeton High School District 500

Elementary school districts include:

- Dalzell School District 98
- Dimmick Community Consolidated School District 175
- Ladd Community Consolidated School District 94
- Malden Community Consolidated School District 84
- Mendota Community Consolidated School District 289
- Ohio Community Consolidated School District 17
- Princeton Elementary School District 115
- Spring Valley Community Consolidated School District 99

== Notable people ==
- Charles W. Brooks, U.S. Senator
- Warren Giles, executive in Baseball Hall of Fame
- Virgil Fox, concert organist
- Kathryn Hays, actress
- Owen Lovejoy, abolitionist minister and U.S. congressman
- Rufus Lumry, abolitionist circuit preacher and early Illinois organizer of the Wesleyan Methodist Church
- Joseph R. Peterson, Illinois state legislator and lawyer
- Robert Petkoff, actor
- Eliza Suggs, author and temperance activist
- Richard Widmark, actor

== Politics ==
As part of Yankee-settled Northern Illinois, Bureau County became powerfully Republican for the century following the Civil War. The only Democrat to carry the county between 1856 and 1988 was Franklin D. Roosevelt during his landslide 1932 victory, although Progressive Theodore Roosevelt did carry the county during the 1912 election. Between 1988 and 2012, the county trended Democratic – Bill Clinton won pluralities in both his elections and Barack Obama won an absolute majority in 2008 and nearly did so in 2012 – however concern with lack of employment opportunities in the Rust Belt led to a powerful swing toward Donald Trump in 2016 for the best GOP result since Ronald Reagan’s 1984 landslide.

United States presidential election results for Bureau County, Illinois
Year	Republican		Democratic		Third party(ies)	
Year	No.	%	No.	%	No.	%
1892	3,924	47.96%	3,555	43.45%	702	8.58%
1896	5,474	56.31%	3,961	40.74%	287	2.95%
1900	5,478	56.90%	3,523	36.59%	626	6.50%
1904	5,624	64.31%	1,917	21.92%	1,204	13.77%
1908	5,280	57.48%	2,871	31.25%	1,035	11.27%
1912	1,816	19.84%	2,800	30.59%	4,537	49.57%
1916	8,213	56.20%	5,793	39.64%	608	4.16%
1920	9,968	74.94%	2,354	17.70%	980	7.37%
1924	9,457	60.38%	1,995	12.74%	4,211	26.89%
1928	11,557	63.73%	6,486	35.77%	90	0.50%
1932	8,721	45.23%	10,309	53.47%	250	1.30%
1936	10,462	51.48%	9,516	46.83%	344	1.69%
1940	13,258	61.36%	8,274	38.29%	75	0.35%
1944	11,802	62.68%	6,976	37.05%	51	0.27%
1948	11,207	63.15%	6,463	36.42%	78	0.44%
1952	14,300	69.76%	6,173	30.12%	25	0.12%
1956	13,909	70.56%	5,781	29.33%	21	0.11%
1960	12,597	61.73%	7,786	38.15%	24	0.12%
1964	9,552	51.25%	9,086	48.75%	0	0.00%
1968	11,216	59.97%	6,304	33.71%	1,183	6.33%
1972	12,786	67.47%	6,133	32.36%	33	0.17%
1976	10,854	58.20%	7,566	40.57%	228	1.22%
1980	11,484	61.79%	5,753	30.95%	1,350	7.26%
1984	11,741	62.57%	6,925	36.90%	99	0.53%
1988	8,896	54.41%	7,354	44.98%	101	0.62%
1992	6,836	38.18%	7,551	42.17%	3,520	19.66%
1996	6,528	40.61%	7,651	47.60%	1,894	11.78%
2000	8,526	50.68%	7,754	46.09%	543	3.23%
2004	9,822	54.87%	7,961	44.47%	119	0.66%
2008	7,911	46.12%	8,889	51.82%	353	2.06%
2012	8,164	48.93%	8,134	48.75%	388	2.33%
2016	9,281	56.01%	6,029	36.38%	1,261	7.61%
2020	10,411	59.51%	6,669	38.12%	414	2.37%
2024	9,784	60.88%	5,900	36.71%	387	2.41%

== See also ==
- National Register of Historic Places listings in Bureau County, Illinois
