= Wyanet, Illinois =

Wyanet
- Village
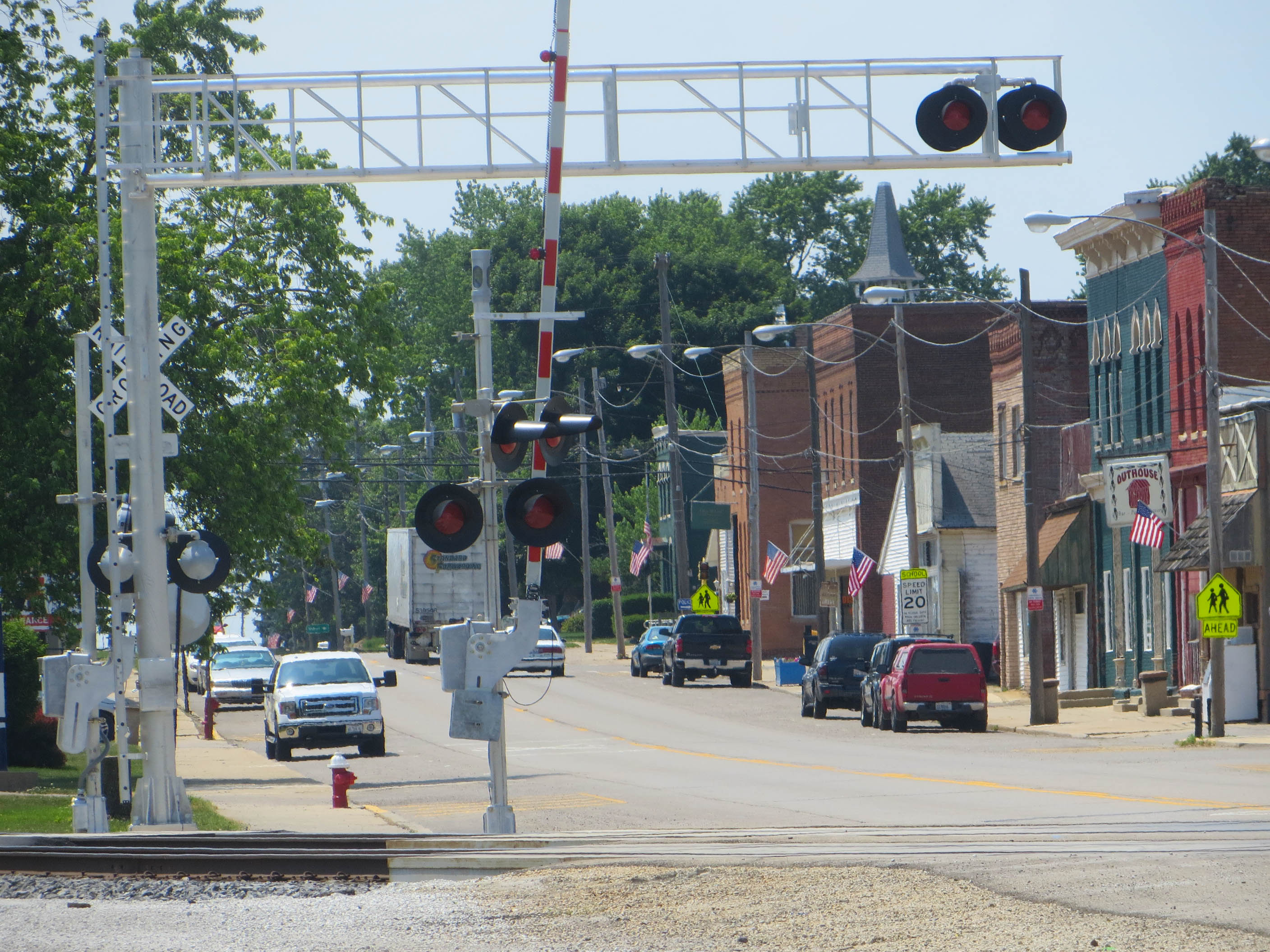
- Main Street in Wyanet
- Interactive map of Wyanet
- Coordinates: 41°21′39″N 89°34′58″W
- Country: United States
- State: Illinois
- County: Bureau
- Township: Wyanet

Area
  - Total: 0.946 sq mi (2.45 km^{2})
  - Land: 0.946 sq mi (2.45 km^{2})
  - Water: 0.00 sq mi (0 km^{2})
- Elevation: 653 ft (199 m)

Population (2020)
  - Total: 886
  - Density: 937/sq mi (362/km^{2})
- Time zone: UTC-6 (CST)
  - Summer (DST): UTC-5 (CDT)
- ZIP code: 61379
- Area codes: 815 & 779
- FIPS code: 17-83622
- GNIS feature ID: 2399746
- Website: www.wyanetil.com

Wyanet is a village in Bureau County, Illinois, United States. The population was 886 at the 2020 census. It is part of the Ottawa Micropolitan Statistical Area.

== History ==
Wyanet's history dates back to 1821; it was officially plated in 1854 and incorporated in 1857. The community has had several names since its beginning. In 1821 the settlement was first called "Center". Named by Bulbona an Indian trader. In 1837 the Village officially started to sprout its roots due to the area known as "Pond Creek". Named for the Creek at the South edge of town where Ellis Mercer built a saw mill and Amos Leonard built the first flour mill. The first railroad, the Chicago Rock Island & Pacific was built here in 1853. At this time the name was changed to "Kingston" in honor of the land donors Henry and Mary King. The Chicago, Burlington, Quincy Railroad gave the Village its current name, Wyanet, when they completed their rail line in 1855.

== Geography ==
According to the 2021 census gazetteer files, Wyanet has a total area of 0.95 square miles (2.46 km^{2}), all land.

== Demographics ==
Historical population
Census	Pop.	Note	%±
1880	737		—
1890	670		−9.1%
1900	902		34.6%
1910	872		−3.3%
1920	825		−5.4%
1930	859		4.1%
1940	868		1.0%
1950	950		9.4%
1960	938		−1.3%
1970	1,005		7.1%
1980	1,069		6.4%
1990	1,017		−4.9%
2000	1,028		1.1%
2010	991		−3.6%
2020	886		−10.6%
U.S. Decennial Census

As of the 2020 census, there were 886 people, 451 households, and 308 families residing in the village. The population density was 936.58 inhabitants per square mile (361.62/km^{2}). There were 405 housing units at an average density of 428.12 per square mile (165.30/km^{2}). The racial makeup of the village was 91.99% White, 0.23% African American, 0.68% Native American, 0.11% Asian, 0.23% from other races, and 6.77% from two or more races. Hispanic or Latino of any race were 3.72% of the population.

There were 451 households, out of which 41.9% had children under the age of 18 living with them, 51.22% were married couples living together, 13.30% had a female householder with no husband present, and 31.71% were non-families. 23.50% of all households were made up of individuals, and 14.41% had someone living alone who was 65 years of age or older. The average household size was 3.17 and the average family size was 2.72.

The village's age distribution consisted of 31.4% under the age of 18, 6.8% from 18 to 24, 29.1% from 25 to 44, 20.4% from 45 to 64, and 12.2% who were 65 years of age or older. The median age was 37.3 years. For every 100 females, there were 94.8 males. For every 100 females age 18 and over, there were 89.6 males.

The median income for a household in the village was $47,454, and the median income for a family was $53,889. Males had a median income of $37,500 versus $25,438 for females. The per capita income for the village was $22,490. About 14.6% of families and 18.5% of the population were below the poverty line, including 28.6% of those under age 18 and 1.3% of those age 65 or over.

== Education ==
It is in the Bureau Valley Community Unit School District 340.

== Notable people ==
- Mary L. Moreland (1859–1918), minister, evangelist, suffragist, author
- Darwin Teilhet, mystery novelist and screenwriter; born in Wyanet
