= La Moille, Illinois =

- Village
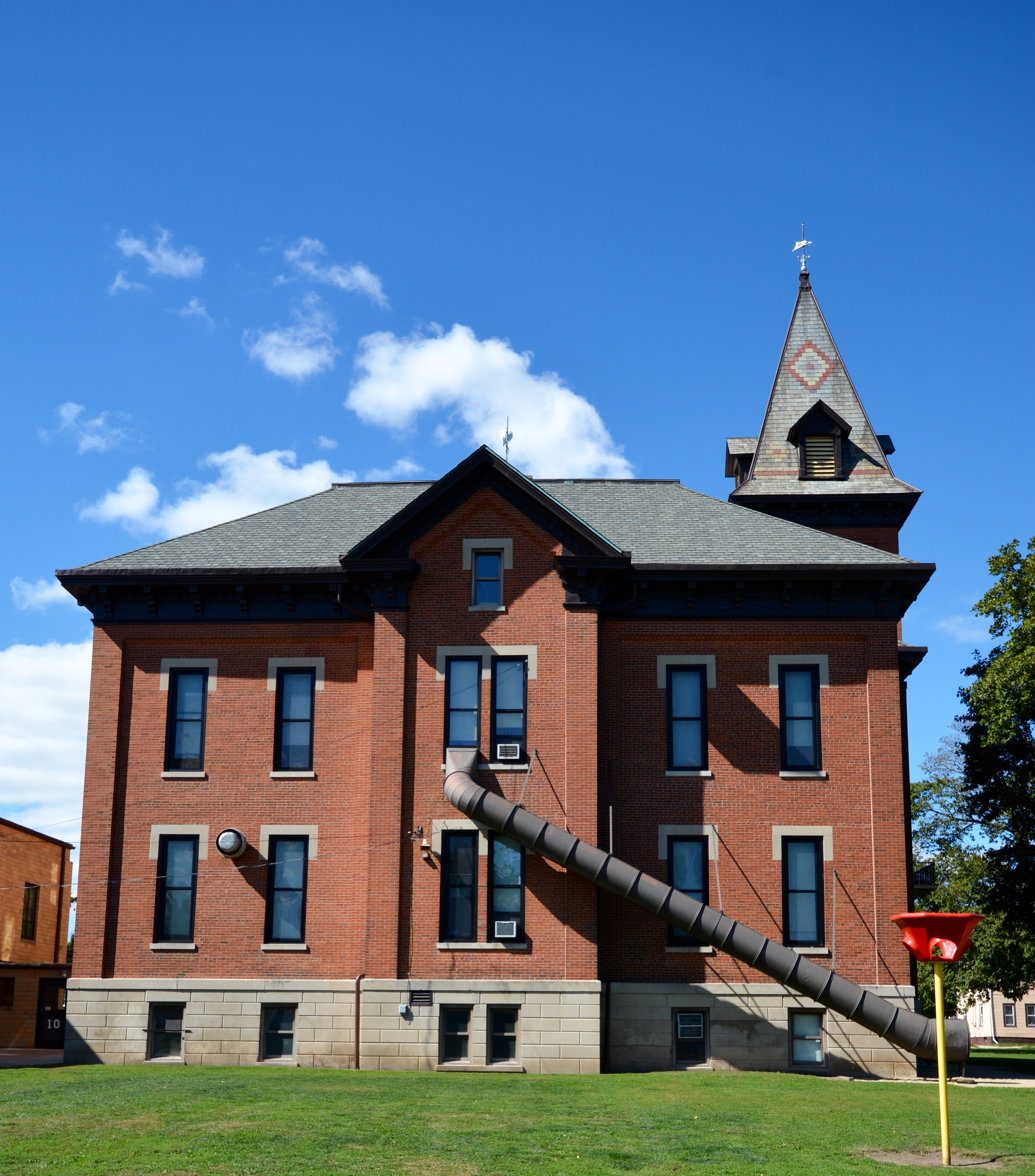
- Historic school in La Moille

- Location of La Moille in Bureau County, Illinois.
- Coordinates: 41°31′49″N 89°17′04″W
- Country: United States
- State: Illinois
- County: Bureau
- Townships: Lamoille, Clarion

Area
  - Total: 1.16 sq mi (3.0 km^{2})
  - Land: 1.16 sq mi (3.0 km^{2})
  - Water: 0.00 sq mi (0 km^{2})
- Elevation: 801 ft (244 m)

Population (2020)
  - Total: 679
  - Density: 585/sq mi (226/km^{2})
- Time zone: UTC-6 (CST)
  - Summer (DST): UTC-5 (CDT)
- ZIP code: 61330
- Area code: 815
- FIPS code: 17-41794
- GNIS feature ID: 2398367

La Moille is a village in Bureau County, Illinois, United States. The population was 679 at the 2020 census. It is part of the Ottawa Micropolitan Statistical Area.

La Moille was named after the Lamoille River valley, in Vermont.

== History ==
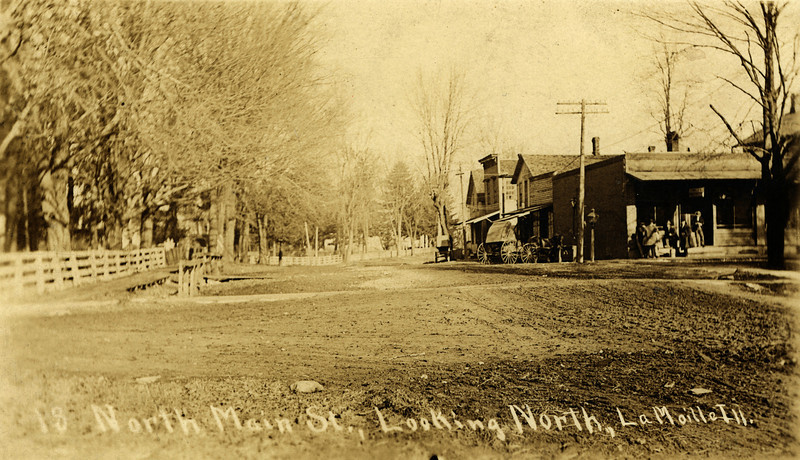
Downtown La Moille in 1900

La Moille was first settled in 1830 by Daniel Dimmick, who went on to found Dimmick, Illinois after the Blackhawk War. The village was originally named Greenfield when platted, but was soon after changed to La Moille. In 1870, an extension of the Chicago, Burlington, and Quincy Railroad began passenger and freight service between Mendota, IL and Fulton, IL.

By 1877, the town was home to a hotel, several churches, more than a dozen stores, a grain elevator, doctors, and a one room schoolhouse. These businesses made up a downtown area of three blocks. The Allen School was built in 1887 to alleviate overcrowding brought on by the increasing population and consolidation of public schools. A fire on May 19, 1916, destroyed much of the northern portion of the downtown area.

== Geography ==
According to the 2021 census gazetteer files, La Moille has a total area of 1.16 square miles (3.00 km^{2}), all land.

The village is at the junction of State Highway 92 and U.S. Route 34, as well as State Highway 89 and U.S. Route 34.

Pike Creek, a tributary to Big Bureau Creek, flows south through the town.

== Demographics ==
Historical population
Census	Pop.	Note	%±
1880	488		—
1890	516		5.7%
1900	576		11.6%
1910	555		−3.6%
1920	547		−1.4%
1930	504		−7.9%
1940	509		1.0%
1950	505		−0.8%
1960	655		29.7%
1970	669		2.1%
1980	734		9.7%
1990	654		−10.9%
2000	773		18.2%
2010	726		−6.1%
2020	679		−6.5%
U.S. Decennial Census

As of the 2020 census there were 679 people, 297 households, and 206 families residing in the village. The population density was 587.37 inhabitants per square mile (226.78/km^{2}). There were 313 housing units at an average density of 270.76 per square mile (104.54/km^{2}). The racial makeup of the village was 93.67% White, 0.15% Asian, 0.44% from other races, and 5.74% from two or more races. Hispanic or Latino of any race were 5.89% of the population.

There were 297 households, out of which 32.0% had children under the age of 18 living with them, 61.28% were married couples living together, 5.72% had a female householder with no husband present, and 30.64% were non-families. 24.92% of all households were made up of individuals, and 11.45% had someone living alone who was 65 years of age or older. The average household size was 3.30 and the average family size was 2.70.

The village's age distribution consisted of 23.0% under the age of 18, 13.0% from 18 to 24, 20.2% from 25 to 44, 27% from 45 to 64, and 16.7% who were 65 years of age or older. The median age was 37.3 years. For every 100 females, there were 103.3 males. For every 100 females age 18 and over, there were 115.0 males.

The median income for a household in the village was $60,288, and the median income for a family was $63,125. Males had a median income of $31,726 versus $26,310 for females. The per capita income for the village was $28,568. About 1.5% of families and 3.7% of the population were below the poverty line, including 4.9% of those under age 18 and 8.2% of those age 65 or over.

== Gallery ==
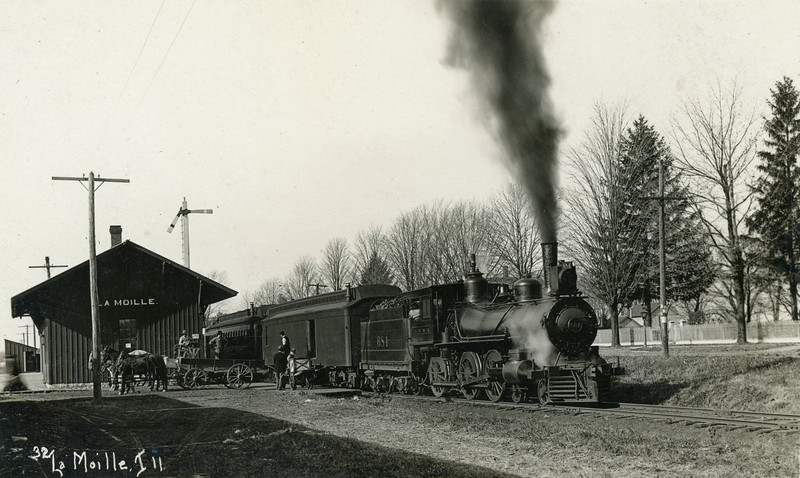
La Moille CB&Q Depot ca. 1920

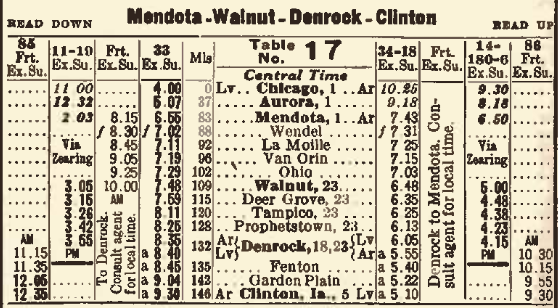
1923 CB&Q timetable showing a stop at La Moille
