= Illinois Route 89 =

State highway in central Illinois, US

Illinois Route 89
- IL 89 highlighted in red

Route information
- Maintained by IDOT
- Length: 55.48 mi (89.29 km)
- Existed: 1924–present

Major junctions
- South end: IL 116 in Metamora
- US 6 / IL 29 in Spring Valley; I-80 in Spring Valley
- North end: US 34 in LaMoille

Location
- Country: United States
- State: Illinois
- Counties: Woodford, Marshall, Putnam, Bureau

Highway system
- Illinois State Highway System; Interstate; US; State; Tollways; Scenic
← IL 88	→ I-90

Illinois Route 89 (IL 89) is a 55.48-mile-long (89.29 km) rural, north–south state highway in central Illinois. It runs from U.S. Route 34 (US 34) in La Moille southward to IL 116 in Metamora. IL 26 and IL 89 are the main north–south roads between Interstate 39 (I-39)/US 51 and IL 29.

== Route description ==
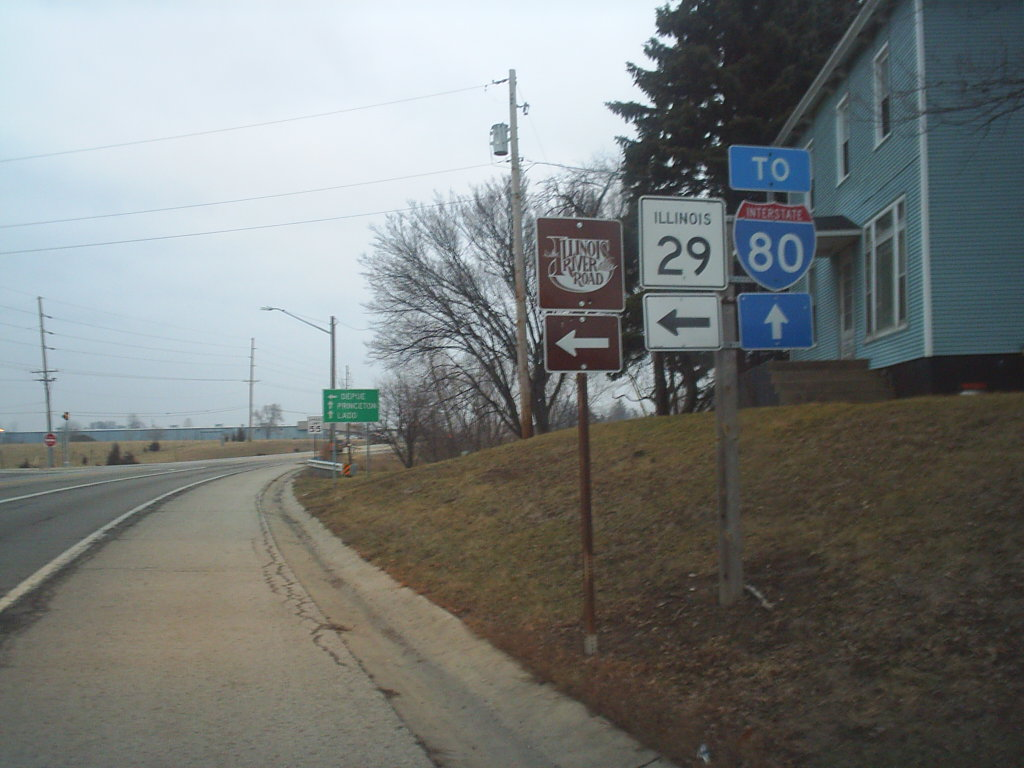
IL 89 at its junction with IL 29

Starting at La Moille, IL 89 travels south and passes through the small towns of Arlington, Cherry, and Ladd, where it crosses I-80. After passing Spring Valley and crossing the Illinois River, IL 89 crosses IL 71 near Granville, then passes through McNabb. After crossing IL 18 in Magnolia and IL 17 at Varna, it then passes through LaRose and Washburn as only state highway in those two towns. It becomes North Niles Street in Metamora and ends at Mount Vernon Street, IL 116.

== History ==
SBI Route 89 originally ran from Dixon to Metamora along Illinois Route 26 and Illinois 71. It was truncated north at Granville in 1938 and rerouted to La Moille.

The highway's crossing of the Illinois River in Spring Valley was replaced with a new bridge that opened on June 18, 2018. The former bridge was imploded.

== Major intersections ==
County	Location	mi	km	Destinations	Notes
Woodford	Metamora	0.0	0.0	IL 116 (Mt. Vernon Street)	Southern terminus
Marshall		18.7	30.1	IL 17 – Lacon, Wenona	
Putnam		25.2	40.6	IL 18 – Henry, Streator	
Putnam		35.0	56.3	IL 71 – Ottawa, Hennepin	
Bureau	Spring Valley	39.8	64.1	US 6 east (Dakota Street)	Southern end of IL 89 and US 6 overlap
Bureau	Spring Valley	41.0	66.0	IL 29 west	Eastern terminus of IL 29
Bureau	Spring Valley	43.1	69.4	US 6 west – Princeton	Northern end of IL 89 and US 6 overlap
Bureau		43.3	69.7	I-80 – Moline, Rock Island, Joliet	Exit 70 (Interstate 80); diamond interchange
Bureau		55.48	89.29	US 34	Northern terminus
1.000 mi = 1.609 km; 1.000 km = 0.621 mi: Concurrency terminus
