= Walnut, Illinois =

- Village
- Location of Walnut in Bureau County, Illinois.
- Coordinates: 41°33′25″N 89°35′29″W
- Country: United States
- State: Illinois
- County: Bureau
- Township: Walnut

Area
  - Total: 0.801 sq mi (2.07 km^{2})
  - Land: 0.801 sq mi (2.07 km^{2})
  - Water: 0.00 sq mi (0 km^{2})
- Elevation: 709 ft (216 m)

Population (2020)
  - Total: 1,311
  - Density: 1,640/sq mi (632/km^{2})
- Time zone: UTC-6 (CST)
  - Summer (DST): UTC-5 (CDT)
- ZIP code: 61376
- Area code: 815
- FIPS code: 17-78526
- GNIS feature ID: 2400087
- Website: www.villageofwalnut.org

Walnut is a village in Bureau County, Illinois, United States. The population was 1,311 at the 2020 census, down from 1,416 at the 2010 census and 1,461 at the 2000 census. It is part of the Ottawa Micropolitan Statistical Area. The village was incorporated on October 26, 1876.

== Geography ==
According to the 2021 census gazetteer files, Walnut has a total area of 0.80 square miles (2.07 km^{2}), all land.

=== Climate ===
Climate data for Walnut, Illinois (1991–2020 normals, extremes 1893–present)
Month	Jan	Feb	Mar	Apr	May	Jun	Jul	Aug	Sep	Oct	Nov	Dec	Year
Record high °F (°C)	65 (18)	70 (21)	87 (31)	94 (34)	105 (41)	106 (41)	111 (44)	105 (41)	103 (39)	98 (37)	81 (27)	70 (21)	111 (44)
Mean daily maximum °F (°C)	29.3 (−1.5)	33.9 (1.1)	46.9 (8.3)	60.5 (15.8)	71.7 (22.1)	80.6 (27.0)	83.3 (28.5)	81.5 (27.5)	76.0 (24.4)	63.2 (17.3)	47.7 (8.7)	35.0 (1.7)	59.1 (15.1)
Daily mean °F (°C)	21.1 (−6.1)	25.4 (−3.7)	37.5 (3.1)	49.5 (9.7)	61.1 (16.2)	70.5 (21.4)	73.4 (23.0)	71.3 (21.8)	64.4 (18.0)	52.1 (11.2)	38.7 (3.7)	27.1 (−2.7)	49.3 (9.6)
Mean daily minimum °F (°C)	12.9 (−10.6)	17.0 (−8.3)	28.0 (−2.2)	38.6 (3.7)	50.6 (10.3)	60.3 (15.7)	63.4 (17.4)	61.1 (16.2)	52.9 (11.6)	41.0 (5.0)	29.7 (−1.3)	19.1 (−7.2)	39.5 (4.2)
Record low °F (°C)	−27 (−33)	−26 (−32)	−13 (−25)	6 (−14)	24 (−4)	37 (3)	44 (7)	37 (3)	22 (−6)	10 (−12)	−8 (−22)	−23 (−31)	−27 (−33)
Average precipitation inches (mm)	1.52 (39)	1.73 (44)	2.22 (56)	3.35 (85)	4.63 (118)	4.93 (125)	3.94 (100)	3.83 (97)	3.40 (86)	2.97 (75)	2.33 (59)	1.99 (51)	36.84 (936)
Average snowfall inches (cm)	12.7 (32)	8.4 (21)	4.7 (12)	0.6 (1.5)	0.0 (0.0)	0.0 (0.0)	0.0 (0.0)	0.0 (0.0)	0.0 (0.0)	0.2 (0.51)	2.0 (5.1)	7.3 (19)	35.9 (91)
Average precipitation days (≥ 0.01 in)	6.3	5.4	6.7	8.2	9.5	8.3	6.8	7.0	6.1	6.5	5.8	6.1	82.7
Average snowy days (≥ 0.1 in)	4.6	3.0	1.8	0.4	0.0	0.0	0.0	0.0	0.0	0.1	0.7	3.1	13.7
Source: NOAA

== Demographics ==
Historical population
Census	Pop.	Note	%±
1880	515		—
1890	605		17.5%
1900	791		30.7%
1910	763		−3.5%
1920	771		1.0%
1930	833		8.0%
1940	961		15.4%
1950	1,093		13.7%
1960	1,192		9.1%
1970	1,295		8.6%
1980	1,513		16.8%
1990	1,463		−3.3%
2000	1,461		−0.1%
2010	1,416		−3.1%
2020	1,311		−7.4%
U.S. Decennial Census

=== 2020 census ===
As of the 2020 census, Walnut had a population of 1,311.

The median age was 40.5 years. 24.3% of residents were under the age of 18 and 21.4% of residents were 65 years of age or older. For every 100 females there were 90.6 males, and for every 100 females age 18 and over there were 89.1 males age 18 and over.

There were 524 households and 362 families residing in the village. Of all households, 30.5% had children under the age of 18 living in them, 50.4% were married-couple households, 17.2% were households with a male householder and no spouse or partner present, and 26.5% were households with a female householder and no spouse or partner present. About 31.3% of all households were made up of individuals, and 16.4% had someone living alone who was 65 years of age or older.

The population density was 1,636.70 inhabitants per square mile (631.93/km^{2}). There were 578 housing units at an average density of 721.60 per square mile (278.61/km^{2}). Of the housing units, 9.3% were vacant. The homeowner vacancy rate was 2.1% and the rental vacancy rate was 5.5%.

0.0% of residents lived in urban areas, while 100.0% lived in rural areas.

Racial composition as of the 2020 census
Race	Number	Percent
White	1,265	96.5%
Black or African American	2	0.2%
American Indian and Alaska Native	0	0.0%
Asian	2	0.2%
Native Hawaiian and Other Pacific Islander	0	0.0%
Some other race	2	0.2%
Two or more races	40	3.1%
Hispanic or Latino (of any race)	34	2.6%

=== Income and poverty ===
The median income for a household in the village was $48,382, and the median income for a family was $69,605. Males had a median income of $39,833 versus $21,420 for females. The per capita income for the village was $25,790. About 7.2% of families and 8.7% of the population were below the poverty line, including 7.8% of those under age 18 and 3.2% of those age 65 or over.

== Education ==
It is in the Bureau Valley Community Unit School District 340.

Besides the local public schools, Christ Lutheran School, located in nearby Sterling, serves students of various religious backgrounds from Walnut to Milledgeville and from Morrison to Dixon. As part of the largest network of Protestant schools in the US, CLS provides an education for students from age 3 through 8th grade that is focused on all of the core academic subjects.

== Notable people ==
- Dan Kolb, pitcher for five Major League Baseball teams; graduated from Walnut High School
- Don Marquis, author of Archy and Mehitabel; born in Walnut
