= Ottawa micropolitan area, Illinois =

Coordinates: 41°21′12″N 88°49′51″W

- Micropolitan Statistical Area
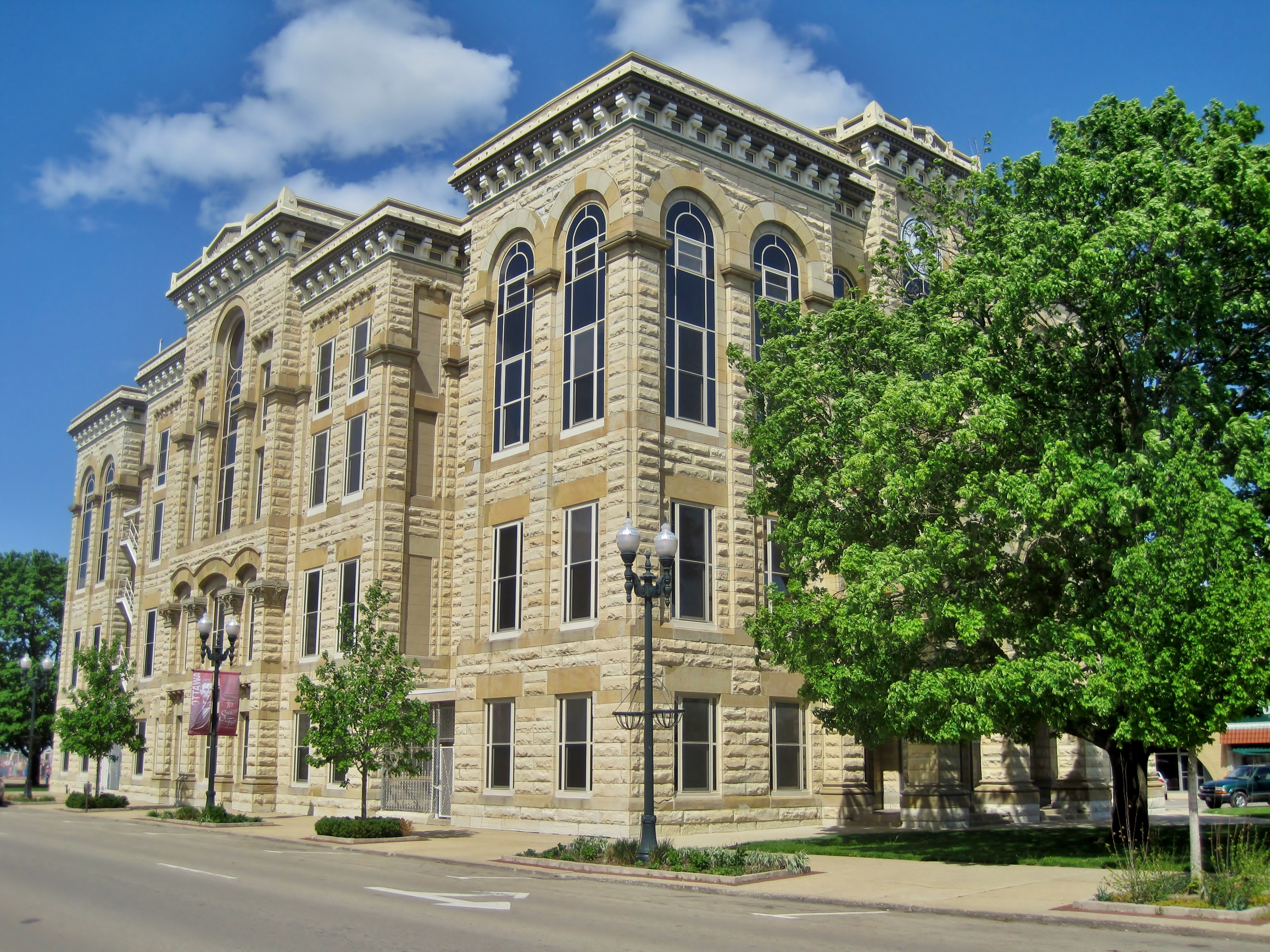
- LaSalle County Courthouse in Ottawa
Interactive Map of Ottawa, IL μSA
City of Ottawa
Ottawa, IL μSA
Other Counties in the Chicago, IL–IN–WI CSA
- Country: United States
- State: Illinois
- Principal city: Ottawa
- Other city: Streator
- Time zone: UTC−6 (CST)
  - Summer (DST): UTC−5 (CDT)

The Ottawa, Illinois, micropolitan area, as defined by the United States Census Bureau, is an area consisting of three counties in Northern Illinois, anchored by the city of Ottawa. Peru (until 2020) and Streator (until 2013) are former primary cities.

As of the 2010 census, the μSA had a population of 154,908. An estimate by the Census Bureau, as of July 1, 2012, placed the population at 153,182, a decrease of 1.11%, but still making it the fourth-largest micropolitan statistical area in the United States.

== Counties ==
- Bureau
- LaSalle (Note: Some parts of this county are also considered by some groups to be part of the Chicago metropolitan area.)
- Putnam

== Communities ==
=== Places with more than 10,000 inhabitants ===
- Ottawa (Principal city)
- Streator (partial)

=== Places with 5,000 to 10,000 inhabitants ===
- LaSalle
- Mendota
- Princeton
- Peru
- Spring Valley

=== Places with 1,000 to 5,000 inhabitants ===
- DePue
- Earlville
- Granville
- Ladd
- Marseilles
- Oglesby
- Seneca (partial)
- Sheridan
- Walnut
- Wenona (partial)
- Wyanet

=== Places with 500 to 1,000 inhabitants ===
- Buda
- Cherry
- Dalzell
- Grand Ridge
- Hennepin
- La Moille
- Leland
- Naplate
- Neponset
- North Utica
- Ohio
- Sheffield
- Tiskilwa
- Tonica

=== Places with less than 500 inhabitants ===
- Arlington
- Bureau Junction
- Cedar Point
- Cherry
- Dana
- Dover
- Hollowayville
- Kangley
- Leonore
- Lostant
- Magnolia
- Malden
- Manlius
- Mark
- McNabb
- Millington (partial)
- Mineral
- New Bedford
- Ransom
- Rutland
- Seatonville
- Somonauk (partial)
- Standard
- Troy Grove

=== Unincorporated places ===
- Altmar
- Baker
- Blakes
- Burnett
- Clarion
- Coal Hollow
- Danway
- Dayton
- Dimmick
- Farm Ridge
- Fitchmoor
- Florid
- Garfield
- Harding
- Hitt
- Jonesville
- Kasbeer
- Kernan
- Lake Holiday
- Leeds
- Limerick
- Lone Tree Corners
- Lowell
- Marquette
- Meriden
- Milla
- Milo
- Mount Palatine
- Normandy
- Northville
- Norway
- Ottville
- Peterstown
- Piety Hill
- Prairie Center
- Providence
- Putnam
- Richards
- Rockwell
- Science
- Serena
- Stavanger
- Stoneyville
- Sulphur Springs
- Thomas
- Ticona
- Tomahawk Bluff
- Triumph
- Van Orin
- Vermilionville
- Walnut Grove
- Waltham
- Webster Park
- Wedron
- Whitefield (partial)
- Wilsman
- Woodland Addition
- Yorktown
- Zearing

== Townships ==
=== Bureau County ===
- Arispie Township
- Berlin Township
- Bureau Township
- Clarion Township
- Concord Township
- Dover Township
- Fairfield Township
- Gold Township
- Greenville Township
- Hall Township
- Indiantown Township
- Lamoille Township
- Leepertown Township
- Macon Township
- Manlius Township
- Milo Township
- Mineral Township
- Neponset Township
- Ohio Township
- Princeton Township
- Selby Township
- Walnut Township
- Westfield Township
- Wheatland Township
- Wyanet Township

=== LaSalle County ===
- Adams Township
- Allen Township
- Brookfield Township
- Bruce Township
- Dayton Township
- Deer Park Township
- Dimmick Township
- Eagle Township
- Earl Township
- Eden Township
- Fall River Township
- Farm Ridge Township
- Freedom Township
- Grand Rapids Township
- Groveland Township
- Hope Township
- LaSalle Township
- Manlius Township
- Mendota Township
- Meriden Township
- Miller Township
- Mission Township
- Northville Township
- Ophir Township
- Osage Township
- Ottawa Township
- Otter Creek Township
- Peru Township
- Richland Township
- Rutland Township
- Serena Township
- South Ottawa Township
- Troy Grove Township
- Utica Township
- Vermillion Township
- Wallace Township
- Waltham Township

=== Putnam County ===
- Granville Township
- Hennepin Township
- Magnolia Township
- Senachwine Township

== Demographics ==
As of the census of 2000, there were 153,098 people, 60,014 households, and 41,459 families residing within the Micropolitan Area. The racial makeup of the Area was 95.50% White, 1.23% African American, 0.18% Native American, 0.52% Asian, 0.02% Pacific Islander, 1.57% from other races, and 0.99% from two or more races. Hispanic or Latino of any race were 5.01% of the population.

The median income for a household in the Ottawa Micropolitan area was $42,011, and the median income for a family was $49,576. Males had a median income of $38,628 versus $21,706 for females. The per capita income for the area was $19,506.

== See also ==
- Illinois statistical areas
