= Illinois's 14th congressional district =

U.S. House district for Illinois

- Interactive map of district boundaries since January 3, 2023
- Representative: Lauren Underwood; D–Naperville
- Area: 1,999.6 mi^{2} (5,179 km^{2})
- Distribution: 89.9% urban; 10.1% rural
- Population (2025): 782,433
- Median household income: $98,319
- Ethnicity: 58.8% White; 22.8% Hispanic; 9.3% Black; 5.2% Asian; 3.4% Two or more races; 0.4% other
- Cook PVI: D+3

The 14th congressional district of Illinois is currently represented by Democrat Lauren Underwood. It is located in northern Illinois, surrounding the outer northern and western suburbs of Chicago.

Joseph Gurney Cannon, who also served as Speaker of the United States House of Representatives during four congresses and after whom the Cannon House Office Building is named, represented the district early in his career (1873–83), although he was representing the 18th district when he was speaker from 1903 to 1911.

The 14th district was represented from 1987 to 2007 by Republican Dennis Hastert, who served as Speaker of the House during the 106th through 109th Congresses.

Hastert resigned from Congress in November 2007 and on March 8, 2008, the 2008 Illinois's 14th congressional district special election was held to fill the vacancy. Democrat Bill Foster defeated Republican Jim Oberweis by 52.5% to 47.5%. In the November 2008 regular election, Foster won a full two-year term, defeating Oberweis once again. Foster failed to win re-election in 2010. Republican Randy Hultgren won the seat for the GOP and was sworn in when the 112th Congress convened. Hultgren was re-elected in the 2012 election, the 2014 election, and the 2016 election. In the 2018 election, Democratic nominee Lauren Underwood defeated Hultgren, 52.5 to 47.5 percent, thus flipping the Cook Partisan Voting Index Republican +5 district to the Democratic Party.

== Composition ==
For the 118th and successive Congresses (based on redistricting following the 2020 census), the district contains all or portions of the following counties, townships, and municipalities:

Bureau County (17)

Arlington, Berlin Township, Bureau Junction, Cherry, Dalzell, DePue, Dover (part, also 16th), Hall Township, Hollowayville, Ladd, Leepertown Township (part, also 16th), Malden, Mark, Seatonville, Selby Township, Spring Valley, Westfield Township

DeKalb County (25)

Afton Township, Clinton Township, Cortland, Cortland Township, Lee (part, also 16th; shared with Lee County), DeKalb, DeKalb Township, Hinckley, Malta, Malta Township, Maple Park (part, shard with Kane County), Milan Township, Paw Paw Township, Pierce Township, Sandwich (part, shared with Kendall County), Sandwich Township, Shabonna, Shabonna Township, Somonauk (part, shared with LaSalle County), Somonauk Township, Squaw Grove Township, Sycamore, Sycamore Township (part, also 11th), Victor Township, Waterman

Kane County (6)

Aurora (part, also 11th; shared with DuPage, Kendall, and Will counties), Big Rock, Big Rock Township, North Aurora (part, also 11th), Sugar Grove (part, also 11th), Sugar Grove Township

Kendall County (23)

All 23 townships and municipalities

LaSalle County (42)

Adams Township, Cedar Point, Dayton Township, Deer Park Township (part, also 16th), Dimmick Township, Earl Township, Earlville, Eden Township (part, also 16th), Farm Ridge Township (part, also 16th), Freedom Township, LaSalle, LaSalle Township, Leland, Manlius Township, Marseilles (part, also 16th), Mendota, Mendota Township, Meriden Township, Miller Township, Millington (part, shared with Kendall County), Mission Township, Naplate, North Utica, Northville Township, Oglesby, Ophir Township, Ottawa, Ottawa Township, Peru, Peru Township, Rutland Township, Seneca (part, also 16th), Serena Township, Sheridan, Somonauk (part, shared with DeKalb County), South Ottawa Township, Tonica (part, also 16th), Troy Grove, Troy Grove Township, Utica Township, Wallace Township, Waltham Township

Putnam County (5)

Granville, Granville Township, Hennepin (part, also 16th; shared with Bureau County), Hennepin Township (part, also 16th), Standard

Will County (17)

Bolingbrook (part, also 11th), Crest Hill, Lemont (part, also 11th; shared with Cook County), Elwood (part, also 1st), Jackson Township, Joliet (part, also 1st), Joliet Township, Lockport (part, also 1st), Lockport Township (part, also 1st; includes Fairmount), Naperville (part, also 11th), Plainfield (part, shared with Kendall County), Plainfield Township, Rockdale, Romeoville (part, also 11th), Shorewood, Troy Township (part, also 1st), Wheatland Township

== History ==
=== 2011 redistricting ===
After the 2011 redistricting which followed the 2010 census, meaning from the 2012 election on, the congressional district covers parts of the counties of DeKalb, DuPage, Kane, Kendall, Lake, McHenry and Will. The district includes all or parts of the cities of Aurora, Batavia, Campton Hills, Crystal Lake, Geneva, Huntley, McHenry, Naperville, St. Charles, North Aurora, Oswego, Plainfield, Plano, Sycamore, Warrenville, Wauconda, Woodstock, and Yorkville.

== Recent election results from statewide races ==
Year	Office	Results
2008	President	Obama 58% - 40%
2012	President	Obama 54% - 46%
2016	President	Clinton 51% - 42%
2016	Senate	Duckworth 51% - 42%
2016	Comptroller (Spec.)	Munger 46.9% - 46.7%
2018	Governor	Pritzker 51% - 42%
2018	Attorney General	Raoul 52% - 45%
2018	Secretary of State	White 66% - 32%
2018	Comptroller	Mendoza 56% - 40%
2018	Treasurer	Frerichs 53% - 43%
2020	President	Biden 55% - 43%
2020	Senate	Durbin 53% - 41%
2022	Senate	Duckworth 54% - 44%
2022	Governor	Pritzker 52% - 45%
2022	Attorney General	Raoul 52% - 45%
2022	Secretary of State	Giannoulias 52% - 46%
2022	Comptroller	Mendoza 55% - 43%
2022	Treasurer	Frerichs 51% - 47%
2024	President	Harris 51% - 46%

== List of members representing the district ==
Member	Party	Years	Cong ress	Electoral history	Location
District created March 4, 1873
Joseph G. Cannon (Danville)	Republican	March 4, 1873 – March 3, 1883	43rd 44th 45th 46th 47th	Elected in 1872. Re-elected in 1874. Re-elected in 1876. Re-elected in 1878. Re-elected in 1880. Redistricted to the 15th district.	1873 – 1883 [data missing]
Jonathan H. Rowell (Bloomington)	Republican	March 4, 1883 – March 3, 1891	48th 49th 50th 51st	Elected in 1882. Re-elected in 1884. Re-elected in 1886. Re-elected in 1888. Lost re-election.	1873 – 1883 [data missing]
Owen Scott (Bloomington)	Democratic	March 4, 1891 – March 3, 1893	52nd	Elected in 1890. Lost re-election.	1873 – 1883 [data missing]
Benjamin F. Funk (Bloomington)	Republican	March 4, 1893 – March 3, 1895	53rd	Elected in 1892. Retired.	1893 – 1901 Included Putnam, Marshall, Peoria, Tazewell and Mason counties.
Joseph V. Graff (Peoria)	Republican	March 4, 1895 – March 3, 1903	54th 55th 56th 57th	Elected in 1894. Re-elected in 1896. Re-elected in 1898. Re-elected in 1900. Redistricted to the 16th district.	1893 – 1901 Included Putnam, Marshall, Peoria, Tazewell and Mason counties.
Joseph V. Graff (Peoria)	Republican	March 4, 1895 – March 3, 1903	54th 55th 56th 57th	Elected in 1894. Re-elected in 1896. Re-elected in 1898. Re-elected in 1900. Redistricted to the 16th district.	1901 – 1947 Included Rock Island, Mercer, Warren, Henderson, Hancock and Mc Donough counties.
Benjamin F. Marsh (Warsaw)	Republican	March 4, 1903 – June 2, 1905	58th 59th	Elected in 1902. Re-elected in 1904. Died.	1901 – 1947 Included Rock Island, Mercer, Warren, Henderson, Hancock and Mc Donough counties.
Vacant		June 2, 1905 – November 7, 1905	59th		1901 – 1947 Included Rock Island, Mercer, Warren, Henderson, Hancock and Mc Donough counties.
James McKinney (Aledo)	Republican	November 7, 1905 – March 3, 1913	59th 60th 61st 62nd	Elected to finish Marsh's term. Re-elected in 1906. Re-elected in 1908. Re-elected in 1910. Retired.	1901 – 1947 Included Rock Island, Mercer, Warren, Henderson, Hancock and Mc Donough counties.
Clyde H. Tavenner (Cordova)	Democratic	March 4, 1913 – March 3, 1917	63rd 64th	Elected in 1912. Re-elected in 1914. Lost re-election.	1901 – 1947 Included Rock Island, Mercer, Warren, Henderson, Hancock and Mc Donough counties.
William J. Graham (Aledo)	Republican	March 4, 1917 – June 7, 1924	65th 66th 67th 68th	Elected in 1916. Re-elected in 1918. Re-elected in 1920. Re-elected in 1922. Resigned when appointed presiding judge of the U.S. Court of Appeals.	1901 – 1947 Included Rock Island, Mercer, Warren, Henderson, Hancock and Mc Donough counties.
Vacant		June 7, 1924 – March 3, 1925	68th		1901 – 1947 Included Rock Island, Mercer, Warren, Henderson, Hancock and Mc Donough counties.
John C. Allen (Monmouth)	Republican	March 4, 1925 – March 3, 1933	69th 70th 71st 72nd	Elected in 1924. Re-elected in 1926. Re-elected in 1928. Re-elected in 1930. Lost re-election.	1901 – 1947 Included Rock Island, Mercer, Warren, Henderson, Hancock and Mc Donough counties.
Chester C. Thompson (Rock Island)	Democratic	March 4, 1933 – January 3, 1939	73rd 74th 75th	Elected in 1932. Re-elected in 1934. Re-elected in 1936. Lost re-election.	1901 – 1947 Included Rock Island, Mercer, Warren, Henderson, Hancock and Mc Donough counties.
Anton J. Johnson (Macomb)	Republican	January 3, 1939 – January 3, 1949	76th 77th 78th 79th 80th	Elected in 1938. Re-elected in 1940. Re-elected in 1942. Re-elected in 1944. Re-elected in 1946. Redistricted to the 20th district and retired there.	1901 – 1947 Included Rock Island, Mercer, Warren, Henderson, Hancock and Mc Donough counties.
Anton J. Johnson (Macomb)	Republican	January 3, 1939 – January 3, 1949	76th 77th 78th 79th 80th	Elected in 1938. Re-elected in 1940. Re-elected in 1942. Re-elected in 1944. Re-elected in 1946. Redistricted to the 20th district and retired there.	1947 – 1961 Included Kane, DuPage and McHenry counties.
Chauncey W. Reed (West Chicago)	Republican	January 3, 1949 – February 9, 1956	81st 82nd 83rd 84th	Elected in 1948. Re-elected in 1950. Re-elected in 1952. Re-elected in 1954. Died.	1947 – 1961 Included Kane, DuPage and McHenry counties.
Vacant		February 9, 1956 – January 3, 1957	84th		1947 – 1961 Included Kane, DuPage and McHenry counties.
Russell W. Keeney (Wheaton)	Republican	January 3, 1957 – January 11, 1958	85th	Elected in 1956. Died.	1947 – 1961 Included Kane, DuPage and McHenry counties.
Vacant		January 11, 1958 – January 3, 1959	85th		1947 – 1961 Included Kane, DuPage and McHenry counties.
Elmer J. Hoffman (Wheaton)	Republican	January 3, 1959 – January 3, 1965	86th 87th 88th	Elected in 1958. Re-elected in 1960. Re-elected in 1962. Retired.	1947 – 1961 Included Kane, DuPage and McHenry counties.
Elmer J. Hoffman (Wheaton)	Republican	January 3, 1959 – January 3, 1965	86th 87th 88th	Elected in 1958. Re-elected in 1960. Re-elected in 1962. Retired.	1961 – 1963 [data missing]
Elmer J. Hoffman (Wheaton)	Republican	January 3, 1959 – January 3, 1965	86th 87th 88th	Elected in 1958. Re-elected in 1960. Re-elected in 1962. Retired.	1963 – 1973 [data missing]
John N. Erlenborn (Glen Ellyn)	Republican	January 3, 1965 – January 3, 1983	89th 90th 91st 92nd 93rd 94th 95th 96th 97th	Elected in 1964. Re-elected in 1966. Re-elected in 1968. Re-elected in 1970. Re-elected in 1972. Re-elected in 1974. Re-elected in 1976. Re-elected in 1978. Re-elected in 1980. Redistricted to the 13th district.	1963 – 1973 [data missing]
John N. Erlenborn (Glen Ellyn)	Republican	January 3, 1965 – January 3, 1983	89th 90th 91st 92nd 93rd 94th 95th 96th 97th	Elected in 1964. Re-elected in 1966. Re-elected in 1968. Re-elected in 1970. Re-elected in 1972. Re-elected in 1974. Re-elected in 1976. Re-elected in 1978. Re-elected in 1980. Redistricted to the 13th district.	1973 – 1983 [data missing]
Tom Corcoran (Ottawa)	Republican	January 3, 1983 – November 28, 1984	98th	Redistricted from the 15th district and re-elected in 1982. Resigned to run for U.S. Senator.	1983 – 1993 [data missing]
Vacant		November 28, 1984 – January 3, 1985	98th		1983 – 1993 [data missing]
John E. Grotberg (St. Charles)	Republican	January 3, 1985 – November 15, 1986	99th	Elected in 1984. Died.	1983 – 1993 [data missing]
Vacant		November 15, 1986 – January 3, 1987	99th		1983 – 1993 [data missing]
Dennis Hastert (Yorkville)	Republican	January 3, 1987 – November 26, 2007	100th 101st 102nd 103rd 104th 105th 106th 107th 108th 109th 110th	Elected in 1986. Re-elected in 1988. Re-elected in 1990. Re-elected in 1992. Re-elected in 1994. Re-elected in 1996. Re-elected in 1998. Re-elected in 2000. Re-elected in 2002. Re-elected in 2004. Re-elected in 2006. Resigned.	1983 – 1993 [data missing]
Dennis Hastert (Yorkville)	Republican	January 3, 1987 – November 26, 2007	100th 101st 102nd 103rd 104th 105th 106th 107th 108th 109th 110th	Elected in 1986. Re-elected in 1988. Re-elected in 1990. Re-elected in 1992. Re-elected in 1994. Re-elected in 1996. Re-elected in 1998. Re-elected in 2000. Re-elected in 2002. Re-elected in 2004. Re-elected in 2006. Resigned.	1993 – 2003 [data missing]
Dennis Hastert (Yorkville)	Republican	January 3, 1987 – November 26, 2007	100th 101st 102nd 103rd 104th 105th 106th 107th 108th 109th 110th	Elected in 1986. Re-elected in 1988. Re-elected in 1990. Re-elected in 1992. Re-elected in 1994. Re-elected in 1996. Re-elected in 1998. Re-elected in 2000. Re-elected in 2002. Re-elected in 2004. Re-elected in 2006. Resigned.	2003 – 2013
Vacant		November 26, 2007 – March 8, 2008	110th		2003 – 2013
Bill Foster (Geneva)	Democratic	March 8, 2008 – January 3, 2011	110th 111th	Elected to finish Hastert's term. Re-elected in 2008. Lost re-election.	2003 – 2013
Randy Hultgren (Plano)	Republican	January 3, 2011 – January 3, 2019	112th 113th 114th 115th	Elected in 2010. Re-elected in 2012. Re-elected in 2014. Re-elected in 2016. Lost re-election.	2003 – 2013
Randy Hultgren (Plano)	Republican	January 3, 2011 – January 3, 2019	112th 113th 114th 115th	Elected in 2010. Re-elected in 2012. Re-elected in 2014. Re-elected in 2016. Lost re-election.	2013–2023
Lauren Underwood (Naperville)	Democratic	January 3, 2019 – present	116th 117th 118th 119th	Elected in 2018. Re-elected in 2020. Re-elected in 2022. Re-elected in 2024. Re-elected in 2026.	2013–2023
Lauren Underwood (Naperville)	Democratic	January 3, 2019 – present	116th 117th 118th 119th	Elected in 2018. Re-elected in 2020. Re-elected in 2022. Re-elected in 2024. Re-elected in 2026.	2023–present

== Recent election results ==
=== 2012 election ===
Incumbent Randy Hultgren defeated Democratic challenger Dennis Anderson to keep his spot in the House of Representatives.

Illinois's 14th congressional district, 2012
Party	Candidate	Votes	%
Republican	Randy Hultgren (incumbent)	177,603	58.8
Democratic	Dennis Anderson	124,351	41.2
Total votes		301,954	100.0
Republican hold			

=== 2014 election ===
This election was a repeat of the 2012 election, and Hultgren retained his seat.

Illinois's 14th congressional district, 2014
Party	Candidate	Votes	%
Republican	Randy Hultgren (incumbent)	145,369	65.4
Democratic	Dennis Anderson	76,861	34.6
Total votes		222,230	100.0
Republican hold			

=== 2016 election ===
Hultgren wins again, this time against Democrat Jim Walz.

Illinois's 14th congressional district, 2016
Party	Candidate	Votes	%
Republican	Randy Hultgren (incumbent)	200,508	59.3
Democratic	Jim Walz	137,589	40.7
Total votes		338,097	100.0
Republican hold			

=== 2018 election ===
Hultgren lost his reelection bid to Democrat Lauren Underwood.

United States House of Representatives elections in Illinois, 2018
Party	Candidate	Votes	%
Democratic	Lauren Underwood	156,035	52.5
Republican	Randy Hultgren (Incumbent)	141,164	47.5
Total votes		297,199	100.0
Democratic gain from Republican			

=== 2020 election ===
United States House of Representatives elections in Illinois, 2020
Party	Candidate	Votes	%
Democratic	Lauren Underwood (Incumbent)	203,209	50.7
Republican	Jim Oberweis	197,835	49.3
Total votes		401,052	100.0
Democratic hold			

=== 2022 election ===
United States House of Representatives elections in Illinois, 2022
Party	Candidate	Votes	%
Democratic	Lauren Underwood (incumbent)	128,141	54.16
Republican	Scott Gryder	108,451	45.84
Write-in		8	0.00
Total votes		236,600	100.0
Democratic hold			

=== 2024 election ===
United States House of Representatives elections in Illinois, 2024
Party	Candidate	Votes	%	±%
Democratic	Lauren Underwood (incumbent)	183,446	55.10	+0.94
Republican	Jim Marter	149,464	44.89	−0.95%
Write-in		19	0.01	N/A
Total votes		332,929	100.0	
Democratic hold				

== See also ==
- 2008 Illinois's 14th congressional district special election
- Illinois's congressional districts
- List of United States congressional districts

U.S. House of Representatives
Preceded by Georgia's 6th congressional district	Home district of the speaker January 6, 1999 – January 3, 2007	Succeeded by California's 8th congressional district
