= LaSalle-Peru High School =

Coordinates: 41.332528°N 89.104883°W

La Salle-Peru Township High School

Location
- 541 Chartres Street; LaSalle, Illinois 61301; United States

Information
- Type: Public
- Established: 1898
- Locale: District 120
- Superintendent: Dr. Clayton Theisinger
- Principal: Mrs. Ingrid Cushing
- Teaching staff: 87.51 (FTE)
- Grades: 9–12
- Enrollment: 1,191 (2023–2024)
- Student to teacher ratio: 13.61
- Colors: Red and Green
- Song: Red and Green
- Athletics conference: Interstate 8
- Mascot: Cavalier
- Team name: (Lady) Cavaliers
- Website: www.lphs.net

LaSalle-Peru Township High School, also known as LaSalle-Peru High School, LPHS, or simply L-P, is a public four-year high school located at 541 Chartres Street in LaSalle, Illinois, a city in LaSalle County, Illinois, in the Midwestern United States. LPHS serves the communities and surrounding areas of LaSalle, Peru, Oglesby, Tonica, and Dimmick. The campus is located 18 miles west of Ottawa, Illinois. The high school takes students from the following townships: Dimmick, Waltham, Peru, LaSalle, Utica, Deer Park, Eden, Vermillion, Hope, and Richland.

== History ==
LaSalle-Peru Township High School was built in 1897–98, occupying buildings on 5th, 6th and Chartres Streets in LaSalle. The Thomas J. McCormack Library was built in 1920. LaSalle-Peru-Oglesby Junior College was formed at the school in 1924. L-P-O Junior College eventually became Illinois Valley Community College in 1968, and is now located in Oglesby, Illinois. The school's clock tower was built in 1927 and is still in use today. Matthiessen Memorial Auditorium was opened in 1928. Howard Fellows Stadium was opened in 1937. Howard Fellows Stadium was massively renovated in the summer of 1995. There have been many additions throughout the years at L-P High School, including the West Gymnasium, Area Career Center and Dolan Building. In 1952, the LP band director at the time skirted the policies of LaSalle, which, at that point, was a "Sundown town", to have an integrated band. He was trying to coordinate the visit of a Big Ten school, and the university had African American members, and the director accommodated them accordingly. This event is largely considered to have been the beginning of the end of segregation and racism in the Illinois Valley.

== Academics ==
On the 2010 Prairie State Achievement Exam, 49% of L-P High School 11th graders met or exceeded standards in Reading. 45% met or exceeded standards in Mathematics, and 50% met or exceeded standards in Science.

== Athletics ==
L-P's athletic teams are called the Cavaliers. The Cavaliers compete in essentially the same sports as most mid-size high schools in the Midwest.

=== Highlights ===
- The football team took 2nd place in the state in 1977, 1978, and 1979.
- The boys track team placed 3rd place in the state 1921.

In 2000 LP's Drama team placed first in NCIC and sectional and went on to state competition with their performance of Bang Bang You're Dead.

- In 2009, the baseball team placed 4th in the 3A IHSA state competition.
- On October 9, 2009, the LaSalle-Peru Varsity football team beat rival Geneseo 38 to 36 by making a field goal with 3 seconds left on the clock. This marked the first time LaSalle-Peru had beaten Geneseo in Varsity football since 1919.

=== Conference affiliation ===
From 1964 to 2010, the Cavaliers competed in the North Central Illinois Conference (NCIC), in that conference's larger-school division. Significant changes in conference alignments occurred in the 2000s, however, and starting with the 2010–2011 school year, LPHS became a charter member of the Northern Illinois Big 12 Conference. The NIB-12 includes most of the larger schools from the NCIC, as well as many members of a dissolving conference called the Western Sun Conference. After the NIB 12 dissolved in 2018, LPHS joined the Interstate 8 Conference in 2019.

== List of activities ==
- Fall
  - Golf
  - Cross Country
  - Football
  - Girls' Tennis
  - Soccer
  - Volleyball
  - Marching Band
  - Girls' Swimming
- Winter
  - Boys' Bowling
  - Girls' Bowling
  - Boys' Basketball
  - Girls' Basketball
  - Boys' Wrestling
  - Girls' Wrestling
  - Boys' Swimming
- Spring
  - Baseball
  - Softball
  - Boys' Track
  - Girls' Track
  - Bass Fishing
  - Girls' Soccer

=== Year-round ===
- Gym (class)
- Cavalettes
- Cheerleading
- Color Guard / Winter Guard
- Intramurals
- Lp Athletic Boosters
- Ell Ess Pe (Yearbook)
- Impressions
- Art
- Computer Club
- Caval Peers
- Cereal Eating Club
- Chess
- Choir
- Band
- Tech Club
- Drama
- Family, Career, and Community Leaders of America
- Future Business Leaders of America (FBLA)
- FFA
- Fellowship of Christian Athletes
- Foreign Language (Spanish, French, German)
- Green Team
- Group Interpretation
- Key Club
- Lp Student Librarians Program
- Link Crew
- Math
- Peer Club
- Problem Solving and Motivation Team
- Renaissance
- RtI
- Scholastic Bowl
- Science Research Clan
- Student Council
- Tops Drug-Free Youth

== Red and Green ==
The school song is called "Red and Green", named after the school's colors. It is played after every football score and baseball win. Here are the lyrics:

Come all students of LP High, We will shout our cheers to the sky. 'Neath our colors flying on high Loyalty will never die!

Wave our banners of green and red, Brightly flashing high overhead. Always loyal, La Salle-Peru Great our love for you.

School of honor, glory and fame, With true pride we're praising your name. Known throughout the country and state As a school that's truly great.

Everyone is singing your praise, All our voices loudly we raise. Aways upright, noble and true, Hurrah! La Salle-Peru!

Red And Green was written by Susan Jane Hoelle.

== Demographics ==
As of 2010, the ethnic makeup of L-P High School was 85.7% White, 11.4% Hispanic, 2% Black, 0.9% Asian, and 0.2% Native American. 0.5% were said to be at a low English proficiency level. 27.7% were said to be at a low income level.

== Culture ==
=== LP vs. SBA ===
One of the many local rivalries is with local Saint Bede Academy. They compete in most sports except American football . The last game took place in 1985.

=== Yearbook ===
In 2009, LP's yearbook was named one of the 36 USA Yearbooks Of The Year by Jostens.

=== The Marching Cavaliers ===
LaSalle-Peru's marching band was noted for being not only one of the best bands in the state and country, but was also known throughout Europe as well. The Lasalle-Peru Color Guard adds the greatest visual to the band, whilst including rifle, flag, and backgrounds on wheels.

The band has won several awards at competitions, including 1st place in class AA at the Danville Marching Invitational, and 1st place in class AA at the Metamora High School Marching Invitational. Jeremy Stevens, a former member of The Cavaliers Drum and Bugle Corps, is the current band director at LaSalle-Peru Township High School.

== Notable alumni ==
- Edward Elzear "Zez" Confrey, (1895–1971), an American composer and performer of piano music, graduated in 1917(?)
- Mike Goff, (1976–), offensive guard for the Kansas City Chiefs, graduated in 1994
- Richard L. Kolowski, (1961?), Nebraska state senator, 2013 to present
- Joe Rutgens, (1939), former defensive tackle for the Washington Redskins
- Phil Seghi, (March 9, 1909 – January 8, 1987), (1926), an American front-office executive in Major League Baseball, he appointed Frank Robinson as Major League Baseball's first African-American manager
- John Skibinski, (1974), running back for the Chicago Bears, Birmingham Stallions, Jacksonville Bulls and Purdue Boilermakers
- Luke Yaklich, (1976-), head basketball coach, University of Illinois at Chicago
