= Mendota Township High School =

School in Illinois, United States

Location
- 2300 West Main Street; Mendota, Illinois 61342; United States; 41.56733°N 89.13791°W

Information
- Type: Public High School
- School district: Mendota Township School District 280
- Superintendent: Denise Aughenbaugh
- Principal: Joe Masini
- Staff: 36.20 (FTE)
- Grades: 9-12
- Enrollment: 484 (2023-2024)
- Student to teacher ratio: 13.37
- Colors: Purple and Gold
- Athletics conference: Three Rivers Conference
- Mascot: Trojan
- Website: School website

Mendota Township High School is a secondary school located at 2300 W. Main Street, Mendota, Illinois. It currently educates, as of August 2010, 619 students. The school lies within School District No. 280, and MHS is the only school that the district operates. The district superintendent is Denise Aughenbaugh and Joe Masini is the principal.

== History ==
Before Mendota High School existed, there were two high schools in the city of Mendota, East Mendota High School and Blackstone High School. Both were founded in the 1870s. The two united in 1911 and held classes in Blackstone. East Mendota then became Lincoln School. In 1917, a new brick high school was constructed in the northern section of town to accommodate a growing student enrollment, and it went through several additions in later years. That building served the community until 2002, when a new high school was constructed on the northwest side of the city. The new building was constructed because a restroom on the second floor of the 1917 building collapsed onto the floor below it. The current high school is located along U.S. Route 52 near the corner of it and N. 44th Road. From 1929-2011, Mendota was a part of the North Central Illinois Conference (NCIC). In 2011, Mendota joined the Big Northern Conference (BNC) in all sports, except for football. From 2012-2021, Mendota was in the BNC for all sports. As of 2022, Mendota has been a part of the Three Rivers Conference.

== Academics ==
On the 2010 Prairie State Achievement Exam, 58% of Mendota High School 11th graders met or exceeded standards in Reading. 56% met or exceeded standards in Mathematics, and 50% met or exceeded standards in Science.

== Activities ==
MTHS includes many extra-curricular activities. Among these are Band, Choir, Drama, Scholastic Bowl, Academic Challenge, FFA, Math Team, Interact Club, Student Council, Spanish Club, Yearbook Club, Spanish National Honor Society, National Honor Society, and several others.

The band has four annual concerts a year: the Fall Concert, Winter Concert, Symphony Concert, and Graduation Concert.

The Mendota drama department puts on dramatic productions, a play every fall, one every summer, and a musical every other spring.

The fine arts department also has a group of madrigal singers.

=== Sports ===
The school's teams are known at the Mendota Trojans, and compete in the Three Rivers Conference.

==== List of Athletics ====
===== Fall =====
- Golf
- Cross Country
- Football
- Football Cheerleading
- Girls' Tennis
- Boys' Soccer
- Volleyball

===== Winter =====
- Bowling
- Boys' Basketball
- Cheerleading
- Girls' Basketball
- Freshman Girls' Basketball
- Freshman Boys' Basketball
- Wrestling

===== Spring =====
- Freshman Baseball
- Sophomore Baseball
- Varsity Baseball
- Girls' Soccer
- Sophomore Softball
- Varsity Softball
- Boys' Tennis
- Boys' Track
- Girls' Track

== Geography ==
The school district has area in three different counties, nine townships, and over 150 square miles (390 km^{2}).

The eight townships fully or partially within the school district are Mendota Township, LaSalle County, Troy Grove Township, LaSalle County, Meriden Township, LaSalle County, Ophir Township, LaSalle County, Waltham Township, LaSalle County, Westfield Township, Bureau County, Clarion Township, Bureau County, Brooklyn Township, Lee County, Sublette Township, Lee County, and Wyoming Township, Lee County. Though the town of Mendota remains at a stable population, the high school population continues to grow. This is possibly due to the amount of small towns encompassed within the boundaries of the district. Among these are Troy Grove, Triumph, Meriden, Compton, and West Brooklyn.

== Notable alumni ==
- Ruth Emma Mitten (1876-1942), educator, superintendent of schools
- Bill Brown, Professional Football Player
- Ray Jauch, Canadian Football League Hall of Fame Coach
- Jason Pohl, Orange County Choppers
