= LaSalle County, Illinois =

County in Illinois, United States

- County
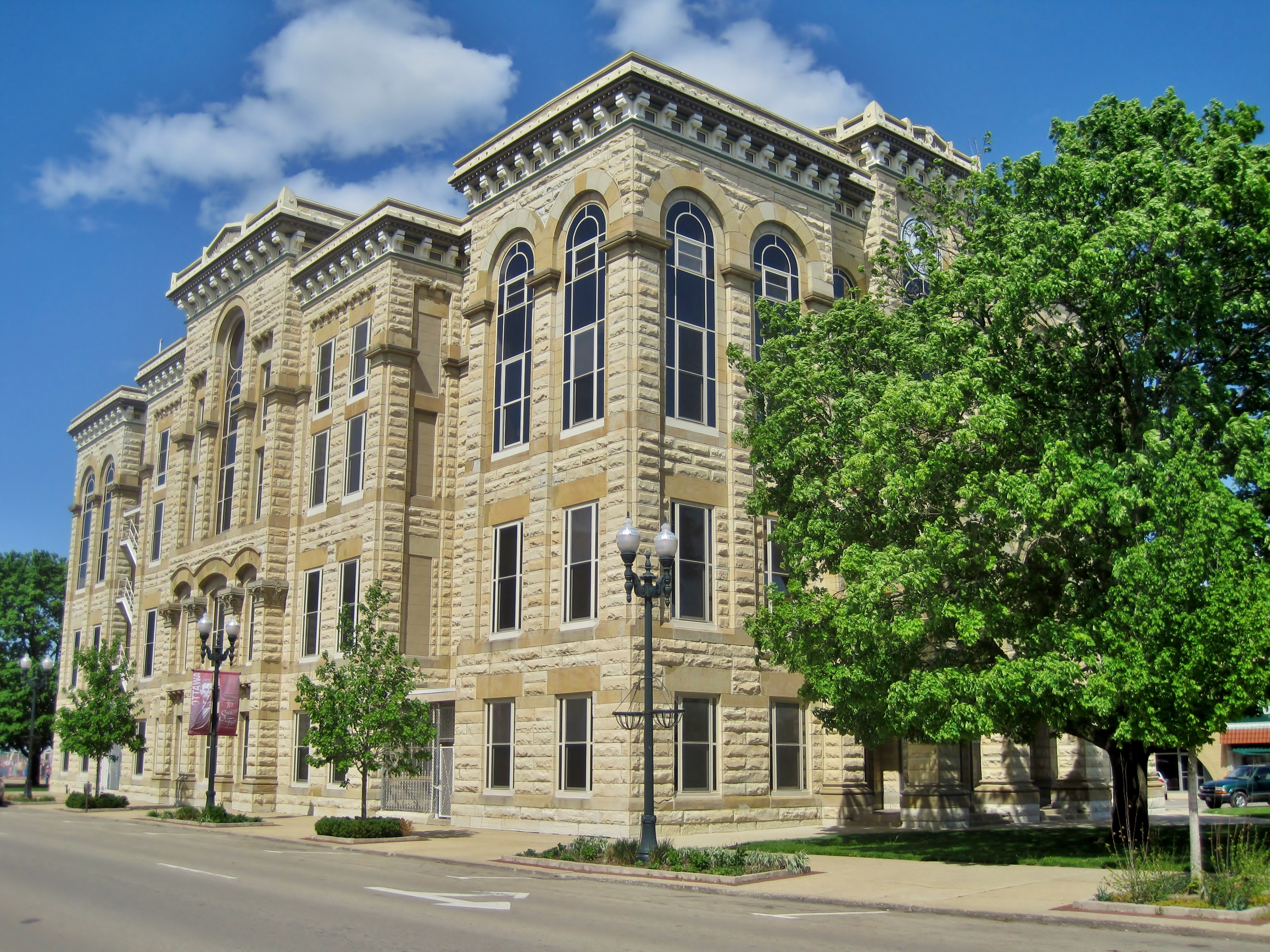
- LaSalle County Courthouse, Ottawa, Illinois

- Location within the U.S. state of Illinois
- Country: United States
- State: Illinois
- Founded: January 15, 1831
- Named for: René-Robert Cavelier, Sieur de La Salle
- Seat: Ottawa
- Largest city: Ottawa

Area
  - Total: 1,148 sq mi (2,970 km^{2})
  - Land: 1,135 sq mi (2,940 km^{2})
  - Water: 13 sq mi (34 km^{2}) 1.1%

Population (2020)
  - Total: 109,658
  - Estimate (2025): 107,773 ▼
  - Density: 96.61/sq mi (37.30/km^{2})
- Time zone: UTC−6 (Central)
  - Summer (DST): UTC−5 (CDT)
- Congressional districts: 14th, 16th
- Website: lasallecountyil.gov

LaSalle County is a county located within the Fox Valley and Illinois River Valley regions of the U.S. state of Illinois. As of the 2020 census, it had a population of 109,658. Its county seat and largest city is Ottawa. LaSalle County is part of the Ottawa, IL Micropolitan Statistical Area of Northern Illinois.

LaSalle County borders Woodford, Marshall, Putnam, Bureau, Livingston, Lee, DeKalb, Kendall, and Grundy counties. Though LaSalle County is in the Chicago media market, it retains a unique identity with a mix of river towns and vast expanses of farmland. The county lies at the intersection of the Chicago, Peoria, Quad Cities and Rockford television markets with all four regions broadcasting within its borders and having a strong influence on the area, despite the county being only 60 miles (97 km) southwest of Chicago.

== History ==
LaSalle County was formed on January 15, 1831, out of Tazewell and Putnam Counties. It is named for the early French explorer René-Robert Cavelier, Sieur de La Salle. La Salle was the first European recorded as entering the area. He traveled the Mississippi River upriver from the Gulf of Mexico, claimed the land for France, or rather as a possession of King Louis XIV, and named it Louisiana. In 1680, he and Henry de Tonty built Fort Crevecoeur on the Illinois River in present-day Tazewell County, and in 1683, they constructed Fort St. Louis on Starved Rock in present-day LaSalle County. By 1857, the county was served by the daily arrivals of two trains of the Illinois Central Railroad.

As William D. Boyce reportedly founded the Boy Scouts of America in Ottawa, the council is named for him. He and two other founders established the BSA, but Boyce is given the sole credit since his faction of the BSA adopted the other two competing factions' elements within the organization. LaSalle County is within what is called the Lowaneu District of the W.D. Boyce Council.

In 1838, William Reddick, a local farmer and landowner, was elected sheriff of LaSalle County. He was hired to restore public order resulting from an influx of workmen creating the Illinois and Michigan Canal. Reddick served as sheriff for four consecutive two-year terms. After being elected to the Illinois State Senate, Reddick commissioned the construction of a luxurious Italianate home, now known as the Reddick Mansion. This structure is one of the largest surviving pre-Civil War homes in Illinois. The mansion was added to the National Register of Historic Places in 1973, as part of the Washington Park Historic District.

The tri-county area of DeKalb, LaSalle, and Kendall has been influential in terms of its politics, sports, multimedia, industry, and technology. DeKalb County was the birthplace of plant hybridization (DeKalb, DeKalb Agricultural), the hot-air hand dryer (Sandwich, Sahara-Pak), and is the home of supermodel Cindy Crawford, at least 7 MLB players, two NFL coaches, and three NFL players. LaSalle County was home to the Westclox Company for many years, it was the site of the first Lincoln-Douglas Debates, and was the home to the discoverer of Pluto, as well as a Wild West figure, multiple published authors, a legendary NCAA athletic director and coach, and multiple political figures. Kendall County is the home to a seminal piece of 20th Century architecture, the birthplace of the Harvester Reaper, (as well as the precursor to the International Harvester Company), the plastic tackle box and plastic-injection molding, and is the home of multiple athletes, politicians, and a former Speaker of the House of Representatives. DeKalb, LaSalle, and Kendall Counties have all been featured in major films, with scripts either having been written by residents or former residents.

LaSalle County was founded largely by immigrants from New England. These were old stock Yankee immigrants, who were descended from the English Puritans who settled New England in the 1600s. The completion of the Erie Canal caused a surge in New England immigration to what was then the Northwest Territory. The end of the Black Hawk War led to an additional surge of immigration, once again coming almost exclusively from the six New England states as a result of overpopulation combined with land shortages in that region. Some of these later settlers were from upstate New York and had parents who had moved to that region from New England shortly after the Revolutionary War. New Englanders and New England transplants from upstate New York were the vast majority of LaSalle County's inhabitants during the first several decades of its history. These settlers were primarily members of the Congregational Church, though due to the Second Great Awakening, many of them had converted to Methodism, and some had become Baptists before coming to what is now LaSalle County. The Congregational Church has subsequently gone through many divisions, and some factions, including those in LaSalle County, are now known as the Church of Christ and the United Church of Christ. As a result of this heritage, the vast majority of inhabitants in LaSalle County − much like antebellum New England − were overwhelmingly in favor of the abolitionist movement during the decades leading up to the Civil War. When the New Englanders arrived in what is now LaSalle County, there was nothing but dense virgin forest and wild prairie. They laid out farms, constructed roads, erected government buildings and established post routes. In 1834, Norwegian immigrants settled in the northwest corner of the county. The construction of the Illinois & Michigan Canal brought thousands of Irish and Irish-American workers to Illinois. Many settled in the counties along the canal route. Ottawa and LaSalle County had a large Irish population due to the importance of Ottawa as a trade and industrial center on the canal. The election of the LaSalle County sheriff hinged on the Irish vote when a New Englander Woodruff was replaced as sheriff by William Reddick a successful Irish landowner following Woodruff's role in putting down a riot along the canal in 1837. Irish and German immigration to LaSalle County, especially LaSalle. Ottawa and Peru prior to the Civil War was such that many German immigrants joined Illinois regiments during the war. In the late 1880s and early 1890s, Irish and German migrants began moving into LaSalle County; most of these later immigrants did not move directly from Ireland and Germany, but rather from other areas in the Midwest where they had been living, particularly the state of Ohio. Immigrants around the Peterstown, Troy Grove, Meriden, Mendota, and Earlville area were largely of German descent, with the Mendota area directly being the epicenter of the German community in the county. Norwegian population has been strong in the area around Northville, Serena, Mission, and Miller Townships in LaSalle County, along with Little Rock and Fox Townships in Kendall County, and Sandwich and Somonauk Townships in DeKalb County. One such family, the Borschsenius family, runs the Norway Store in the unincorporated community of Norway, in southern Mission Township, and the family has been deeply involved with businesses and the school district of nearby Serena and Sheridan.

Ottawa was the first site of the famous Lincoln–Douglas debates on August 21, 1858. The community has a strong association with the 16th President, and elements of the downtown area of the city retain much mid-19th century architecture. People in LaSalle County were predominantly abolitionist in attitude, and many Underground Railroad sites were maintained in the county prior to the American Civil War.

Utica (officially North Utica) is considered the gateway to the Starved Rock area. Visiting three parks provides a full experience of the area. Starved Rock State Park, (south of Utica on Illinois Route 178), is the crown jewel. Matthiessen State Park (south of Starved Rock on Ill 178) has many of the same features of Starved Rock, but is smaller, and faces the Vermilion River to the west. Buffalo Rock State Park (east of Utica, and west of Naplate/Ottawa on Dee Bennett Road) has an enclosure which features American bison, as well as the mound sculpture complex, known as the Effigy Tumuli. The village was the site of a F3 tornado that ripped through the downtown and killed nine people on April 20, 2004.

On November 15, 2023, a magnitude 3.6 earthquake hit the county.

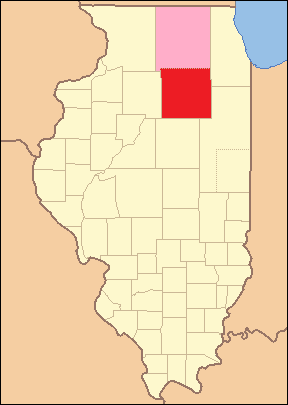
LaSalle County from the time of its creation to 1836, including a large tract of unorganized territory temporarily attached to it.

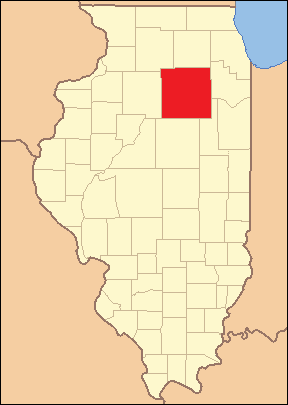
LaSalle County between 1836 and 1837

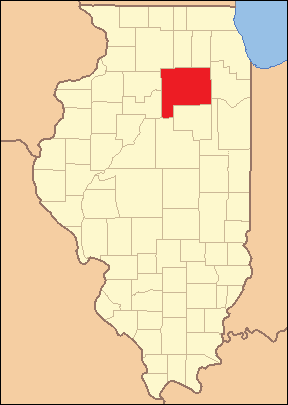
LaSalle County between 1837 and 1841

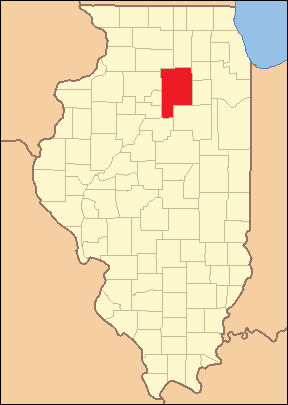
LaSalle County between 1841 and 1843

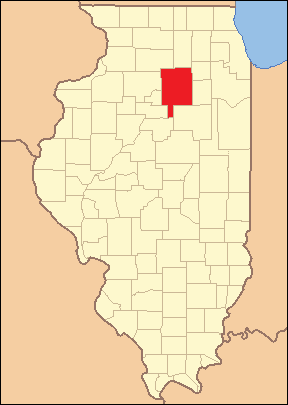
In 1843, the southwest corner was ceded to Marshall County, reducing LaSalle to its present size

== Geography ==
According to the U.S. Census Bureau, the county has a total area of 1,148 square miles (2,970 km^{2}), of which 1,135 square miles (2,940 km^{2}) is land and 13 square miles (34 km^{2}) (1.1%) is water. It is the second-largest county in Illinois by land area and the fourth-largest by total area.

=== Adjacent counties ===
- Lee County – northwest
- DeKalb County – north
- Kendall County – northeast
- Grundy County – east
- Livingston County – southeast
- Woodford County – south
- Marshall County – southwest
- Putnam County – west
- Bureau County – west

LaSalle County, Illinois, is one of the few counties in the United States to border as many as nine counties. Illinois has two such counties, with Pike County being the other.

Many of the residents of LaSalle County live in cities and towns along the Illinois River. It is the main population core, with some exceptions, including Streator to the south of the county. Large cities along the river include Ottawa, LaSalle, Peru, and Marseilles. The regions north and south of the Illinois River are mostly agricultural, including the Fox River portion of the county, and have few large towns.

=== Climate ===
Ottawa, Illinois

Climate chart (precipitation, max. and min. temperature)
J	F	M	A	M	J	J	A	S	O	N	D
1.5 30 12	1.3 37 18	2.6 49 29	3.4 62 39	4 73 50	4.1 82 59	3.6 85 63	3.8 83 61	3.5 77 53	2.6 65 41	3 49 30	2.3 36 18
- █ Average max. and min. temperatures in °F
- █ Precipitation totals in inches
- Source: The Weather Channel
Metric conversion
J	F	M	A	M	J	J	A	S	O	N	D
37 −1 −11	34 3 −8	66 9 −2	87 17 4	102 23 10	105 28 15	92 29 17	96 28 16	89 25 12	66 18 5	75 9 −1	58 2 −8
- █ Average max. and min. temperatures in °C
- █ Precipitation totals in mm

In recent years, average temperatures in the county seat of Ottawa have ranged from a low of 12 °F (−11 °C) in January to a high of 85 °F (29 °C) in July, although a record low of −25 °F (−32 °C) was recorded in January 1985 and a record high of 112 °F (44 °C) was recorded in July 1936. Average monthly precipitation ranged from 1.32 inches (34 mm) in February to 4.13 inches (105 mm) in June.

== Demographics ==
Historical population
Census	Pop.	Note	%±
1840	9,348		—
1850	17,815		90.6%
1860	48,332		171.3%
1870	60,792		25.8%
1880	70,403		15.8%
1890	80,798		14.8%
1900	87,776		8.6%
1910	90,132		2.7%
1920	92,925		3.1%
1930	97,695		5.1%
1940	97,801		0.1%
1950	100,610		2.9%
1960	110,800		10.1%
1970	111,409		0.5%
1980	112,033		0.6%
1990	106,913		−4.6%
2000	111,509		4.3%
2010	113,924		2.2%
2020	109,658		−3.7%
2025 (est.)	107,773	▼	−1.7%
U.S. Decennial Census

=== 2020 census ===
As of the 2020 census, the county had a population of 109,658 in 45,203 households, and 29,344 families resided in the county.

The median age was 42.5 years, with 21.1% of residents under the age of 18 and 19.7% aged 65 or older. For every 100 females there were 101.8 males, and for every 100 females age 18 and over there were 101.0 males age 18 and over.

The racial makeup of the county was 85.6% White, 2.4% Black or African American, 0.4% American Indian and Alaska Native, 0.8% Asian, <0.1% Native Hawaiian and Pacific Islander, 3.6% from some other race, and 7.2% from two or more races. Hispanic or Latino residents of any race comprised 10.4% of the population.

68.4% of residents lived in urban areas, while 31.6% lived in rural areas.

Of the 45,203 households in the county, 27.0% had children under the age of 18 living in them, 46.5% were married-couple households, 20.1% were households with a male householder and no spouse or partner present, and 25.6% were households with a female householder and no spouse or partner present. About 30.9% of all households were made up of individuals and 14.0% had someone living alone who was 65 years of age or older.

There were 49,812 housing units, of which 9.3% were vacant. Among occupied housing units, 72.8% were owner-occupied and 27.2% were renter-occupied. The homeowner vacancy rate was 1.9% and the rental vacancy rate was 9.0%.

=== 2010 census ===
As of the 2010 census, the population density was 95.5 inhabitants per square mile (36.9/km^{2}). There were 49,812 housing units at an average density of 43.4 per square mile (16.8/km^{2}).

According to the 2006–2010 American Community Survey five-year estimates, the median income for a household in the county was $60,069 and the median income for a family was $72,583. Males had a median income of $50,214 versus $26,424 for females. The per capita income for the county was $31,020. About 9.7% of families and 13.6% of the population were below the poverty line, including 21.8% of those under age 18 and 5.2% of those age 65 or over.

=== 2000 census ===
The 2000 census age pyramid for LaSalle County is shown below.

2000 census age pyramid for LaSalle County

== Education ==
=== Secondary schools ===
==== Public ====
- Earlville High School (CUSD 9), also has district area in DeKalb and Lee counties
- LaSalle-Peru High School, LaSalle
- Leland High School, Leland, also has district area in DeKalb County
- Mendota Township High School, Mendota, also has district area in Bureau and Lee Counties
- Newark Community High School, located within Kendall County, but serves Mission Township
- Ottawa Township High School, Ottawa
- Sandwich Community High School (CUSD 430), located within DeKalb County, but serves Northville Township
- Seneca High School, also has district area in Grundy County
- Serena High School (CUSD 2)
- Somonauk High School, located within DeKalb County, but serves Northville and Adams Townships
- Streator Township High School, Streator
- Woodland High School, Streator

==== Private ====
- Marquette Academy, Ottawa
- Ottawa Christian Academy, Ottawa
- St. Bede Academy, Peru

=== Colleges and universities ===
- Illinois Valley Community College, Oglesby

== Infrastructure ==
=== Transit ===
- Amtrak (Illinois Zephyr, Carl Sandburg, and Southwest Chief)
- Burlington Trailways
- Mendota station

==== Airports ====
- Earlville Airport, closed in 2010
- Illinois Valley Regional Airport, Peru

==== Major highways ====
- I-39
- I-80
- US 6
- US 34
- US 51
- US 52
- IL 17
- IL 18
- IL 23
- IL 71
- IL 170
- IL 178
- IL 251 – former US 51
- IL 351

=== Utilities ===
- LaSalle County Nuclear Generating Station, Marseilles

== Communities ==
=== Cities ===
- Earlville
- La Salle
- Marseilles
- Mendota
- Oglesby
- Ottawa
- Peru
- Sandwich (part)
- Streator (part)
- Wenona (part)

=== Villages ===
- Cedar Point
- Dalzell (part)
- Dana
- Grand Ridge
- Kangley
- Leland
- Leonore
- Lostant
- Millington (part)
- Naplate
- North Utica
- Ransom
- Rutland
- Seneca (part)
- Sheridan
- Somonauk (part)
- Tonica
- Troy Grove

=== Census-designated places ===
- Dayton
- Harding
- Lake Holiday
- Serena
- Triumph
- Wedron

=== Other unincorporated communities ===
- Altmar
- Baker
- Blakes
- Danway
- Dimmick
- Farm Ridge
- Fitchmoor
- Garfield
- Harding
- Jonesville
- Kernan
- Leeds
- Lowell
- Meriden
- Milla
- Mount Palatine (part)
- Northville
- Norway
- Peterstown
- Prairie Center
- Richards
- Science
- Serena
- Stavanger
- Sulphur Springs
- Ticona
- Triumph
- Waltham
- Wedron
- Welland (part)
- Wilsman

=== Townships ===
LaSalle County is divided into thirty-seven townships:

- Adams
- Allen
- Brookfield
- Bruce
- Dayton
- Deer Park
- Dimmick
- Eagle
- Earl
- Eden
- Fall River
- Farm Ridge
- Freedom
- Grand Rapids
- Groveland
- Hope
- LaSalle
- Manlius
- Mendota
- Meriden
- Miller
- Mission
- Northville
- Ophir
- Osage
- Ottawa
- Otter Creek
- Peru
- Richland
- Rutland
- Serena
- South Ottawa
- Troy Grove
- Utica
- Vermillion
- Wallace
- Waltham

=== Ghost towns ===
- East Wenona
- Little Rock
- Science

== Politics ==
LaSalle County, Illinois
Position	Person	Party
Auditor	Stephanie Jo Thompson	Republican
County Board Chairman	Donald E. Jensen	Republican
County Board Majority	20-9	Republican
Circuit Clerk	Greg Vacarro	Republican
County Clerk	Jennifer Ebner	Republican
Coroner	Rich Ploch	Democratic
Recorder	Karen Friestad Miller	Republican
Sheriff	Adam Diss	Republican
State's Attorney	Joe Navarro	Democratic
Regional Superintendent	Chris Dvorak	Democratic
Treasurer	James L. Spelich	Republican

LaSalle has generally been a Republican-leaning swing county, more competitive than most in urbanized Northern Illinois.

In its early years, LaSalle County supported the Democratic Party, being southwest of the Free Soil strongholds in the far northeast of the state. Following the formation of the Republican party, LaSalle County voted for that party in every election until 1884, when it supported Democrat Grover Cleveland three consecutive times. Although the county gave a plurality to Woodrow Wilson in 1912 and supported Franklin D. Roosevelt in his first three elections, it otherwise voted Republican until 1960.

A Democratic trend, typical of Yankee Northern Illinois, saw Michael Dukakis carry LaSalle despite failing to win the election in 1988, and no Republican would carry the county again until George W. Bush in 2004.

United States presidential election results for LaSalle County, Illinois
Year	Republican		Democratic		Third party(ies)	
Year	No.	%	No.	%	No.	%
1892	7,957	44.12%	9,365	51.93%	711	3.94%
1896	11,548	57.60%	8,108	40.44%	391	1.95%
1900	11,781	56.22%	8,671	41.38%	504	2.41%
1904	11,967	62.67%	5,628	29.47%	1,500	7.86%
1908	11,159	55.59%	7,589	37.81%	1,326	6.61%
1912	4,858	24.56%	7,036	35.56%	7,890	39.88%
1916	20,662	56.62%	14,625	40.08%	1,203	3.30%
1920	23,751	73.23%	6,626	20.43%	2,057	6.34%
1924	21,417	60.47%	6,216	17.55%	7,784	21.98%
1928	24,039	53.15%	20,807	46.00%	382	0.84%
1932	19,179	40.30%	27,500	57.79%	908	1.91%
1936	22,240	43.44%	26,926	52.59%	2,035	3.97%
1940	25,296	45.66%	29,704	53.62%	399	0.72%
1944	28,179	54.32%	21,489	41.42%	2,210	4.26%
1948	24,453	55.02%	19,666	44.25%	321	0.72%
1952	32,857	60.54%	21,321	39.28%	99	0.18%
1956	33,461	64.52%	18,318	35.32%	83	0.16%
1960	27,552	49.98%	27,532	49.94%	41	0.07%
1964	21,216	40.69%	30,923	59.31%	0	0.00%
1968	26,054	50.48%	22,940	44.45%	2,616	5.07%
1972	31,190	59.20%	21,405	40.63%	92	0.17%
1976	25,114	51.39%	23,105	47.28%	646	1.32%
1980	27,323	57.12%	16,818	35.16%	3,694	7.72%
1984	27,388	56.89%	20,532	42.65%	219	0.45%
1988	22,166	49.64%	22,271	49.88%	213	0.48%
1992	16,078	32.20%	23,276	46.62%	10,577	21.18%
1996	15,299	36.01%	21,643	50.94%	5,549	13.06%
2000	21,276	46.25%	23,355	50.76%	1,376	2.99%
2004	26,101	51.45%	24,263	47.83%	365	0.72%
2008	21,872	43.47%	27,443	54.55%	995	1.98%
2012	23,256	49.06%	23,073	48.67%	1,076	2.27%
2016	26,689	53.65%	19,543	39.29%	3,511	7.06%
2020	30,113	56.09%	22,442	41.80%	1,132	2.11%
2024	30,717	58.30%	21,029	39.91%	942	1.79%

== Law enforcement ==
Law enforcement in LaSalle County is primarily provided by the LaSalle County Sheriff’s Office, which operates the county jail, patrols unincorporated areas, provides courthouse security, and manages civil process.

== Visitor attractions ==
- Hegeler Carus Mansion
- Hopalong Cassidy River Trail
- Illini State Park
- Kaskaskia Alliance Trail
- LaSalle Lake State Fish and Wildlife Area
- Matthiessen State Park
- Middle East Conflicts Wall Memorial
- Mitchell's Grove Nature Preserve
- Ottawa Avenue Cemetery
- Plum Island Eagle Sanctuary
- Starved Rock State Park
- Washington Park Historic District (Ottawa, Illinois)
- Wild Bill Hickok Memorial

== Notable people ==
- James T. Aubrey (LaSalle) longtime president of CBS Television network
- Bill Brown, (Mendota) former running back for the Minnesota Vikings
- Herbert "Fritz" Crisler, (Earlville, Mendota) head football coach at the University of Michigan (1938–1947), namesake of the school's basketball stadium, and is credited for created the helmet design for the Michigan football team
- Doug Dieken, (rural Streator) former tackle with the Cleveland Browns (1971–1984); color commentary for Browns radio broadcasts
- Walter T. Gunn, Illinois Supreme Court justice, born in LaSalle County
- J. A. Happ, (Peru) pitcher for New York Yankees; pitched for 2008 World Series champion Philadelphia Phillies
- Michael Hermosillo, (Ottawa) outfielder for the Los Angeles Angels and minor league affiliates
- Wild Bill Hickok, (Troy Grove) noted historical Western Figure
- Helen Hokinson, (Mendota) cartoonist for The New Yorker
- Silas Johnson, (Sheridan) credited as the last pitcher to strike out Herman "Babe" Ruth; played for the Cincinnati Reds
- Harry Kelly, (Ottawa) 39th governor of Michigan
- Terrence Malick, (Ottawa) film director, known for Badlands and The Thin Red Line; born in Ottawa
- Bob McGrath, (Ottawa), Sesame Street performer
- Esther Hobart Morris, (Peru) First Female Judge in United States
- Clarence E. Mulford, (Streator) wrote the "Hopalong Cassidy" cowboy novels
- Cleng Peerson, established the community of Norway
- Edward H. Plumb, (Streator) film composer, worked with Walt Disney on Fantasia; nominated four times for an Academy Award
- Maud Powell, (Peru) violinist
- Thomas E. G. Ransom, Civil War general, lived in Peru, namesake of Ransom
- Adam Shabala, (Streator) former outfielder for the San Francisco Giants
- Aaron Shea, (Ottawa) player for the Cleveland Browns
- Clyde Tombaugh, (Streator) astronomer, discovered Pluto
- Martin R. M. Wallace, (Ottawa) Civil War general
- W.H.L. Wallace, (Ottawa) Civil War general
- Walt Willey, (Ottawa) actor, known for All My Children
- Gary K. Wolf, (Earlville) author of Who Censored Roger Rabbit?, adopted into the movie Who Framed Roger Rabbit
- Clay Zavada, (Streator) pitcher for the Arizona Diamondbacks

== See also ==
- National Register of Historic Places listings in LaSalle County, Illinois
- Sandwich Fault Zone
