= Welland (disambiguation) =

Welland is a city in Ontario, Canada.

Welland may also refer to:

== Places ==
- Welland (electoral district), named after the city in Canada
  - Welland South, provincial electoral district
- Welland, Illinois, United States
- Welland (Kettering BC Ward), Northamptonshire
- Welland, South Australia, a suburb of Adelaide in Australia
- Welland, Washington, an unincorporated community in the United States
- Welland, Worcestershire, a village in England
- Welland Estate, Cambridgeshire, England
- River Welland in the east of England
- Welland River in Ontario, Canada, named after its English counterpart
- Welland Canal, named after the Canadian river

== People with the surname ==
- Colin Welland (1934–2015), British actor
- Mark Welland (born 1955), British physicist, head of the Nanoscience Centre at Cambridge University
- Michael Welland (1946-2017), British petroleum geologist
- Roy Welland (born 1962), American bridge player

== Other ==
- The Rolls-Royce Welland, an early turbojet named after the English river
- Welland House Hotel, former building in St. Catharines, Ontario, Canada
- Welland Mills, flour mill in Thorold, Ontario
