= Wallace Township =

Wallace Township may refer to the following townships in the United States:

- Wallace Township, LaSalle County, Illinois
- Wallace Township, Ontario
- Wallace Township, Pennsylvania
