= Altmar, Illinois =

- Unincorporated community
- Location within Illinois Location within the United States
- Coordinates: 41°08′31″N 88°53′33″W
- Country: United States
- State: Illinois
- County: LaSalle
- Township: Eagle
- Elevation: 640 ft (200 m)
- Time zone: UTC-6 (Central (CST))
  - Summer (DST): UTC-5 (CDT)
- Zip: 61304
- Area codes: 815 & 779
- GNIS feature ID: 422404

Altmar is an unincorporated community in Eagle Township, LaSalle County, Illinois, United States. Altmar is located along the Norfolk Southern Railway, 1 mile (1.6 km) west of Kangley.

The community may be named after Altmar, New York.
