= Ticona, Illinois =

- Unincorporated community
- Location within Illinois Location within the United States
- Coordinates: 41°13′27″N 89°03′09″W
- Country: United States
- State: Illinois
- County: LaSalle
- Township: Eden
- Elevation: 646 ft (197 m)
- Time zone: UTC-6 (Central (CST))
  - Summer (DST): UTC-5 (CDT)
- ZIP code: 61370
- Area codes: 815 & 779
- GNIS feature ID: 423241

Ticona is an unincorporated community in Eden Township, LaSalle County, Illinois, United States. Ticona is located at the junction of East 550th Road and North 2101st Road, approximately 1 mile (1.6 km) northeast of Tonica. Ticona shares a ZIP code with Tonica. Ticona was a stop on the Burlington Railroad's Illinois Valley and Northern line between LaSalle and Streator. The railroad constructed a depot, stock yards, water tank, and small grain elevator. The Columbia Hotel of Streator built a small dancing pavilion and beer garden called Columbia Park in the woods near the depot. During a large party, a violent storm hit with lightning killing a man and destroying the park. Also noted for an amateur hypnotist accidentally sending a family to sleep in 1902.
