= Fall River Township, LaSalle County, Illinois =

Coordinates: 41°18′37″N 88°46′20″W

Fall River Township
- Township
- Location in LaSalle County

- LaSalle County's location in Illinois
- Country: United States
- State: Illinois
- County: LaSalle
- Established: Unknown

Area
  - Total: 20.80 sq mi (53.9 km^{2})
  - Land: 20.19 sq mi (52.3 km^{2})
  - Water: 0.61 sq mi (1.6 km^{2}) 2.93%

Population (2020)
  - Total: 802
  - Density: 39.7/sq mi (15.3/km^{2})
- Time zone: UTC-6 (CST)
  - Summer (DST): UTC-5 (CDT)
- FIPS code: 17-099-25284

Fall River Township is located in LaSalle County, Illinois. As of the 2020 census, its population was 802 and it contained 357 housing units. Fall River Township was formed from Grand Rapids Township on an unknown date.

== Geography ==
According to the 2021 census gazetteer files, Fall River Township has a total area of 20.80 square miles (53.87 km^{2}), of which 20.19 square miles (52.29 km^{2}) (or 97.07%) is land and 0.61 square miles (1.58 km^{2}) (or 2.93%) is water.

== Demographics ==
As of the 2020 census there were 802 people, 281 households, and 216 families residing in the township. The population density was 38.56 inhabitants per square mile (14.89/km^{2}). There were 357 housing units at an average density of 17.17 per square mile (6.63/km^{2}). The racial makeup of the township was 92.02% White, 0.62% African American, 0.12% Native American, 0.62% Asian, 0.00% Pacific Islander, 0.62% from other races, and 5.99% from two or more races. Hispanic or Latino of any race were 2.87% of the population.

There were 281 households, out of which 14.60% had children under the age of 18 living with them, 71.53% were married couples living together, 2.49% had a female householder with no spouse present, and 23.13% were non-families. 20.30% of all households were made up of individuals, and 13.20% had someone living alone who was 65 years of age or older. The average household size was 2.30 and the average family size was 2.52.

The township's age distribution consisted of 13.0% under the age of 18, 7.0% from 18 to 24, 8.6% from 25 to 44, 45.7% from 45 to 64, and 25.7% who were 65 years of age or older. The median age was 54.8 years. For every 100 females, there were 130.4 males. For every 100 females age 18 and over, there were 134.7 males.

The median income for a household in the township was $91,719, and the median income for a family was $98,929. Males had a median income of $51,058 versus $25,977 for females. The per capita income for the township was $46,113. About 1.9% of families and 7.1% of the population were below the poverty line, including 12.0% of those under age 18 and none of those age 65 or over.

Historical population
Census	Pop.	Note	%±
2010	763		—
2020	802		5.1%
U.S. Decennial Census
