= Kangley, Illinois =

Village in the United States

- Village
- Location in LaSalle County, Illinois
- Coordinates: 41°08′57″N 88°52′28″W
- Country: United States
- State: Illinois
- County: LaSalle
- Township: Eagle

Area
  - Total: 0.26 sq mi (0.68 km^{2})
  - Land: 0.26 sq mi (0.68 km^{2})
  - Water: 0 sq mi (0.00 km^{2})
- Elevation: 633 ft (193 m)

Population (2020)
  - Total: 235
  - Density: 901.1/sq mi (347.93/km^{2})
- Time zone: UTC-6 (CST)
  - Summer (DST): UTC-5 (CDT)
- ZIP code: 61364
- Area code: 815
- FIPS code: 17-38921
- GNIS feature ID: 2398326

Kangley is a village in LaSalle County, Illinois, United States. The population was 235 at the 2020 census, down from 251 at the 2010 census. It is part of the Ottawa Micropolitan Statistical Area. It is a part of the geographic region known as Streatorland.

== Geography ==
Kangley occupies a bluff on the west side of the Vermilion River, which flows northwest to the Illinois River at LaSalle. It is 3 miles (5 km) northwest of the city of Streator.

According to the 2010 census, Kangley has a total area of 0.26 square miles (0.67 km^{2}), all land.

== Demographics ==
Historical population
Census	Pop.	Note	%±
1890	934		—
1900	1,004		7.5%
1910	380		−62.2%
1920	261		−31.3%
1930	236		−9.6%
1940	239		1.3%
1950	296		23.8%
1960	267		−9.8%
1970	290		8.6%
1980	280		−3.4%
1990	250		−10.7%
2000	287		14.8%
2010	251		−12.5%
2020	235		−6.4%
U.S. Decennial Census

As of the 2020 census there were 235 people, 120 households, and 79 families residing in the village. The population density was 900.38 inhabitants per square mile (347.64/km^{2}). There were 106 housing units at an average density of 406.13 per square mile (156.81/km^{2}). The racial makeup of the village was 91.06% White, 1.70% African American, 0.43% Asian, 2.98% from other races, and 3.83% from two or more races. Hispanic or Latino of any race were 6.38% of the population.

There were 120 households, out of which 15.8% had children under the age of 18 living with them, 50.00% were married couples living together, 12.50% had a female householder with no husband present, and 34.17% were non-families. 25.83% of all households were made up of individuals, and 14.17% had someone living alone who was 65 years of age or older. The average household size was 2.33 and the average family size was 2.03.

The village's age distribution consisted of 12.7% under the age of 18, 7.8% from 18 to 24, 12.2% from 25 to 44, 30.3% from 45 to 64, and 36.9% who were 65 years of age or older. The median age was 58.8 years. For every 100 females, there were 93.7 males. For every 100 females age 18 and over, there were 95.4 males.

The median income for a household in the village was $52,857, and the median income for a family was $68,750. Males had a median income of $41,250 versus $27,292 for females. The per capita income for the village was $30,513. About 16.5% of families and 21.5% of the population were below the poverty line, including 51.7% of those under age 18 and 8.9% of those age 65 or over.
