= Prairie Center, Illinois =

- Unincorporated community
- Location within Illinois Location within the United States
- Coordinates: 41°28′08″N 88°56′04″W
- Country: United States
- State: Illinois
- County: LaSalle
- Townships: Ophir, Freedom
- Elevation: 673 ft (205 m)
- Time zone: UTC-6 (Central (CST))
  - Summer (DST): UTC-5 (CDT)
- Area codes: 815 & 779
- GNIS feature ID: 416097

Prairie Center is an unincorporated community located along U.S. Route 52 in LaSalle County, Illinois, United States, approximately 13 miles northwest of Ottawa.
