= Farm Ridge, Illinois =

- Unincorporated community
- Location within Illinois Location within the United States
- Coordinates: 41°13′30″N 88°54′47″W
- Country: United States
- State: Illinois
- County: LaSalle
- Township: Farm Ridge
- Elevation: 643 ft (196 m)
- Time zone: UTC-6 (Central (CST))
  - Summer (DST): UTC-5 (CDT)
- Area codes: 815 & 779
- GNIS feature ID: 1719760

Farm Ridge is an unincorporated community in Farm Ridge Township, LaSalle County, Illinois, United States. Farm Ridge is 4.3 miles (6.9 km) west of Grand Ridge.
