= Jonesville, Illinois =

- Unincorporated community
- Location within Illinois Location within the United States
- Coordinates: 41°18′41″N 89°04′17″W
- Country: United States
- State: Illinois
- County: LaSalle
- Elevation: 518 ft (158 m)
- Time zone: UTC-6 (Central (CST))
  - Summer (DST): UTC-5 (CDT)
- ZIP Code: 61348 (Oglesby)
- Area codes: 815, 779
- GNIS feature ID: 411231

Jonesville is an unincorporated community in LaSalle County, Illinois. The community is located along Illinois State Routes 71 and 351, serving as the latter's eastern terminus. It is also located near the Illinois River.

The community is part of the Ottawa, IL Micropolitan Statistical Area.

== History ==
Jonesville was created before the end of the Civil War in 1865. This was when the LaSalle County Carbon Coal Company opened a mineshaft, which was owned by O.L. Jones, the namesake of Jonesville. The mine closed in 1929, perhaps due to a strike by the miners. The mine was bought by Union Coal, who sold the land rather than reopening the mine.

== Transportation ==
While there is no fixed-route transit service in Jonesville, intercity bus service is provided by Burlington Trailways in nearby Peru.
