= Blakes, Illinois =

- Unincorporated community
- Location within Illinois Location within the United States
- Coordinates: 41°27′31″N 88°45′10″W
- Country: United States
- State: Illinois
- County: LaSalle
- Township: Serena
- Elevation: 610 ft (190 m)
- Time zone: UTC-6 (Central (CST))
  - Summer (DST): UTC-5 (CDT)
- Area codes: 815 & 779
- GNIS feature ID: 422472

Blakes is an unincorporated community in Serena Township, LaSalle County, Illinois, United States. Blakes is located along the Illinois Railway, 9.1 miles (14.6 km) north-northeast of Ottawa.
