= Fitchmoor, Illinois =

- Unincorporated community
- Location within Illinois Location within the United States
- Coordinates: 41°27′43″N 89°09′54″W
- Country: United States
- State: Illinois
- County: LaSalle
- Township: Troy Grove
- Elevation: 702 ft (214 m)
- Time zone: UTC-6 (Central (CST))
  - Summer (DST): UTC-5 (CDT)
- Area codes: 815 & 779
- GNIS feature ID: 422699

Fitchmoor is an unincorporated community in LaSalle County, Illinois, located on Meridian Road near the Bureau County line. It contains a few farmhouses, and a grain elevator, known until very recently as Fitchmoor Grain. It was purchased by Archer Daniels Midland and became ADM Fitchmoor.

== See also ==
- List of unincorporated communities in Illinois
