= Wilsman, Illinois =

- Unincorporated community
- Location within Illinois Location within the United States
- Coordinates: 41°10′16″N 88°55′55″W
- Country: United States
- State: Illinois
- County: LaSalle
- Township: Eagle
- Elevation: 640 ft (200 m)
- Time zone: UTC-6 (Central (CST))
  - Summer (DST): UTC-5 (CDT)
- Area codes: 815 & 779
- GNIS feature ID: 423317

Wilsman is an unincorporated community located in Eagle Township, LaSalle County, Illinois, United States.
