= Little Rock, LaSalle County, Illinois =

Former settlement in La Salle County, Illinois

Little Rock
- Former Settlement
- Location within Illinois
- Coordinates: 41°19′05″N 89°02′48″W
- Country: United States
- State: Illinois
- County: LaSalle
- Elevation: 459 ft (140 m)
- GNIS feature ID: 1748279
- FIPS code: 17-17099

Little Rock is a former settlement in La Salle County, Illinois. Little Rock was located on the south banks of the Illinois River, just northeast of Oglesby and southeast of LaSalle.
