= Stavanger, Illinois =

Community in United States

- Unincorporated community
- Location within Illinois Location within the United States
- Coordinates: 41°23′55″N 88°36′50″W
- Country: United States
- State: Illinois
- County: LaSalle
- Township: Miller
- Elevation: 676 ft (206 m)
- Time zone: UTC-6 (Central (CST))
  - Summer (DST): UTC-5 (CDT)
- Area codes: 815 & 779
- GNIS feature ID: 419078

Stavanger is an unincorporated community in Miller Township, LaSalle County, Illinois, United States. Stavanger is located along County Route 25, 6 miles (9.7 km) north of Seneca.

Its namesake is the Norwegian city of Stavanger.
