= Peterstown, Illinois =

- Unincorporated community
- Location within Illinois Location within the United States
- Coordinates: 41°29′53″N 89°08′48″W
- Country: United States
- State: Illinois
- County: LaSalle
- Township: Troy Grove
- Elevation: 709 ft (216 m)
- Time zone: UTC-6 (Central (CST))
  - Summer (DST): UTC-5 (CDT)
- Area codes: 815 & 779
- GNIS feature ID: 423064

Peterstown is an unincorporated community in LaSalle County, Illinois, United States.
