= Danway, Illinois =

- Unincorporated community
- Location within Illinois Location within the United States
- Coordinates: 41°25′57″N 88°41′30″W
- Country: United States
- State: Illinois
- County: LaSalle
- Township: Miller
- Elevation: 699 ft (213 m)
- Time zone: UTC-6 (Central (CST))
  - Summer (DST): UTC-5 (CDT)
- Area codes: 815 & 779
- GNIS feature ID: 422605

Danway is an unincorporated community in Miller Township, LaSalle County, Illinois, United States. Danway is 9.9 miles (15.9 km) northeast of Ottawa.

== History ==
A post office was established at Danway in 1872, and remained in operation until 1903. The community's name honors Daniel Way, a local pioneer.
