= East Wenona, Illinois =

- Former village
- Location within Illinois Location within the United States
- Coordinates: 41°03′26″N 89°02′50″W
- Country: United States
- State: Illinois
- County: LaSalle
- Township: Osage
- Elevation: 693 ft (211 m)

East Wenona was a village in Osage Township, LaSalle County, Illinois, United States. East Winona was located on the eastern border of the city of Wenona in Marshall County. The village was incorporated on May 7, 1908, and had a population of 367 in 1910 and 333 in 1920. The village disincorporated between 1925 and 1927. East Wenona was noted on the 1940 Census map of LaSalle County.
