= Cedar Point, Illinois =

Cedar Point
- Village
- Location of Cedar Point in LaSalle County, Illinois.

- Location of Illinois in the United States
- Coordinates: 41°15′54″N 89°07′34″W
- Country: United States
- State: Illinois
- County: LaSalle
- Township: Eden

Area
  - Total: 1.02 sq mi (2.64 km^{2})
  - Land: 1.02 sq mi (2.64 km^{2})
  - Water: 0 sq mi (0.00 km^{2})
- Elevation: 656 ft (200 m)

Population (2020)
  - Total: 266
  - Density: 260.5/sq mi (100.59/km^{2})
- Time zone: UTC-6 (CST)
  - Summer (DST): UTC-5 (CDT)
- ZIP Code(s): 61316
- Area code: 815
- FIPS code: 17-11982
- GNIS feature ID: 2397582

Cedar Point is a village in LaSalle County, Illinois, United States. The population was 266 at the 2020 census, down from 277 at the 2010 census. It is part of the Ottawa Micropolitan Statistical Area. North of town was the Cedar Point Mine, which operated from 1906 to 1924.

== History ==
The LaSalle Carbon Coal Company sunk the Number 5 Mine in 1906. The village was incorporated in 1922. The mine closed in 1924.

== Geography ==
According to the 2021 census gazetteer files, Cedar Point has a total area of 1.02 square miles (2.64 km^{2}), of which 1.02 square miles (2.64 km^{2}) (or 100.00%) is land.

== Demographics ==
Historical population
Census	Pop.	Note	%±
1910	545		—
1920	686		25.9%
1930	266		−61.2%
1940	279		4.9%
1950	296		6.1%
1960	308		4.1%
1970	304		−1.3%
1980	344		13.2%
1990	275		−20.1%
2000	262		−4.7%
2010	277		5.7%
2020	266		−4.0%
U.S. Decennial Census

As of the 2020 census there were 266 people, 100 households, and 49 families residing in the village. The population density was 260.53 inhabitants per square mile (100.59/km^{2}). There were 127 housing units at an average density of 124.39 per square mile (48.03/km^{2}). The racial makeup of the village was 88.72% White, 1.13% African American, 0.00% Native American, 0.00% Asian, 0.00% Pacific Islander, 1.88% from other races, and 8.27% from two or more races. Hispanic or Latino of any race were 4.89% of the population.

There were 100 households, out of which 30.0% had children under the age of 18 living with them, 27.00% were married couples living together, 9.00% had a female householder with no husband present, and 51.00% were non-families. 45.00% of all households were made up of individuals, and 27.00% had someone living alone who was 65 years of age or older. The average household size was 2.90 and the average family size was 2.12.

The village's age distribution consisted of 20.3% under the age of 18, 11.3% from 18 to 24, 24.4% from 25 to 44, 20.8% from 45 to 64, and 23.1% who were 65 years of age or older. The median age was 41.6 years. For every 100 females, there were 103.8 males. For every 100 females age 18 and over, there were 122.4 males.

The median income for a household in the village was $51,250, and the median income for a family was $68,125. Males had a median income of $52,250 versus $22,500 for females. The per capita income for the village was $26,851. About 12.2% of families and 14.6% of the population were below the poverty line, including 11.6% of those under age 18 and 20.4% of those age 65 or over.

== Transportation ==
While there is no fixed-route transit service in Cedar Point, intercity bus service is provided by Burlington Trailways in nearby Peru.
