= Waltham, Illinois =

- Unincorporated community
- Location within Illinois Location within the United States
- Coordinates: 41°26′00″N 89°00′37″W
- Country: United States
- State: Illinois
- County: LaSalle
- Township: Waltham
- Elevation: 692 ft (211 m)
- Time zone: UTC-6 (Central (CST))
  - Summer (DST): UTC-5 (CDT)
- Area codes: 815 & 779
- GNIS feature ID: 423284

Waltham is an unincorporated community located on E. 8th Road in Waltham Township in LaSalle County, Illinois, United States, approximately six miles north of Utica. It contains a church and several homes.
