= Serena, Illinois =

- Unincorporated community
- Location in Illinois Location in the United States
- Coordinates: 41°29′14″N 88°43′55″W
- Country: United States
- State: Illinois
- County: LaSalle
- Township: Serena
- Elevation: 633 ft (193 m)

Population (2020)
  - Total: 129
- Time zone: UTC-6 (CST)
  - Summer (DST): UTC-5 (CDT)
- ZIP code: 60549
- Area codes: 815, 779
- GNIS feature ID: 2806559

Serena is an unincorporated community and census-designated place in LaSalle County, Illinois, United States. As of the 2020 census, Serena had a population of 129. Serena has a post office with ZIP code 60549. Serena was the residence of Peg McDonnell Breslin, the first woman elected to the Illinois Appellate Court outside Cook County.

== Geography ==
Serena is located at 41°29′14″N 88°43′55″W. According to the 2021 census gazetteer files, Serena has a total area of 0.25 square miles (0.65 km^{2}), all land.

== Demographics ==
Serena first appeared as a census designated place in the 2020 U.S. census.

As of the 2020 census there were 129 people, 4 households, and 4 families residing in the CDP. The population density was 524.39 inhabitants per square mile (202.47/km^{2}). There were 59 housing units at an average density of 239.84 units per square mile (92.60 units/km^{2}). The racial makeup of the CDP was 89.92% White, 2.33% African American, 0.78% Native American, 2.33% Asian, and 4.65% from two or more races. Hispanic or Latino of any race were 6.20% of the population.
