= Sulphur Springs, Illinois =

- Unincorporated community
- Location within Illinois Location within the United States
- Coordinates: 41°25′09″N 88°46′27″W
- Country: United States
- State: Illinois
- County: LaSalle
- Township: Rutland
- Elevation: 515 ft (157 m)
- Time zone: UTC-6 (Central (CST))
  - Summer (DST): UTC-5 (CDT)
- Area codes: 815 & 779
- GNIS feature ID: 419337

Sulphur Springs is an unincorporated community in LaSalle County, Illinois, United States. Sulphur Springs is located on the east bank of the Fox River, 6 miles (9.7 km) northeast of Ottawa.
