= Kernan, Illinois =

- Unincorporated community
- Location within Illinois Location within the United States
- Coordinates: 41°08′34″N 88°44′23″W
- Country: United States
- State: Illinois
- County: LaSalle
- Township: Otter Creek
- Elevation: 663 ft (202 m)
- Time zone: UTC-6 (Central (CST))
  - Summer (DST): UTC-5 (CDT)
- Area codes: 815 & 779
- GNIS feature ID: 411424

Kernan (also Otter Creek) is an unincorporated community in LaSalle County, Illinois, United States.
