= Milla, Illinois =

- Unincorporated community
- Location within Illinois Location within the United States
- Coordinates: 41°08′29″N 88°59′00″W
- Country: United States
- State: Illinois
- County: LaSalle
- Township: Richland
- Elevation: 673 ft (205 m)
- Time zone: UTC-6 (Central (CST))
  - Summer (DST): UTC-5 (CDT)
- Zip: 61343
- Area codes: 815 & 779
- GNIS feature ID: 422980

Milla is an unincorporated community in Richland Township, LaSalle County, Illinois, United States. Milla is located along the Norfolk Southern Railway, 4 miles (6.4 km) east of Lostant.
