= Harding, Illinois =

- Unincorporated community
- Location within Illinois Location within the United States
- Coordinates: 41°31′04″N 88°50′56″W
- Country: United States
- State: Illinois
- County: LaSalle
- Township: Freedom

Area
  - Total: 0.17 sq mi (0.44 km^{2})
  - Land: 0.17 sq mi (0.44 km^{2})
  - Water: 0 sq mi (0.00 km^{2})
- Elevation: 656 ft (200 m)

Population (2020)
  - Total: 133
  - Density: 781.9/sq mi (301.88/km^{2})
- Time zone: UTC-6 (Central (CST))
  - Summer (DST): UTC-5 (CDT)
- Zip: 61350
- Area codes: 815 & 779
- FIPS code: 17-32876
- GNIS feature ID: 2806495

Harding is a census-designated place in Freedom Township, LaSalle County, Illinois, United States, 12 miles (19 km) north of the county seat of Ottawa.

As of the 2020 census, Harding had a population of 133.

== Background ==
When surveyors began to determine the size of the area, Harding was to be approximately one square mile; however, Harding is only 1/2 of a mile in length from north to south and 1/5 mile wide. Crooked Leg Creek runs along the southern border. Containing less than fifty houses, this town has a population of less than 150. The village has a United Methodist Church, volunteer fire fighting station, small cemetery and Harding Grade School. A small community building, centralized in the town, is used nearly every month to host a bluegrass music show. The mail is delivered by postal carriers from the nearest post office in Earlville.

== Demographics ==
Historical population
Census	Pop.	Note	%±
2020	133		—
U.S. Decennial Census

Harding first appeared as a census designated place in the 2020 U.S. census.

As of the 2020 census there were 133 people, 36 households, and 36 families residing in the CDP. The population density was 782.35 inhabitants per square mile (302.07/km^{2}). There were 60 housing units at an average density of 352.94 units per square mile (136.27 units/km^{2}). The racial makeup of the CDP was 93.23% White and 6.77% from two or more races. Hispanic or Latino of any race were 3.76% of the population.

There were 36 households, out of which 44.4% had children under the age of 18 living with them, 83.33% were married couples living together, 16.67% had a female householder with no husband present, and none were non-families. No households were made up of individuals. The average household size was 4.08 and the average family size was 4.25.

The CDP's age distribution consisted of 30.7% under the age of 18, 9.2% from 18 to 24, 20.2% from 25 to 44, 39.8% from 45 to 64, and 0.0% who were 65 years of age or older. The median age was 32.2 years. For every 100 females, there were 66.3 males. For every 100 females age 18 and over, there were 60.6 males.

The median income for a household in the CDP was $77,750. Males had a median income of $17,250 versus $21,625 for females. The per capita income for the CDP was $15,533. About 47.2% of families and 51.6% of the population were below the poverty line, including 78.7% of those under age 18.
