= Science, Illinois =

Coordinates: 41°19′46″N 89°0′30″W

Science was a community in LaSalle County, Illinois, United States, located along the Illinois River just south of modern-day Utica.
