= Dayton, LaSalle County, Illinois =

Dayton, Illinois
- Census-designated place
- Location within Illinois Location within the United States
- Coordinates: 41°23′11″N 88°47′49″W
- Country: United States
- State: Illinois
- County: LaSalle
- Townships: Dayton, Rutland

Area
  - Total: 1.90 sq mi (4.93 km^{2})
  - Land: 1.86 sq mi (4.81 km^{2})
  - Water: 0.046 sq mi (0.12 km^{2})
- Elevation: 584 ft (178 m)

Population (2020)
  - Total: 528
  - Density: 284.4/sq mi (109.82/km^{2})
- Time zone: UTC-6 (Central (CST))
  - Summer (DST): UTC-5 (CDT)
- Area codes: 815 & 779
- FIPS code: 17-18771
- GNIS feature ID: 2628549

Dayton is a census-designated place in LaSalle County, Illinois, United States. The community was built along the Fox River a few miles north of Ottawa. As of the 2020 Census, its population was 528.

A large share of the early settlers being natives of Dayton, Ohio caused the name to be selected.

== Geography ==
According to the 2021 census gazetteer files, Dayton has a total area of 1.90 square miles (4.92 km^{2}), of which 1.86 square miles (4.82 km^{2}) (or 97.58%) is land and 0.05 square miles (0.13 km^{2}) (or 2.42%) is water.

== Demographics ==
Historical population
Census	Pop.	Note	%±
2010	537		—
2020	528		−1.7%
U.S. Decennial Census

As of the 2020 census there were 528 people, 200 households, and 126 families residing in Dayton. The population density was 277.46 inhabitants per square mile (107.13/km^{2}). There were 226 housing units at an average density of 118.76 per square mile (45.85/km^{2}). The racial makeup was 90.53% White, 0.38% African American, 2.84% Asian, 2.27% from other races, and 3.98% from two or more races. Hispanic or Latino of any race were 6.44% of the population.

There were 200 households, out of which 18.5% had children under the age of 18 living with them, 56.50% were married couples living together, 2.50% had a female householder with no husband present, and 37.00% were non-families. 34.50% of all households were made up of individuals, and 7.50% had someone living alone who was 65 years of age or older. The average household size was 3.10 and the average family size was 2.38.

Dayton's age distribution consisted of 19.4% under the age of 18, 2.7% from 18 to 24, 20.4% from 25 to 44, 41.7% from 45 to 64, and 15.8% who were 65 years of age or older. The median age was 47.8 years. For every 100 females, there were 204.5 males. For every 100 females age 18 and over, there were 173.6 males.

The median income for a household in Dayton was $86,125, and the median income for a family was $96,618. Males had a median income of $46,731 versus $21,750 for females. The per capita income for the CDP was $39,920. About 3.2% of families and 5.3% of the population were below the poverty line, including none of those under age 18 and 5.3% of those age 65 or over.
