= Leeds, Illinois =

- Unincorporated community
- Location within Illinois Location within the United States
- Coordinates: 41°01′15″N 88°59′17″W
- Country: United States
- State: Illinois
- County: LaSalle
- Township: Osage
- Elevation: 679 ft (207 m)
- Time zone: UTC-6 (Central (CST))
  - Summer (DST): UTC-5 (CDT)
- Area codes: 815 & 779
- GNIS feature ID: 422905

Leeds is an unincorporated community in Osage Township, LaSalle County, Illinois, United States. Leeds is located along the BNSF Railway in the southern panhandle of LaSalle County, 3.8 miles (6.1 km) northeast of Rutland.
