= Earl Township, LaSalle County, Illinois =

Coordinates: 41°35′34″N 88°52′55″W

Earl Township
- Township
- Location in LaSalle County

- LaSalle County's location in Illinois
- Country: United States
- State: Illinois
- County: LaSalle
- Established: November 6, 1849

Area
  - Total: 37.48 sq mi (97.1 km^{2})
  - Land: 37.48 sq mi (97.1 km^{2})
  - Water: 0 sq mi (0 km^{2}) 0%

Population (2020)
  - Total: 2,432
  - Density: 64.89/sq mi (25.05/km^{2})
- Time zone: UTC-6 (CST)
  - Summer (DST): UTC-5 (CDT)
- FIPS code: 17-099-21527

Earl Township is located in LaSalle County, Illinois. As of the 2020 census, its population was 2,432 and it contained 1,107 housing units.

== Geography ==
According to the 2021 census gazetteer files, Earl Township has a total area of 37.48 square miles (97.07 km^{2}), all land.

== Demographics ==
As of the 2020 census there were 2,432 people, 1,190 households, and 779 families residing in the township. The population density was 64.89 inhabitants per square mile (25.05/km^{2}). There were 1,107 housing units at an average density of 29.54 per square mile (11.41/km^{2}). The racial makeup of the township was 91.00% White, 0.33% African American, 0.29% Native American, 0.33% Asian, 0.00% Pacific Islander, 3.21% from other races, and 4.85% from two or more races. Hispanic or Latino of any race were 8.14% of the population.

There were 1,190 households, out of which 29.30% had children under the age of 18 living with them, 49.83% were married couples living together, 11.01% had a female householder with no spouse present, and 34.54% were non-families. 29.40% of all households were made up of individuals, and 7.60% had someone living alone who was 65 years of age or older. The average household size was 2.38 and the average family size was 2.83.

The township's age distribution consisted of 22.8% under the age of 18, 11.8% from 18 to 24, 22.7% from 25 to 44, 26.5% from 45 to 64, and 16.2% who were 65 years of age or older. The median age was 38.3 years. For every 100 females, there were 105.5 males. For every 100 females age 18 and over, there were 98.0 males.

The median income for a household in the township was $53,929, and the median income for a family was $68,438. Males had a median income of $40,714 versus $19,833 for females. The per capita income for the township was $25,426. About 7.3% of families and 13.8% of the population were below the poverty line, including 15.5% of those under age 18 and 6.1% of those age 65 or over.

Historical population
Census	Pop.	Note	%±
2010	2,432		—
2020	2,595		6.7%
U.S. Decennial Census
