= Ottawa Township, LaSalle County, Illinois =

Coordinates: 41°20′54″N 88°52′50″W

Ottawa Township
- Township
- Location in LaSalle County

- LaSalle County's location in Illinois
- Country: United States
- State: Illinois
- County: LaSalle
- Established: November 6, 1849

Area
  - Total: 16.12 sq mi (41.8 km^{2})
  - Land: 15.20 sq mi (39.4 km^{2})
  - Water: 0.92 sq mi (2.4 km^{2}) 5.73%

Population (2020)
  - Total: 11,193
  - Density: 736.4/sq mi (284.3/km^{2})
- Time zone: UTC-6 (CST)
  - Summer (DST): UTC-5 (CDT)
- FIPS code: 17-099-56939

Ottawa Township is located in LaSalle County, Illinois. As of the 2020 census, its population was 11,193 and it contained 5,601 housing units.

== Geography ==
According to the 2021 census gazetteer files, Ottawa Township has a total area of 16.12 square miles (41.75 km^{2}), of which 15.20 square miles (39.37 km^{2}) (or 94.27%) is land and 0.92 square miles (2.38 km^{2}) (or 5.73%) is water.

== Demographics ==
As of the 2020 census there were 11,193 people, 4,940 households, and 2,767 families residing in the township. The population density was 694.18 inhabitants per square mile (268.02/km^{2}). There were 5,550 housing units at an average density of 344.21 per square mile (132.90/km^{2}). The racial makeup of the township was 85.80% White, 2.11% African American, 0.54% Native American, 0.98% Asian, 0.06% Pacific Islander, 2.69% from other races, and 7.82% from two or more races. Hispanic or Latino of any race were 10.20% of the population.

There were 4,940 households, out of which 26.10% had children under the age of 18 living with them, 35.73% were married couples living together, 14.57% had a female householder with no spouse present, and 43.99% were non-families. 37.30% of all households were made up of individuals, and 16.70% had someone living alone who was 65 years of age or older. The average household size was 2.25 and the average family size was 2.87.

The township's age distribution consisted of 21.8% under the age of 18, 7.3% from 18 to 24, 21.4% from 25 to 44, 30.6% from 45 to 64, and 19.0% who were 65 years of age or older. The median age was 44.6 years. For every 100 females, there were 94.2 males. For every 100 females age 18 and over, there were 91.4 males.

The median income for a household in the township was $52,685, and the median income for a family was $65,299. Males had a median income of $39,495 versus $25,569 for females. The per capita income for the township was $31,065. About 11.6% of families and 15.6% of the population were below the poverty line, including 23.7% of those under age 18 and 6.8% of those age 65 or over.

Historical population
Census	Pop.	Note	%±
2010	11,766		—
2020	11,193		−4.9%
U.S. Decennial Census

== Government ==
Ottawa Township is the center of the county government, with an Appellate Court branch, the County Courthouse, and County Offices located within Ottawa proper and within Ottawa Township.
