= Dimmick, Illinois =

- Unincorporated community
- Location within Illinois Location within the United States
- Coordinates: 41°26′25″N 89°06′59″W
- Country: United States
- State: Illinois
- County: LaSalle
- Township: Dimmick
- Elevation: 659 ft (201 m)
- Time zone: UTC-6 (Central (CST))
  - Summer (DST): UTC-5 (CDT)
- Area codes: 815 & 779
- GNIS feature ID: 422627

Dimmick is an unincorporated community in LaSalle County, Illinois located 4 miles (6.4 km) northeast of Peru in Dimmick Township. In recent years, it has increased in population, with the construction of the small "Dimmick Fields" subdivision.

== History ==
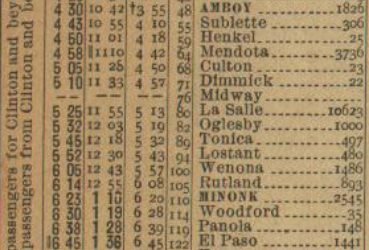
1906 timetable for the ICRR showing a passenger stop at Dimmick

The town was named for its founder, Daniel Dimmick, who emigrated here from Mansfield, Connecticut by way of Hennepin, Illinois in 1833. The railroad was extended to Dimmick c. 1865 by the Illinois Central Railroad. In 1873, a rail depot was constructed to replace an earlier one that had fallen into disrepair and the town was platted. By 1876, the town was home to three stores and a blacksmith. A post office was established at Dimmick in 1877, and remained in operation until 1912. Passenger service continued until the early 1930s before being discontinued.
