= South Ottawa Township, LaSalle County, Illinois =

Coordinates: 41°18′29″N 88°52′26″W

South Ottawa Township
- Township
- Location in LaSalle County

- LaSalle County's location in Illinois
- Country: United States
- State: Illinois
- County: LaSalle
- Established: November 6, 1849

Area
  - Total: 21.05 sq mi (54.5 km^{2})
  - Land: 19.67 sq mi (50.9 km^{2})
  - Water: 1.38 sq mi (3.6 km^{2}) 6.57%

Population (2020)
  - Total: 8,343
  - Density: 424.1/sq mi (163.8/km^{2})
- Time zone: UTC-6 (CST)
  - Summer (DST): UTC-5 (CDT)
- FIPS code: 17-099-71110

South Ottawa Township is located in LaSalle County, Illinois. As of the 2020 census, its population was 8,343 and it contained 3,812 housing units.

== Geography ==
According to the 2021 census gazetteer files, South Ottawa Township has a total area of 21.05 square miles (54.52 km^{2}), of which 19.67 square miles (50.95 km^{2}) (or 93.43%) is land and 1.38 square miles (3.57 km^{2}) (or 6.57%) is water.

== Demographics ==
As of the 2020 census there were 8,343 people, 3,174 households, and 2,145 families residing in the township. The population density was 396.27 inhabitants per square mile (153.00/km^{2}). There were 3,812 housing units at an average density of 181.06 per square mile (69.91/km^{2}). The racial makeup of the township was 88.94% White, 2.16% African American, 0.26% Native American, 0.96% Asian, 0.00% Pacific Islander, 2.09% from other races, and 5.60% from two or more races. Hispanic or Latino of any race were 7.35% of the population.

There were 3,174 households, out of which 35.00% had children under the age of 18 living with them, 49.87% were married couples living together, 13.86% had a female householder with no spouse present, and 32.42% were non-families. 29.20% of all households were made up of individuals, and 12.00% had someone living alone who was 65 years of age or older. The average household size was 2.45 and the average family size was 2.83.

The township's age distribution consisted of 24.1% under the age of 18, 8.9% from 18 to 24, 23.7% from 25 to 44, 24.3% from 45 to 64, and 19.0% who were 65 years of age or older. The median age was 36.0 years. For every 100 females, there were 72.3 males. For every 100 females age 18 and over, there were 78.0 males.

The median income for a household in the township was $60,556, and the median income for a family was $73,781. Males had a median income of $44,539 versus $28,065 for females. The per capita income for the township was $30,041. About 9.7% of families and 13.3% of the population were below the poverty line, including 18.8% of those under age 18 and 5.6% of those age 65 or over.

Historical population
Census	Pop.	Note	%±
2010	8,290		—
2020	8,343		0.6%
U.S. Decennial Census
