= Hope Township, LaSalle County, Illinois =

Coordinates: 41°08′40″N 89°05′17″W

Hope Township
- Township
- Location in LaSalle County

- LaSalle County's location in Illinois
- Country: United States
- State: Illinois
- County: LaSalle
- Settled: November 6, 1849

Area
  - Total: 36.36 sq mi (94.2 km^{2})
  - Land: 36.36 sq mi (94.2 km^{2})
  - Water: 0 sq mi (0 km^{2})

Population (2020)
  - Total: 570
  - Density: 16/sq mi (6.1/km^{2})
- Time zone: UTC-6 (CST)
  - Summer (DST): UTC-5 (CDT)
- FIPS code: 17-099-36100

Hope Township is located in LaSalle County, Illinois. As of the 2020 census, its population was 570 and it contained 283 housing units.

== Geography ==
According to the 2021 census gazetteer files, Hope Township has a total area of 36.36 square miles (94.17 km^{2}), all land.

== Demographics ==
As of the 2020 census there were 570 people, 267 households, and 180 families residing in the township. The population density was 15.67 inhabitants per square mile (6.05/km^{2}). There were 283 housing units at an average density of 7.78 per square mile (3.00/km^{2}). The racial makeup of the township was 93.68% White, 0.00% African American, 0.35% Native American, 0.53% Asian, 0.18% Pacific Islander, 1.40% from other races, and 3.86% from two or more races. Hispanic or Latino of any race were 4.39% of the population.

There were 267 households, out of which 30.70% had children under the age of 18 living with them, 51.69% were married couples living together, 7.49% had a female householder with no spouse present, and 32.58% were non-families. 22.10% of all households were made up of individuals, and 11.60% had someone living alone who was 65 years of age or older. The average household size was 2.48 and the average family size was 2.97.

The township's age distribution consisted of 25.9% under the age of 18, 8.7% from 18 to 24, 24.2% from 25 to 44, 25% from 45 to 64, and 16.0% who were 65 years of age or older. The median age was 38.3 years. For every 100 females, there were 121.0 males. For every 100 females age 18 and over, there were 119.2 males.

The median income for a household in the township was $77,813, and the median income for a family was $83,026. Males had a median income of $51,458 versus $30,156 for females. The per capita income for the township was $34,513. About 5.0% of families and 8.2% of the population were below the poverty line, including 10.5% of those under age 18 and 5.7% of those age 65 or over.

Historical population
Census	Pop.	Note	%±
2010	689		—
2020	570		−17.3%
U.S. Decennial Census
