= Grand Rapids Township, LaSalle County, Illinois =

Coordinates: 41°14′05″N 88°45′54″W

Grand Rapids Township
- Township
- Location in LaSalle County

- LaSalle County's location in Illinois
- Country: United States
- State: Illinois
- County: LaSalle
- Established: November 6, 1849

Area
  - Total: 35.60 sq mi (92.2 km^{2})
  - Land: 35.60 sq mi (92.2 km^{2})
  - Water: 0 sq mi (0 km^{2}) 0%

Population (2020)
  - Total: 299
  - Density: 8.40/sq mi (3.24/km^{2})
- Time zone: UTC-6 (CST)
  - Summer (DST): UTC-5 (CDT)
- FIPS code: 17-099-30744

Grand Rapids Township is located in LaSalle County, Illinois. As of the 2020 census, its population was 299 and it contained 125 housing units.

== Geography ==
According to the 2021 census gazetteer files, Grand Rapids Township has a total area of 35.60 square miles (92.20 km^{2}), all land.

== Demographics ==
As of the 2020 census there were 299 people, 85 households, and 59 families residing in the township. The population density was 8.40 inhabitants per square mile (3.24/km^{2}). There were 125 housing units at an average density of 3.51 per square mile (1.36/km^{2}). The racial makeup of the township was 93.98% White, 0.00% African American, 0.33% Native American, 0.00% Asian, 0.00% Pacific Islander, 2.68% from other races, and 3.01% from two or more races. Hispanic or Latino of any race were 5.69% of the population.

There were 85 households, out of which 16.50% had children under the age of 18 living with them, 64.71% were married couples living together, none had a female householder with no spouse present, and 30.59% were non-families. 23.50% of all households were made up of individuals, and 15.30% had someone living alone who was 65 years of age or older. The average household size was 2.51 and the average family size was 3.00.

The township's age distribution consisted of 12.7% under the age of 18, 15.5% from 18 to 24, 16.9% from 25 to 44, 45% from 45 to 64, and 9.9% who were 65 years of age or older. The median age was 46.6 years. For every 100 females, there were 85.2 males. For every 100 females age 18 and over, there were 67.6 males.

The median income for a household in the township was $123,594, and the median income for a family was $124,531. Males had a median income of $109,091 versus $21,250 for females. The per capita income for the township was $44,249. About 0.0% of families and 2.8% of the population were below the poverty line, including none of those under age 18 and none of those age 65 or over.

Historical population
Census	Pop.	Note	%±
2010	335		—
2020	299		−10.7%
U.S. Decennial Census
