= Hennepin Township, Putnam County, Illinois =

Coordinates: 41°12′54″N 89°18′14″W

Hennepin Township
- Township
- Location in Putnam County

- Putnam County's location in Illinois
- Country: United States
- State: Illinois
- County: Putnam
- Established: November 8, 1855

Area
  - Total: 43.24 sq mi (112.0 km^{2})
  - Land: 41.35 sq mi (107.1 km^{2})
  - Water: 1.89 sq mi (4.9 km^{2}) 4.37%

Population (2010)
  - Estimate (2016): 1,168
  - Density: 30.5/sq mi (11.8/km^{2})
- Time zone: UTC-6 (CST)
  - Summer (DST): UTC-5 (CDT)
- FIPS code: 17-155-34124

Hennepin Township is located in Putnam County, Illinois. As of the 2010 census, its population was 1,261 and it contained 573 housing units.

== Geography ==
According to the 2010 census, the township has a total area of 43.24 square miles (112.0 km^{2}), of which 41.35 square miles (107.1 km^{2}) (or 95.63%) is land and 1.89 square miles (4.9 km^{2}) (or 4.37%) is water.

== Demographics ==
Historical population
Census	Pop.	Note	%±
2016 (est.)	1,168
U.S. Decennial Census
