= Vermillion Township, LaSalle County, Illinois =

Vermillion Township
- Township
- Location in LaSalle County

- LaSalle County's location in Illinois
- Coordinates: 41°13′16″N 88°59′53″W
- Country: United States
- State: Illinois
- County: LaSalle
- Established: November 6, 1849

Area
  - Total: 23.09 sq mi (59.8 km^{2})
  - Land: 23.05 sq mi (59.7 km^{2})
  - Water: 0.04 sq mi (0.10 km^{2}) 0.18%
- Elevation: 636 ft (194 m)

Population (2020)
  - Total: 395
  - Density: 17.1/sq mi (6.62/km^{2})
- Time zone: UTC-6 (CST)
  - Summer (DST): UTC-5 (CDT)
- FIPS code: 17-099-77623

Vermillion Township is located in LaSalle County, Illinois. As of the 2020 census, its population was 395 and it contained 164 housing units.

== Geography ==
According to the 2021 census gazetteer files, Vermillion Township has a total area of 23.09 square miles (59.80 km^{2}), of which 23.05 square miles (59.70 km^{2}) (or 99.82%) is land and 0.04 square miles (0.10 km^{2}) (or 0.18%) is water.

== Demographics ==
As of the 2020 census there were 395 people, 142 households, and 113 families residing in the township. The population density was 17.11 inhabitants per square mile (6.61/km^{2}). There were 164 housing units at an average density of 7.10 per square mile (2.74/km^{2}). The racial makeup of the township was 97.22% White, 0.25% African American, 0.25% Native American, 0.00% Asian, 0.00% Pacific Islander, 0.25% from other races, and 2.03% from two or more races. Hispanic or Latino of any race were 1.27% of the population.

There were 142 households, out of which 26.10% had children under the age of 18 living with them, 64.08% were married couples living together, 10.56% had a female householder with no spouse present, and 20.42% were non-families. 16.90% of all households were made up of individuals, and 6.30% had someone living alone who was 65 years of age or older. The average household size was 2.21 and the average family size was 2.50.

The township's age distribution consisted of 18.5% under the age of 18, 5.1% from 18 to 24, 17.6% from 25 to 44, 35.4% from 45 to 64, and 23.6% who were 65 years of age or older. The median age was 48.8 years. For every 100 females, there were 115.1 males. For every 100 females age 18 and over, there were 111.6 males.

The median income for a household in the township was $80,500, and the median income for a family was $100,208. Males had a median income of $61,667 versus $34,167 for females. The per capita income for the township was $40,514. No of families and 1.6% of the population were below the poverty line, including none of those under age 18 and none of those age 65 or over.

Historical population
Census	Pop.	Note	%±
2010	387		—
2020	395		2.1%
U.S. Decennial Census
