= Triumph, Illinois =

Triumph
- Census Designated Place
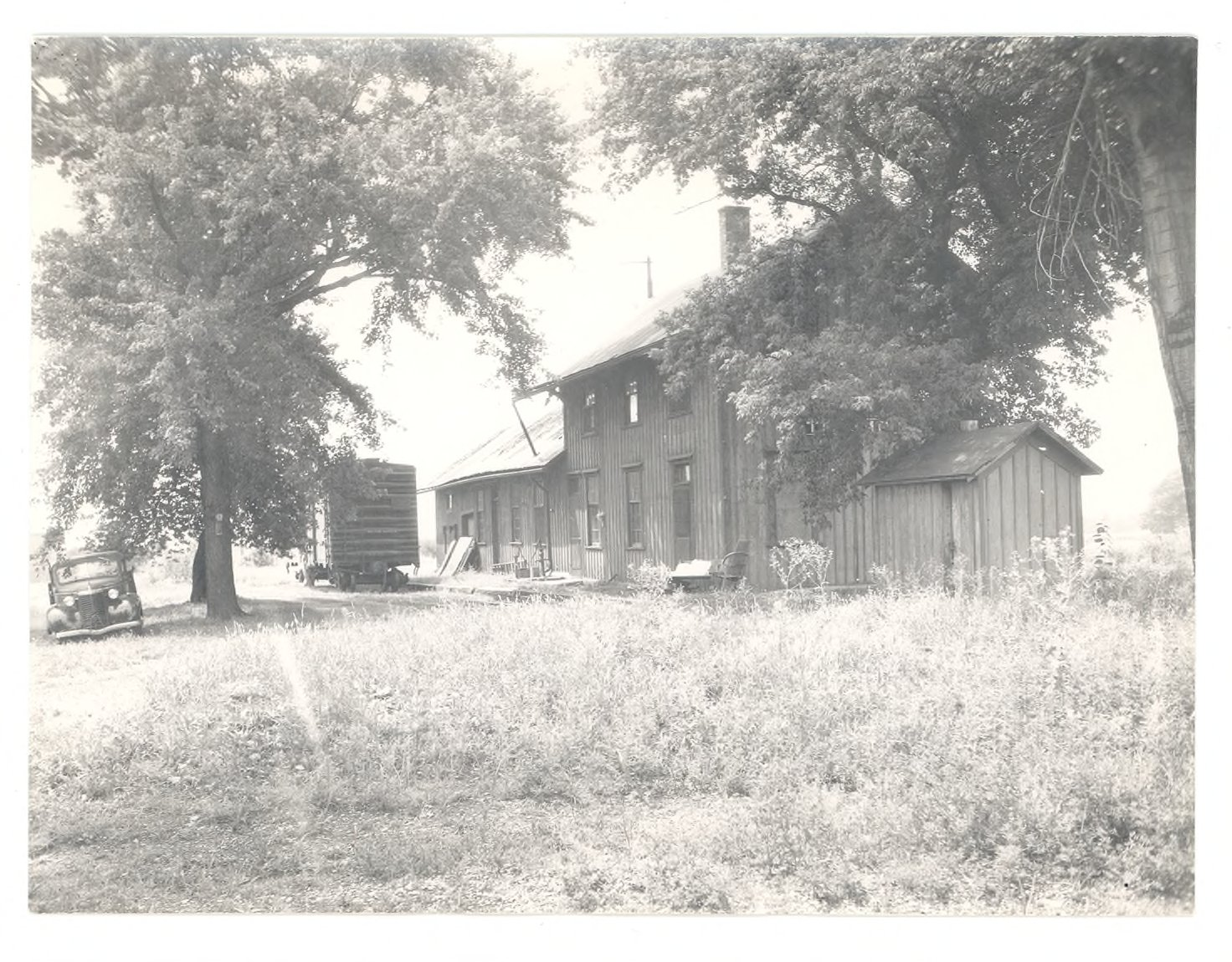
- Triumph Rail Depot in 1949

- Location of Triumph within Illinois Triumph (the United States)
- Coordinates: 41°29′58″N 89°01′19″W
- Country: United States
- State: Illinois
- County: LaSalle County
- Township: Ophir
- Elevation: 669 ft (204 m)
- Time zone: UTC-6 (CST)
  - Summer (DST): UTC-5 (CDT)
- ZIP Code: 61371
- Area code: 815/779
- GNIS feature ID: 2394496
- FIPS Code: 17-76082

Triumph is an unincorporated community and Census Designated Place located just east of Interstate 39 in LaSalle County, Illinois, United States. Students in Triumph attend nearby Mendota public schools. The village is home to one restaurant and is known for its curling club. The community has many farms surrounding it. As of the 2020 census, Triumph had a population of 100.

== History ==
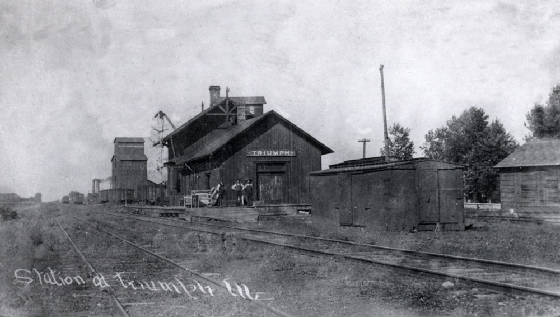
Triumph Depot circa 1910

Triumph was so named when supporters of establishing a post office "triumphed" over those who opposed it. The Triumph post office has been in operation since 1857. The Chicago Northwestern Railroad established a depot in Triumph around 1900. It stood until roughly 1950.

== Demographics ==
Triumph first appeared as a census designated place in the 2020 U.S. census.

As of the 2020 census there were 100 people, 48 households, and 38 families residing in the CDP. The population density was 671.14 inhabitants per square mile (259.13/km^{2}). There were 52 housing units at an average density of 348.99 units per square mile (134.75 units/km^{2}). The racial makeup of the CDP was 82.00% White, 1.00% African American, 3.00% Native American, 2.00% Asian, 0.00% Pacific Islander, 4.00% from other races, and 8.00% from two or more races. Hispanic or Latino of any race were 8.00% of the population.

There were 48 households, out of which none had children under the age of 18 living with them, none were married couples living together, none had a female householder with no husband present, and 20.83% were non-families. 20.83% of all households were made up of individuals, and none had someone living alone who was 65 years of age or older. The average household size was 1.89 and the average family size was 1.71.

The CDP's age distribution consisted of 0.0% under the age of 18, 0.0% from 18 to 24, 100% from 25 to 44, 0% from 45 to 64, and 0.0% who were 65 years of age or older. The median age was 28.2 years.
