= Adams Township, Illinois =

Township in Illinois, US

Adams Township
- Township
- Location in LaSalle County

- LaSalle County's location in Illinois
- Coordinates: 41°35′09″N 88°45′53″W
- Country: United States
- State: Illinois
- County: LaSalle
- Established: November 6, 1849

Area
  - Total: 33.11 sq mi (85.8 km^{2})
  - Land: 33.11 sq mi (85.8 km^{2})
  - Water: 0 sq mi (0 km^{2}) 0%
- Elevation: 676 ft (206 m)

Population (2020)
  - Total: 1,619
  - Density: 48.90/sq mi (18.88/km^{2})
- Time zone: UTC-6 (CST)
  - Summer (DST): UTC-5 (CDT)
- ZIP codes: 60531, 60551, 60552
- FIPS code: 17-099-00204

Adams Township is one of thirty-seven townships in LaSalle County, Illinois, United States. As of the 2020 census, it had a population of 1,619.

== Geography ==
According to the 2010 census, the township has a total area of 33.11 square miles (85.8 km^{2}), all land.

=== Cities, towns, villages ===
- Leland

=== Unincorporated towns ===
- Baker at 41.555587°N 88.811189°W

(This list is based on USGS data and may include former settlements.)

=== Cemeteries ===
The township contains these four cemeteries: Baker, Little Indian Creek, Pierce Family and Saint Clara Catholic.

== Demographics ==
As of the 2020 census, there were 1,619 people, 772 households, and 569 families residing in the township. The population density was 48.90 inhabitants per square mile (18.88/km^{2}). There were 664 housing units at an average density of 20.05 units per square mile (7.74 units/km^{2}). The racial makeup of the village was 89.93% White, 0.21%, 0.2% African American, 0.1% Native American, 0.6% Asian, 2.3% from other races, and 6.9% from two or more races. Hispanic or Latino of any race were 7.4% of the population.

There were 7,764 households, out of which 32.5% had children under the age of 18 living with them, 49.1% were married couples living together, 20.4% had a female householder with no husband present, and 26.3% were non-families. 20.5% of all households were made up of individuals, and 7.0% had someone living alone who was 65 years of age or older. The average household size was 2.41 and the average family size was 2.67.

In the township, the population was spread out, with 21.6% under the age of 18, 6.9% from 18 to 24, 30.2% from 25 to 44, 27.3% from 45 to 64, and 14.0% who were 65 years of age or older. The median age was 38.5 years. For every 100 females, there were 89.0 males. For every 100 females age 18 and over, there were 83.4 males.

The median income for a household in the township was $52,500, and the median income for a family was $60,048. Males had a median income of $45,069 versus $18,375 for females. The per capita income for the township was $24,315. 22.5% of families and 26.5% of the population were living below the poverty line, including 37.1% of those under eighteen and 1.1% of those over 65.

Historical population
Census	Pop.	Note	%±
2000	1,590		—
2010	1,646		3.5%
2020	1,619		−1.6%

== School districts ==
- Community Unit School District 2
- Leland Community Unit School District 1
- Somonauk Community Unit School District 432

== Political districts ==
- Illinois's 11th congressional district
- State House District 70
- State Senate District 35
