= Farm Ridge Township, LaSalle County, Illinois =

Coordinates: 41°14′13″N 88°51′55″W

Farm Ridge Township
- Township
- Location in LaSalle County

- LaSalle County's location in Illinois
- Country: United States
- State: Illinois
- County: LaSalle
- Established: November 6, 1849

Area
  - Total: 34.81 sq mi (90.2 km^{2})
  - Land: 34.78 sq mi (90.1 km^{2})
  - Water: 0.03 sq mi (0.078 km^{2}) 0.09%

Population (2010)
  - Estimate (2016): 879
  - Density: 26.4/sq mi (10.2/km^{2})
- Time zone: UTC-6 (CST)
  - Summer (DST): UTC-5 (CDT)
- FIPS code: 17-099-25583

Farm Ridge Township is located in LaSalle County, Illinois. As of the 2010 census, its population was 918 and it contained 376 housing units.

== Geography ==
According to the 2010 census, the township has a total area of 34.81 square miles (90.2 km^{2}), of which 34.78 square miles (90.1 km^{2}) (or 99.91%) is land and 0.03 square miles (0.078 km^{2}) (or 0.09%) is water.

== Demographics ==
Historical population
Census	Pop.	Note	%±
2016 (est.)	879
U.S. Decennial Census
