= Miller Township, LaSalle County, Illinois =

Coordinates: 41°24′32″N 88°38′35″W

Miller Township
- Township
- Location in LaSalle County

- LaSalle County's location in Illinois
- Country: United States
- State: Illinois
- County: LaSalle
- Established: Unknown

Area
  - Total: 35.20 sq mi (91.2 km^{2})
  - Land: 35.19 sq mi (91.1 km^{2})
  - Water: 0.02 sq mi (0.052 km^{2}) 0.05%

Population (2020)
  - Total: 574
  - Density: 16.3/sq mi (6.30/km^{2})
- Time zone: UTC-6 (CST)
  - Summer (DST): UTC-5 (CDT)
- FIPS code: 17-099-49204

Miller Township is located in LaSalle County, Illinois, United States. As of the 2020 census, its population was 574 and it contained 235 housing units. Miller Township was formed from Manlius Township and Mission Township on an unknown date.

== Geography ==
According to the 2021 census gazetteer files, Miller Township has a total area of 35.20 square miles (91.17 km^{2}), of which 35.19 square miles (91.14 km^{2}) (or 99.95%) is land and 0.02 square miles (0.05 km^{2}) (or 0.05%) is water.

== Demographics ==
As of the 2020 census there were 574 people, 269 households, and 212 families residing in the township. The population density was 16.31 inhabitants per square mile (6.30/km^{2}). There were 235 housing units at an average density of 6.68 per square mile (2.58/km^{2}). The racial makeup of the township was 91.29% White, 0.00% African American, 0.17% Native American, 0.17% Asian, 0.00% Pacific Islander, 1.92% from other races, and 6.45% from two or more races. Hispanic or Latino of any race were 7.84% of the population.

There were 269 households, out of which 3.00% had children under the age of 18 living with them, 61.71% were married couples living together, 6.32% had a female householder with no spouse present, and 21.19% were non-families. 10.40% of all households were made up of individuals, and 8.20% had someone living alone who was 65 years of age or older. The average household size was 2.27 and the average family size was 2.18.

The township's age distribution consisted of 2.5% under the age of 18, 14.8% from 18 to 24, 18.7% from 25 to 44, 28.7% from 45 to 64, and 35.4% who were 65 years of age or older. The median age was 59.5 years. For every 100 females, there were 90.6 males. For every 100 females age 18 and over, there were 89.5 males.

The median income for a household in the township was $107,688, and the median income for a family was $107,875. Males had a median income of $58,690 versus $20,875 for females. The per capita income for the township was $45,408. No families and 7.1% of the population were below the poverty line.

Historical population
Census	Pop.	Note	%±
2010	633		—
2020	574		−9.3%
U.S. Decennial Census
