= Wallace Township, LaSalle County, Illinois =

Coordinates: 41°24′14″N 88°53′02″W

Wallace Township
- Township
- Location in LaSalle County

- LaSalle County's location in Illinois
- Country: United States
- State: Illinois
- County: LaSalle
- Established: Unknown

Area
  - Total: 27.59 sq mi (71.5 km^{2})
  - Land: 27.58 sq mi (71.4 km^{2})
  - Water: 0.01 sq mi (0.026 km^{2}) 0.04%

Population (2020)
  - Total: 575
  - Density: 20.8/sq mi (8.05/km^{2})
- Time zone: UTC-6 (CST)
  - Summer (DST): UTC-5 (CDT)
- FIPS code: 17-099-78487

Wallace Township is located in LaSalle County, Illinois. As of the 2020 census, its population was 575 and it contained 220 housing units. Wallace Township was formed from Dayton Township on an unknown date.

== Geography ==
According to the 2021 census gazetteer files, Wallace Township has a total area of 27.59 square miles (71.46 km^{2}), of which 27.58 square miles (71.43 km^{2}) (or 99.96%) is land and 0.01 square miles (0.03 km^{2}) (or 0.04%) is water.

== Demographics ==
As of the 2020 census there were 575 people, 219 households, and 179 families residing in the township. The population density was 20.84 inhabitants per square mile (8.05/km^{2}). There were 220 housing units at an average density of 7.98 per square mile (3.08/km^{2}). The racial makeup of the township was 93.39% White, 0.00% African American, 0.00% Native American, 0.35% Asian, 0.00% Pacific Islander, 1.74% from other races, and 4.52% from two or more races. Hispanic or Latino of any race were 4.35% of the population.

There were 219 households, out of which 47.90% had children under the age of 18 living with them, 79.00% were married couples living together, 2.74% had a female householder with no spouse present, and 18.26% were non-families. 16.40% of all households were made up of individuals, and 6.80% had someone living alone who was 65 years of age or older. The average household size was 2.89 and the average family size was 3.28.

The township's age distribution consisted of 30.2% under the age of 18, 3.2% from 18 to 24, 39.7% from 25 to 44, 15.3% from 45 to 64, and 11.6% who were 65 years of age or older. The median age was 32.3 years. For every 100 females, there were 101.3 males. For every 100 females age 18 and over, there were 113.0 males.

The median income for a household in the township was $109,861, and the median income for a family was $119,750. Males had a median income of $94,375 versus $34,643 for females. The per capita income for the township was $40,736. None of the population was below the poverty line.

Historical population
Census	Pop.	Note	%±
2010	491		—
2020	575		17.1%
U.S. Decennial Census
