= Meriden Township, LaSalle County, Illinois =

Coordinates: 41°34′55″N 88°59′49″W

Meriden Township
- Township
- Location in LaSalle County

- LaSalle County's location in Illinois
- Country: United States
- State: Illinois
- County: LaSalle
- Established: November 6, 1849

Area
  - Total: 35.28 sq mi (91.4 km^{2})
  - Land: 35.28 sq mi (91.4 km^{2})
  - Water: 0 sq mi (0 km^{2}) 0%

Population (2020)
  - Total: 271
  - Density: 7.68/sq mi (2.97/km^{2})
- Time zone: UTC-6 (CST)
  - Summer (DST): UTC-5 (CDT)
- FIPS code: 17-099-48463

Meriden Township is located in LaSalle County, Illinois (United States). As of the 2010 census, its population was 324 and it contained 137 housing units.

== Geography ==
According to the 2021 census gazetteer files, Meriden Township has a total area of 35.28 square miles (91.37 km^{2}), all land.

== Demographics ==
As of the 2020 census there were 271 people, 195 households, and 76 families residing in the township. The population density was 7.68 inhabitants per square mile (2.97/km^{2}). There were 126 housing units at an average density of 3.57 per square mile (1.38/km^{2}). The racial makeup of the township was 95.57% White, 0.00% African American, 0.00% Native American, 0.00% Asian, 0.00% Pacific Islander, 0.74% from other races, and 3.69% from two or more races. Hispanic or Latino of any race were 4.06% of the population.

There were 195 households, out of which 19.50% had children under the age of 18 living with them, 29.74% were married couples living together, 0.00% had a female householder with no spouse present, and 61.03% were non-families. 61.00% of all households were made up of individuals, and 26.20% had someone living alone who was 65 years of age or older. The average household size was 1.98 and the average family size was 3.42.

The township's age distribution consisted of 18.1% under the age of 18, 2.8% from 18 to 24, 22.6% from 25 to 44, 35% from 45 to 64, and 21.5% who were 65 years of age or older. The median age was 49.2 years. For every 100 females, there were 78.7 males. For every 100 females age 18 and over, there were 87.0 males.

The median income for a household in the township was $66,094, and the median income for a family was $65,313. Males had a median income of $70,000 versus $20,000 for females. The per capita income for the township was $34,302. About 9.2% of families and 16.6% of the population were below the poverty line, including 42.9% of those under age 18 and none of those age 65 or over.

Historical population
Census	Pop.	Note	%±
2010	324		—
2020	271		−16.4%
U.S. Decennial Census
