= Manlius Township, LaSalle County, Illinois =

Coordinates: 41°20′06″N 88°38′32″W

Manlius Township
- Township
- Location in LaSalle County

- LaSalle County's location in Illinois
- Country: United States
- State: Illinois
- County: LaSalle
- Established: November 6, 1849

Area
  - Total: 24.31 sq mi (63.0 km^{2})
  - Land: 23.80 sq mi (61.6 km^{2})
  - Water: 0.51 sq mi (1.3 km^{2}) 2.11%

Population (2020)
  - Total: 6,150
  - Density: 258/sq mi (99.8/km^{2})
- Time zone: UTC-6 (CST)
  - Summer (DST): UTC-5 (CDT)
- FIPS code: 17-099-46448

Manlius Township is located in east-central LaSalle County, Illinois. As of the 2020 census, its population was 6,150 and it contained 2,730 housing units. It contains the town of Seneca and the eastern part of Marseilles.

== Geography ==
According to the 2021 census gazetteer files, Manlius Township has a total area of 24.31 square miles (62.96 km^{2}), of which 23.80 square miles (61.64 km^{2}) (or 97.89%) is land and 0.51 square miles (1.32 km^{2}) (or 2.11%) is water.

== Demographics ==
Historical population
Census	Pop.	Note	%±
2010	6,275		—
2020	6,150		−2.0%
U.S. Decennial Census

As of the 2020 census there were 6,150 people, 2,514 households, and 1,747 families residing in the township. The population density was 252.94 inhabitants per square mile (97.66/km^{2}). There were 2,730 housing units at an average density of 112.28 per square mile (43.35/km^{2}). The racial makeup of the township was 90.11% White, 0.72% African American, 0.46% Native American, 0.52% Asian, 0.02% Pacific Islander, 1.93% from other races, and 6.24% from two or more races. Hispanic or Latino of any race were 5.89% of the population.

There were 2,514 households, out of which 30.20% had children under the age of 18 living with them, 50.60% were married couples living together, 11.46% had a female householder with no spouse present, and 30.51% were non-families. 23.20% of all households were made up of individuals, and 9.90% had someone living alone who was 65 years of age or older. The average household size was 2.39 and the average family size was 2.75.

The township's age distribution consisted of 23.0% under the age of 18, 5.5% from 18 to 24, 25.6% from 25 to 44, 29.1% from 45 to 64, and 16.9% who were 65 years of age or older. The median age was 41.9 years. For every 100 females, there were 100.4 males. For every 100 females age 18 and over, there were 95.3 males.

The median income for a household in the township was $61,917, and the median income for a family was $78,413. Males had a median income of $52,546 versus $25,578 for females. The per capita income for the township was $30,927. About 12.3% of families and 16.3% of the population were below the poverty line, including 24.0% of those under age 18 and 5.1% of those age 65 or over.
