= Serena Township, LaSalle County, Illinois =

Coordinates: 41°30′33″N 88°45′38″W

Serena Township
- Township
- Location in LaSalle County

- LaSalle County's location in Illinois
- Country: United States
- State: Illinois
- County: LaSalle
- Established: May 1850

Area
  - Total: 37.42 sq mi (96.9 km^{2})
  - Land: 37.17 sq mi (96.3 km^{2})
  - Water: 0.25 sq mi (0.65 km^{2}) 0.66%

Population (2020)
  - Total: 1,191
  - Density: 32.04/sq mi (12.37/km^{2})
- Time zone: UTC-6 (CST)
  - Summer (DST): UTC-5 (CDT)
- FIPS code: 17-099-68692

Serena Township is located in LaSalle County, Illinois. As of the 2020 census, its population was 1,191 and it contained 473 housing units. Serena Township changed its name from Warren Township in May, 1850.

== Geography ==
According to the 2021 census gazetteer files, Serena Township has a total area of 37.42 square miles (96.92 km^{2}), of which 37.17 square miles (96.27 km^{2}) (or 99.34%) is land and 0.25 square miles (0.65 km^{2}) (or 0.66%) is water.

Serena Township is governed from the Village of Serena. The village has been incorporated since the early 1830s, and the Township Hall is located within town. The township has the Serena Fire Protection District, which serves nearby Northville, Mission, Miller, and Freedom Townships. Community Unit School District No. 2, which serves the area, is also headquartered in Serena, with the main High School for the district, as well as a Middle School and Elementary School located there as well. The township has US Highway 52 running through it as well.

== Demographics ==
As of the 2020 census there were 1,191 people, 239 households, and 204 families residing in the township. The population density was 31.83 inhabitants per square mile (12.29/km^{2}). There were 473 housing units at an average density of 12.64 per square mile (4.88/km^{2}). The racial makeup of the township was 90.85% White, 0.50% African American, 0.67% Native American, 1.18% Asian, 0.00% Pacific Islander, 1.43% from other races, and 5.37% from two or more races. Hispanic or Latino of any race were 5.79% of the population.

There were 239 households, out of which 40.60% had children under the age of 18 living with them, 71.55% were married couples living together, 13.81% had a female householder with no spouse present, and 14.64% were non-families. 14.60% of all households were made up of individuals, and 14.60% had someone living alone who was 65 years of age or older. The average household size was 3.49 and the average family size was 3.92.

The township's age distribution consisted of 38.5% under the age of 18, 4.9% from 18 to 24, 26% from 25 to 44, 10.3% from 45 to 64, and 20.4% who were 65 years of age or older. The median age was 35.3 years. For every 100 females, there were 83.7 males. For every 100 females age 18 and over, there were 105.2 males.

The median income for a household in the township was $73,875, and the median income for a family was $80,556. Males had a median income of $42,212 versus $35,052 for females. The per capita income for the township was $30,243. About 16.2% of families and 19.3% of the population were below the poverty line, including 31.5% of those under age 18 and 15.9% of those age 65 or over.

Historical population
Census	Pop.	Note	%±
2010	1,138		—
2020	1,191		4.7%
U.S. Decennial Census
