= Eagle Township, LaSalle County, Illinois =

Coordinates: 41°08′38″N 88°55′14″W

Eagle Township
- Township
- Location in LaSalle County

- LaSalle County's location in Illinois
- Country: United States
- State: Illinois
- County: LaSalle
- Established: November 6, 1849

Area
  - Total: 31.27 sq mi (81.0 km^{2})
  - Land: 31.27 sq mi (81.0 km^{2})
  - Water: 0 sq mi (0 km^{2}) 0%

Population (2020)
  - Total: 1,599
  - Density: 51.14/sq mi (19.74/km^{2})
- Time zone: UTC-6 (CST)
  - Summer (DST): UTC-5 (CDT)
- FIPS code: 17-099-21436

Eagle Township is located in LaSalle County, Illinois. As of the 2020 census, its population was 1,599 and it contained 724 housing units.

== Geography ==
According to the 2021 census gazetteer files, Eagle Township has a total area of 31.27 square miles (80.99 km^{2}), all land.

== Demographics ==
As of the 2020 census there were 1,599 people, 690 households, and 390 families residing in the township. The population density was 51.13 inhabitants per square mile (19.74/km^{2}). There were 724 housing units at an average density of 23.15 per square mile (8.94/km^{2}). The racial makeup of the township was 86.49% White, 1.50% African American, 0.31% Native American, 0.56% Asian, 0.00% Pacific Islander, 4.00% from other races, and 7.13% from two or more races. Hispanic or Latino of any race were 10.19% of the population.

There were 690 households, out of which 27.20% had children under the age of 18 living with them, 40.72% were married couples living together, 11.01% had a female householder with no spouse present, and 43.48% were non-families. 37.70% of all households were made up of individuals, and 21.60% had someone living alone who was 65 years of age or older. The average household size was 2.18 and the average family size was 2.91.

The township's age distribution consisted of 20.5% under the age of 18, 7.7% from 18 to 24, 19.3% from 25 to 44, 29.1% from 45 to 64, and 23.6% who were 65 years of age or older. The median age was 48.7 years. For every 100 females, there were 114.7 males. For every 100 females age 18 and over, there were 114.0 males.

The median income for a household in the township was $54,605, and the median income for a family was $72,917. Males had a median income of $52,412 versus $30,000 for females. The per capita income for the township was $30,925. About 6.2% of families and 15.0% of the population were below the poverty line, including 23.3% of those under age 18 and 9.9% of those age 65 or over.

Historical population
Census	Pop.	Note	%±
2010	1,697		—
2020	1,599		−5.8%
U.S. Decennial Census
