= Ophir Township, LaSalle County, Illinois =

Coordinates: 41°30′08″N 88°59′49″W

Ophir Township
- Township
- Location in LaSalle County

- LaSalle County's location in Illinois
- Country: United States
- State: Illinois
- County: LaSalle
- Established: May 1850

Area
  - Total: 34.97 sq mi (90.6 km^{2})
  - Land: 34.95 sq mi (90.5 km^{2})
  - Water: 0.02 sq mi (0.052 km^{2}) 0.05%

Population (2020)
  - Total: 436
  - Density: 12.5/sq mi (4.82/km^{2})
- Time zone: UTC-6 (CST)
  - Summer (DST): UTC-5 (CDT)
- FIPS code: 17-099-56224

Ophir Township is located in LaSalle County, Illinois. As of the 2020 census, its population was 436 and it contained 207 housing units. Ophir Township was originally named Fremont Township, but was renamed in May, 1850. It contains the census-designated place of Triumph.

== Geography ==
According to the 2021 census gazetteer files, Ophir Township has a total area of 34.97 square miles (90.57 km^{2}), of which 34.95 square miles (90.52 km^{2}) (or 99.95%) is land and 0.02 square miles (0.05 km^{2}) (or 0.05%) is water.

== Demographics ==
As of the 2020 census there were 436 people, 249 households, and 140 families residing in the township. The population density was 12.47 inhabitants per square mile (4.81/km^{2}). There were 207 housing units at an average density of 5.92 per square mile (2.29/km^{2}). The racial makeup of the township was 90.14% White, 0.46% African American, 0.92% Native American, 0.46% Asian, 0.00% Pacific Islander, 2.29% from other races, and 5.73% from two or more races. Hispanic or Latino of any race were 8.26% of the population.

There were 249 households, out of which 3.20% had children under the age of 18 living with them, 40.96% were married couples living together, 0.00% had a female householder with no spouse present, and 43.78% were non-families. 39.40% of all households were made up of individuals, and 10.00% had someone living alone who was 65 years of age or older. The average household size was 1.66 and the average family size was 2.09.

The township's age distribution consisted of 1.7% under the age of 18, 2.2% from 18 to 24, 39.9% from 25 to 44, 33.5% from 45 to 64, and 22.8% who were 65 years of age or older. The median age was 52.2 years. For every 100 females, there were 230.4 males. For every 100 females age 18 and over, there were 224.8 males.

The median income for a household in the township was $81,769, and the median income for a family was $86,563. Males had a median income of $62,031 versus $31,288 for females. The per capita income for the township was $56,252. None of the population was below the poverty line.

Historical population
Census	Pop.	Note	%±
2010	508		—
2020	436		−14.2%
U.S. Decennial Census
