= Waltham Township, LaSalle County, Illinois =

Coordinates: 41°24′43″N 88°59′23″W

Waltham Township
- Township
- Location in LaSalle County

- LaSalle County's location in Illinois
- Country: United States
- State: Illinois
- County: LaSalle
- Established: November 6, 1849

Area
  - Total: 36.04 sq mi (93.3 km^{2})
  - Land: 36.04 sq mi (93.3 km^{2})
  - Water: 0 sq mi (0 km^{2}) 0%

Population (2020)
  - Total: 510
  - Density: 14/sq mi (5.5/km^{2})
- Time zone: UTC-6 (CST)
  - Summer (DST): UTC-5 (CDT)
- FIPS code: 17-099-78682

Waltham Township is located in LaSalle County, Illinois. As of the 2020 census, its population was 510 and it contained 197 housing units.

== Geography ==
According to the 2021 census gazetteer files, Waltham Township has a total area of 36.04 square miles (93.34 km^{2}), all land.

== Notable people ==
LeRoy Hagenbuch - raised in Waltham Township - owner of Philippi Hagenbuch Inc. - owner of multiple patents primarily related to mining and off-highway hauling industries - Pit and Quarry Hall of Fame inductee (2013)
Travis Hagenbuch - raised in Waltham Township - winner of 5 Emmys related to lighting design and lighting direction - nominated for Oscar, Grammy and Kennedy Center awards

== Demographics ==
As of the 2020 census there were 510 people, 206 households, and 164 families residing in the township. The population density was 14.15 inhabitants per square mile (5.46/km^{2}). There were 197 housing units at an average density of 5.47 per square mile (2.11/km^{2}). The racial makeup of the township was 89.22% White, 0.39% African American, 0.20% Native American, 0.98% Asian, 0.00% Pacific Islander, 2.75% from other races, and 6.47% from two or more races. Hispanic or Latino of any race were 7.06% of the population.

There were 206 households, out of which 46.60% had children under the age of 18 living with them, 74.76% were married couples living together, 4.85% had a female householder with no spouse present, and 20.39% were non-families. 17.50% of all households were made up of individuals, and 14.60% had someone living alone who was 65 years of age or older. The average household size was 3.08 and the average family size was 3.58.

The township's age distribution consisted of 27.8% under the age of 18, 4.3% from 18 to 24, 12% from 25 to 44, 46.1% from 45 to 64, and 9.9% who were 65 years of age or older. The median age was 45.4 years. For every 100 females, there were 79.1 males. For every 100 females age 18 and over, there were 87.7 males.

The median income for a household in the township was $69,444, and the median income for a family was $70,000. Males had a median income of $65,814 versus $4,645 for females. The per capita income for the township was $27,950. About 0.0% of families and 1.6% of the population were below the poverty line, including 0.0% of those under age 18 and 6.3% of those age 65 or over.

Historical population
Census	Pop.	Note	%±
2010	446		—
2020	510		14.3%
U.S. Decennial Census
