= Troy Grove Township, LaSalle County, Illinois =

Coordinates: 41°29′29″N 89°06′45″W

Troy Grove Township
- Township
- Location in LaSalle County

- LaSalle County's location in Illinois
- Country: United States
- State: Illinois
- County: LaSalle
- Established: November 6, 1849

Area
  - Total: 35.71 sq mi (92.5 km^{2})
  - Land: 35.67 sq mi (92.4 km^{2})
  - Water: 0.04 sq mi (0.10 km^{2}) 0.11%

Population (2020)
  - Total: 1,259
  - Density: 35.30/sq mi (13.63/km^{2})
- Time zone: UTC-6 (CST)
  - Summer (DST): UTC-5 (CDT)
- FIPS code: 17-099-76238

Troy Grove Township is located in LaSalle County, Illinois. As of the 2020 census, its population was 1,259 and it contained 550 housing units.

== Geography ==
According to the 2021 census gazetteer files, Troy Grove Township has a total area of 35.71 square miles (92.49 km^{2}), of which 35.67 square miles (92.38 km^{2}) (or 99.89%) is land and 0.04 square miles (0.10 km^{2}) (or 0.11%) is water.

== Demographics ==
As of the 2020 census there were 1,259 people, 495 households, and 291 families residing in the township. The population density was 35.26 inhabitants per square mile (13.61/km^{2}). There were 550 housing units at an average density of 15.40 per square mile (5.95/km^{2}). The racial makeup of the township was 81.89% White, 2.30% African American, 0.56% Native American, 0.56% Asian, 0.00% Pacific Islander, 6.04% from other races, and 8.66% from two or more races. Hispanic or Latino of any race were 19.94% of the population.

There were 495 households, out of which 28.90% had children under the age of 18 living with them, 44.24% were married couples living together, 11.92% had a female householder with no spouse present, and 41.21% were non-families. 23.00% of all households were made up of individuals, and 12.70% had someone living alone who was 65 years of age or older. The average household size was 2.34 and the average family size was 2.95.

The township's age distribution consisted of 20.8% under the age of 18, 13.7% from 18 to 24, 20.7% from 25 to 44, 27.8% from 45 to 64, and 17.0% who were 65 years of age or older. The median age was 43.0 years. For every 100 females, there were 80.9 males. For every 100 females age 18 and over, there were 94.9 males.

The median income for a household in the township was $82,574, and the median income for a family was $112,543. Males had a median income of $37,000 versus $25,929 for females. The per capita income for the township was $42,449. About 8.9% of families and 12.6% of the population were below the poverty line, including 25.6% of those under age 18 and 1.5% of those age 65 or over.

Historical population
Census	Pop.	Note	%±
2010	1,333		—
2020	1,259		−5.6%
U.S. Decennial Census
