= Eden Township, LaSalle County, Illinois =

Coordinates: 41°14′18″N 89°06′51″W

Eden Township
- Township
- Location in LaSalle County

- LaSalle County's location in Illinois
- Country: United States
- State: Illinois
- County: LaSalle
- Established: November 6, 1849

Area
  - Total: 36.17 sq mi (93.7 km^{2})
  - Land: 36.17 sq mi (93.7 km^{2})
  - Water: 0 sq mi (0 km^{2}) 0%

Population (2020)
  - Total: 1,398
  - Density: 38.65/sq mi (14.92/km^{2})
- Time zone: UTC-6 (CST)
  - Summer (DST): UTC-5 (CDT)
- FIPS code: 17-099-22424

Eden Township is located in LaSalle County, Illinois. As of the 2020 census, its population was 1,398 and it contained 632 housing units.

== Geography ==
According to the 2021 census gazetteer files, Eden Township has a total area of 36.17 square miles (93.68 km^{2}), all land.

== Demographics ==
As of the 2020 census there were 1,398 people, 578 households, and 381 families residing in the township. The population density was 38.65 inhabitants per square mile (14.92/km^{2}). There were 632 housing units at an average density of 17.47 per square mile (6.75/km^{2}). The racial makeup of the township was 89.34% White, 0.36% African American, 0.14% Native American, 0.36% Asian, 0.00% Pacific Islander, 3.15% from other races, and 6.65% from two or more races. Hispanic or Latino of any race were 6.58% of the population.

There were 578 households, out of which 28.20% had children under the age of 18 living with them, 52.94% were married couples living together, 7.44% had a female householder with no spouse present, and 34.08% were non-families. 30.10% of all households were made up of individuals, and 10.40% had someone living alone who was 65 years of age or older. The average household size was 2.34 and the average family size was 2.85.

The township's age distribution consisted of 19.9% under the age of 18, 9.5% from 18 to 24, 21.3% from 25 to 44, 33.4% from 45 to 64, and 16.0% who were 65 years of age or older. The median age was 44.6 years. For every 100 females, there were 114.1 males. For every 100 females age 18 and over, there were 113.4 males.

The median income for a household in the township was $67,321, and the median income for a family was $79,792. Males had a median income of $54,417 versus $32,266 for females. The per capita income for the township was $31,510. About 6.8% of families and 10.6% of the population were below the poverty line, including 14.5% of those under age 18 and 9.2% of those age 65 or over.

Historical population
Census	Pop.	Note	%±
2010	1,471		—
2020	1,398		−5.0%
U.S. Decennial Census
