= U.S. Route 6 in Illinois =

Segment of American highway

U.S. Route 6
- Grand Army of the Republic Highway
- US 6 highlighted in red

Route information
- Maintained by IDOT
- Length: 179.88 mi (289.49 km)
- Existed: 1932–present

Major junctions
- West end: I-74 / US 6 in Moline
- I-74 / I-280 in Moline; I-80 / IL 110 (CKC) in Colona; I-180 in Princeton; I-39 / US 51 in LaSalle; I-55 in Channahon; I-80 in Joliet; I-355 Toll in New Lenox; I-57 in Markham; I-294 Toll in Harvey; I-80 / I-94 in Lansing
- East end: I-80 / I-94 / US 6 at Lansing

Location
- Country: United States
- State: Illinois
- Counties: Rock Island, Henry, Bureau, LaSalle, Grundy, Will, Cook

Highway system
- United States Numbered Highway System; List; Special; Divided; Illinois State Highway System; Interstate; US; State; Tollways; Scenic
← IL 5	→ IL 6

U.S. Route 6 (US 6) in the state of Illinois is an east–west arterial surface road that runs 179.88 miles (289.49 km) from the city of Moline in the Quad Cities area to Lansing at the Indiana state line.

== Route description ==
=== Quad Cities to La Salle–Peru ===
US 6 crosses the I-74 Bridge from Bettendorf, Iowa, south into Moline, concurrent with Interstate 74 (I-74). It remains with I-74 for five miles (8.0 km) until the intersection with I-280 south of the Rock River, where it continues south, then turns east at Quad Cities International Airport. It intersects I-80 as it leaves the Quad Cities area and closely parallels I-80 for the rest of its length in Illinois.

From the Quad Cities, US 6 travels east through the city of Geneseo. At Sheffield, US 6 overlaps US 34 through to Princeton. After an interchange with I-180, US 6 runs with Illinois Route 89 (IL 89) to Spring Valley. In the La Salle–Peru area, US 6 intersects with IL 251, IL 351 and I-39/US 51.

=== La Salle–Peru to Joliet ===
US 6 then runs past Ottawa, intersecting with the concurrent IL 23/IL 71 before joining with IL 71 for four miles (6.4 km). Further east, US 6 runs through Marseilles and Seneca, where IL 170 terminates. It then runs through Morris and overlaps IL 47 for a slight northward jog. At Channahon, US 6 has an interchange with I-55.

=== Joliet to Indiana ===
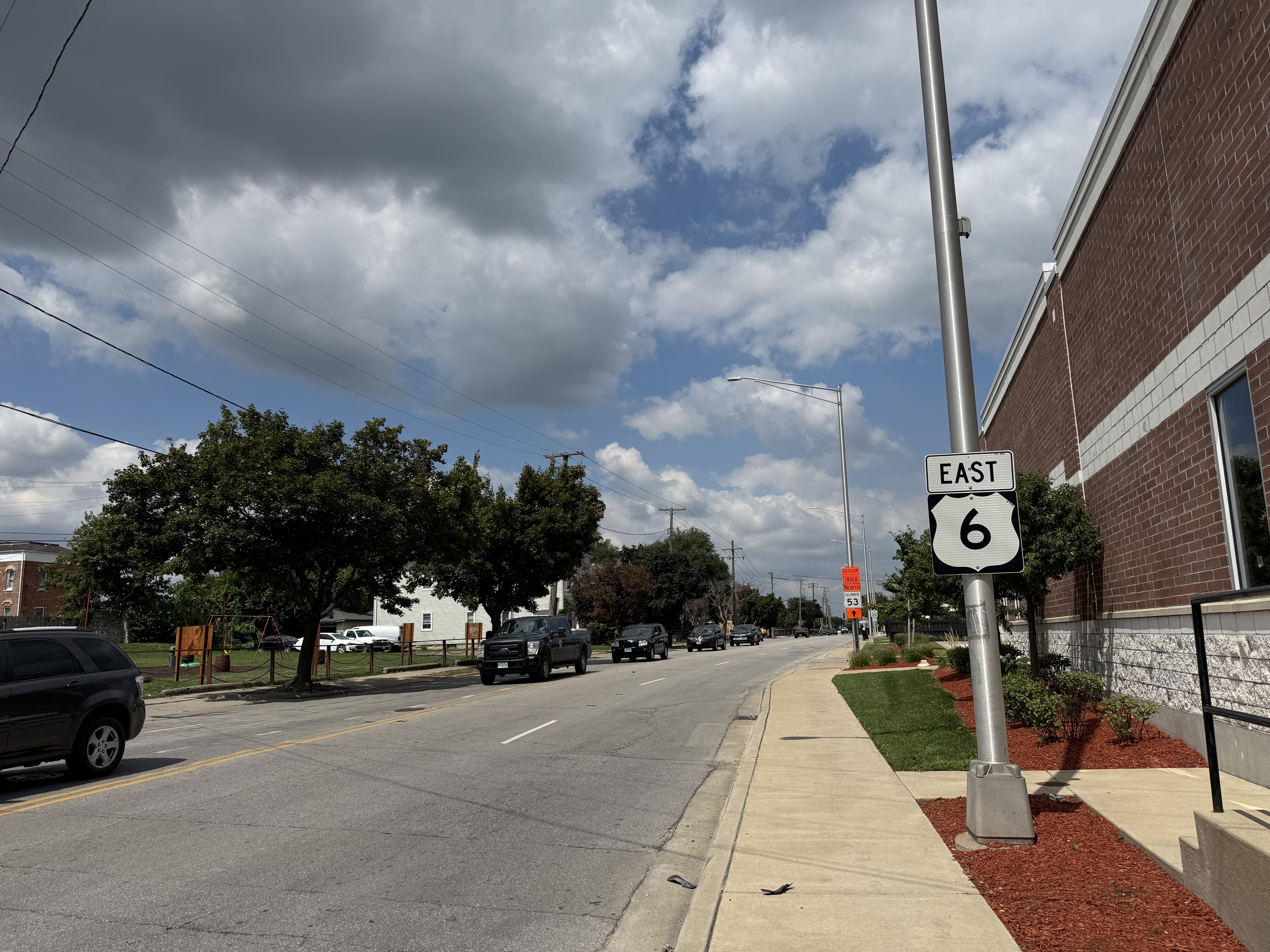
US 6 eastbound past US 30 in Joliet

In the Joliet area, US 6 parallels the Des Plaines River and passes beneath the cantilever bridge carrying I-80 over the Des Plaines River. At this point, it is called Railroad Street, but it turns onto McDonough Street with US 52 as it crosses the river. It then turns north, overlapping IL 53 (Chicago Street) and then east with US 30 (Cass Street). Two blocks north of leaving US 30, US 6 intersects the southern terminus of IL 171 and turns east onto Maple Road. In New Lenox, it intersects with I-355 and becomes Southwest Highway.

US 6 turns off Southwest Highway in Orland Park, heads north on Wolf Road briefly, then turns east onto 159th Street, a major east–west arterial through that town and the southern suburbs of Chicago. In Calumet City, US 6 joins with IL 83 south to the I-80/I-94 (Kingery Expressway) and then follows the Kingery east into Indiana.

Although US 6 enters the Chicago metropolitan area, it never enters the city limits of Chicago.

== History ==
US 6 first was shown on maps in 1932, mainly on its current routing except for a more southerly routing from Princeton to Spring Valley through DePue and at the Illinois–Indiana line. In 1934, both portions were changed to its current routing, from Princeton to Spring Valley and in Lockport. By 1939, US 6 was rerouted in the Quad Cities, briefly forming US 6 City. By 1953, the route was rerouted to travel along Torrence Avenue and part of the Kingery Expressway (from US 30 Alternate to Indiana state line).

Prior to the formation of US 6, the road west of Princeton was US 32. US 32 remained for several more years until the part east of Princeton became an extension of US 34.

== Major intersections ==
County	Location	mi	km	Destinations	Notes
Rock Island	Moline	0.0	0.0	I-74 west / US 6 west – Davenport	Iowa state line (I-74 Bridge over the Mississippi River)
Rock Island	Moline	see I-74 (exits 1-5)			
Rock Island	Moline	4.5	7.2	I-74 east / I-280 – Peoria, Chicago, Des Moines	Eastern end of I-74 overlap; signed as exit 5A (I-280 west)
Rock Island	Moline			Quad Cities International Airport	
Rock Island	Moline	5.4	8.7	US 150 east – Coal Valley	Western terminus of US 150
Henry	Colona Township	12.0	19.3	IL 84 north (400 East) – Colona	
Henry	Colona	13.1	21.1	I-80 / IL 110 (CKC) to I-74 / I-88 – Des Moines, Joliet	I-80 exit 9
Henry	Colona Township			Green River-Osco Road - Green River, Osco	former US 6 west; state maintained
Henry	Geneseo	22.7	36.5	IL 82 north (Henry Street) to IL 92	Western end of IL 82 overlap
Henry	Geneseo	23.5	37.8	IL 82 south (Oakwood Avenue) – Cambridge	Eastern end of IL 82 overlap
Henry	Atkinson			To Spring Street / IL 92	former IL 82 spur; state maintained
Henry	Annawan	36.9	59.4	IL 78 (Canal Street) – Prophetstown, Kewanee	
Bureau	Mineral Township	45.2	72.7	US 34 west – Kewanee	Western end of US 34 overlap
Bureau	Concord Township	49.0	78.9	IL 40 to I-80 – Rock Falls, Buda, Peoria	
Bureau	Princeton	60.6	97.5	US 34 east / IL 26 north (Main Street) / Illinois River Road (Princeton Spur) / Ronald Reagan Trail – Mendota, Dixon	Eastern end of US 34 overlap; western end of IL 26/Illinois River Road/Ronald Reagan Trail overlap; former IL 89 spur to Tiskilwa (state maintained outside Princeton)
Bureau	Princeton	61.3	98.7	IL 26 south (Sixth Street) / Illinois River Road (Princeton Spur) / Ronald Reagan Trail – Bureau Junction, Hennepin	Eastern end of IL 26/Illinois River Road/Ronald Reagan Trail overlap
Bureau	Selby Township	64.9	104.4	I-180 to I-80 – Hennepin	I-180 exit 3
Bureau	Selby Township			Depue Road - DePue	former US 6 east; state maintained
Bureau	Spring Valley	73.6	118.4	IL 89 north – Ladd	Western end of IL 89 overlap
Bureau	Spring Valley	75.6	121.7	IL 29 / Illinois River Road south – DePue	Western end of Illinois River Road overlap
Bureau	Spring Valley	76.8	123.6	IL 89 south (Spaulding Street)	Eastern end of IL 89 overlap
LaSalle	Peru	81.0	130.4	IL 251 to I-80 – Mendota, Tonica	interchange
LaSalle	LaSalle	82.2	132.3	I&M Canal Passage west (Marquette Street)	Western end of I&M Canal Passage overlap
LaSalle	LaSalle	82.3	132.4	IL 351 south (Joliet Street) – Oglesby	Western end of IL 351 overlap
LaSalle	LaSalle	82.5	132.8	IL 351 north (Joliet Street) to I-80	Eastern end of IL 351 overlap
LaSalle	LaSalle	83.8	134.9	I-39 / US 51 – Rockford, Bloomington, Normal	I-39 exit 57
LaSalle	North Utica	87.7	141.1	IL 178 / Illinois River Road north / I&M Canal Passage east – North Utica	Eastern end of Illinois River Road / I&M Canal Passage overlap
LaSalle	Ottawa	96.8	155.8	IL 23 / IL 71 west / Illinois River Road south / I&M Canal Passage west (Columbus Street) – DeKalb, Streator	Western end of IL 71 / Illinois River Road / I&M Canal Passage overlap
LaSalle	Ottawa	98.5	158.5	I&M Canal Passage east (2871st Road)	Eastern end of I&M Canal Passage overlap
LaSalle	Rutland Township	99.0	159.3	IL 71 east – Oswego	Eastern end of IL 71 overlap
LaSalle	Marseilles	104.3	167.9	I&M Canal Passage west (Main Street) – Illini State Park	Western end of I&M Canal Passage overlap
LaSalle	Seneca	109.7	176.5	IL 170 south (Main Street) / CR 25 (East 29th Road) – Ransom	
Grundy	Morris	121.7	195.9	IL 47 south (Division Street) – Dwight	Western end of IL 47 overlap
Grundy	Morris	122.4	197.0	IL 47 north (Division Street) – Yorkville	Eastern end of IL 47 overlap
Grundy–Will county line	Channahon	132.2	212.8	I&M Canal Passage west (Bell Road)	Western end of I&M Canal Passage overlap
Will	Channahon	133.3	214.5	DuPage River Bridge; Illinois River Road ends	
Will	Channahon	136.2	219.2	I-55 – Chicago, Bloomington	I-55 exit 248
Will	Joliet Township	140.9	226.8	IL 7 north (Larkin Avenue) to I-80	
Will	Joliet Township	142.0	228.5	I&M Canal Passage east (Brandon Road)	East end of I&M Canal Passage overlap
Will	Joliet	143.2	230.5	US 52 west (McDonough Street)	Western end of US 52 overlap
Will	Joliet	143.7	231.3	US 52 east / IL 53 south / Historic US 66 west (Chicago Street) to I-80	Eastern end of US 52 overlap; western end of IL 53 / Historic US 66 overlap
Will	Joliet			US 30 west / Lincoln Highway west (Cass Street) / IL 53 north / Historic US 66 east (Scott Street)	eastern end of IL 53 / Historic US 66 overlap; western end of US 30 / Lincoln Highway overlap
Will	Joliet			US 30 east / Lincoln Highway east (Cass Street)	eastern end of US 30 / Lincoln Highway overlap
Will	Joliet	145.1	233.5	IL 171 north (Collins Street)	
Will	New Lenox	150.6	242.4	I-355 Toll (Veterans Memorial Tollway) to I-80 – West Suburbs	I-355 exit 1
Will	New Lenox Township			Cedar Road - New Lenox	state maintained
Cook	Orland Park	157.4	253.3	IL 7 (159th Street / Wolf Road) – Orland Park, Lockport	
Cook	Orland Park	159.4	256.5	US 45 (LaGrange Road)	
Cook	Tinley Park–Orland Park village line	162.4	261.4	IL 43 (Harlem Avenue)	
Cook	Oak Forest	165.4	266.2	IL 50 (Cicero Avenue)	
Cook	Markham	166.8	268.4	I-57 to I-294 Toll north – Chicago, Kankakee	I-57 exit 348
Cook	Markham	168.3	270.9	I-294 Toll (Tri-State Tollway) to I-80 – Wisconsin, Indiana, Hammond	I-294 exit 6
Cook	Harvey			Wood Street	former US 54; state maintained
Cook	Harvey	170.6	274.6	IL 1 (Halsted Street)	
Cook	South Holland	173.3	278.9	I-94 (Bishop Ford Freeway) – Chicago, Indiana	I-94 exit 73
Cook	Calumet City	174.6	281.0	IL 83 north (Torrence Avenue)	Western end of IL 83 overlap
Cook	Lansing	176.2	283.6	IL 83 south (Torrence Avenue) I-80 west / I-94 west (Kingery Expressway) to I-294 Toll north	Eastern end of IL 83 overlap; western end of I-80/I-94 overlap; I-80 exit 161
Cook	Lansing	178.0	286.5	I-80 east / I-94 east / US 6 east (Borman Expressway) – Toledo, Detroit	Indiana state line
1.000 mi = 1.609 km; 1.000 km = 0.621 mi: Concurrency terminus; Electronic toll collection; Incomplete access

U.S. Route 6
Previous state: Iowa	Illinois	Next state: Indiana
