= Illinois River Road =

Road in Central Illinois, USA

Illinois River Road
- Route of the Voyageurs

Route information
- Maintained by IDOT

Location
- Country: United States
- State: Illinois

Highway system
- Scenic Byways; National; National Forest; BLM; NPS; Illinois State Highway System; Interstate; US; State; Tollways; Scenic

The Illinois River Road: Route of the Voyageurs is a National Scenic Byway in Central Illinois, United States.

It traverses a set of roadways on both sides of the Illinois River, primarily between Ottawa, Illinois to the north, and Havana, Illinois to the south. Along its route are nature areas, cities and towns, museums and other attractions.

The byway traverses portions of the following routes:

- Interstate 180
- U.S. Route 150
- U.S. Route 24
- U.S. Route 34
- U.S. Route 6
- Illinois Route 9
- Illinois Route 23
- Illinois Route 23
- Illinois Route 26
- Illinois Route 29
- Illinois Route 71
- Illinois Route 78
- Illinois Route 116
- Illinois Route 178
- Illinois Route 351
