= Interstate 80 in Illinois =

Highway in Illinois

Interstate 80
- I-80 highlighted in red

Route information
- Maintained by IDOT and ISTHA
- Length: 163.52 mi (263.16 km)
- Existed: 1967–present
- NHS: Entire route

Major junctions
- West end: I-80 at East Moline
- I-88 / IL 5 / IL 92 / IL 110 (CKC) in East Moline; I-74 / I-280 / IL 110 (CKC) in Colona; I-180 in Princeton; I-39 / US 51 in LaSalle; I-55 in Channahon; I-355 Toll in New Lenox; I-57 in Country Club Hills; I-294 Toll in Hazel Crest; I-94 / I-294 Toll / IL 394 in South Holland; US 6 / IL 83 in Lansing
- East end: I-80 / I-94 / US 6 at Lansing

Location
- Country: United States
- State: Illinois
- Counties: Rock Island, Henry, Bureau, LaSalle, Grundy, Kendall, Will, Cook

Highway system
- Interstate Highway System; Main; Auxiliary; Suffixed; Business; Future; Illinois State Highway System; Interstate; US; State; Tollways; Scenic
← IL 78	→ IL 81

Interstate 80 (I-80) is a part of the Interstate Highway System that runs from San Francisco, California, to Teaneck, New Jersey. I-80 enters Illinois from Iowa in the west, southwest of Rapids City, and runs generally eastward through East Moline, LaSalle, and Joliet, before entering Indiana in Lansing. The Interstate runs for approximately 163.52 miles (263.16 km) through the state.

In the 1920s, two state highways followed the general alignment that I-80 takes. In 1932, US Route 6 (US 6) was extended through Illinois, paralleling the alignment that I-80 in Illinois takes today. Construction started in 1957, and I-80 was completed in 1968. In the early 1990s, Illinois wanted to reroute I-80 in the Quad Cities area. At the same time, the section of I-80 that is concurrent with I-294 was reconstructed. The portion of I-80 that is concurrent with the Kingery Expressway was rebuilt in the mid-2000s.

== Route description ==
I-80 extends from west to east across the northern portion of the state through the population centers of the Quad Cities and south Chicago suburbs. The freeway is mostly maintained by the Illinois Department of Transportation (IDOT); the Illinois State Toll Highway Authority (ISTHA) maintains the section of I-80 concurrent with the Tri-State Tollway. The busiest section of the freeway is between the I-94 and Illinois Route 83 (IL 83) interchanges in Lansing. Approximately 181,200 vehicles used the freeway on average each day in 2011; in contrast, the lowest traffic level was 16,400 vehicles between the IL 78 and IL 40 interchanges in Henry and Bureau counties. I-80 contains between a minimum of four lanes and a maximum of 10 lanes total. The majority of the highway runs through farmland and urban areas.

=== Iowa to Interstate 39 ===
I-80 enters Illinois on the Fred Schwengel Memorial Bridge over the Mississippi River, southwest of Rapids City. After leaving the bridge, the Interstate has a folded diamond interchange with IL 84. The highway heads south, as a four-lane Interstate, passing along the east side of the Quad Cities. Eastbound I-80 traffic has access to an Illinois Welcome Center. The road has a cloverleaf interchange with the western terminus of I-88. After the interchange with I-88, the highway crosses over Rock River. The Interstate has a diamond interchange with US 6, before having an interchange with I-74 in East Moline. At this interchange, I-80 turns easterly paralleling US 6 and leaving the Quad Cities area. East of the Quad Cities, the Interstate passes through rural farmland as a four-lane Interstate. The road passes south of Geneseo, with the city having one interchange at IL 82. The road passes south of Atkinson, before passing over US 6 and a railroad track.

After crossing over the railroad tracks, the Interstate has an interchange with IL 78, north of Annawan. The Interstate continues toward the east having a folded diamond interchange with IL 40, before having rest areas on both sides of the roadway. The highway passes on the north side of Princeton, having an interchange with IL 26, near a commercial part of the city. I-80 passes over US 34, before leaving Princeton and having an interchange with the northern terminus of I-180. The Interstate has a rural interchange with IL 89, before entering LaSalle. In LaSalle, the highway has a diamond interchange with 103 Road, just north of the Illinois Valley Regional Airport. The highway has an interchange with IL 251, with commercial properties around the interchange. I-80 has an interchange with IL 351, just south of the Mitchell's Grove Nature Preserve, before having an interchange with I-39/US 51.

=== Interstate 39 to Indiana ===
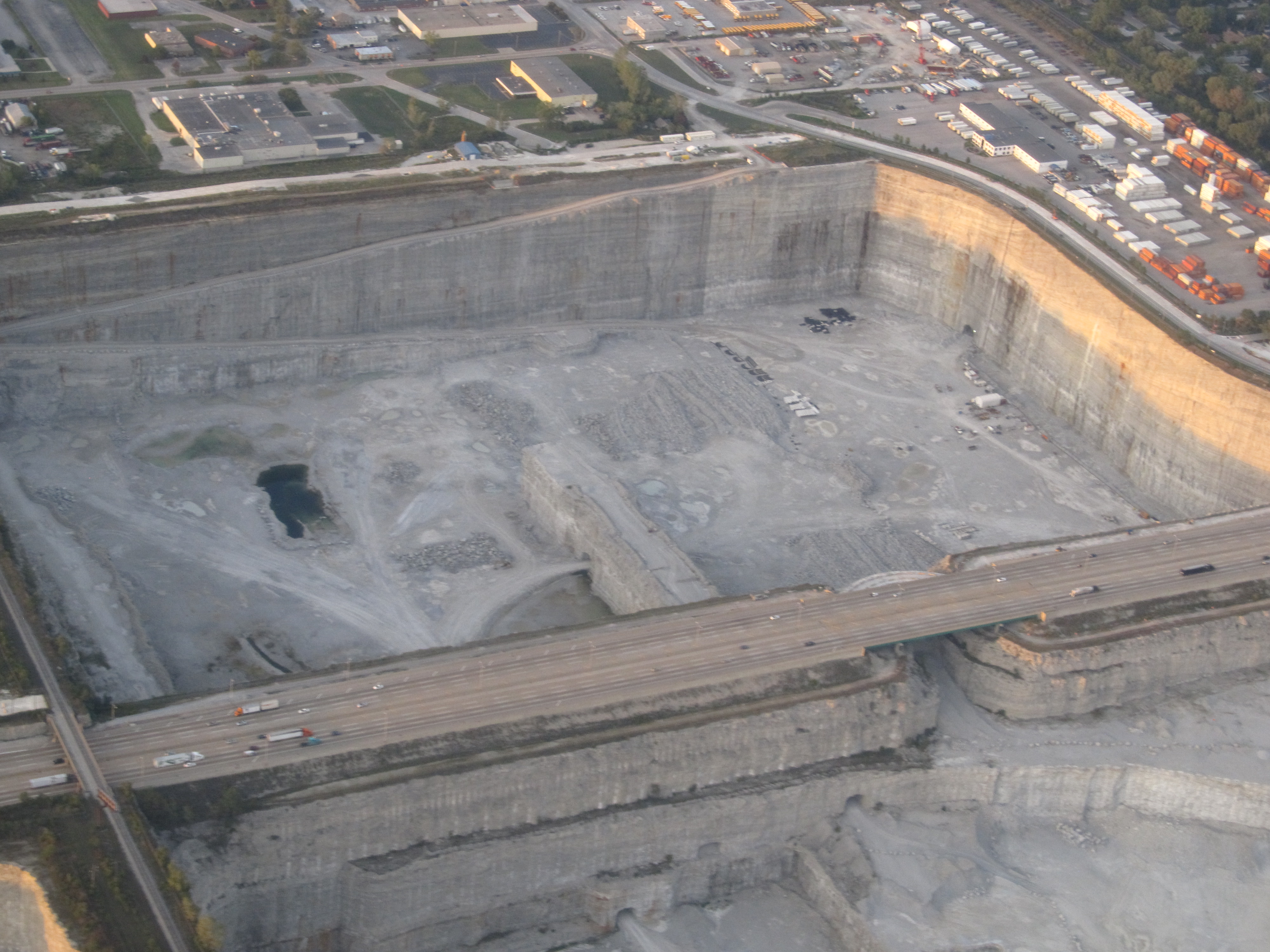
Thornton Quarry with I-80/I-294/Tri-State Tollway above

After the interchange with I-39, I-80 leaves LaSalle, heading toward the east and passing through rural farmland. Between 12th road and 14th Road the Interstate passes the AASHO Road Test site, one of old test loops used for testing different types of road surfaces in the 1950s. The Interstate enters Ottawa and has an interchange with IL 23, near many commercial businesses. After IL 23, the freeway leaves Ottawa and crosses over the Fox River, before having an interchange with IL 71. The road passes through rural farmland, having a few rural interchanges before entering Morris. In Morris the roadway curves toward the northeast, having an interchange with IL 47, near many commercial properties. The highway leaves Morris, passing through farmland and having a rural interchange with a county road. Both directions of I-80 have a rest area before entering Minooka. In Minooka, the highway curves to the east, before turning back toward the northeast and leaving the village. The road enters Will County by curving toward the northeast. I-80 curves towards the east, before having an interchange with I-55.

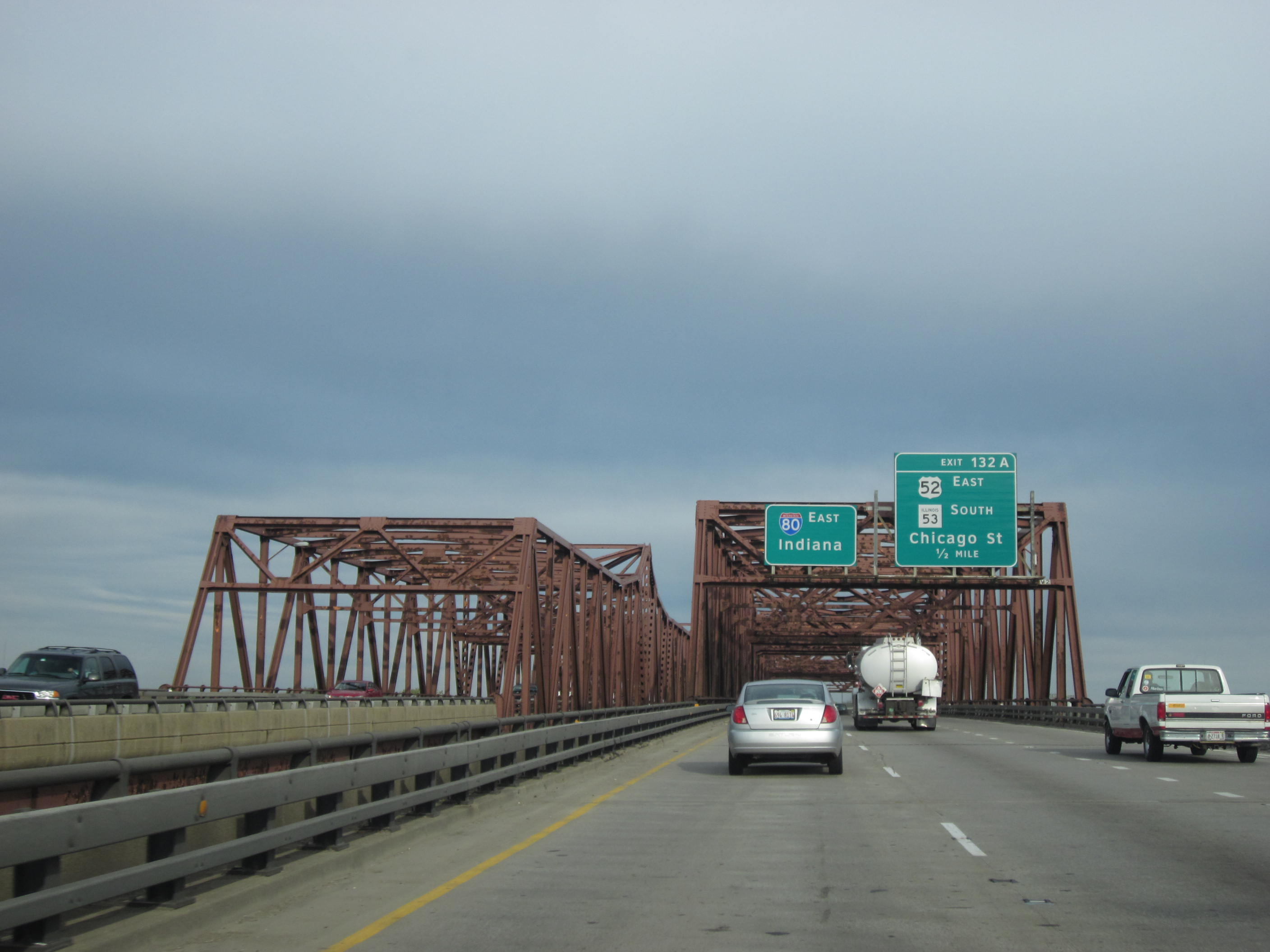
I-80 approaching the Des Plaines River Bridge

After I-55, I-80 enters Joliet, passing near many warehouses. The road has an interchange with IL 7, before passing through Rockdale. The road crosses over the Des Plaines River on the Des Plaines River Bridge. After the river, the freeway has an interchange with US 52/IL 53. East of Joliet, the road has a folded diamond interchange with US 30, before passing southeast of Potawatomi Woods County Forest Preserve. While passing through the preserve, the roadway widens to six lanes, before encountering an interchange with the southern terminus of I-355 (Veterans Memorial Tollway). The residential properties end and the highway passes through a more industrial area, before passing through the Yankee Woods (Cook County Forest Preserve).

After the preserve, I-80 has an interchange with I-57. I-80 joins the Tri-State Tollway (I-294) heading toward the east as a 10-lane tollway. The tollway passes over the Metra Electric District near Hazel Crest, before having an interchange with IL 1. After IL 1, the roadway narrows to eight-lanes and passes through the Thornton Quarry. The tollway passes under the Chicago Southland Lincoln Oasis, before passing north of Wampum Lake. After passing the lake, the tollway has an interchange with I-94. At this interchange with I-94, the Tri-State Tollway and I-294 both end, with I-94 running concurrent with I-80 toward the east. The concurrency between I-80 and I-94 travels on a freeway locally known as the Kingery Expressway. The Interstate has a single-point urban interchange (SPUI) with IL 83 and the western end of the US 6 concurrency. East of the US 6 exit, the freeway become a 10-lane Interstate, passing near residential properties. The road enters Indiana, and the freeway name becomes Borman Expressway.

=== Services ===
The IDOT operates five rest areas and ISTHA operates one Oasis in 164 miles (264 km) of Interstate Highway. Along I-80, there are three locations that have facilities for each direction of traffic. Parking areas are divided so passenger automobiles are separated from semi trucks. Common among most of the rest stops are restrooms, payphones with TDD capabilities, weather information, picnic areas, and vending machines. The eastbound rest area near Rapid City does not allow large trucks and does not have vending machines or TDD capabilities.

The Oasis is the Chicago Southland Lincoln Oasis, located in South Holland. Like most of the other Oasises, this location has several fast-food restaurants, gas stations, convenience stores, visitor centers, and free wireless internet. This Oasis is one of the few with an electric vehicle charging station. The Chicago Southland Lincoln Oasis was originally named Lincoln Oasis, ISTHA added Chicago Southland to the name. The change was made to better represent the area around the Oasis. The Oasis's name was changed in February 2006, changing the name officially to the Chicago Southland Lincoln Oasis.

== History ==
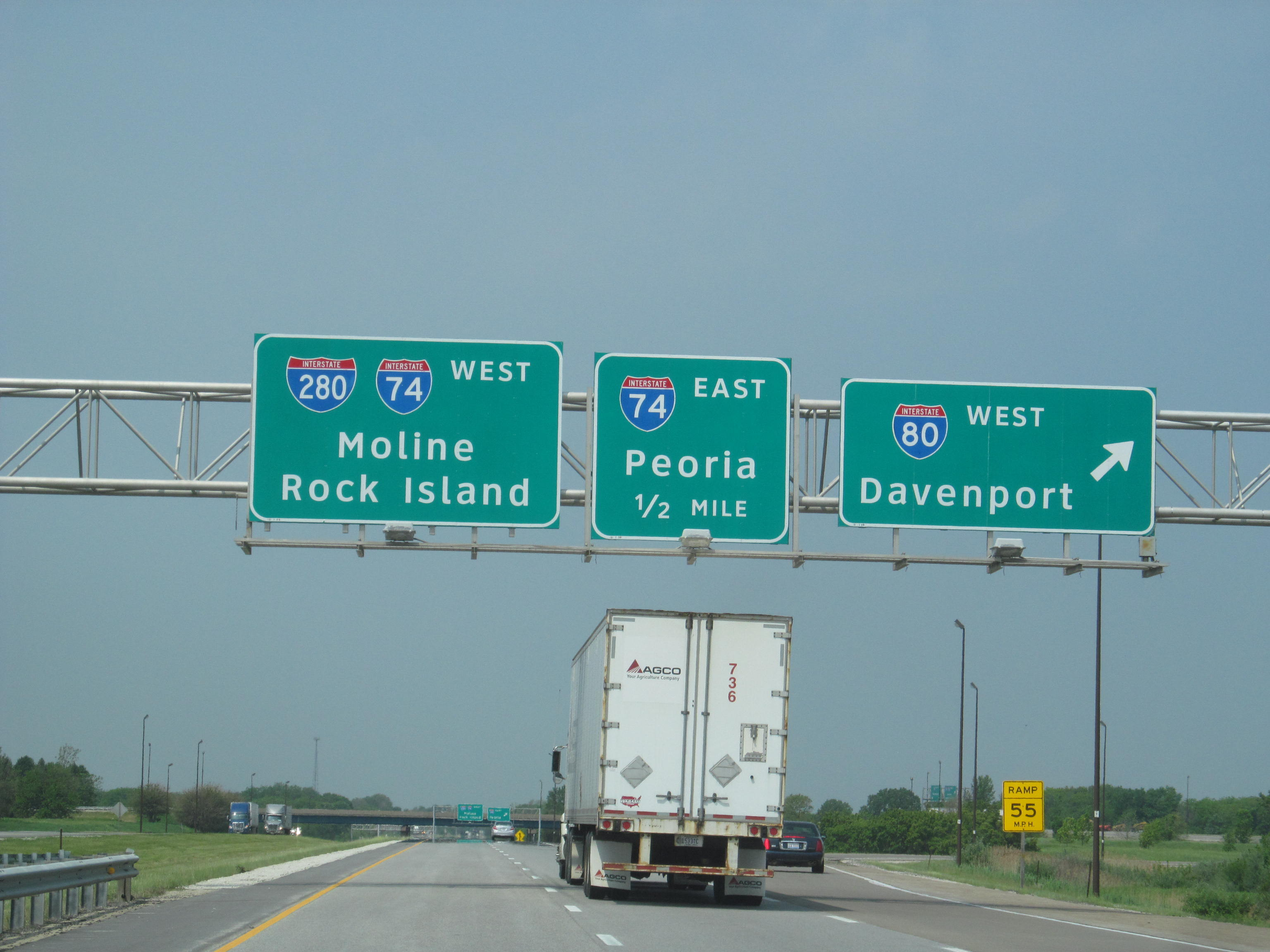
I-80 in Colona, Illinois

In 1917, there were many sections of named highways which made up the route that current I-80 takes through Illinois. The first was the Blue Line. It was routed between Rock Island and Princeton. The second section was named Sunset Trail, and it traveled between Princeton and Ottawa, passing through LaSalle. Illinois Valley Trail went from Ottawa to Orland Park. From Orland Park to the Indiana state line, no named highway was available. The first state highways along the I-80 corridor were numbered IL 7 from the Rock Island east to the Orland Park area and IL 53 from Orland Park east to Indiana state line in 1923. The US Numbered Highway System was approved on November 11, 1926, and US 32 was routed between Rock Island and Princeton. East of Princeton, US 32 followed a route closer to current US 34. US 6 was commissioned in Illinois in 1932, replacing US 32 west of Princeton, IL 7 between Princeton and Joliet, and IL 53 from Joliet to the Indiana state line.

Construction of a test track for the Interstate Highway System between Utica and Ottawa began in 1952. The test track had six different segments of roadway, with different types of surfaces. One of the old test tracks can still be seen from I-80. The first section of I-80 to open was the section that is known as the Kingery Expressway, this section open in 1957, as US 6. In October 1958, the test track west of Ottawa opens to testing. The section of I-80 that is concurrent with the Tri-State Tollway was opened in 1958. In November 1960, the testing at the test track was completed. The Interstate opened between IL 71, near Ottawa, and I-55, near Joliet, in 1960. The segment of roadway between IL 23 and IL 71, near Ottawa, open in 1961. In 1962, the highway was extended west to IL 89, near LaSalle, replacing and paralleling the test track most of the way to Utica. Also in 1962, another section of road open between US 67 and IL 78. During 1964 and 1965, the gap between IL 78 and IL 89 was completed and opened to traffic. The north–south section of I-80 in Illinois was open in 1967. The last section of I-80 to open was the section between I-55 and the Tri-State Tollway, with it opening 1968.

In 1990 and 1991, IDOT proposed rerouting I-80 onto present day I-280, with current I-80 becoming I-74. IDOT listed safety concerns and cost savings as reasons to reroute I-80. Iowa officials challenged the reroute of I-80 and the routes of I-74 and I-80 never changed.

Between 1991 and 1992, the section of I-80 that is concurrent with the Tri-State Tollway was reconstructed and widened to eight-lanes.

The Des Plaines River Bridge was reconstructed in 1998.

Between 2003 and 2007, construction to widen the Kingery Expressway was done and the project cost $460 million (equivalent to $668 million in 2024). This was the first major project on the Kingery Expressway since it was opened in the 1950s.

In early 2011, IDOT began construction to widen a section of freeway to six-lanes between US 30 and US 45. This project had an opening ceremony on October 24, 2012, with the project costing $26 million (equivalent to $35 million in 2024).

In 2020, the Illinois Department of Transportation began a study, which is expected to cost $20,000, to replace the bridge. The plan from 2020 to 2025 is to spend $304.5 million on the bridge. By 2025, Illinois is expected to spend $23 billion on concrete, as well as fixing and expanding 4,200 miles (6,800 km) of roadways and 9 million square feet (836,000 m²) of bridge decks. The Illinois department will be the lead agency on the project with the state of Iowa sharing in the costs. It was announced in late October 2024, that the new bridge will include two spans in place of the original single span. A separate multi-use pathway for bicyclists and pedestrians will be included as well as upgrades to the interchanges at both ends of the bridge. Construction is expected to begin in 2028 and last four years. On March 18, 2021, a plan was announced by Chad Pregracke to repurpose the Fred Schwengel Memorial Bridge into a national park. The proposal gives an estimate that taxpayers would save 30 to 40 million dollars by foregoing the demolition of the bridge. The project would allow both bison and pedestrians to roam freely between Iowa and Illinois and also place a visitor center directly on the bridge.

== Exit list ==
County	Location	mi	km	Exit	Destinations	Notes
Mississippi River		0.00	0.00		I-80 west – Davenport, Des Moines	Continuation into Iowa
Mississippi River		0.00	0.00	Fred Schwengel Memorial Bridge; Illinois–Iowa state line		
Rock Island	Hampton Township	0.36	0.58	1	IL 84 / Great River Road (2nd Avenue) – East Moline, Savanna	
Rock Island	East Moline	3.49	5.62	4A	IL 5 west / IL 92 west – Silvis, East Moline	Eastern terminus of IL 5
Rock Island	East Moline	3.49	5.62	4B	I-88 east / IL 92 east / IL 110 (CKC) east (Ronald Reagan Memorial Highway) – Sterling, Rock Falls	Western end of IL 110 (CKC) concurrency; western terminus and exits 1A-B on I-88
Henry	Colona	6.60	10.62	7	Colona	
Henry	Colona	8.87	14.27	9	US 6 (Grand Army of the Republic Highway)	
Henry	Colona Township	10.11	16.27	—	I-74 west / I-280 west – Moline, Rock Island, Quad City Airport I-74 east / IL 110 (CKC) west – Peoria, Galesburg	Big X; eastern end of IL 110 (CKC) concurrency; eastern terminus of I-280; no exit numbers
Henry	Geneseo	19.24	30.96	19	IL 82 (Oakwood Avenue) – Cambridge, Geneseo	
Henry	Atkinson	27.03	43.50	27	Atkinson, Galva	
Henry	Annawan	33.26	53.53	33	IL 78 (Canal Street) – Prophetstown, Kewanee, Annawan	
Bureau	Concord Township	44.85	72.18	45	IL 40 – Sterling, Peoria	
Bureau	Princeton	56.42	90.80	56	IL 26 (Main Street) – Princeton, Dixon	
Bureau	Selby Township	60.90	98.01	61	I-180 south – Hennepin	Northern terminus of I-180
Bureau	Ladd	70.04	112.72	70	IL 89 (Main Street) – Ladd, Spring Valley	
LaSalle	Peru	73.53	118.34	73	Plank Road	
LaSalle	Peru	74.91	120.56	75	IL 251 (East 2nd Road) – Peru, Mendota, LaSalle	
LaSalle	La Salle	76.55	123.20	77	IL 351 (St. Vincent Avenue) – LaSalle	
LaSalle	LaSalle–Dimmick township line	78.54	126.40	79	I-39 / US 51 – Rockford, Bloomington–Normal	I-39 exit 59; signed as exits 79A (south) and 79B (north).
LaSalle	North Utica	81.10	130.52	81	IL 178 (East 8th Road) – Utica, LaSalle	Starved Rock State Park, Matthiessen State Park
LaSalle	Ottawa	90.28	145.29	90	IL 23 (Columbus Street) – DeKalb, Ottawa, Streator	
LaSalle	Rutland Township	93.26	150.09	93	IL 71 – Ottawa, Oswego, Yorkville	
LaSalle	Rutland–Miller township line	97.03	156.15	97	East 24th Road/Rutland St – Marseilles	
Grundy	Erienna Township	104.78	168.63	105	Seneca Road to US 6 – Seneca	
Grundy	Morris	112.01	180.26	112	IL 47 (Division Street) – Yorkville, Morris	
Grundy	Saratoga–Aux Sable township line	115.73	186.25	116	Brisbin Road to US 6	
Grundy–Kendall county line	Minooka	121.63	195.74	122	Ridge Road – Minooka	
Will	Channahon	126.16	203.03	126	I-55 (Barack Obama Presidential Expressway) – St. Louis, Chicago	I-55 exit 250; signed as exits 126A (south) and 126B (north)
Will	Joliet	127.74	205.58	127	Houbolt Road	Hollywood Casino; Rebuilt from a diamond interchange to a diverging-diamond interchange (DDI) in 2024
Will	Joliet	130.54	210.08	130	IL 7 (Larkin Avenue) – Rockdale	
Will	Joliet	131.92	212.30	131	Center Street, Meadow Avenue – Rockdale	Center Street becomes Meadow Avenue immediately south of interchange; no eastbound exit to or westbound entrance from Meadow Avenue; to US 6
Des Plaines River				Des Plaines River Bridge		
Will	Joliet	132.78	213.69	132	Historic US 66 / US 52 / IL 53 (Chicago Street) – Preston Heights, Wilmington, Manhattan	Signed as exits 132A (east/south) and 132B (west/north) eastbound; Downtown Joliet, Harrah's Casino, Chicagoland Speedway
Will	Joliet	133.25	214.45	133	Richards Street	
Will	Joliet Township	134.82	216.97	134	Briggs Street – Manhattan	
Will	New Lenox	137.63	221.49	137	US 30 / Lincoln Highway (Maple Street) – Joliet, New Lenox	
Will	New Lenox	140.00	225.31	140	I-355 Toll north (Veterans Memorial Tollway) to US 6 (Southwest Highway) – Rockford	I-355 exit 0
Will	Frankfort Township	145.61	234.34	145	US 45 (La Grange Road) – Mokena, Orland Park	
Will–Cook county line	Tinley Park	148.84	239.53	148	IL 43 (Harlem Avenue)	Signed as exits 148A (south) and 148B (north)
Cook	Country Club Hills	151.69	244.12	151	I-57 to I-294 Toll north – Memphis, Chicago, Wisconsin	Signed as exits 151A (south) and 151B (north); I-57 exit 345
Cook	Hazel Crest	154.26	248.26	154	Kedzie Avenue	Eastbound exit and westbound entrance; last free exit eastbound
Cook	Hazel Crest			Western end of Toll Road		
Cook	Hazel Crest	154.95	249.37	155	I-294 Toll north (Tri-State Tollway) – Wisconsin	Western end of I-294 concurrency; I-294 exit 5; tollway concurrency uses I-294's exit numbers
Cook	Hazel Crest			Tri-State Tollway Barrier		
Cook	East Hazel Crest	156.11	251.23	4	Dixie Highway	Eastbound exit and westbound entrance
Cook	East Hazel Crest	157.58	253.60	2	IL 1 (Halsted Street)	Signed exits 2A (north) and 2B (south); toll on northound exit and southbound entrance
Cook	South Holland	159.37	256.48	Chicago Southland Lincoln Oasis		
Cook	South Holland–Thornton Township line	160.40	258.14	0	I-94 west (Bishop Ford Freeway) – Chicago IL 394 south (Calumet Expressway) – Danville	Southern terminus of Tri-State Tollway; eastbound exit and westbound entrance; I-94 east exit 74A
Cook	Lansing	161.62	260.10	161	US 6 west / IL 83 (Torrence Avenue)	Western end of US 6 concurrency; last free exit westbound
Cook	Lansing	162.51	261.53	160	I-94 west (Bishop Ford Freeway) – Chicago IL 394 south (Calumet Expressway) – Danville I-294 Toll ends	Western end of I-94 concurrency; westbound exit and eastbound entrance; southern terminus of I-294; western end of Kingery Expressway
Cook	Lansing	163.41	262.98		I-80 east / I-94 east / US 6 east (Borman Expressway) – Toledo, Detroit	Continuation into Indiana; eastern end of Kingery Expressway
1.000 mi = 1.609 km; 1.000 km = 0.621 mi: Concurrency terminus; Electronic toll collection; Incomplete access; Route transition

== See also ==
Interstate 80
Previous state: Iowa	Illinois	Next state: Indiana
