= Illinois Route 26 =

North-south state highway in Illinois, US

Illinois Route 26
- IL 26 highlighted in red

Route information
- Maintained by IDOT
- Length: 139.35 mi (224.26 km)
- Existed: November 5, 1918–present

Major junctions
- South end: IL 116 in East Peoria
- I-180 / IL 71 in Hennepin; I-180 in Princeton; I-180 in Princeton; US 6 / US 34 in Princeton; I-80 in Princeton; US 30 near Dixon I-88 Toll / IL 110 (CKC) in Dixon; US 52 in Dixon; US 52 near Polo; US 20 in Freeport
- North end: WIS 69 in Orangeville

Location
- Country: United States
- State: Illinois
- Counties: Tazewell, Woodford, Marshall, Putnam, Bureau, Lee, Ogle, Stephenson

Highway system
- Illinois State Highway System; Interstate; US; State; Tollways; Scenic
← IL 25	→ IL 29

Illinois Route 26 (IL 26, Illinois 26) is a north–south state highway in central and north-central Illinois. It runs from Illinois Route 116 just north of East Peoria to Highway 69 at the Wisconsin border near Orangeville. This is a distance of 139.35 miles (224.26 km).

== Route description ==
Illinois 26 is a two to four lane surface highway for the majority of its length. Its southern terminus is just one mile (1.6 km) north of the McClugage Bridge carrying U.S. Route 150 into Peoria.

Illinois 26 mostly follows the east bank of the Illinois River until it crosses the river at Hennepin. It runs concurrent with Illinois Route 29, its Illinois River west bank counterpart, at Bureau and with U.S. Route 52 near Freeport.

== History ==
SBI Route 26 originally ran from Freeport to Polo, on part of current IL-26. In 1937, IL-26 was extended from Freeport to the WI state line, in place of IL-74, and extended from Polo to Bureau along US-52 to Dixon, and replacing IL-89 from Dixon to Bureau. In 1969, it was extended south to East Peoria replacing IL-87.

In northern Stephenson County, IL 26 originally ran through downtown Orangeville and the unincorporated community of Oneco. In 1990, it was rerouted onto a new at-grade bypass around the village, decreasing travel time.

IL-26 was rerouted onto the nearby I-180 bridge over the Illinois River near Hennepin during the 1990s. The older IL-26 bridge, half a mile south of I-180, was removed after 1999. the old approaches are now local roads, used mainly as access to riverside industries on both banks.

== Major intersections ==
County	Location	mi	km	Destinations	Notes
Tazewell	East Peoria	0.0	0.0	IL 116 / Illinois River Road south	South end of Illinois River Road overlap
Marshall	Lacon	24.7	39.8	IL 17 (Fifth Street) – Wyoming, Wenona, Business District	
Marshall	Henry	31.1	50.1	IL 18 west – Henry	South end of IL 18 overlap
Putnam	Henry	31.7	51.0	IL 18 east – Streator	North end of IL 18 overlap
Putnam	Hennepin	43.0	69.2	IL 71 east / Illinois River Road north – Granville	Interchange; north end of Illinois River Road overlap; south end of I-180 overlap
Bureau	Hennepin	45.5	73.2	I-180 north – Princeton	Interchange; north end of I-180 overlap; northbound exit and southbound entrance
Bureau	Leepertown Township	46.5	74.8	IL 29 south / Illinois River Road / Ronald Reagan Trail – Peoria	South end of IL 29 / Illinois River Road / Ronald Reagan Trail overlap
Bureau	Bureau Junction	47.6	76.6	IL 29 north / Illinois River Road – Spring Valley, Depue	North end of IL 29 overlap; south end of Illinois River Road Princeton Spur
Bureau	Leepertown Township	49.9	80.3	I-180 to I-80 – Hennepin	Interchange
Bureau	Princeton	55.1	88.7	US 6 east (Peru Street) – Peru	South end of US 6 overlap
Bureau	Princeton	55.8	89.8	US 6 west / US 34 west (Peru Street) / Main Street – Wyanet, Kewanee, Tiskilwa	North end of US 6 overlap; south end of US 34 overlap
Bureau	Princeton	56.7	91.2	US 34 east (Elm Place)	North end of US 34 overlap
Bureau	Princeton	57.8	93.0	I-80 – Moline, Rock Island, Joliet	I-80 exit 56
Bureau	Ohio	68.5	110.2	IL 92 (Green River Road) / Ronald Reagan Trail Tampico Spur – Walnut, Mendota	
Lee	East Grove Township	73.7	118.6	CR 12 (Maytown Road)	
Lee	South Dixon Township	82.7	133.1	US 30 – Morrison, Aurora	
Lee	South Dixon Township	83.7	134.7	CR 31 east (Haldena Road)	
Lee	Dixon	87.2	140.3	I-88 Toll / IL 110 (CKC) (Ronald Reagan Memorial Tollway) – Chicago, Moline	I-88 exit 54
Lee	Dixon	88.4	142.3	US 52 east / Lincoln Highway east (7th Street) to IL 38 – Rochelle, Mendota, Airport	South end of US 52 / Lincoln Highway overlap
Lee	Dixon	88.8	142.9	IL 2 north (2nd Street) / Rock River Trail north – Rockford	South end of IL 2 / Rock River Trail overlap
Lee	Dixon	89.2	143.6	IL 2 south / Lincoln Highway west / Rock River Trail south (Everett Street) – Sterling	North end of IL 2 / Lincoln Highway / Rock River Trail overlap
Lee	Dixon	90.3	145.3	CR 38 north (4th Avenue / Lowell Park Road) / Ronald Reagan Trail north – Lowell Park, White Pines Forest State Park	North end of Ronald Reagan Trail overlap
Ogle	Polo	103.0	165.8	US 52 west – Savanna	North end of US 52 overlap
Ogle	Polo	106.1	170.8	IL 64 east – Mount Morris, Oregon	South end of IL 64 overlap
Ogle	Polo	106.5	171.4	IL 64 west – Savanna	North end of IL 64 overlap
Ogle	Forreston	111.7	179.8	IL 72 east (Walnut Avenue) – Byron	South end of IL 72 overlap
Ogle	Forreston	115.8	186.4	IL 72 west – Shannon	North end of IL 72 overlap
Stephenson	Freeport	125.5	202.0	IL 75 east (West Douglas Street) – Rockton	
Stephenson	Freeport	125.7	202.3	US 20 Bus. (Galena Avenue)	
Stephenson	Freeport	127.2	204.7	US 20 (Freeport Bypass) – Galena, Rockford	Interchange
Stephenson	Orangeville	139.35	224.26	WIS 69 north – Monroe	Wisconsin state line
1.000 mi = 1.609 km; 1.000 km = 0.621 mi: Concurrency terminus
