= Big X (interchange) =

- Interactive map of Big X

Location
- Colona, Illinois
- Coordinates: 41°26′22″N 90°19′47″W
- Roads at junction: I-74; I-80; I-280; IL 110 (CKC)

Construction
- Type: Cloverleaf interchange
- Maintained by: Illinois Department of Transportation

The Big X is the junction of three Interstate Highways, I-74, I-80, and I-280, near Colona, Illinois. The cloverleaf interchange is particularly confusing for I-74 and I-80 traffic because someone wishing to stay on either route must exit their highway to connect to the other highway.

In the 1990s, the Illinois Department of Transportation (IDOT) petitioned the American Association of State Highway and Transportation Officials (AASHTO), the body which approves Interstate Highway route numbering, to switch the I-74 and I-80 designations around the Quad Cities to simplify the Big X. Iowa Department of Transportation (Iowa DOT) officials did not submit an equal route renumbering proposal, so the route numbers were not switched.

== Description ==
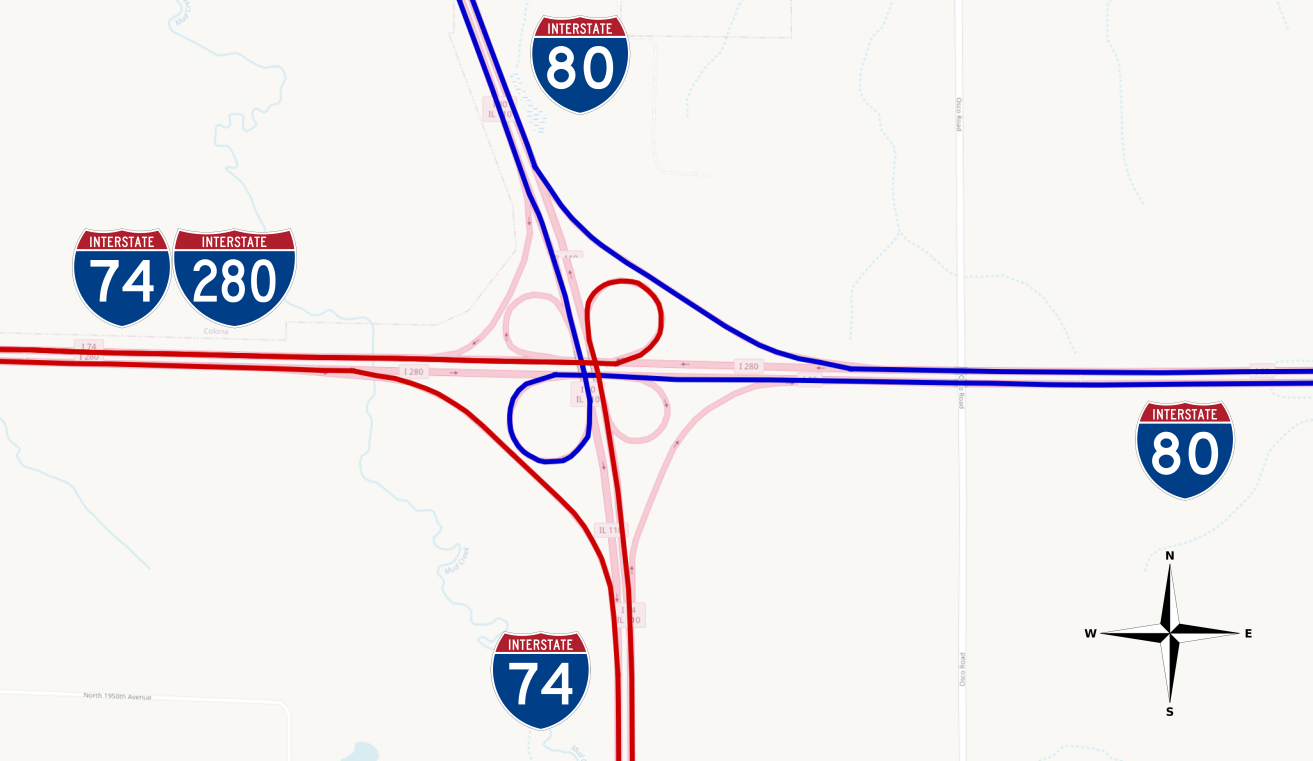
Summary of traffic movements at the Big X; I-74 is highlighted in red, I-80 in blue

The Big X is located southeast of the Quad Cities metropolitan area, near Colona, Illinois. It is a simple cloverleaf interchange between north–south and east–west freeways. Traffic on both I-74 and I-80 must exit their respective highways in order to continue on their routes. On eastbound I-74 and westbound I-80, traffic takes a slip road to make a 90-degree turn. Westbound I-74 and eastbound I-80 traffic takes a cloverleaf ramp in order to make a 270-degree turn.

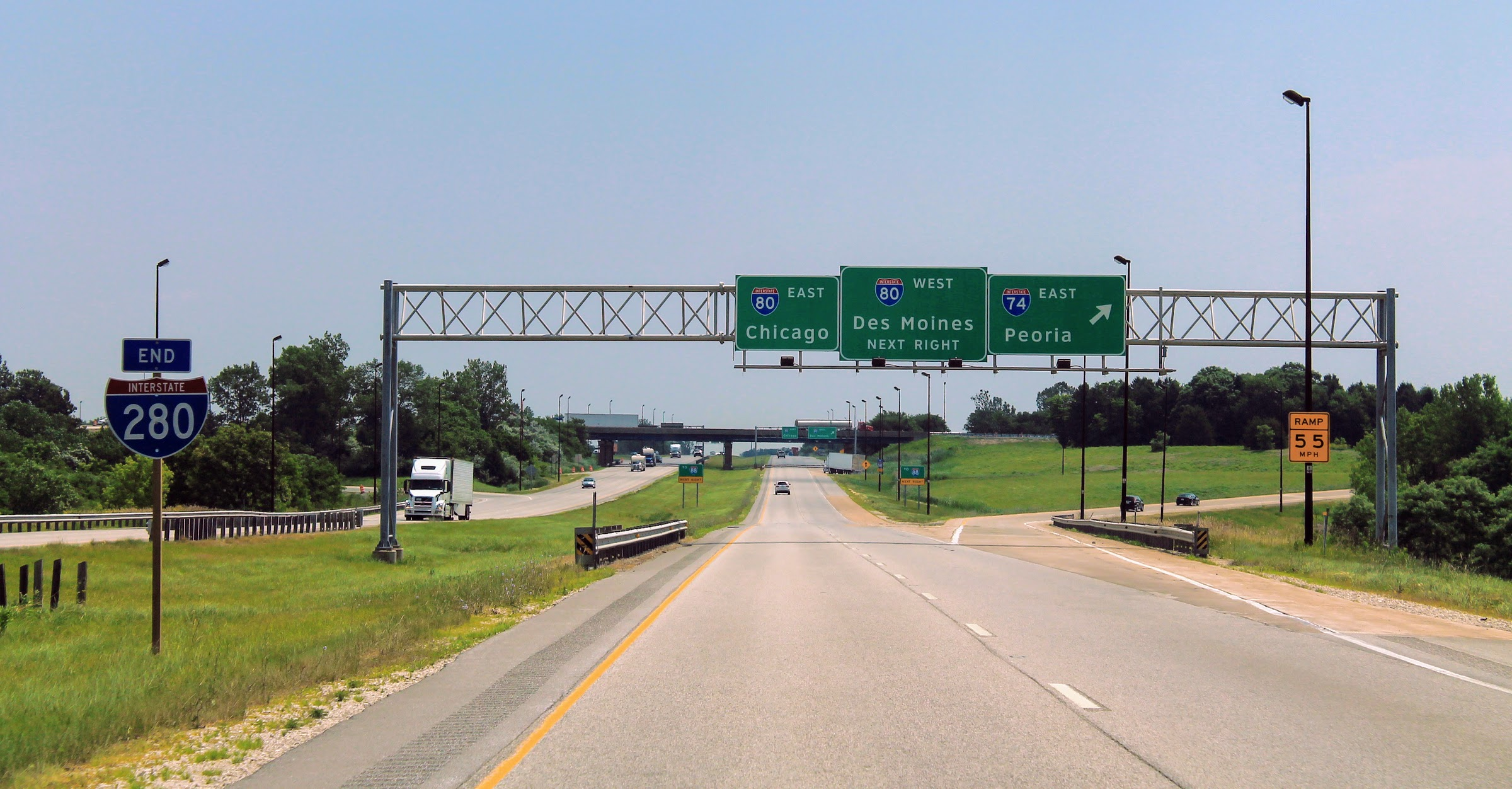
The Big X from the west

== History ==
Before construction of the Interstate Highway System in the Quad Cities, Illinois and Iowa highway officials disagreed on the proposed route numbering. The Illinois officials proposed overlapping I-74 and I-80 from their junction at the Big X through the heart of the Quad Cities to where I-74 ends in Davenport today. The central route would be flanked by I-280 to the west and I-274 to the east. Iowa officials proposed the route numbering that is in use today. In the mid-1970s, Illinois transportation officials again attempted to renumber the Interstate Highways through the Big X. They stated that renumbering the highways would reduce the usage of exit and entrance ramps thus making the interchange safer. In their proposal, I-280 along the southern edge of the Quad Cities would have become I-80 and the present I-80 would have been renumbered I-74. Again, Iowa officials did not support the plan. The group from Iowa cited a reduction in accidents from 1973 to 1975 that coincided with the application of the 55-mile-per-hour (90 km/h) national speed limit as proof that safety had improved at the interchange.

In the early 1990s, the Illinois DOT proposed redesigning the interchange in order to reduce some confusion for drivers. The proposal was estimated to cost $18 million (equivalent to $37 million in 2024). The idea to renumber the Interstates returned shortly thereafter with the backing of the Illinois Quad Cities Chamber of Commerce. In this proposal, I-74 would remain unchanged while I-80 would become "I-80 North" and I-280 would become "I-80 South" similar to the I-35 splits in Dallas–Fort Worth and Minneapolis–St. Paul. City councils in Milan and Rock Island backed the plan. One alderman in Moline even sought to use city funds to help with the renumbering effort. In total, sixteen Illinois communities supported the plan; there was no support from the Iowa side. Business leaders in Iowa thought the plan would pull traffic away from businesses that popped up along I-80. Another wrinkle in Illinois's plan was that the American Association of State Highway and Transportation Officials (AASHTO) would no longer approve directionally-split route numbers because they were found to be confusing to drivers. The plan was scuttled when the Iowa DOT did not also send an application to AASHTO when Illinois DOT applied for renumbering. Opponents of the renumbering plan reviewed statistics of crashes at the Big X and discovered that 28 of the 137 accidents involved I-80 traffic. Therefore, in their opinion, the interchange was entirely deficient and simply renumbering the highways would not alleviate its issues. The Federal Highway Administration (FHWA) sided with Iowa in July 1993 by deciding to not renumber the highways at the Big X, effectively ending the bid from Illinois officials.

The Illinois highway budget in 1996 included $6 million for exit and entrance ramps at the Big X (equivalent to $11 million in 2024). The first ramp to be rebuilt was the west-to-north ramp connecting two legs of westbound I-80. The new ramp allowed traffic to increase speeds from 45 to 55 mph (70 to 90 km/h) when compared to the old ramp. Continued work was contingent on Illinois receiving $6 million from the federal government.
