= Edward Pulsifer House =

Historic house in Illinois, United States

- U.S. National Register of Historic Places
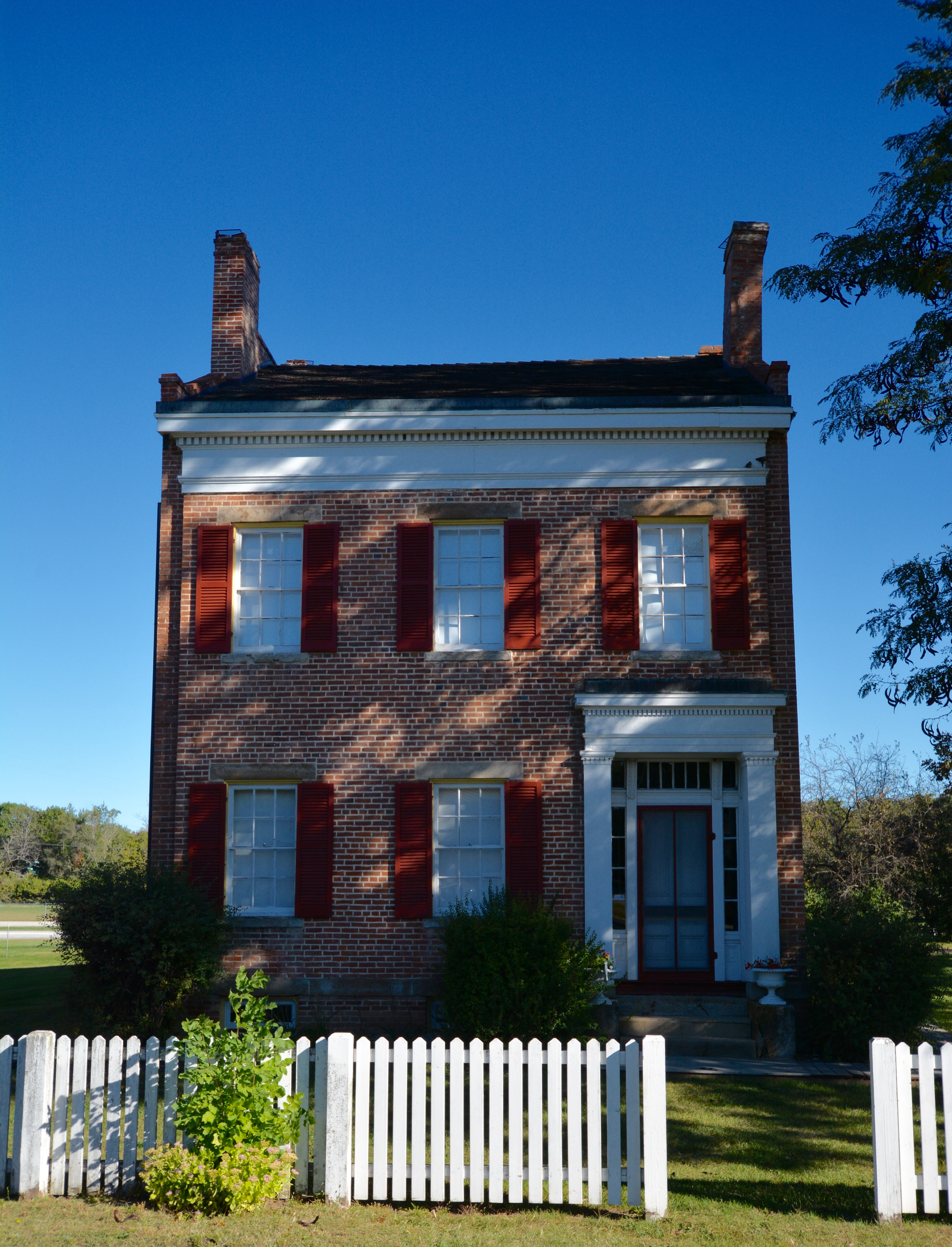

- Location within Illinois Location within the United States
- Location: IL 71, Hennepin, Illinois
- Coordinates: 41°15′27″N 89°20′27″W
- Area: less than one acre
- Built: 1844
- Architectural style: Federal
- NRHP reference No.: 79000864
- Added to NRHP: September 4, 1979

The Edward Pulsifer House is a historic house located on Illinois Route 71 in Hennepin, Illinois. Edward Pulsifer, a prominent Hennepin businessman, had the house built in 1844, four years after he came to the city. Pulsifer began his enterprise by running a general store with his brother; his later ventures included local real estate and a shipping business on the Illinois River. His house is designed in the Federal style and is one of Putnam County's best remaining examples of the style. The 2 1/2-story brick house is topped by a gable roof; the brick in the gables forms a projecting coping at the top, and each gable has paired chimneys at its peak. Brick parapets connect the pairs of chimneys, a stylistic element often seen in Federal architecture in Illinois. The entrance and the roof line feature matching dentillated entablatures; the entrance also features a transom, sidelights, and flanking pilasters.

The house was added to the National Register of Historic Places on September 4, 1979.
