= Leepertown Township, Bureau County, Illinois =

Leepertown Township
- Township
- Location in Bureau County

- Bureau County's location in Illinois
- Coordinates: 41°17′02″N 89°21′36″W
- Country: United States
- State: Illinois
- County: Bureau
- Established: November 6, 1849

Area
  - Total: 18.45 sq mi (47.8 km^{2})
  - Land: 15.63 sq mi (40.5 km^{2})
  - Water: 2.82 sq mi (7.3 km^{2}) 15.28%
- Elevation: 446 ft (136 m)

Population (2020)
  - Total: 333
  - Density: 21.3/sq mi (8.23/km^{2})
- Time zone: UTC-6 (CST)
  - Summer (DST): UTC-5 (CDT)
- ZIP codes: 61315, 61322, 61356, 61368
- FIPS code: 17-011-42665

Leepertown Township is one of twenty-five townships in Bureau County, Illinois, USA. As of the 2020 census, its population was 333 and it contained 164 housing units. Leepertown Township changed its name from Leipertown Township on an unknown date.

== Geography ==
According to the 2010 census, the township has a total area of 18.45 square miles (47.8 km^{2}), of which 15.63 square miles (40.5 km^{2}) (or 84.72%) is land and 2.82 square miles (7.3 km^{2}) (or 15.28%) is water.

=== Cities ===
- Bureau Junction
- De Pue (northeast edge)

=== Cemeteries ===
The township contains Greenwood Cemetery.

=== Major highways ===
- Interstate 180
- Illinois Route 26
- Illinois Route 29

=== Rivers ===
- Illinois River

=== Lakes ===
- Goose Lake
- Hickory Ridge Lake
- Lower Spring Lake
- Lake Rawson
- Spring Lake

== Demographics ==
As of the 2020 census there were 333 people, 91 households, and 61 families residing in the township. The population density was 18.03 inhabitants per square mile (6.96/km^{2}). There were 164 housing units at an average density of 8.88 per square mile (3.43/km^{2}). The racial makeup of the township was 86.19% White, 0.00% African American, 0.30% Native American, 0.30% Asian, 0.00% Pacific Islander, 1.20% from other races, and 12.01% from two or more races. Hispanic or Latino of any race were 9.01% of the population.

There were 91 households, out of which 25.30% had children under the age of 18 living with them, 40.66% were married couples living together, 12.09% had a female householder with no spouse present, and 32.97% were non-families. 14.30% of all households were made up of individuals, and 12.10% had someone living alone who was 65 years of age or older. The average household size was 2.95 and the average family size was 3.10.

The township's age distribution consisted of 18.7% under the age of 18, 13.1% from 18 to 24, 23.5% from 25 to 44, 32.8% from 45 to 64, and 11.9% who were 65 years of age or older. The median age was 39.8 years. For every 100 females, there were 100.0 males. For every 100 females age 18 and over, there were 83.2 males.

The median income for a household in the township was $67,813, and the median income for a family was $72,250. Males had a median income of $41,250 versus $24,500 for females. The per capita income for the township was $27,346. About 0.0% of families and 8.5% of the population were below the poverty line, including 22.0% of those under age 18 and 3.1% of those age 65 or over.

Historical population
Census	Pop.	Note	%±
2010	364		—
2020	333		−8.5%
US Decennial Census

== School districts ==
- Depue Community Unit School District 103

== Political districts ==
- Illinois's 11th congressional district
- State House District 76
- State Senate District 38
