= Interstate 280 (Iowa–Illinois) =

Highway in Illinois and Iowa

Interstate 280
- Quad Cities Beltway
- I-280 highlighted in red

Route information
- Auxiliary route of I-80
- Maintained by Iowa DOT and IDOT
- Length: 26.98 mi (43.42 km)
- NHS: Entire route

Major junctions
- West end: I-80 / US 6 / US 61 in Davenport, IA
- US 6 in Davenport, IA; US 61 in Davenport, IA; I-74 / US 6 in Moline, IL
- East end: I-74 / I-80 near Colona, IL

Location
- Country: United States
- States: Iowa; Illinois
- Counties: Iowa; Scott; Illinois; Rock Island; Henry

Highway system
- Interstate Highway System; Main; Auxiliary; Suffixed; Business; Future
← US 275	IA	→ Iowa 281
← I-270	IL	→ I-290

Interstate 280 (I-280) is an auxiliary Interstate Highway that makes up the western and southern portions of the beltway around the Quad Cities of Illinois and Iowa. The freeway starts at I-80 near Davenport, Iowa, and ends at I-80 near Colona, Illinois; its eastern part runs concurrent with I-74 to return to I-80. I-280 forms the southern part of a circle around the Quad Cities as well as forming part of a bypass (along with I-80) for US Route 61 (US 61) around Davenport. This road is 26.98 miles (43.42 km) long.

== Route description ==
I-280 begins at a directional T interchange with I-80 on the northwestern outskirts of Davenport. US 6 and US 61 join I-280 from opposite directions of I-80 at the interchange. It heads south along the western edge of Davenport. At the Kimberly Road exit, US 6 splits off to the east. It continues south for four miles (6.4 km), crossing Duck Creek, toward a diamond interchange with Scott County Road F65 (CR F65), which becomes Locust Street in Davenport.

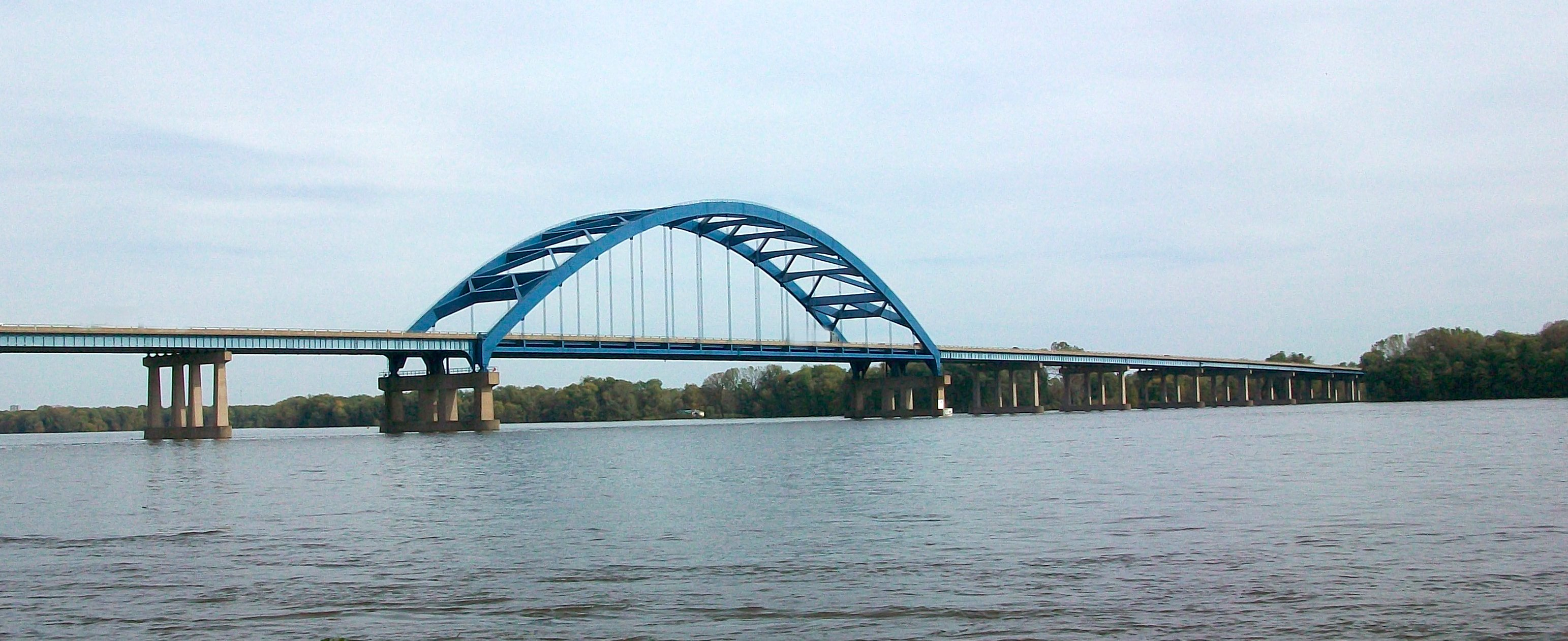
I-280 crosses the Mississippi River over the Baker Bridge.

Further south, I-280 passes the 620-acre (250 ha) West Lake Park. South of West Lake Park, US 61 splits away from the Interstate on its way toward Muscatine. In the other direction, US 61 Business (US 61 Bus) heads toward the Davenport riverfront. South of US 61, I-280 curves to the southeast towards the Mississippi River. It drops into the river valley and meets Iowa Highway 22 (Iowa 22). It continues southeast and crosses the river via the Sergeant John F. Baker Jr. Bridge.

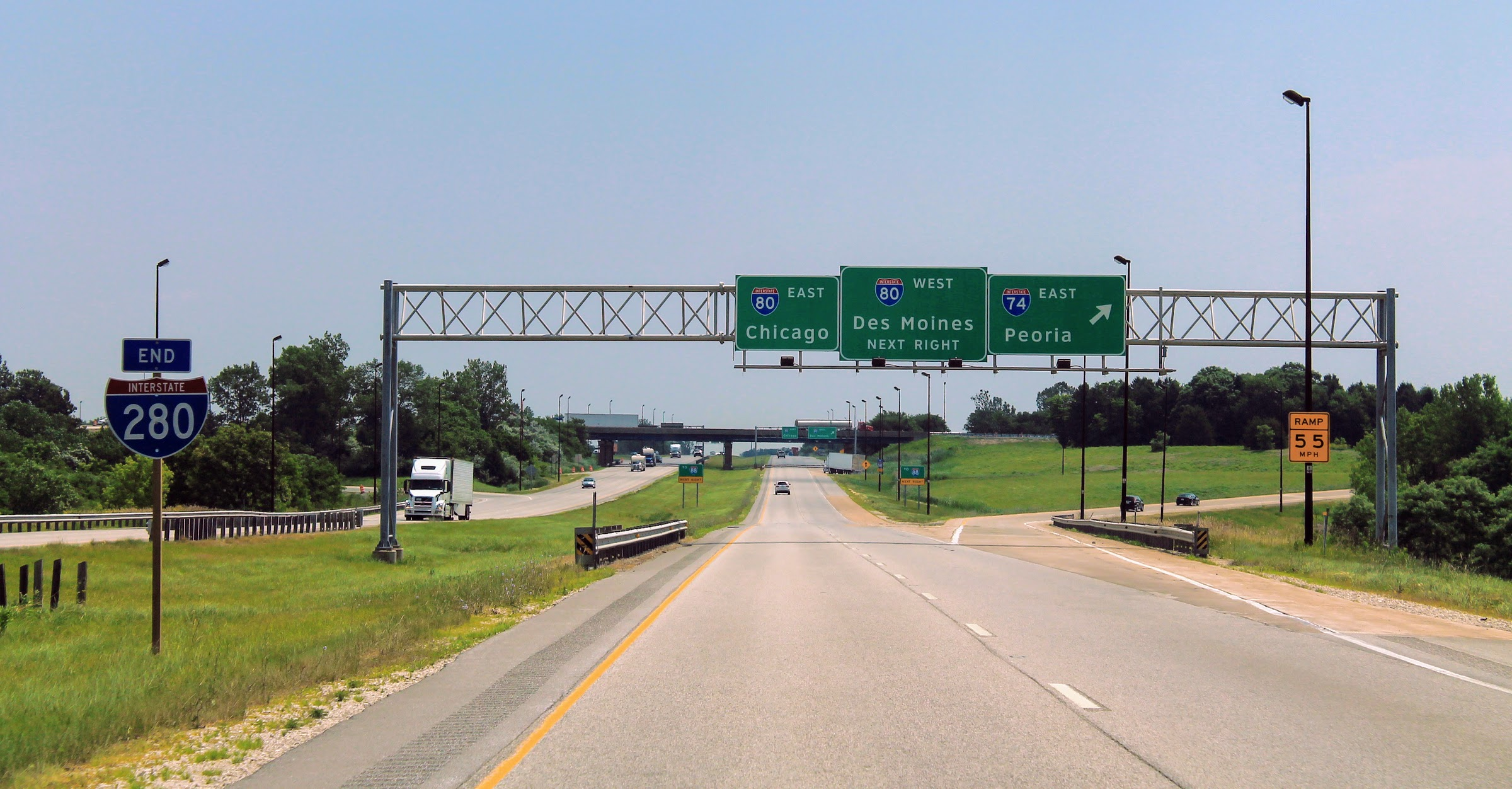
Eastern terminus at the Big X interchange

In Illinois, I-280 runs for 17.6 miles (28.3 km). It runs southeast from the Baker Bridge to Milan, where it parallels the Rock River. I-280 joins with I-74 at Quad Cities International Airport; this concurrency continues for 9.4 miles (15.1 km) before terminating at the I-74/I-80 interchange.

On the southeast corner of the Quad Cities (in Illinois), I-280 heading east ends and becomes I-80 while I-80 heads south from LeClaire, Rapids City, and Port Byron. I-80 heading south becomes I-74 which (after going through the center of the Quad Cities) hooks up with I-280. This exchange is called the Big X.

== History ==
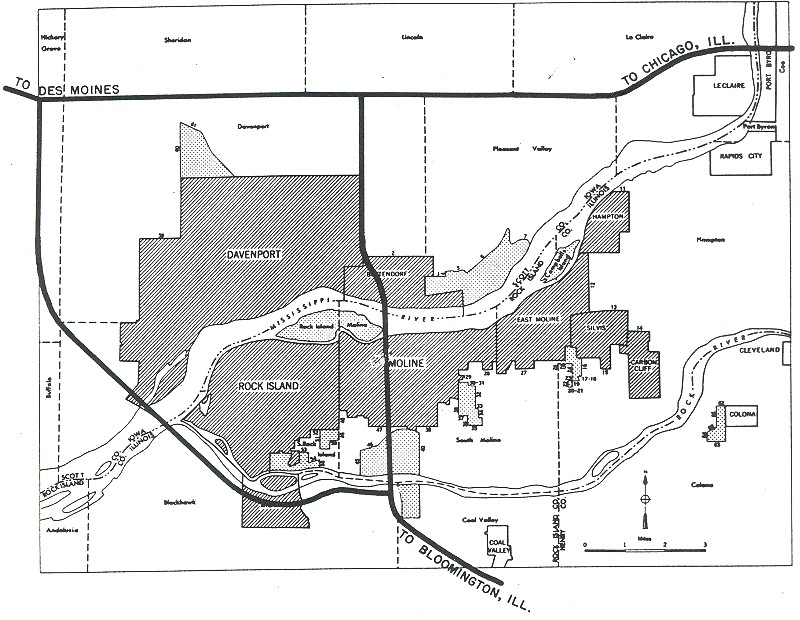
The original plan of I-280 matches the western half of the route today.

I-280 has been at the center of a few debates regarding its routing. In the early 1990s, the state of Illinois suggested, via American Association of State Highway and Transportation Officials (AASHTO) and Intermodal Surface Transportation Efficiency Act (ISTEA) hearings, swapping the I-80 and I-280 designations around the Quad Cities. The plan would have also changed I-74 to I-174. This was challenged by the state of Iowa, and the idea was dropped.

One of the reasons Illinois pursued the matter was due to the configuration of the eastern terminus of I-280; as a simple cloverleaf interchange, through I-80 traffic (along the north and east branches) was required to exit on both directions. Through I-74 traffic (along the west and south branches) is also required to exit on both directions. I-280 runs due west from the interchange.

== Exit list ==
State	County	Location	mi	km	Exit	Destinations	Notes
Iowa	Scott	Davenport	0.000	0.000		I-80 / US 6 west / US 61 north – Des Moines, Chicago	Western end of US 6 / US 61 overlap
Iowa	Scott	Davenport	0.824	1.326	1	US 6 east / CR F58 west (Kimberly Road) – Walcott	Eastern end of US 6 overlap
Iowa	Scott	Davenport	4.525	7.282	4	CR F65 (Locust Street, 160th Street) – St. Ambrose University	
Iowa	Scott	Davenport	6.558	10.554	6	US 61 south / US 61 Bus. (West River Drive) – Muscatine	Eastern end of US 61 overlap
Iowa	Scott	Davenport	8.304	13.364	8	Iowa 22 / Great River Road (Rockingham Road) – Buffalo	
Mississippi River			9.581	15.419	Sergeant John F. Baker, Jr. Bridge		
Illinois	Rock Island	Rock Island	10.98	17.67	11	IL 92 / Great River Road – Andalusia, Rock Island	Signed as exits 11A (west) and 11B (east)
Illinois	Rock Island	Milan	14.96	24.08	15	Airport Road to US 67 – Milan	
Illinois	Rock Island	Moline	17.79	28.63	18	I-74 west / US 6 to US 150 – Quad City Airport, Moline	Western end of I-74 overlap; signed as exits 18A (US 6 east) and 18B (I-74/US 6 west) eastbound; signed as exits 5A (I-74/US 6 west) and 5B (US 6 east) westbound
Illinois	Henry	Colona	26.98	43.42		I-74 east / IL 110 (CKC) west – Peoria I-80 / IL 110 (CKC) east to I-88 – Des Moines, Chicago	Big X; eastern end of I-74 overlap
1.000 mi = 1.609 km; 1.000 km = 0.621 mi: Concurrency terminus
