= Green Rock, Illinois =

Green Rock
- Neighborhood
- Location of Green Rock within Illinois
- Coordinates: 41°28′23″N 90°21′27″W
- Country: United States
- State: Illinois
- County: Henry
- Time zone: UTC-6 (CST)
  - Summer (DST): UTC-5 (CDT)

Green Rock is a neighborhood of the city of Colona in Henry County, Illinois, United States. Once a separate community, Green Rock was named so because it is the place where the Green River meets up with the Rock River. In 1997, the Cities of Green Rock and Colona merged into one larger city and chose the name Colona. Here is a great blog on what led to the merger. Living History of Illinois
