= Illinois Route 23 =

State highway in northern Illinois, US

Illinois Route 23
- IL 23 highlighted in red

Route information
- Maintained by IDOT
- Length: 122.77 mi (197.58 km)
- Existed: November 5, 1918–present

Major junctions
- South end: IL 116 in Pontiac
- I-55 in Pontiac; US 6 / IL 71 in Ottawa; I-80 in Ottawa; US 52 in Serena; US 34 in Leland; US 30 in Waterman; I-90 Toll in Riley; US 20 in Marengo
- North end: US 14 in Harvard

Location
- Country: United States
- State: Illinois
- Counties: Livingston, LaSalle, DeKalb, McHenry

Highway system
- Illinois State Highway System; Interstate; US; State; Tollways; Scenic
← IL 22	→ I-24

Illinois Route 23 (IL 23) is a north–south state highway in northern Illinois. It runs from IL 116 in Pontiac north to U.S. Route 14 (UL 14) south of Harvard. This is a distance of 122.77 miles (197.58 km). The highway was established in 1918 as one of the original 46 SBI routes. The routing of IL 23 has not changed since its establishment.

== Route description ==
IL 23 is a major arterial route in rural central and north-central Illinois. It is a parallel to the Interstate 39/U.S. Route 51 (I-39/US 51) combination approximately 20 miles (32 km) west. It parallels IL 47 approximately 10 miles (16 km) east.

The road starts near downtown Pontiac and runs as the main highway north, intersecting with I-55 and former US 66. IL 23 continues as a two-lane highway from this point, turning west and running through Cornell. After that, it turns back north to travel through the middle of Streator, where the route splits to follow two different one-way streets (Park and Bloomington streets). IL 23 continues through Grand Ridge to Ottawa, where the road follows 1st Avenue and State Street, to run concurrently with IL 71 across the Illinois River. The highway once again splits into two one-way streets (Columbus and LaSalle streets) through downtown Ottawa, until a block south of its junction with US 6, where IL 71 departs toward the east.

North of Ottawa, IL 23 has a full diamond interchange with I-80. IL 23 has two additional concurrencies with US 34 and US 52, though no notable cities are present between Ottawa and DeKalb. IL 23 runs under I-88 with no interchange, though access is available via Fairview Drive to two parallel roads with interchanges (Peace and Annie Glidden roads). Between DeKalb and Sycamore, IL 23 has four lanes. In Sycamore, IL 23 briefly overlaps IL 64. After one final concurrency at IL 72 near Genoa, IL 23 has an interchange with I-90. It intersects US 20 and the western terminus of IL 176 in Marengo, and terminates south of Harvard at US 14.

== Major intersections ==
County	Location	mi	km	Destinations	Notes
Livingston	Pontiac	0.00	0.00	IL 116 (Howard Street) / Historic US 66 west – Kempton, Minonk	Southern end of Historic US 66 concurrency
Livingston	Pontiac	0.4	0.64	Historic US 66 east	Northern end of Historic US 66 concurrency
Livingston	Pontiac	2.6	4.2	I-55 (Barack Obama Presidential Expressway) – Joliet, Bloomington	I-55 exit 201
Livingston	Cornell	7.4	11.9	IL 170 north (North 1500 East Road) – Seneca	
Livingston	Streator	21.9	35.2	IL 17 (East 3000 North Road) – Oglesby, Toluca	
LaSalle	Streator	26.0	41.8	IL 18 (Bridge Street, Main Street) – Lacon, Blackstone	
LaSalle	Ottawa	41.3	66.5	IL 71 west (Hitt Street) – Hennepin	Southern end of IL 71 concurrency
LaSalle	Ottawa	41.4	66.6	Ottawa Bridge over the Illinois River	
LaSalle	Ottawa	42.4	68.2	US 6 / IL 71 east (Norris Drive) – Morris, LaSalle	Northern end of IL 71 concurrency
LaSalle	Ottawa	43.9	70.7	I-80 – Joliet, Moline, Rock Island	I-80 exit 90
LaSalle	Harding	50.4	81.1	US 52 west (North 37th Road) – Dixon	Southern end of US 52 concurrency
LaSalle	Serena	52.4	84.3	US 52 east (North 38th Road) – Lisbon	Northern end of US 52 concurrency
LaSalle	Leland	59.5	95.8	US 34 west (Walter Payton Memorial Highway) – Mendota	Southern end of US 34 concurrency
LaSalle	Somonauk	63.6	102.4	US 34 east (Walter Payton Memorial Highway) – Yorkville	Northern end of US 34 concurrency
DeKalb	Waterman	74.3	119.6	US 30 (Lincoln Street) – Big Rock, Amboy	
DeKalb	DeKalb	85.4	137.4	IL 38 (Lincoln Highway) – Geneva, Rochelle	
DeKalb	Sycamore	90.8	146.1	IL 64 west (State Street) – Oregon	Southern end of IL 64 concurrency
DeKalb	Sycamore	91.4	147.1	IL 64 east (State Street) – St. Charles	Northern end of IL 64 concurrency
DeKalb	Genoa	98.9	159.2	IL 72 west (Main Street) – Byron	Southern end of IL 72 concurrency
DeKalb	New Lebanon	100.9	162.4	IL 72 east – Hampshire	Northern end of IL 72 concurrency
McHenry	Riley	107.2	172.5	I-90 Toll (Jane Addams Memorial Tollway) – Chicago, Rockford	I-Pass only; I-90 exit 36
McHenry	Marengo	112.2	180.6	US 20 (General Grant Highway) – Elgin, Belvidere	
McHenry	Marengo	112.7	181.4	IL 176 (Telegraph Street) – Woodstock	
McHenry	Harvard	118.9	191.4	CR A29 east (Dunham Road)	
McHenry	Harvard	126.17	203.05	US 14 (Division Street) – Woodstock, Crystal Lake	
1.000 mi = 1.609 km; 1.000 km = 0.621 mi: Concurrency terminus; Electronic toll collection
