= Illinois Route 71 =

State highway in central Illinois, US

Illinois Route 71
- Illinois Route 71 highlighted in red

Route information
- Maintained by IDOT
- Length: 69.37 mi (111.64 km)
- Existed: 1938–present

Major junctions
- West end: I-180 / IL 26 in Hennepin
- I-39 / US 51 in Oglesby; US 6 / IL 23 in Ottawa; I-80 in Ottawa; US 52 in Norway
- East end: US 34 in Oswego

Location
- Country: United States
- State: Illinois
- Counties: Putnam, LaSalle, Kendall

Highway system
- Illinois State Highway System; Interstate; US; State; Tollways; Scenic
← IL 70	→ I-72

Illinois Route 71 is a 66-mile-long (106 km) southwest-to-northeast state highway in north central Illinois. It runs from the end of Interstate 180 in Hennepin to U.S. Route 34 in Oswego. This is a distance of 69.37 miles (111.64 km).

== Route description ==
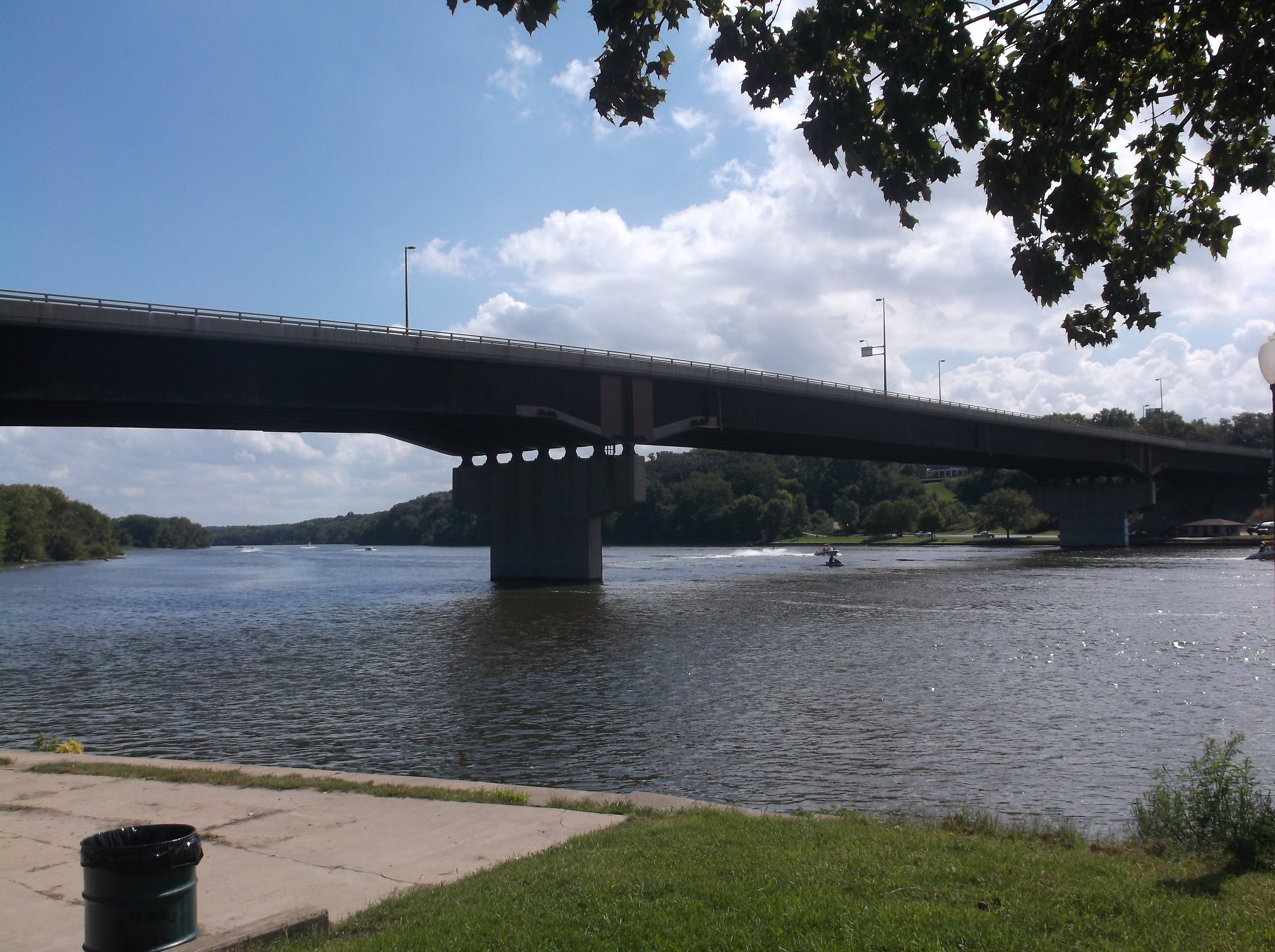
IL 71 crossing over the Illinois River in Ottawa

Outside of Hennepin, the road stretches east to an intersection with Interstate 39 near Oglesby, paralleling I-39 to the north for several miles on a concurrency with Illinois Route 351 before turning eastward again near LaSalle-Peru.

Between LaSalle-Peru and Ottawa, Route 71 parallels the south bank of the Illinois River and passes Starved Rock State Park. It then crosses the Illinois River on a simple four-lane girder bridge. It overlaps Illinois Route 23 through downtown Ottawa and U.S. Route 6 east from Route 23 before intersecting with Interstate 80. From here it continues to the northeast, passing through Norway, Newark, and Yorkville. Its eastern terminus is near downtown Oswego at an intersection with U.S. Highway 34 and Wolf's Crossing Road.

The now-defunct Prairie Parkway project, a limited-access highway, would have had an interchange with Route 71 southwest of High Point Road near Yorkville.

The stretch between US 34 and Orchard Road in Oswego was widened to four lanes in each direction, with the addition of center turn lane, in which the project was completed in the fall of 2015. There are also current plans to build a silica sand mine off of IL 71 near Starved Rock State Park, pending final approval by the City of Ottawa. The plan is currently opposed by environmental groups due to the intended use of the sand in fracking practices and the potential damage caused by airborne dust and blasting operations.

== History ==
Before 1938, Illinois Route 71 originally connected from US 51 (now IL 251) at Twelvemile Corner to US 30 at Aurora. In 1938, IL 71 moved onto a new route as US 30 was rerouted through Twelvemile Corner. It traveled from IL 29 near Bureau Junction to IL 23 at Ottawa. Before that, it was part of Illinois Route 89 as well as Illinois Route 7A, and Illinois Route 89A. In 1939, a ferry that crossed the Illinois River was replaced by a truss bridge. In 1942, IL 71 was extended towards US 34 in Oswego. In 1947, the road between Norway and Yorkville was finished and then opened to traffic. In 1969, IL 71 was truncated from Bureau Junction to Hennepin after IL 26 was extended to Peoria.

== Points of interest ==
Just south of Norway, there is a memorial dedicated to Norwegian immigrants who settled in the area, with a small park, a cemetery, and a plaque from King Olav V. This memorial commemorates the Fox River Settlement. Dating from 1834, this was the location of the first permanent Norwegian-American immigrant settlement in the Midwest.

Near E. 26th Road, south of Norway, Illinois, there is also a crashed airplane that serves as a "memorial" of sorts to commemorate the 1980s agricultural crash, which affected the rural farming county.

== Major intersections ==
County	Location	mi	km	Exit	Destinations	Notes
Putnam	Hennepin	0.00	0.00		I-180 north (IL 26 north)	Continuation beyond western terminus
Putnam	Hennepin	0.00	0.00	14	IL 26 south / Illinois River Road – Hennepin, Lacon	Exit number based on I-180 mileage; west end of Illinois River Road overlap
Putnam	Granville	6.6	10.6		IL 89 – Spring Valley, Metamora	
LaSalle	Oglesby	13.1	21.1		I-39 / US 51 – Bloomington, Normal, Rockford	I-39 exit 51
LaSalle	Oglesby	13.5	21.7		IL 251 – Peru, Tonica IL 351 begins	Southern terminus of IL 351; western end of IL 351 concurrency
LaSalle	Jonesville	16.8	27.0		IL 351 north – LaSalle	Eastern end of IL 351 concurrency
LaSalle	Deer Park Township	20.2	32.5		IL 178 – Utica, Lowell	
LaSalle	Ottawa	30.5	49.1		IL 23 south (State Street)	Western end of IL 23 concurrency
LaSalle	Ottawa	30.9	49.7		Illinois River Road south / I&M Canal Passage (Main Street)	Western branch of Illinois River Road merges; western end of I&M Canal Passage concurrency
LaSalle	Ottawa	31.6	50.9		US 6 west (Norris Drive west) / IL 23 north (Columbus Street north)	Eastern end of IL 23 concurrency; western end of US 6 concurrency
LaSalle	Ottawa	33.1	53.3		Illinois River Road north / I&M Canal Passage	Eastern end of Illinois River Road / I&M Canal Passage concurrency
LaSalle	Ottawa	33.8	54.4		US 6 east – Marseilles	Eastern end of US 6 concurrency
LaSalle	Rutland Township	35.1	56.5		CR 4 east (Jerry Hicks Road)	
LaSalle	Rutland Township	35.8	57.6		I-80 – Joliet, Moline, Rock Island	I-80 exit 93
LaSalle	Rutland Township	36.2	58.3		CR 18 west (Dayton Road)	
LaSalle	Rutland Township	38.7	62.3		CR 21 west (East 2153rd Road)	
LaSalle	Rutland Township	40.5	65.2		CR 15 south (Nate Fleming Road)	
LaSalle	Mission Township	44.3	71.3		CR 3 north (East 2603rd Road)	
LaSalle	Mission Township	46.0	74.0		US 52 – Mendota, Joliet	
Kendall	Newark	51.5	82.9		CR 4 east (Newark Road) / East Main Street	
Kendall	Fox Township	54.5	87.7		CR 17 east (Walker Road)	
Kendall	Fox Township	57.7	92.9		CR 7 north (Eldamin Road) / CR 5 south (Lisbon Road)	
Kendall	Yorkville	60.4	97.2		IL 47 (Bridge Street) – Yorkville, Morris	
Kendall	Yorkville	61.6	99.1		IL 126 (Schoolhouse Road) – Yorkville, Plainfield	
Kendall	Yorkville	66.9	107.7		CR 24 west (Van Emmon Road) / Reservation Road	
Kendall	Oswego	66.9	107.7		CR 20 north (Orchard Road) / Minkler Road	
Kendall	Oswego	69.37	111.64		US 34 (Walter Payton Memorial Highway) / Wolf's Crossing Road	Eastern terminus; highway continues as US 34 east
1.000 mi = 1.609 km; 1.000 km = 0.621 mi: Concurrency terminus; Route transition
