= Putnam County Courthouse (Illinois) =

Local government building in the United States

- U.S. National Register of Historic Places
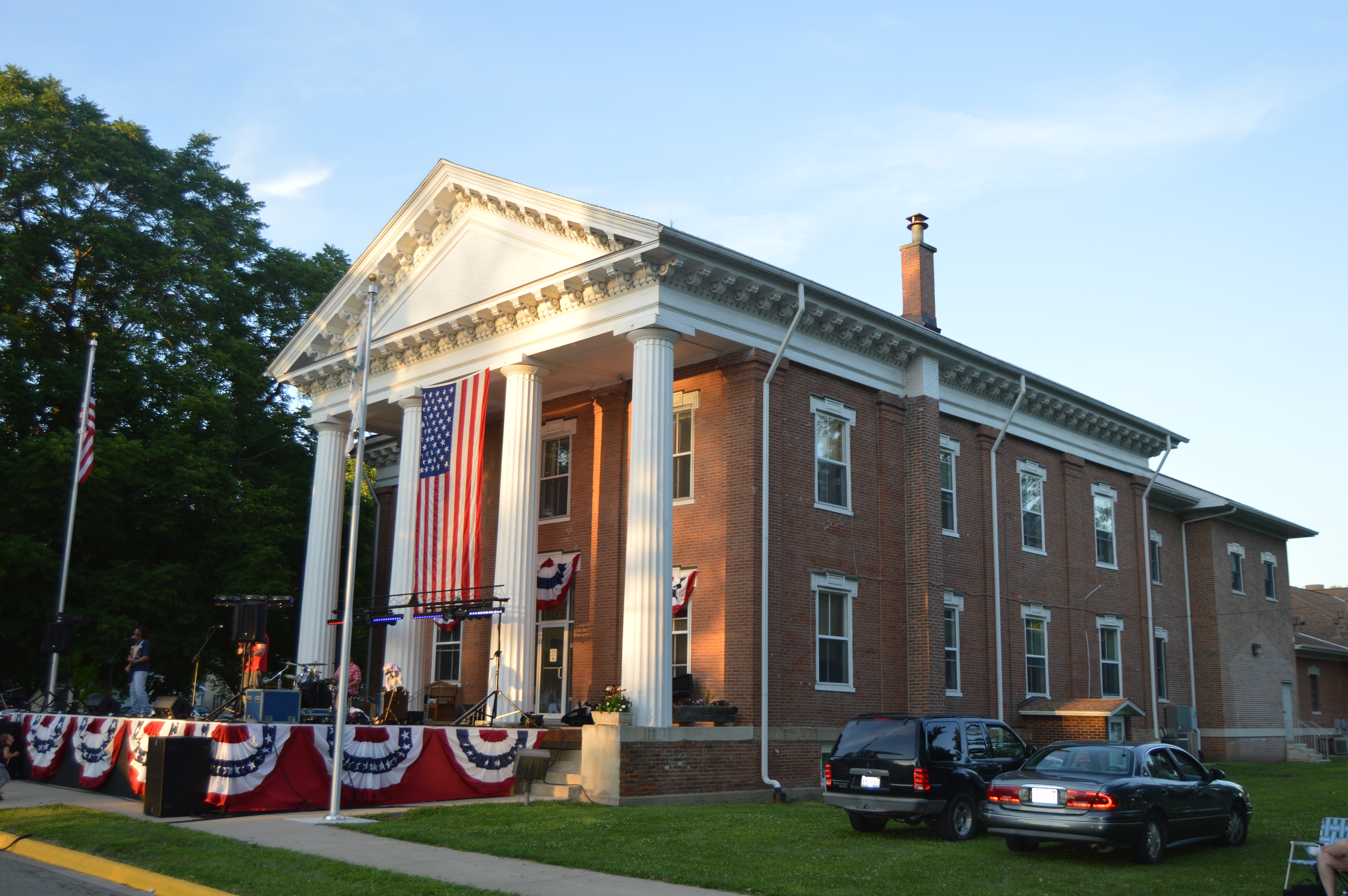
- Front and southern side

- Location within Illinois Location within the United States
- Location: 120 N. 4th St., Hennepin, Illinois
- Coordinates: 41°15′22″N 89°20′52″W
- Area: 1 acre (0.40 ha)
- Built: 1839
- Built by: Gorham & Durley
- Architectural style: Greek Revival
- NRHP reference No.: 75000672
- Added to NRHP: March 4, 1975

The Putnam County Courthouse, located at 120 N. 4th Street in Hennepin, is Putnam County, Illinois' county courthouse. Built in 1839, the building is the oldest courthouse in the state which is still in use. The courthouse was designed in the Greek Revival style and features four Doric columns at its front entrance. J.A. Williams later (1893) constructed an addition, which included a vault and document room, on the north side of the courthouse.

The courthouse was added to the National Register of Historic Places on March 4, 1975.
