= Volvo Island =

Artificial island in Illinois, US

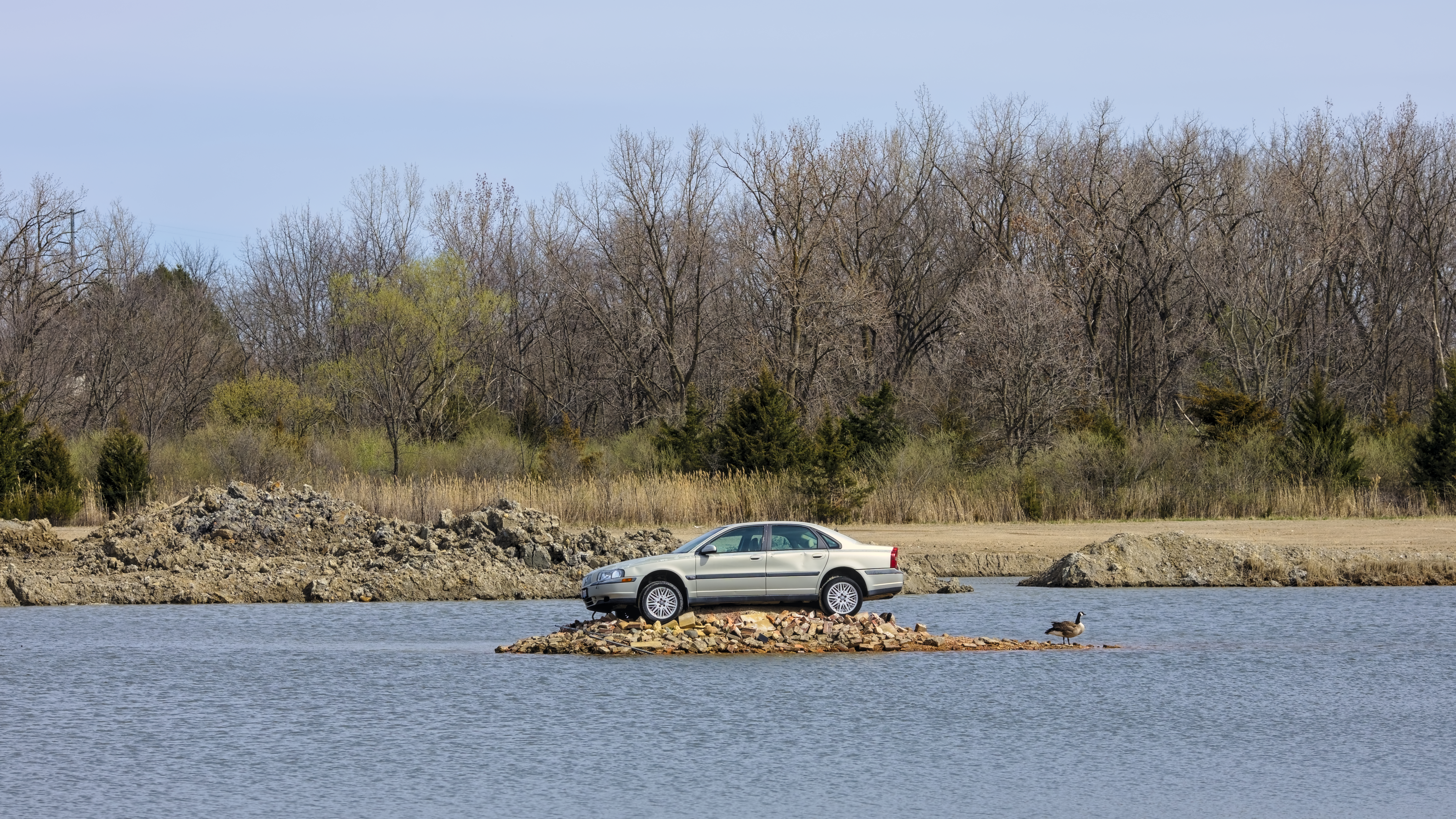
- Volvo Island
- Interactive map of Volvo Island

Geography
- Coordinates: 41°21′16″N 88°47′53″W
- Total islands: 1
- Area: 48.76 m^{2} (524.8 sq ft)

Administration
- United States
- State: Illinois
- County: LaSalle County
- Township: Rutland Township

Demographics
- Population: Uninhabited

Additional information
- The lake and the island are owned by Scott Mann

Volvo Island is a small man-made island in a flooded strip mine near Ottawa, Illinois, United States. The island's name references its sole occupant: a 2001 Volvo S80 sedan. Since its placement in January 2012, the vehicle has remained a distinctive landmark of the area.

== History ==
The creation of Volvo Island was the idea of Scott Mann, a resident of Ottawa and proprietor of two local car repair shops. The area surrounding the island was originally a strip mine that had been abandoned and subsequently filled with approximately 40 feet of standing water, forming a lake. In early 2012, Mann decided to place the Volvo on a peninsula extending into this lake. Utilizing a tow truck, the car was positioned at the end of the landmass. Subsequently, an excavator was used to remove the connecting land, effectively isolating the vehicle on its own small island.

Initially, Mann considered organizing a contest, inviting the public to guess how the car had been positioned on the island. However, due to safety concerns—specifically, the risk of individuals attempting to reach the island through deep waters—he decided against it. Nevertheless, for the fun of it, he still placed the vehicle there, hoping it would attract visitors to his shop.

== Public reception ==
Over the years, Volvo Island has garnered attention as a tourist attraction. The site has been visible on Google Maps and Street View since 2015, leading to increased interest and visits from those intrigued by its unique appearance. As of recent accounts, the location boasts a 4.9-star rating on Google, based on over 250 reviews. Visitors often describe it as "majestic" and a "premier tourist attraction".

== Current status ==
Despite its exposure to the elements over more than a decade, the 2001 Volvo S80 remains on the island, appearing relatively intact. There are no current plans to remove the vehicle or alter the island.
