= Green River (Illinois) =

Physical characteristics
- Source
  - location: Reynolds Township, Lee County south of Rochelle, Illinois
  - coordinates: 41°51′26″N 89°05′30″W
  - elevation: 775 ft (236 m)
- Mouth
  - location: Confluence with Rock River near Quad Cities
  - coordinates: 41°28′09″N 90°23′43″W
  - elevation: 558 ft (170 m)
- Length: 89 mi (143 km)
- Discharge
  - location: Geneseo, Illinois
  - average: 704 cu/ft. per sec.

Basin features
- Progression: Green River → Rock → Mississippi → Gulf of Mexico
- GNIS ID: 409398

The Green River is an 89-mile-long (143 km) tributary of the Rock River in northwestern Illinois in the United States. Via the Rock, it is part of the Mississippi River watershed. Much of the Green's course has been straightened and channelized. The Green River was created to drain water from former swamps to create better farmland. The Green River is home to many fish species including largemouth bass, smallmouth bass, hybrid bass, common carp, northern pike, and creek chub.

== Course ==
The Green rises in northern Lee County and flows initially southwestward through Lee, Whiteside and Bureau Counties, passing the town of Amboy. It turns westward in Bureau County and flows into Henry County, where it roughly parallels the Hennepin Canal and passes the towns of Colona and Green Rock. It joins the Rock River just west of Green Rock, in the Quad Cities metropolitan area.

== See also ==
- List of Illinois rivers
