= Interstate 180 (Illinois) =

Interstate Highway in Illinois

Interstate 180
- I-180 highlighted in red

Route information
- Auxiliary route of I-80
- Maintained by IDOT
- Length: 13.19 mi (21.23 km)
- Existed: 1967–present
- History: Completed in 1969
- NHS: Entire route

Major junctions
- South end: IL 26 / IL 71 in Hennepin
- US 6 in Princeton
- North end: I-80 in Princeton

Location
- Country: United States
- State: Illinois
- Counties: Putnam, Bureau

Highway system
- Interstate Highway System; Main; Auxiliary; Suffixed; Business; Future; Illinois State Highway System; Interstate; US; State; Tollways; Scenic
← IL 179	→ IL 180

Interstate 180 (I-180) is a north–south spur highway in Illinois that runs from Princeton to the small town of Hennepin at its southern terminus. It is 13.19 miles (21.23 km) long.

== Route description ==
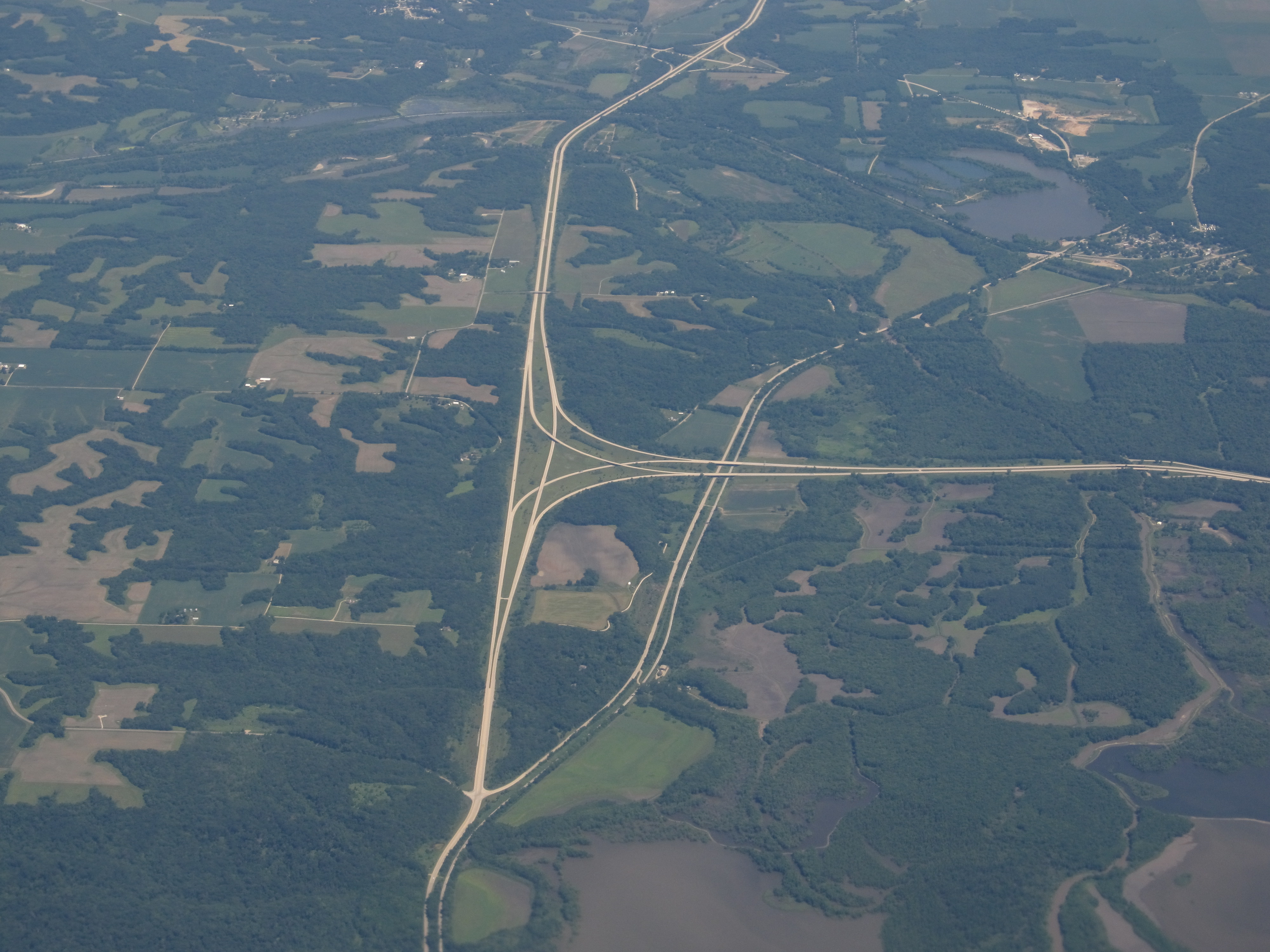
Aerial view of I-180/IL 29 interchange west of Hennepin

I-180 begins as a continuation of Illinois Route 71 (IL 71) at a diamond interchange with IL 26 northeast of Hennepin. The interchange is located adjacent to a former steel mill that was most recently operated by ArcelorMittal but closed in 2009 and demolished in 2017. The freeway travels west, carrying I-180 and IL 26 in a concurrency, and crosses the Illinois River on the north side of Hennepin to enter Bureau County.

On the west side of the river, IL 26 separates from I-180 and the freeway crosses over IL 29 before splitting at a Y interchange. I-180 turns north, intersecting an expressway that connects to IL 29, and travels northeast across Big Bureau Creek to intersect IL 26. The freeway intersects US Route 6 (US 6) east of Princeton and continues due north to its terminus, a trumpet interchange with I-80. I-180 has four lanes for most of its length, though an additional 1.5-mile (2.4 km) southbound lane exists prior to the IL 29 exit.

== History ==
Construction of I-180 was completed in 1969. The freeway was built primarily to connect I-80 to a new Jones and Laughlin Steel Company steel plant built in 1965 in Hennepin. In August 1970, the U.S. General Accounting Office published a report criticizing the Federal Highway Administration for prioritizing I-180 over spurs in larger metropolitan areas, including Tucson, Arizona and Tacoma, Washington. The report also stated that steel plant officials had demanded construction of the spur to allow trucks from the plant to easily access I-80. The steel plant closed in 2009 and has since been demolished.

I-180 is one of the least traveled Interstates in the nation, serving 1,950–3,600 vehicles per day as of 2013.

In the 2010s, work started to reconstruct portions of the bridge carrying I-180 over the Illinois River. A three-year project to rebuild the deck began in 2020.

== Exit list ==
County	Location	mi	km	Exit	Destinations	Notes
Putnam	Hennepin	0.00	0.00	14	IL 26 – Hennepin, Lacon IL 71 east	Southern end of IL 26 concurrency; roadway continues as IL 71
Illinois River		1.0	1.6	Gudmund "Sonny" Jessen Bridge		
Bureau	Bureau Junction	2.5	4.0	12	IL 26 north – Bureau Junction	Northern end of IL 26 concurrency; northbound exit and southbound entrance
Bureau	Bureau Junction	3.5	5.6	—	To IL 29 south – Peoria	Access via unnamed connector expressway
Bureau	Bureau Junction	8.0	12.9	7	IL 26 – Princeton	
Bureau	Princeton	12.0	19.3	3	US 6 (Grand Army of the Republic Highway) – Princeton, Spring Valley	
Bureau	Princeton	13.2	21.2	—	I-80 – Davenport, Joliet	Northern terminus; I-80 exit 61
1.000 mi = 1.609 km; 1.000 km = 0.621 mi: Concurrency terminus
