= Bureau Junction, Illinois =

Bureau Junction, Illinois Bureau
- Village
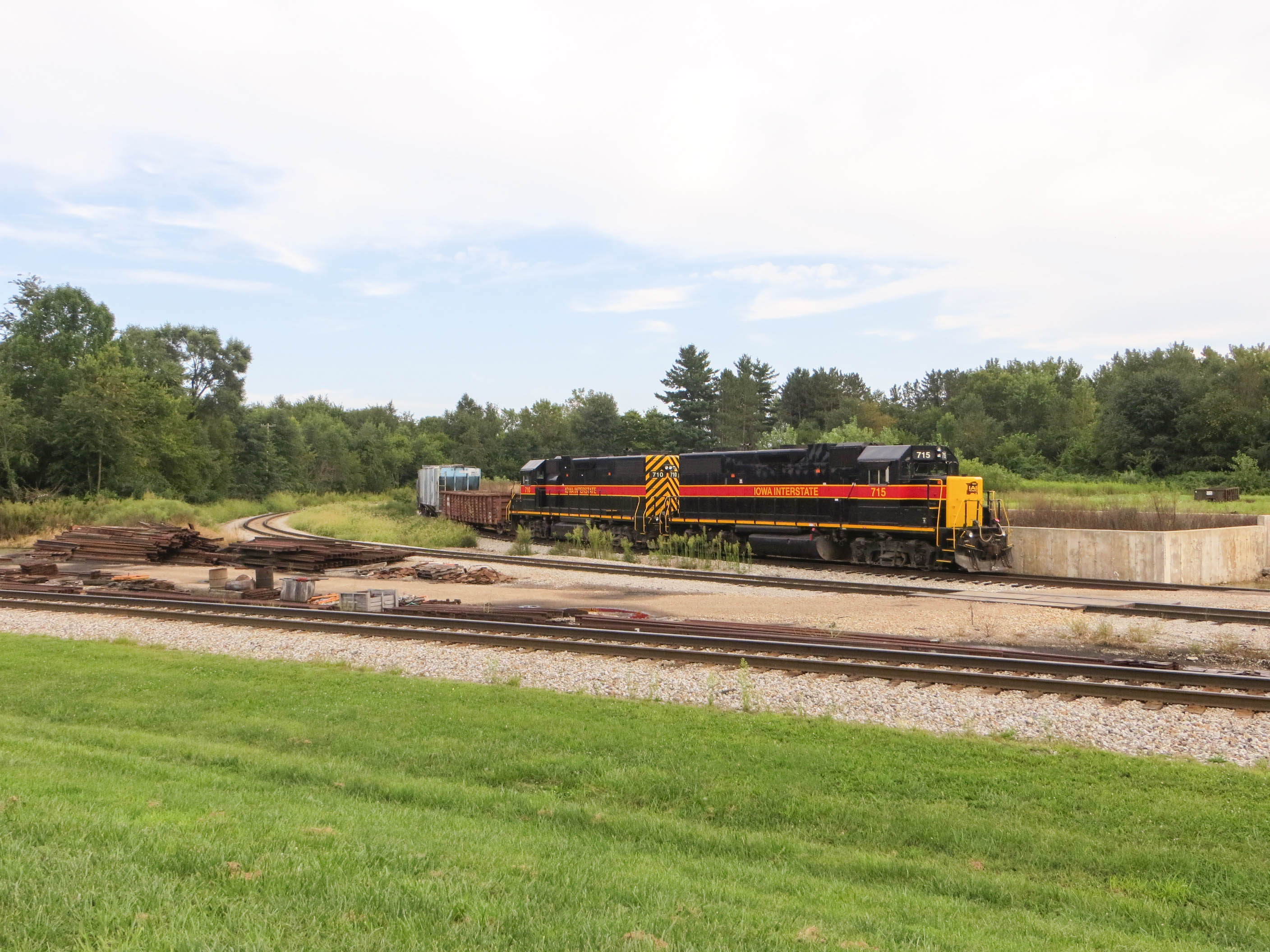
- An Iowa Interstate train at the railroad junction.

- Location of Bureau Junction in Bureau County, Illinois.
- Coordinates: 41°17′21″N 89°22′4″W
- Country: US
- State: Illinois
- County: Bureau
- Township: Leepertown
- Incorporated as a town: 1874

Government
  - Village president: Thomas Hollingsworth

Area
  - Total: 1.51 sq mi (3.9 km^{2})
  - Land: 1.45 sq mi (3.8 km^{2})
  - Water: 0.07 sq mi (0.18 km^{2})
- Elevation: 528 ft (161 m)

Population (2020)
  - Total: 281
  - Estimate (2024): 278 ▼
  - Density: 194/sq mi (74.8/km^{2})
- Time zone: UTC-6 (CST)
  - Summer (DST): UTC-5 (CDT)
- ZIP codes: 61315, 61356
- Area code: 815
- FIPS code: 17-09681
- GNIS feature ID: 2397497

Bureau Junction, usually called Bureau, is a village in Bureau County, Illinois, United States. The population was 281 at the 2020 census. The village name is shown as both "Bureau Junction" and "Bureau" on federal maps, and is commonly called "Bureau", including by phone companies and the United States Post Office. It is part of the Ottawa Micropolitan Statistical Area. Bureau Junction was the point where the Rock Island Line railroad's branch line to Peoria split. Track west and south of Bureau is operated by Iowa Interstate, while tracks east to Chicago were formerly operated by CSX but are currently leased to Iowa Interstate.

== History ==
The village is named for Michel or Pierre Bureau. Their original surname was probably Belleau, but local aboriginals may have had difficulty pronouncing the "l" sound. One or both of the brothers ran a trading post near where Big Bureau Creek empties into the Illinois River from 1776 until 1780 or 1790. A man named Buero, of mixed French and Native American descent, and possibly a descendant of one of the earlier Bureau brothers, was operating in this area as a fur trader in 1821.

In 1874 Bureau Junction had a sizeable railroad operation as the halfway point on the railroad between Chicago and Rock Island. The former Rock Island depot still exists today, albeit abandoned.

== Geography ==
According to the 2021 census gazetteer files, Bureau Junction has a total area of 1.51 square miles (3.91 km^{2}), of which 1.45 square miles (3.76 km^{2}) (or 95.51%) is land and 0.07 square miles (0.18 km^{2}) (or 4.49%) is water, mostly from Lake Rawson.

== Demographics ==
Historical population
Census	Pop.	Note	%±
1880	240		—
1890	363		51.3%
1900	545		50.1%
1910	534		−2.0%
1920	682		27.7%
1930	552		−19.1%
1940	483		−12.5%
1950	480		−0.6%
1960	401		−16.5%
1970	466		16.2%
1980	455		−2.4%
1990	350		−23.1%
2000	368		5.1%
2010	322		−12.5%
2020	281		−12.7%
U.S. Decennial Census

As of the 2020 census there were 281 people, 82 households, and 56 families residing in the village. The population density was 185.60 inhabitants per square mile (71.66/km^{2}). There were 141 housing units at an average density of 93.13 per square mile (35.96/km^{2}). The racial makeup of the village was 86.12% White, 0.36% Native American, 0.36% Asian, 1.42% from other races, and 11.74% from two or more races. Hispanic or Latino of any race were 9.61% of the population.

There were 82 households, out of which 23.2% had children under the age of 18 living with them, 45.12% were married couples living together, 7.32% had a female householder with no husband present, and 31.71% were non-families. 15.85% of all households were made up of individuals, and 13.41% had someone living alone who was 65 years of age or older. The average household size was 2.95 and the average family size was 2.68.

The village's age distribution consisted of 16.4% under the age of 18, 15.9% from 18 to 24, 20.5% from 25 to 44, 37.7% from 45 to 64, and 9.5% who were 65 years of age or older. The median age was 41.0 years. For every 100 females, there were 94.7 males. For every 100 females age 18 and over, there were 78.6 males.

The median income for a household in the village was $67,500, and the median income for a family was $75,000. Males had a median income of $50,417 versus $23,000 for females. The per capita income for the village was $29,969. About 0.0% of families and 6.0% of the population were below the poverty line, including none of those under age 18 and 4.8% of those age 65 or over.
