= Rutland Township, LaSalle County, Illinois =

Coordinates: 41°22′59″N 88°44′33″W

Rutland Township
- Township
- Location in LaSalle County

- LaSalle County's location in Illinois
- Country: United States
- State: Illinois
- County: LaSalle
- Established: May 1850

Area
  - Total: 35.69 sq mi (92.4 km^{2})
  - Land: 34.99 sq mi (90.6 km^{2})
  - Water: 0.70 sq mi (1.8 km^{2}) 1.97%

Population (2020)
  - Total: 3,662
  - Density: 104.7/sq mi (40.41/km^{2})
- Time zone: UTC-6 (CST)
  - Summer (DST): UTC-5 (CDT)
- FIPS code: 17-099-66456
- Website: rutlandtownshipil.org

Rutland Township is located in LaSalle County, Illinois. As of the 2020 census, its population was 3,662 and it contained 1,727 housing units. Rutland Township changed its name from Trenton Township in May, 1850.

== Geography ==
According to the 2021 census gazetteer files, Rutland Township has a total area of 35.69 square miles (92.44 km^{2}), of which 34.99 square miles (90.62 km^{2}) (or 98.03%) is land and 0.70 square miles (1.81 km^{2}) (or 1.97%) is water. It contains part of the unincorporated community of Dayton.

== Notable landmark ==
Rutland may not have many landmarks, but it does have at least one notable site: Volvo Island.

== Demographics ==
As of the 2020 census there were 3,662 people, 1,384 households, and 968 families residing in the township. The population density was 102.60 inhabitants per square mile (39.61/km^{2}). There were 1,727 housing units at an average density of 48.39 per square mile (18.68/km^{2}). The racial makeup of the township was 89.19% White, 0.66% African American, 0.35% Native American, 0.60% Asian, 0.00% Pacific Islander, 2.62% from other races, and 6.58% from two or more races. Hispanic or Latino of any race were 6.74% of the population.

There were 1,384 households, out of which 28.20% had children under the age of 18 living with them, 62.36% were married couples living together, 5.56% had a female householder with no spouse present, and 30.06% were non-families. 22.80% of all households were made up of individuals, and 7.80% had someone living alone who was 65 years of age or older. The average household size was 2.46 and the average family size was 2.96.

The township's age distribution consisted of 21.4% under the age of 18, 4.6% from 18 to 24, 20.6% from 25 to 44, 32.6% from 45 to 64, and 21.0% who were 65 years of age or older. The median age was 47.0 years. For every 100 females, there were 105.3 males. For every 100 females age 18 and over, there were 99.6 males.

The median income for a household in the township was $72,136, and the median income for a family was $85,441. Males had a median income of $51,603 versus $31,790 for females. The per capita income for the township was $34,368. About 6.4% of families and 9.1% of the population were below the poverty line, including 12.1% of those under age 18 and 3.9% of those age 65 or over.

Historical population
Census	Pop.	Note	%±
2010	3,698		—
2020	3,662		−1.0%
U.S. Decennial Census
