= Hennepin, Illinois =

Town in Illinois, United States

- Village
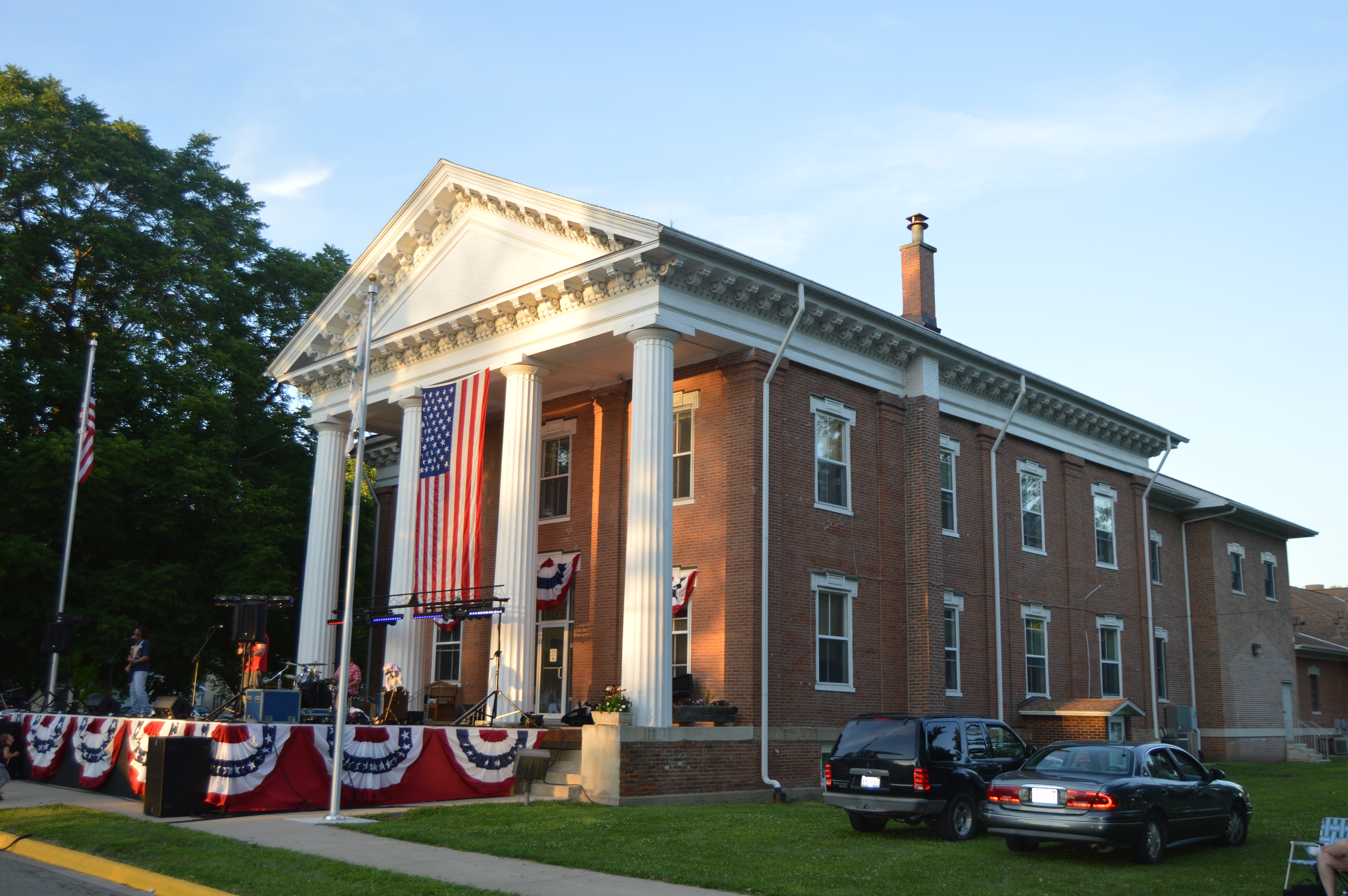
- Putnam County Courthouse
- Interactive map of Hennepin, Illinois
- Location within Illinois Location within the United States
- Coordinates: 41°14′53″N 89°19′30″W
- Country: United States
- State: Illinois
- County: Putnam
- Township: Hennepin
- Incorporated: February 13, 1837

Area
  - Total: 5.66 sq mi (14.66 km^{2})
  - Land: 5.31 sq mi (13.74 km^{2})
  - Water: 0.36 sq mi (0.92 km^{2})
- Elevation: 528 ft (161 m)

Population (2020)
  - Total: 769
  - Density: 144.9/sq mi (55.95/km^{2})
- Time zone: UTC-6 (CST)
  - Summer (DST): UTC-5 (CDT)
- ZIP codes: 61327
- FIPS code: 17-34098
- GNIS feature ID: 2398489
- Website: http://www.villageofhennepin.com

Hennepin is a village located on the Illinois River in Putnam County, Illinois, United States. As of the 2020 census, Hennepin had a population of 769. It is the county seat and the second largest village in Putnam County.

Hennepin is part of the Ottawa Micropolitan Statistical Area.

== History ==
The Village of Hennepin was named for the explorer, Louis Hennepin.

The Putnam County Courthouse, in Hennepin, was built in 1837, and is the oldest county courthouse in Illinois still serving its original purpose. Abraham Lincoln visited the courthouse, including when he campaigned for a Congressional seat in September 1845. The Putnam County Courthouse is listed on the National Register of Historic Places.

== Geography ==
=== Climate ===
Climate data for Hennepin, Illinois (1991–2020)
Month	Jan	Feb	Mar	Apr	May	Jun	Jul	Aug	Sep	Oct	Nov	Dec	Year
Mean daily maximum °F (°C)	32.3 (0.2)	37.1 (2.8)	50.1 (10.1)	63.5 (17.5)	73.7 (23.2)	81.7 (27.6)	84.5 (29.2)	82.9 (28.3)	77.1 (25.1)	65.2 (18.4)	49.9 (9.9)	36.7 (2.6)	61.2 (16.2)
Daily mean °F (°C)	24.6 (−4.1)	28.6 (−1.9)	40.1 (4.5)	52.0 (11.1)	62.5 (16.9)	71.6 (22.0)	74.5 (23.6)	72.7 (22.6)	65.8 (18.8)	54.1 (12.3)	41.1 (5.1)	29.3 (−1.5)	51.4 (10.8)
Mean daily minimum °F (°C)	16.8 (−8.4)	20.1 (−6.6)	30.1 (−1.1)	40.5 (4.7)	51.3 (10.7)	61.4 (16.3)	64.5 (18.1)	62.4 (16.9)	54.5 (12.5)	43.0 (6.1)	32.3 (0.2)	21.8 (−5.7)	41.6 (5.3)
Average precipitation inches (mm)	1.95 (50)	1.80 (46)	2.46 (62)	3.85 (98)	4.76 (121)	4.55 (116)	3.89 (99)	3.77 (96)	3.45 (88)	3.31 (84)	2.60 (66)	2.19 (56)	38.58 (982)
Source: NOAA

== Demographics ==
Historical population
Census	Pop.	Note	%±
1880	623		—
1890	574		−7.9%
1900	523		−8.9%
1910	451		−13.8%
1920	377		−16.4%
1930	312		−17.2%
1940	396		26.9%
1950	312		−21.2%
1960	391		25.3%
1970	535		36.8%
1980	716		33.8%
1990	669		−6.6%
2000	707		5.7%
2010	757		7.1%
2020	769		1.6%
U.S. Decennial Census

As of the census of 2000, there were 707 people, 304 households, and 206 families residing in the village. The population density was 135.4 inhabitants per square mile (52.3/km^{2}). There were 334 housing units at an average density of 64.0 per square mile (24.7/km^{2}). The racial makeup of the village was 97.17% White, 1.13% African American, 0.28% Native American, 0.71% Asian, 0.57% from other races, and 0.14% from two or more races. Hispanic or Latino of any race were 3.82% of the population.

There were 304 households, out of which 26.6% had children under the age of 18 living with them, 59.2% were married couples living together, 5.6% had a female householder with no husband present, and 32.2% were non-families. 30.3% of all households were made up of individuals, and 16.1% had someone living alone who was 65 years of age or older. The average household size was 2.32 and the average family size was 2.87.

In the village, the population was spread out, with 20.8% under the age of 18, 9.2% from 18 to 24, 24.6% from 25 to 44, 27.0% from 45 to 64, and 18.4% who were 65 years of age or older. The median age was 42 years. For every 100 females, there were 96.4 males. For every 100 females age 18 and over, there were 92.4 males.

The median income for a household in the village was $46,827, and the median income for a family was $56,111. Males had a median income of $48,500 versus $19,231 for females. The per capita income for the village was $23,981. About 2.6% of families and 2.9% of the population were below the poverty line, including 5.6% of those under age 18 and 2.9% of those age 65 or over.

== Industry ==
Hennepin's location on the Illinois River, along with its proximity to a Class I railroad (Norfolk Southern Railway), and multiple inter and intrastate highway routes (Interstate 80, Interstate 39, Illinois Route 180, Illinois Route 89, Illinois Route 71, Illinois Route 26, and Illinois Route 6) has, historically, made it a transportation hub attracting a variety of both small businesses and large industries.

J&L Steel, a cold roll steel mill built by Jones and Laughlin Steel Company on Hennepin's northern boundary, began operations in 1967 and employed 600 workers at height of production. The mill was later acquired by Ling-Temco-Vought, at which time it became known as LTV Steel. Ling-Temco-Vought's bankruptcy led to acquisition of the mill by International Steel Group (ISG). As a result of additional acquisitions followed by a merger, Putnam County's largest employer was absorbed by ArcelorMittal. Long and arduous union lobbying and protests ultimately proved futile and ArcelorMittal ceased production at the mill in March 2009. The mill's equipment was dismantled, sold, or shipped and on June 22, 2017, the vast plant was imploded. As of 2020, the 800 acres once occupied by the steel mill remain mostly vacant, though infrastructure has been retained in anticipation that another industry might one day purchase and redevelop the property.

Hennepin Power Station, a coal-fired power plant near Donnelley Wildlife Area on the western edge of town, was retired November 1, 2019.

There are also Cargill, ADM, and CGB elevators throughout the area.

Marquis Energy opened a 100 million gallon/year ICM/Fagen ethanol plant just north of town in April 2008.

== Landmarks ==
Edward Pulsifer House, museum and headquarters of the Putnam County Historical Society

Putnam County Historical Society's Agriculture Museum

Putnam County Courthouse (Illinois)

The Dixon Waterfowl Refuge, a privately maintained wetland, is located two miles south of Hennepin.

== Education ==
It is in the Putnam County Community Unit School District 535.

== Notable people ==
- Albert W. Durley, Wisconsin State Assemblyman and lawyer; was born near Hennepin.
- John Wesley Powell, Civil War veteran, geologist, teacher and superintendent of Hennepin schools.
