= Colona, Illinois =

Colona Green Rock
- City
- City of Colona
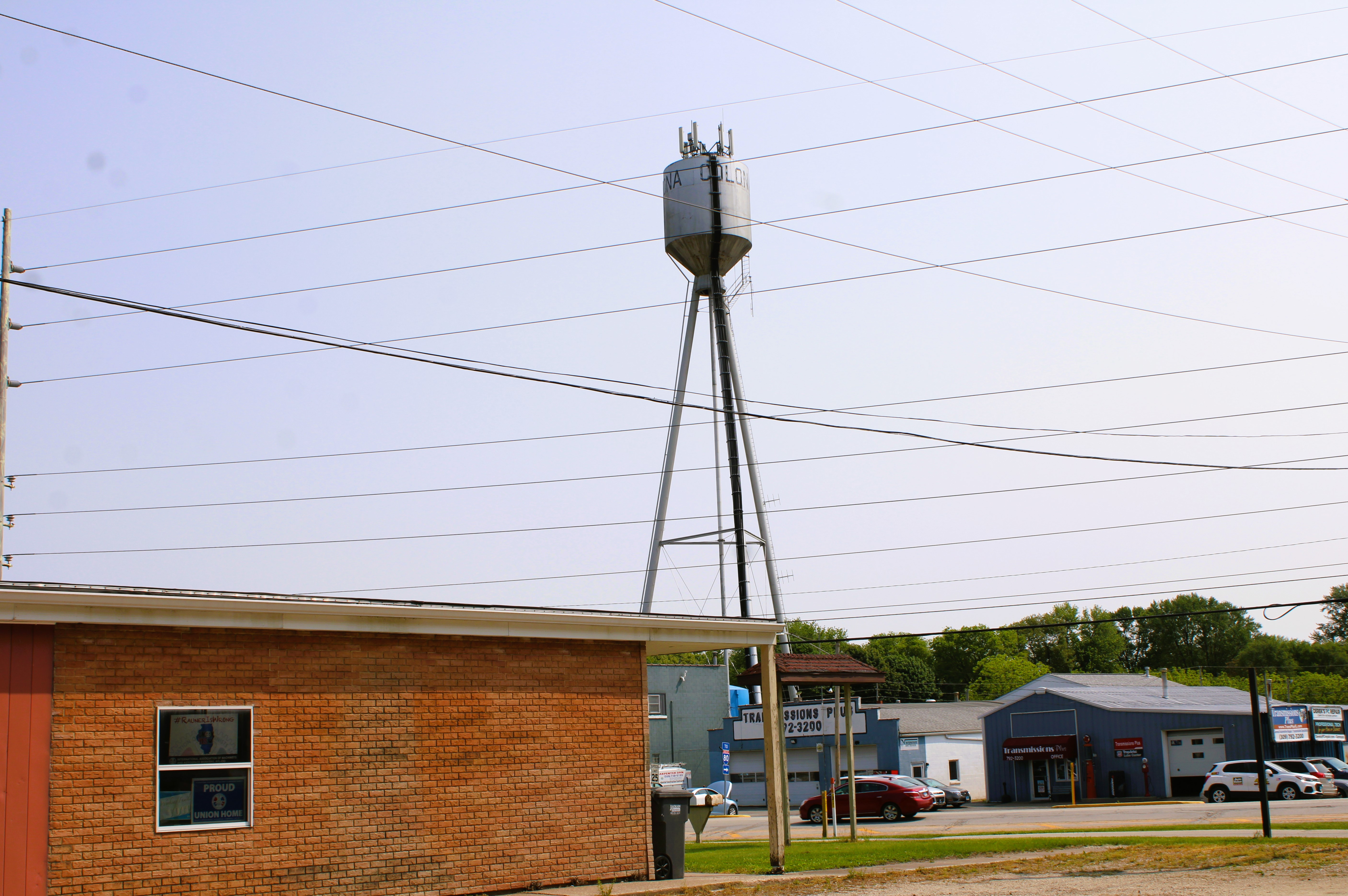
- Colona in May 2023

- Location of Colona in Henry County, Illinois.

- Location of Illinois in the United States
- Coordinates: 41°27′42″N 90°22′12″W
- Country: United States
- State: Illinois
- County: Henry
- Township: East Moline

Area
  - Total: 3.92 sq mi (10.16 km^{2})
  - Land: 3.82 sq mi (9.89 km^{2})
  - Water: 0.10 sq mi (0.27 km^{2})
- Elevation: 679 ft (207 m)

Population (2020)
  - Total: 5,045
  - Density: 1,320/sq mi (510/km^{2})
- Time zone: UTC-6 (CST)
  - Summer (DST): UTC-5 (CDT)
- ZIP Code(s): 61241
- Area code: 309
- FIPS code: 17-15664
- GNIS feature ID: 2393602
- Website: www.ColonaIL.com

Colona is a city in Henry County, Illinois, along the Green River. It is part of the Quad Cities metropolitan area. The population was 5,045 at the 2020 Census.

The City of Colona was created in 1997 by the merger of the former City of Green Rock and the former Village of Colona. It was the first community in Illinois to merge by popular vote.

== Geography ==
Colona lies near the Rock River in a valley, and is surrounded by higher land. This is where the Green River and Hennepin Canal flow into the Rock River (Mississippi River).

According to the 2010 census, Colona has a total area of 4.126 square miles (10.69 km^{2}), of which 4.02 square miles (10.41 km^{2}) (or 97.43%) is land and 0.106 square miles (0.27 km^{2}) (or 2.57%) is water.

== Demographics ==
Historical population
Census	Pop.	Note	%±
1910	217		—
1920	211		−2.8%
1930	244		15.6%
1940	264		8.2%
1950	319		20.8%
1960	491		53.9%
1970	1,293		163.3%
1980	2,172		68.0%
1990	2,237		3.0%
2000	5,173		131.2%
2010	5,099		−1.4%
2020	5,045		−1.1%
U.S. Decennial Census

=== 2020 census ===
As of the 2020 census, Colona had a population of 5,045. There were 1,473 families residing in the city, and the population density was 1,286.33 inhabitants per square mile (496.65/km^{2}).

The median age was 41.0 years. 22.1% of residents were under the age of 18 and 17.1% were 65 years of age or older. For every 100 females, there were 100.7 males, and for every 100 females age 18 and over there were 100.3 males age 18 and over.

98.4% of residents lived in urban areas, while 1.6% lived in rural areas.

There were 2,050 households in Colona, of which 29.5% had children under the age of 18 living in them. Of all households, 51.0% were married-couple households, 18.3% were households with a male householder and no spouse or partner present, and 22.0% were households with a female householder and no spouse or partner present. About 24.9% of all households were made up of individuals and 10.3% had someone living alone who was 65 years of age or older.

There were 2,189 housing units at an average density of 558.13 per square mile (215.50/km^{2}); 6.3% were vacant. The homeowner vacancy rate was 2.2% and the rental vacancy rate was 5.6%.

Racial composition as of the 2020 census
Race	Number	Percent
White	4,483	88.9%
Black or African American	52	1.0%
American Indian and Alaska Native	24	0.5%
Asian	13	0.3%
Native Hawaiian and Other Pacific Islander	3	0.1%
Some other race	100	2.0%
Two or more races	370	7.3%
Hispanic or Latino (of any race)	389	7.7%

=== Income and poverty ===
The median income for a household in the city was $64,643, and the median income for a family was $76,195. Males had a median income of $51,493 versus $23,167 for females. The per capita income for the city was $33,759. About 3.9% of families and 6.2% of the population were below the poverty line, including 8.0% of those under age 18 and 1.8% of those age 65 or over.

== Transportation ==
Quad Cities MetroLINK provides bus service on Route 30 connecting Colona to destinations across the Quad Cities.

== Education ==
The central portion of Colona is zoned to Colona School District 190 (elementary school) and United Township High School District 30. Some outerlying portions are in Geneseo Community Unit School District 228 while others are in Orion Community Unit School District 223.
