= List of county roads in LaSalle County, Illinois =

- Standard county road markers

Highway names
- Interstates: Interstate X (I-X)
- US Highways: U.S. Highway X (US X)
- State: Trunk Highway X (IL X or TH X)
- County Roads: County Road X (CR X)

System links
- LaSalle County Roads

The LaSalle County Highway System is a county-maintained system of arterial county highways in LaSalle County, Illinois, United States. They are marked with the standard M1-6 pentagon-shaped highway marker on the base of traffic signals at intersections with other county highways. They are not marked on any freeway or tollway exits or signed with separate reassurance markers. In addition, although concurrencies of county highways exist in the county, they too are not explicitly signed as such.

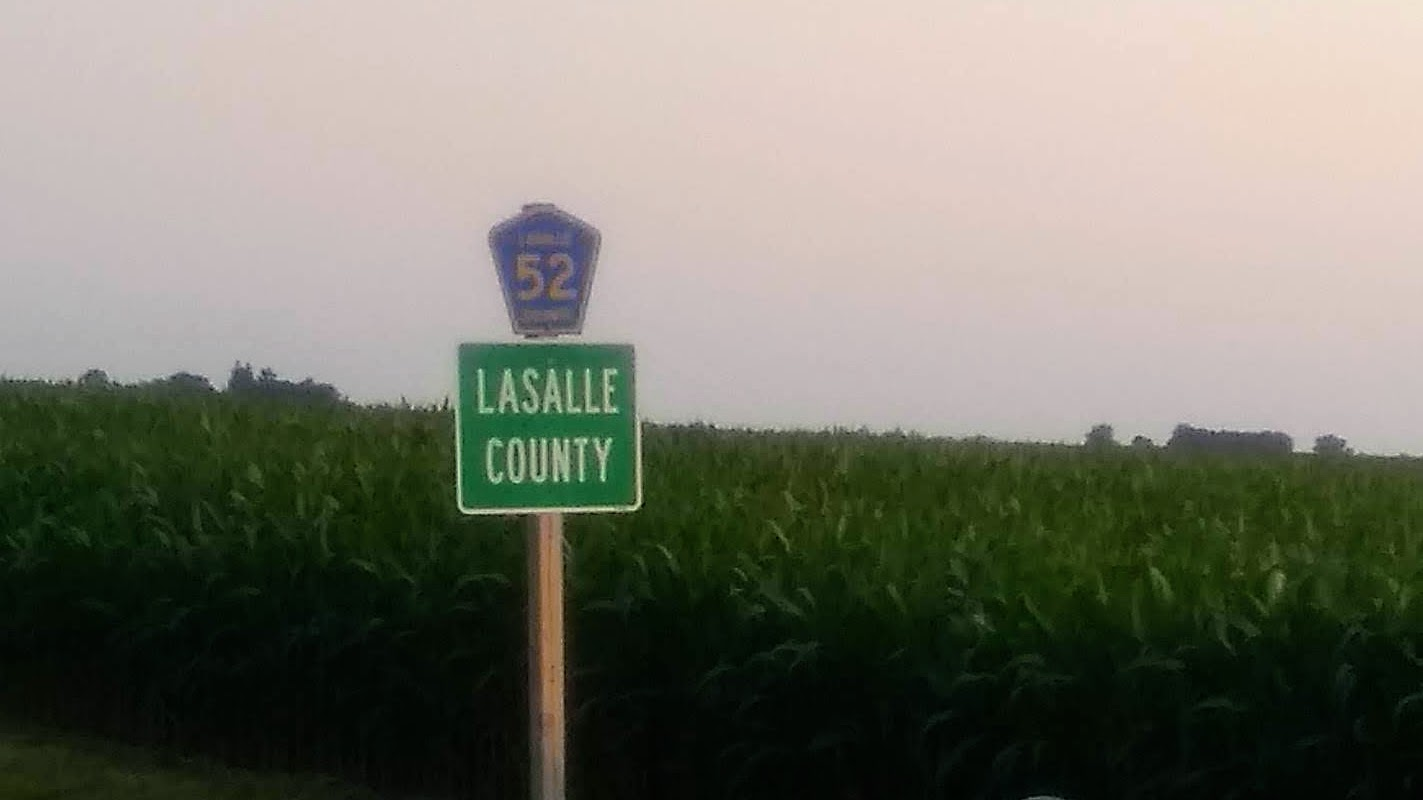
LaSalle County 52 north of Leland

== Route list ==
Number	Length (mi)	Length (km)	Southern or western terminus	Northern or eastern terminus	Local names	Formed	Removed	Notes
CR 1	9.73	15.66	US 52, IL 23 in Freedom Township	US 34 (Walter Payton Memorial Highway) in Earl Township	Wesley J. Freebairn Road	—	—	Passes through Harding
CR 2	14.13	22.74	CR 21 in Wedron	South Gage Street in Northville Township	Hoxsey Road, Somonauk–Serena County Highway	—	—	Passes through Northville
CR 3	13.1	21.1	IL 71 in Norway	LaSalle–DeKalb county line		—	—	Passes through Sheridan
CR 4	10.1	16.3	IL 71 in Rutland Township	LaSalle–Grundy county line		—	—	
CR 5	32.0	51.5	LaSalle–Putnam county line	LaSalle–Grundy county line	Spitzer Road, Gary Street, Leonore Road	—	—	Passes through Leonore
CR 6	21.9	35.2	CR 8 in Deer Park Township	LaSalle–Grundy county line	Jack Daughterty Road, Mazon Road	—	—	Passes through Grand Ridge
CR 8	8.8	14.2	IL 178 in Deer Park Township	IL 71 in South Ottawa Township		—	—	
CR 9	15.5	24.9	US 6 in Ottawa/Utica Townships	US 34 (Walter Payton Memorial Highway) in Earl/Meriden Townships	East 12th Road	—	—	Passes through Prairie Center
CR 10	4.1	6.6	US 34 (Walter Payton Memorial Highway) in Meriden Township	LaSalle–Lee county line	East 7th Road	—	—	Passes through Meriden
CR 11	0.4	0.64	CR 21 in Wedron	CR 2 in Wedron	East 2153th Road	—	—	Entirely within Wedron
CR 12	11.0	17.7	IL 251 in Mendota Township	N Main Street in Earlville	North 46th Road	—	—	
CR 13	13.5	21.7	US 6 in LaSalle	CR 19 in Troy Grove Township	East 4th Road, East 5th Road	—	—	Passes through Troy Grove
CR 14	3.6	5.8	IL 251 in Tonica	IL 178 in Lowell	Ed Lambert Road	—	—	
CR 15	—	—	LaSalle–Livingston county line	IL 71 in Rutland Township		—	—	Passes through Marseilles and Kernan
CR 16	3.28	5.28	IL 71 in Cedar Point	CR 63 in Peru Township	Ted Lambert Road	—	—	
CR 30	—	—	CR 6 in Brookfield Township	CR 15 in Fall River Township		—	—	Passes through Marseilles
CR 33	15.10	24.30	IL 251 in Dimmick Township	IL 23 in Dayton Township	East 1950th Road	—	—	
CR 40	3.26	5.25	IL 18 in Otter Creek Township	IL 170 in Allen Township		—	—	
CR 42	8.25	13.28	US 6 in Ottawa	US 52 in Freedom Township		—	—	
CR 43	8.92	14.36	I-80, IL 178 in North Utica	CR 19 in Triumph	East 8th Road	—	—	
CR 44	28.05	45.14	IL 251 in Groveland Township	IL 178, CR 14 in Lowell	Historic Illinois Route 179	—	—	Passes through Leonore
CR 52	0.88	1.42	Leland village limits	LaSalle–DeKalb county line	East 1950th Road	—	—	
CR 54	5.87	9.45	IL 71 in Cedar Point	IL 251 in Groveland Township	East 2nd Road, Ray Richardson Road	—	—	L-Shaped County Highway
CR 55	5.98	9.62	Ottawa city limits	CR 15 in Fall River Township	Trumbo-Gentleman Road	—	—	
CR 57	—	—	CR 5 in Vermillion Township	CR 8 in South Ottawa Township	Ben Samek Road	—	—	
CR 60	0.81	1.30	Dana village limits	LaSalle–Livingston county line	North 2nd Road	—	—	
CR 63	2.76	4.44	LaSalle–Putnam county line	IL 251 in Peru Township	Ben Samek Road	—	—	
CR 66	3.26	5.25	IL 23 in South Ottawa Township	CR 15 in Fall River Township		—	—	
