= List of state routes in Illinois =

Illinois Routes
- Standard Illinois route markers

System information
- Maintained by IDOT, ISTHA, and CDOT
- Formed: November 5, 1918

Highway names
- Interstates: Interstate X (I-X)
- US Highways: U.S. Route X (US X)
- State: Illinois Route X (IL X)

System links
- Illinois State Highway System; Interstate; US; State; Tollways; Scenic

The Illinois Routes are the highways in the State Highway System of the U.S. state of Illinois that are not simultaneously part of the Interstate Highway System or the United States Numbered Highway System. These highways are maintained by the Illinois Department of Transportation (IDOT), with the exception of Illinois Route 390 (IL 390) and parts of IL 56 and IL 110, which are maintained by the Illinois State Toll Highway Authority (ISTHA), and all routes that enter the Chicago city limits are maintained by the Chicago Department of Transportation.

== History ==
Illinois's state route numbers originated in 1918 as State Bond Issues 1 through 46, used to finance the new roads. The numbers of the bond issues were then used to mark the highway routes along the way. Another series of bond issues were authorized in 1924 (47–185) and again were used to mark the roads they paid for. After that the route numbers evolved into a separate system. The State Bond Issue numbers (SBI) remained as inventory designations on the original routes even after the numbered portion was changed, deleted or rerouted. These SBI numbers remain on IDOT district maps to this day and are used along with other designations for bid requests and other official documents.

During the middle part of the 20th century the state numbered routes expanded to new roads around the state. When the United States Numbered Highway System was introduced in the late 1920s many of the new US Routes were already part of the state system and the US number was just added to signposts. During 1930s as the US Highway System matured, redundant state numbers were often removed from US Routes. During 1950s and into 1980s, as the Interstate Highway System started to supplant many US Routes, redundant numbers were removed or replaced with state numbers. After the original Interstate Highways were substantially completed in the early 1970s many state (and US) routes, especially in the Chicago metro area, were removed or shortened as unnecessary.

While US and Interstate systems use even numbers for primary east–west routes and odd for north–south, there is no such rule for Illinois route numbers. Also, three-digit route numbers are usually not related to their one- or two-digit counterpart. There are several exceptions to this however.

== General notes ==
Illinois has used route numbers from IL 1 through IL 186 inclusive as well as many others up to IL 594.

Illinois has used letter suffixes on several state highways, including "A", "B". "C", "N" (for north) and "S" (for south). A, B and C suffixes were used for spurs of a nearby route, the N and S were legs of IL 113 on either side of the Kankakee River.

Illinois has also used special routes, such as "Business", "Alternate", "City", "Bypass" and "Truck" on state-numbered highways. Only a pair of truck routes as well as a batch of business routes remain in Illinois, all other special state highways have been renumbered or the markers removed.

== Primary routes ==
Number	Length (mi)	Length (km)	Southern or western terminus	Northern or eastern terminus	Formed	Removed	Notes
IL 1	323.06	519.91	Cave-in-Rock Ferry in Cave-in-Rock	I-57 in Chicago	1918	current	IL 1 was posted on what is now IL 394 from 1957 to 1964, the old road was Alt. IL 1 during that time
IL 2	73.91	118.95	IL 40 in Sterling	WIS 213 at South Beloit	1918	current	Originally Rockford to Dixon to Mendota to Cairo; replaced by US 51 south of Mendota
IL 3	187.44	301.66	US 51/IL 37 in Cairo	IL 100 in Grafton	1918	current	Originally Morrison to Chester, replaced by other roads including IL 78 and US 67 north of the St. Louis area
IL 4	170.44	274.30	IL 13/IL 127 in Murphysboro	I-55 Bus./IL 29 in Springfield	1918	current	Originally Chicago to St. Louis, mostly replaced by US 66 except from Springfield to Staunton where IL 4 was used on the old road and US 66 on the new; IL 4 replaced the old IL 43 Staunton to near Murphysboro
IL 4A	—	—	—	—	1925	1967	Ran Chicago to Joliet along Archer Avenue, Replaced by IL 171
IL 5	—	—	—	—	1918	1967	Originally Chicago to East Dubuque, replaced mostly by US 20 except near Rockford until that was replaced later by Business US 20
IL 5	15.78	25.40	US 67 in Rock Island	I-80/I-88/IL 92/IL 110 (CKC) in East Moline	1971	current	replaced IL 190 on the East–West Tollway until 1987 when it was replaced by I-88 east of I-80
IL 6	—	—	—	—	1918	1933	Originally Chicago to Fulton, replaced by US 30, later to become Alt. US 30 and now IL 38
IL 6	10.11	16.27	I-74/I-474 in Peoria	IL 29 in Mossville	c. 1971	current	applied to freeway extension of I-474 around 1982
IL 7	28.06	45.16	US 6 in Rockdale	IL 43 in Worth	1918	current	Originally Chicago to East Moline, replaced west of Orland Park by US 6 about 1928 then extended to Rockdale in 1969
IL 8	45.51	73.24	IL 97 in Maquon	US 24 in Washington	1918	current	Originally Gulfport to Sheldon, removed in parts and replaced by US 34, US 24 and other routes
IL 9	218.31	351.34	Iowa 2 at Niota	SR 26/SR 352 at Hoopeston	1918	current	Originally Hamilton to Cheneyville, replaced in part by US 136, IL 41 and IL 9
IL 10	91.35	147.01	US 136 in Easton	US 150 in Champaign	1918	current	Originally Jacksonville to Decatur, later extended to Danville and Havana
IL 11	—	—	—	—	1918	1933	Originally Terre Haute to St. Louis, replaced by US 40
IL 11	—	—	—	—	1945	1948	replaced by US 40 alternate, and now IL 140
IL 12	—	—	—	—	1918	1933	Originally Vincennes, IN, to St. Louis, replaced by US 50
IL 13	151.54	243.88	IL 157/IL 163 in Cahokia Heights	KY 56 at Old Shawneetown	1918	current	Originally Old Shawneetown to St. Louis
IL 14	76.24	122.70	US 51 in Du Quoin	SR 66 at Phillipstown	1918	current	Originally DuQuoin to Carmi
IL 15	149.64	240.82	I-55/I-64/US 40/IL 3 in East St. Louis	SR 64 at Mount Carmel	1918	current	Originally East St. Louis to Albion
IL 16	174.66	281.09	IL 100 in Hardin	US 150/IL 1/IL 133 in Paris	1918	current	Originally Paris to Litchfield, later extended west to Hardin; IL 316 replaced IL 16 after a new road was built from Mattoon to Charleston in 1962
IL 17	209.4	337.0	1st Street in New Boston	SR 2 at Grant Park	1918	current	Originally Lacon to Grant Park; ferry at New Boston dropped in 1973
IL 18	—	—	—	—	1918	1933	Originally Princeton to Chicago (Ogden Avenue)
IL 18	39.01	62.78	IL 29 in Henry	IL 17 in Blackstone	1939	current	Replaced IL 89B and IL 89C
IL 19	—	—	—	—	1918	1933	Originally Chicago to Harvard on what is now US 14
IL 19	33.64	54.14	IL 25 in Elgin	US 41 in Chicago	1949	current	Moved to current route in 1949
IL 20	—	—	—	—	1919	1941	Replaced in 1941 by IL 120 after confusion with the nearby US 20
IL 21	28.13	45.27	IL 43 in Niles	US 41 in Gurnee	1918	current	Milwaukee Avenue; originally Antioch to Chicago
IL 22	19.7	31.7	US 14 in Fox River Grove	US 41 in Highland Park	1918	current	Originally the "22 Loop" around the Chicago metro area; followed the current IL 22, then went to Crystal Lake via US 14, Aurora via IL 31 and Lynwood on US 30
IL 22A	—	—	—	—	1924	1925	Became part of IL 63, which was deleted in 1973; Now IL 68
IL 23	126.17	203.05	IL 116 in Pontiac	US 14 in Harvard	1918	current	Part of it (Streator to Pontiac) was once IL 118
IL 24	—	—	—	—	1918	1940	Replaced by IL 29 by 1940
IL 25	—	—	—	—	1918	1933	Kankakee to Fairfield, replaced by US 45
IL 25	35.04	56.39	US 34 in Oswego	IL 62 in Carpentersville	1934	current	Reused in the 1930s on current route
IL 26	139.35	224.26	IL 116 in East Peoria	WIS 69 at Orangeville	1918	current	Originally Freeport to Polo, extended north to the state line to replace IL 74 and south to Bureau then East Peoria replacing IL 89 and IL 87 in part; rerouted to the I-180 bridge in the 1990s due to a bridge removal over the Illinois River
IL 27	—	—	—	—	1918	1934	Was Savanna to Polo, now part of US 52
IL 28	—	—	—	—	1918	1933	Was Sheffield to Galesburg, now part of US 34
IL 29	175.36	282.21	US 51/IL 16 in Pana	US 6/IL 89 in Spring Valley	1918	current	Originally DePue to Peoria, extended in the 1930s and 1940s
IL 30	—	—	—	—	1918	1941	Was Peoria to Galva, replaced by US 150, IL 17, IL 78, US 34 and IL 91
IL 31	—	—	—	—	1918	1933	Was Quincy to Canton, replaced by US 24, IL 78 and IL 100.
IL 31	58.41	94.00	US 34 in Oswego	US 12 in Richmond	1937	current	Current route marked in 1937
IL 32	69.32	111.56	US 40/IL 33 in Effingham	IL 48 in Cisco	1918	current	Originally Decatur to Windsor, extended to Effingham in 1936 then to Cisco in 1998
IL 33	97.17	156.38	IL 128 in Beecher City	US 50 in Lawrenceville	1918	current	Originally Effingham to Gordon, extended to current route in stages
IL 34	61.74	99.36	Hopkinton Street / Walnut Street in Rosiclare	IL 14/IL 37 in Benton	1918	current	Originally was a T-shaped route from Harrisburg to Elizabethtown and a leg south to Golconda and a ferry went to KY 297 across the Ohio River; extended to Benton and to Rosiclare in 1937; part of this is now IL 146
IL 35	—	—	—	—	1918	1933	Used from Mound City to US 51, barely 1 mile long, to serve a federal cemetery; now part of IL 37 (part of IL 147 for a short time)
IL 35	2.42	3.89	US 20 in East Dubuque	WIS 35 at East Dubuque	1938	current	Used from East Dubuque to the Wisconsin state line, replacing IL 79
IL 36	—	—	—	—	1918	1937	Replaced by IL 94
IL 37	155.07	249.56	US 51 in Cairo	US 45 in Watson	1918	current	
IL 38	—	—	—	—	1918	1941	Replaced by IL 16, IL 159 (then IL 112, and IL 138
IL 38	89.28	143.68	US 52 in Dixon	US 12/US 20/US 45 in Westchester	1971	current	Originally Kampsville to Jerseyville that is now parts of IL 100 and IL 16
IL 39	—	—	—	—	1918	1933	Now part of US 150
IL 40	—	—	—	—	1918	1938	became part of IL 88
IL 40	112.05	180.33	I-74/IL 29 in East Peoria	IL 78 in Mount Carroll	1995	current	Formerly IL 88
IL 41	37.53	60.40	US 136 in Adair	US 34/IL 110 (CKC)/IL 164 in Galesburg	1918	current	
IL 42	—	—	—	—	1918	1972	Ran from Chicago to Winthrop Harbor, part of it is now IL 173; was the designation of Sheridan Road
IL 42A	—	—	—	—	1925	1967	Replaced by IL 43
IL 43	—	—	—	—	1918	1933	Replaced by IL 120 and IL 122
IL 43	—	—	—	—	1935	1963	Former IL 150 and IL 151; replaced by IL 4
IL 43	60.3	97.0	US 30 in Frankfort	US 41/IL 120 in Park City	1967	current	Formerly IL 42A
IL 44	—	—	—	—	1918	1940	Now part of US 52
IL 45	—	—	—	—	1918	1934	Became IL 179 in 1936; IL 179 was deleted by 1995
IL 46	—	—	—	—	1918	1938	Became in part US 45 from La Grange to Des Plaines
IL 47	169.76	273.20	IL 10 in Seymour	WIS 120 at Hebron	1924	current	Originally Hebron to Seymour before being extended in 1937 to Decatur
IL 48	85.38	137.41	IL 127 in Raymond	IL 54 in DeWitt	1924	current	Originally Onarga to Fullerton on what is now IL 54 and IL 48 to Raymond
IL 49	140.86	226.69	IL 33 in Willow Hill	US 45/US 52 in Ashkum	1924	current	Originally Willow Hill (near Jasper) to Chicago
IL 50	66.49	107.01	US 45/US 52 in Kankakee	US 41 in Skokie	1924	current	Originally Skokie to Richton Park, extended to Kankakee in 1972 replacing part of US 54
IL 51	—	—	—	—	1924	1933	Now part of US 45
IL 52	—	—	—	—	1924	1938	Replaced by IL 83; originally Lemont to Lynwood
IL 53	82.02	132.00	I-55 in Gardner	IL 83 in Long Grove	1924	current	Originally Long Grove to Romeoville until 1967 when it was extended to Gardner replacing part of Alternate US 66; parts are now a freeway extension of I-290
IL 54	—	—	—	—	1924	1941	Replaced by IL 83; originally Lemont to Lynwood
IL 54	109.35	175.98	I-55 in Springfield	US 45 in Onarga	1972	current	Formerly US 54; originally Antioch to Lemont
IL 55	—	—	—	—	1924	1964	Now IL 56; originally Chicago to Oak Brook
IL 56	32.52	52.34	US 30/IL 47 in Sugar Grove	US 12/US 20/US 45 in Bellwood	1924	current	Butterfield Road
IL 57	—	—	—	—	1924	1933	Replaced by US 41 and IL 50
IL 57	12.59	20.26	I-172/IL 110 (CKC) in Fall Creek	US 24/IL 104 in Quincy	1949	current	Originally Hull to Quincy; route moved to its current routing when I-172, now I-72, was completed
IL 58	28.3	45.5	IL 25 in Elgin	US 41 in Skokie	1924	current	
IL 59	71.13	114.47	I-55 in Shorewood	IL 173 in Antioch	1924	current	
IL 59A	—	—	—	—	—	—	Replaced by IL 60
IL 60	—	—	—	—	1924	1937	Replaced by US 12
IL 60	17.22	27.71	IL 120 in Volo	US 41 in Lake Forest	1967	current	Formerly IL 59A
IL 61	—	—	—	—	1924	1933	Richmond to Crystal Lake; now IL 31 (then part of US 12)
IL 61	44.77	72.05	IL 96 in Ursa	US 136/IL 110/IL 336 in Tennessee	1935	current	
IL 62	20.82	33.51	IL 31 in Algonquin	IL 83 in Des Plaines	1924	current	Originally Algonquin to Chicago (Harlem Avenue) on Algonquin Road west of Des Plaines
IL 63	—	—	—	—	1924	1973	Replaced in part by IL 21, IL 59, and IL 68
IL 64	138.61	223.07	US 52/Iowa 64 at Savanna	US 41 in Chicago	1924	current	
IL 65	—	—	—	—	1924	1971	Swapped routes with US 34
IL 66	—	—	—	—	1924	1933	Now IL 126
IL 67	—	—	—	—	1924	1940	Replaced in part by IL 176
IL 68	—	—	—	—	1924	1937	Now IL 131
IL 68	25.74	41.42	IL 72 in East Dundee	I-94/US 41 in Glencoe	1942	current	Dundee Road; originally Lake Bluff to Russell
IL 69	—	—	—	—	1924	1940	Now part of US 52
IL 70	19.01	30.59	West Howard Street/Oak Street in Durand	US 20 Bus. in Rockford	1924	current	Originally Durand to Mendota
IL 70A	—	—	—	—	1924	1938	Replaced by IL 170 (then IL 186)
IL 71	69.37	111.64	I-180/IL 29 in Hennepin	US 34 in Oswego	1938	current	Former IL 7A and IL 89A
IL 72	110.71	178.17	IL 73 in Lanark	IL 43 in Chicago	1924	current	Originally Lanark to Starks
IL 73	29.32	47.19	US 52/IL 64 in Lanark	Wisconsin state line near Winslow	1924	current	
IL 74	—	—	—	—	1924	1937	Replaced in part by IL 26
IL 75	41.64	67.01	IL 26 in Freeport	WIS 67 at South Beloit	1924	current	
IL 76	15.67	25.22	Business US 20 in Belvidere	WIS 140 east of South Beloit	1924	current	
IL 77	—	—	—	—	1924	1936	Replaced by IL 64
IL 77	—	—	—	—	1936	1937	Replaced by US 40 Bypass
IL 78	215.51	346.83	US 67/Business US 67/IL 104 in Jacksonville	WIS 78 near Warren	1924	current	
IL 79	3	4.8	East Dubuque	Wisconsin state line	1918	1938	Replaced by IL 35
IL 79	—	—	Mississippi River	Fall Creek	1967	1981	Replaced by IL 336
IL 80	—	—	—	—	—	1964	Now part of US 150 and IL 84
IL 81	25.78	41.49	US 150 in Lynn Center	IL 78 in Kewanee	1924	current	
IL 82	28.84	46.41	IL 17 in Bishop Hill	IL 92 north of Geneseo	1924	current	
IL 83	—	—	—	—	1924	1940	Now part of IL 17
IL 83	92.22	148.41	US 30 in Lynwood	WIS 83 north of Antioch	1941	current	Originally Galva to New Boston on what is now IL 17
IL 83A	—	—	—	—	1924	1940	Now unnumbered
IL 84	93.93	151.17	—	—	1924	1937	Replaced by IL 2; now IL 92
IL 84	93.93	151.17	US 6 in Colona	WIS 80 near Galena	1955	current	
IL 85	—	—	—	—	1924	1933	Now part of US 67
IL 86	—	—	—	—	1924	1937	Now IL 2
IL 87	—	—	—	—	1924	1935	Unbuilt spur to Dixon
IL 87	—	—	—	—	1941	1969	Now IL 26
IL 88	—	—	—	—	1924	1995	Replaced the original IL 40 in 1938; now IL 40
IL 88A	—	—	—	—	—	1938	Replaced partly by IL 17
IL 89	55.48	89.29	IL 116 in Metamora	US 34 in LaMoille	1924	current	
IL 89A	—	—	—	—	1924	1938	Now part of IL 71
IL 89B	—	—	—	—	1924	1939	Now part of IL 18
IL 89C	—	—	—	—	1924	1939	Now part of IL 18
IL 90	15.8	25.4	IL 78 near Laura	IL 40 near Edelstein	1924	current	
IL 91	—	—	—	—	1924	1934	Replaced by US 150
IL 91	40.72	65.53	US 150 in Peoria	US 34/IL 78 in Kewanee	1939	current	Formerly IL 30
IL 92	106.41	171.25	Iowa 92 near Muscatine, Iowa	US 34 in LaMoille	1939	current	
IL 93	9.6	15.4	IL 91 in Elmira	IL 40 in Bradford	1924	current	
IL 94	128.76	207.22	US 24 in Camp Point	US 67 in Oak Grove	1924	current	
IL 94A	—	—	—	—	1924	1937	Now IL 164
IL 94B	—	—	—	—	1924	1937	Now IL 135
IL 95	17.12	27.55	IL 41 in Bardolph	IL 97 in Cuba	1924	current	
IL 95A	—	—	—	—	1924	1937	Now IL 94
IL 96	141.16	227.17	IL 100 in Kampsville	IL 94 in Lomax	1924	current	
IL 97	—	—	—	—	1924	1933	Replaced by US 124; now IL 116
IL 97	104.43	168.06	I-55/I-72/US 36 in Springfield	US 150 in Knoxville	1938	current	
IL 97A	—	—	—	—	—	1937	Now IL 116
IL 98	—	—	—	—	1924	1937	Replaced by IL 10
IL 98	8.36	13.45	IL 29 in Pekin	I-155 in Morton	1939	current	
IL 99	—	—	—	—	1924	1935	Replaced by IL 94 and IL 61
IL 99	32.08	51.63	IL 104 in Chambersburg	IL 101 in Brooklyn, Schuyler County	1936	current	
IL 100	159.09	256.03	US 67 in Alton	IL 78 in Dunfermline	1924	current	
IL 101	19.43	31.27	IL 61 in Augusta	US 67 in Littleton	1924	current	
IL 102	18.33	29.50	—	—	1924	1955	Chatton to Camp Point; now IL 94 and IL 61
IL 102	18.33	29.50	US 45/US 52 in Bourbonnais	IL 53 in Wilmington, Will County	1961	current	Formerly IL 113N
IL 103	9.18	14.77	US 24 near Ripley	US 67/IL 100 near Beardstown	1924	current	
IL 104	125.91	202.63	US 24/IL 57 in Quincy	IL 29 in Taylorville	1924	current	
IL 105	18.33	29.50	—	—	1924	1937	Meredosia to Quincy; now IL 104
IL 105	37.58	60.48	IL 48 in Decatur	I-72 in Monticello	1945	current	
IL 106	18.33	29.50	—	—	1924	1933	Winchester to Whitehall; became US 36; now IL 106 again
IL 106	66.47	106.97	I-72/US 36/IL 110 (CKC) in Hull	US 67 in White Hall	1938	current	
IL 107	23.14	37.24	I-72/US 36/US 54 in Pittsfield	IL 99 in Mount Sterling	1924	current	
IL 108	54.06	87.00	IL 100 in Kampsville	I-55 in Raymond	1924	current	
IL 109	8.22	13.23	IL 3 in Dow	US 67 in Jerseyville	1924	current	
IL 110	—	—	—	—	1924	1938	Jerseyville to Benld
IL 110	—	—	—	—	1938	1949	Nashville to Freeburg; became US 460
IL 110	328	528	I-72/US 36/Route 110 at Hull, Illinois	I-90/I-94/I-290 in Chicago	2010	current	Chicago-Kansas City Expressway; originally Jerseyville to Benld
IL 111	82.18	132.26	Lake Drive in Centreville	IL 104 in Waverly	1924	current	
IL 112	—	—	—	—	1924	1964	Now IL 159; Originally Royal Lakes to Edwardsville
IL 113	33.95	54.64	IL 47 in Mazon	IL 17 in Kankakee	1924	current	Formerly 113S
IL 113N	—	—	—	—	1940	1961	Now IL 102
IL 113S	—	—	—	—	1940	1961	Now IL 113
IL 114	7.40	11.91	IL 1/IL 17 in Momence	SR 10 near Lake Village, Indiana	1924	current	
IL 115	63.37	101.98	IL 9 in Elliott	US 45/US 52 in Kankakee	1924	current	
IL 116	176.07	283.36	US 34/IL 94 in Gladstone	US 45 in Ashkum	1924	current	
IL 116A	—	—	—	—	1924	1994	Replaced by IL 117
IL 117	33.85	54.48	I-74 in Goodfield	IL 17 in Toluca	1924	current	
IL 118	—	—	—	—	1924	1933	Originally Streator to Pontiac on what is now IL 23
IL 118	—	—	—	—	1935	1938	Replaced by CH 7
IL 119	7.78	12.52	US 136/IL 1 west of Alvin	SR 28 east of Alvin	1924	current	Originally Heyworth to the Indiana state line north of Danville
IL 119A	—	—	—	—	1924	1937	
IL 120	—	—	—	—	1924	1937	Havana to Mason City on what is now IL 119
IL 120	34.48	55.49	US 14 in Woodstock	IL 131 in Waukegan	1941	current	Belvidere Road; formerly IL 20
IL 121	109.48	176.19	IL 130 in Greenup	I-55/IL 10 in Lincoln	1924	current	Originally Peoria to Decatur, then to the Indiana state line, near Chrisman
IL 122	31.53	50.74	IL 29 in Green Valley	IL 9 in Danvers	1924	current	Originally Bloomington to Havana
IL 123	33.72	54.27	IL 125 in Pleasant Plains	I-55 in Williamsville	1924	current	Originally Alexander to Athens
IL 124	5.71	9.19	IL 123 in Williamsville	Business I-55 in Sherman	1924	current	Originally Athens to Springfield on what is now IL 29
IL 125	37.1	59.7	US 67/IL 100 in Beardstown	IL 97 in Pleasant Plains	1924	current	Originally Springfield to Virginia
IL 126	—	—	—	—	1924	1932	Springfield to Litchfield; became US 66
IL 126	17.25	27.76	IL 47 in Yorkville	I-55 in Bolingbrook	1935	current	Formerly IL 66; originally Springfield to Litchfield
IL 127	167.53	269.61	IL 3 in Tamms	I-55/IL 48 in Raymond	1924	current	
IL 127A	—	—	—	—	1924	1937	Now IL 143
IL 128	55.57	89.43	I-70 in Altamont	IL 121 in Dalton City	1924	current	
IL 128A	—	—	—	—	—	1938	Short spur from US 40 to Smithboro in Bond County
IL 129	—	—	—	—	1924	1936	Effingham to Windsor; now IL 32
IL 129	4.06	6.53	IL 113 in Braidwood	I-55 in Wilmington, Will County	1960	current	Washington Street; originally Effingham to Windsor on what is now IL 32
IL 130	135.87	218.66	IL 1 in Grayville	I-74 in Urbana	1924	current	Originally Charleston to Albion
IL 130A	5	8.0	—	—	1930	1942	Newton to Sainte Marie
IL 131	—	—	—	—	1924	1937	Mattoon to Greenup; now IL 121
IL 131	15.15	24.38	IL 176 in Lake Bluff	WIS 31 near Pleasant Prairie, Wisconsin	1938	current	Green Bay Road
IL 132	—	—	—	—	1924	1937	Decatur to Mattoon; now IL 121
IL 132	13.57	21.84	IL 59 in Fox Lake Hills	IL 131 in Waukegan	1950	current	Grand Avenue
IL 133	52.05	83.77	IL 32 in Lovington	US 150/IL 1/IL 16 in Paris	1924	current	
IL 134	—	—	—	—	1924	1933	Paris to Indiana; now US 150
IL 134	5.62	9.04	US 12/IL 59 in Fox Lake	IL 120 in Hainesville	1950	current	
IL 135	—	—	—	—	1924	1935	IL 1 to the Wabash River bridge at Hutsonville
IL 135	20.31	32.69	IL 164 in Kirkwood	US 67 in Alexis	1937	current	
IL 136	—	—	—	—	1924	1935	IL 1 to Flat Rock
IL 136	3.22	5.18	Iowa 136 at Fulton	US 30 east of Fulton	1967	current	
IL 137	—	—	—	—	1924	1935	IL 1 to St. Francisville
IL 137	23.49	37.80	IL 83 in Grayslake	WIS 32 at Winthrop Harbor	1953	current	J-Shaped Highway
IL 138	—	—	—	—	1924	1937	Mount Carmel to Grayville; replaced by IL 1
IL 138	14.95	24.06	IL 159 in Bunker Hill	Illinois Street in Mount Olive	1942	current	Originally Mount Carmel to Grayville
IL 139	—	—	—	—	1924	1937	Now IL 14; originally Caramelville to Wabash River Bridge
IL 140	—	—	—	—	1924	1937	Fairfield to Cave in Rock; replaced by IL 1
IL 140	52.05	83.77	IL 143 in Alton	US 40 near Mulberry Grove	1935	current	Originally Fairfield to Cave in Rock
IL 141	18.17	29.24	US 45 north of Texas City	SR 62 east of New Haven	1924	current	
IL 142	55.06	88.61	Calhoun Street in Equality	I-57 in Mount Vernon	1924	current	
IL 142A	—	—	—	—	1924	1942	Now IL 242; replaced by IL 147
IL 143	—	—	—	—	1924	1937	Benton to Harrisburg; replaced by IL 34
IL 143	47.96	77.18	US 67 in Alton	IL 127 in Tamalco	1937	current	Originally Benton to Harrisburg
IL 144	—	—	—	—	1924	1964	Now IL 149; Originally Grimsby to Murphysboro
IL 145	43.47	69.96	US 45 in Metropolis	US 45/IL 34 in Harrisburg	1924	current	
IL 146	92.93	149.56	Route 34/Route 74 at East Cape Girardeau	IL 1 in Cave-In-Rock	1924	current	
IL 147	—	—	—	—	1924	1934	Marion to Cairo; now IL 37
IL 147	—	—	—	—	1942	1946	McLeansboro to Wayne City; replaced by IL 142, now IL 242
IL 147	12.81	20.62	IL 146 in Vienna	IL 145 in Eddyville	1965	current	Originally Marion to Cairo on now what is IL 37
IL 148	54.85	88.27	IL 37 in Pulleys Mill	IL 37/IL 142 in Mount Vernon	1924	current	
IL 149	45.92	73.90	IL 3 in Gorham	IL 34 in Thompsonville	1924	current	Formerly IL 144
IL 150	24.19	38.93	Route 51 at Chester	IL 154 in Cutler	1924	current	Originally Cairo to Harmel
IL 151	7.84	12.62	—	—	1924	1937	Replaced by IL 43; now IL 4
IL 151	7.84	12.62	IL 3 in Jacob	IL 4 in Ava	1940	current	Originally Steeleville to Murphysboro
IL 152	6.76	10.88	IL 13/IL 127 in Pyatts	US 51 in Du Quoin	1924	current	
IL 153	18.35	29.53	IL 154 in Sparta	IL 15 in Addieville	1924	current	Originally Eden to Irvington
IL 154	63.63	102.40	IL 3/IL 159 in Red Bud	IL 37 in Whittington	1924	current	Originally Pinkeyville to Sunfield
IL 155	10.81	17.40	Fort de Chartres State Historical Site	IL 3 in Ruma	1924	current	
IL 156	22.95	36.93	South Meyer Avenue/C Road in Valmeyer	IL 13 in New Athens	1924	current	
IL 157	33.50	53.91	IL 3 in Cahokia	IL 140 in Hamel	1924	current	
IL 158	25.81	41.54	IL 3 in Columbia	I-64/US 50 in O'Fallon	1924	current	
IL 159	64.90	104.45	IL 3/IL 154 in Red Bud	IL 16 in Royal Lakes	1924	current	
IL 160	—	—	—	—	1924	1935	Alton to Greenville; renumbered IL 140
IL 160	46.06	74.13	IL 15 in Addieville	IL 140 in Alhambra	1959	current	Originally Alton to Greenville
IL 161	67.24	108.21	St. Clair Avenue in Fairview Heights	IL 37 in Kell	1924	current	Originally Carlyle to Belleville
IL 162	—	—	—	—	1924	1938	Spring Valley to LaMoille; replaced by IL 89
IL 162	16.36	26.33	IL 203 in Granite City	US 40 in Troy	1954	current	Originally Spring Valley to LaMoille
IL 163	—	—	—	—	1924	1937	IL 1 to Palestine; replaced by IL 33
IL 163	9.89	15.92	IL 158 in Millstadt	IL 15 in Alorton	1954	current	Originally IL 1 to Palestine
IL 164	—	—	—	—	1924	1937	Pekin to west of Bloomington; replaced by IL 9
IL 164	35.70	57.45	US 34 in Gladstone	US 34/IL 41/IL 110 (CKC) in Galesburg	1937	current	Originally Pekin to west of Bloomington
IL 165	29.64	47.70	IL 9 in Merna	IL 47 in Sibley	1924	current	
IL 166	14.43	23.22	US 45 in New Burnside	IL 13 in Pittsburg	1924	current	
IL 167	12.24	19.70	US 34 in Wataga	IL 180 in Victoria	1924	current	
IL 168	—	—	—	—	1924	1941	Now IL 97
IL 169	—	—	—	—	1924	1939	Shelbyville to Dalton City; replaced by IL 128
IL 169	9.04	14.55	IL 37 in Karnak	US 45 in New Columbia	1949	current	Originally Shelbyville to Dalton City
IL 170	—	—	—	—	1924	1937	Red Bud to Sparta; replaced by IL 154
IL 170	25	40	IL 23 in Cornell	US 6 in Seneca	1945	current	Formerly IL 70A and IL 186; originally Red Bud to Sparta
IL 171	—	—	—	—	1924	1936	Thomson to IL 78
IL 171	38.61	62.14	US 6 in Joliet	IL 72 in Chicago	1946	current	Formerly IL 4A and IL 213; originally Thomson to IL 78
IL 172	—	—	—	—	1924	1936	Libertyville to Gurnee; replaced by IL 63 and now is part of IL 21
IL 172	13.06	21.02	IL 92 in Yorktown	IL 40 in Tampico	1946	current	Originally Libertyville to Gurnee
IL 173	66.20	106.54	IL 251 in Machesney Park	IL 137 in Zion	1924	current	
IL 174	5.3	8.5	IL 88 in Peoria	IL 91 west of Alta	1924	1983	
IL 175	2	3.2	US 24/IL 9 near Glasford	Glasford	1924	1935	
IL 176	41.28	66.43	IL 23 in Marengo	IL 131 in Lake Bluff	1924	current	Formerly IL 67
IL 177	47.59	76.59	IL 13/IL 158/IL 159 in Belleville	US 51 in Irvington	1924	current	
IL 178	8.49	13.66	Ed Lambert Road in Lowell	I-80 in North Utica	1924	current	
IL 179	16.3	26.2	IL 251 near Rutland	IL 18 near Streator	1924	1995	Part originally IL 45
IL 180	15.43	24.83	US 150 in Williamsfield	IL 17 in Victoria	1924	current	
IL 181	—	—	—	—	1924	1948	Now IL 33
IL 182	—	—	—	—	1924	1941	Now IL 161
IL 183	—	—	—	—	1924	1984	Now IL 154
IL 184	5.87	9.45	IL 149 in Royalton	IL 14 in Mulkeytown	1924	current	
IL 185	49.88	80.27	IL 127 in Taylor Springs	IL 37 in Farina	1924	current	
IL 186	—	—	—	—	1938	1945	Now IL 170
IL 190	—	—	—	—	1966	1971	Renumbered IL 5; now I-88
IL 192	8.31	13.37	IL 92 in Illinois City	IL 94 in Taylor Ridge	1955	current	
IL 194	16.7	26.9	I-90/IL 53 in Rolling Meadows	I-94 in Chicago	1960	1978	Now I-90/I-94 in Chicago
IL 199	—	—	—	—	1969	1980	Now IL 92
IL 203	9.51	15.30	Collinsville Road in Fairmont City	I-270 in Granite City	1964	current	
IL 213	—	—	—	—	—	1946	Now IL 171
IL 226	—	—	—	—	—	1946	Replaced by IL 172
IL 242	18.67	30.05	IL 142 in McLeansboro	IL 15 in Wayne City	1924	current	Formerly IL 142A
IL 250	33.44	53.82	US 50 in Noble	Business US 50 in Lawrenceville	1965	current	
IL 251	135.32	217.78	I-39/US 51 in Hudson	US 51/IL 75 in South Beloit	1982	current	Formerly US 51 in North Central Illinois
IL 255	23.3	37.5	I-255/I-270 in Pontoon Beach	US 67 in Godfrey	1998	current	Alton Bypass
IL 267	59	95	US 67/IL 111 in Godfrey	Business I-72/Business US 67/IL 104 in Jacksonville	1965	current	
IL 316	—	—	—	—	—	1981	Now part of IL 16
IL 336	80	130	I-172/US 24/IL 110 (CKC) in Quincy	US 136/IL 110 (CKC) in Macomb	1990	current	
IL 351	8.55	13.76	IL 71/IL 251 in Oglesby	I-80 in LaSalle	1966	current	Formerly Business US 51 in LaSalle
IL 390	9.80	15.77	US 20 in Hanover Park	IL 83 in Bensenville	2013	current	Formerly the Elgin–O'Hare Expressway; tolled
IL 394	14.63	23.54	IL 1 near Beecher	I-80/I-94/I-294 in South Holland	1956	current	
IL 594	3.07	4.94	O'Hare International Airport in Chicago	IL 194 in Chicago	1971	1978	Now I-190
Former

== Inventory routes ==
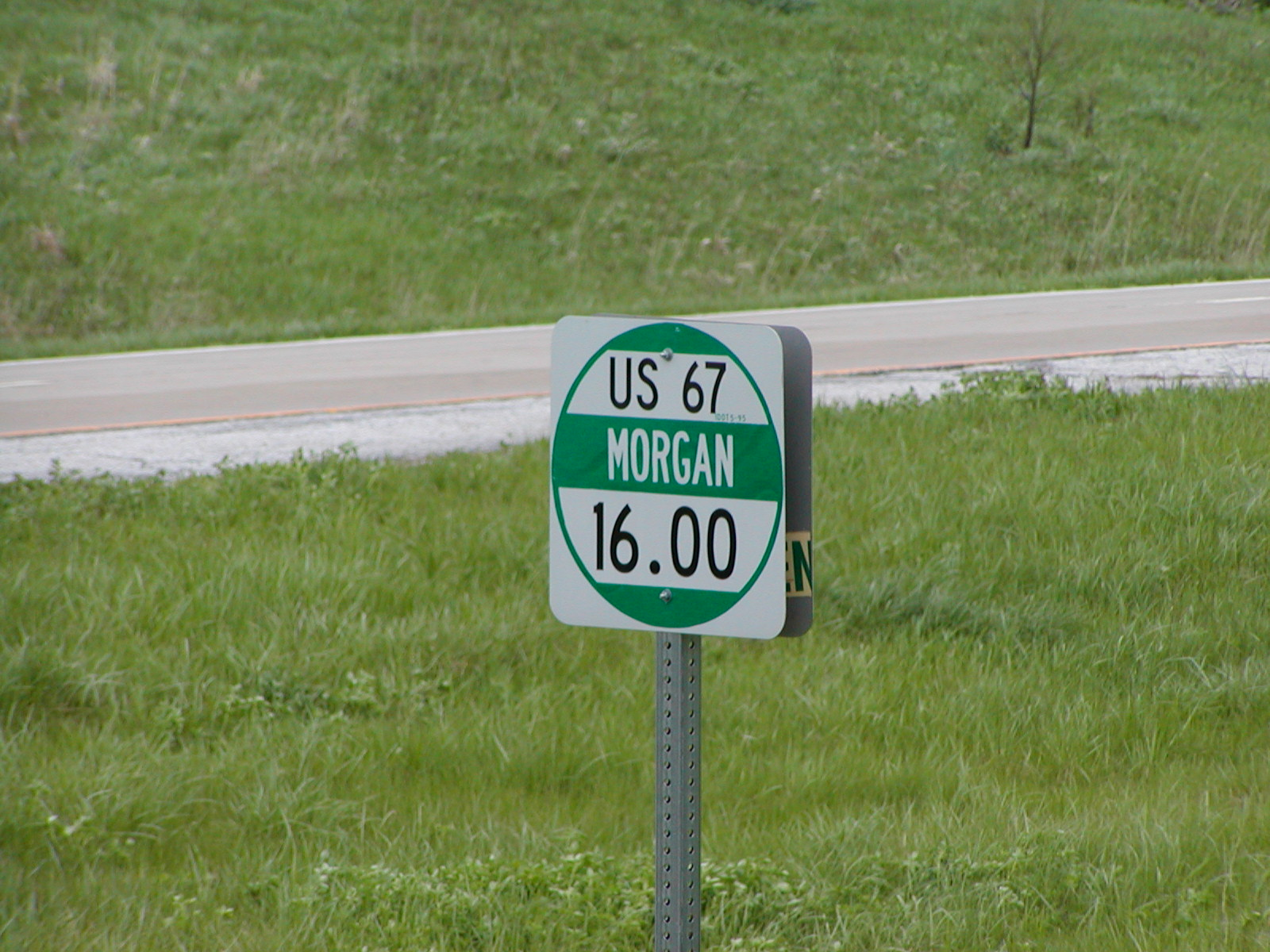
Inventory Route Number sign near Jacksonville IL (Morgan County) on US-67

Illinois uses unique "inventory number" signage on rural roads that are owned or maintained by IDOT but may or may not be part of the US or Illinois highway systems. These number signs are white squares, with a green divided circle. The county name is within the dividing line, the mileage from the county line is in the lower half and the inventory or route number in the upper. Number series vary between IDOT districts, in some areas the number used on otherwise unnumbered routes are a derivative of the former number (i.e.: "913" used on a section of former IL 13) or a sequential number unrelated to the original or former number (such as the 8900 series numbers used in the Galesburg–Macomb area). On many US and Illinois routes the posted number is used, with or without a preceding descriptor. These signs are not intended for navigation as route numbers are but rather as guides for IDOT crews and contractors and to identify specific intersections, culverts or other features.
