= Illinois Route 179 =

State highway in LaSalle County, Illinois, US

Illinois Route 179
- East 11th Road; LaSalle County Highway 44
- IL 179 highlighted in red

Route information
- Maintained by IDOT
- Length: 16.3 mi (26.2 km)
- Existed: 1935–by 1995

Major junctions
- South end: IL 251 near Rutland
- North end: IL 18 near Streator

Location
- Country: United States
- State: Illinois
- Counties: LaSalle

Highway system
- Illinois State Highway System; Interstate; US; State; Tollways; Scenic
← IL 178	→ I-180
← US 45	IL 45	→ IL 46

Illinois Route 179 (IL 179) was a 16.3-mile-long (26.2 km) state highway in LaSalle County, Illinois. The route ran from IL 251 south of Rutland north to IL 18 west of Streator. The highway was established in 1935 and reached its full length in 1940; it was decommissioned by 1995. The route is now part of LaSalle County Route 44.

== Route description ==
Route 179 began at a junction with Route 251 in rural LaSalle County south of Rutland. From here, the highway ran west through farmland to Dana. In Dana, the route turned north; it continued north past Dana to Illinois Route 17. The highway continued north past this junction, passing through Garfield before terminating at Route 18 west of Streator.

== History ==
Route 179 was established in 1935 between its current southern terminus at what was then U.S. Route 51 and Illinois Route 45 at Dana. In 1936, the route replaced Route 45 over its entire length between Dana and Route 17. In 1940, Route 179 reached its current length by replacing Route 17 between the junction of the two highways and Route 18. The highway stayed on this route until it was decommissioned between 1993 and 1995. Route 179's former alignment is now part of LaSalle County Route 44.

== Major intersections ==
The entire route is in LaSalle County.

Location	mi	km	Destinations	Notes
Groveland Township	0.0	0.0	IL 251	Southern terminus of Route 179
Osage Township	12.1	19.5	IL 17 (North 9th Road)	
Eagle Township	16.3	26.2	IL 18 (North 13th Road)	Northern terminus of Route 179
1.000 mi = 1.609 km; 1.000 km = 0.621 mi
