= Medina Township, Peoria County, Illinois =

Medina Township
- Township
- Location in Peoria County

- Peoria County's location in Illinois
- Country: United States
- State: Illinois
- County: Peoria
- Established: November 6, 1849

Area
  - Total: 29.78 sq mi (77.1 km^{2})
  - Land: 26.86 sq mi (69.6 km^{2})
  - Water: 2.92 sq mi (7.6 km^{2}) 9.81%

Population (2010)
  - Estimate (2016): 12,542
  - Density: 467.7/sq mi (180.6/km^{2})
- Time zone: UTC-6 (CST)
  - Summer (DST): UTC-5 (CDT)
- FIPS code: 17-143-48099

Medina Township is located north of Peoria, in Peoria County, Illinois, and in the Illinois River Valley (West of the river itself). As of the 2010 census, its population was 12,564 and it contained 4,993 housing units.

Medina Township changed its name from Franklin Township on an unknown date, but most likely in 1850.

Headquartered in Mossville, it is served by two school districts: Illinois Valley Central School District #321, and Dunlap School District #323. It also contains the census-designated place of Rome and much of the city of Peoria's Alta neighborhood.

== Geography ==
According to the 2010 census, the township has a total area of 29.78 square miles (77.1 km^{2}), of which 26.86 square miles (69.6 km^{2}) (or 90.19%) is land and 2.92 square miles (7.6 km^{2}) (or 9.81%) is water.

=== Cities ===
- Peoria (part)

=== Other Communites ===
- Alta at 40.812065°N 89.633881°W
- Lake of the Woods
- Mossville
- South Rome at 40.839855°N 89.55481°W

== Demographics ==
Historical population
Census	Pop.	Note	%±
2016 (est.)	12,542
U.S. Decennial Census
