= Groveland Township, Illinois =

Groveland Township may refer to one of the following places in the State of Illinois:

- Groveland Township, LaSalle County, Illinois
- Groveland Township, Tazewell County, Illinois

See also

- Groveland Township (disambiguation)
