= Mossville station =

Former railway station in America

Mossville

General information
- Location: Near IL 29; Mossville, Illinois
- System: Former Rock Island Line passenger station
- Owner: track owned by Iowa Interstate
- Line: Rock Island Line Peoria Branch
- Platforms: 1
- Tracks: 1

History
- Closed: 1970s

Services
| Preceding station | Chicago, Rock Island and Pacific Railroad | Following station |
Former services
| Peoria Terminus | Bureau – Peoria | Rome toward Bureau |
Location

Mossville station was a railway station along the Chicago, Rock Island and Pacific Railway in Mossville, Illinois. The station was alongside Illinois Route 29 and the Illinois River. It was a flag stop for trains such as the Peoria Rocket, between Chicago and Peoria. Freight operations are still provided on the single track line by Iowa Interstate.
