= Radnor Township, Peoria County, Illinois =

Coordinates: 40°50′25″N 89°41′26″W

Radnor Township
- Township
- Location in Peoria County

- Peoria County's location in Illinois
- Country: United States
- State: Illinois
- County: Peoria
- Established: November 6, 1849

Area
  - Total: 36.95 sq mi (95.7 km^{2})
  - Land: 36.95 sq mi (95.7 km^{2})
  - Water: 0 sq mi (0 km^{2}) 0%

Population (2010)
  - Estimate (2016): 3,600
  - Density: 97.8/sq mi (37.8/km^{2})
- Time zone: UTC-6 (CST)
  - Summer (DST): UTC-5 (CDT)
- FIPS code: 17-143-62510

Radnor Township is located in Peoria County, Illinois. As of the 2010 census, its population was 3,613 and it contained 1,330 housing units. Radnor Township was named after Radnor, Pennsylvania.

== Geography ==
According to the 2010 census, the township has a total area of 36.95 square miles (95.7 km^{2}), all land.

=== Cities ===
- Dunlap
- Peoria (part)

=== Other Communities ===
- Alta (mostly in Medina Township)

== Demographics ==
Historical population
Census	Pop.	Note	%±
2016 (est.)	3,600
U.S. Decennial Census
