= Illinois Route 170 =

North-south state highway in Illinois, US

Illinois Route 170
- IL 170 highlighted in red

Route information
- Maintained by IDOT
- Length: 25.00 mi (40.23 km)
- Existed: 1946–present

Major junctions
- South end: IL 23 in Cornell
- North end: US 6 in Seneca

Location
- Country: United States
- State: Illinois
- Counties: Livingston, LaSalle

Highway system
- Illinois State Highway System; Interstate; US; State; Tollways; Scenic
← IL 169	→ IL 171

Illinois Route 170 is a north–south state road in north-central Illinois. It runs from Illinois Route 23 well north of Pontiac to U.S. Route 6 in Seneca. This is a distance of 25.00 miles (40.23 km).

== Route description ==
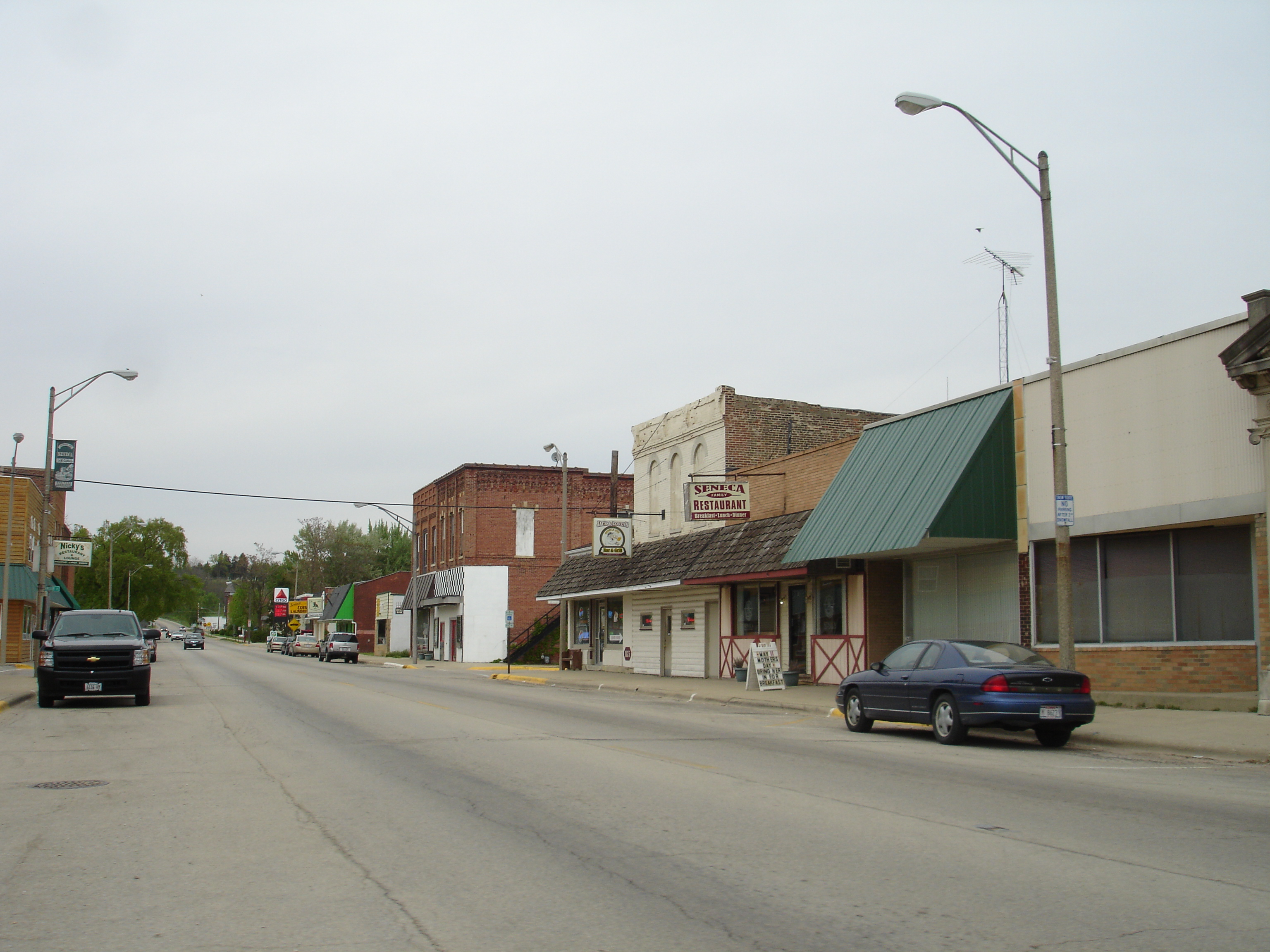
A view of Illinois Route 170 in Seneca, Illinois looking north

Illinois 170 is a rural, two-lane surface road for its entire length. The road crosses Illinois River via a four-span truss bridge. As of May 5, 2006, the Illinois Department of Transportation is looking to replace the 74-year-old bridge. The old bridge was imploded on November 18, 2010.

== History ==
SBI Route 160 originally ran from Red Bud to Sparta; this became Illinois Route 154 in 1937. In 1946, it replaced Illinois Route 186 (previously Illinois Route 70A) from Seneca south to Illinois Route 17 near Budd. In 1995 Illinois 170 was extended further south to Illinois 23.

== Major Intersections ==
County	Location	mi	km	Destinations	Notes
Livingston	Cornell	0.0	0.0	IL 23	
Livingston	Blackstone	7.2	11.6	IL 17	
LaSalle	Seneca	25.00	40.23	US 6 (Jackson St)	
1.000 mi = 1.609 km; 1.000 km = 0.621 mi
