= Illinois Route 174 =

State highway in Peoria County, Illinois, US

Illinois Route 174
- Former IL 174 highlighted in red

Route information
- Length: 5.3 mi (8.5 km)
- Existed: 1924–1983

Major junctions
- South end: IL 88 in Peoria
- North end: IL 91 west of Alta

Location
- Country: United States
- State: Illinois
- Counties: Peoria

Highway system
- Illinois State Highway System; Interstate; US; State; Tollways; Scenic
← IL 173	→ IL 175

Illinois Route 174 (IL 174) was a state highway in Illinois from 1924 to 1983. The route connected IL 88 (now IL 40) and IL 91 through the community of Alta. IL 174 was established in 1924 as part of the later series of State Bond Issue (SBI) Routes. It was decommissioned in 1983.

== Route description ==
IL 174 began in Peoria at the intersection of N. Knoxville Avenue, which carried IL 88, and W. Pioneer Parkway. IL 174 headed west on W. Pioneer Parkway to the south of Mount Hawley Auxiliary Airport. It turned north onto Allen Road and headed towards Alta. Near an abandoned Rock Island Railroad line, the highway turned to the northwest and into Alta. Northwest of the town, the highway straightened to the west. It ended at a T intersection with IL 91.

== Major intersections ==
The entire route was in Peoria County.

Location	mi	km	Destinations	Notes
Peoria	0.0	0.0	IL 88	Now IL 40
Radnor Township	5.3	8.5	IL 91	
1.000 mi = 1.609 km; 1.000 km = 0.621 mi
