= Illinois Route 65 =

Former state highway in Illinois, US

Illinois Route 65
- Ogden Road

Route information
- Existed: 1932–1971

Major junctions
- West end: US 30 Bus. in Aurora
- US 34 near Naperville
- East end: US 34 in Naperville

Location
- Country: United States
- State: Illinois
- Counties: Kane, DuPage

Highway system
- Illinois State Highway System; Interstate; US; State; Tollways; Scenic
← IL 64	→ US 66

Illinois Route 65 (IL 65, Illinois 65) was an east–west state highway in the Chicago metropolitan area. It traveled from U.S. Route 30 Business (US 30 Bus.) in Aurora to US 34 north of Naperville.

== Route description ==
For the latest routing, IL 65 began at US 30 Bus. in Aurora. It then traveled due eastward via present-day New York Street and Aurora Avenue. During this travel, IL 65 intersected IL 59 and US 34 west of Naperville. As it reached downtown Naperville, it then traveled due north via Washington Street until it ended at US 34.

== History ==
In 1932, IL 65 was formed. It initially traveled from US 30 (initially concurrent with IL 22) to US 32 (initially concurrent with IL 18; later US 34). By 1934, it was extended from both ends; west from US 30 to Oswego and east from US 32 west of Naperville to US 32 north of Naperville. This routing made it a bypass of Aurora. As of 1935, part of US 32 from Sheffield to Chicago became part of US 34. In 1936, part of US 34 in Naperville switched place with part of IL 65 that bypassed Naperville. By 1939, another part of the US 34 designation switched place with another part of the IL 65 designation west of Naperville. However, IL 65 ended in downtown Aurora instead. In 1954, the routing became truncated as part of it in Aurora became a one-way road for US 30 (later US 30 City in 1959 and then later US 30 Bus. after 1960). It eventually became decommissioned as of 1971.

== Major intersections ==
This junction list is based on the latest routing of IL 65 before its decommissioning.

County	Location	mi	km	Destinations	Notes
Kane	Aurora	0.0	0.0	US 30 Bus.	Western terminus of IL 65
DuPage	Aurora			IL 59	
DuPage	Naperville	8.7	14.0	US 34	
DuPage	Naperville			US 34	Eastern terminus of IL 65
1.000 mi = 1.609 km; 1.000 km = 0.621 mi
