= Illinois Route 175 =

Former state highway in Peoria County, Illinois, US

Illinois Route 175
- Former IL 175 highlighted in red

Route information
- Maintained by IDOT
- Length: 2 mi (3.2 km)
- Existed: 1924–1930s

Major junctions
- South end: US 24 / IL 9 near Glasford
- North end: Glasford

Location
- Country: United States
- State: Illinois
- Counties: Peoria

Highway system
- Illinois State Highway System; Interstate; US; State; Tollways; Scenic
← IL 174	→ IL 176

Illinois Route 175 was a state highway in Peoria County, Illinois during the 1930s.

== Route description ==
The route was a short spur from U.S. Route 24 and Illinois Route 9 to the village of Glasford.

== History ==
Route 175 was established in 1924 as part of the later series of State Bond Issue (SBI) Routes. It was decommissioned in the early 1930s, and by 1935 the road became unnumbered. To this day, County Road R33 still sits at this particular roadway.

== Major intersections ==
The entire route was in Peoria County.

Location	mi	km	Destinations	Notes
			US 24 / IL 9	
Glasford			Road ended	
1.000 mi = 1.609 km; 1.000 km = 0.621 mi
