= Mossville, Illinois =

Mossville
- Census-designated place
- Location of Mossville Mossville (Illinois)
- Coordinates: 40°48′59″N 89°34′14″W
- Country: United States
- State: Illinois
- County: Peoria
- Township: Medina
- Established: 1855
- Elevation: 479 ft (146 m)
- Time zone: UTC-6 (CST)
  - Summer (DST): UTC-5 (CDT)
- ZIP Code: 61552
- Area code: 309
- Telephone prefix: 579
- GNIS feature ID: 2804095

Mossville is an unincorporated community and census-designated place (CDP) between Peoria and Chillicothe in Peoria County, Illinois, United States. Mossville is part of the Peoria, Illinois Metropolitan Statistical Area and resides closely to the northern part of Peoria. As of the 2020 census, Mossville had a population of 268.

Centered on the Illinois River valley and the end of Illinois Route 6 at Illinois Route 29, Mossville informally encompasses a number of different neighborhoods along the valley: Renchville, Brookview, a cluster of houses along the Illinois River referred to as "The Lanes" (though "The Lanes" are in the Peoria zip code of 61615), and Cedar Hills Estates, as well as the unincorporated village of 900 that can be considered Mossville proper. The Lake of the Woods subdivision, as well as Colony Point, both on the west bluff of the Illinois River valley overlooking Mossville, can also be considered to be part of the greater Mossville area. It was previously served by the Rock Island Line at Mossville Station. It is named for one of its original landowners, William S. Moss.

== Development ==
The Mossville post office was first established on April 19, 1855.

The historic Grant's Inn building was standing before Abraham Lincoln gave his famous Peoria Speech at the Peoria County Courthouse in downtown Peoria.

Caterpillar Inc. located its Technical Research Center (Tech Center) in Mossville in the 1960s, and subsequently put production facilities (the Mossville plant, most of which no longer exists, due to Caterpillar relocating these facilities/jobs) there as well. Caterpillar Electronics as well as the global mining technologies research and development are also located at Mossville. A co-operated Ameren/Caterpillar generation plant and a small industrial park also sits near the factories.

== Culture ==
Mossville Junior High and Elementary School is part of Illinois Valley Central Unit District 321. The census-designated place is in the district.

The Mossville United Methodist Church is situated on the west side of the Illinois Route 6 overpass on Mossville Road. This is the only church located in the township limits of Mossville.

The Mossville ZIP Code is 61552. The small post office, next to the Marathon gas station, does not have delivery routes. Locations within a few blocks of the post office have only post office boxes; locations further out are served by rural delivery from the Chillicothe (61523) or Dunlap (61525) post offices and have postal addresses that reflect this.

== Demographics ==
Historical population
| Census | Pop. | Note | %± |
|---|---|---|---|
| 2020 | 268 | | — |
U.S. Decennial Census

Mossville first appeared as a census designated place in the 2020 U.S. census.

Mossville CDP, Illinois – Racial and ethnic composition Note: the US Census treats Hispanic/Latino as an ethnic category. This table excludes Latinos from the racial categories and assigns them to a separate category. Hispanics/Latinos may be of any race.
| Race / Ethnicity (NH = Non-Hispanic) | Pop 2020 | 2020 |
|---|---|---|
| White alone (NH) | 222 | 82.84% |
| Black or African American alone (NH) | 5 | 1.87% |
| Native American or Alaska Native alone (NH) | 2 | 0.75% |
| Asian alone (NH) | 8 | 2.99% |
| Native Hawaiian or Pacific Islander alone (NH) | 0 | 0.00% |
| Other race alone (NH) | 2 | 0.75% |
| Mixed race or Multiracial (NH) | 16 | 5.97% |
| Hispanic or Latino (any race) | 13 | 4.85% |
| Total | 268 | 100.00% |

== See also ==
- Lake of the Woods (subdivision)
- Rome, Illinois
- Mossville Station
