= Illinois Route 73 =

State highway in northwestern Illinois, US

Illinois Route 73
- Illinois Route 73 highlighted in red

Route information
- Maintained by IDOT
- Length: 29.32 mi (47.19 km)
- Existed: 1924–present

Major junctions
- South end: US 52 / IL 64 in Lanark
- US 20 in Lena
- North end: CTH-M in Winslow

Location
- Country: United States
- State: Illinois
- Counties: Carroll, Stephenson

Highway system
- Illinois State Highway System; Interstate; US; State; Tollways; Scenic
← IL 72	→ I-74

Illinois Route 73 is a north–south state highway in northwest Illinois. It runs from the U.S. Route 52/Illinois Route 64 concurrency south of Lanark north to the Wisconsin border north of Winslow. This is a distance of 29.32 miles (47.19 km).

== Route description ==
Illinois 73 is a two-lane surface road for its entire length. At its northern terminus, Illinois 73 becomes County Highway M in Green County, Wisconsin. This is the only Illinois state highway that does not either continue as another state highway, or end at a ferry crossing (current or former).

== History ==
SBI Route 73 existed from Illinois Route 72 north of Lanark to Winslow. Around 1982, it replaced Illinois 72 from north of Lanark south to U.S. Route 52.

== Major intersections ==
County	Location	mi	km	Destinations	Notes
Carroll	Lanark	0.00	0.00	US 52 / IL 64 – Mount Carroll, Brookville	Southern terminus of IL 73
Carroll	Lanark	4.2	6.8	IL 72 – Shannon	Western terminus of IL 72
Stephenson	Lena	18.1	29.1	US 20 – Stockton, Freeport	
Stephenson	Winslow	29.32	47.19	CTH-M – Martintown	Continuation into Wisconsin
1.000 mi = 1.609 km; 1.000 km = 0.621 mi
