= Groveland Township =

Groveland Township may refer to:

- Groveland Township, LaSalle County, Illinois
- Groveland Township, Tazewell County, Illinois
- Groveland Township, McPherson County, Kansas
- Groveland Township, Michigan
- Groveland Township, Spink County, South Dakota, in Spink County, South Dakota

== See also ==
- Groveland (disambiguation)
