= Illinois Route 72 =

State highway in northern Illinois, US

Illinois Route 72
- IL 72 highlighted in red

Route information
- Maintained by IDOT and CDOT
- Length: 110.71 mi (178.17 km)
- Existed: 1924–present

Major junctions
- West end: IL 73 in Lanark
- I-39 / US 51 in Monroe Center; US 20 / IL 47 in Hampshire; I-290 / IL 53 in Schaumburg; Future I-490 in Elk Grove Village; I-90 Toll in Des Plaines; US 12 / US 45 in Des Plaines; I-90 Toll in Rosemont
- East end: I-90 / IL 43 in Chicago

Location
- Country: United States
- State: Illinois
- Counties: Carroll, Ogle, DeKalb, Kane, Cook

Highway system
- Illinois State Highway System; Interstate; US; State; Tollways; Scenic
← I-72	→ IL 73

Illinois Route 72 is an east–west state highway in northern Illinois. It runs from the intersection with Illinois Route 73 north of Lanark east to Illinois Route 43 (Harlem Avenue) in Chicago. This is a distance of 110.71 miles (178.2 km).

== Route description ==
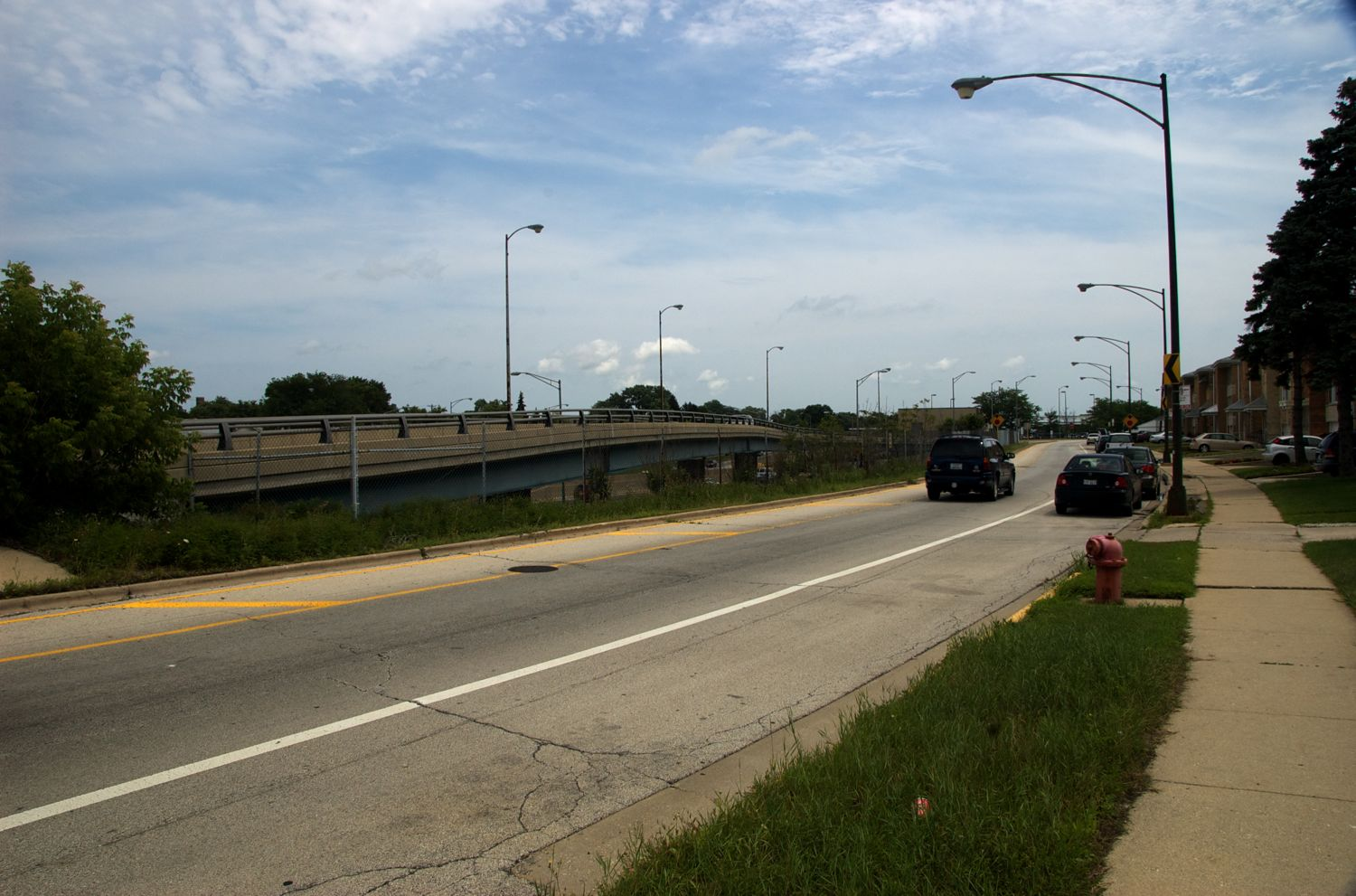
Looking east at Illinois Route 72 just west of Illinois Route 43 (Harlem Avenue). Due to a lack of right-of-way, the western lanes are routed onto a two-lane bridge over the eastbound exit ramp from Interstate 90 (Kennedy Expressway) to Harlem Avenue.

Illinois 72 is called Higgins Road for most of its length in the Chicago area, and has been redirected in parts of the area to accommodate for new features. Near Rosemont, the road has been shifted to make way for O'Hare International Airport — further east, parts of the road have been moved to make room for the Northwest Tollway (Interstate 90). The road serves as a major six-lane thoroughfare for several western suburbs, including Schaumburg, Elk Grove Village, and Hoffman Estates.

Illinois 72 runs concurrently for one block with Illinois Route 83 in Elk Grove Township, and Illinois Route 47 and U.S. Highway 20 by Starks, an unincorporated village approximately 60 miles (97 km) from Chicago. The latter is a Wrong-way concurrency, where one can be driving both west on Illinois 72 and east on U.S. 20 at the same time. West from Chicago, Illinois 72 largely parallels Interstate 90 until Starks, crossing over and under the highway six times without an intersection. On a larger scale, it is the main east–west artery to Chicago between Interstate 90 and Illinois Route 64.

It serves the towns and cities of, from west to east, Lanark, Shannon, Forreston, Leaf River, Byron, Stillman Valley, Kirkland, Kingston, Genoa, Hampshire, Gilberts, Sleepy Hollow, West Dundee, East Dundee, South Barrington, Hoffman Estates, Schaumburg, Elk Grove Village, Des Plaines, Rosemont, and Chicago. Higgins Road/Higgins Avenue continues east-southeast from Harlem Avenue in Chicago to Milwaukee Avenue near Lawrence Avenue.

Route 72 is one of seven state roads to enter the city of Chicago. It was once part of the Galena-Chicago Stagecoach Trail.

== History ==
SBI Route 72 originally ran from Lanark to Starks. It was extended east in 1937 and 1938 to East Dundee, and then to Chicago. In 1968, the designation of IL 72 was truncated back to IL 43 (Harlem Avenue), lopping off 10.5 miles (16.9 km). In 1982, it was shortened again, this time to Illinois Route 73.

The crash site of American Airlines Flight 191 is located along the road as Touhy Avenue, just north of the road and north of O'Hare International Airport near a trailer park.

== Major intersections ==
County	Location	mi	km	Destinations	Notes
Carroll	Lanark	0.00	0.00	IL 73 – Lanark, Pearl City	Western terminus of IL 72
Ogle	Forreston	10.0	16.1	IL 26 north – Freeport	West end of IL 26 concurrency
Ogle	Forreston	13.9	22.4	IL 26 south (First Avenue) – Dixon	East end of IL 26 concurrency
Ogle	Byron	29.6	47.6	IL 2 south – Oregon, Dixon	West end of IL 2 concurrency
Ogle	Byron	30.9	49.7	IL 2 north (East Blackhawk Drive) – Rockford	East end of IL 2 concurrency
Ogle	Davis Junction	40.8	65.7	IL 251 – Rochelle, Rockford	
Ogle	Monroe Center	43.5	70.0	I-39 / US 51 – LaSalle, Peru, Rockford	Exit 111 (I-39)
DeKalb	Genoa	61.7	99.3	IL 23 south (Sycamore Road) – Sycamore	West end of IL 23 concurrency
DeKalb	Genoa	63.6	102.4	IL 23 north – Marengo	East end of IL 23 concurrency
Kane	Hampshire	69.8	112.3	CR 46 (Walker Road)	
Kane	Hampshire	71.0	114.3	CR 11 south (French Road)	
Kane	Pingree Grove	73.7	118.6	US 20 east (Grant Highway) / IL 47 south – Elgin, Elburn	West end of US 20 / IL 47 concurrency
Kane	Starks	74.2	119.4	US 20 west (Grant Highway) / IL 47 north – Marengo, Huntley	East end of US 20 / IL 47 concurrency
Kane	Gilberts	77.1	124.1	CR 21 (Big Timber Road)	
Kane	Gilberts	79.4	127.8	CR 59 (Tyrrell Road)	
Kane	West Dundee	80.7	129.9	CR 34 (Randall Road) – St. Charles, Crystal Lake	
Kane	West Dundee	83.2	133.9	IL 31 (8th Street) – Elgin, Algonquin	
Kane	East Dundee	84.1	135.3	IL 68 east (Penny Avenue)	Western terminus of IL 68
Kane	East Dundee	84.8	136.5	IL 25 (Dundee Avenue) to I-90 Toll	
Cook	Sutton	88.6	142.6	IL 59 (Sutton Road) to I-90 Toll	
Cook	Hoffman Estates–Schaumburg village line	93.8	151.0	IL 58 (Golf Road)	
Cook	Schaumburg	97.2	156.4	I-290 / IL 53 to I-90 Toll / I-355 Toll / IL 58 – Chicago	Exit 1 (I-290)
Cook	Elk Grove Village	101.2	162.9	IL 83 south (Busse Road)	West end of IL 83 concurrency
Cook	Elk Grove Village	101.2	162.9	IL 83 north (West Oakton Street)	East end of IL 83 concurrency
Cook	Des Plaines			I-490 Toll (Western O'Hare Beltway)	Future Interchange
Cook	Des Plaines	105.2	169.3	I-90 Toll east (Jane Addams Memorial Tollway) – Chicago	Exit 76 (I-90); no access to I-90 west or from I-90 east
Cook	Des Plaines	106.0	170.6	US 12 / US 45 (Mannheim Road)	
Cook	Des Plaines	106.6	171.6	I-90 Toll west (Jane Addams Memorial Tollway) – Rockford	Access only
Cook	Chicago	108.7	174.9	IL 171 south (Cumberland Avenue) – River Grove	Northern terminus of IL 171
Cook	Chicago	109.4	176.1	I-90 east (Kennedy Expressway) – Rockford	Exit 80 (I-90)
Cook	Chicago	110.5	177.8	I-90 east (Kennedy Expressway) – Chicago	Exi 81A (I-90)
Cook	Chicago	110.71	178.17	IL 43 (Harlem Avenue) – Forest Park, Niles	Eastern terminus of IL 72
1.000 mi = 1.609 km; 1.000 km = 0.621 mi: Concurrency terminus; Incomplete access

== See also ==
- Galena–Chicago trail
