= Groveland =

Groveland may refer to:

== Places ==
- Groveland, California
- Groveland, Florida
- Groveland, Idaho
- Groveland, Illinois
- Groveland, Indiana
- Groveland, Kansas
- Groveland, Massachusetts
- Groveland, New York

== Other uses ==
- Groveland Correctional Facility in Livingston County, New York
- Groveland Four, term coined by the media for four African-American men accused of raping a Caucasian woman in Groveland, Florida
- Grovelands Park, Winchmore Hill, London
- Intel Groveland, codename for the Intel CE4200 processor

== See also ==
- Groveland Township (disambiguation)
