= Illinois Route 118 =

Former state highway in Illinois, US

Illinois Route 118

Route information
- Existed: 1935–1938

Major junctions
- West end: IL 64 in Elmhurst
- IL 54 in Elmhurst; US 45 in Bellwood
- East end: US 20 in Maywood

Location
- Country: United States
- State: Illinois
- Counties: DuPage, Cook

Highway system
- Illinois State Highway System; Interstate; US; State; Tollways; Scenic
← IL 117	→ IL 119

Illinois Route 118 (IL 118) was an east–west state highway in Illinois. Located in the Chicago metropolitan area, the route traveled from Elmhurst to Maywood primarily along St. Charles Road.

== Route description ==
IL 118 began at IL 64 (North Avenue) and traveled south along West Avenue. IL 118 then traveled eastward along St. Charles Road, serving the municipalities of Berkeley, Bellwood, and Maywood. IL 118 briefly travels north along 5th Avenue before ending at US 20 (Lake Street).

== History ==
IL 118 first appeared in 1929 to connect from US 66/IL 4 in Pontiac to IL 17 (now IL 18)/IL 23 in Streator through Cornell. By 1935, IL 118 was supplanted by an extension of IL 23.

Before 1935, IL 64 used to travel along St. Charles Road from Elmhurst to Maywood. Then, in 1935, IL 64 was realigned to travel along North Avenue, absorbing part of IL 54; IL 54 instead traveled north along York Road and present-day IL 83 and US 45. With the realignment of IL 64, IL 118 was created. In 1938, without any intermediate changes, IL 118 was removed.

== Major intersections ==
County	Location	mi	km	Destinations	Notes
DuPage	Elmhurst			IL 64 (North Avenue)	Western terminus
DuPage	Elmhurst			IL 54 (York Road)	Now unnumbered (IL 54 bypassed downtown Elmhurst in 1939 and was renumbered as IL 83 in 1941)
Cook	Bellwood			US 45 (LaGrange Road)	Now US 12/US 20/US 45 (Mannheim Road)
Cook	Maywood			US 20 (Lake Street)	Eastern terminus; now unnumbered (was replaced with US 20 City in 1938)
1.000 mi = 1.609 km; 1.000 km = 0.621 mi
