= Sunbury Township, Livingston County, Illinois =

Coordinates: 41°04′11″N 88°38′00″W

Sunbury Township
- Township
- Location in Livingston County

- Livingston County's location in Illinois
- Country: United States
- State: Illinois
- County: Livingston
- Established: November 3, 1857

Area
  - Total: 36.5 sq mi (95 km^{2})
  - Land: 36.5 sq mi (95 km^{2})
  - Water: 0 sq mi (0 km^{2}) 0%

Population (2020)
  - Total: 246
  - Density: 6.74/sq mi (2.60/km^{2})
- Time zone: UTC-6 (CST)
  - Summer (DST): UTC-5 (CDT)
- FIPS code: 17-105-73781

Sunbury Township is located in Livingston County, Illinois. As of the 2020 census, its population was 246 and it contained 95 housing units.

== Geography ==
According to the 2021 census gazetteer files, Sunbury Township has a total area of 36.50 square miles (94.53 km^{2}), all land. The township consists primarily of farmland.

== Demographics ==
As of the 2020 census there were 246 people, 64 households, and 36 families residing in the township. The population density was 6.74 inhabitants per square mile (2.60/km^{2}). There were 95 housing units at an average density of 2.60 per square mile (1.00/km^{2}). The racial makeup of the township was 89.84% White, 0.81% African American, 0.81% Native American, 0.00% Asian, 0.00% Pacific Islander, 2.03% from other races, and 6.50% from two or more races. Hispanic or Latino of any race were 6.10% of the population.

There were 64 households, out of which 3.10% had children under the age of 18 living with them, 56.25% were married couples living together, 0.00% had a female householder with no spouse present, and 43.75% were non-families. 29.70% of all households were made up of individuals, and 14.10% had someone living alone who was 65 years of age or older. The average household size was 1.98 and the average family size was 2.53.

According to the 2020 American Community Survey, township's age distribution consisted of 4.7% under the age of 18, 7.1% from 18 to 24, 29.2% from 25 to 44, 40.1% from 45 to 64, and 18.9% who were 65 years of age or older. The median age was 49.2 years. For every 100 females, there were 110.3 males. For every 100 females age 18 and over, there were 118.8 males.

The median income for a household in the township was $58,958. Males had a median income of $47,273 versus $41,250 for females. The per capita income for the township was $36,149. About 0.0% of families and 7.9% of the population were below the poverty line, including 0.0% of those under age 18 and 8.3% of those age 65 or over.

Historical population
Census	Pop.	Note	%±
2000	235		—
2010	229		−2.6%
2020	246		7.4%
U.S. Decennial Census

== History ==
Sunbury Township was named by William K. Brown after his former town in Pennsylvania. The township was organized April 6, 1858, by the election of J. O. Corey as supervisor; J. S. Cumming, clerk; T. F. Norton, assessor; A. S. Blakeslee, collector; Andrew Sprague, John Gower and R. C. Myer as commissioner of highways; Isaac Ames and A. J. Hopkins, constables. Only 19 votes were cast at the election.

=== Early Settlers ===
The early settlers of Sunbury Township found mostly rolling prairie with little timber. Early settlement was primarily near Mud Creek in the southwest corner of the township.

Andrew Sprague was the first known settler in the township. He was a native of New York. He arrived in 1835 and located his claim in timber on the banks of Mud Creek. Andrew's brother, Ephraim, briefly settled in area before moving on.

John V. Hilton settled in the area in 1842 making the journey overland from Buffalo, New York. He was a soldier in the War of 1812.

Jacob Longnecker and his family arrived in the township in 1844. He was born in Pennsylvania, but had lived several years in Kentucky and Indiana. He traveled overland with horse and oxen, bringing his sheep, cattle and hogs with him. He first lived in a cabin which had been erected by Ephraim Sprague. He and his son Sylvester built a new home and the cabin was converted into a blacksmith shop.

E. G. Rice settled in the area in 1847. He was a native of Maine which he left in 1845 staying a year in Michigan and then a year in Kendall County, Illinois. He would later move on to southern Illinois. His son, George, became a resident of Pontiac, Illinois.

Luther Smith also arrived in 1847. He settled out on the prairie two miles south of where the town of Blackstone is now located. His farm had always been known as "Smith’s Mound."

James Hill and family and James P. Hadley and wife settled in 1848. Hadley was one of the organizers of the township and assisted in appraising the school lands in 1853. The lands ranging from $5 to $8 per acre in value. He also assisted in organizing the districts of road and school purpose. John Blackmore and son Henry came here in 1849, having previously lived in Danville and Ottawa, Illinois.

Asa Blakeslee, Thomas F. Norton, B. F. Norton, Isaac Ames, J. O Corey, Erastus Corey, Ansel Gammon, M. W. Gammon and C. D. Gammon were among the settlers in the years 1852–53. Blakeslee took up a claim on the prairie in the central part of the township where there were no other settlers. He bought 200 head of cattle since there was plenty of empty pastureland. He bought lumber in Ottawa, Illinois that he transported to his claim to build his home and farm buildings.

Thomas F. Norton was a native of Maine and settled in the northeastern part of the township. After a short residence in the township, he was elected county surveyor in 1854 and served as township assessor 1858 to 1861. He also served as school treasurer. In 1862, Norton was ordained a minister of the Baptist church. Isaac Ames was also a native of Maine. He served as supervisor in 1861 and 1864, and as collector in 1859.

J. O. Corey and his brother Erastus were from Pennsylvania. J. O. Corey had been an officer in the Mexican War. He was the first Supervisor of Sunbury Township, being elected in 1858. He also held the office 1874 to 1876. He moved on to Iowa in 1876. Erastus was a carpenter who came to the area in the employ of the railroad. He later returned to his home state.

In 1854, two railroads, the Chicago & Alton and the Illinois Central, were completed through central Illinois. This opened the area to immigrants and also to the laborers who had worked on the railroad line construction.

Anderson Corbin and Oliver Corbin arrived in April 1855 from Virginia. For several years they were the village blacksmiths. John Gower and his son Bailey A. Gower arrived from LaSalle County about 1856. They were natives of Maine. The former was supervisor in 1859, 1860 and 1863, and the latter during the years of 1866 and 1869.

Erastus Thatcher and H. H. Brower also arrived in 1855. Brower was a lawyer and practiced in the courts of the county. He served as supervisor during the years 1862 and 1868.

At the first election for county officers held November 6, 1858, there were 34 votes cast in the township. At the judicial election held in May of the following year, 48 votes were cast. The census of 1870 gave the township 891 inhabitants.

== Education ==
=== Schools ===
The first school house in the township was built in 1836 near the Sprague homestead. The first teacher was Catharine Sprague, mother of Andrew and Ephraim. This was twenty years before the state public school system was adopted. The school was private and maintained by subscription. The Hilton school was built in 1855 and the Ames school in 1856.

The report of Thomas F. Norton, the first school treasurer, shows that “in 1855 there was but one school, thirty-four scholars in attendance, ninety-two children in the township, and but one teacher; the highest wages paid was $12 per month, and the whole amount paid out for school purposes was $38.75; there were but 107 school books in all the houses, sixty-five of which were elementary spellers.”

== Post Office ==
In the early years, the settlers received their mail at the little post office in Esmen Township which was on the mail route from Danville to Ottawa, Illinois. The post office was called Sunbury and kept at the William K. Brown residence. It was afterward moved to the home of Andrew Sprague. In 1870, when the town of Blackstone was established in Sunbury Township, the post office was moved there.

== Cemeteries ==
There are three cemeteries in the township – Blackstone cemetery, located one-half mile west and one-half mile south of the village; Jones’ cemetery, located in the southeast quarter of section 21; Hadley cemetery, located in the southwest quarter of section 33.

== Churches ==
The United Methodist Church in Blackstone was built in 1879. St. Bernard's Catholic Church was built in 1880 on the northeast quarter of section 10, one-half mile south of the village of Budd.

== Railroads ==
There were two railroads that crossed the northern section of Sunbury Township. The western extension of the Chicago & Alton Railroad passed through Blackstone and the Three-I Railroad (now CSX) passed through Budd.

== Communities ==
- Blackstone
- Budd

== Points of Interest ==
- Sunbury Railroad Prairie Nature Preserve
