= Illinois Route 58 =

State highway in Kane and Cook Counties, Illinois, US

Illinois Route 58
- Golf Road; Evanston-Elgin Road
- IL 58 highlighted in red

Route information
- Maintained by IDOT
- Length: 28.3 mi (45.5 km)
- Existed: 1924–present

Major junctions
- West end: IL 25 in Elgin
- I-290 / IL 53 in Schaumburg; US 14 in Des Plaines; US 12 in Des Plaines; US 45 in Des Plaines I-294 Toll in Glenview; US 14 / IL 43 in Morton Grove; I-94 in Skokie
- East end: US 41 in Skokie

Location
- Country: United States
- State: Illinois
- Counties: Kane, Cook

Highway system
- Illinois State Highway System; Interstate; US; State; Tollways; Scenic
← IL 57	→ IL 59

Illinois Route 58 (IL 58, Illinois 58), also known as Golf Road for most of its route, is a state highway in northeast Illinois. It runs from Illinois Route 25 (Liberty Street) in Elgin east to U.S. Route 41 (Skokie Boulevard) in Skokie. This is a distance of 27.88 miles (44.87 km).

== Route description ==
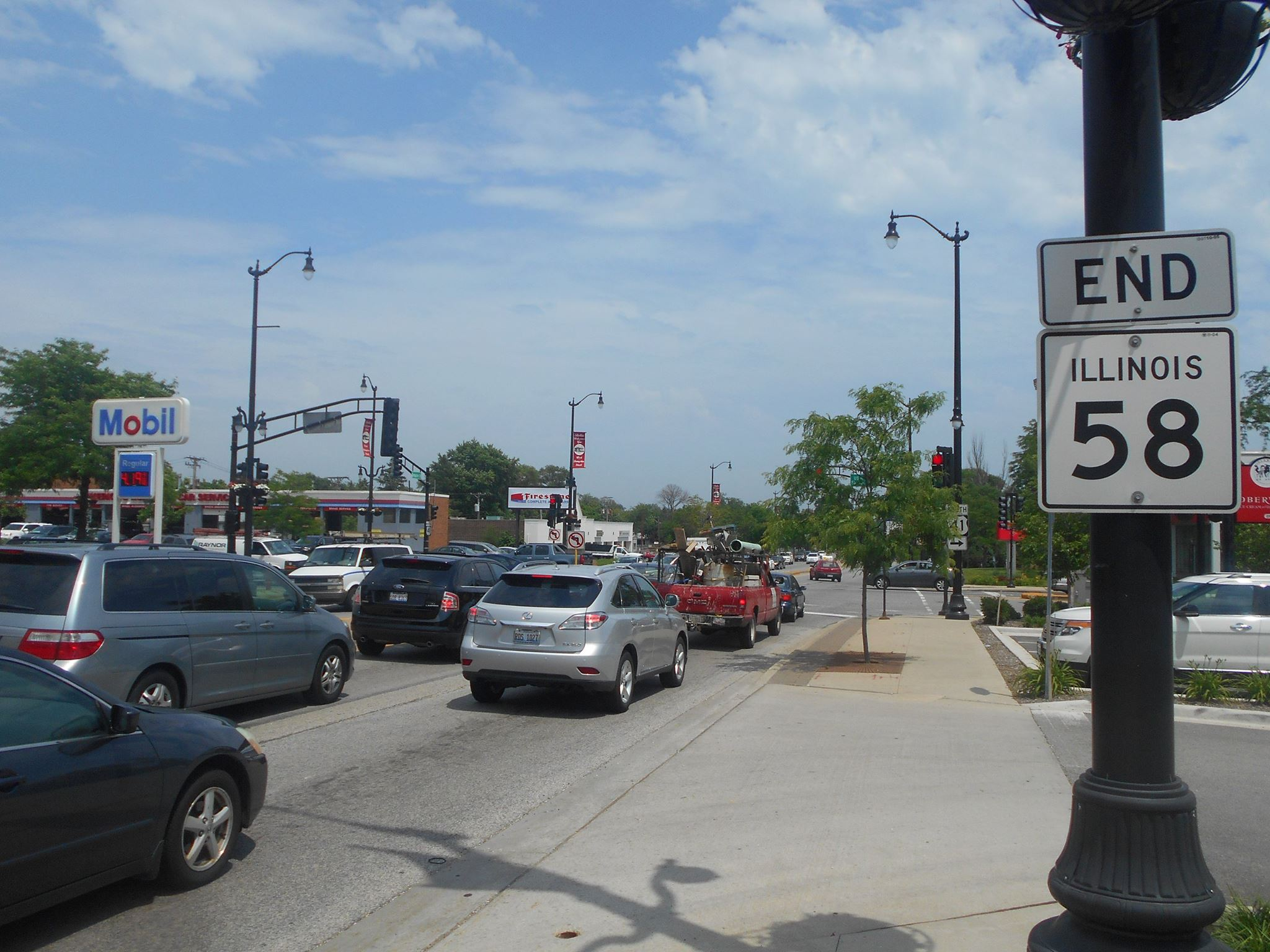
Signage on IL 58 informing drivers of its eastern terminus at US 41 in Skokie

It is four-lane road for most of its length, and six lanes through a very high-traffic corridor between Hoffman Estates and Schaumburg. The only section that is not multilane is from just east of Waverly Drive in Elgin to just west of Barrington Road in Hoffman Estates.

Starting in Elgin, the road is called Summit Street. Just east of Rohrssen Road in Hoffman Estates, the road is named Golf Road, which the route is commonly called locally, after the minuscule town of Golf that the route passes through.

The junction of Illinois 58 and Illinois Route 72 (Higgins Road) in Hoffman Estates form one of the only six-lane by six-lane sharply angled intersections in the state. Left turns used to be prohibited from Golf Road onto Higgins Road because of the sharp angle, but recent road construction has made a separate lane for doing this in both directions.

In Des Plaines, Illinois 58 and U.S. 14 (as the Northwest Highway here) use other minor feeder roads to provide access to each other. The feeder roads are accessible via a two-lane traffic circle north of the overpass.

The road continues to run east from Golf towards Skokie, turning south and running concurrent with Illinois Route 43 (Waukegan Road) before displacing U.S. Route 14 at Dempster Street as it turns back east towards U.S. 41.

== History ==
SBI Route 58 is the same as it was in 1924, with parts of it called the Evanston-Elgin Road. Before 1972, it terminated at Sheridan Road (then part of IL 42). In 1972, it was dropped east of U.S. 41. In 1981, US 20 Business in Elgin was decommissioned. As a result, IL 58 was dropped west of IL 25.

== Junction list ==
County	Location	mi	km	Destinations	Notes
Kane	Elgin	0.0	0.0	IL 25 (Liberty Street)	Western terminus of IL 58
Cook	Hoffman Estates	3.8	6.1	IL 59 (Sutton Road)	
Cook	Hoffman Estates–Schaumburg village line	8.9	14.3	IL 72 (Higgins Road)	Left turn permitted
Cook	Schaumburg–Rolling Meadows city line	12.6	20.3	I-290 / IL 53 to I-90 Toll	I-290 exit 1
Cook	Arlington Heights	14.1	22.7	IL 62 (Algonquin Road)	
Cook	Mount Prospect–Des Plaines city line	16.9	27.2	IL 83 (Elmhurst Road)	
Cook	Des Plaines	18.5	29.8	US 14 (Miner Street, Northwest Highway, Ronald Reagan Highway)	Access via State Street/Broadway Street
Cook	Des Plaines	19.3	31.1	US 12 (Rand Road)	
Cook	Des Plaines	19.8	31.9	US 45 (Des Plaines River Road)	
Cook	Des Plaines	20.8	33.5	I-294 Toll north (Tri-State Tollway) – Wisconsin	No access from or to I-294 south; I-294 exit 45
Cook	Niles	22.3	35.9	IL 21 (Milwaukee Avenue)	
Cook	Morton Grove	24.3	39.1	IL 43 north (Waukegan Road)	North end of IL 43 overlap
Cook	Morton Grove	25.3	40.7	US 14 (Ronald Reagan Highway) / IL 43 south (Waukegan Road)	South end of IL 43 overlap
Cook	Skokie	27.2	43.8	I-94 (Edens Expressway)	I-94 exit 37
Cook	Skokie	28.04	45.13	US 41 (Skokie Boulevard)	Eastern terminus of IL 58
1.000 mi = 1.609 km; 1.000 km = 0.621 mi: Concurrency terminus; Incomplete access
