= Peoria station (Rock Island Line) =

Peoria
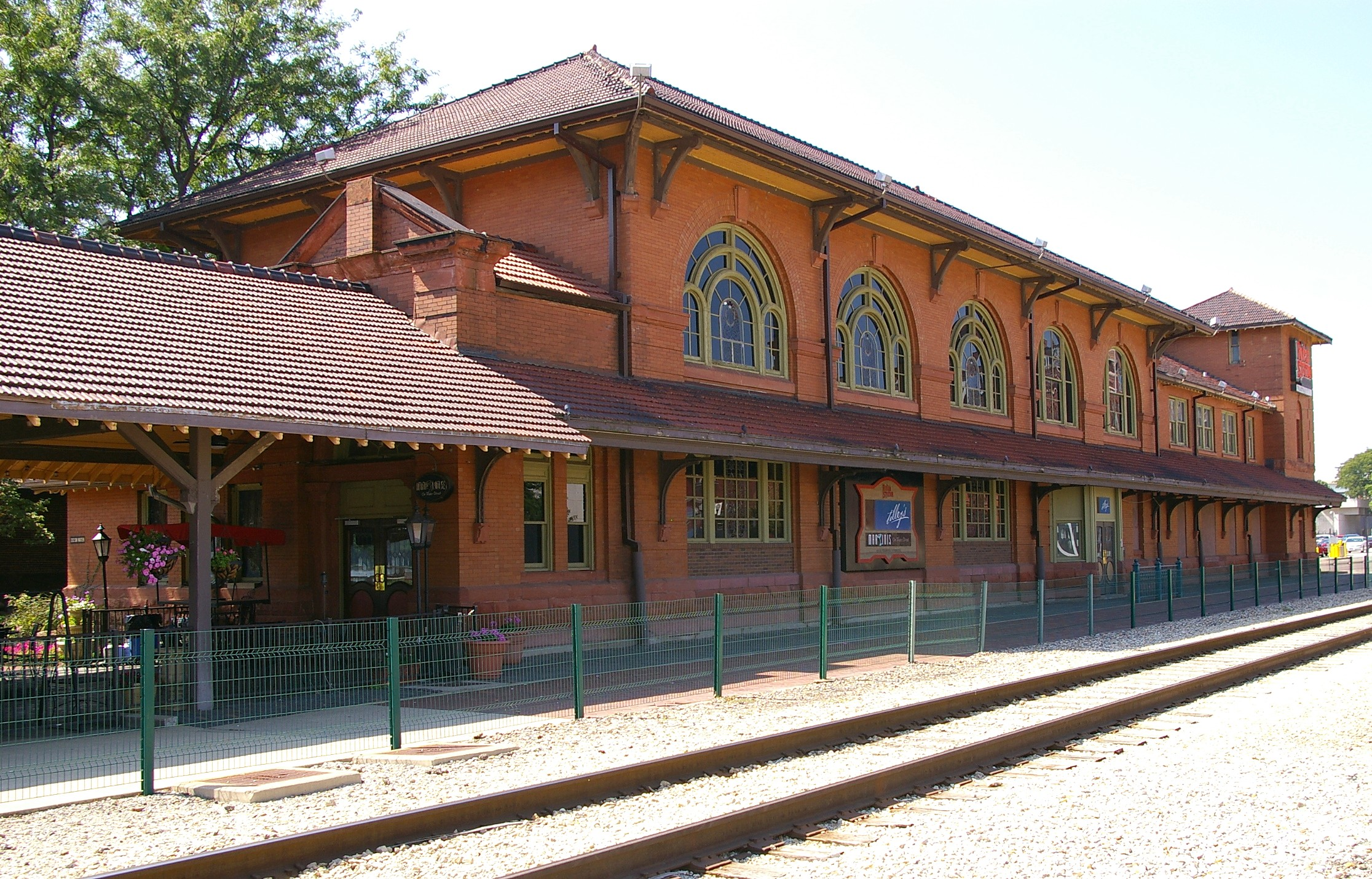

General information
- Location: 32 Liberty Street, Peoria, Illinois 61602
- System: Former Rock Island Line passenger rail station

History
- Opened: 1899–1900
- Closed: 1978

Services
Preceding station	Chicago, Rock Island and Pacific Railroad	Following station
Terminus	Bureau – Peoria	Mossville toward Bureau
- Rock Island Depot and Freight House
- U.S. National Register of Historic Places
- City of Peoria Local Historic Landmark
- Location within Peoria County, Illinois
- Location: 32 Liberty St., Peoria, Illinois
- Coordinates: 40°41′18″N 89°35′24″W
- Area: less than one acre
- Built: 1899-1900
- Architectural style: Neo-Renaissance, Classical Revival, Italian Villa
- NRHP reference No.: 78001180
- Added to NRHP: December 22, 1978
Location

The Rock Island Depot and Freight House is a two-story railroad station and adjacent one-story freight house from the turn of the 20th century. It was constructed in 1899 directly besides the Illinois River in the American city of Peoria, Illinois. The depot and freight house are one of Peoria's last remaining historic reminders of the importance of passenger trains in the city's past, the other being the newer (1967) Rock Island station at 121 Morton Street now owned by the City of Peoria. The depot was built by the Chicago, Rock Island and Pacific Railroad as the terminus of a major branch line that delivered significant goods and passengers to Peoria. The 1900 opening of the depot was attended by "throngs of populous;" at its height before the depression of the 1880s, Peoria was a transportation hub. The station's clock tower was removed in 1939. The buildings were listed on the U.S. National Register of Historic Places in 1978. The last Rock Island train out of the station was the Peoria Rocket in 1978, of the company's Rock Island Rockets series.

After the end of train service, the building became known as River Station, and has been a restaurant, and afterwards a set of restaurants and bars. Currently the building is occupied by Martinis On Water Street, and The Blue Duck Barbecue Tavern. It is adjacent to the Peoria Riverfront Museum.

== See also ==
- Prairie Marksman
- Rock Island Rockets
- Peoria Union Station — demolished station to the southwest
