= Garfield, Illinois =

- Unincorporated community
- Location within Illinois Location within the United States
- Coordinates: 41°05′06″N 88°57′22″W
- Country: United States
- State: Illinois
- County: LaSalle
- Township: Osage
- Elevation: 666 ft (203 m)
- Time zone: UTC-6 (Central (CST))
  - Summer (DST): UTC-5 (CDT)
- Area codes: 815 & 779
- GNIS feature ID: 408890

Garfield is an unincorporated community located in Osage Township in LaSalle County, Illinois, United States, located in the panhandle of LaSalle County. It is also a part of the geographic region known as Streatorland.

Garfield is named for James A. Garfield, 20th President of the United States.
