= Peru Township, LaSalle County, Illinois =

Coordinates: 41°19′28″N 89°08′06″W

Peru Township
- Township
- Location in LaSalle County

- LaSalle County's location in Illinois
- Country: United States
- State: Illinois
- County: LaSalle
- Established: September 27, 1856

Area
  - Total: 17.98 sq mi (46.6 km^{2})
  - Land: 17.48 sq mi (45.3 km^{2})
  - Water: 0.51 sq mi (1.3 km^{2}) 2.81%

Population (2020)
  - Total: 10,191
  - Density: 583.0/sq mi (225.1/km^{2})
- Time zone: UTC-6 (CST)
  - Summer (DST): UTC-5 (CDT)
- FIPS code: 17-099-59247
- Website: perutownshipil.com

Peru Township is located in LaSalle County, Illinois. As of the 2020 census, its population was 10,191 and it contained 4,948 housing units. Peru Township was originally named Salisbury Township, but was changed on September 27, 1856.

== Geography ==
According to the 2021 census gazetteer files, Peru Township has a total area of 17.98 square miles (46.57 km^{2}), of which 17.48 square miles (45.27 km^{2}) (or 97.19%) is land and 0.51 square miles (1.32 km^{2}) (or 2.81%) is water.

== Demographics ==
As of the 2020 census there were 10,191 people, 4,600 households, and 2,857 families residing in the township. The population density was 566.73 inhabitants per square mile (218.82/km^{2}). There were 4,948 housing units at an average density of 275.16 per square mile (106.24/km^{2}). The racial makeup of the township was 87.04% White, 1.30% African American, 0.23% Native American, 1.70% Asian, 0.03% Pacific Islander, 2.62% from other races, and 7.09% from two or more races. Hispanic or Latino of any race were 9.28% of the population.

There were 4,600 households, out of which 25.40% had children under the age of 18 living with them, 48.76% were married couples living together, 10.67% had a female householder with no spouse present, and 37.89% were non-families. 34.30% of all households were made up of individuals, and 16.90% had someone living alone who was 65 years of age or older. The average household size was 2.13 and the average family size was 2.64.

The township's age distribution consisted of 19.1% under the age of 18, 6.0% from 18 to 24, 20.6% from 25 to 44, 27% from 45 to 64, and 27.4% who were 65 years of age or older. The median age was 49.7 years. For every 100 females, there were 85.2 males. For every 100 females age 18 and over, there were 85.8 males.

The median income for a household in the township was $53,953, and the median income for a family was $73,262. Males had a median income of $50,089 versus $24,593 for females. The per capita income for the township was $34,158. About 6.0% of families and 10.9% of the population were below the poverty line, including 22.3% of those under age 18 and 3.0% of those age 65 or over.

Historical population
Census	Pop.	Note	%±
2010	10,732		—
2020	10,191		−5.0%
U.S. Decennial Census
