= Meriden, Illinois =

- Unincorporated community
- Location in Illinois Location in the United States
- Coordinates: 41°34′14″N 89°02′06″W
- Country: United States
- State: Illinois
- County: LaSalle
- Township: Meriden
- Elevation: 724 ft (221 m)
- Time zone: UTC-6 (CST)
  - Summer (DST): UTC-5 (CDT)

Meriden, IL

Meriden is an unincorporated community in LaSalle County, Illinois, and is located east of Mendota. The community has East 7th Street running north–south through the community, and North 44th Street making a T-intersection south of Meriden with East 7th Street. U.S. Highway 34 runs about an eighth of a mile south of Meriden. It is located in Meriden township.

Township 36, Range 2, constitutes the town of Meriden. It is bounded on the north by the north line of the county, and is a prairie region, surrounded by prairie on all sides except a small grove on Sees. 5 and 6, called Four-Mile Grove. A few families pitched their tents around the little oasis in the middle of the wide prairie, in the year 1836, and these were all the early settlers.

John Haight settled on Webster's farm near Peru, first, and came to Meriden in 1836.

- David Peck, from Albany County, N.Y., settled on Sec. 6, in 1836; sold to Cunningham.
- Lyman Alger, from the same place, in 1836; sold to Mclntyre.
- O. W. Bryant came from Maine to Peru, in 1837, and to Meriden in 1842.
- Benjamin Furman came from Tioga County, Pa.; settled on S. 6, in 1838.
- George Wilkinson, from the same place, settled on the same Section at the same time.
- Benjamin Birdsall came from New York, in 1839.
- E. R. Wicks settled on S. 18, in 1848.
- David Holden settled on the same Section in 1849.
- Ira Bailey came in 1848.
- John Rose, from Scotland, James Cunningham, Hiram Cristler, John Weisner, Thomas Eager and a few others constituted the pioneer force that commenced the task of transforming the wild prairie town into productive farms and the quiet pleasant abode of a numerous, wealthy and prosperous people-a task that with the aid of succeeding emigrants has been most successfully accomplished.
