= Deer Park Township, LaSalle County, Illinois =

Coordinates: 41°17′14″N 88°59′35″W

Deer Park Township
- Township
- Location in LaSalle County

- LaSalle County's location in Illinois
- Country: United States
- State: Illinois
- County: LaSalle
- Established: November 6, 1849

Area
  - Total: 33.03 sq mi (85.5 km^{2})
  - Land: 31.33 sq mi (81.1 km^{2})
  - Water: 1.70 sq mi (4.4 km^{2}) 5.14%

Population (2020)
  - Total: 459
  - Density: 14.7/sq mi (5.66/km^{2})
- Time zone: UTC-6 (CST)
  - Summer (DST): UTC-5 (CDT)
- FIPS code: 17-099-19096

Deer Park Township is located in LaSalle County, Illinois. As of the 2020 census, its population was 459 and it contained 211 housing units.

== Geography ==
According to the 2021 census gazetteer files, Deer Park Township has a total area of 33.03 square miles (85.55 km^{2}), of which 31.33 square miles (81.14 km^{2}) (or 94.86%) is land and 1.70 square miles (4.40 km^{2}) (or 5.14%) is water.

== Demographics ==
As of the 2020 census there were 459 people, 225 households, and 163 families residing in the township. The population density was 13.90 inhabitants per square mile (5.37/km^{2}). There were 211 housing units at an average density of 6.39 per square mile (2.47/km^{2}). The racial makeup of the township was 94.12% White, 0.87% African American, 0.22% Native American, 0.00% Asian, 0.00% Pacific Islander, 0.87% from other races, and 3.92% from two or more races. Hispanic or Latino of any race were 4.79% of the population.

There were 225 households, out of which 30.20% had children under the age of 18 living with them, 65.78% were married couples living together, 3.11% had a female householder with no spouse present, and 27.56% were non-families. 27.60% of all households were made up of individuals, and 20.90% had someone living alone who was 65 years of age or older. The average household size was 2.44 and the average family size was 2.91.

The township's age distribution consisted of 22.2% under the age of 18, 6.0% from 18 to 24, 17.9% from 25 to 44, 29.3% from 45 to 64, and 24.7% who were 65 years of age or older. The median age was 49.3 years. For every 100 females, there were 103.0 males. For every 100 females age 18 and over, there were 94.5 males.

The median income for a household in the township was $68,958, and the median income for a family was $81,875. Males had a median income of $55,000 versus $20,375 for females. The per capita income for the township was $37,881. About 10.4% of families and 14.9% of the population were below the poverty line, including 29.6% of those under age 18 and 7.4% of those age 65 or over.

Historical population
Census	Pop.	Note	%±
2010	492		—
2020	459		−6.7%
U.S. Decennial Census
