= Illinois Route 178 =

State highway in LaSalle County, Illinois, US

Illinois Route 178
- East 8th Road
- IL 178 highlighted in red

Route information
- Maintained by IDOT
- Length: 8.49 mi (13.66 km)
- Existed: 1924–present

Major junctions
- South end: CR 14 / CR 44 in Lowell
- US 6 in North Utica
- North end: I-80 in North Utica

Location
- Country: United States
- State: Illinois
- Counties: LaSalle

Highway system
- Illinois State Highway System; Interstate; US; State; Tollways; Scenic
← IL 177	→ IL 179

Illinois Route 178 is a minor north–south state highway in north central Illinois. It runs north from the unincorporated area of Lowell to Interstate 80 about 3 miles (4.8 km) north of North Utica, which is better known as simply Utica. This is a distance of 8.49 miles (13.66 km).

== Route description ==
Illinois 178 is a short state road that connects two of Illinois' more popular state parks to Interstate 80; Starved Rock State Park and Matthiessen State Park. Starting at Interstate 80, Illinois 178 intersects U.S. Route 6 at a rural intersection, and then descends into the Illinois River valley to the town of Utica.

South of Utica, Illinois 178 crosses the Illinois River via a cantilever bridge, where it meets a western entrance into Starved Rock State Park. About one mile (1.6 km) south of Illinois Route 71 is the entrance to Matthiesen State Park. The route terminates at a rural intersection in Lowell.

== History ==
SBI Route 178 ran along the existing Illinois 178, and southwest from Lowell to what was then U.S. Route 51 in Tonica. This was dropped in the 1950s.

=== Reconstruction through Utica ===
In accordance with the village of North Utica's United Recovery Plan, which was enacted following the 2004 tornado, a re-routing of Illinois 178 west of the current business district was constructed. This project, completed in summer of 2012, eliminated two sharp bends in the former alignment and diverts local truck traffic and through traffic away from the downtown area.

The Illinois River bridge is currently under construction and is expected to be completed by late 2018. The existing cantilever bridge will be removed and replaced by a new highway bridge with decorative lighting and an added pedestrian and bicycle multi-use path.

== Major Intersections ==
The entire route is in LaSalle County.

Location	mi	km	Destinations	Notes
Lowell	0.0	0.0	CR 14 west (Ed Lambert Road) to I-39 / US 51 CR 44 south (East 8th Road)	
	4.3	6.9	IL 71	
North Utica	8.0	12.9	US 6 – LaSalle, Ottawa	
LaSalle	8.49	13.66	I-80 – Moline, Rock Island, Joliet	I-80 exit 81
1.000 mi = 1.609 km; 1.000 km = 0.621 mi
