= Leonore, Illinois =

- Village
- Location in LaSalle County, Illinois

- Location of Illinois in the United States
- Coordinates: 41°11′20″N 88°58′56″W
- Country: United States
- State: Illinois
- County: LaSalle
- Township: Richland
- Incorporated: April 20, 1891
- Certified: June 15, 1891

Government
  - Village President: Mike Zimmerman

Area
  - Total: 0.089 sq mi (0.23 km^{2})
  - Land: 0.089 sq mi (0.23 km^{2})
  - Water: 0 sq mi (0.00 km^{2})
- Elevation: 679 ft (207 m)

Population (2020)
  - Total: 121
  - Density: 1,362.2/sq mi (525.96/km^{2})
- Time zone: UTC-6 (CST)
  - Summer (DST): UTC-5 (CDT)
- ZIP code: 61332
- Area code: 815
- FIPS code: 17-42912
- GNIS feature ID: 2398423

Leonore is a village in LaSalle County, Illinois, United States. The population was 121 at the 2020 census. It is part of the Ottawa Micropolitan Statistical Area.

== History ==
Leonore was originally established as Gary in the late 1880s to serve as a station on the Illinois Valley & Northern Railroad. In 1889, the name of the station was changed as there was already a post office named Gary. Leonore was deemed the favorite of the suggested names. Leonore was incorporated as a village on April 20, 1891; this was certified on June 15, 1891.

Leonore is known locally as the site of a bank robbery.

== Geography ==
Leonore is located in southern LaSalle County 15 miles (24 km) southwest of Ottawa, the county seat, and 15 miles southeast of LaSalle.

According to the 2010 census, Leonore has a total area of 0.09 square miles (0.23 km^{2}), all land.

== Demographics ==
Historical population
Census	Pop.	Note	%±
1900	277		—
1910	203		−26.7%
1920	189		−6.9%
1930	173		−8.5%
1940	179		3.5%
1950	204		14.0%
1960	195		−4.4%
1970	196		0.5%
1980	196		0.0%
1990	134		−31.6%
2000	110		−17.9%
2010	130		18.2%
2020	121		−6.9%
U.S. Decennial Census

As of the census of 2020, there were 121 people, 64 households, and 29 families residing in the village. The population density was 1,359.6 inhabitants per square mile (524.9/km^{2}). There were 59 housing units at an average density of 662.9 per square mile (255.9/km^{2}). The racial makeup of the village was 92.6% White, 1.6% from other races, and 5.8% from two or more races. Hispanic or Latino of any race were 0.03% of the population.

There were 64 households, out of which 14.1% had children under the age of 18 living with them, 45.3% were married couples living together, and 64.8% were non-families. 54.7% of all households were made up of individuals, and 39.1% had someone living alone who was 65 years of age or older. The average household size was 2.11 and the average family size was 3.45.

In the village, the population was spread out, with 17.0% under the age of 18, 12.6% from 18 to 24, 16.5% from 25 to 44, 34.7% from 45 to 64, and 24.4% who were 65 years of age or older. The median age was 47.4 years. For every 100 females, there were 107.7 males. For every 100 females age 18 and over, there were 119.6 males.

The median income for a household in the village was $68,428, and the median income for a family was $145,288. Males had a median income of $70,625 versus $21,923 for females. The per capita income for the village was $31,701. There were no families and 11.1% of the population living below the poverty line, including no under eighteens and 39.4% of those over 65.
