= Prairie Marksman =

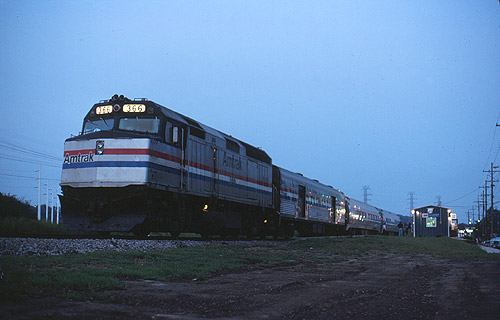
- The Prairie Marksman at East Peoria in August 1981

Overview
- Service type: Inter-city rail
- Status: Discontinued
- Locale: Illinois
- Predecessor: Peoria Rocket
- First service: August 10, 1980
- Last service: October 4, 1981
- Former operator: Amtrak

Route
- Termini: Chicago, Illinois; East Peoria, Illinois
- Stops: 1
- Distance travelled: 149 miles (240 km)
- Average journey time: 3 hours 15 minutes
- Service frequency: Daily
- Train number: 311, 312, 314

On-board services
- Class: Unreserved coach
- Catering facilities: On-board cafe

Technical
- Rolling stock: Amfleet coaches
- Track gauge: 4 ft 8 1/2 in (1,435 mm)
- Track owners: Illinois Central Gulf Railroad; Toledo, Peoria and Western Railway

The Prairie Marksman was a daily passenger train operated by Amtrak between Chicago's Union Station and East Peoria, Illinois. The route was an indirect successor to the Rock Island's Peoria Rocket.

== History ==
Prior to the creation of Amtrak Peoria was served by the Rock Island's Peoria Rocket out of the Rock Island's Rock Island Depot. Then in serious financial distress, the Rock Island opted out of Amtrak in 1971. The company decided it was cheaper to keep running its remaining passenger trains, the Peoria Rocket and Quad Cities Rocket, than hand them to Amtrak. The two trains continued running until December 31, 1978, each providing one daily round trip between Chicago's LaSalle Street Station and Peoria and Rock Island, respectively, via Joliet. With the demise of the Rock Island, Peoria's nearest railroad connection was at Chillicothe, Illinois, 20 miles (32 km) to the north, where Amtrak's Lone Star (Chicago-Kansas City-Houston) and Southwest Limited (Chicago-Kansas City-Los Angeles) – successors to the Santa Fe's Texas Chief and Super Chief, respectively – stopped daily. The Lone Star, however, fell victim to budget cuts and was discontinued in October 1979.

The Prairie Marksman began on August 10, 1980, as a joint venture between Amtrak and the state of Illinois. Eschewing the Rock Island route, the Prairie Marksman used the old GM&O line between Chicago and Chenoa, Illinois, and then traveled west over the Toledo, Peoria & Western to East Peoria. The name was derived from a TP&W freight train which once operated over that route between Webster, Illinois and Keokuk, Iowa.

The Prairie Marksman was intended as a one-year pilot project. However, the train only attracted 65 passengers per day, not even half of the 150 per day needed to justify making it permanent. Amtrak added service to Eureka, Illinois on July 25, 1981. Amid losses of $120,000, Illinois withdrew its support for the train, and the Prairie Marksman made its last run on October 4, 1981.

With the end of the Prairie Marksman, the Peoria area's only intercity link was the Southwest Limited – later renamed the Southwest Chief – in Chillicothe. However, Amtrak rerouted the Chief away from Chillicothe in 1996. Since then, the nearest Amtrak station is at Normal's Uptown Station, 40 miles (64 km) to the southeast, which is served by the Lincoln Service and Texas Eagle. Amtrak operates Amtrak Thruway service between Peoria and Normal.

== Proposed revival in September 2011 ==
The Illinois Department of Transportation formally requested Amtrak to conduct a study to analyze the feasibility of initiating inter-city passenger train service between Chicago and Peoria. A number of possible alternate routes were identified and reviewed at a high level, and these results are summarized and discussed in a document published by Amtrak in September 2011.

With the successful application by the State of Illinois for federal stimulus funding to upgrade the Chicago-St. Louis Corridor to a maximum speed of 110 miles per hour (180 km/h), the study request was modified to one route that would provide the Peoria area with connectivity to certain Amtrak corridor trains. After an initial review of the various routes, it became apparent that instead of a complete route feasibility study between Chicago and Peoria, either a rail or bus shuttle between the Peoria area and Normal, Illinois, utilizing the recently constructed multi-modal transportation station in the Uptown Normal neighborhood, would be the most expedient way to meet the goal of the IDOT.

A decision was made by IDOT that no through-train frequencies between Peoria and Chicago were to be considered. In lieu of Chicago-Peoria through train service, IDOT directed Amtrak to explore a shuttle feeder system that would provide guaranteed corridor train connections at Normal with the Lincoln Service and thus permit morning and evening departures from Peoria and Chicago. The shuttle would use the Norfolk Southern Railway to reach Normal. Amtrak estimated start-up costs at $106 million, mostly for a new connecting track in Normal which would permit the trains to bypass a Union Pacific Railroad yard there.
