= Rutland, Illinois =

- Village
- Location in LaSalle County, Illinois
- Coordinates: 40°59′02″N 89°02′29″W
- Country: United States
- State: Illinois
- County: LaSalle
- Township: Groveland

Area
  - Total: 0.69 sq mi (1.80 km^{2})
  - Land: 0.69 sq mi (1.80 km^{2})
  - Water: 0 sq mi (0.00 km^{2})
- Elevation: 702 ft (214 m)

Population (2020)
  - Total: 259
  - Density: 373.0/sq mi (144.03/km^{2})
- Time zone: UTC-6 (CST)
  - Summer (DST): UTC-5 (CDT)
- ZIP code: 61358
- Area code: 815
- FIPS code: 17-66443
- GNIS feature ID: 2399151

Rutland is a village in LaSalle County, Illinois, United States. It is part of the Ottawa Micropolitan Statistical Area. As of the 2020 census, the population was 259, down from 318 at the 2010 census.

The village was named after Rutland, Vermont.

== History ==
The village was founded as “New Rutland” in 1855 when approximately 200 members of the Vermont Emigration Association paid $10 each for a plot of land. The original location of the town-site was exclusively within LaSalle county. However, an additional ten blocks of land were added October 20, 1856, located primarily in adjacent Marshall County.

=== 2021 Village Hall Fire ===
On the morning of October 15, 2021, a fire was reported across the street from the village's 100 block of Northwest Front Street. Fifteen fire departments responded, including Streator, along with multiple ambulances and law enforcement personal. The fire is currently being investaged as an arson attack.

== Geography ==
Rutland is located in the southern panhandle of LaSalle County. The western border of the village is the LaSalle/Marshall County line. Approximately five blocks of developed land extend west into Marshall County, outside the village limits.

Illinois Route 251 follows the county line and the western border of the village. It leads north 5 miles (8 km) to Wenona and south 7 miles (11 km) to Minonk in Woodford County. Interstate 39 passes 0.5 miles (0.80 km) of the village limits, but there is no direct access to Rutland. The nearest exits are 3 miles (5 km) to the north and 5 miles (8 km) to the south.

According to the 2021 census gazetteer files, Rutland has a total area of 0.69 square miles (1.79 km^{2}), all land.

== Demographics ==
Historical population
Census	Pop.	Note	%±
1870	412		—
1880	402		−2.4%
1890	509		26.6%
1900	894		75.6%
1910	754		−15.7%
1920	618		−18.0%
1930	495		−19.9%
1940	462		−6.7%
1950	486		5.2%
1960	509		4.7%
1970	437		−14.1%
1980	487		11.4%
1990	391		−19.7%
2000	354		−9.5%
2010	318		−10.2%
2020	259		−18.6%
U.S. Decennial Census

As of the 2020 census there were 259 people, 124 households, and 79 families residing in the village. The population density was 373.20 inhabitants per square mile (144.09/km^{2}). There were 132 housing units at an average density of 190.20 per square mile (73.44/km^{2}). The racial makeup of the village was 89.58% White, 3.09% African American, 1.54% from other races, and 5.79% from two or more races. Hispanic or Latino of any race were 6.18% of the population.

There were 124 households, out of which 24.2% had children under the age of 18 living with them, 45.97% were married couples living together, 9.68% had a female householder with no husband present, and 36.29% were non-families. 36.29% of all households were made up of individuals, and 25.00% had someone living alone who was 65 years of age or older. The average household size was 2.96 and the average family size was 2.25.

The village's age distribution consisted of 30.1% under the age of 18, 3.6% from 18 to 24, 20.1% from 25 to 44, 23.6% from 45 to 64, and 22.6% who were 65 years of age or older. The median age was 38.9 years. For every 100 females, there were 84.8 males. For every 100 females age 18 and over, there were 85.7 males.

The median income for a household in the village was $43,750, and the median income for a family was $56,719. Males had a median income of $50,625 versus $9,938 for females. The per capita income for the village was $22,763. About 15.2% of families and 25.1% of the population were below the poverty line, including 41.7% of those under age 18 and 1.6% of those age 65 or over.
