= Lake of the Woods, Peoria County, Illinois =

Lake of the Woods Estates Lake of the Woods Estates Lake of the Woods Estates
- Unincorporated community
- Lake of the Woods Estates, Illinois
- Location within Illinois Location within the United States
- Coordinates: 40°50′24″N 89°36′18″W
- Country: United States
- State: Illinois
- Time zone: UTC-6 (Central (CST))
  - Summer (DST): UTC-5 (CDT)
- Area code: 309

Lake of the Woods Estates is a subdivision of approximately 400 in Peoria County, Illinois. The center of the neighborhood is a man-made lake covering approximately 40 acres (160,000 m^{2}). The neighborhood is governed by a homeowners association.

Created by real estate developer Harold Jenn in the 1960s, Lake of the Woods Estates was at the beginning of a decades-long population shift towards the north in Peoria, a trend that continues today.

The dividing line between Dunlap Community Unit School District 323 and Illinois Valley Central Unit District 321 runs through the subdivision. The subdivision lies within Medina Township, which supplies most of the governmental services.

== See also ==
- Peoria metropolitan area
