= Budd, Illinois =

- Unincorporated community
- Location within Illinois Location within the United States
- Coordinates: 41°05′56″N 88°37′23″W
- Country: United States
- State: Illinois
- County: Livingston
- Township: Sunbury
- Elevation: 705 ft (215 m)
- Time zone: UTC-6 (Central (CST))
  - Summer (DST): UTC-5 (CDT)
- ZIP code: 61313
- Area codes: 815 & 779
- GNIS feature ID: 422513

Budd is an unincorporated community in section 2 of Sunbury Township, Livingston County, Illinois, United States. Budd is 13 miles (21 km) southeast of Streator and 11 miles (18 km) west of Dwight, Illinois. Budd has ZIP code 61313.

== History ==
Budd is situated on the Norfolk Southern Railroad, (originally New York Central), nearly midway between the cities of Streator and Dwight. In 1909, William Cahill was in charge of the town's grain elevator and John Hughes ran a general store. There was also a post office which is no longer open.
