= Mendota Township, LaSalle County, Illinois =

Coordinates: 41°35′00″N 89°06′34″W

Mendota Township
- Township
- Location in LaSalle County

- LaSalle County's location in Illinois
- Country: United States
- State: Illinois
- County: LaSalle
- Established: February 1856

Area
  - Total: 36.04 sq mi (93.3 km^{2})
  - Land: 35.93 sq mi (93.1 km^{2})
  - Water: 0.11 sq mi (0.28 km^{2}) 0.30%

Population (2020)
  - Total: 7,207
  - Density: 200.6/sq mi (77.45/km^{2})
- Time zone: UTC-6 (CST)
  - Summer (DST): UTC-5 (CDT)
- FIPS code: 17-099-48346

Mendota Township is located in LaSalle County, Illinois, United States. As of the 2020 census, its population was 7,207 and it contained 3,154 housing units. Mendota Township was formed from Meriden Township in February, 1856.

== Geography ==
According to the 2021 census gazetteer files, Mendota Township has a total area of 36.04 square miles (93.34 km^{2}), of which 35.93 square miles (93.06 km^{2}) (or 99.70%) is land and 0.11 square miles (0.28 km^{2}) (or 0.30%) is water.

== Demographics ==
As of the 2020 census there were 7,207 people, 2,925 households, and 2,036 families residing in the township. The population density was 199.97 inhabitants per square mile (77.21/km^{2}). There were 3,154 housing units at an average density of 87.51 per square mile (33.79/km^{2}). The racial makeup of the township was 75.11% White, 0.99% African American, 0.96% Native American, 0.92% Asian, 0.06% Pacific Islander, 11.41% from other races, and 10.57% from two or more races. Hispanic or Latino of any race were 27.51% of the population.

There were 2,925 households, out of which 33.10% had children under the age of 18 living with them, 50.53% were married couples living together, 12.99% had a female householder with no spouse present, and 30.39% were non-families. 26.70% of all households were made up of individuals, and 12.30% had someone living alone who was 65 years of age or older. The average household size was 2.39 and the average family size was 2.86.

The township's age distribution consisted of 22.3% under the age of 18, 10.0% from 18 to 24, 21.9% from 25 to 44, 27.6% from 45 to 64, and 18.2% who were 65 years of age or older. The median age was 40.7 years. For every 100 females, there were 103.2 males. For every 100 females age 18 and over, there were 99.8 males.

The median income for a household in the township was $60,874, and the median income for a family was $67,055. Males had a median income of $44,379 versus $29,250 for females. The per capita income for the township was $32,091. About 5.0% of families and 9.7% of the population were below the poverty line, including 12.0% of those under age 18 and 4.9% of those age 65 or over.

Historical population
Census	Pop.	Note	%±
2010	7,534		—
2020	7,207		−4.3%
U.S. Decennial Census
