= Osage Township, LaSalle County, Illinois =

Coordinates: 41°03′26″N 88°59′50″W

Osage Township
- Township
- Location in LaSalle County

- LaSalle County's location in Illinois
- Country: United States
- State: Illinois
- County: LaSalle
- Established: Before September, 1856

Area
  - Total: 38.29 sq mi (99.2 km^{2})
  - Land: 38.29 sq mi (99.2 km^{2})
  - Water: 0 sq mi (0 km^{2}) 0%

Population (2020)
  - Total: 235
  - Density: 6.14/sq mi (2.37/km^{2})
- Time zone: UTC-6 (CST)
  - Summer (DST): UTC-5 (CDT)
- FIPS code: 17-099-56731

Osage Township is located in LaSalle County, Illinois. As of the 2020 census, its population was 235 and it contained 113 housing units. Osage Township was formed from Eagle Township sometime prior to September, 1856.

== Geography ==
According to the 2021 census gazetteer files, Osage Township has a total area of 38.29 square miles (99.17 km^{2}), all land.

== Demographics ==
As of the 2020 census there were 235 people, 133 households, and 115 families residing in the township. The population density was 6.14 inhabitants per square mile (2.37/km^{2}). There were 113 housing units at an average density of 2.95 per square mile (1.14/km^{2}). The racial makeup of the township was 88.09% White, 0.00% African American, 0.00% Native American, 0.00% Asian, 0.00% Pacific Islander, 4.68% from other races, and 7.23% from two or more races. Hispanic or Latino of any race were 8.09% of the population.

There were 133 households, out of which 30.10% had children under the age of 18 living with them, 81.95% were married couples living together, 4.51% had a female householder with no spouse present, and 13.53% were non-families. 8.30% of all households were made up of individuals, and 0.00% had someone living alone who was 65 years of age or older. The average household size was 2.65 and the average family size was 2.78.

The township's age distribution consisted of 16.4% under the age of 18, 4.0% from 18 to 24, 22.3% from 25 to 44, 36% from 45 to 64, and 21.2% who were 65 years of age or older. The median age was 46.8 years. For every 100 females, there were 72.2 males. For every 100 females age 18 and over, there were 77.7 males.

The median income for a household in the township was $101,311, and the median income for a family was $101,860. Males had a median income of $58,750 versus $42,292 for females. The per capita income for the township was $37,808. No families and 1.7% of the population were below the poverty line, including none of those under age 18 and none of those age 65 or over.

Historical population
Census	Pop.	Note	%±
2010	279		—
2020	235		−15.8%
U.S. Decennial Census
