= Illinois Valley Central Unit District 321 =

School district in Illinois, United States

Coordinates: 40.913°N 89.503°W

Illinois Valley Central Unit District 321 is the school district in the northeast corner of Peoria County, Illinois, including the communities of Chillicothe, Mossville, and Rome, Illinois.

== Schools ==
- Illinois Valley Central High School, Chillicothe: usually referred to as "IVC" or occasionally still as "Chillicothe"
- Chillicothe Elementary Center (CEC), Chillicothe: approximately 495 students
- Mossville School, Mossville: approximately 800 students
- South Elementary School, Chillicothe: approximately 285 students

== History ==
Illinois Valley Central District Unit 321 was formed in 1968, with Dr. A. Lee Aeschliman appointed as its first superintendent.
