= Illinois Route 18 =

State highway in central Illinois, US

Illinois Route 18
- North 13th Road
- IL 18 highlighted in red

Route information
- Maintained by IDOT
- Length: 39.01 mi (62.78 km)
- Existed: 1939–present

Major junctions
- West end: IL 29 in Henry
- I-39 / US 51 in Lostant
- East end: IL 17 in Blackstone

Location
- Country: United States
- State: Illinois
- Counties: Stark, Marshall, Putnam, LaSalle, Livingston

Highway system
- Illinois State Highway System; Interstate; US; State; Tollways; Scenic
← IL 17	→ IL 19

Illinois Route 18 (IL 18) is a rural east–west state route in central Illinois. It runs east from the town of Henry at Illinois Route 29 to the town of Blackstone at Illinois Route 17. This is a distance of 39.01 miles (62.78 km).

== Route description ==
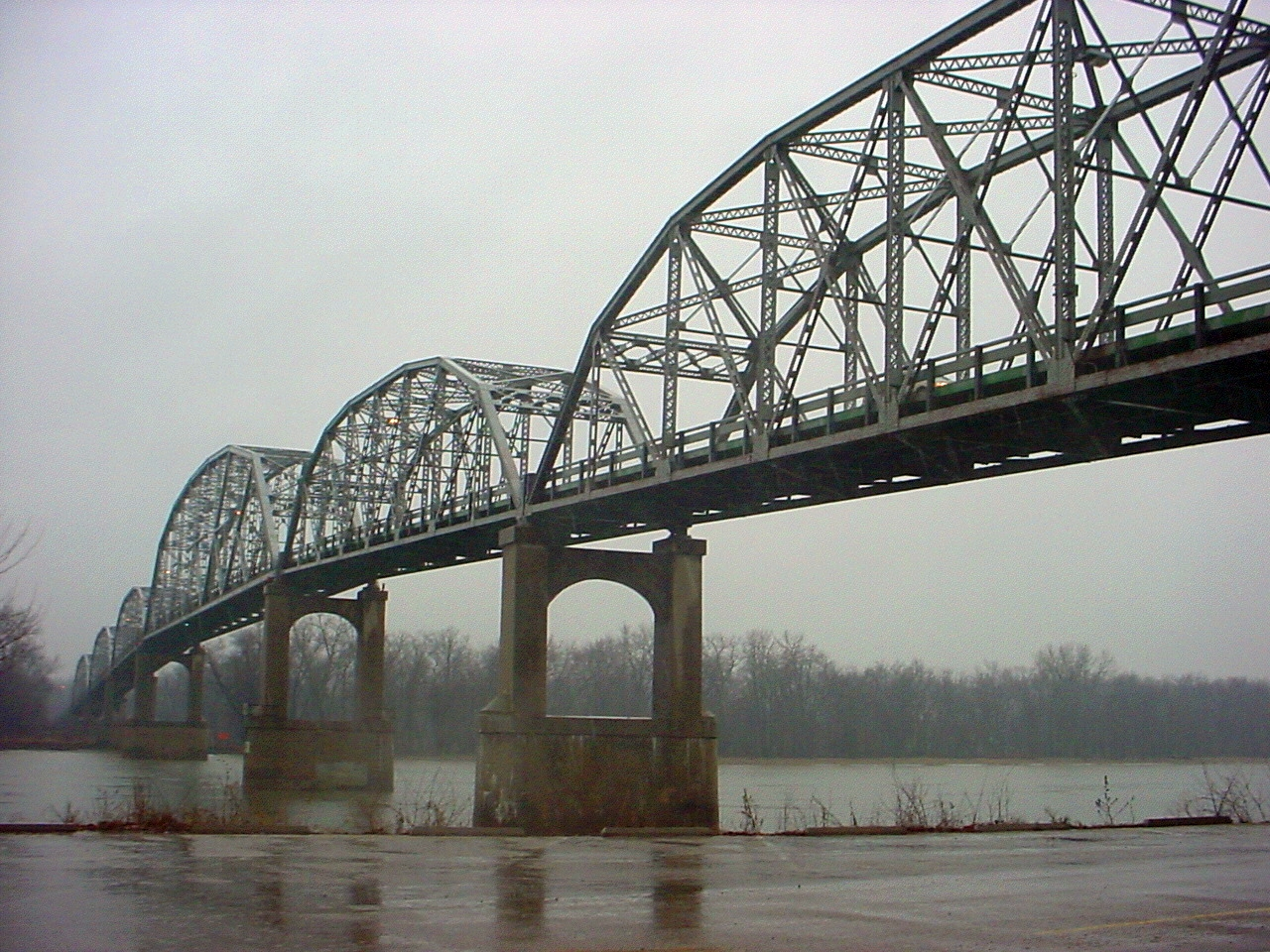
IL 18 crosses over the Illinois River at Henry, Illinois

Illinois 18 crosses the Illinois River at Henry, and is the first river crossing south of Interstate 180. The terrain is generally flat outside of the Illinois River Valley area. In Streator, Illinois 18 westbound becomes Main Street. Eastbound, it becomes Bridge Street. Illinois 18 is also known as North 13th Road and East 24th Road in LaSalle County.

== History ==
From 1918 through 1935, SBI Route 18 ran from Chicago to Princeton using what used to be part of U.S. Route 32. Since then, IL 18 as well as part of US 32 were superseded by US 34. In 1939, it was applied to what was then SBI Routes 89B and 89C as well as part of SBI Route 17. The next year, the route was completed and Illinois 17 moved to a new highway south of Streator.

== Major intersections ==
County	Location	mi	km	Destinations	Notes
Stark	Henry	0.0	0.0	IL 29 (University Street)	
Illinois River		1.2	1.9	Henry Bridge	
Marshall	Sparland	2.1	3.4	IL 26 south	West end of IL 26 overlap
Putnam	Lacon	2.8	4.5	IL 26 north	East end of IL 26 overlap
Putnam	Magnolia	9.9	15.9	IL 89	
LaSalle		16.5	26.6	I-39 / US 51 – Bloomington-Normal, Rockford	I-39 exit 41
LaSalle	Wenona	17.0	27.4	IL 251	
LaSalle	Streator	29.1	46.8	IL 23 (Bloomington Street, Park Street)	
Livingston	Blackstone	39.01	62.78	IL 17 to I-55	
1.000 mi = 1.609 km; 1.000 km = 0.621 mi: Concurrency terminus
