= Lowell, Illinois =

- Unincorporated community
- Location within Illinois Location within the United States
- Coordinates: 41°15′02″N 89°00′38″W
- Country: United States
- State: Illinois
- County: LaSalle
- Township: Vermillion
- Elevation: 623 ft (190 m)
- Time zone: UTC-6 (Central (CST))
  - Summer (DST): UTC-5 (CDT)
- Area codes: 815 & 779
- GNIS feature ID: 412706

Lowell is an unincorporated community in LaSalle County, Illinois, United States. Lowell is located on Illinois Route 178, 4 miles (6.4 km) southeast of Oglesby. The town was laid out around 1830 by William Seeley. It once thrived due its location on the Peoria-Chicago Stagecoach Route, the waterpower of the Vermilion River and the coal outcroppings along the river bluffs. It developed several stores and taverns, a mill and a brick factory and a railroad spur that connected to the Burlington Railroad. Its most famous resident was Benjamin Lundy, a fiery Quaker abolitionist who came to Illinois to be the successor of Elijah Lovejoy, recently murdered for his anti-slavery beliefs. Lundy published the paper, Genius of Universal Emancipation from Lowell. The town declined and today offers river rafting.
