= Blackstone, Illinois =

- Unincorporated community
- Location within Illinois Location within the United States
- Coordinates: 41°05′04″N 88°41′27″W
- Country: United States
- State: Illinois
- County: Livingston
- Township: Sunbury
- Elevation: 735 ft (224 m)
- Time zone: UTC-6 (Central (CST))
  - Summer (DST): UTC-5 (CDT)
- ZIP code: 61313
- Area codes: 815 & 779
- GNIS feature ID: 404529

Blackstone is an unincorporated community in section 7 of Sunbury Township, Livingston County, Illinois, United States. Blackstone is 10 miles (16 km) southeast of Streator and 13 miles (21 km) west of Dwight, Illinois. Blackstone has a post office with ZIP code 61313.

== History ==
The town was named after 19th-century railroad executive Timothy Blackstone, then president of the Alton Railroad. A post office was established in 1870.

Blackstone was situated on the western extension of the Chicago & Alton Railroad, nearly midway between the cities of Streator and Dwight. The land where the town was located originally belonged to R. B. Hamilton. About the time that the line of the railroad was completed, the land was purchased by William Shepard of Jersey County, Illinois. He commissioned A. C. Huetson to lay out the town which he completed on January 6, 1870. The original plat consisted of eighty acres.

The first house within the limits of the town had been built by R. B. Hamilton prior to the arrival of the town and the railroad. Shortly after the survey was completed, Frank McIntosh built a general merchandise store and R. B. Hamilton erected a warehouse for storing grain. By 1878, the warehouse was idle, the business having been absorbed by the Kent Brothers who had built a grain elevator.

Once Blackstone was established, the post office of Sunbury Township was moved to the town. Charles A. Holton was Blackstone's first Postmaster. Early settlers in Blackstone included J. L. Colier, Enoch Sherick, R. D. Gregg, J. T. Trainor and J. A. Fout. Colier was a blacksmith. Fout was a carpenter who built many of the early houses in Blackstone.

In the early years of Blackstone, there were no organized churches. Sunday services of several denominations were held by turns in the two room schoolhouse on the north side of the village. The United Methodist Church in Blackstone was built in 1879 at the cost of $5,000.00. St. Bernard Catholic Church was located four miles east of Blackstone and began service in 1880. The first church was a frame wood building. The brick church was later built in 1895 at a cost of $7,000.00.
