= Alta, Illinois =

- Unincorporated community
- Location within Peoria County, Illinois
- Coordinates: 40°48′39″N 89°38′03″W
- Country: United States
- State: Illinois
- County: Peoria
- Elevation: 751 ft (229 m)
- Time zone: UTC-6 (Central (CST))
  - Summer (DST): UTC-5 (CDT)
- Area code: 309
- GNIS feature ID: 403461

Alta is an unincorporated community on the northwest border of Peoria in Peoria County, Illinois, United States. Alta is 8 miles (13 km) north-northwest of downtown Peoria. The decommissioned Illinois State Route 174 runs through Alta, and the Rock Island Trail begins in Alta.

== History ==
Alta was laid out in 1873 when the railroad was extended to that point. The community was so named on account of its lofty elevation. A post office was established at Alta in 1873, and remained in operation until the 1970s.
