= Groveland Township, LaSalle County, Illinois =

Coordinates: 40°58′09″N 88°59′14″W

Groveland Township
- Township
- Location in LaSalle County

- LaSalle County's location in Illinois
- Country: United States
- State: Illinois
- County: LaSalle
- Established: Before September, 1856

Area
  - Total: 36.78 sq mi (95.3 km^{2})
  - Land: 36.78 sq mi (95.3 km^{2})
  - Water: 0 sq mi (0 km^{2}) 0%

Population (2020)
  - Total: 569
  - Density: 15.5/sq mi (5.97/km^{2})
- Time zone: UTC-6 (CST)
  - Summer (DST): UTC-5 (CDT)
- FIPS code: 17-099-31914

Groveland Township is located in LaSalle County, Illinois. It is at the very southern end of LaSalle County. As of the 2020 census, its population was 569 and it contained 266 housing units. Groveland Township was formed from Eagle Township sometime prior to September, 1856.

== Geography ==
According to the 2021 census gazetteer files, Groveland Township has a total area of 36.78 square miles (95.26 km^{2}), all land.

== Demographics ==
As of the 2020 census there were 569 people, 197 households, and 118 families residing in the township. The population density was 15.47 inhabitants per square mile (5.97/km^{2}). There were 266 housing units at an average density of 7.23 per square mile (2.79/km^{2}). The racial makeup of the township was 91.56% White, 1.41% African American, 0.00% Native American, 0.00% Asian, 0.00% Pacific Islander, 1.58% from other races, and 5.45% from two or more races. Hispanic or Latino of any race were 3.69% of the population.

There were 197 households, out of which 23.40% had children under the age of 18 living with them, 45.18% were married couples living together, 8.63% had a female householder with no spouse present, and 40.10% were non-families. 38.60% of all households were made up of individuals, and 22.80% had someone living alone who was 65 years of age or older. The average household size was 2.19 and the average family size was 2.95.

The township's age distribution consisted of 25.5% under the age of 18, 5.1% from 18 to 24, 19.2% from 25 to 44, 31.2% from 45 to 64, and 19.0% who were 65 years of age or older. The median age was 46.1 years. For every 100 females, there were 88.6 males. For every 100 females age 18 and over, there were 89.4 males.

The median income for a household in the township was $42,266, and the median income for a family was $63,750. Males had a median income of $43,500 versus $15,500 for females. The per capita income for the township was $29,288. About 11.9% of families and 17.9% of the population were below the poverty line, including 34.3% of those under age 18 and 1.2% of those age 65 or over.

Historical population
Census	Pop.	Note	%±
2010	628		—
2020	569		−9.4%
U.S. Decennial Census
