= William Taylor Davidson =

American journalist (1837–1915)

William T. Davidson
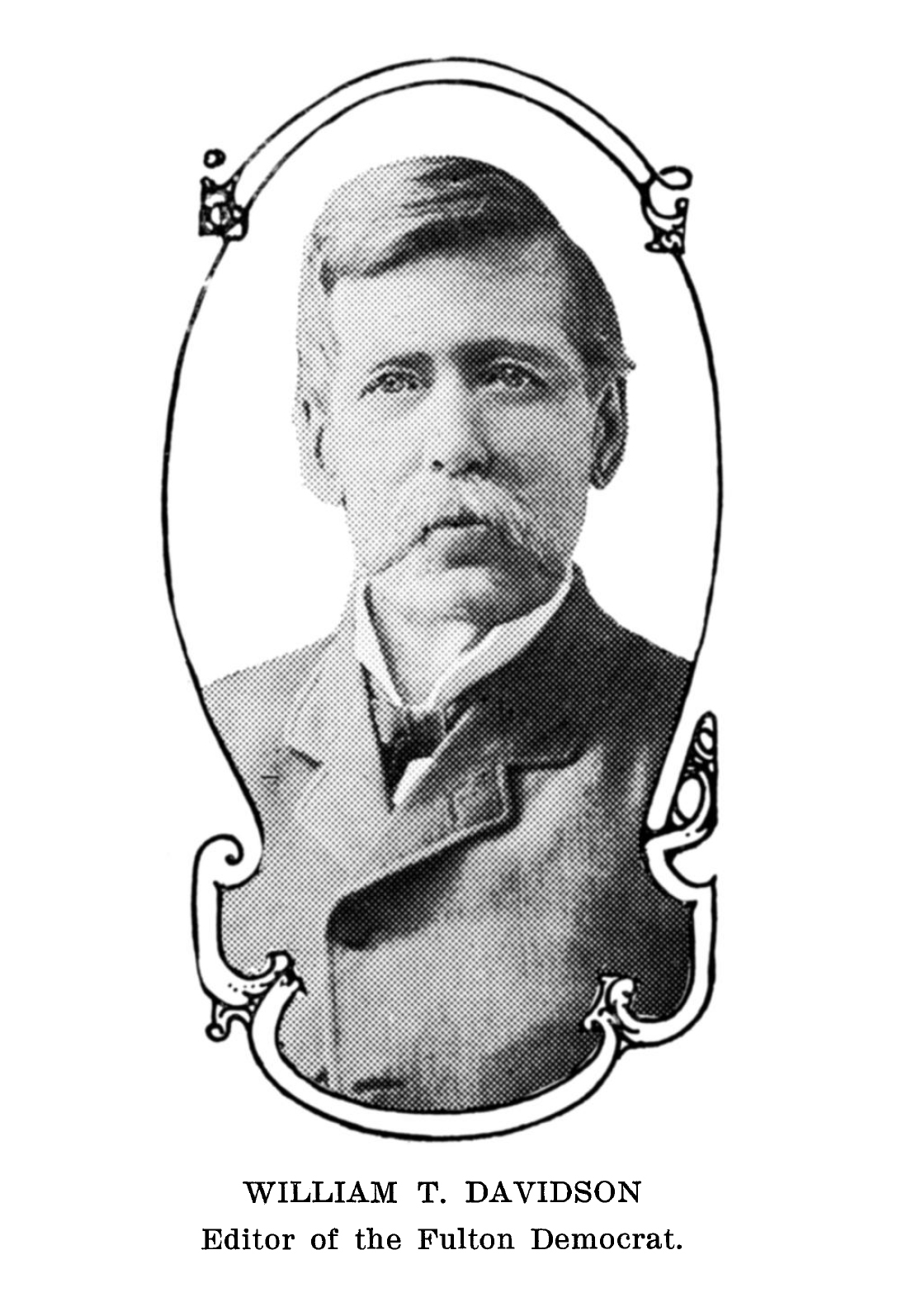
- Born: February 8, 1837
- Died: January 3, 1915 (aged 77)
- Resting place: Oak Hill Cemetery; Lewistown, Illinois
- Occupation: Newspaper editor
- Notable work: The Yellow Rose: A Wilderness Honeymoon
- Spouse(s): Lucinda M. "Lue" Miner (m. 1860; her death 1893); Margaret Gilman George (m. 1895; her death 1897)
- Children: 8

Signature
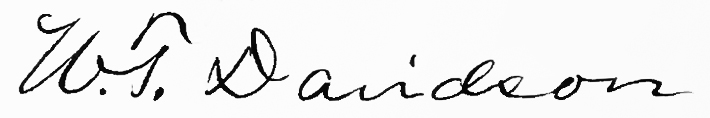

William Taylor Davidson (February 8, 1837 – January 3, 1915) was the owner and editor of the Fulton Democrat newspaper from 1858 to 1915. He was a staunch supporter of Stephen A. Douglas and a strong advocate for the views of the Peace Democrats or Copperheads during the American Civil War.

== Early life and education ==
William T. Davidson was born on February 8, 1837, in Petersburg, Illinois, to Isham Gillham Davidson and Sarah Ann Springer. In the fall of 1838, the family moved from Petersburg to Lewistown, Illinois, where William acquired a limited education in the district school. He began his schooling at age 4 and typically attended 2–3 months per year, sometimes missing entire years. William left school at the age of 12 in order to earn a living, working with his father as a transporter of produce, merchandise, and building materials. However, a weak arm and general physical frailty led him to give up this strenuous occupation, and he became an apprentice and compositor for local newspapers, including the Fulton Republican, Peoria Daily Herald, and Peoria Transcript.

== Marriage and children ==
William Davidson married Lucinda M. Miner in Fulton County, Illinois on January 24, 1860. The couple had seven children: Harold L., Bertha B., Frances M., Lulu M., Maude G., Mabel, and Nellie (the latter two died in infancy). Lucinda Davidson died of a heart condition on December 25, 1893.

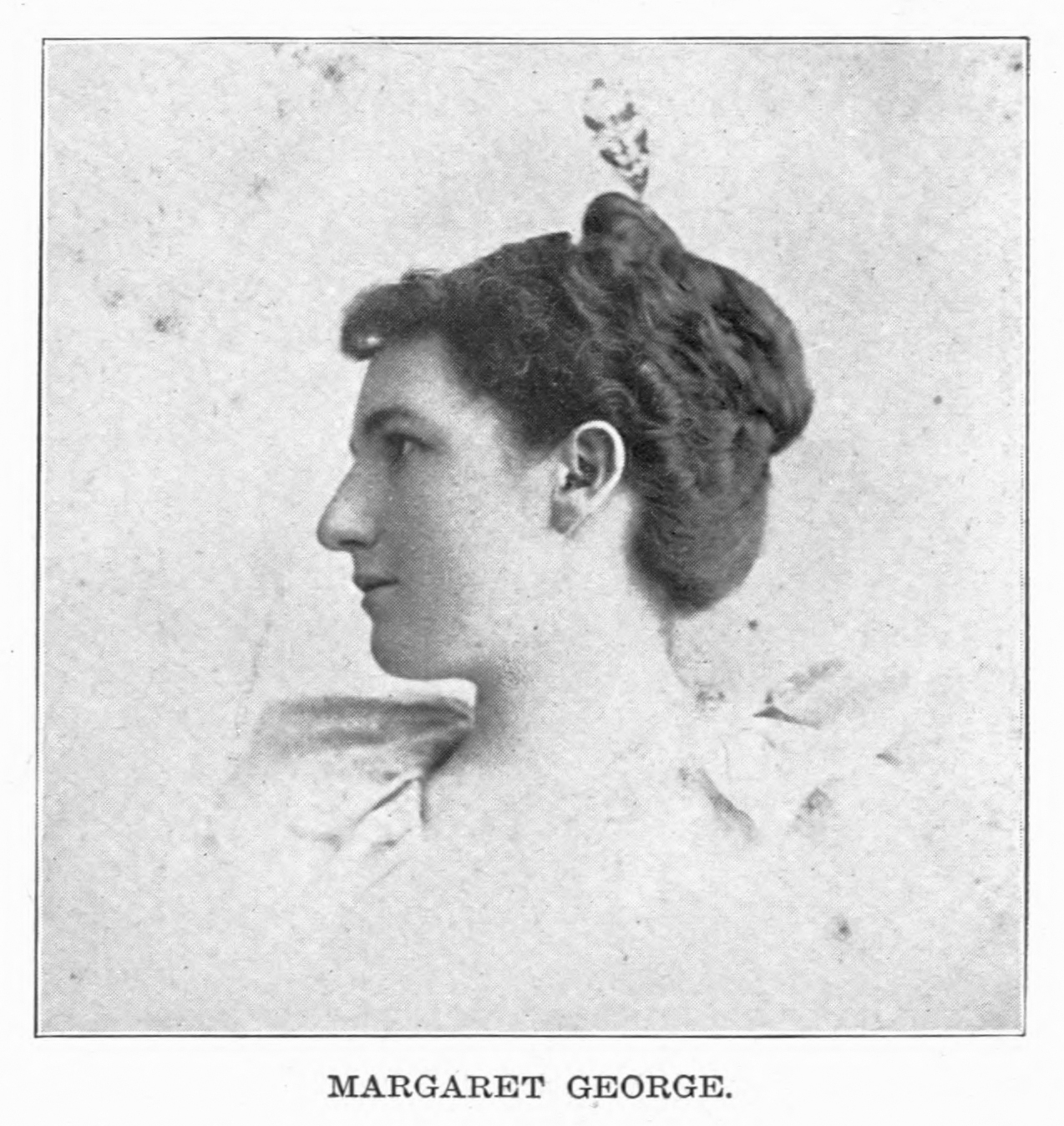
Margaret Gilman George, poet, early sweetheart of Edgar Lee Masters, second wife of William T. Davidson, and co-author (with Davidson) of The Yellow Rose: A Wilderness Honeymoon.

On April 3, 1895, William married his second wife, poet Margaret Gilman George (who was 32 years younger than her husband), in Dallas, Texas. The couple had one son, William Gilman Davidson, who later became publisher and editor of the Fulton Democrat. Margaret Davidson died suddenly on November 27, 1897, due to a heart condition stemming from a childhood illness. (Note: Although Margaret Davidson's grave marker gives her death year as 1896, numerous sources indicate that it was 1897.)

== Professional life ==
In 1856, at the age of 19, Davidson became involved with the operation of the Fulton Democrat, which had been established by his older brother, James M. Davidson. On November 12, 1858, William Davidson assumed ownership and editorship of the newspaper, taking over after James Davidson's retirement. William Davidson remained in that position until his death, with the exception of a brief period in the mid-1890s. In 1894, he sold the newspaper and moved to Texas (where he married Margaret George). He then returned to Lewistown in 1895, rebought the Fulton Democrat, and resumed its editorship.

Davidson never sought or held a major political office. However, he was the Fulton County superintendent of schools from 1863 to 1865 and a Lewistown city alderman for one year. He was also involved in numerous civic activities in Lewistown and Fulton County. He was instrumental in establishing a narrow gauge railroad that connected Lewistown with the towns of northern Fulton County. Together with prominent local merchants, Davidson organized the Lewistown Building and Loan Association. Davidson played a prominent role in the movement to keep Lewistown as the county seat, and he spearheaded the rebuilding of the Fulton County court house in Lewistown after a fire of uncertain origin demolished the building on December 14, 1894. Davidson also supported the establishment of a number of local industries, including a woolen mill, an iron foundry, and a canning factory.

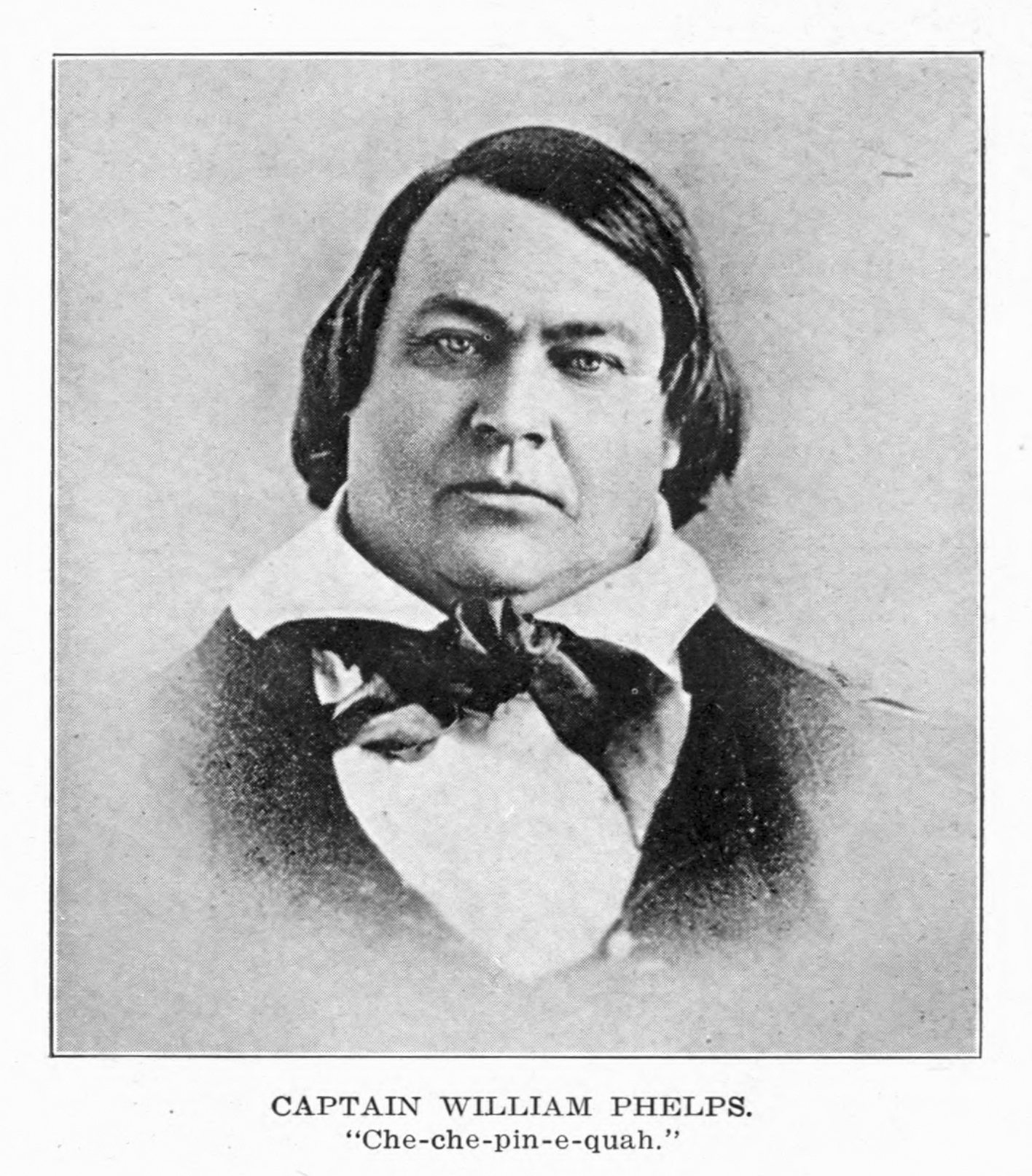
Captain William Phelps, husband of Caroline Kelsey Phelps. The couple were the basis for the main characters of Davidson's novel The Yellow Rose. William Phelps is also presumed to be the basis for the character of Old Bill Piersol mentioned in "Hod Putt" in Edgar Lee Masters' Spoon River Anthology. "Che-che-pin-e-quah," the name given to William Phelps by Native Americans, referred to his powerful upper body.

An avid chronicler of life in Illinois during the 1800s, Davidson wrote The Hermit, a novel that was published serially in the Fulton Democrat (although never in book form). The novel was based on the life of a legendary and enigmatic early settler in the Spoon River region named Dr. Davison, a "man of considerable culture" but "a recluse and misanthrope whose one desire was to be alone." Davidson also wrote the novel The Yellow Rose: A Wilderness Honeymoon in collaboration with Margaret George. The novel was first published as a series of chapters in the Fulton Democrat and appeared later in book form. The Yellow Rose is a fictionalized account of the first year of the marriage of William Phelps, an Illinois fur trader and merchant, and his wife, Caroline Kelsey, niece of Ossian M. Ross, the founder of Lewistown, Illinois. William Phelps and Caroline Kelsey were married on March 2, 1830, and the narrative provides a glimpse of pioneer life in Illinois and neighboring states during the early to mid-1800s. The published book also includes a transcription of Caroline Kelsey's diary.

In the 1890s, Davidson encouraged Harvey Lee Ross, a son of Ossian M. Ross, to write a series of articles describing life as an Illinois pioneer. The articles were published originally in the Fulton Democrat and then subsequently in book form. The published book includes the author's personal recollections of Abraham Lincoln, Andrew Jackson, and Reverend Peter Cartwright as well as Ross' autobiography and is of considerable interest to Lincoln collectors and historians.

In an address to the Illinois State Historical Society, published in the society's transactions in 1908, Davidson reminisced about men he had known in the Illinois Military Tract. These included Stephen A. Douglas, Abraham Lincoln, Edward Dickinson Baker, James Shields, Peter Cartwright, William Kellogg, Lewis Winans Ross, Leonard Fulton Ross, William C. Goudy, William Pitt Kellogg, Chauncey L. Higbee, and Robert G. Ingersoll. Davidson had first met many of these individuals, including Lincoln, Douglas, and Cartwright, during his childhood, when they were frequent guests of his parents.

== Political views ==
An independent thinker politically, Davidson generally supported the tenets of the Democratic party. Many of Davidson's political views were expressed in a series of columns published in the Fulton Democrat, in which Davidson assumed the persona of Uncle Zeb, a "rheumatic, choleric, gouty old bachelor." During the election of 1860, Davidson was a strong advocate for the candidacy of his long-time friend Stephen A. Douglas, arguing that Abraham Lincoln, whom Davidson had also known for years, was unfit to be president. During the Civil War, Davidson espoused the anti-war Peace Democrat or Copperhead point of view in his newspaper editorials, arguing, for example, that military officers desired to prolong the war because they were earning high salaries.

Davidson later changed his opinion of Lincoln, conceding that Lincoln was "the greatest man in American history" and that he had been "especially raised up for the work he performed while president." Nevertheless, Davidson continued to believe that Douglas' contributions to history were being neglected. In a speech presented in Freeport, Illinois, on August 27, 1908 (the 50th anniversary of the Lincoln-Douglas debate), Davidson argued that Douglas had dedicated his service to the Union cause, even though Douglas' views were in disagreement with those of Lincoln. This speech was repeated on a number of occasions, including an address to the state house in Springfield, Illinois, on April 23, 1913 (the one hundredth anniversary of Douglas' death). William Davidson was also a great admirer of Theodore Roosevelt, and he was a strong supporter of Woodrow Wilson, whom he considered to be the greatest American president since Abraham Lincoln.

William Davidson became an active temperance advocate following his last drink of intoxicating liquor on December 31, 1865. Prior to that date (and especially during the years of the Civil War), Davidson had fallen into "habits of excessive dissipation characteristic of the times." During the early 1880s, Davidson turned his political support to the Prohibition party after he became disenchanted with the Democratic party, and for a brief period in 1884, the motto of the Fulton Democrat became "The Home against the Saloon." However, Davidson returned to the Democratic party after the election of Grover Cleveland as president in 1884. The Fulton Democrat resumed its position as an "Independent Democratic Newspaper," although Davidson continued his active support for the temperance movement.

== Davidson and Edgar Lee Masters ==
Davidson's prohibitionist activities aroused the ire of poet and novelist Edgar Lee Masters, whose father, Hardin W. Masters, was a supporter of the licensing of saloons. Edgar Lee Masters also believed that Davidson had prevented Hardin Masters from receiving a nomination to Congress. Davidson's marriage to Margaret George, who had been Masters' early childhood sweetheart, likely exacerbated the animosity toward Davidson that is apparent in many of Masters' literary works. Davidson was the subject of Masters' first printed poem, The Minotaur, which refers to a "Bill Davidson" in a prefatory note, and in which "slandering Bill" is the editor of a "vile sheet the 'Democrat'". Davidson was the basis for three of the characters in Masters' Spoon River Anthology: Editor Whedon, who used "great feelings and passions of the human family / For base designs, for cunning ends"; Deacon Taylor, who belonged to "the party of prohibition" but who "had cirrhosis of the liver"; and Robert Davidson, who "grew spiritually fat living off the souls of men." In Masters' last novel, The Tide of Time, the protagonist Leonard Westerfield Atterberry (who was based on Hardin Masters) argues at length with a prohibitionist editor named "William T. Davis," who was clearly based on Davidson. However, there is little evidence that Masters' animosity toward Davidson was shared by others.

== Death and interment ==
William T. Davidson died on January 3, 1915, after having lapsed into a coma the previous week. He was interred in Oak Hill Cemetery in Lewistown. A walking-tour brochure of the cemetery marks the location of the grave of William Davidson and lists the characters in Masters' Spoon River Anthology with which he is associated. The brochure also shows the location of the grave of Margaret George Davidson, who was the basis for the characters of Julia Miller, Amelia Garrick, and Caroline Bronson in Masters' anthology. Two silhouettes of Edgar Lee Masters are located near the Davidson family's monument in the cemetery, signifying that William and Margaret Davidson were related to characters in the anthology.
