= Harvey Lee Ross House =

Historic house in Illinois, United States

- U.S. National Register of Historic Places
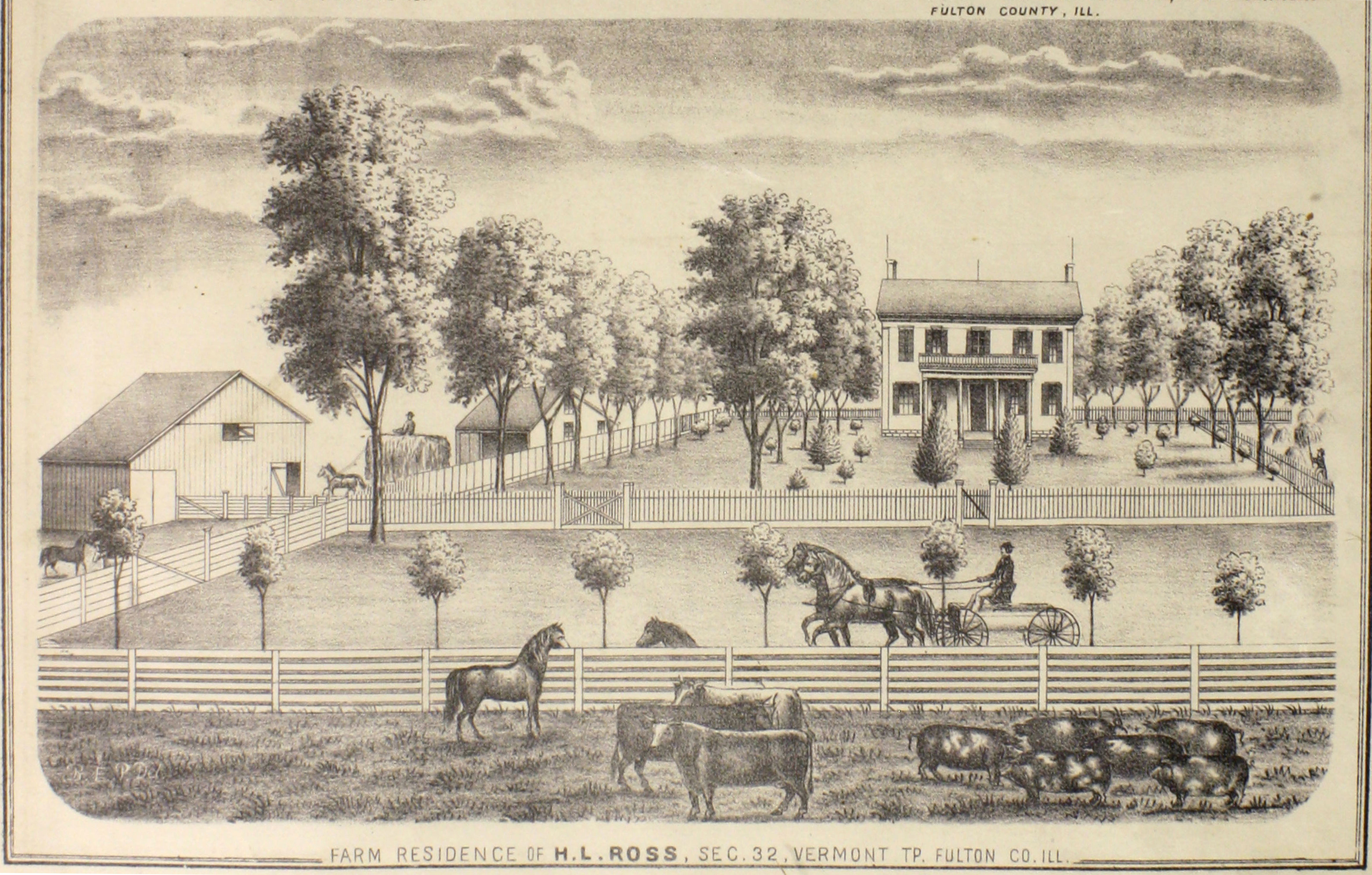
- Drawing of the farm and residence of Harvey Lee Ross, published in 1871. The barn and summer kitchen, shown to southeast of the house in the drawing, are actually to the southwest.

- Location within Illinois Location within the United States
- Location: 602 S. Main Street, Vermont, Illinois
- Coordinates: 40°17′20″N 90°25′41″W
- Built: c. 1858
- Architectural style: Greek revival, with Italianate elements
- NRHP reference No.: 96001295
- Added to NRHP: November 7, 1996

The Harvey Lee Ross House is a two-story frame, side-gabled house built in approximately 1858 on the farm of Harvey Lee Ross near Vermont, Illinois. The house and several outbuildings were added to the National Register of Historic Places (NRHP) in 1996, based on the distinctive characteristics of the architecture and an association with the life of a significant individual from the past. The house features Greek Revival elements with some Italianate detailing. It was originally owned by Harvey Lee Ross, a railroad developer, banker, merchant, and agriculturist.

== History ==
The Harvey Lee Ross house and its associated summer kitchen and barn were built in approximately 1858. The farmstead was occupied by the Ross family until they moved to Macomb, Illinois in 1873. The property was then bought by Aaron A. Bellangee, who lived there with his family until his death in the early 1910s. The Bellangee's daughter Rebecca and her husband Marshall Freeman then acquired the property and lived there from the early 1910s until 1927. From 1927 until the 1940s, Mr. and Mrs. Charles E. McCormick owned the house and land. The property was then purchased by Mr. and Mrs. Otto Ward, who were retired farmers. At the time of the NRHP application, the property was owned by Ralph Malott, his daughter Nelda, and her husband, James C. Fell.

After 1873, a number of additions were made to the house and several outbuildings were constructed. These include a kitchen and bathroom wing, a storage wing, a pantry wing, sheds, a privy, and a chicken coop. Some of the interior features of the house were also modified, including replacement of the original pine flooring on the first floor with oak floors, replacement of some wood paneled doors with French doors, removal of pocket doors, and the addition of carpeting. The majority of the changes appear to have been made in the 1880s and early 1900s.

== Architectural characteristics ==
The basic plan of the two-story, wood-frame house is a variation on the "four-over-four" layout. The first floor consists of a central hall with two rooms to the south and a large parlor on the north. The second floor has a central hall with two rooms on either side. The overall style of the house is Greek Revival, including a one-story front porch with four Doric-inspired wood columns with fluting, six-over-six windows, and an entryway with a divided transom and skylights. There is an ornamental cast-iron railing and balustrade above the porch. The interior of the house also features Greek Revival elements, including fluted window and door woodwork, and a formal parlor with sidelights and transoms. In addition, the house includes some Italianate detailing, such as small decorative brackets above the front entryway.

Outbuildings that are part of the NRHP listing include a one-story, saltbox-shaped summer kitchen; a frame three-portal barn, a frame shed/garage; a storage shed; a machine shed; a chicken coop; and a privy. The summer kitchen and barn, which were constructed at approximately the same time as the house, feature traditional mortise and tenon and pegged construction. The other structures were added subsequently.

== Original owner ==
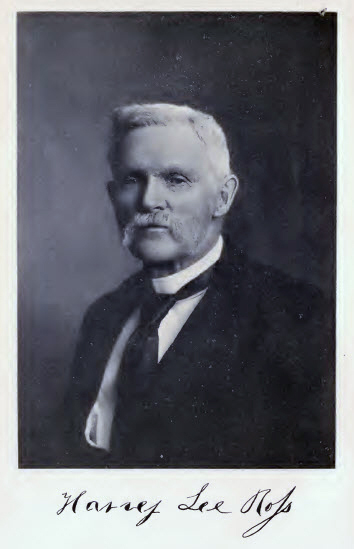
Harvey Lee Ross in his 80th year.

The original owner of the farmstead was Harvey Lee Ross. He was born in Seneca County, New York, on October 10, 1817, the second son (third child) of Ossian M. and Mary (Winans) Ross. In 1821, Harvey Ross moved with his family to Fulton County, Illinois and settled in the area that became Lewistown, which was founded by his father and named for the couple's oldest son, Lewis. After a brief education in the local log schoolhouses, Harvey Ross was employed at age 15 as a mail carrier along a 135-mile route from Springfield to Monmouth, Illinois. One of the post offices along the route was the facility at New Salem, Illinois, where Abraham Lincoln was the postmaster.

In 1836, Ross became a student at Illinois College in Jacksonville, Illinois. His college chum was William H. Herndon, who later became a law partner of Abraham Lincoln. Ross left college after his father's death in January, 1837, in order to manage his late father's business interests in Havana, Illinois. These included running the Havana Hotel and overseeing the ferry across the Illinois River. Ross also served as postmaster at Havana, having been appointed to this position by President Martin Van Buren.

Ross married Jane R. Kirkpatrick on January 1, 1840, in Fulton County, Illinois. The couple had six children.

In 1844, the Ross family moved to land located near Vermont, Illinois, where Ross engaged in farming and stock raising and was also involved in the local mercantile trade. Ross ran a grocery and general store on the Vermont town square, was a grain buyer and shipper, and ran a pork packing plant. In 1859, he opened Fulton County's first bank, the Fulton Bank, located in Vermont. In the 1860s, Ross was a leading promoter of a railroad line through Vermont. He donated funds, gave right-of-way for the railroad line through his property, and donated land for construction of a depot. He also served on the board of directors of the Macomb, Vermont, and Bath Railroad Company.

In 1873, Ross moved to Macomb, Illinois, where he continued farming until 1882. He then moved to Oakland, California, where he was listed in the city directory as a real estate dealer and farmer. At the time that he moved west, Ross owned fourteen farms in McDonough County and several farms in Fulton County. Ross lived in Oakland until his death on January 27, 1907.

While he was in California, Harvey Lee Ross was asked by William T. Davidson, editor of the Fulton Democrat, a newspaper published in Lewistown, to write a series of sketches describing Ross' recollections of life in the early pioneering years of Illinois, particularly of Fulton and Sangamon counties. Written when he was in his 80s, the resulting sketches were first published as a series of articles in the newspaper and then in book form. Included in the book are the author's personal recollections of Abraham Lincoln, Andrew Jackson, and Peter Cartwright, as well as his own autobiography. The book has been of considerable interest to Lincoln collectors.

It has been suggested that Harvey Lee Ross was the basis for the character of Thomas Ross Jr., in Edgar Lee Masters' Spoon River Anthology. However, there is some uncertainty regarding this proposal because Ross does not appear to have been adversely affected by any of his brothers, contrary to what is alleged in the verse:

As for myself I overcame my lower nature
Only to be destroyed by my brother's ambition.

— Thomas Ross, Jr., in Edgar Lee Masters, "Spoon River Anthology"
