= Isaac Newton Walker =

American politician (1803–1899)

Major Isaac Newton Walker
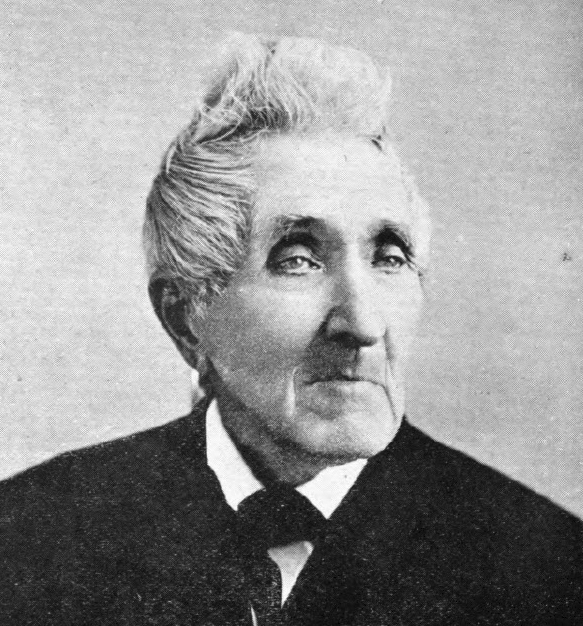

Member of the Illinois House of Representatives
- In office 1838–1840
- Preceded by: Samuel Hackleton
- Succeeded by: Lewis Winans Ross

Personal details
- Born: December 18, 1803 Charlottesville, Virginia, US
- Died: September 14, 1899 (aged 95) Lewistown, Illinois, US
- Resting place: Oak Hill Cemetery; Lewistown, Illinois
- Party: Whig
- Spouse: Ann Eliza Simms (married 1834-1899)
- Children: 4
- Occupation: Farmer, merchant

Isaac Newton Walker (December 18, 1803 – September 14, 1899) was a pioneer farmer and merchant in Illinois, designer of the third Fulton County courthouse, member of the Illinois House of Representatives, and a close personal friend of Abraham Lincoln.

== Personal life and occupation ==
Isaac Newton Walker, generally referred to as Newton Walker, was born on December 18, 1803, in Madison County, Virginia, the son of Merriweather Walker and Elizabeth Kirtley. On May 14, 1834, Walker married Ann Eliza Simms (1814-1904), daughter of Colonel Reuben C. Simms and Frances M. Graves, in Madison County, Virginia. The couple moved to Lewistown, Illinois, in 1835, living on a farm that had been owned by Ossian M. Ross, the founder of Lewistown, who had subsequently moved to Havana, Illinois. The couple had four children: Mary ("Mollie;" 1835-1923), Henrietta (1839-1928), Robert (1844-1932), and Amelia (1847-1935).

Ann Eliza Simms' sisters also moved to Fulton County, and three of them married notable men of the region. Elizabeth M. Simms married David H. Rutledge, brother of Ann Rutledge, who is often considered to have been the sweetheart of Abraham Lincoln; Frances M. Simms married Lewis Winans Ross, a United States Congressman; and Catharine M. Simms married General Leonard F. Ross, a brigadier general in the American Civil War.

Newton Walker was engaged in farming in Lewistown. He was also the owner/proprietor of a general store, dealing in merchandise ranging from "mackerel to French edging."

== Military service ==
In 1824, at the age of 21, Walker was appointed a major in the Virginia militia. He was then appointed to the command of the escort of the Marquis de Lafayette during Lafayette's fourth visit to the United States (1824-1825), accompanying him throughout Virginia. Walker continued to be addressed as "Major" throughout his life and in subsequent historical accounts.

== Abraham Lincoln connection ==
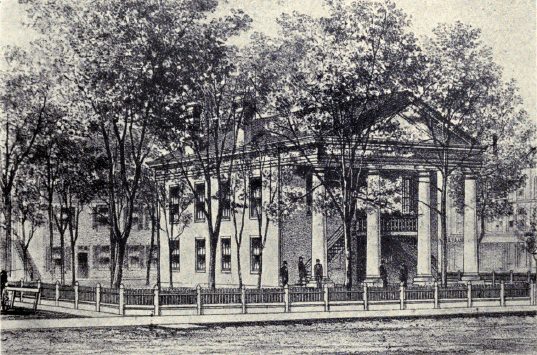
Sketch of the "old" (third) Fulton County courthouse, designed by Major Walker, illustrating the outside staircase and the sandstone pillars in front.

Shortly after moving to Lewistown, Major Walker was asked to design and supervise the construction of the Fulton County courthouse (actually, the third courthouse in Lewistown, and often referred to as the "old Court House"). This courthouse was built in 1838 in the Greek Revival style and featured four sandstone columns in front that were quarried from the Spoon River bottom. An outside staircase led to the upper floor. In this building, prominent local attorneys such as Abraham Lincoln, Edward Dickinson Baker and James Shields argued cases of law, and Stephen A. Douglas was a presiding judge. Lincoln and Douglas each gave speeches from between the columns, including Lincoln's famous "Back to the Declaration of Independence" speech on August 17, 1858. This courthouse burned in a fire of controversial origin on December 13, 1894.

After serving as a Fulton County supervisor, Walker was elected as a Whig to the Illinois House of Representatives in 1838, representing Fulton County. Abraham Lincoln was also a member of the Illinois House of Representatives at that time, representing Sangamon County, and was a fellow member of the Whig party. Despite having the same party affiliation, the two men had political differences, and Major Walker in his later years remarked that he used to give Lincoln "Hail Columbia." Walker strongly opposed the building of the Illinois Central Railroad, which was a major measure before the state legislature at the time, whereas Lincoln was a staunch supporter of its construction. Nevertheless, the two men became good friends during their time in the legislature. Major Walker recalled entertaining Lincoln by playing the fiddle in the boarding house near the capitol building in Vandalia, Illinois, where Walker was staying.

The friendship between Walker and Lincoln continued after Walker left the legislature. Lincoln was a frequent guest in the Walker home in Lewistown, where Major Walker often played his fiddle for Lincoln in return for Lincoln's stories and anecdotes. Lincoln had his last meal in Lewistown in Major Walker's home on August 17, 1858, following Lincoln's address from the courthouse. The next morning, Walker drove Lincoln to Canton, Illinois, in his carriage. According to Walker, the two men discussed politics on the way, including Lincoln's high opinion of William H. Seward, then a U.S. Senator from New York who would later serve as Secretary of State during Lincoln's presidency.

== Death and legacy ==
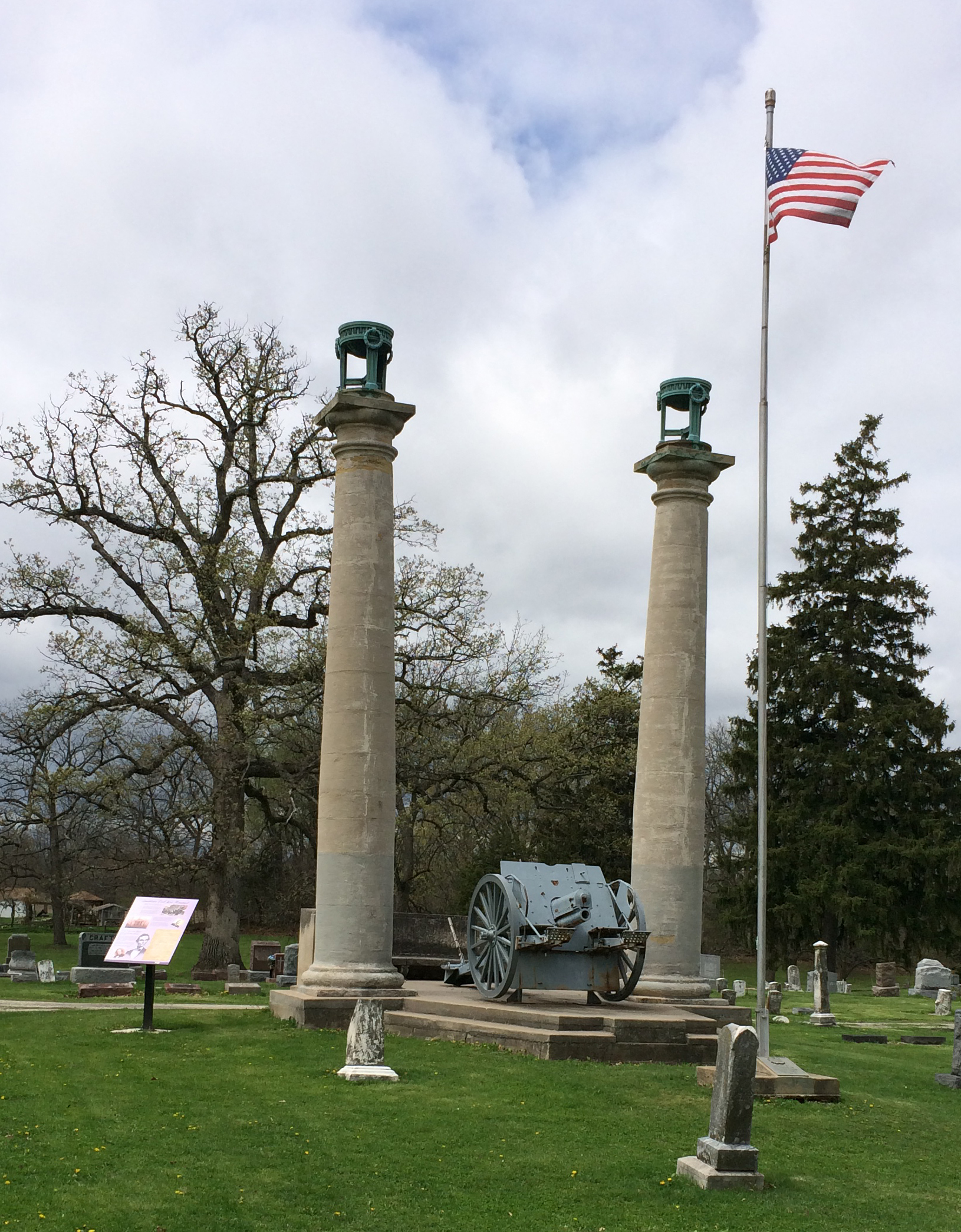
"Lincoln pillars" from the third Fulton County courthouse, now located in the soldiers' memorial in Oak Hill Cemetery.

Major Walker died in Lewistown on September 14, 1899. He had been seriously ill with pneumonia earlier that year, and at the time of his death was nearly blind and deaf. Following his death, a number of newspapers throughout the country published his obituary, including The Denver Evening Post and the New York Tribune. Walker was interred in Lewistown's Oak Hill Cemetery, which is slightly southwest of Walker's house. Oak Hill Cemetery is also the location of the "Lincoln pillars:" two sandstone columns that were retrieved from the burnt remains of the old Fulton County courthouse that Major Walker had designed.

Walker is mentioned by name in Edgar Lee Masters' Spoon River Anthology:<

And Major Walker who had talked
With venerable men of the revolution ...

This verse is from "The Hill," the introductory section of the work, and it likely refers to Walker having known such men as Thomas Jefferson, James Madison, and Henry Clay when he lived in Virginia.

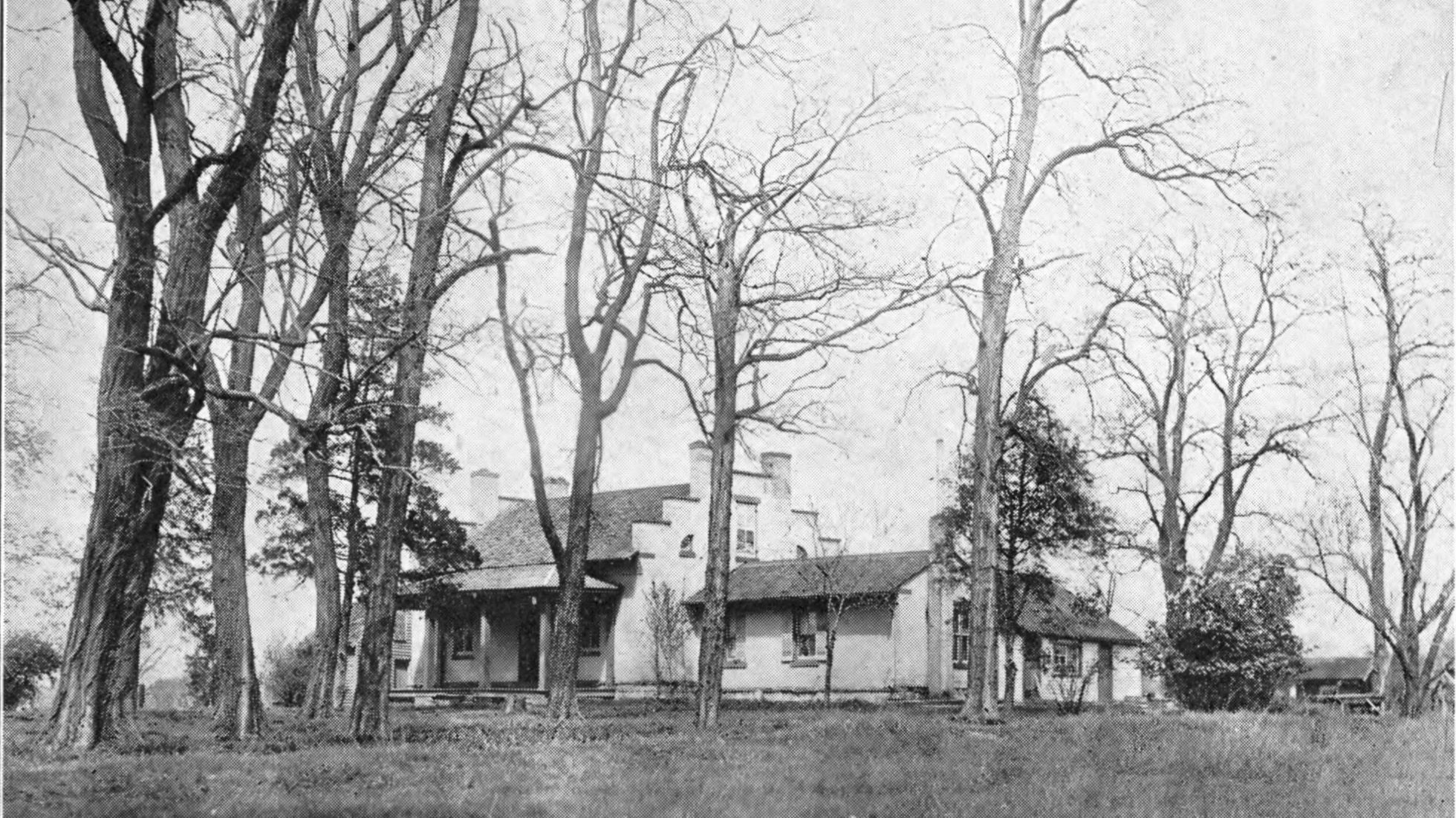
View of the house built by Major Walker with its distinctive corbie gables.

The burning of the courthouse that Walker designed is also immortalized in Masters' Spoon River Anthology, in the section "Silas Dement:"

And the Spoon River ladder company
Came with a dozen buckets and began to pour water
On the glorious bonfire, growing hotter,
Higher and brighter, till the walls fell in,
And the limestone columns where Lincoln stood
Crashed like trees when the woodman fells them ...

As has been noted, Masters engaged in poetic license regarding the effects of the fire. The columns were made of sandstone, not limestone, and they remained upright after the fire.

Major Walker's house, built in 1851, is still standing at 1127 N. Main Street in Lewistown. This 1 1/2-story brick building with hard maple flooring and cherry wood trim was built on property that Walker had bought from Ossian Ross. The house is distinguished by corbie gables at the north and south ends. Blueprints of the house plan and floor plan are available from the Library of Congress as part of the Historic American Buildings Survey collection. The Walker house is slated for restoration to its original condition by the group Willing to Invest in Lewistown's Dream (WILD) in a project named "Restoration 1127."
