= Oak Hill Cemetery (Lewistown, Illinois) =

- U.S. National Register of Historic Places
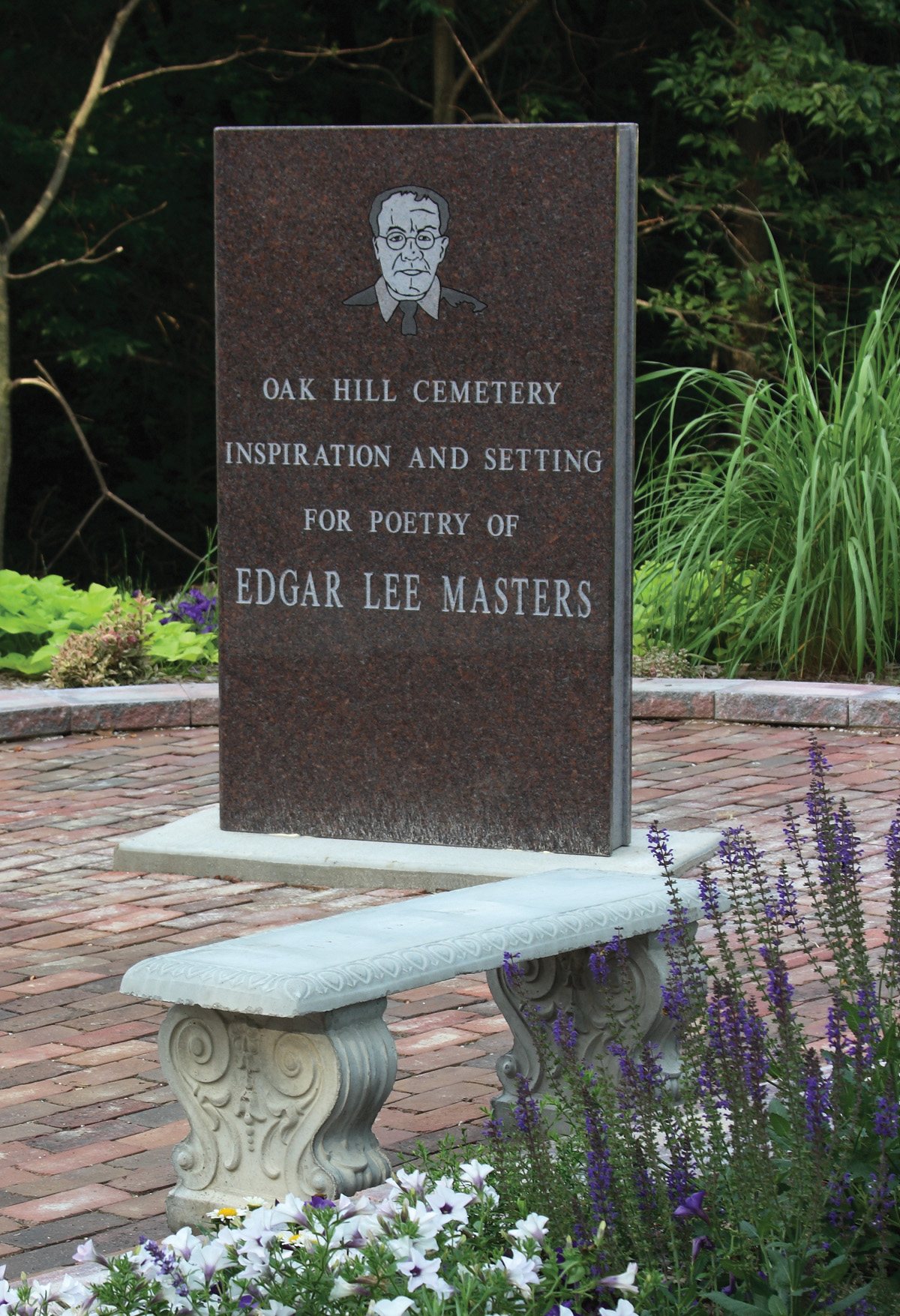
- Edgar Lee Masters memorial at the south entrance to Oak Hill Cemetery

- Location within Illinois Location within the United States
- Location: 1000 Blk. N. Main Street, Lewistown, Illinois, US
- Coordinates: 40°24′08″N 90°09′24″W
- Area: Approximately 30 acres
- NRHP reference No.: 95001240
- Added to NRHP: November 13, 1995

Oak Hill Cemetery is located in the city of Lewistown, Illinois. It lies along Illinois Route 97 and 100 in the 1000 block of North Main Street. The south part of the cemetery is on the National Register of Historic Places.

== History ==
The first cemetery in Lewistown, Illinois, was located on city lot 16, on land donated for this purpose by Ossian M. Ross, the founder of Lewistown. This cemetery was abandoned after a few years due to pressures from commercial development, and many of the bodies were reinterred in what is now Oak Hill Cemetery. The first tract of land in Oak Hill Cemetery was located in what is now the southeast corner and was approximately one acre in size. The second tract of land, north and west of the original section, was deeded to the Lewistown Cemetery Association in 1865 by Reuben R. and Ruth McDowell. Subsequent additions have brought the total size to approximately 30 acres. Only the south portion of the cemetery, an area of approximately 13 acres, is included in the National Register of Historic Places.

The first interment in Oak Hill Cemetery was Maria (Ross) Coulter, sister of Lewistown's founder, Ossian Ross. However, the dates of her death and interment are unknown. The earliest date of death on a headstone in Oak Hill Cemetery is 1829, but it is unclear whether that date refers to a new burial or to a body being reinterred from the first cemetery.

Oak Hill Cemetery is still in active use. As of 2015, there are more than 5,000 individuals interred there. Among them are some of the early settlers of the Lewistown area, including members of the Beadles, Davidson, Phelps, Ross, and Walker families.

== Edgar Lee Masters connection ==
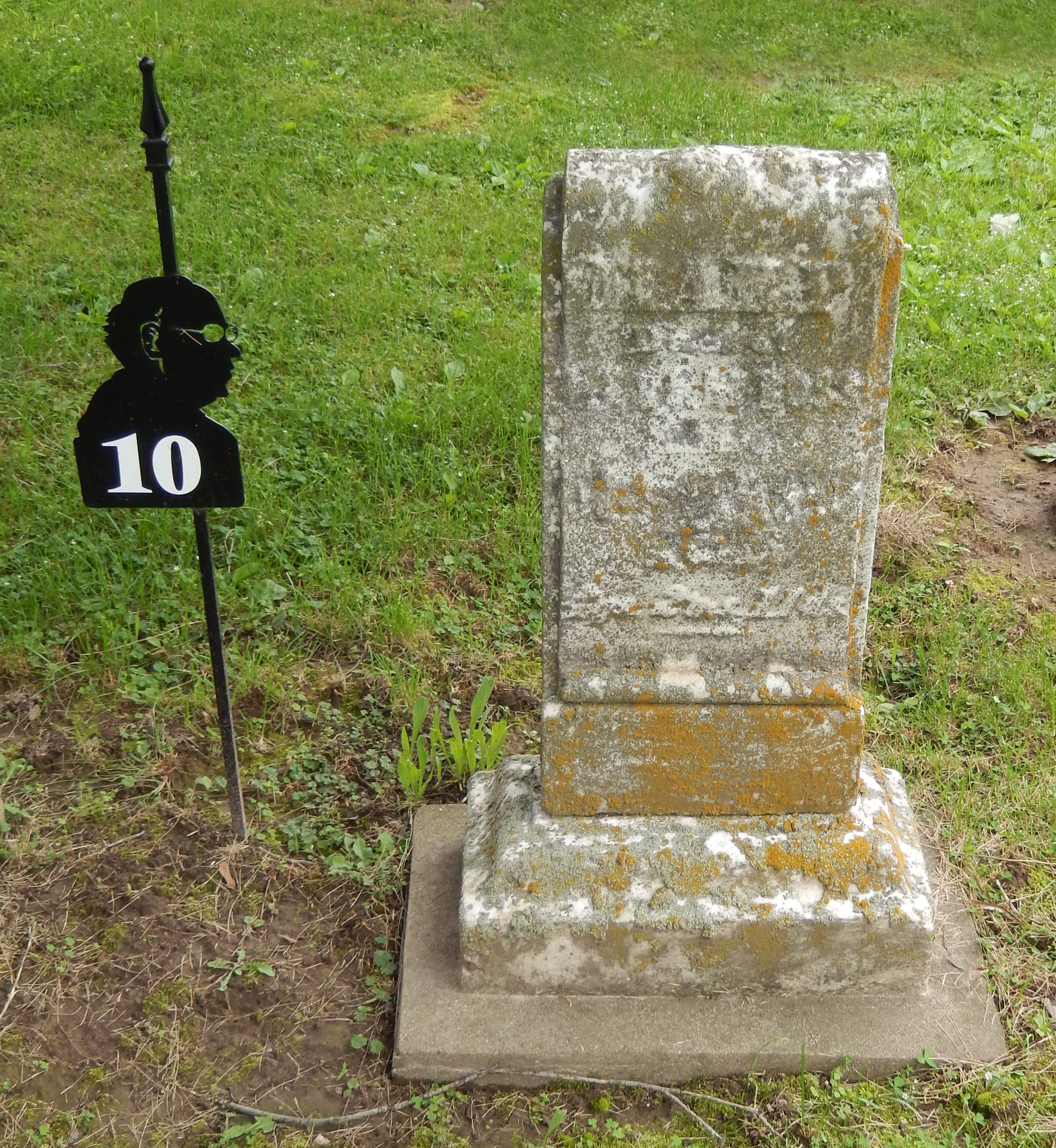
Silhouette of Edgar Lee Masters beside the gravestone of Mary Ross ("Mary McNeely" in Masters' Anthology).

Oak Hill Cemetery provided the inspiration for Edgar Lee Masters' Spoon River Anthology, and many of the characters in this work have been linked to individuals interred in the cemetery. Oak Hill Cemetery is often referred to as "The Hill," in reference to the first section of Masters' Anthology.

A walking tour brochure is available from the City of Lewistown that lists the characters in the verse and their counterparts in the cemetery. This brochure also includes a map of the cemetery layout and the location of the gravesites of individuals linked to the Anthology. The gravesites of these individuals are indicated by numbered markers that are located beside the corresponding gravestones and are shaped in the silhouette of Edgar Lee Masters. There are 40 such markers, representing 52 characters from the Anthology (some of the individuals interred in the cemetery correspond to more than one character in the Anthology). However, there is still some uncertainty as to the exact relationship between the individuals interred in the cemetery and the characters in the Spoon River Anthology. According to Masters, 66 of the anthology characters correspond to persons buried in the cemetery.

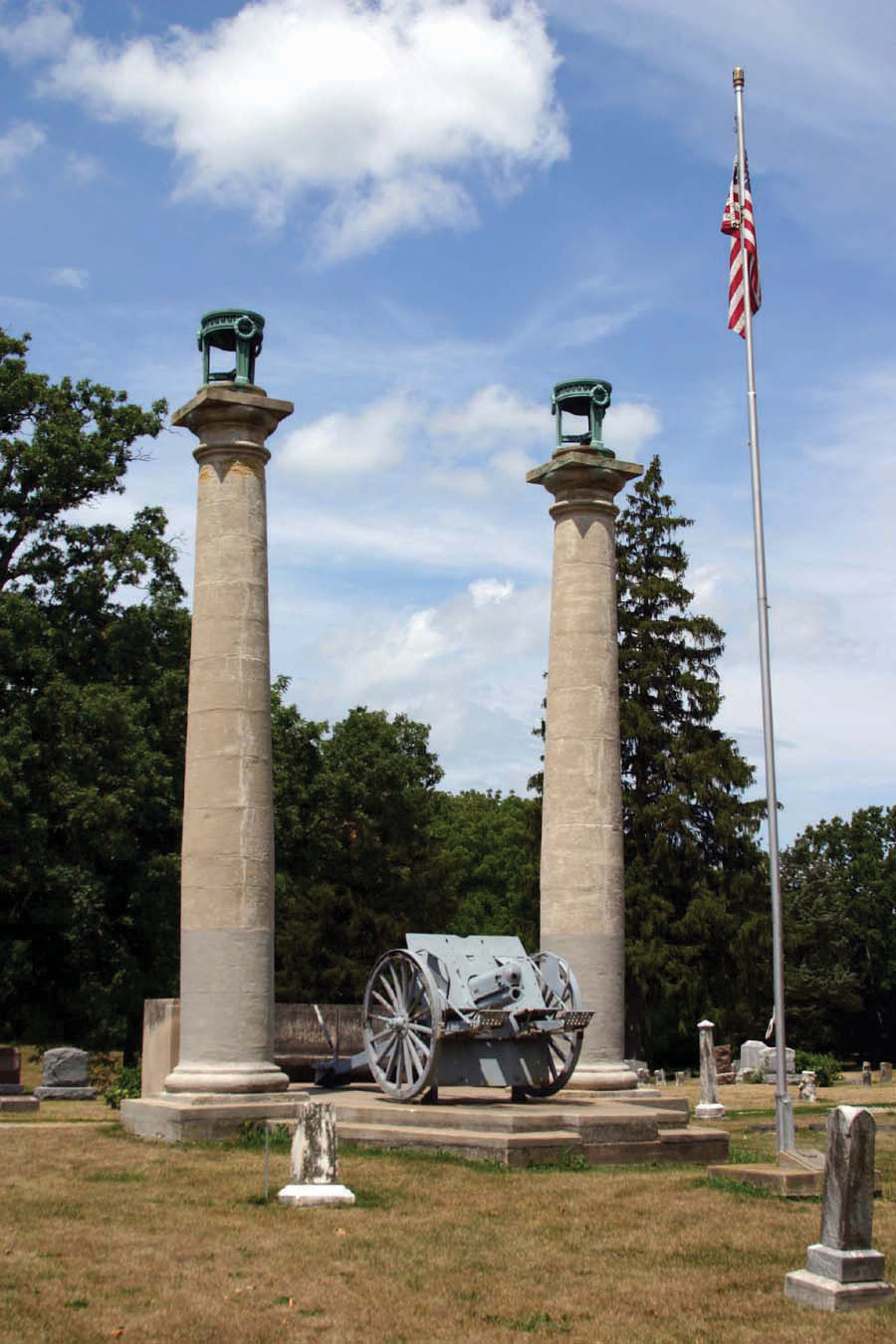
Civil War memorial with two sandstone columns from the old Fulton County courthouse.

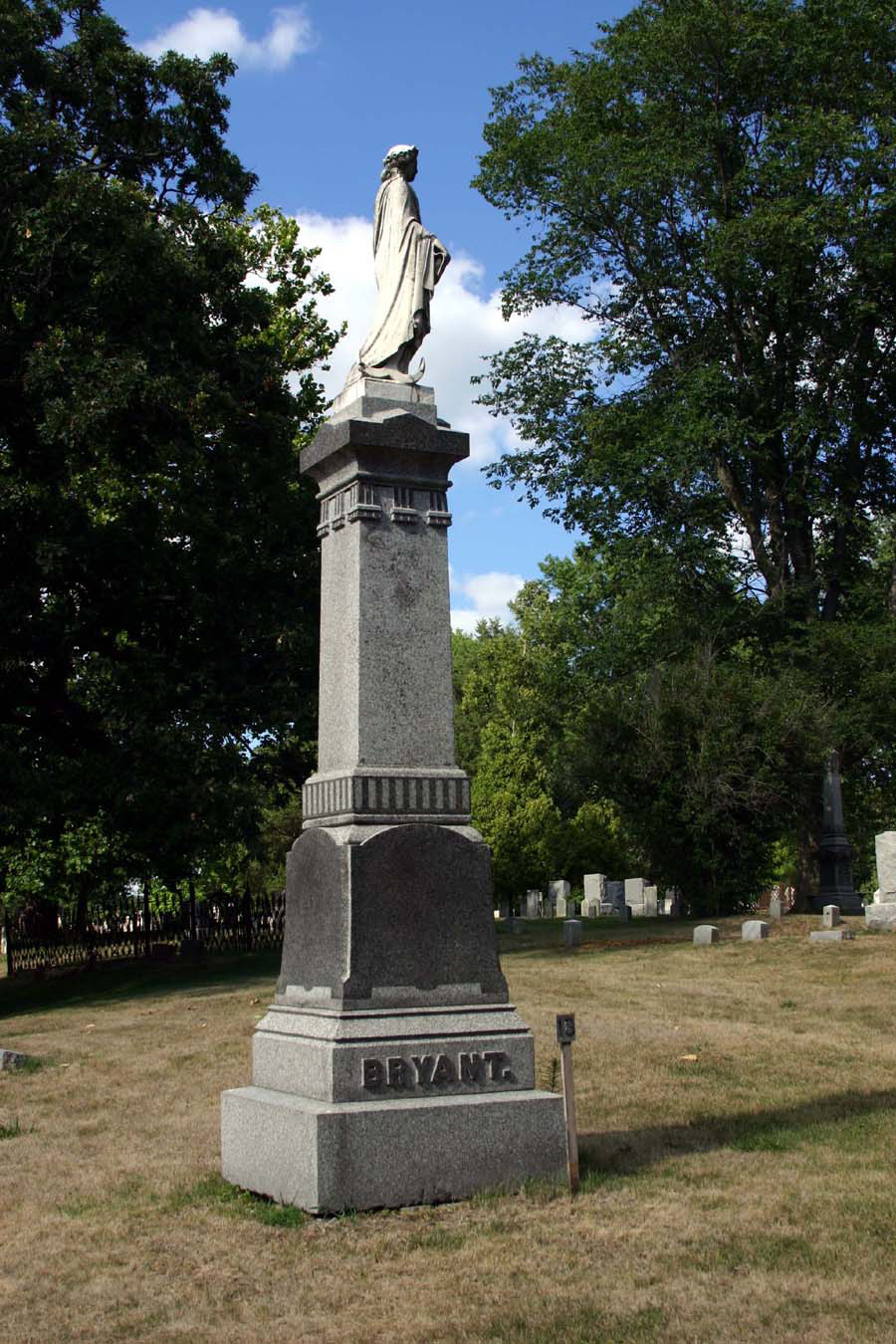
William Cullen Bryant memorial.

== Prominent cemetery features ==
Located at the south entry of the cemetery is a memorial to Edgar Lee Masters, highlighting his close relationship to the cemetery. Nearby is a "Looking for Lincoln" exhibit that is devoted to Masters. In a central part of the cemetery there is a Civil War memorial that includes a pair of sandstone columns (the so-called "Lincoln pillars") that were quarried from the Spoon River bottom. These columns were salvaged from the old Fulton County courthouse (actually, the third courthouse in Lewistown), which was burned by a fire of uncertain origin on December 13, 1894. On separate occasions, Abraham Lincoln and Stephen A. Douglas each gave speeches from between the columns when the columns were in their original location in front of the courthouse. Lincoln's famous "Back to the Declaration of Independence" speech was given there on August 17, 1858.

Perhaps the tallest monument in the cemetery is the memorial for William Cullen Bryant. This was not the poet William Cullen Bryant, but a distant relative who was the inspiration for the character "Percy Bysshe Shelley" in the Spoon River Anthology. The memorial consists of a marble shaft that is topped by a statue of a woman.

== Notable interments ==
- Thomas A. Boyd (1830–1897), United States Congressman
- William S. Jewell (1867–1956), State's attorney for Fulton County, Illinois
- Ossian M. Ross (1790–1837), Founder of Lewistown, Illinois
- Lewis Winans Ross (1812–1895), United States Congressman
- Leonard F. Ross (1823–1901), Brigadier General in the American Civil War
- John W. Ross (1841–1902), Mayor of Washington, D.C.
- Newton Walker (1803–1899), Designer of the third Fulton County courthouse (source of the "Lincoln pillars") and close friend of Abraham Lincoln
