= Thomas A. Boyd =

American politician

Member of the U.S. House of Representatives from Illinois's 9th district
- In office March 4, 1877 – March 3, 1881
- Preceded by: Richard H. Whiting
- Succeeded by: John H. Lewis

Member of the Illinois Senate
- In office 1866–1870

Personal details
- Born: June 25, 1830 Bedford, Pennsylvania
- Died: May 28, 1897 (aged 66) Lewistown, Illinois
- Party: Republican

Thomas Alexander Boyd (June 25, 1830 – May 28, 1897) was a U.S. representative from Illinois.

== Biography ==
Born near Bedford in Adams County, Pennsylvania, Boyd attended the public schools. He was graduated from Marshall College, Mercersburg, Pennsylvania, in 1848. He studied law in Chambersburg, Pennsylvania. He was admitted to the bar and commenced practice in Bedford, Pennsylvania. He moved to Lewistown, Illinois, in 1856 and engaged in the practice of law until 1861. During the Civil War enlisted in the Seventeenth Regiment, Illinois Infantry, in 1861 and obtained the commission of captain. He served as member of the State senate in 1866 and was reelected in 1870.

Boyd was elected as a Republican to the Forty-fifth and Forty-sixth Congresses (March 4, 1877 – March 3, 1881). He was not a candidate for renomination in 1880. He resumed the practice of law. He died in Lewistown, Illinois, May 28, 1897. He was interred in Oak Hill Cemetery.

U.S. House of Representatives
Preceded by Richard H. Whiting	Member of the U.S. House of Representatives from Illinois's 9th congressional district 1877 – 1881	Succeeded by John H. Lewis
