= Ossian M. Ross =

American pioneer

Major Ossian M. Ross
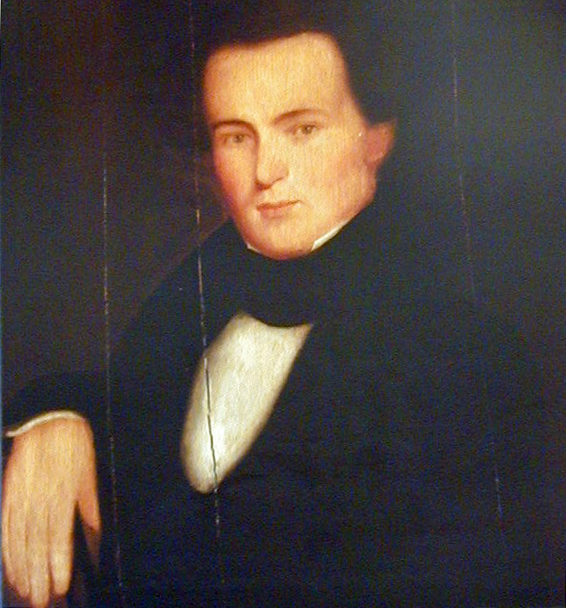
- Portrait of Ossian M. Ross on wood, probably painted in New York around 1820 before he left for Illinois.
- Born: August 16, 1790; Dutchess County, New York, US
- Died: January 20, 1837 (aged 46); Havana, Illinois, US
- Burial place: Oak Hill Cemetery; Lewistown, Illinois
- Spouse: Mary (Polly) Winans
- Children: 6
- Military career
- Allegiance: United States of America
- Rank: Major
- Conflicts: War of 1812; Winnebago War
- Other work: Farmer, merchant, hotel owner, ferry owner

Ossian M. Ross (August 16, 1790 – January 20, 1837) was a pioneer farmer, stock-raiser, and merchant in Illinois, who served as a major in the War of 1812 and subsequently founded the Illinois towns of Lewistown and Havana, and who also played a prominent role in establishing Fulton and Mason counties in that state.

== Early life in New York State ==
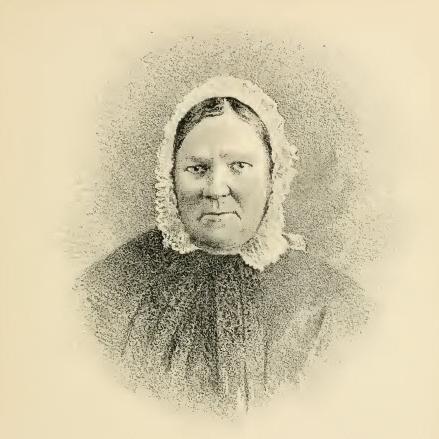
Mary Winans, wife of Ossian Ross (source: History of Fulton County, Illinois).

Ossian Ross was born in Dutchess County, New York, on August 16, 1790, the son of Joseph Ross and Abigail Lee. He was married to Mary (Polly) Winans on July 7, 1811, in Seneca County, New York. While living in New York, he engaged in agricultural pursuits. Ossian and Mary Ross had three children during this period: Lewis Winans (1812–1895), Harriet M. (1816–1890), and Harvey Lee (1817–1907).

== Military service ==
Ross served as a major under General Jacob Brown in the War of 1812. Following the war, he was given a half-section (320 acres) of land in the Illinois Military Tract, a region that was allocated by the United States Government as bounty lands to compensate volunteer soldiers for services rendered during the war. Ross later served in Captain Constant's Company, Colonel Neale's Detachment, of the Illinois Mounted Riflemen in the Winnebago Indian Disturbances of 1827.

== Life as an Illinois pioneer ==
Ossian Ross moved to Illinois in 1821, shortly after the territory became a state, in order to claim his allotment in the Military Tract. It was Ross’ apparent intention to establish a town in that region, because he brought with him a blacksmith, a carpenter, and other workmen. Ossian Ross, his family, and his companions settled in an area that is now known as Lewistown, Illinois, a town which he founded and named after his oldest son, Lewis. Ossian Ross donated a quarter-section of his land to the town for the establishment of a public square, courthouse, jail, church, and Masonic temple. Ross himself was a Freemason: a member of the Frontier Lodge and active in the Grand Lodge of Illinois. Ossian and Mary Ross had three additional children in Illinois: Lucinda Caroline (1821–1900), who married William Kellogg); Leonard Fulton (1822–1901); and Pike Clinton (1825–1890).

Ross played a major role in the establishment and governance of Fulton County, which originally extended as far north as Chicago, Illinois, and had Lewistown as its county seat. The first election in Fulton County was held on April 14, 1823, in the log cabin home of Ossian Ross. Although he did not win a position in that election (he ran for sheriff but lost narrowly to William Eads), Ross later became the county's first postmaster, the first justice of the peace, the second sheriff, and the third treasurer. Ossian's brother John N. Ross was the county's first surveyor, and his brother Thomas Lee Ross was the first assessor and county treasurer. Abraham Lincoln received his appointment as postmaster of New Salem, Illinois, through Ossian Ross' recommendation, and Ossian's son Harvey Lee assisted Lincoln in sorting and delivering the mail. During the great debate over the slavery question in Illinois in 1824, Ossian Ross, together with Methodist minister Peter Cartwright, successfully championed the anti-slavery cause in Fulton county.

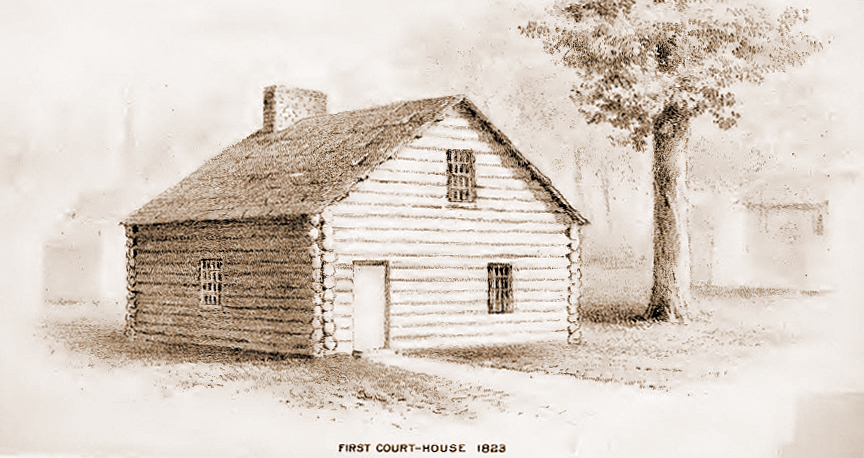
Drawing of the original Fulton County courthouse, situated in Lewistown, Illinois, on land donated for this purpose by Ossian Ross (source: History of Fulton County, Illinois).

As justice of the peace, Ross authored a legal document that has been cited as a prime example of pioneer ingenuity and practicality. Prior to receiving his commission as justice of the peace, Ross was asked to marry a pioneer couple. In response, he wrote the following document: "To All the World Greetings – Know ye, that John Smith and Poly Myers is hereby entitled to go together and do as old folks does anywhere inside of Copperas precinct, and when my commission comes I am to marry em good and proper, and date em back to kiver accidents. O. M. R. Justice Peace."

In 1827, Ossian Ross, John Holcomb, and Sheldon Lockwood were appointed by the county commissioners’ court of Fulton County to map out the best route from the mouth of the Spoon River (near Havana) to the lead mines near Galena, Illinois. Their report, published in the Illinois Intelligencer, formed the basis for the Lewistown Trail, which ran from Springfield, Illinois, to Galena, Illinois, via Lewistown and was one of the main routes to the Galena lead mines between 1827 and 1837. The influx of job seekers to the lead mines from Missouri and southern Illinois along the Lewistown Trail and other routes is likely to be the major reason that Illinois was called the "Sucker State" throughout much of the 19th century (i.e., the lure of the mines "sucked" men into Illinois from neighboring states).

Ossian Ross moved to what is now Havana, Illinois, in 1829, where he laid out the town, ran the Havana Hotel (where Abraham Lincoln was a frequent guest), and operated Ross’ Ferry, which was located at the only place between the Illinois towns of Beardstown and Pekin where the Illinois River could be crossed. After Ross left Lewistown, his homestead there was purchased by Major Isaac Newton Walker, a member of the Illinois State Legislature and a close friend of Abraham Lincoln.

While living in Lewistown and Havana, Ossian Ross engaged in land speculation, purchasing warranty deeds, quitclaim deeds, and tax deeds, typically for good quality land. Much of the land was then sold at roughly a 25 percent profit. In addition to providing a source of income, some of the land speculation by local businessmen such as Ross also served as a valuable resource for local farmers. For example, Ross' frequent practice of buying land with quitclaim deeds and then selling the land back to the original owner at the auction price in essence provided a source of loans to farmers in the absence of banks, which did not exist in the region until the 1850s.

== Death and legacy ==
Ossian Ross died in Havana on January 20, 1837, of unknown causes. He was interred in the Oak Hill Cemetery in Lewistown in a large plot of land devoted to the Ross family. A collection of Ross family papers, including a business ledger maintained by Ossian Ross as well as correspondence and other documents of members of the Ross family, is housed in the Abraham Lincoln Presidential Library in Springfield, Illinois. The final pages of Ossian Ross' business ledger consist of a list of items that were purchased from the personal property of his estate by his son Lewis, totaling $3,392.24.

== Notable descendants ==
Ossian and Mary Ross established a family that became foremost in the history of the Illinois River Valley and beyond. Among the prominent individuals of this family were their sons Lewis Winans Ross, a United States congressman; Leonard F. Ross, a lawyer and stock-raiser who served as a brigadier general during the American Civil War; Harvey Lee Ross, who compiled and edited an influential history of early Illinois and whose house is listed on the National Register of Historic Places; and Pike C. Ross, a pioneer doctor and pharmacist who was associated with the founding of the Phi Alpha Literary Society. John Wesley Ross, son of Lewis Winans Ross and a grandson of Ossian and Mary Ross, served as postmaster of Washington, D.C., and as president of the District of Columbia Board of Commissioners, a position equivalent to mayor. Robert B. Chiperfield, a great-grandson of Ossian and Mary Ross, was a United States representative from Illinois who served as chair of the House Committee on Foreign Affairs. Betty Ross Clarke, a great-granddaughter of Ossian and Mary Ross, was an American stage actress and film starlet. Jean Ross Howard Phelan, a second great-granddaughter of Ossian and Mary Ross, was a founding member of the Whirly-Girls International Women Helicopter Pilots.
