= Reed F. Cutler =

American politician and lawyer

Reed F. Cutler (January 31, 1887 – December 28, 1964) was an American politician and lawyer.

Born on a farm in Union Township, Fulton County, Illinois, Reid went to Avon High School. He then went to Knox College, University of Illinois, Northwestern University School of Law, and received his law degree from Chicago–Kent College of Law. He taught school and served as principal. He was admitted to the Illinois bar in 1915 and practiced law in Lewistown, Illinois. In 1917, Cutler served as state's attorney for Fulton County and was a Republican. From 1923 until 1955, Cutler served in the Illinois House of Representatives. Cutler died in a hospital in Peoria, Illinois.
