= Lewis Winans Ross =

American politician (1812–1895)

Colonel Lewis Winans Ross
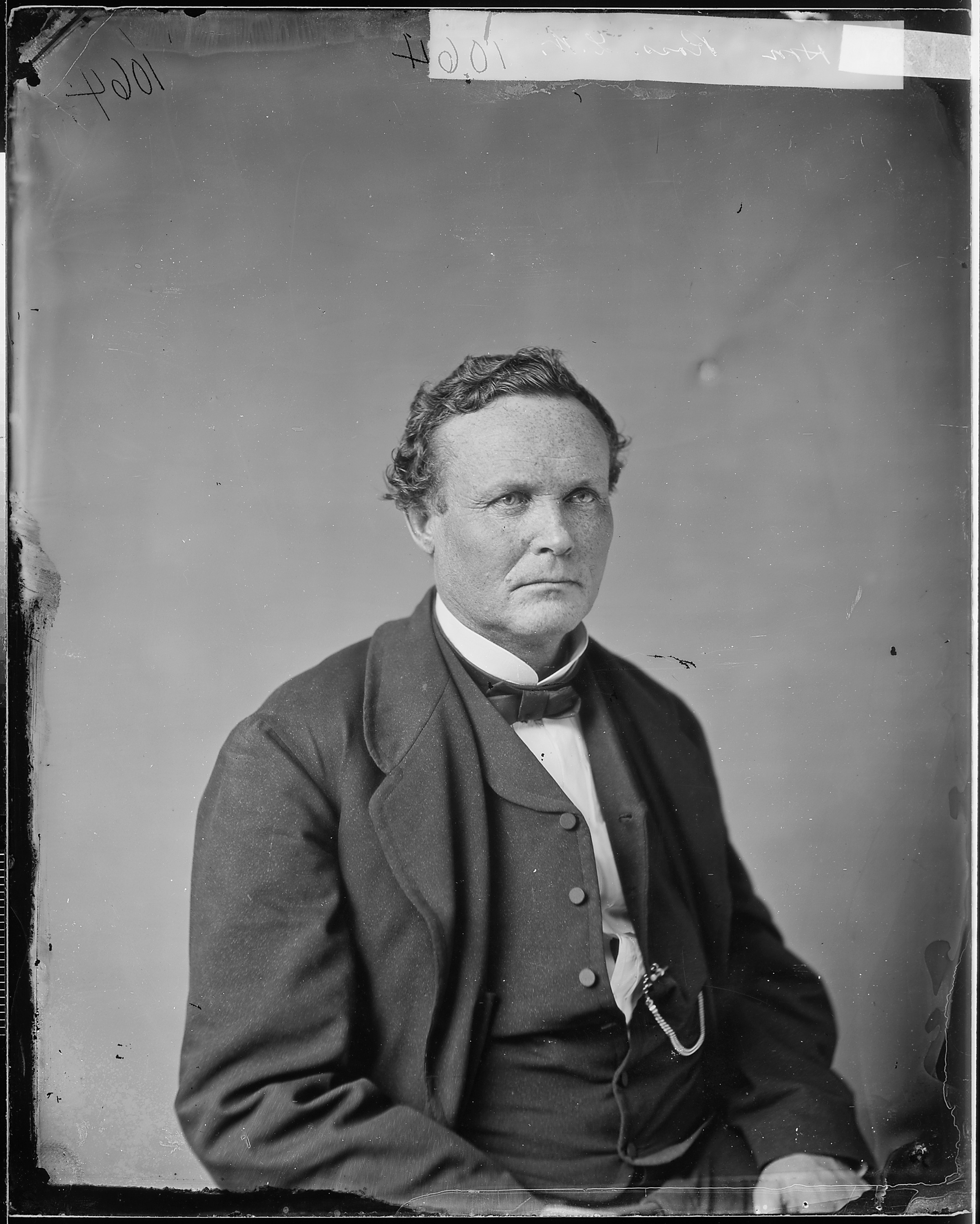
- Lewis W. Ross photographed by Mathew Brady ca. 1865

Member of the Illinois House of Representatives
- In office 1840–1842
- Preceded by: Isaac Newton Walker
- Succeeded by: Horace Turner

Member of the Illinois House of Representatives
- In office 1844–1846
- Preceded by: Horace Turner
- Succeeded by: Reuben McDowell

Member of the U.S. House of Representatives from Illinois's 9th district
- In office March 4, 1863 – March 3, 1869
- Preceded by: William J. Allen
- Succeeded by: Thompson W. McNeely

Personal details
- Born: December 8, 1812 Dutchess County, New York, US
- Died: October 29, 1895 (aged 82) Lewistown, Illinois, US
- Resting place: Oak Hill Cemetery; Lewistown, Illinois
- Party: Democratic
- Spouse: Frances Mildred Simms (1822–1902)
- Children: 12
- Education: Illinois College
- Occupation: Attorney, merchant, banker

Military service
- Rank: Sergeant, Captain
- Battles/wars: Black Hawk War; Mexican–American War

Lewis Winans Ross (December 8, 1812 – October 29, 1895) was an American attorney, merchant, and politician. He served two non-consecutive terms on the Illinois House of Representatives from 1840 to 1842 and 1844 to 1846, and was U.S. Representative from Illinois's 9th congressional district between 1863 and 1869. He was widely known as an antiwar Peace Democrat or Copperhead during the American Civil War.

== Early life ==
Born near Seneca Falls, New York, on December 8, 1812, Lewis Ross was the oldest son of Ossian M. and Mary (Winans) Ross. In 1820, Lewis Ross moved with his family to Illinois, where his father had been given land in the Illinois Military Tract in return for military service in the War of 1812. In 1821, the family settled in an area that later became Lewistown, Illinois, named for Lewis Ross by his father. Lewis Ross received his early education in pioneer schools, and then attended Illinois College in Jacksonville, Illinois, graduating in 1838. He studied law with Josiah Lamborn, a noted lawyer of the day, and was admitted to the bar, commencing the practice of law in Lewistown in 1839.

== Marriage and children ==
Lewis Ross married Frances Mildred Simms (1822–1902) in Lewistown, Illinois, on June 13, 1839. Lewis and Frances Ross had 12 children: John Wesley Ross (1841–1902), a distinguished attorney who served as president of the Washington, D. C., Board of Commissioners; Mary Frances Ross (1843–1844); Ossian Reuben Ross (1845–1863), who committed suicide while a student at the University of Michigan; Ellen Caroline Ross (1846–1880); Lewis Cass "Lute" Ross (1848–1916); Frank Rutledge Ross (1851–1886); Henry Lee Ross (1852–1856); Alice Ross (1854–1855); Pike Clinton Ross (1855–1917); Frances Walker Ross (1857–1885); Jennie L. Ross (1859–1941); and an unnamed daughter who died in infancy (her gravestone is marked "Babe").

== Military service ==
Ross served in Captain Constant's Company, Colonel Neale's Detachment, of the Illinois Mounted Riflemen in the Winnebago Indian Disturbances of 1827. He also saw service in the Black Hawk War of 1832 as a sergeant in Bogart's Brigade, Captain John Sain's Company, Odd Battalion of Mounted Rangers. During the Mexican–American War, Ross organized a company of volunteers (Company K) that was assigned to the 4th Illinois Infantry, commanded by Colonel Edward D. Baker, and Ross was elected captain of the company. Two of Lewis Ross' brothers, First Lieutenant Leonard F. Ross and Private Pike C. Ross, were among those who served under him in Company K. (Note: Several newspaper accounts of Lewis Ross' death stated that he had participated in both the Battle of Veracruz and the Battle of Cerro Gordo. However, a letter from Ross to his wife, dated April 8, 1847, and written while he was on board the General Worth on his way to New Orleans, states that Vera Cruz had already been taken by that time.) In 1861, Illinois Governor Richard Yates offered Ross a commission as colonel of volunteers, but Ross declined the offer. Nevertheless, Lewis Ross was often addressed as Colonel Ross throughout his later life and in various histories concerning the period.

== Political service ==
Lewis Ross served as a member of the Illinois House of Representatives from 1840 to 1842 (during which time Abraham Lincoln was also a member of the legislature), and again from 1844 to 1846. In 1860, Ross was an unsuccessful candidate for the office of Lieutenant Governor of Illinois on the Democratic ticket. Ross served as member of the Illinois State Constitutional Conventions in 1862 and again in 1870. The proposed changes to the state constitution that were introduced in 1862 (known as the "Copperhead constitution") were not ratified by the voters. However, Ross played a prominent role in the development of the Constitution of Illinois that was ratified in 1870. Ross was elected as a Democrat to the Thirty-eighth, Thirty-ninth, and Fortieth United States Congresses (serving March 4, 1863 – March 3, 1869).

While in Congress, Ross served as a member of the House Committees on Agriculture and Indian Affairs. He also served as a member of the "Doolittle Committee", a Congressional Joint Special Committee chaired by James R. Doolittle that investigated the condition of the Indian tribes and the way they were being treated by the military and civil authorities of the United States. Among its other activities, this committee investigated the Sand Creek Massacre of 1864, also known as the Chivington Massacre, in which members of the Colorado Territory militia, led by Colonel John Chivington, attacked a village of peaceful Cheyenne and Arapaho Indians.

== Political views ==
Ross' political views during the Civil War generally corresponded to those of the antiwar Peace Democrats or Copperheads. He was a close personal friend of Stephen A. Douglas and was an ardent supporter of Douglas' senatorial and presidential campaigns. Following Douglas' death in 1861, Ross continued to espouse the late Senator Douglas' political views regarding the Civil War. In an address to the U. S. House of Representatives in 1864, Ross invoked the late Senator Douglas and called for a cessation of the conflict through "mutual concessions and a fair and just compromise." Because of his views on the war, Ross was suspected of being a Southern sympathizer by some of his fellow Illinoisans, and during the draft riots in Fulton County during the war, a cannon was reportedly trained on his house for several days. Nevertheless, Ross' position reflected that of many of his fellow citizens of Fulton County, as evidenced by the fact that he was twice re-elected to Congress.

During the Reconstruction Era following the Civil War, Congressman Ross generally tended to favor the moderate position taken by President Andrew Johnson, and he opposed the policies that were promoted by the Radical Republicans. In a speech to the U.S. House of Representatives in 1866, Ross remarked that he supported President Johnson's veto of the Freedmen's Bureau, a veto that had been overturned by Congress. Ross contended that the bureau discriminated against white citizens who might need government assistance following the war. He also expressed continuing regret that the views of Senators Crittenden and Douglas advocating compromise had not prevailed during the runup to the Civil War. In an address to the House in early 1868, Ross argued against H.R. Bill No. 439, which was additional and supplemental to "An act to provide for the more efficient Government of the Rebel States", the title of the initial legislation of the Reconstruction Acts. Ross argued that the U.S. Government had no constitutional right to impose military rule on the southern states that had participated in the Confederacy. Much of Ross' allotted time during the 1868 speech was taken up by a sometimes heated and ad hominem exchange with fellow Illinois Congressman Elihu B. Washburne of Illinois, a leading member of the Radical Republicans.

== Later life ==
Although he was considered by some individuals as a possible candidate for the office of Vice President of the United States in 1868, Ross retired from politics after his service as a congressman in order to manage his considerable real estate holdings in Lewistown and Havana and to pursue his business interests. In 1878, Ross was involved in the incorporation of the Fulton County Narrow-Gauge Railroad Company, which ultimately built a line between Galesburg and West Havana, Illinois. In 1893, Ross was elected President of the Lewistown National Bank, and he took an active role in the bank's affairs until his death.

== Death and legacy ==
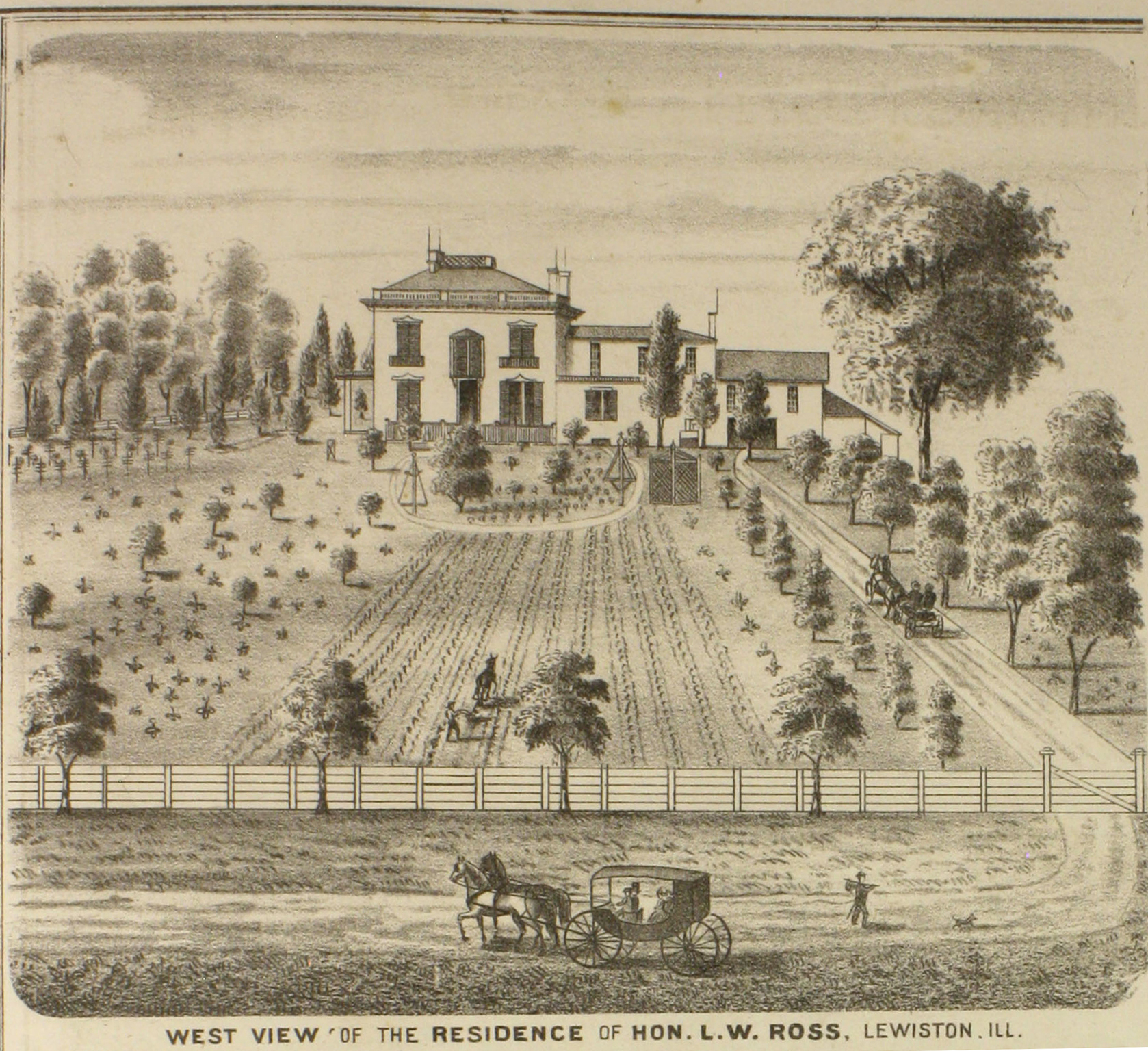

Lewis Ross died in Lewistown, Illinois, on October 29, 1895, as a consequence of a burst blood vessel in his head. He was interred in Oak Hill Cemetery in an area devoted to several members of the Ross family, including his grandmother (Abigail Lee Ross), his father, mother, wife, and 9 of his 12 children.

Original correspondence and other documents related to Lewis Ross are housed in the Abraham Lincoln Presidential Library in Springfield, Illinois, including letters exchanged between Ross and Stephen A. Douglas, letters from Ross to his wife during the Mexican–American War, an account book for general stores in Lewistown and Havana run by Lewis Ross and his sons, and an account book listing his real estate and personal property.

Ross was the basis for the character of Washington McNeely in Edgar Lee Masters' Spoon River Anthology. Two of Ross' sons provided the basis for other characters in that work. The suicide of Ross' son Ossian Reuben Ross is alluded to in Masters' depiction of the character of Harry McNeely, Washington McNeely's son; Lewis Cass Ross was the basis for the character of Lucious Atherton in another part of the work. However, none of Ross' other children bear any obvious relationship to the offspring of the Washington McNeely character. The "great mansion-house" mentioned in the verse refers to the Ross Mansion, a New England style building modeled after a mansion on the Hudson River that Ross admired. The mansion was demolished in 1962, and the land was designated by the City of Lewistown as Ross Mansion Park, which is located at the corner of Broadway Street and Milton Avenue.

== Notes ==
U.S. House of Representatives
Preceded by William J. Allen	Member of the U.S. House of Representatives from Illinois's 9th congressional district 1863 – 1869	Succeeded by Thompson W. McNeely
