= William S. Jewell =

American politician (1867–1956)

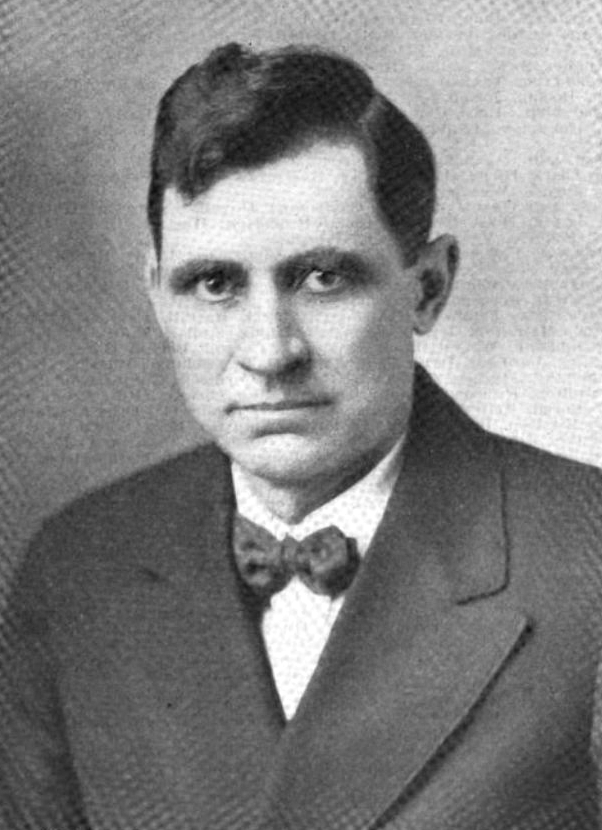

Member of the Illinois Senate
- In office 1914–1930

Personal details
- Born: William Sherman Jewell; May 12, 1867 Logan County, Illinois, US
- Died: January 29, 1956 (aged 88) Peoria, Illinois, US
- Party: Republican
- Spouse: Bernice Harwood
- Children: 6
- Occupation: Lawyer, politician

William Sherman Jewell (May 12, 1867 – January 29, 1956) was an American politician and lawyer.

== Biography ==
Jewell was born in Logan County, Illinois, the son of Julia Smith and John F. Jewell, a Civil War veteran who participated in General William Tecumseh Sherman's March to the Sea. Jewell was admitted to the Illinois bar in 1898. He practiced law in Lewistown, Illinois and served as the Lewistown city attorney. Jewell also served as the state's attorney for Fulton County, Illinois and was a Republican. He served in the Illinois Senate from 1915 until 1930. Jewell served as president pro tempore of the senate. Jewell died at a hospital in Peoria, Illinois.

== Personal life ==
Jewell was married to Bernice Harwood. They had six children: William S. Jr., Ida, Josephine, Elizabeth, Clara and Minnie.
