= Fulton Democrat =

Newspaper in Fulton County, Illinois

- Type: Weekly newspaper
- Founder: James Monroe Davidson
- Editor: John Froehling
- Founded: July 1855
- Headquarters: 31 S. Main Street Canton, IL 61520
- OCLC number: 28819102
- Website: democratnewspapers.com

The Fulton Democrat is a newspaper in Fulton County, Illinois. It was founded in July 1855 by James Monroe Davidson.

In 1860, William Taylor Davidson (1837-1915) was the sole owner and editor.
