= Lewistown, Illinois =

City in Fulton County, Illinois

- City
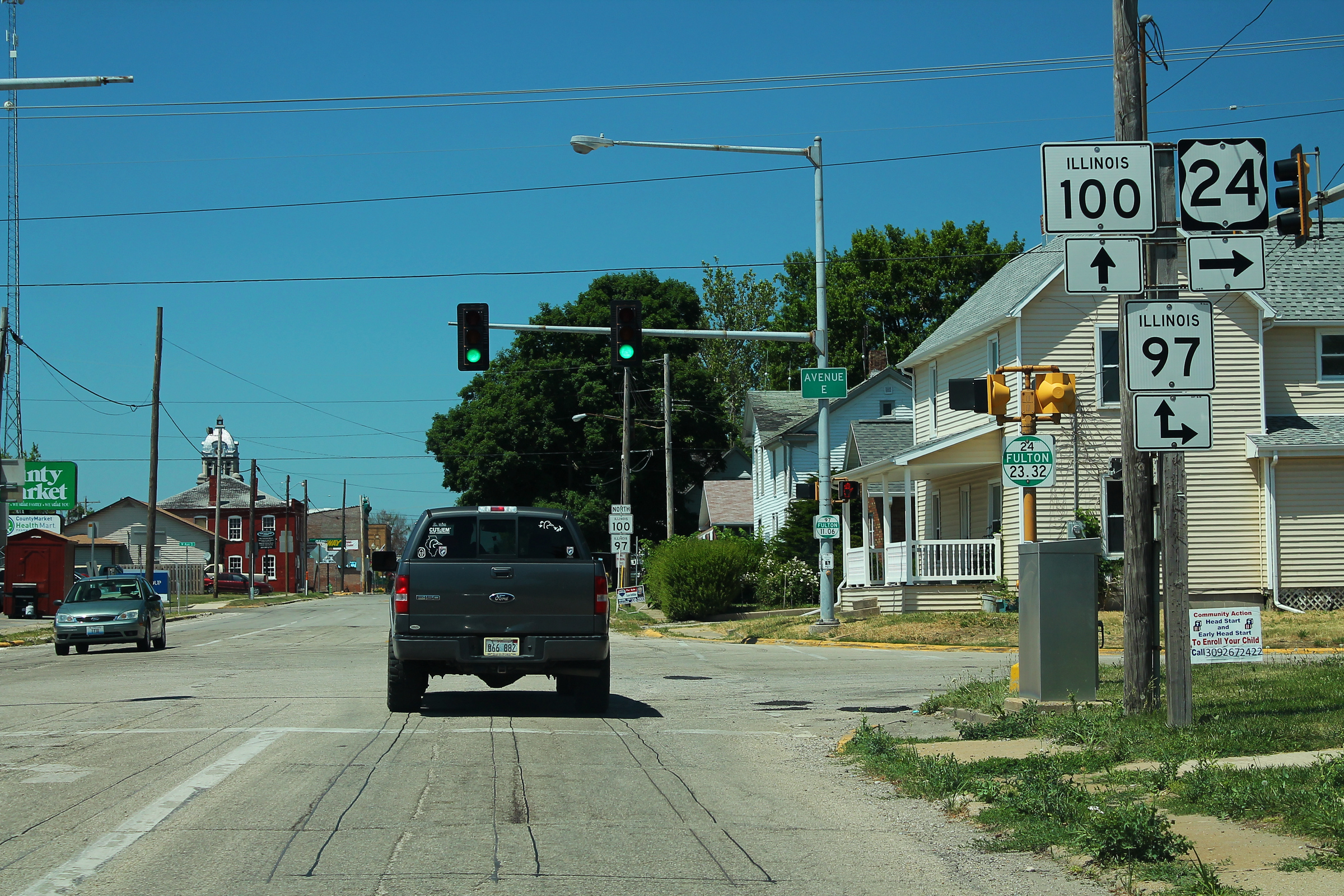
- Intersection of US 24, IL 97, and IL 100 in downtown Lewistown
- Interactive map of Lewistown, Illinois
- Location within Illinois Location within the United States
- Coordinates: 40°23′49″N 90°09′20″W
- Country: United States
- State: Illinois
- County: Fulton
- Township: Lewistown
- Founded: 1823 as Fulton Courthouse
- Renamed: 1831 as Lewistown
- Founder: Ossian M. Ross
- Named for: Lewis Winans Ross

Government
  - Mayor: Cindy Goddard

Area
  - Total: 2.00 sq mi (5.18 km^{2})
  - Land: 2.00 sq mi (5.18 km^{2})
  - Water: 0 sq mi (0.00 km^{2})
- Elevation: 591 ft (180 m)

Population (2020)
  - Total: 2,041
  - Estimate (2024): 1,960
  - Density: 1,020.4/sq mi (393.98/km^{2})
- Time zone: UTC-6 (CST)
  - Summer (DST): UTC-5 (CDT)
- ZIP Code(s): 61542
- Area code: 309
- FIPS code: 17-43055
- GNIS ID: 2395693
- Wikimedia Commons: Lewistown, Illinois
- Website: lewistownillinois.org

Lewistown is a city and the county seat of Fulton County, Illinois, United States. It was named by its founder, Ossian M. Ross, after his oldest son, Lewis Winans Ross. The population was 2,041 at the 2020 census. Located in central Illinois, it is southwest of Peoria. It is the source of Spoon River Anthology by Edgar Lee Masters, who lived there. Native American burial mounds are nearby at Dickson Mounds off Illinois Route 97.

== History ==
The city was named for Lewis Winans Ross, the son of its first settler, Ossian M. Ross. Originally named Fulton Courthouse with the establishment of its post office in 1824, it was renamed to Lewistown on March 14, 1831. It contains a tempera on canvas mural titled Lewistown Milestones, painted by Ida Abelman in 1941, depicting the Lincoln–Douglas debates. Murals were produced from 1934 to 1943 in the United States through the Section of Painting and Sculpture, later called the Section of Fine Arts, of the U.S. Treasury Department.

== Geography ==
Lewistown is located in central Fulton County. U.S. Route 24 passes through the center of the city, leading northeast 40 miles (64 km) to Peoria and southwest 89 miles (143 km) to Quincy. Illinois Route 97 leads north from Lewistown 48 miles (77 km) to Galesburg. IL 97 leads east out of Lewistown concurrently with US 24, then turns south, leading 12 miles (19 km) to Havana and 60 miles (97 km) to Springfield, the state capital.

According to the 2021 census gazetteer files, Lewistown has a total area of 2.00 square miles (5.18 km^{2}), all land.

=== Tourist attractions ===
Oak Hill Cemetery is located in Lewistown. This cemetery was made famous by Edgar Lee Masters in his Spoon River Anthology.

The Emiquon National Wildlife Refuge, a 7,000 acres (30 km^{2}) wetland restoration, is located on the Illinois River 6 miles (10 km) east of Lewistown. It is one of the largest floodplain restoration projects in the United States outside the Florida Everglades.

Dickson Mounds Museum, 5 miles (8 km) southeast of Lewistown, is an archaeological museum dedicated to American Indian artifacts. The building itself is built on ancient Native American burial mounds.

The Rasmussen Blacksmith Shop Museum is located on Main Street of Lewistown. It is one of the few blacksmith shops left in the United States. It has been run by the Rasmussen family since 1880.

The first Fulton County Courthouse was constructed in Lewistown in 1823. The current iteration of the building was built in 1898.

The Spoon River Valley Scenic Drive is an event sponsored by the city of Lewistown in the fall of each year. Lewistown Music in the Park is held in the city as well, with the festival earning the "Governor's Hometown Award" in 2021.

== Demographics ==
Historical population
Census	Pop.	Note	%±
1880	1,771		—
1890	2,166		22.3%
1900	2,504		15.6%
1910	2,312		−7.7%
1920	2,279		−1.4%
1930	2,249		−1.3%
1940	2,355		4.7%
1950	2,630		11.7%
1960	2,603		−1.0%
1970	2,706		4.0%
1980	2,758		1.9%
1990	2,572		−6.7%
2000	2,522		−1.9%
2010	2,384		−5.5%
2020	2,041		−14.4%
U.S. Decennial Census

=== 2020 census ===
As of the 2020 census, there were 2,041 people, 954 households, and 516 families residing in the city. The population density was 1,020.50 inhabitants per square mile (394.02/km^{2}), and there were 1,126 housing units at an average density of 563.00 per square mile (217.38/km^{2}).

The median age was 44.8 years. 20.4% of residents were under the age of 18 and 22.2% of residents were 65 years of age or older. For every 100 females there were 92.7 males, and for every 100 females age 18 and over there were 93.7 males age 18 and over.

0.0% of residents lived in urban areas, while 100.0% lived in rural areas.

There were 954 households, of which 24.3% had children under the age of 18 living in them. Of all households, 38.7% were married-couple households, 21.8% were households with a male householder and no spouse or partner present, and 31.2% were households with a female householder and no spouse or partner present. About 39.1% of all households were made up of individuals and 19.7% had someone living alone who was 65 years of age or older.

There were 1,126 housing units, of which 15.3% were vacant. The homeowner vacancy rate was 5.1% and the rental vacancy rate was 13.7%.

Racial composition as of the 2020 census
Race	Number	Percent
White	1,944	95.2%
Black or African American	7	0.3%
American Indian and Alaska Native	3	0.1%
Asian	1	0.0%
Native Hawaiian and Other Pacific Islander	1	0.0%
Some other race	17	0.8%
Two or more races	68	3.3%
Hispanic or Latino (of any race)	22	1.1%

=== Income and poverty ===
The median income for a household in the city was $52,393, and the median income for a family was $73,077. Males had a median income of $50,063 versus $26,156 for females. The per capita income for the city was $27,272. About 13.2% of families and 22.0% of the population were below the poverty line, including 30.0% of those under age 18 and 13.0% of those age 65 or over.

== Notable people ==
- Thomas A. Boyd, congressman from Illinois, 1877–1881
- Tony Butkovich, graduated from Lewistown High School; football fullback for Illinois & Purdue; killed in action in Okinawa
- Reed F. Cutler, Illinois legislator and lawyer, practiced law in Lewistown
- Jack Depler, professional football player and coach; born in Lewistown
- William S. Jewell, Illinois legislator and lawyer
- Lloyd Loar, Gibson sound engineer and master luthier in the early part of the 20th century; graduated from Lewistown High School in 1903
- Edgar Lee Masters, poet, writer, lawyer
- John Wesley Ross, Washington, D.C., attorney and politician; Illinois state representative; born in Lewistown
- Leonard F. Ross, brigadier general in the American Civil War; born in Lewistown
- Lewis Winans Ross, Illinois attorney, merchant, and U.S. congressman from Illinois' 9th district, 1863–1869; namesake of Lewiston
- Ossian M. Ross, major in the War of 1812; founder of Lewistown
- Isaac Newton Walker, a pioneer farmer and merchant
- Lila Acheson Wallace, co-founder of Reader's Digest; attended high school in Lewistown
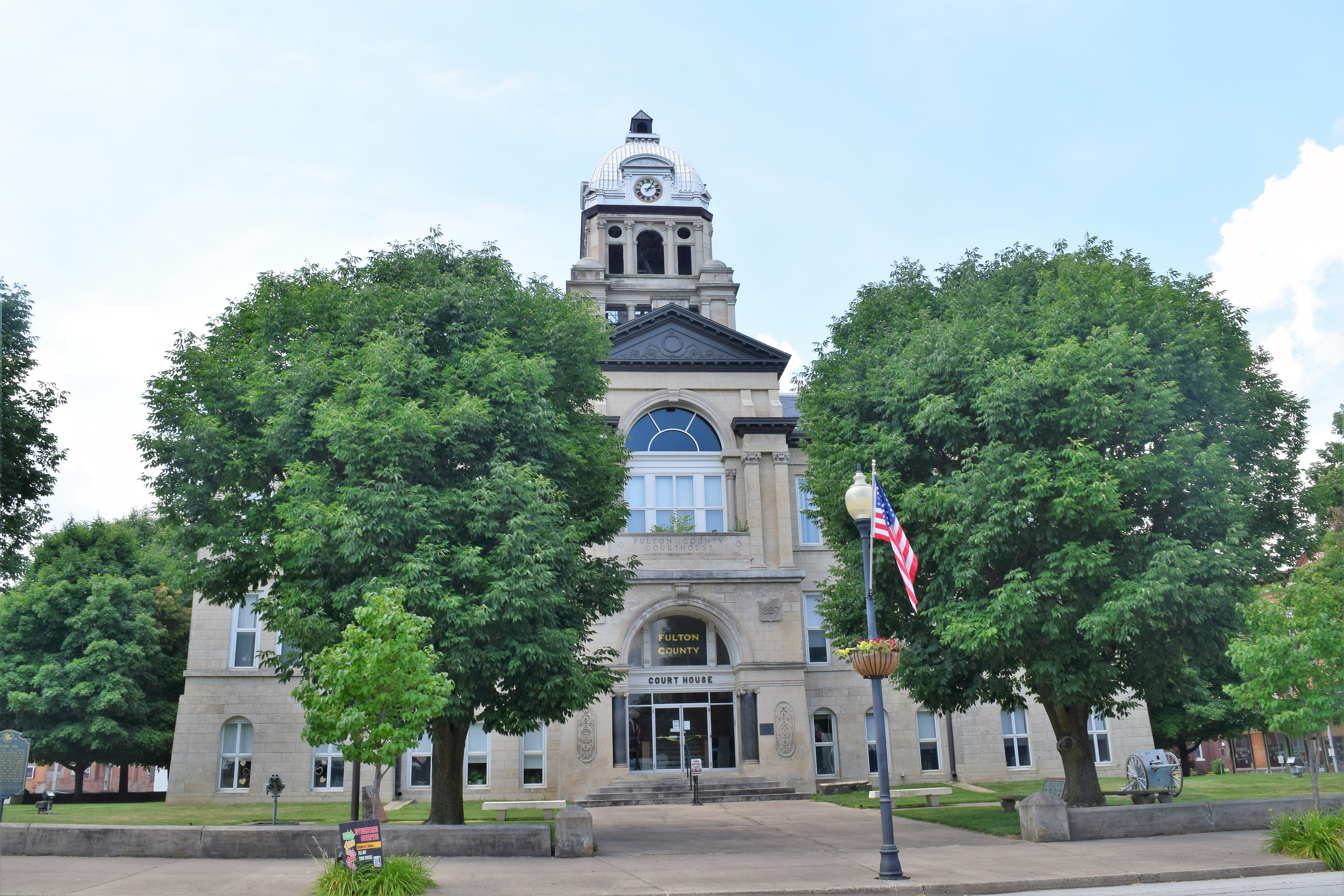
- Fulton County courthouse in downtown Lewistown, Illinois
  Barbara Woodell, actress; born in Lewistown
