= Leonard Fulton Ross =

American judge (1823–1901)

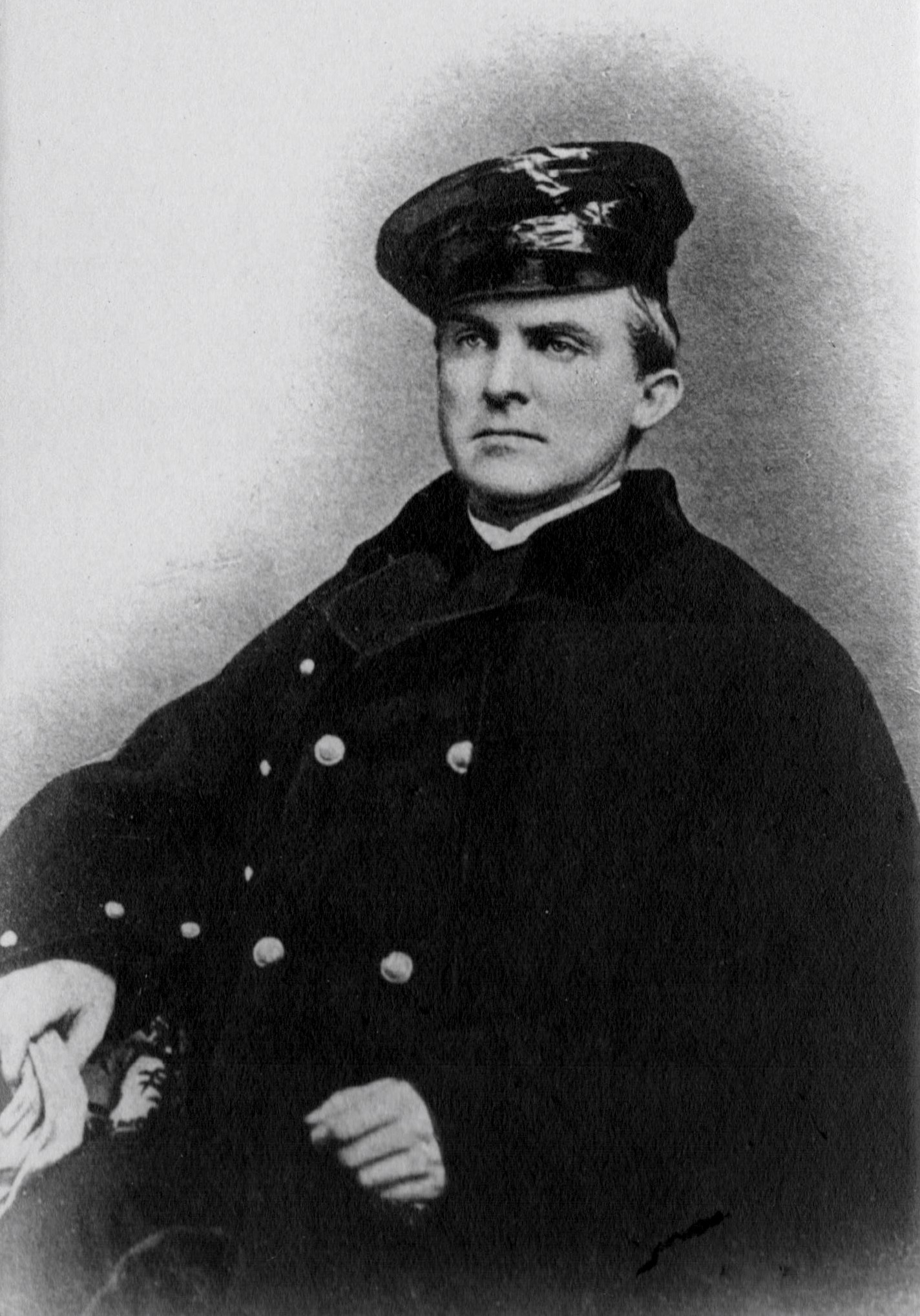
- Born: July 18, 1823; Lewistown, Illinois, US
- Died: January 17, 1901 (aged 77); Galesburg, Illinois, US
- Spouse(s): Catharine Mary Simms; Mary Elizabeth Warren
- Military career
- Allegiance: United States; Union
- Branch: United States Army; Union Army
- Service years: 1846–1847 (Mexican-American War); 1861–1863 (American Civil War)
- Rank: Brigadier General
- Commands: 17th Illinois Volunteer Infantry Regiment
- Conflicts: Mexican–American War: Battle of Veracruz; Battle of Cerro Gordo; American Civil War: Battle of Fredericktown; Battle of Fort Henry; Battle of Fort Donelson; Siege of Corinth; Yazoo Pass Expedition
- Other work: Lawyer, judge, stock raiser

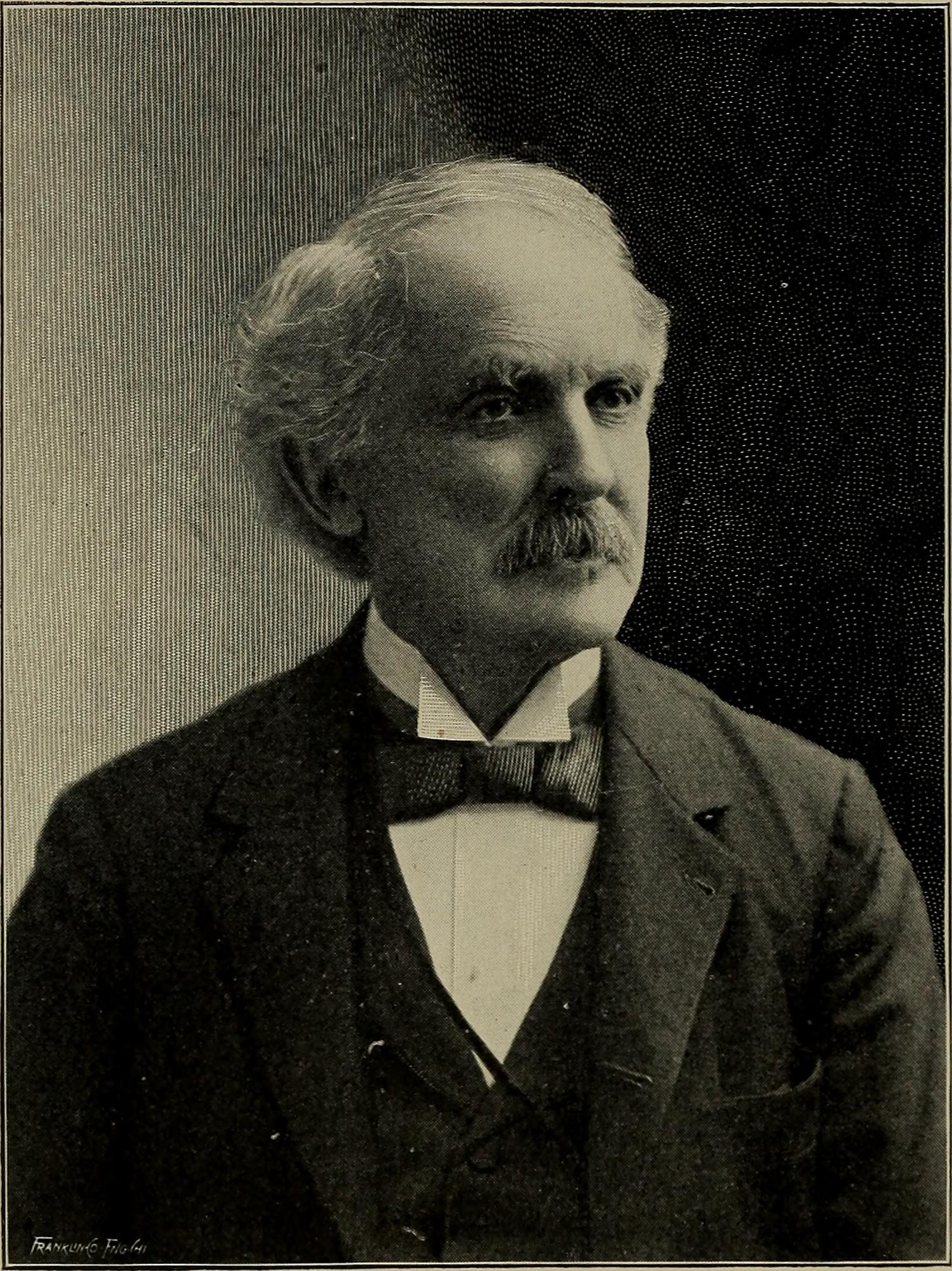
Leonard F. Ross

Leonard Fulton Ross (July 18, 1823 – January 17, 1901) was an American lawyer, probate judge, and stock raiser who served as a first lieutenant in the Mexican-American War and as a brigadier general during the American Civil War.

== Early life and education ==
Leonard F. Ross, third son and fifth child of Ossian M. Ross and Mary Winans, was born in Lewistown, Illinois, on July 7, 1823. (Note: Ross' grave marker gives his birth year as 1822, but United States census records, historical accounts, and a passport application signed by Leonard Ross and dated 1898 all state that his birth year was 1823.) Ross moved to Havana, Illinois, with his family at a young age, and for most of his youth, he received little formal schooling. Instead, he served as a clerk in his father's store and helped run his father's ferry service. Following his father's death in 1837, however, Leonard moved with his mother to Canton, Illinois, where he received college preparation from students of Illinois College. Ross attended Illinois College for one year (1841-1842), although his graduation date is listed as 1845 in school records. He then traveled through parts of neighboring states attempting to collect moneys due the estate of his father. In this endeavor, he was only partially successful, owing to the aftermath of the financial crash of 1837. Ross subsequently studied law in the office of Davidson and Kellogg of Canton, Illinois, and was admitted to the bar in December 1844. He then opened a law office in Vermont, Illinois, and practiced law until he enlisted in the Mexican–American War.

== Marriage and children ==
On November 13, 1845, Leonard Ross married Catharine Mary "Kitty" Simms, a sister of Frances M. Simms, who was married to Leonard’s brother, Lewis Winans Ross. Leonard and Catharine Ross had seven children: Leonard W. (1847-1864); Joseph H. (1849-1908); Mary (1852-1856); Ralph L. (1853-1856); Charles H. (1856-1924); Emma B. (1859-1875); and Adele (1861-1930). Catharine Ross died on March 10, 1862, while her husband was engaged in the American Civil War. On January 10, 1865, Ross married Mary Elizabeth Warren and four children resulted from that marriage: Cora (1865-1928); Frank F. (1867-1936); Willis W. (1869-1948); and Ossian M. (1874-1956).

== Military service ==
During the Mexican–American War, Leonard Ross volunteered in the 4th Illinois Volunteer Infantry Regiment, enlisting in June 1846. He was promoted from the rank of private to first lieutenant on September 4, 1846, by the commanding officer, Captain Lewis Winans Ross, his older brother. In a letter to his wife, Captain Ross remarked that Leonard "enjoys his honors very well & will make a very good officer. He lacks dignaty [sic] which I am imparting to him as fast as possible from the surplus which I had of the article on hand." Leonard Ross subsequently played prominent roles in a number of battles, including the Siege of Veracruz and the Battle of Cerro Gordo. According to a note on a muster roll signed by Captain Ross and dated April 30, 1847, Lieutenant Ross had sent in his resignation by that date and had already returned home from the war. However, it was also noted by Captain Ross that Lieutenant Ross' resignation was not accepted, so he was officially considered absent without leave, although there were apparently no adverse consequences. An extensive account of Leonard Ross' service during the Mexican-American War has been provided by the State Historical Society of Iowa.

At the outbreak of the Civil War, Ross joined the 17th Illinois Regiment, enlisting on May 25, 1861. He was elected Colonel and fought in this capacity at the battles of Fredericktown, Fort Henry, and Fort Donelson. On the first day of fighting at Fort Donelson, Colonel William Ralls Morrison was wounded and Ross assumed command of the brigade, which he led for the remainder of the battle, participating in Lew Wallace's counterattack against the Confederate breakout attempt. Ross was absent from the Battle of Shiloh, having traveled to Lewistown, Illinois, on March 26, 1862, following news of the death of his wife. Returning to the war, Ross was promoted to brigadier general of volunteers on April 25, 1862.

Ross led his brigade during the siege of Corinth and for a while led the 1st Division of the Army of the Tennessee. After a variety of commands on garrison duty, General Ross was placed in command of the 13th Division of the XIII Corps. On December 25, 1862, in Holly Springs, Mississippi, Ross was arrested by Brigadier General Charles S. Hamilton for refusal to obey Hamilton's order to report by telegraph to Brigadier General Isaac F. Quinby for orders concerning Quinby's wagon train. In a subsequent court-martial, Ross was found guilty and was sentenced to a reprimand from General Ulysses S. Grant. General Grant stated that Ross "was deserving of the serious reprimand" but that he "was not wilfully [sic] guilty of conduct so prejudicial to the service, but acted under the impulse of the moment, and the belief that a wrong was being done to him." Based on Ross' service record, Grant then relieved him from his arrest and returned him to his command.

Ross was placed in charge of the Yazoo Pass expedition against the Confederate fortress of Fort Pemberton guarding Vicksburg from the north. Ross' expedition amounted to little more than an artillery duel against the fort before he decided to abandon the expedition. At roughly the same time, reinforcements under General Quinby arrived, and Quinby convinced Ross to renew the attack. Ross did so with few results and eventually withdrew. Ross resigned his commission on July 22, 1863, in order to look after his personal interests, believing that the war was nearly over. A detailed description of Ross' service during the Civil War was published by the Iowa State Historical Society,

== Political service ==
Upon his return from the Mexican-American War, Ross was elected probate judge of Fulton County, a position which he held from 1847 to 1849. He was then elected county clerk and served in this position for four years (1849-1853), during which time he was also engaged in buying and selling land, raising stock, and pursuing business interests. Ross was a delegate to the Democratic National Conventions of 1852 and 1856, working on behalf of Stephen A. Douglas. Following the Civil War, Ross served as a collector of internal revenue (1867-1869), having been appointed to this position by President Andrew Johnson. In 1868, Ross ran for Congress as a Republican but was defeated, owing in large part to the dominance of the Democrats in his district. He was a delegate to the Republican National Convention in 1872 that nominated President Ulysses S. Grant for a second term. Ross ran again for Congress in 1874, but this time as an independent candidate rather than as a Republican, in part because he was disgusted by the Star Route scandal. He was narrowly defeated by his Republican opponent, Richard H. Whiting, due in large part to the prominence of the Republican party in Illinois' 9th district at that time.

== Political views ==
Like his older brother Lewis, Leonard Ross was a strong supporter of Stephen A. Douglas. The younger Ross was a member of two Democratic National Conventions on Douglas' behalf and was the first Douglas Democrat to command a regiment of Illinois soldiers in the Civil War. However, unlike Lewis, who was a so-called Peace Democrat or Copperhead during the Civil War, Leonard was a volunteer in the Union Army and supported the war effort. Following the war, Leonard Ross joined the Republican Party and ran unsuccessfully for Congress as a Republican. Ross also supported all Republican candidates for president from Grant to McKinley. Nevertheless, Leonard Ross might more appropriately be considered a political independent, given that he did not adhere strictly to the doctrines of either party, and ran (although unsuccessfully) as an independent candidate for Congress.

== Later life ==
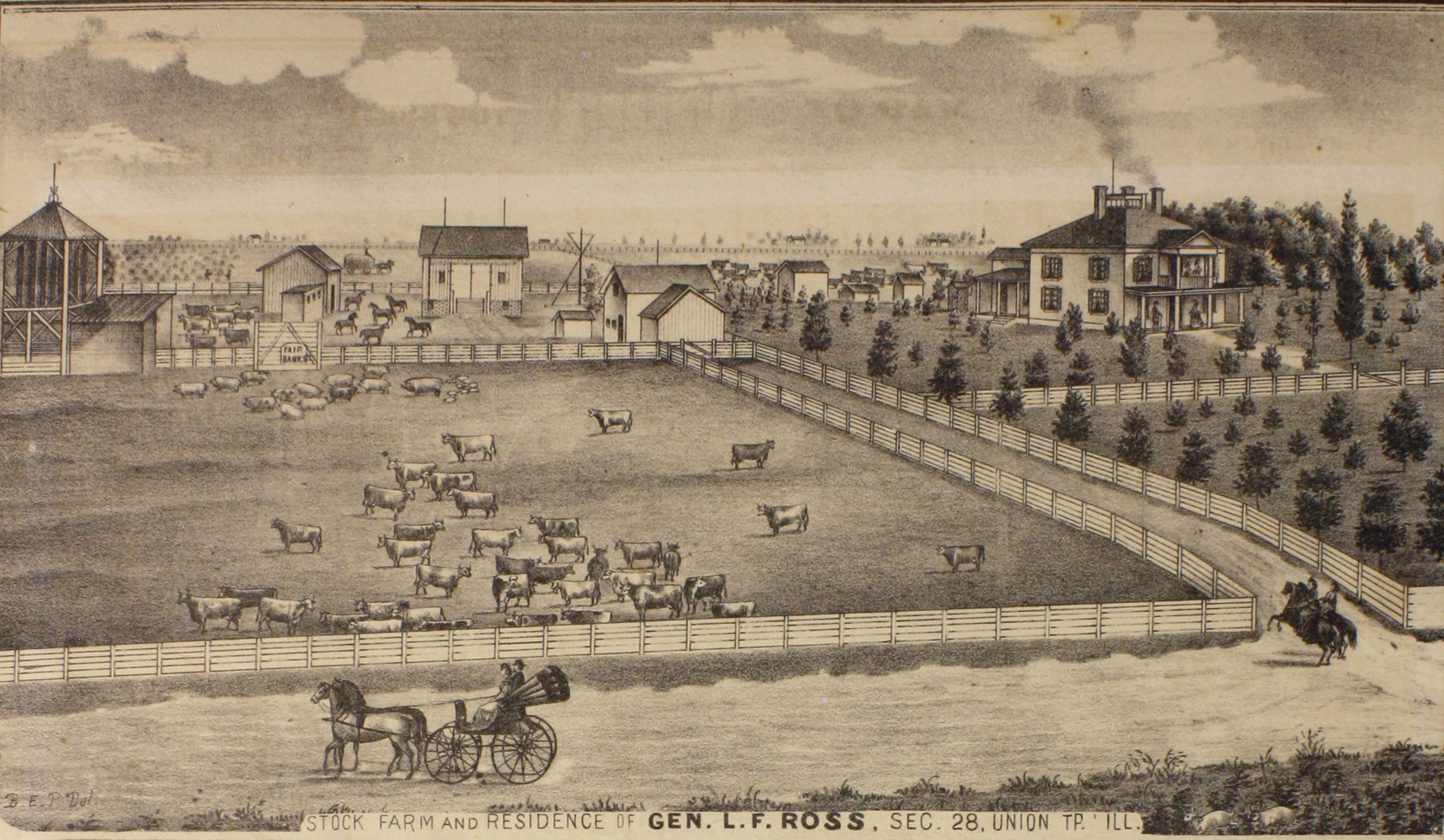
Stock farm and residence of General Ross near Avon, Illinois

In his later years, Ross devoted his attention to stock breeding and farming on his land near Avon, Illinois, raising several prize-winning cattle. He served as secretary and then president of the Fulton County Agricultural Society. Ross was also a Freemason and a member of Lewistown Lodge No. 104. In 1882, Ross moved to land near Iowa City, Iowa, a region that he had visited as a young man. Here he engaged in stock breeding and dairy farming, and served as president of the Red Polled Cattle Club of America and of the Johnson County Fine Stock Association. He also wrote two monographs about red polled cattle. Leonard Ross returned to Lewistown, Illinois, in 1894, where he joined his brother Lewis and others in organizing and managing the Lewistown National Bank. During the period from 1884 to 1898, Ross also traveled extensively, visiting England, Scotland, California, Oregon, Washington, Florida, Cuba, and Mexico.

== Death and legacy ==
Leonard F. Ross died of pneumonia in a sanitarium in Galesburg, Illinois, on January 17, 1901.

In the month prior to his death, Ross wrote a lengthy letter to his seven living children and his 16 grandchildren describing his philosophy of life and giving them advice as to how they should live theirs. Among his other recommendations, Ross extolled the virtue of work and advised the avoidance of tobacco usage. Ross also noted that "[w]hile it is believed that the 20th century is to be in the main peaceful and quiet, it will be well for all young men to gain a knowledge of the duties of a soldier."

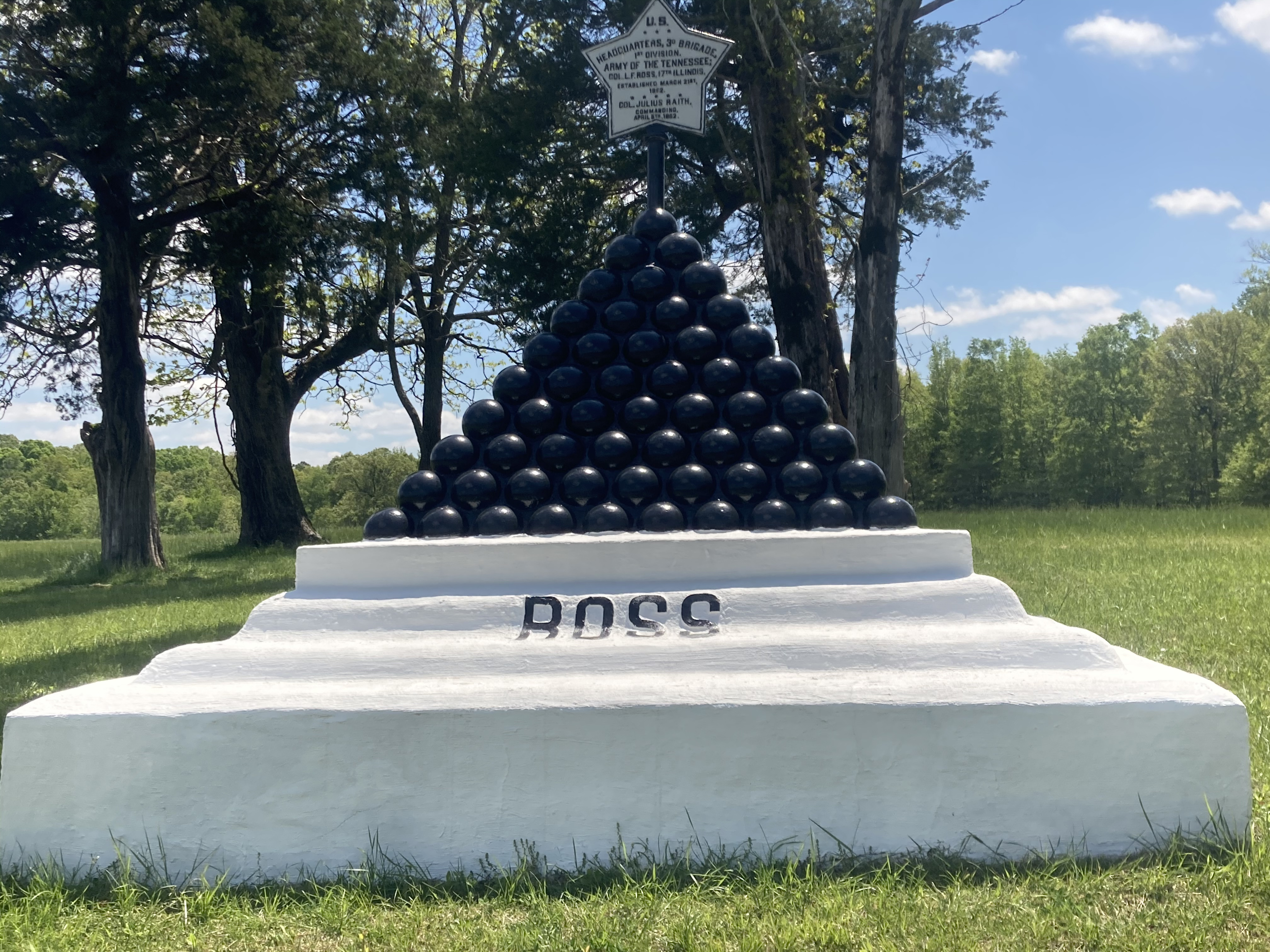
Memorial to Colonel Leonard Fulton Ross at Shiloh National Military Park

Leonard Ross' military service in the Civil War is commemorated by a monument located in Duncan Field, Shiloh National Military Park in Tennessee. Consisting of a pyramid of cannonballs on a base labeled "Ross," this monument marks the headquarters of the 3rd Brigade, 1st Division, Army of the Tennessee, which was commanded by Gen. Ross in 1862 and 1863.

Notable descendants of Leonard Ross include Frank F. Ross, son of Leonard and Mary, who received a Medal of Honor for his actions during the Philippine–American War, and Betty Ross Clarke, granddaughter of Leonard and Mary, who was an American stage and film actress. Original correspondence and other documents related to Leonard F. Ross are housed in the Abraham Lincoln Presidential Library in Springfield, Illinois. Also contained in that collection are documents pertaining to other members of the Ross family, including Leonard's father Ossian, his brother Lewis, and Lewis' son John Wesley Ross.

== See also ==
- List of American Civil War generals (Union)
