= Military Tract of 1812 =

The Military Tract of 1812 is the name of a region of the US territories in what later became western Illinois. Shortly before the War of 1812, the US Congress reserved the unorganized territory so that quarter-sections of land could be promised to men who enlisted to fight against the British. That encouraged both enlistment and later settlement although many soldiers eventually sold or traded their plots.

The Archives and Special Collections Unit at Western Illinois University Libraries has information on the history of the Illinois Military Tract.

== See also ==
- Central New York Military Tract
- Land grant

== See also ==
- Land grant

=== External links ===
- An Act to provide for designating, surveying and granting the Military Bounty Lands, Act of the 12th United States Congress, Session I, Chapter 77, May 6, 1812
- An Act to authorize the survey of two million acres (8,000 km²) of the public lands, in lieu of that quantity heretofore authorized to be surveyed, in the territory of Michigan, as military bounty lands, Act of the 14th United States Congress, Session I, Chapter 164, April 19, 1816
- Description of the military land in Michigan, report by surveyor-general Edward Tiffin, November 30, 1815, in Michigan As a Province, Territory and State, the Twenty-Sixth Member of the Federal Union Vol. 2, by Henry M. Utley and Clarence M. Cutcheon. pg. 254-255.
- The History of McDonough County, Illinois compiled by R. Chenoweth and S.W. Semonis, sponsored by the McDonough Co. Genealogical Society, 1992, Curtis Media Corporation, Dallas, TX.
- http://www.historyillinois.org/Markers/old_markers/224.htm Illinois State Historical Society, IL Military Tract, Henry County
- http://users.arn.net/~billco/uslpr4.htm
- MAXWELL v. MOORE, 63 U.S. Supreme Court 185 (1859)
- Black Hawk War
- Quincy Herald-Whig
- Western Illinois University Archives and Special Collections
