= Edgar Lee Masters =

American poet (1868–1950)

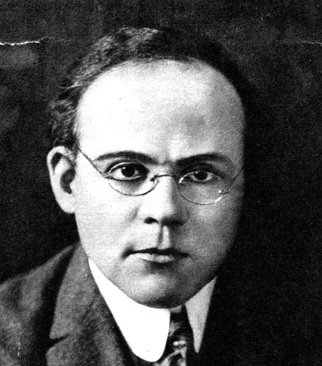
- Masters as a young man
- Born: August 23, 1868; Garnett, Kansas, U.S.
- Died: March 5, 1950 (aged 81); Melrose Park, Pennsylvania, U.S.
- Resting place: Oakland cemetery, Petersburg, Illinois
- Occupations: Poet; biographer; lawyer
- Writing career
- Language: English
- Notable awards: Robert Frost Medal (1942)

Edgar Lee Masters (August 23, 1868 – March 5, 1950) was an American attorney, poet, biographer, and dramatist. He is the author of Spoon River Anthology (1915), The New Star Chamber and Other Essays, Songs and Satires, The Great Valley, The Serpent in the Wilderness, An Obscure Tale, The Spleen, Mark Twain: A Portrait, Lincoln: The Man, and Illinois Poems. In all, Masters published twelve plays, twenty-one books of poetry, six novels and six biographies, including those of Abraham Lincoln, Mark Twain, Vachel Lindsay, and Walt Whitman.

== Life and career ==
Edgar Lee Masters was born on August 23, 1868, in Garnett, Kansas, to attorney Hardin Wallace Masters and Emma Jerusha Dexter. His father had briefly moved to set up a law practice, then soon moved back to his paternal grandparents' farm near Petersburg in Menard County, Illinois. In 1880 they moved to Lewistown, Illinois, where he attended high school and had his first publication in the Chicago Daily News. The culture around Lewistown, in addition to the town's cemetery at Oak Hill and the nearby Spoon River, were the inspirations for many of his works, most notably Spoon River Anthology, his most famous and acclaimed work.

He attended Knox Academy in 1889–1890, a now defunct preparatory program run by Knox College, but was forced to leave by his family's inability to finance his education.

After working in his father's law office, he was admitted to the Illinois bar and moved to Chicago, where he established a law partnership in 1893 with the law firm of Kickham Scanlan. He married twice. In 1898 he married Helen M. Jenkins, the daughter of Robert Edwin Jenkins, a lawyer in Chicago, and had three children. From 1903 to 1911, Masters was partners in the firm of Darrow, Masters and Wilson with Clarence Darrow, the famous trial lawyer, and Francis S. Wilson, who later served as Chief Justice of the Illinois Supreme Court. In 1911 he started his own law firm, despite three years of unrest (1908–1911) caused by extramarital affairs and an argument with Darrow.

Two of his children followed him with literary careers. His daughter Marcia Masters pursued poetry, while his son Hilary Masters became a novelist. Hilary and his half-brother Hardin wrote a memoir of their father.

Masters died in poverty at a nursing home on March 5, 1950, in Melrose Park, Pennsylvania, age 81. He is buried in Oakland cemetery in Petersburg, Illinois. His epitaph includes his poem, "To-morrow is My Birthday" from Toward the Gulf (1918):

Good friends, let's to the fields ...
After a little walk, and by your pardon,
I think I'll sleep. There is no sweeter thing,
Nor fate more blessed than to sleep.

I am a dream out of a blessed sleep –
Let's walk, and hear the lark.

=== Family history ===
Edgar's father was Hardin Wallace Masters, whose father was Squire Davis Masters, whose father was Thomas Masters, whose father was Hillery Masters, the son of Robert Masters (born c. 1715, Prince George's County, Maryland, the son of William W. Masters and wife Mary Veatch Masters). Edgar Lee Masters wrote in his autobiography, Across Spoon River (1936), that his ancestor Hillery Masters was the son of "Knotteley" Masters, but family genealogies show that Hillery and Notley Masters were, in fact, brothers.

== Poetry ==
Masters first published his early poems and essays under the pseudonym Dexter Wallace (after his mother's maiden name and his father's middle name) until the year 1903, when he joined the law firm of Clarence Darrow. Masters began developing as a notable American poet in 1914, when he began a series of poems (this time under the pseudonym Webster Ford) about his childhood experiences in western Illinois, which appeared in Reedy's Mirror, a St. Louis publication.

In 1915 the series was bound into a volume and re-titled Spoon River Anthology. Years later, he wrote a memorable and invaluable account of the book's background and genesis, his working methods and influences, as well as its reception by the critics, favorable and hostile, in an autobiographical article notable for its human warmth and general interest.

Although he never matched the success of Spoon River Anthology, he published several other volumes of poems including Book of Verses in 1898, Songs and Sonnets in 1910, The Great Valley in 1916, Song and Satires in 1916, The Open Sea in 1921, The New Spoon River in 1924, Lee in 1926, Jack Kelso in 1928, Lichee Nuts in 1930, Gettysburg, Manila, Acoma in 1930, Godbey, sequel to Jack Kelso in 1931, The Serpent in the Wilderness in 1933, Richmond in 1934, Invisible Landscapes in 1935, The Golden Fleece of California in 1936, Poems of People in 1936, The New World in 1937, and More People in 1939. Two of his later volumes were published by the Decker Press after its founder, James Decker, asked Masters for permission to print his work; Masters agreed and Illinois Poems was published in 1941 and Along the Illinois was released in 1942.

== Notable works ==
=== Poetry ===
- A Book of Verses (1898)
- Songs and Sonnets (1910)
- Spoon River Anthology (1915)
- Songs and Satires (1916)
- The Great Valley (New York: Macmillan Co., 1916)
- Toward the Gulf (New York: Macmillan Co., 1918)
- Starved Rock (New York: Macmillan Co., 1919)
- Domesday Book (New York: Macmillan Co., 1920)
- The Open Sea (New York: Macmillan Co., 1921)
- The New Spoon River (New York: Macmillan Co., 1924)
- Selected Poems (1925)
- Lee: A Dramatic Poem (1926)
- Jack Kelso: A Dramatic Poem (1928)
- Lichee Nuts (1930)
- Godbey: A Dramatic Poem (1931), sequel to Jack Kelso (1920)
- The Serpent in the Wilderness (1933)
- Richmond: A Dramatic Poem (1934)
- Invisible Landscapes (1935)
- Poems of People (1936)
- The Golden Fleece of California (1936) (poetic narrative)
- The New World (1937)
- More People (1939)
- Illinois Poems (1941)
- Along the Illinois (1942)

=== Biographies ===
- Levy Mayer and the New Industrial Era (New Haven: Yale University Press, 1927). Chicago attorney Levy Mayer (1858–1922)
- Lincoln: The Man (1931)
- Vachel Lindsay: A Poet in America (1935)
- Across Spoon River: An Autobiography (memoir) (1939)
- Whitman (1937)
- Mark Twain: A Portrait (1938)

=== Books ===
- Maxmilian: A Drama (1902)
- The New Star Chamber and Other Essays (1904)
- The Blood of the Prophets (1905) (play)
- Althea (1907) (play)
- The Trifler (1908) (play)
- Mitch Miller (New York: The Macmillan Company, 1920) (novel)
- Children of the Market Place (New York: Macmillan Co., 1922) (novel)
- Skeeters Kirby (1923) (novel)
- The Nuptial Flight (1923) (novel)
- Mirage (1924)
- Kit O'Brien (1927) (novel)
- The Fate of the Jury: An Epilogue to Domesday Book (1929)
- Gettysburg, Manila, Acoma: Three Plays (1930)
- The Tale of Chicago (1933)
- The Tide of Time (1937) (novel)
- The Sangamon (Rivers of America Series, 1942), (Chicago: University of Illinois Press, 1988)

== Awards and honors ==
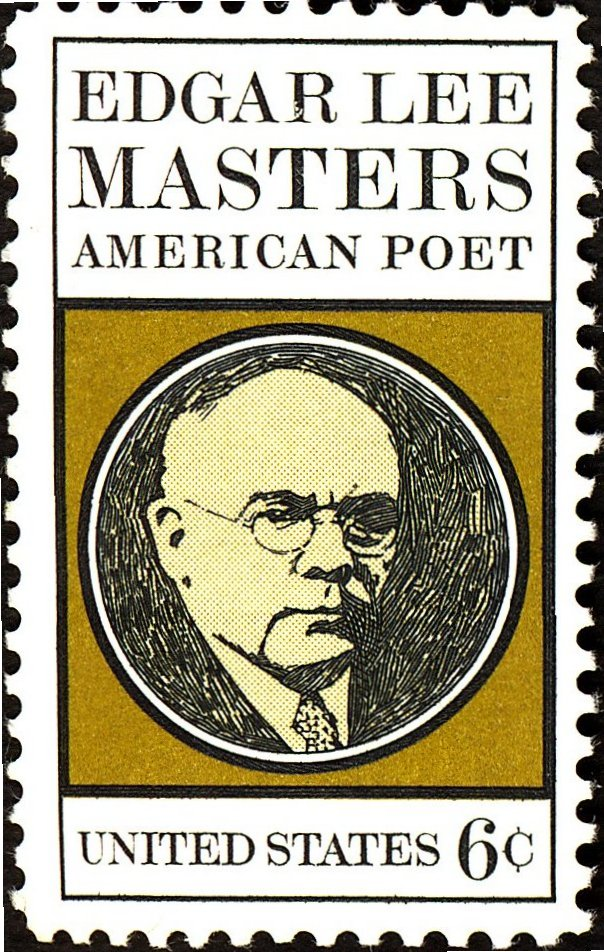
Postal stamp, issued August 22, 1970

Masters was awarded the Mark Twain Silver Medal in 1936, the Poetry Society of America medal in 1941, the Academy of American Poets Fellowship in 1942, and the Shelly Memorial Award in 1944. In 2014, he was inducted into the Chicago Literary Hall of Fame.
