= Interstate 74 in Illinois =

Highway in Illinois

Interstate 74
- Everett McKinley Dirksen Memorial Highway
- I-74 highlighted in red

Route information
- Maintained by IDOT
- Length: 220.34 mi (354.60 km)
- NHS: Entire route

Major junctions
- West end: I-74 / US 6 at Moline
- I-280 / US 6 in Moline; I-80 / I-280 / IL 110 (CKC) in Colona; US 34 / IL 110 (CKC) in Galesburg; I-474 in Peoria; I-474 in East Peoria; I-155 near Morton; I-55 / US 51 in Bloomington; I-57 in Champaign; US 150 / IL 1 in Danville
- East end: I-74 at Danville

Location
- Country: United States
- State: Illinois
- Counties: Rock Island, Henry, Knox, Peoria, Tazewell, Woodford, McLean, DeWitt, Piatt, Champaign, Vermilion

Highway system
- Interstate Highway System; Main; Auxiliary; Suffixed; Business; Future; Illinois State Highway System; Interstate; US; State; Tollways; Scenic
← IL 73	→ IL 75

Interstate 74 (I-74) in the US state of Illinois is a major northwest–southeast Interstate Highway that runs across the central portion of the state. It runs from the Iowa state line at the Mississippi River near the city of Rock Island and runs southeast to the Indiana state line east of Danville, a distance of 220.34 miles (354.60 km). The highway runs through the major cities of Moline, Peoria, Bloomington, and Champaign.

The highway is officially named after Everett McKinley Dirksen, a Republican representative and senator from Pekin from 1933 to his death in 1969.

== Route description ==
I-74 in Illinois runs parallel with U.S. Route 6 (US 6) in the Quad Cities, US 150 from the Quad Cities to Danville, and US 136 east of Danville.

=== Iowa state line to Bloomington–Normal ===
After crossing the Iowa state line and the Mississippi River via the I-74 Bridge (through arch span), I-74, as well as US 6, enters the city of Moline. At first, the freeway travels southward, meeting River Drive, Illinois Route 92 (IL 92, 6th Avenue), 7th Avenue, Avenue of the Cities, and IL 5 (John Deere Road), before reaching I-280. Near the Quad Cities International Airport, I-74 turns eastward along I-280 while US 6 continues south for a short distance. Southeast of Colona, I-280 ends at the Big X interchange while I-74 turns southward via ramps. This interchange is also where I-80 turns east via ramps. At this point, I-74 runs along IL 110 all the way to Galesburg. Along the way, the freeway comes across IL 81 and IL 17 before meeting US 34. At this point, IL 110 travels west along US 34 while I-74 continues south.

East of Galesburg, I-74 begins to curve southeastward. Along the way, it meets US 150 in Knoxville, local roads near Brimfield, and one near Kickapoo before meeting I-474/IL 6. I-474 serves as a southern bypass of Peoria. Along the way through Peoria, it comes across Sterling Avenue, then US 150, Gale Avenue, University Street, IL 40, IL 29 (where they become concurrent), and the Murray Baker Bridge. East of Peoria, the freeway then meets IL 40 (Riverfront Drive), US 24/US 150/IL 29 (where IL 29 leaves the concurrency)/IL 116, US 150/IL 8, and Pinecrest Drive, before meeting I-474 again. After the I-474 interchange, it then meets the I-155 interchange, as well as Morton Avenue, in Morton. The freeway then meets IL 117 in Goodfield, a local road near Carlock, and US 150 near Yuton. As it approaches Normal, I-74 then meets I-55/US 51 at a trumpet interchange, which then turns south.

=== Bloomington–Normal to Indiana state line ===
The concurrency then meets US 150 in Bloomington before I-55 branches southwestward at the I-55 Business (I-55 Bus.) interchange. After that, US 51 branches southward at US 51 Bus. I-74 then travels southeastward at this point. Along the way, it meets two local roads serving Downs and Le Roy, respectively; US 136; IL 54; another local road near Mansfield; IL 47; and another local road near Mahomet. As it approaches Champaign, it then comes across I-57, then Prospect Avenue, and then Neil Street. For Urbana, it serves Lincoln Avenue, US 45, and IL 130. After leaving the city of Urbana, it then serves two local roads for St. Joseph and Ogden, IL 49, another local road for Oakwood, and US 150. At this point, I-74 becomes a freeway bypass of Danville. In Tilton, it serves G Street as well as US 150/IL 1. After crossing the Vermilion River, it then meets Bowman Road and Lynch Road. Shortly after the Lynch Road interchange, I-74 crosses the Indiana state line.

== History ==
Construction of original road began in 1956, with the first portion opened by 1958. South of Moline, the bridges over the Rock River were completed some years before they were opened to traffic. They were finally put into service on October 7, 1964, when a temporary terminus on 27th Street was opened. The section of Interstate 74 from there through Moline was opened on December 10, 1975.

The Murray Baker Bridge was repaired in 1984.

In 1990 and 1991, as part of a proposed rerouting of I-80 onto I-280, there were plans to extend I-74. IDOT listed safety concerns and cost savings as the reasons to do so. Iowa officials challenged the reroute, causing the routes of I-74 and I-80 never changed.

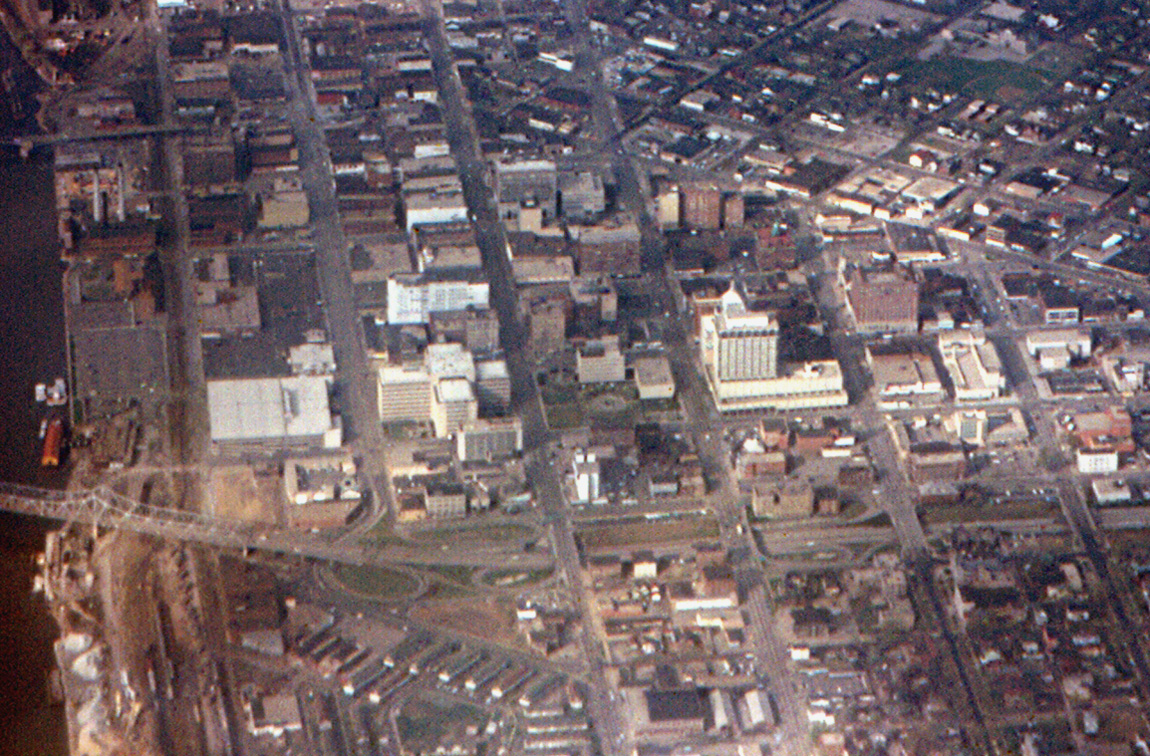
Original ramp configurations in Peoria, prior to Upgrade 74 project

In November 2006, major work was completed on the Upgrade 74 project for the portion of I-74 in the Midwest. This multiyear project, begun in April 2002, saw the complete renovation of I-74 through East Peoria and Peoria. Most notably, the Interstate was widened to three lanes through the cities, many blind or hairpin exits and entrances to the highway were removed or corrected, and many bridges crossing the highway were replaced. The biggest part of this project was to work on the Murray Baker Bridge, over which I-74 crosses the Illinois River. The bridge was completely closed to traffic while being partially demolished and reconstructed from April 2 to October 15, 2005. During this time, I-74 was disconnected between Peoria and East Peoria.

With designation of the Chicago Kansas City Expressway in May 2010, a portion of I-74 became concurrent with it.

In July 2014, a portion of the road was named for Ray LaHood.

In late March 2013, a complete $86.6-million (equivalent to $129 million in 2024) reconstruction of the Morton I-74/I-155 interchange, started its beginning phases (Morton, a hub for the two Interstates and the site of facilities for Caterpillar Inc., PepsiCo, and Libby's, is a growing Peoria suburb, across the Illinois River, east of East Peoria and Pekin, in Tazewell County). This latest project was scheduled to be finished by mid-2016, and the reconstruction was being scheduled in phases to minimize traffic disruption.

In 2020, the Murray Baker Bridge was closed for seven months for a $42.2-million project. At the end of October, it reopened with new decorative lighting, a new deck, and traffic signals.

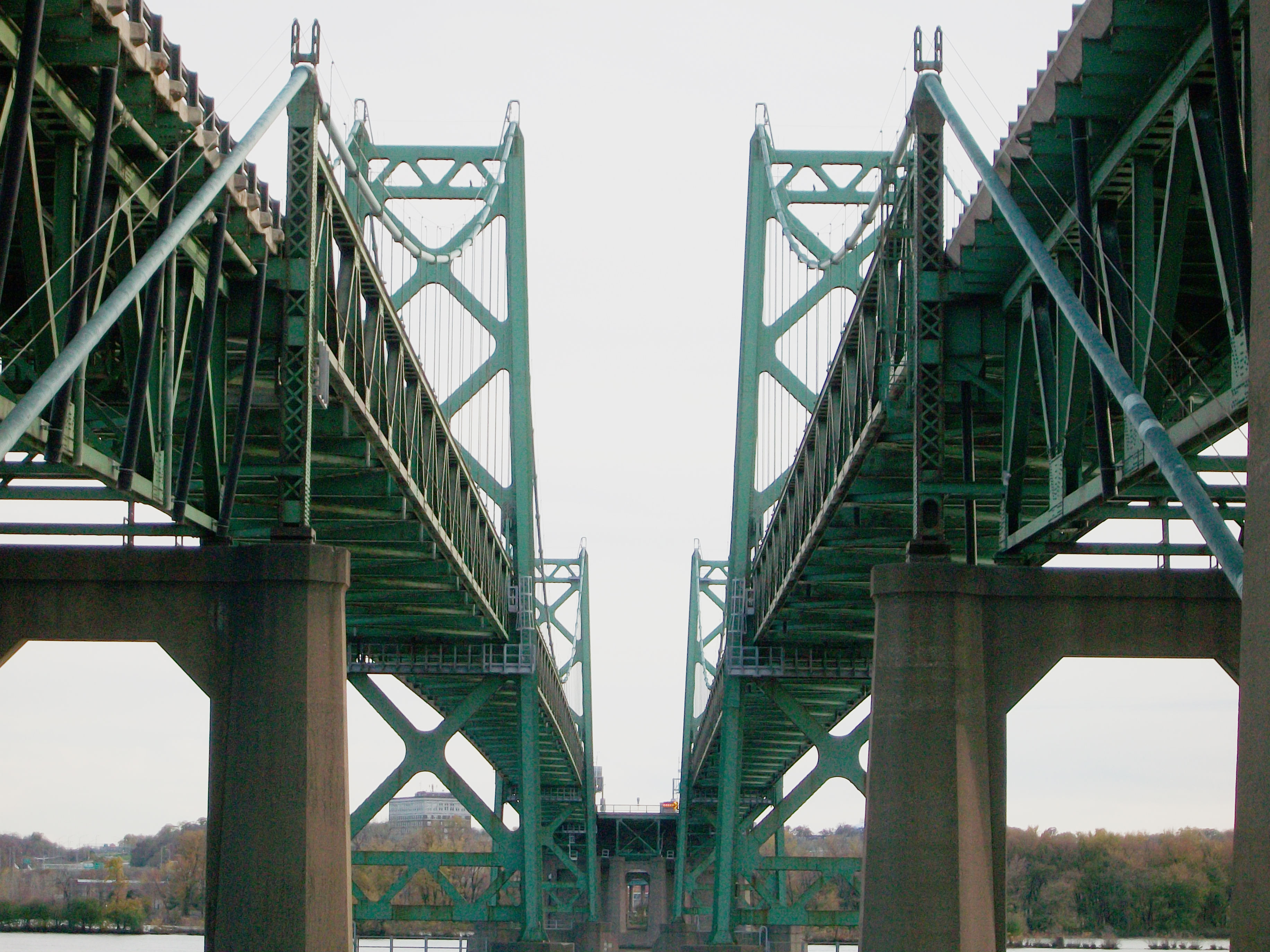
I-74 once began on the old I-74 Bridge over the Mississippi River at Moline

The Iowa Department of Transportation (Iowa DOT) and Illinois Department of Transportation (IDOT) planned to build a new bridge to replace the obsolete I-74 Bridges. The Iowa-bound bridge opened in 1935; the Illinois-bound bridge in 1959. In addition to replacing the twin bridges, the scope of the bistate coalition's plan includes updating seven miles (11 km) of I-74 mainline and interchanges from 53rd Street in Davenport to the Avenue of the Cities in Moline. The new twin span fully opened on December 1, 2021.

== Exit list ==
County	Location	mi	km	Exit	Destinations	Notes
Mississippi River		0.00	0.00		I-74 west / US 6 west – Davenport	Continuation into Iowa
Mississippi River		0.00	0.00	I-74 Bridge		
Rock Island	Moline	0.64	1.03	1A	To IL 92 / River Drive / 3rd Avenue	Eastbound exit and westbound entrance only
Rock Island	Moline	0.94– 1.17	1.51– 1.88	1B (EB) 2 (WB)	IL 92 east (6th Avenue) To IL 92 / 7th Avenue	
Rock Island	Moline	2.09	3.36	3	Avenue of the Cities	
Rock Island	Moline	3.59	5.78	4	IL 5 (John Deere Road) to I-88	Signed as exits 4A (west) and 4B (east)
Rock Island	Moline	4.51	7.26	5	I-280 west – Des Moines, Rock Island US 6 east to US 150 – Quad City Airport	Eastern end of US 6 concurrency; western end of I-280 concurrency; signed as exits 5A (I-280 west) eastbound and 5B (US 6 east) westbound; I-280 east exit 18B
Henry	Colona Township	13.89	22.35	—	I-80 / IL 110 (CKC) east to I-88 – Chicago, Des Moines, Davenport I-280 ends	Big X; eastern terminus of I-280; western end of IL 110/CKC concurrency
Henry	Lynn Township	23.92	38.50	24	IL 81 – Andover, Cambridge	
Henry	Woodhull	31.89	51.32	32	IL 17 – Woodhull, Alpha	
Knox	Galesburg	45.50	73.23	46A	US 34 west / IL 110 (CKC) west – Monmouth	Eastern end of IL 110/CKC concurrency
Knox	Galesburg	45.50	73.23	46B	US 34 east – Kewanee	
Knox	Galesburg	48.09	77.39	48	East Main Street – Galesburg, East Galesburg	Westbound signed as exits 48A (west) and 48B (east)
Knox	Knoxville	50.87	81.87	51	CR 9 – Knoxville	
Knox	Knox Township	53.54	86.16	54	US 150 to IL 97 – Lewistown	
Peoria	Brimfield Township	71.15	114.50	71	To IL 78 – Canton, Kewanee	
Peoria	Brimfield	74.55	119.98	75	CR R25 (Maher Road) – Brimfield, Oak Hill	
Peoria	Kickapoo Township	81.78	131.61	82	Kickapoo, Edwards	
Peoria	Kickapoo Township	86.78	139.66	87A	I-474 east – Indianapolis	Western terminus of I-474; I-474 exit 0
Peoria	Kickapoo Township	86.78	139.66	87B	IL 6 north – Chillicothe	Southern terminus of IL 6; IL 6 exit 0
Peoria	Peoria	88.69	142.73	88	Sterling Avenue to US 150 (War Memorial Drive)	Access to US 150 signed eastbound only
Peoria	Peoria	89.15	143.47	89	US 150 (War Memorial Drive)	Access from eastbound I-74 to westbound US 150 and from eastbound US 150 to westbound I-74 at exit 88
Peoria	Peoria	90.22	145.20	90	Gale Avenue	
Peoria	Peoria	91.41	147.11	91	University Street	
Peoria	Peoria	92.41	148.72	92A	IL 40 north (Knoxville Avenue)	
Peoria	Peoria	92.41	148.72	92B	IL 40 south / Glen Oak Avenue – Downtown Peoria	
Peoria	Peoria				Glendale Avenue	Former right-in/right-out; replaced by exit 92B
Peoria	Peoria				Jefferson Avenue	Former interchange with no eastbound exit; replaced by exit 93
Peoria	Peoria	93.17– 93.26	149.94– 150.09	93	To IL 29 north / Washington Street	Eastbound exit and westbound entrance; serves General Wayne A. Downing Peoria International Airport
Peoria	Peoria	93.17– 93.26	149.94– 150.09	93	IL 29 north (Adams Street) / Jefferson Avenue – Downtown Peoria	Western end of IL 29 concurrency; westbound exit and eastbound entrance; serves General Wayne A. Downing Peoria International Airport
Illinois River		93.36– 93.89	150.25– 151.10	Murray Baker Bridge		
Tazewell	East Peoria	93.21	150.01	94	IL 40 north / Riverfront Drive – Downtown Peoria via Michel Bridge	Southern terminus of IL 40
Tazewell	East Peoria	95.02	152.92	95A	IL 29 south / US 150 / US 24 / IL 116 (North Main Street)	Eastern end of IL 29 concurrency; signed as exit 95 westbound
Tazewell	East Peoria	95.33	153.42	95B	US 150 / IL 8 east (Camp Street)	Eastbound exit and westbound entrance
Tazewell	East Peoria	95.52	153.72	96	To US 150 / IL 8 east / East Washington Street	
Tazewell	East Peoria	97.66	157.17	98	Pinecrest Drive	
Tazewell	East Peoria	99.00	159.33	99	I-474 west – Moline, Rock Island, Pekin	Eastern terminus of I-474; I-474 exit 15
Tazewell	Morton	101.02	162.58	101	I-155 south – Lincoln	Northern terminus of I-155
Tazewell	Morton	102.06	164.25	102	Morton	
Woodford	Goodfield	112.01	180.26	112	IL 117 north – Goodfield	Southern terminus of IL 117
McLean	Carlock	119.83	192.85	120	Carlock	
McLean	Dry Grove Township	124.99	201.15	125	US 150 (Rivian Motorway)	
McLean	Normal Township	127.10	204.55	127	I-55 north / US 51 north to I-39 north – Chicago, Rockford	Western end of I-55/US 51 concurrency; I-55 south exit 163
McLean	Bloomington	130.46	209.96	160 (Note: Exit number follows I-55)	US 150 / IL 9 (Market Street) – Pekin	
McLean	Bloomington	133.34	214.59	134A	I-55 south – St. Louis, Springfield	Eastern end of I-55 concurrency; I-55 north exit 157A
McLean	Bloomington	133.62	215.04	134B	I-55 BL north (Veterans Parkway) – Airport	
McLean	Bloomington Township	135.20	217.58	135	US 51 south (Main Street) / US 51 Bus. north – Decatur, Bloomington	Eastern end of US 51 concurrency
McLean	Downs	142.21	228.86	142	Downs	
McLean	Le Roy	149.00	239.79	149	Le Roy	
McLean	Empire Township	151.79	244.28	152	US 136 – Rantoul, Heyworth	
DeWitt	Farmer City	158.74	255.47	159	IL 54 – Farmer City, Gibson City	
Piatt	Blue Ridge Township	165.86	266.93	166	Mansfield	
Champaign	Mahomet	171.51	276.02	172	IL 47 – Gibson City, Mahomet	
Champaign	Mahomet	173.40	279.06	174	Prairieview Road	
Champaign	Champaign	178.65	287.51	179	I-57 to I-72 west – Memphis, Chicago, Decatur	Exit 237 on I-57
Champaign	Champaign	180.27	290.12	181	Prospect Avenue	
Champaign	Champaign	181.02	291.32	182	Neil Street	
Champaign	Urbana	182.30	293.38	183	Lincoln Avenue	
Champaign	Urbana	183.58	295.44	184	US 45 (Cunningham Avenue) – Rantoul	
Champaign	Urbana	185.05	297.81	185	IL 130 (University Avenue)	
Champaign	St. Joseph	191.90	308.83	192	St. Joseph	
Champaign	Ogden	196.41	316.09	197	To IL 49 south – Royal, Ogden	
Vermilion	Oakwood Township	199.42	320.94	200	IL 49 – Fithian, Rankin	
Vermilion	Oakwood Township	205.97	331.48	206	Potomac, Oakwood	
Vermilion	Danville Township	209.57	337.27	210	US 150 (M.L. King Drive)	
Vermilion	Danville	213.23	343.16	214	G Street	
Vermilion	Danville	213.95	344.32	215A	US 150 east / IL 1 south (Georgetown Road)	Cloverleaf interchange
Vermilion	Danville	213.95	344.32	215B	US 150 west / IL 1 north (Gilbert Street)	Cloverleaf interchange
Vermilion	Danville	215.48	346.78	216	Bowman Avenue, Perrysville Road	
Illinois–Indiana line		219.33– 219.66	352.98– 353.51	220	Lynch Road	Eastbound entrance extends into Indiana
Illinois–Indiana line		219.33– 219.66	352.98– 353.51		I-74 east – Indianapolis	Continuation into Indiana
1.000 mi = 1.609 km; 1.000 km = 0.621 mi: Closed/former; Concurrency terminus; Incomplete access

Interstate 74
Previous state: Iowa	Illinois	Next state: Indiana
