= U.S. Route 150 in Illinois =

Section of U.S. Numbered Highway in Illinois, US

U.S. Route 150
- US 150 highlighted in red

Route information
- Maintained by IDOT
- Length: 267.47 mi (430.45 km)
- Existed: 1936–present

Major junctions
- West end: US 6 in Moline
- US 34 / IL 110 (CKC) in Galesburg; I-74 east of Knoxville; I-74 in Peoria; I-74 in East Peoria; I-74 north of Yuton; I-55 / I-74 / US 51 in Bloomington; US 45 from Champaign to Urbana; I-74 near Batestown; I-74 in Tilton; US 36 south of Chrisman
- East end: US 150 east of Paris

Location
- Country: United States
- State: Illinois
- Counties: Rock Island, Henry, Knox, Peoria, Tazewell, Woodford, McLean, Piatt, Champaign, Vermilion, Edgar

Highway system
- United States Numbered Highway System; List; Special; Divided; Illinois State Highway System; Interstate; US; State; Tollways; Scenic
← IL 149	→ IL 150
← I-39	IL 39	→ US 40

U.S. Route 150 (US 150) in Illinois is a 267.47-mile-long (430.45 km) east–west highway that runs from US 6 near the Quad City International Airport in Moline to the Indiana state line near Vermilion. It closely parallels Interstate 74 (I-74) between Moline and Danville.

== Route description ==
=== Moline to Peoria ===
Starting at US 6, US 150 starts southeastward. It then intersects IL 81 west of Lynn Center. Then, north of Alpha, IL 17 begins to follow US 150. IL 17 then leaves US 150 south of Alpha. In Galesburg, US 150 meets US 34/IL 110 (CKC) at a cloverleaf. In downtown Galesburg, US 150 turns east and then southeast. It then turns east in Knoxville. East of Knoxville, it meets IL 97 at a 3-way intersection and then I-74 at a partial cloverleaf interchange. It then meets IL 180 south of Williamsfield. South of Laura, US 150 turns south via IL 78 for around three miles (4.8 km). Just south of where IL 78 branches off west, US 150 suddenly turns southeast. As it enters Peoria, it then meets IL 91 at a signalized intersection and then IL 6 at a partial cloverleaf. Further southeast, it meets I-74 at a modified trumpet interchange. It then meets IL 40 at a continuous-flow intersection. However, only northbound IL 40's left turn got displaced. Just before US 150 proceeds to cross the McClugage Bridge, it meets IL 29 at a parclo.

=== Peoria to Farmer City ===
After it crosses the bridge, it meets US 24 and IL 116 at a combination interchange. From there, US 24 runs concurrently with US 24 and IL 116. In East Peoria, only US 150 meets I-74 twice within the city limit. Between the two I-74 junctions, US 24 and IL 116 leave westward while IL 8 joins US 150. Just east of the incomplete interchange of I-74, IL 8 leaves northeastward. In Morton, US 150 crosses under I-74 numerous times without a direct interchange. One of them is in Morton, another south of Deer Creek, and another near Farmer City. Also, US 150 travels in an eastward direction. In Goodfield, it meets IL 117. Between Congerville and Carlock, it travels southward. North of Yuton, it meets I-74 at a diamond interchange. Then, IL 9 joins US 150 east until in downtown Bloomington. At downtown, US 150 turns southeast. It then intersects I-55 BL and then US 136. In Farmer City, it intersects IL 54.

=== Farmer City to Indiana state line ===
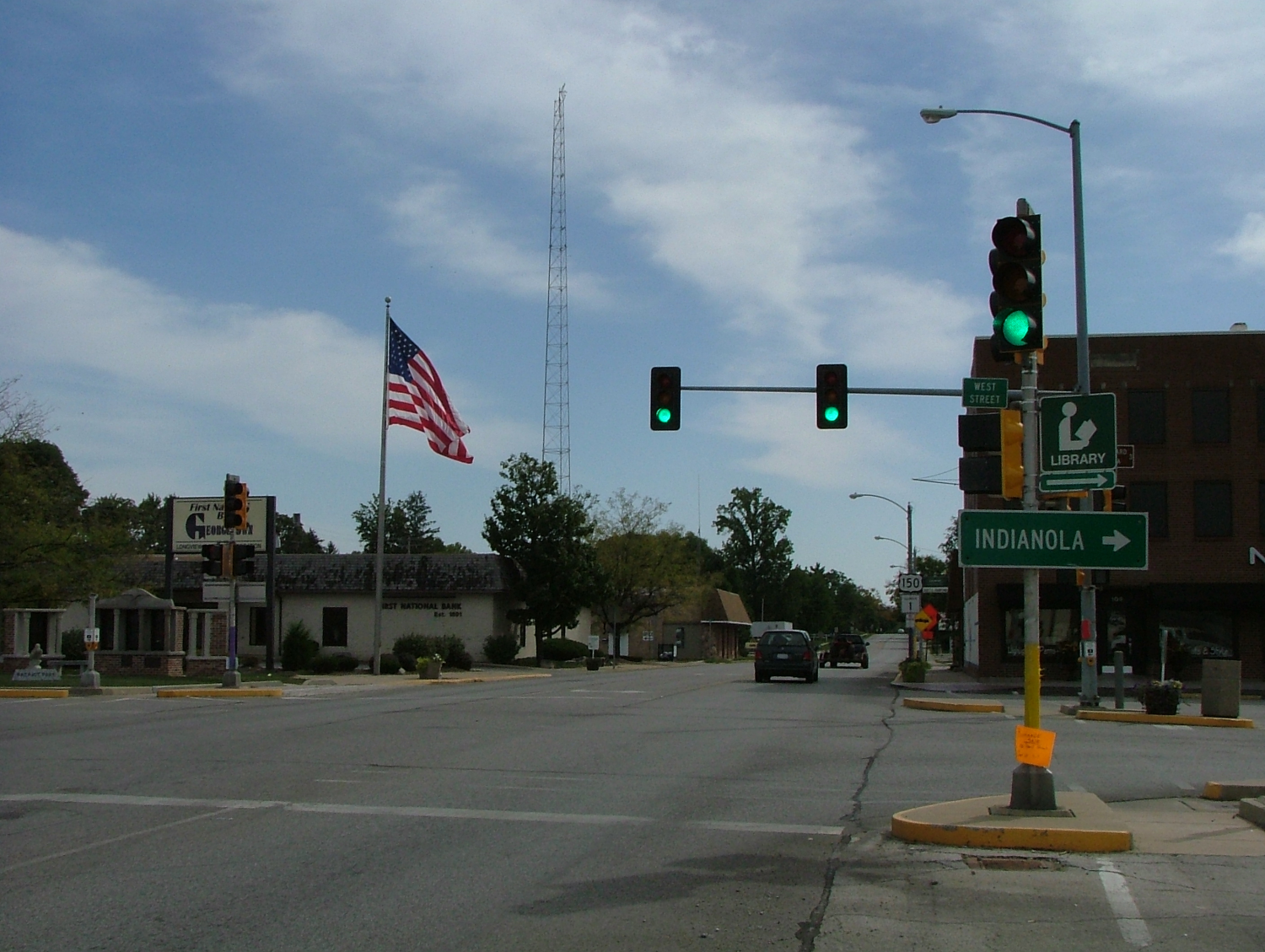
US 150/IL 1 concurrency in Georgetown

Continuing southeast, US 150 briefly runs concurrently with IL 47 in Mahomet. As it enters the city of Champaign, it crosses above I-57 with no direct interchange. Then, it turns east at the intersection of IL 10. Between Champaign and Urbana, US 45 follows US 150. It then runs concurrently with IL 130 at a short distance. From Ogden to near Fithian, IL 49 follows US 150. Then, near Batestown, it meets I-74 at a parclo. In Danville, US 150 and US 136 switch roads. At that point, US 150 follows IL 1 between Danville and Paris. They then meet I-74 in Tilton at a cloverleaf, and US 36 south of Chrisman. As they enter Paris, the routes become a one-way pair. At the junction where IL 16 and IL 133 ends, US 150 turns east while IL 1 keeps going south. Further east, US 150 reaches the Indiana state line.

== History ==
Illinois Route 39
- Location: Bloomington–Champaign
- Existed: 1918–1936

Before 1936, parts of IL 16, IL 39, IL 80, IL 91, and IL 121 ran on the current routing of US 150. In 1936, US 150 extended due northwest from Shoals, Indiana, to the Quad Cities. As a result, IL 39 and IL 91 were decommissioned, and IL 16, IL 80, and IL 121 were truncated.

In 1954, a portion of US 150 in Peoria moved from the Franklin Street Bridge to the McClugage Bridge. As a result, US 150 City, later US 150 Bus., appeared in Peoria from 1954 to 1964. Meanwhile, in Champaign–Urbana, another US 150 Bus. lasted from 1960 to 1966. In 1971, the decision to remove a portion of US 150 from US 67 in Rock Island to I-74 in Danville failed. However, in 1976, the decision to truncate US 150 from US 67 in Rock Island to US 6 near the Quad City Airport was approved.

== Major intersections ==
County	Location	mi	km	Destinations	Notes
Rock Island	Moline	0.0	0.0	US 6 to I-74 / I-280 – Moline, Rock Island, Geneseo	
Henry	Orion	13.4	21.6	IL 81 east / CR 7 to I-74 – Andover, Cambridge, Kewanee, Sherrard	
Henry		19.9	32.0	IL 17 west – New Windsor, Aledo	Western end of IL 17 overlap
Henry	Alpha	21.4	34.4	IL 17 east to I-74 – Galva	Eastern end of IL 17 overlap
Knox	Galesburg	35.3	56.8	US 34 / IL 110 (CKC) to I-74 – Kewanee, Monmouth	Interchange
Knox		45.5	73.2	IL 97 south – Havana, Maquon	
Knox	Knoxville	45.9	73.9	I-74 – Galesburg, Peoria	I-74 exit 54
Peoria	Williamsfield	58.6	94.3	IL 180 north (2250 East) – Williamsfield	
Peoria	Laura	63.1	101.5	IL 78 north – Kewanee	Western end of IL 78 overlap
Peoria	Brimfield	66.1	106.4	IL 78 south – Elmwood, Canton	Eastern end of IL 78 overlap
Peoria	Peoria	81.1	130.5	IL 91 north – Dunlap	
Peoria	Peoria	81.4	131.0	IL 6 to I-74 / I-474 – Chillicothe	IL 6 exit 2
Peoria	Peoria	85.1	137.0	I-74 – Bloomington, Galesburg	I-74 exit 89; no direct access from US 150 east to I-74 west or I-74 east to US 150 west
Peoria	Peoria	86.8	139.7	IL 40 (Knoxville Avenue) – Sterling	
Peoria	Peoria	89.0	143.2	IL 29 (Adams Street) – Chillicothe, Downtown Peoria	Interchange
Illinois River		89.1– 90.0	143.4– 144.8	McClugage Bridge	
Tazewell	East Peoria	90.5	145.6	US 24 east / IL 116 east – Washington, Metamora, Illinois Central College	Interchange; western end of US 24 / IL 116 overlap; US 150 and US 24 switch expressways
Tazewell	East Peoria	94.3	151.8	I-74 / IL 29 north – Bloomington, Peoria	I-74 exit 95A; western end of IL 29 overlap
Tazewell	East Peoria	94.6	152.2	US 24 west / IL 8 west / IL 29 south / IL 116 west (North Main Street)	Eastern end of US 24 / IL 29 / IL 116 overlap; western end of IL 8 overlap
Tazewell	East Peoria	95.0	152.9	I-74 west – Peoria	I-74 exit 95B; eastbound exit and westbound entrance
Tazewell	East Peoria	95.5	153.7	IL 8 east (East Washington Street) – Washington	Eastern end of IL 8 overlap
Woodford	Goodfield	112.8	181.5	IL 117 to I-74 – Eureka	
McLean	Carlock	127.7	205.5	I-74 – Champaign, Peoria	I-74 exit 125
McLean	Bloomington	131.4	211.5	IL 9 west – Pekin	Western end of IL 9 overlap
McLean	Bloomington	133.0	214.0	I-55 / I-74 / US 51 – Springfield, Champaign, Decatur, Joliet, Peoria, Rockford	I-55 exit 160
McLean	Bloomington	134.9	217.1	US 51 Bus. south (Center Street) / Historic US 66 – Decatur	
McLean	Bloomington	134.9	217.1	US 51 Bus. north (Main Street) / Historic US 66 – Peru, Wesleyan University	
McLean	Bloomington	135.4	217.9	IL 9 east (Locust Street) – Gibson City	Eastern end of IL 9 overlap
McLean	Bloomington	137.6	221.4	I-55 BL / Historic US 66 (Veterans Parkway)	Alternate route of Historic US 66
McLean	LeRoy	155.8	250.7	US 136 – Rantoul, Heyworth	
DeWitt	Farmer City	161.9	260.6	IL 54 – Gibson City, Clinton	
Piatt	No major junctions				
Champaign	Mahomet	174.2	280.3	IL 47 south (Division Street) to I-72	Western end of IL 47 overlap
Champaign	Mahomet	174.6	281.0	IL 47 north (Lombard Street) to I-74 – Gibson City, Early American Museum	Eastern end of IL 47 overlap
Champaign	Champaign	184.8	297.4	IL 10 west (Springfield Avenue) to I-57 / I-72 – Bondville	
Champaign	Champaign	185.5	298.5	US 45 south (Neil Street) – Pesotum, Business District	Western end of US 45 overlap
Champaign	Urbana	187.8	302.2	US 45 north (Cunningham Avenue) / Vine Street – Rantoul, Urbana Business District	Eastern end of US 45 overlap
Champaign	Urbana	188.9	304.0	IL 130 north to I-74 – Danville, Bloomington	Western end of IL 130 overlap
Champaign	Urbana	190.1	305.9	IL 130 south (High Cross Road) – Charleston	Eastern end of IL 130 overlap
Champaign	Ogden	201.0	323.5	IL 49 south to I-74 – Casey	Western end of IL 49 overlap
Vermilion	DeLong	204.0	328.3	IL 49 north – Kankakee	Eastern end of IL 49 overlap
Vermilion	Oakwood	215.0	346.0	I-74 – Champaign, Indianapolis	I-74 exit 210
Vermilion	Danville	219.0	352.4	US 136 / IL 1 north – Chicago, Business District	Western end of IL 1 overlap
Vermilion	Tilton	220.4	354.7	I-74 – Indianapolis, Champaign	I-74 exit 215
Edgar	Chrisman	242.3	389.9	US 36 – Indianapolis, Decatur	
Edgar	Paris	255.5	411.2	IL 1 south (Central Street) / IL 16 west / IL 133 west (Jasper Street) – Marshall, Charleston, Arcola	Eastern end of IL 1 overlap
Edgar	Vermilion	264.3	425.3	US 150 east – Terre Haute	Continuation into Indiana
1.000 mi = 1.609 km; 1.000 km = 0.621 mi: Concurrency terminus; Incomplete access

== See also ==
U.S. Route 150
Previous state: Terminus	Illinois	Next state: Indiana
