= Illinois Route 29 =

North-south state highway in Illinois, US

Illinois Route 29
- IL 29 highlighted in red

Route information
- Maintained by IDOT
- Length: 175.36 mi (282.21 km)
- Existed: November 5, 1918–present

Major junctions
- South end: US 51 / IL 16 in Pana
- I-55 / I-72 / US 36 in Springfield; US 136 in Mason City; I-474 / US 24 in Creve Coeur; US 150 / IL 8 in East Peoria; I-74 in East Peoria; I-74 in Peoria; US 150 in Peoria; I-180 / IL 26 in Princeton
- North end: US 6 / IL 89 in Spring Valley

Location
- Country: United States
- State: Illinois
- Counties: Christian, Sangamon, Menard, Mason, Tazewell, Peoria, Marshall, Putnam, Bureau

Highway system
- Illinois State Highway System; Interstate; US; State; Tollways; Scenic
← IL 26	→ US 30
← US 24	IL 24	→ IL 25

Illinois Route 29 (IL 29) is a two to four lane state highway that runs south from U.S. Route 6/Illinois Route 89 at Spring Valley to U.S. Route 51/Illinois Route 16 at Pana, running through Pekin, Peoria and Springfield. The nearest major north–south highway, Interstate 39, runs parallel to Illinois 29, but approximately fifty miles to the east. Illinois 29 is 175.36 miles (282.21 km) long.

== Route description ==
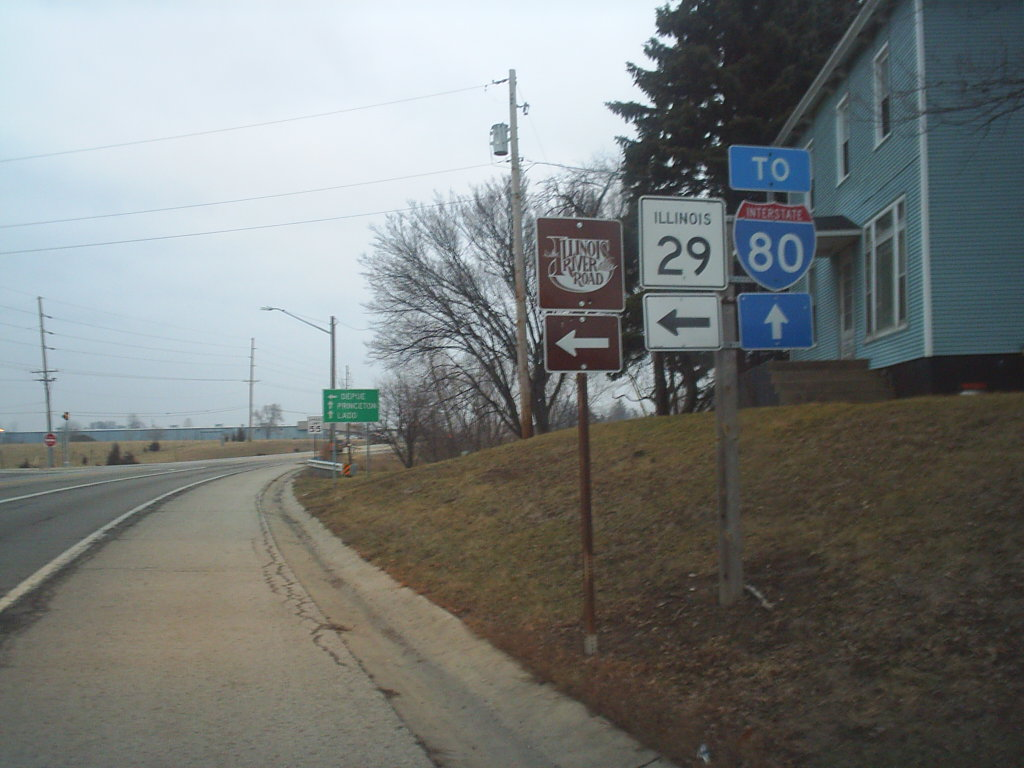
Northern terminus of IL 29 at US 6 and IL 89

Illinois 29 runs near the right bank (going down stream) which is (north and west) of the Illinois River from Spring Valley to Peoria. Starting at U.S. 6/Illinois 89 at the north edge of Spring Valley, the road passes through the small towns of Putnam and Henry, intersecting Illinois Route 18 at Henry. In Sparland, Illinois 29 intersects Illinois Route 17. It then runs beneath the bluff at Hopewell before becoming 4th Street, the main north–south artery through Chillicothe.

From the north end of Illinois Route 6 at Mossville south through Peoria and Peoria Heights, Route 29 is named Galena Road until it crosses U.S. Route 150 at the McClugage Bridge; from there the road is named Adams Street. In downtown Peoria, 29 splits from Adams Street onto Interstate 74 on the Murray Baker Bridge, where it crosses the Illinois River to East Peoria.

In East Peoria, Route 29 splits from Interstate 74 and proceeds south, entering Creve Coeur on Main Street and providing an interchange with Interstate 474. It enters Pekin as 8th Street and forks off as 5th Street before a short concurrency with Illinois Route 9 near the Pekin Bridge. Splitting onto 2nd Street (southbound) and 3rd Street (northbound) before crossing the bridge, Route 29 exits Pekin as 2nd Street, passing the Federal Correctional Institution, Pekin, and from there goes substantially directly south through Mason City to Springfield.

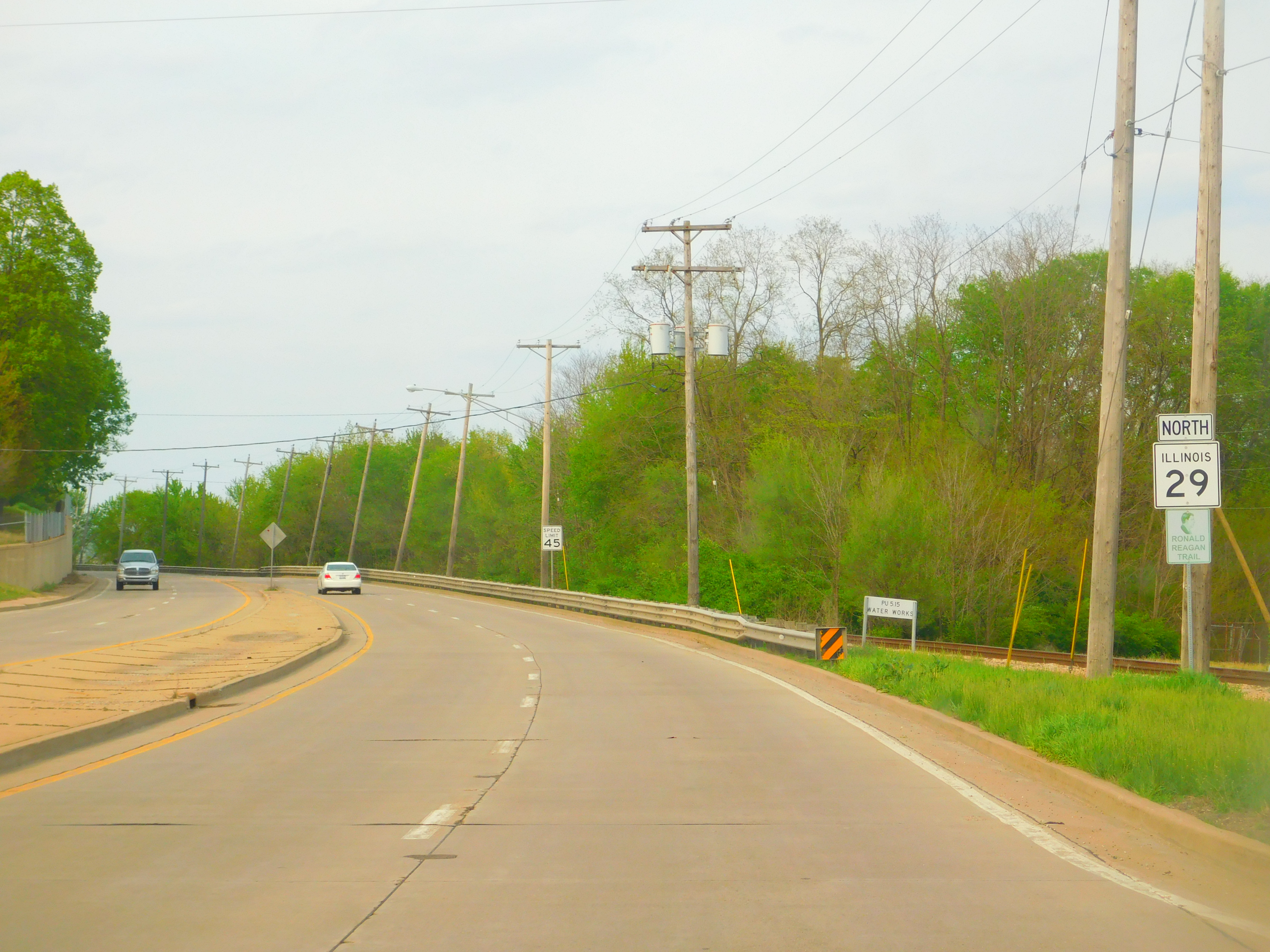
IL 29 in Peoria just north of the McClugage Bridge

Route 29 enters Springfield at the Abraham Lincoln Capital Airport, and runs around the north and east sides of the city. After leaving Springfield at an interchange with Interstate 55/Interstate 72/U.S. Route 36, Route 29 runs southeast through Taylorville, passing the end of Illinois Route 104 and crossing Illinois Route 48, then ending at U.S. Route 51/Illinois Route 16 in Pana.

== History ==
Route 29 was established in 1918, and ran from DePue to Peoria. It was extended twice over Illinois Route 24 in 1936 and 1940, and in 1942 replaced an old alignment of U.S. Route 6 from Bureau Junction to Spring Valley.

== Major intersections ==
County	Location	mi	km	Destinations	Notes
Christian	Pana	0.0	0.0	US 51 / IL 16 (Jackson Street / Cedar Street) – Vandalia, Mattoon, Decatur	Southern terminus
Christian	Pana	0.6	0.97	To Poplar Street south / US 51 – Vandalia	
Christian	Taylorville	16.0	25.7	To IL 48 – Assumption, Decatur, Raymond, Christian County Historical Museum	Grade separated, access via East Main Cross Street
Christian	Taylorville	18.3	29.5	IL 104 west – Kincaid, Jacksonville, Sangchris Lake State Park	Eastern terminus of IL 104
Sangamon	Springfield	40.6	65.3	I-55 / I-72 / US 36 – St. Louis, Chicago, Champaign	I-55 exit 96; cloverleaf interchange
Sangamon	Springfield	41.9	67.4	IL 97 to I-72 / US 36 – Havana	
Sangamon	Springfield	45.6	73.4	I-55 BL south / Historic US 66 west (Peoria Road) / Sangamon Avenue – Benedictine University, Abraham Lincoln Capital Airport	South end of I-55 Bus. / Historic US 66 overlap
Sangamon	Springfield	46.4	74.7	Historic US 66 (1926-30) west (Taintor Road)	
Sangamon	Springfield	46.7	75.2	I-55 BL north / Historic US 66 east (Peoria Road) to I-55	North end of I-55 Bus. / Historic US 66 overlap; north end of IL 4 overlap
Sangamon		48.5	78.1	IL 4 south (Veterans Parkway) / J. David Jones Parkway – Chatham, Springfield, Illinois State Military Museum	South end of IL 4 overlap
Sangamon		56.3	90.6	IL 123 east to I-55 – Williamsville	South end of IL 123 overlap
Menard		62.1	99.9	IL 123 west – Petersburg, Lincoln's New Salem State Historic Site	North end of IL 123 overlap
Mason		76.4	123.0	IL 10 – Easton, Mason City	
Mason		83.9	135.0	US 136 west – Havana, Manito	South end of US 136 overlap
Mason		86.8	139.7	US 136 east – McLean	North end of US 136 overlap
Tazewell	Green Valley	91.4	147.1	IL 122 east – Bloomington	Western terminus of IL 122
Tazewell	Pekin	105.7	170.1	IL 9 west (Veterans Drive)	South end of IL 9 overlap
Tazewell	Pekin	105.9	170.4	IL 9 east (Margaret Street)	North end of IL 9 overlap
Tazewell	Pekin–North Pekin line	108.4	174.5	IL 98 east – Morton	Western terminus of IL 98
Tazewell	Creve Coeur	110.6	178.0	I-474 / US 24 west – Galesburg, Bloomington	South end of US 24 overlap; I-474 exit 9
Tazewell	East Peoria	113.7	183.0	IL 8 west / IL 116 west – Peoria	Interchange; south end of IL 8 / IL 116 overlap
Tazewell	East Peoria	114.2	183.8	US 150 east / IL 8 east (East Camp Street)	North end of IL 8 overlap; south end of US 150 overlap; interchange
Tazewell	East Peoria	114.4	184.1	I-74 east / US 24 east / US 150 west / IL 116 east – Bloomington	South end of I-74 overlap; north end of US 24 / US 150 / IL 116 overlap; I-74 exit 95A
Tazewell	East Peoria	115.2	185.4	Riverfront Drive, Bob Michel Bridge – Downtown Peoria	
Illinois River		115.8	186.4	Murray Baker Bridge	
Peoria	Peoria	116.2	187.0	I-74 west / Illinois River Road south – Galesburg	North end of I-74 overlap; south end of Illinois River Road overlap; I-74 exit 93
Peoria	Peoria	118.8	191.2	US 150 (War Memorial Drive, McClugage Bridge) to US 24 – Washington	Interchange
Peoria	Mossville	126.1	202.9	IL 6 south – Peoria	Northern terminus of IL 6
Marshall	Sparland	142.3	229.0	IL 17 east to I-39 – Lacon	South end of IL 17 overlap
Marshall	Sparland	142.6	229.5	IL 17 west to IL 40 – Wyoming, Galva	North end of IL 17 overlap
Marshall	Henry	149.4	240.4	IL 18 east – Magnolia, Business District	Western terminus of IL 18
Bureau	Hennepin	158.9	255.7	CR 16 west to I-180 – Hennepin, Tiskilwa, Kewanee	Eastern terminus of CR 16
Bureau	Tiskilwa	161.6	260.1	IL 26 south – Hennepin	South end of IL 26 overlap
Bureau	Bureau Junction	162.7	261.8	IL 26 north / Illinois River Road – Princeton	North end of IL 26 overlap; Illinois River Road spur to Princeton
Bureau	Spring Valley	175.36	282.21	US 6 / IL 89 / Illinois River Road north – Ladd, Spring Valley, LaSalle	Northern terminus
1.000 mi = 1.609 km; 1.000 km = 0.621 mi: Concurrency terminus

== See also ==
- Bridges in Peoria, Illinois
