= Bridges in Peoria, Illinois =

Peoria and East Peoria, Illinois are separated by the Illinois River, a 240-mile (386 km) long body of water that reaches up to a mile across in places along Peoria Lake. The Illinois River is one of six rivers that are included in the Lower Illinois River Basin which extends between Ottawa, Illinois and the Mississippi River at Grafton, Illinois. Three of the six rivers in the Lower Illinois River Basin (Spoon River, Illinois River, and Mackinaw River) are in central Illinois. Their combined length is 535 nautical miles (991 km). Of these waterways the Illinois is thought to be the only river large enough to support barge traffic.

In the Peoria area, there are six bridges that cross the Illinois River. Because of the topography of the cities, alignments of the numerous state routes that cross the Illinois River can be somewhat confusing. However, these routes are generally well marked. All bridges that span the Illinois River are required to be built a minimum of 70 feet (21 m) above the average river level, as the Illinois River is the main route for river traffic between New Orleans and Chicago. The Illinois River is part of a waterway system that begins in New Orleans, Louisiana and exits the Atlantic Ocean via Chicago and the Saint Lawrence Seaway.

== Main articles ==
- Cedar Street Bridge
- Bob Michel Bridge
- Murray Baker Bridge
- McClugage Bridge
- Shade-Lohmann Bridge
