= Illinois Route 6 =

State highway in Peoria County, Illinois, US

Illinois Route 6
- IL 6 highlighted in red

Route information
- Maintained by IDOT
- Length: 10.11 mi (16.27 km)
- Existed: 1981–present

Major junctions
- South end: I-74 / I-474 in Peoria
- US 150 / IL 40 in Peoria
- North end: IL 29 in Mossville

Location
- Country: United States
- State: Illinois
- Counties: Peoria

Highway system
- Illinois State Highway System; Interstate; US; State; Tollways; Scenic
← US 6	→ IL 7

Illinois Route 6 is a 4-lane freeway entirely in Peoria County in central Illinois. It begins as a northern extension of Interstate 474 at Interstate 74 west of Peoria, and ends at Illinois Route 29 in Mossville, south of Chillicothe. The freeway currently has a total length of 10.11 miles (16.27 km), including the connector ramp to Illinois 29.

== Route description ==
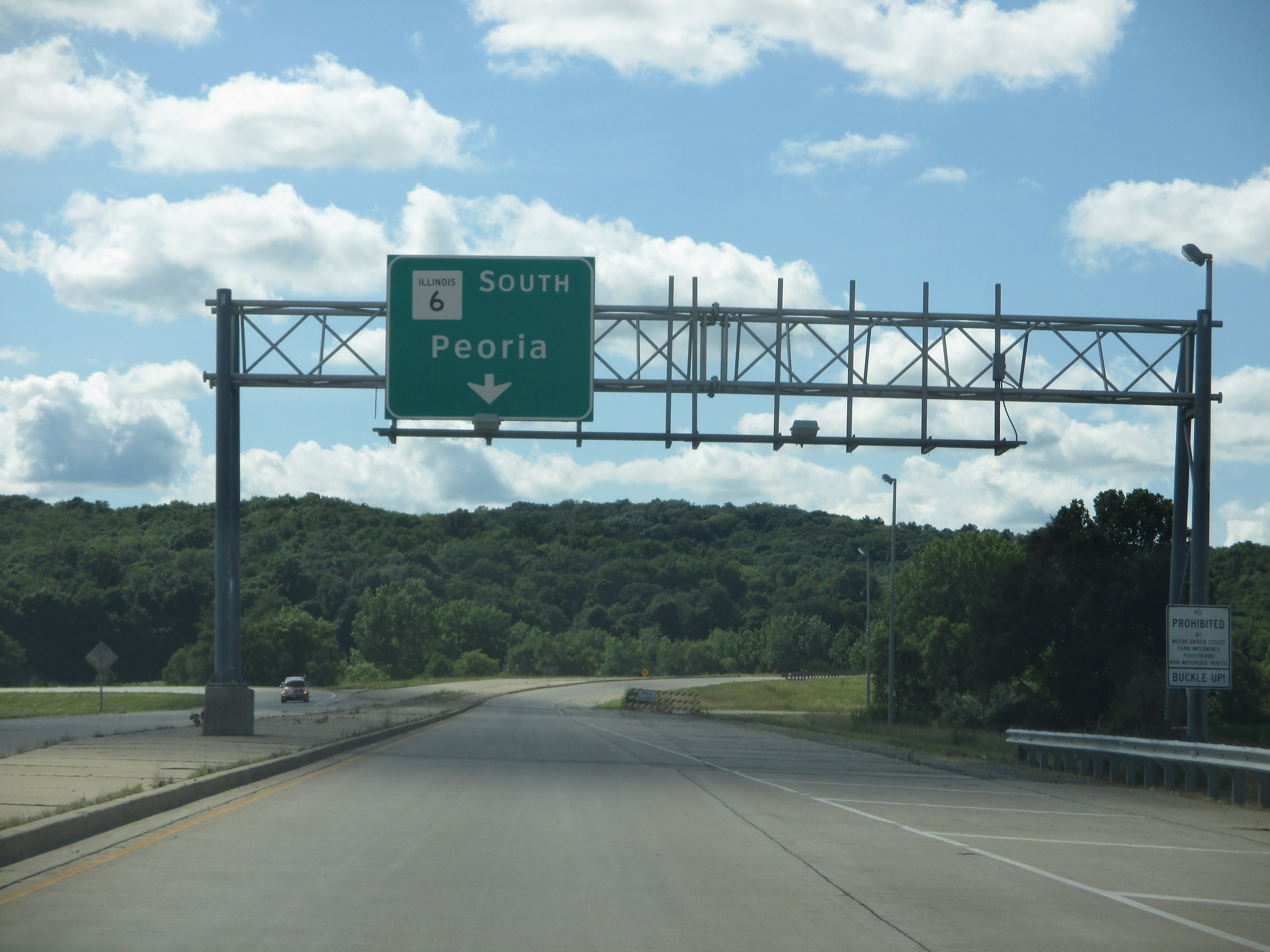
IL 6 approaching an indefinitely unfinished trumpet interchange

Although fairly short, Illinois 6 draws more traffic than a rural highway because it passes through the developing north and northwest edge of Peoria. A one-mile (1.6 km) stretch of road around the U.S. Route 150 (War Memorial Drive) exit has become a major commercial development area that now includes a major mall and a nearby strip mall with over 30 movie screens between them. In addition, new development is occurring rapidly around the other interchanges of Allen Road (old Illinois Route 174), Knoxville Avenue (Illinois Route 40), and Illinois Route 29.

== History ==
SBI Route 6 initially ran from Fulton to Chicago. It roughly followed present-day US 30, Illinois Route 38, and Roosevelt Road. In 1935, IL 6 was decommissioned and was replaced with a portion of US 330 (now IL 38/Roosevelt Road) and US 30.

The Illinois Route 6 designation remained decommissioned until 1981 when a part of the present freeway from I-74/I-474 to IL 91 opened. By 1984, the freeway was extended east toward IL 88 (current IL 40). In November 1985, the freeway was extended to Illinois Route 29 near Mossville.

== Future ==
Several plans have been considered for continuing the Illinois 6 corridor. One is extending Illinois 6 into a loop by building a bridge over the Illinois River and running the highway south to Interstates 74 and 474 near Interstate 155 in Morton. Another is to build north or northeast from the current terminus to a new interchange in Chillicothe, connecting with a proposed Illinois 29 expressway that would connect to Interstate 180.

In 2013, Illinois Governor Pat Quinn proposed a $12.3 billion road plan that earmarked funds for engineering work and corridor studies, renewing interest in connecting Route 6 with I-74.

== Exit list ==
The entire route is in Peoria County.

Location	mi	km	Exit	Destinations	Notes
	0.00	0.00		I-474 east – Bloomington	Continuation beyond I-74; serves Peoria International Airport
	0.00	0.00	0	I-74 – Galesburg, Peoria	I-74 exit 87B; southern terminus & signed as exits 0A (west) & 0B (east)
Peoria	2.32	3.73	2	US 150 (War Memorial Drive) – Kickapoo	
Peoria	5.51	8.87	5	Allen Road	
Peoria	6.54	10.53	6	IL 40 (Knoxville Avenue) – Bradford	
Mossville	10.18	16.38		IL 29 – Chillicothe, Mossville	Northern terminus
1.000 mi = 1.609 km; 1.000 km = 0.621 mi
