= Illinois Route 49 =

North-south state highway in Illinois, US

Illinois Route 49
- IL 49 highlighted in red

Route information
- Maintained by IDOT
- Length: 140.86 mi (226.69 km)
- Existed: 1924–present

Major junctions
- South end: IL 33 in Willow Hill
- US 40 in Casey; I-70 in Casey; US 36 in Metcalf; US 150 in Ogden; I-74 in Fithian; US 136 in Armstrong; US 24 in Crescent City
- North end: US 45 / US 52 in Ashkum

Location
- Country: United States
- State: Illinois
- Counties: Jasper, Cumberland, Clark, Coles, Edgar, Douglas, Champaign, Vermilion, Iroquois

Highway system
- Illinois State Highway System; Interstate; US; State; Tollways; Scenic
| ← IL 48 | → US 50 |

Illinois Route 49 (IL 49) is a 140.86-mile-long (226.69 km) north–south state highway in east-central Illinois. It runs from Willow Hill at IL 33 north to the beginning of the U.S. Route 45/52 concurrency near Ashkum.

== Route description ==
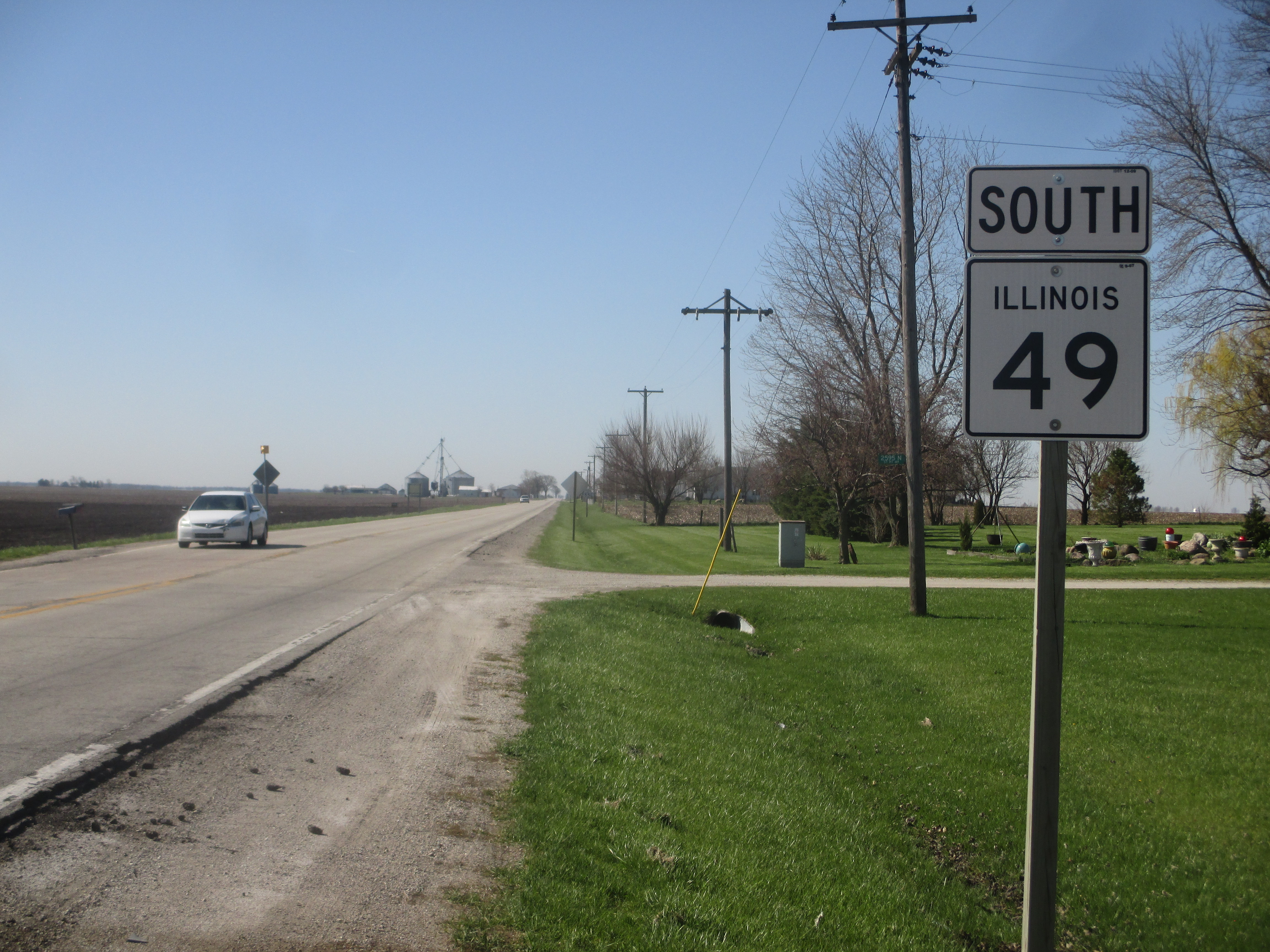
IL 49 begins southbound at US 45/US 52 near L'Erable

Illinois 49 runs for its length entirely as an undivided surface highway. It serves minor cities between Illinois Route 1 to the east and Interstate 57 to the west.

== History ==
SBI Route 49 originally ran from Willow Hill all the way to Chicago along what is now U.S. Route 52/45 and Illinois Route 50. In February 1933, the section of IL 49 from Kankakee to Chicago was designated as part of the Egyptian Highway. In 1942, U.S. Route 54 was extended to Chicago along Illinois 49 north of Kankakee. In 1969, Illinois 49 was truncated to its current northern end. When U.S. 54 was pulled back to Pittsfield in 1972, Illinois 50 took the place of Illinois 49 and U.S. 54.

== Major intersections ==
| County | Location | mi | km | Destinations | Notes |
|---|---|---|---|---|---|
| Jasper | | 0.0 | 0.0 | IL 33 | |
| Cumberland | No major junctions | | | | |
| Clark | Casey | 22.4 | 36.0 | US 40 – Greenup, Marshall | |
| Clark | | 23.3 | 37.5 | I-70 – Effingham, Terre Haute | I-70 exit 129 |
| Coles | | 38.7 | 62.3 | IL 16 west – Charleston | South end of IL 16 concurrency |
| Edgar | Kansas | 41.3 | 66.5 | IL 16 east – Paris | North end of IL 16 concurrency |
| Edgar | | 47.7 | 76.8 | IL 133 | |
| Edgar–Douglas county line | | 57.8 | 93.0 | US 36 – Indianapolis, Decatur | |
| Champaign | Ogden | 80.9 | 130.2 | US 150 west – Urbana | South end of US 150 concurrency |
| Vermilion | | 83.9 | 135.0 | US 150 east – Danville | North end of US 150 concurrency |
| Vermilion | | 84.7 | 136.3 | I-74 – Champaign, Danville | I-74 exit 200 |
| Vermilion | | 97.5 | 156.9 | US 136 east – Danville | South end of US 136 concurrency |
| Vermilion | | 98.3 | 158.2 | US 136 west | North end of US 136 concurrency |
| Vermilion | Rankin | 108.3 | 174.3 | IL 9 | |
| Iroquois | Crescent City | 131.8 | 212.1 | US 24 – Gilman, Watseka | |
| Iroquois | | 140.86 | 226.69 | US 45 / US 52 – Kankakee, Pontiac, Sheldon | |
1.000 mi = 1.609 km; 1.000 km = 0.621 mi: Concurrency terminus
