= Le Roy, Illinois =

Le Roy
- City
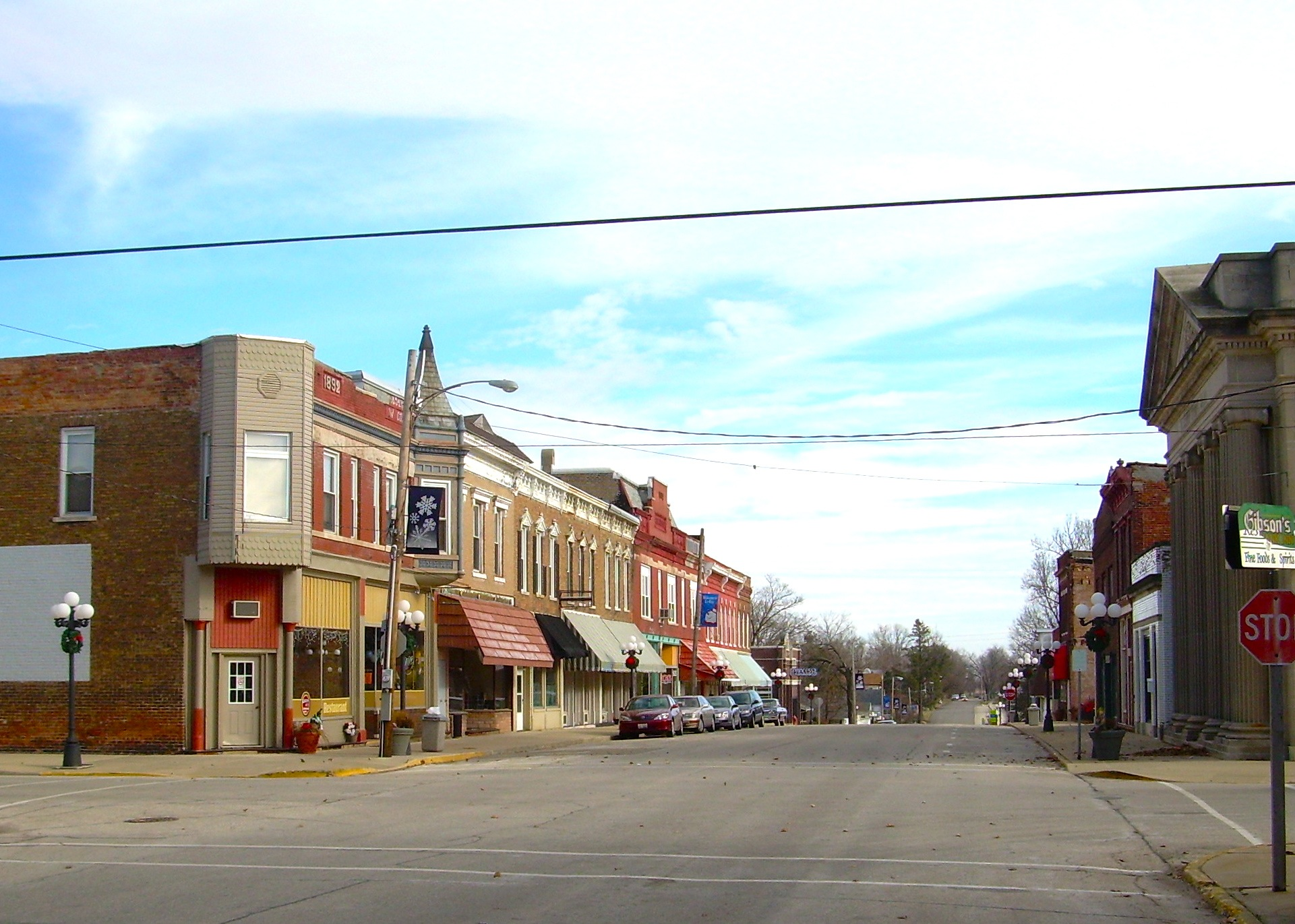
- Downtown Le Roy, Illinois
- Motto: "Creating our past by investing in our future"
- Location of Le Roy in McLean County, Illinois.
- Coordinates: 40°20′22″N 88°45′46″W
- Country: United States
- State: Illinois
- County: McLean
- Township: Empire

Government
  - Type: Mayor and council

Area
  - Total: 2.42 sq mi (6.27 km^{2})
  - Land: 2.41 sq mi (6.23 km^{2})
  - Water: 0.019 sq mi (0.05 km^{2})
- Elevation: 781 ft (238 m)

Population (2020)
  - Total: 3,512
  - Density: 1,460.9/sq mi (564.07/km^{2})
- Demonym: Le Royan
- Time zone: UTC-6 (CST)
  - Summer (DST): UTC-5 (CDT)
- ZIP code: 61752
- Area code: 309
- FIPS code: 17-42971
- GNIS ID: 2395656
- Website: www.leroy.org

Le Roy (also styled "LeRoy") is a city in McLean County, Illinois, United States. The population was 3,512 at the 2020 census.

== History ==
=== Founding of LeRoy ===
LeRoy was laid out on 28 November 1835 by Asahel Gridley (26 April 1810 – 25 January 1881) and Merritt L. Covell (30 January 1808 – 17 September 1847). The founders were Bloomington businessmen. They had served together in the Black Hawk War, Covell as a captain and Gridley as a lieutenant. Because of their brief service both men were popularly called "General". Both would later serve in the Illinois General Assembly, and Gridley would eventually become McLean County's first millionaire.

LeRoy was the first of eight towns to be laid out within the present boundaries of McLean County during the great Illinois town-founding boom which peaked in the summer of 1836. LeRoy was located on a low mound, on prairie land, where the Bloomington to Danville state road crossed the road from Shelbyville to Chicago. The chief problem confronting Gridley and Covell was a place called Munroe, which consisted of a single store run by John W. Baddeley (24 June 1794 – 19 February 1871). It was located a mile and a half southwest of the new town. Although generally said to have been laid out in 1834 or 1836, no plat of the town has yet been found. Baddeley had been born in Whitchurch, Shropshire, England, and had come to the United States with his family in 1832. He had quickly entered a thousand acres (4 km^{2}) of land in Empire Township and seemed on his way to becoming a wealthy and important man. Baddeley was offered twenty-seven prime lots in LeRoy if he would move his store to the newly established town. Baddeley agreed. He lost most of his fortune in 1837 but continued to do business in LeRoy for many years.

=== Original design of the town ===
Like most Central Illinois towns of the 1830s LeRoy was built around a central "Public Circle". The circle at LeRoy featured streets which joined the public area midway along each side and is very similar to squares platted at Mt. Hope, Danvers, and Lexington. Except for some rounding at the corners to ease the flow of traffic, the square today retains its 1835 shape. Gridley and Covell's "Original Town" contained twenty-five blocks, almost all with eight lots, for a total of 196 lots. Early commercial growth was along Center Street just east of the square, and this has continued to be the commercial heart of the town. The original street names selected for LeRoy are virtually identical to those in the town of Lexington, which Gridley also co-founded: Center, Cedar, Cherry, Chestnut, East, Elm, Main North, Oak, Pine, Vine, Walnut and West. Unlike Lexington, LeRoy has no South Street.

=== First advertisement ===
In November 1835 Gridley and Covell set about selling lots in their new town. They published a lengthy advertisement in the Sangamon Journal which is both the earliest description of LeRoy and a statement of why the two men had selected this location for a town. It begins with the bold heading "Town of Leroy". The reader is first told that Leroy was located on the north side of Buckle's Grove on Salt Creek. The crossing of the two roads is noted along with being 16 miles (26 km) east of Bloomington. "The site of the town is as beautiful as can well be conceived – situated on the margin of a rolling undulating prairie on an eminence gently descending in every direction and commanding an extensive view of the surrounding country, with an open expanse of prairie scenery on the north and west relieved by occasional groves of timber. No situation can well surpass it for beauty." They go on to write that LeRoy is "... located in the heart of a rich and flourishing settlement with a large amount of timber of quality inferior to none in the state in its immediate vicinity... it is believed that no interior town possesses superior advantages." Several excellent mill sites were located nearby. The advertisement concludes, "A further description is deemed unnecessary, as all who wish to make investments will doubtless visit it previous to investing." Unlike many ads of the period, the date and time of the auction of town lots is not given. Later sources relate that the lots sold well, "the bidding was spirited, and some of them sold at a high price."

=== Early development of the town ===
The early growth of LeRoy was slow, but the town did better than many other towns laid out in the 1830s. Only three of the eight McLean County towns laid out during the 1830s boom still survive—Danvers, LeRoy, and Lexington. During the fall of 1836, several log cabins were built in the town and Edgar Conkling erected a frame store. Gridley persuaded Hiram Buck to move to LeRoy and establish a hotel; in 1838 Buck became Post Master. In 1836 Conkling and a partner laid out a vast new addition to the town that tripled its size. The first mill, built by Elisha Gibbs on the south side of the town, burned in 1844. Buckles and Farmer responded by building a second mill that also burned. The first large brick commercial building was built for T. J. Barnett in 1858 at a cost of $3,000. By 1850, LeRoy had established itself as the second largest town in the county. It was incorporated as a town in 1853 and as a city 10 August 1874.

=== Railroad era ===
After the Civil War, the citizens of LeRoy were convinced that only a railroad could assure the prosperity of their town, and they took the lead in campaigning for what would eventually become the Indiana, Bloomington and Western Railway. In 1866 a meeting was held in LeRoy to generate support for the railroad. The following year, by a vote of 202 to 6, they voted to tax themselves to help pay for the railroad. Eventually they would subscribe $75,000 in bonds to the railroad. The railroad would pass through the southwest corner of the original town, with the depot located five blocks west of the square in Block 44 of Conkling's Addition. On 1 May 1870 the first train steamed into town. Disappointment quickly followed. The bonds were promptly hypothecated, that is, used as security to borrow money. In practice this meant that the citizens of LeRoy still had to pay each year, but had no say in the running of the railroad. The new railroad found itself in deep legal and financial trouble. Service was poor and rates exorbitant. Rather than simply complain, the people of LeRoy decided to build their own railroad. The narrow-gauge railway was begun in 1876. It ran down the center of Oak Street eastward to Rantoul, in Champaign County, where it joined the Illinois Central. The idea was to bring down freight rates by providing competition for the I.B. & W. Much of the labor was done by local people. Local people called it the "Pumpkin Vine", a popular folk name for any small railroad, also applied to several railroads in Indiana. The railroad was eventually sold to the Illinois Central and widened to standard gauge. It never carried a great deal of traffic, but was the object of a great deal of local pride.

=== In the twentieth century ===
By 1900, LeRoy had two newspapers, four churches, one hotel, two grain elevators, three doctors, three lawyers, and twenty-five stores. Its population was 1,629. Slowly LeRoy ceased to be a railroad town. Passenger service on the "pumpkin vine" ended in 1931. Passenger service on the railroad between Bloomington and Urbana ended in 1957. The depot in LeRoy was torn down in 1967, and the last train ran in 1980. Soon after that the tracks were torn up. In the early 1970s, Interstate 74 was completed and new businesses began to develop near the highway exit. Population growth between 1900 and 1950 growth was slow, just under twelve percent. However, by the end of the century the population of LeRoy had more than doubled as the town increasingly became a residential center for both Bloomington–Normal and Champaign–Urbana.

== Geography ==
According to the 2010 census, Le Roy has a total area of 2.336 square miles (6.05 km^{2}), of which 2.32 square miles (6.01 km^{2}) (or 99.32%) is land and 0.016 square miles (0.04 km^{2}) (or 0.68%) is water.

== Demographics ==
Historical population
Census	Pop.	Note	%±
1850	210		—
1860	654		211.4%
1870	862		31.8%
1880	1,068		23.9%
1890	1,258		17.8%
1900	1,629		29.5%
1910	1,702		4.5%
1920	1,680		−1.3%
1930	1,595		−5.1%
1940	1,783		11.8%
1950	1,820		2.1%
1960	2,088		14.7%
1970	2,435		16.6%
1980	2,870		17.9%
1990	2,777		−3.2%
2000	3,332		20.0%
2010	3,560		6.8%
2020	3,512		−1.3%
Decennial US Census

=== 2020 census ===
As of the 2020 census, Le Roy had a population of 3,512. The median age was 39.7 years. 25.1% of residents were under the age of 18 and 15.9% of residents were 65 years of age or older. For every 100 females there were 95.8 males, and for every 100 females age 18 and over there were 92.0 males age 18 and over.

0.0% of residents lived in urban areas, while 100.0% lived in rural areas.

There were 1,450 households in Le Roy, of which 33.4% had children under the age of 18 living in them. Of all households, 52.3% were married-couple households, 17.7% were households with a male householder and no spouse or partner present, and 25.0% were households with a female householder and no spouse or partner present. About 30.0% of all households were made up of individuals and 13.1% had someone living alone who was 65 years of age or older.

There were 1,536 housing units, of which 5.6% were vacant. The homeowner vacancy rate was 1.9% and the rental vacancy rate was 6.7%.

Racial composition as of the 2020 census
Race	Number	Percent
White	3,330	94.8%
Black or African American	13	0.4%
American Indian and Alaska Native	8	0.2%
Asian	4	0.1%
Native Hawaiian and Other Pacific Islander	1	0.0%
Some other race	21	0.6%
Two or more races	135	3.8%
Hispanic or Latino (of any race)	65	1.9%

=== 2000 census ===
As of the census of 2000, there were 3,332 people, 1,300 households, and 920 families residing in the city. The population density was 1,500.3 inhabitants per square mile (579.3/km^{2}). There were 1,367 housing units at an average density of 615.5 per square mile (237.6/km^{2}). The racial makeup of the city was 99.21% White, 0.06% African American, 0.12% Native American, 0.09% Asian, 0.27% from other races, and 0.21% from two or more races. Hispanic or Latino of any race were 1.20% of the population.

There were 1,300 households, out of which 36.6% had children under the age of 18 living with them, 59.7% were married couples living together, 8.2% had a female householder with no husband present, and 29.2% were non-families. 25.6% of all households were made up of individuals, and 12.5% had someone living alone who was 65 years of age or older. The average household size was 2.51 and the average family size was 3.03.

In the city, the population was spread out, with 27.2% under the age of 18, 6.4% from 18 to 24, 31.2% from 25 to 44, 19.7% from 45 to 64, and 15.5% who were 65 years of age or older. The median age was 36 years. For every 100 females, there were 91.6 males. For every 100 females age 18 and over, there were 87.0 males.

The median income for a household in the city was $45,781, and the median income for a family was $53,986. Males had a median income of $35,784 versus $27,450 for females. The per capita income for the city was $20,743. About 0.6% of families and 1.9% of the population were below the poverty line, including 2.0% of those under age 18 and 3.0% of those age 65 or over.

== Recreation ==
LeRoy maintains several parks and playgrounds as well as the Replex, a community recreation center (indoor and outdoor pools, weight room, gymnasium, and meeting rooms). Every August, LeRoy hosts the annual LeRoy Fall Festival.

== Notable people ==
- Tim Hendryx, outfielder for various teams
- Bret Iwan, current voice of Mickey Mouse; attended Le Roy High School 1996–2000
- John Allen Sterling, U.S. Representative 1903–13, 1915–18; born in Le Roy
- Betty Jane Watson, actress
