= U.S. Route 51 Business (Bloomington–Normal, Illinois) =

Business route in Illinois, United States

U.S. Route 51 Business
- US 51 Bus. highlighted in red

Route information
- Maintained by IDOT
- Length: 8.9 mi (14.3 km)
- Existed: 1990–present

Major junctions
- South end: I-74 / US 51 south of Bloomington
- I-55 BL in Bloomington; US 150 / IL 9 in Bloomington; I-55 in Normal
- North end: I-39 / US 51 north of Normal

Location
- Country: United States
- State: Illinois
- County: McLean

Highway system
- United States Numbered Highway System; List; Special; Divided; Illinois State Highway System; Interstate; US; State; Tollways; Scenic

U.S. Route 51 Business (US 51 Bus.) is a business route of US 51 in Bloomington–Normal. It provides service to downtown Bloomington and downtown Normal.

== Route description ==
Starting at the I-74/US 51 interchange, US 51 Business traveled northward via Main Street towards downtown Bloomington. It then meets Interstate 55 Business Loop at a diamond interchange. Shortly after crossing under the interchange, the route then splits into a one-way pair. The northbound route then continues to follow Main Street. However, the southbound route follows Center Street. Continuing north, the route splits even further out near the McLean County Courthouse and Square. Eventually, south of Locust Street, the one-way pair comes closer together but not completely. At Locust Street, the route meets eastbound US 150/IL 9. Southwest of the Illinois Wesleyan University, it meets westbound US 150/IL 9. At Division Street, it leaves Bloomington and enters Normal.

South of the Amtrak railroad overpass, the business route starts to come together. After crossing under the overpass, the southbound route then moves slightly outward (following Kingsley Street). In the Illinois State University, the southbound and the northbound route come together at Main Street/College Avenue. Going further north, it then meets I-55 at a 5-ramp parclo. Going further north, it curves west towards I-39/US 51. At that point, the business route ends.

== History ==
Initially, US 51 ran straight through downtown Bloomington and Normal. This routing remained like that for a while until around 1991. In the meantime, in 1965, a full cloverleaf interchange was built to serve present-day I-55. In 1966, a parclo interchange was built to serve present-day I-74. By 1979, a parclo interchange that served I-55 Business Loop then became a diamond interchange. Then, in 1990, US 51 bypassed downtown Bloomington and Normal via I-39, I-55, and I-74. As a result, US 51 Business was formed. This also resulted in the cloverleaf interchange (which served I-55) becoming a 5-ramp parclo. To this day, the business route is still intact.

== Major intersections ==
The entire route is in McLean County.

| Location | mi | km | Destinations | Notes |
|---|---|---|---|---|
| Bloomington | 0.0 | 0.0 | I-74 / US 51 – Champaign, Peoria, Rockford, Decatur | Southern terminus of US 51 Bus.; roadway continues south as US 51 |
| Bloomington | 1.6 | 2.6 | I-55 BL / Historic US 66 west (Veterans Parkway) – Chicago, St. Louis | Southern end of Historic Route 66 concurrency; interchange |
| Bloomington | 3.4 | 5.5 | US 150 east / IL 9 east (Locust Street) – Champaign, Gibson City, Central Illinois Regional Airport | One-way road (eastbound only) |
| Bloomington | 3.7 | 6.0 | US 150 west / IL 9 west (Empire Street) – Peoria | One-way road (westbound only) |
| Normal | 5.5 | 8.9 | Historic US 66 east (Willow Street) | Northern end of Historic Route 66 concurrency |
| Normal | 7.2 | 11.6 | I-55 – Chicago, St. Louis | |
| | 8.9 | 14.3 | I-39 / US 51 – Rockford, Chicago, St. Louis | Northern terminus of US 51 Bus. |
1.000 mi = 1.609 km; 1.000 km = 0.621 mi: Concurrency terminus
