= Illinois Route 8 =

State highway in central Illinois, US

Illinois Route 8
- IL 8 highlighted in red

Route information
- Maintained by IDOT
- Length: 45.51 mi (73.24 km)
- Existed: November 5, 1918–present

Major junctions
- West end: IL 97 in Maquon
- US 24 / IL 29 in East Peoria; I-74 in East Peoria; US 150 in East Peoria
- East end: US 24 / US 24 Bus. in Washington

Location
- Country: United States
- State: Illinois
- Counties: Knox, Peoria, Tazewell

Highway system
- Illinois State Highway System; Interstate; US; State; Tollways; Scenic
← IL 7	→ IL 9

Illinois Route 8 (IL 8) is an east–west state route in central Illinois. It runs east from Illinois Route 97 south of Maquon to the intersection of U.S. Route 24 (McClugage Avenue) and Business U.S. 24 near Washington. Illinois 8 is 45.51 miles (73.24 km) long.

== Route description ==
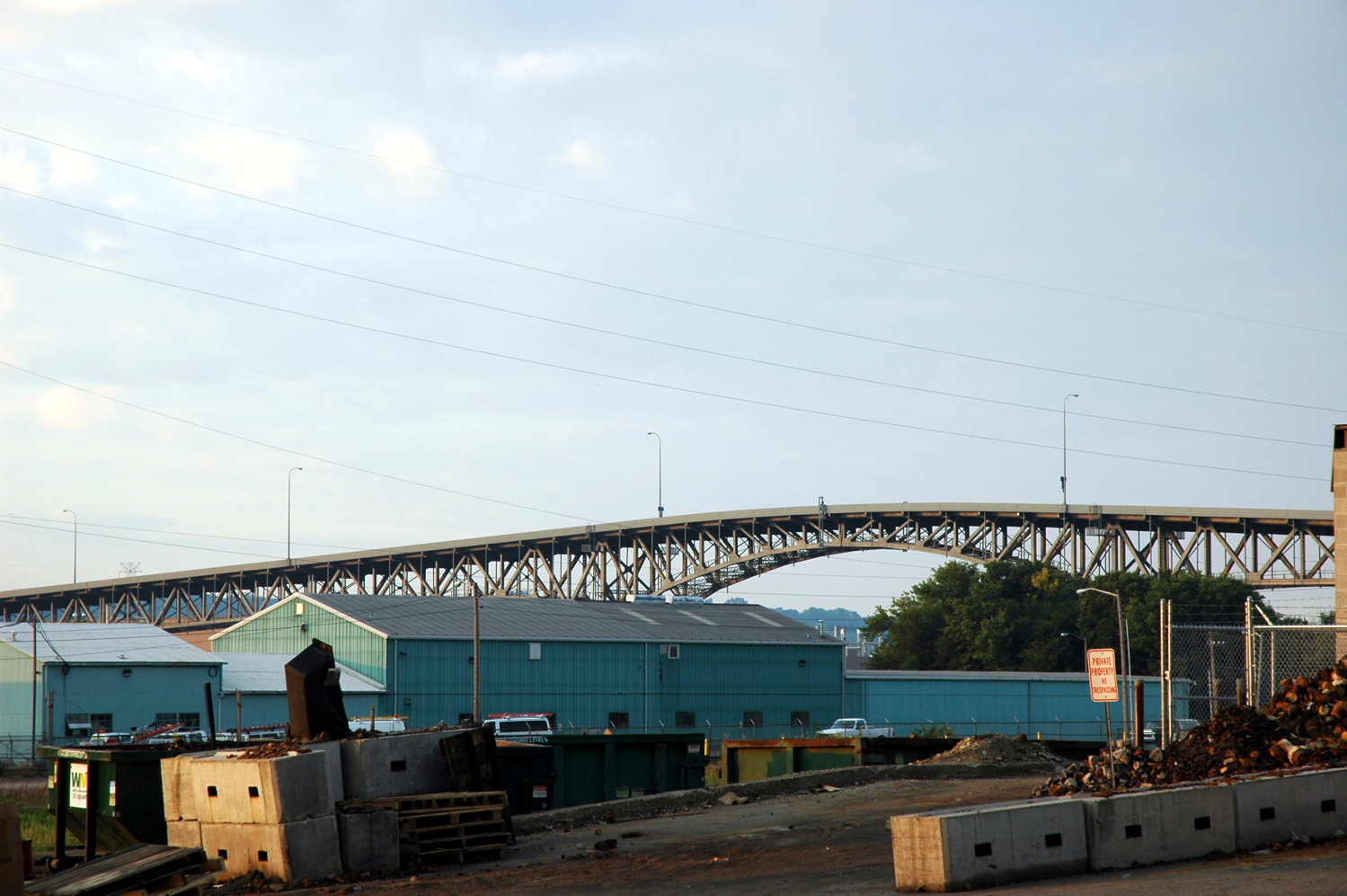
Cedar Street Bridge over the Illinois River in Peoria, Illinois

Illinois 8 largely parallels Interstate 74 from Maquon to Washington. After entering Peoria from the west, it crosses the Illinois River with Illinois Route 116 on the Cedar Street Bridge between Peoria and East Peoria. Illinois 8/116 stays joined until Camp Street, where U.S. Route 24 and Illinois Route 29/116 continue geographically northeast, and are signed east and north, respectively, with U.S. Route 150 westbound, forming a wrong-way concurrency. Illinois 8 turns east onto Camp Street with U.S. 150 eastbound. In spite of this concurrency, up until 2005 the eastbound I-74 exit to Camp Street was only marked for U.S. 150, while the next eastbound exit to Washington Street was marked as "To Illinois 8" even though Washington Street is unnumbered in East Peoria. At the Washington Street intersection, U.S. 150 leaves Illinois 8 and runs east-southeast towards Morton, while Illinois 8 runs east-northeast through unincorporated Sunnyland.

Near Washington, Illinois 8 turns westbound onto Business U.S. 24 (despite being signed as East Illinois 8) to terminate at U.S. 24.

== History ==
SBI Route 8 ran from Gulfport on U.S. Route 34 at the Iowa state line to Sheldon on U.S. Route 24 at the Indiana state line. It was truncated in 1965, with some of its segments moving to its modern alignment from Illinois Routes 78 and 116

West Farmington Road from Illinois Route 116 (West Plank Road) through West Peoria to Illinois Route 8 (West Southport Road) was marked as "Spur-IL-8" until 1970. This was a popular route to Bradley University area (West Main Street, North University Drive). Today, the route is marked as Farmington Road and not numbered.

== Major intersections ==
County	Location	mi	km	Destinations	Notes
Knox		0.0	0.0	IL 97	
Knox		8.4	13.5	IL 78 south	West end of IL 78 overlap
Peoria	Elmwood	10.6	17.1	IL 78 north	East end of IL 78 overlap
Peoria	Peoria	32.4	52.1	IL 116 west (Howett Street, Lincoln Avenue)	West end of IL 116 overlap
Illinois River		33.7	54.2	Cedar Street Bridge	
Tazewell	East Peoria	34.5	55.5	Edmund Street	Interchange
Tazewell	East Peoria	35.0	56.3	US 24 west / IL 29 south	Interchange; west end of US 24 overlap / IL 29 overlap
Tazewell	East Peoria	35.7	57.5	US 24 east / US 150 west / IL 29 north / IL 116 east (North Main Street) / Ronald Reagan Trail	East end of US 24 / IL 29 / IL 116 overlap; west end of US 150 / Ronald Reagan Trail overlap
Tazewell	East Peoria	36.1	58.1	I-74 west – Peoria	Eastbound exit and westbound entrance; I-74 east exit 95B
Tazewell	East Peoria	36.7	59.1	East Washington Street to I-74	
Tazewell	East Peoria	36.6	58.9	US 150 east (Meadows Avenue)	East end of US 150 overlap
Tazewell	Washington	44.3	71.3	US 24 Bus. east (Washington Road) / Ronald Reagan Trail	West end of US 24 Bus. overlap; east end of Ronald Reagan Trail overlap
Tazewell		45.51	73.24	US 24 – Eureka, Peoria	East end of US 24 Bus. overlap
1.000 mi = 1.609 km; 1.000 km = 0.621 mi: Concurrency terminus; Incomplete access
