= Murray Baker Bridge =

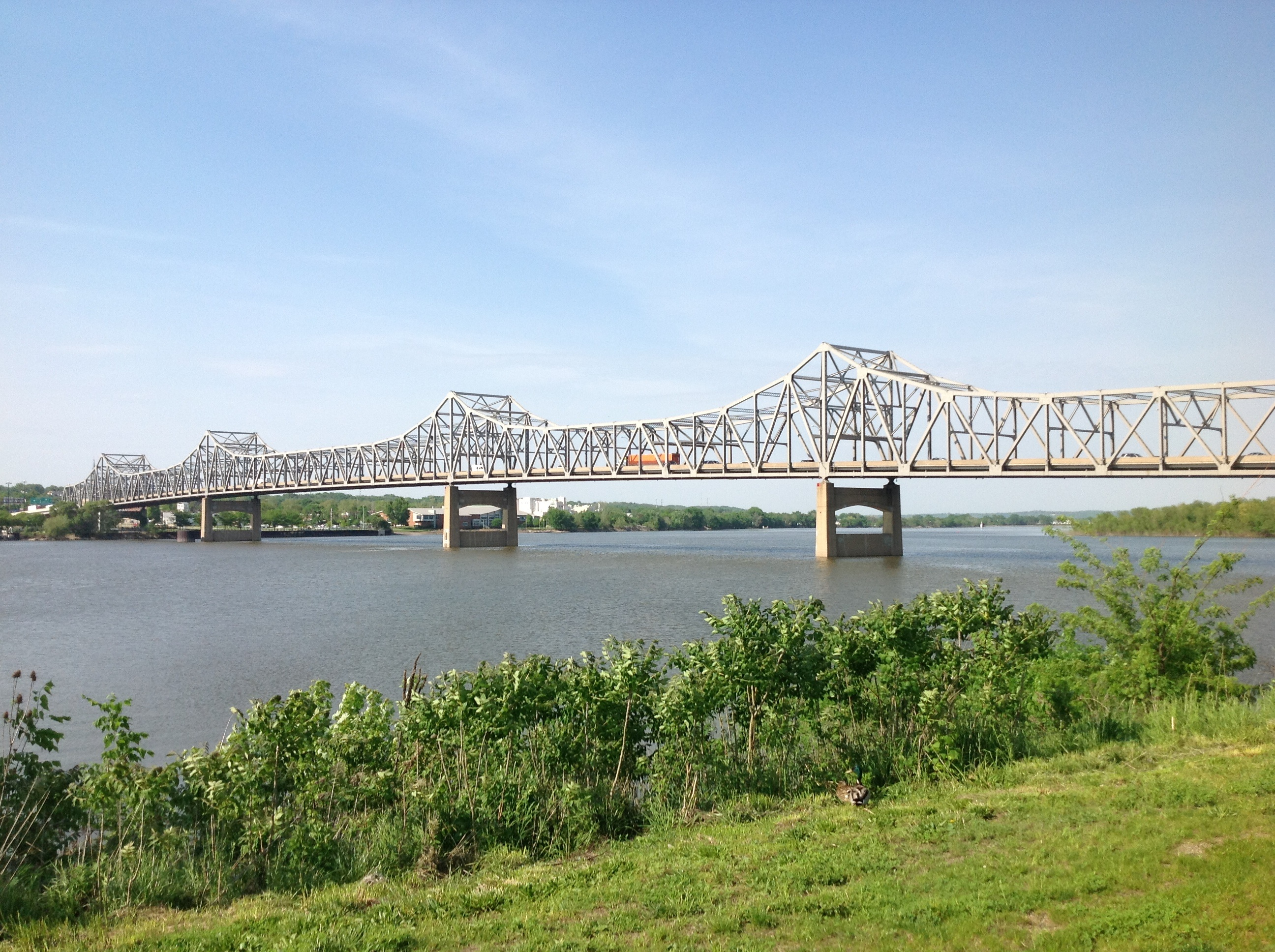
- Murray Baker Bridge from riverside in East Peoria.
- Coordinates: 40°41′16″N 89°35′00″W
- Carries: 4 lanes of I-74 / IL 29
- Crosses: Illinois River
- Locale: Peoria, Illinois and East Peoria, Illinois
- Maintained by: Illinois Department of Transportation
- ID number: 000090000119656

Characteristics
- Design: Cantilever bridge
- Total length: Original: 3,216 feet (980 m); Current: 3,036 feet (925 m)
- Longest span: 182 meters (597 ft)
- Load limit: 52.2 metric tons
- Clearance above: 14.4 feet (4.4 m)
- Clearance below: 48.9 feet (14.9 m)

History
- Opened: 1958
- Rebuilt: 2005, 2020

Statistics
- Daily traffic: 68,000

The Murray Baker Bridge is a landmark cantilever bridge that carries Interstate 74 (I-74) and Illinois Route 29 (IL 29) over the Illinois River from downtown Peoria to East Peoria in central Illinois. According to the Illinois Department of Transportation, the Murray Baker Bridge was built in 1958, and had an original length of 3,216 feet (980 m).

The bridge itself is a single cantilever bridge, with two lanes in each direction. Because it has no shoulders, the Baker Bridge is not up to modern Interstate standards.

The bridge is named for Murray M. Baker, who was the first vice president of the company that eventually became Caterpillar. Baker convinced the Holt Manufacturing Company to move to Peoria in 1909. Holt merged with C.L. Best Gas Tractor Co. and became Caterpillar in 1925.

== History ==
The bridge underwent repairs in 1984.

As part of the Upgrade 74 reconstruction project in 2005, the span's length was shortened to 3,036 feet (925 m) to make room for new entrance ramps on the west side of the river. On January 3, 2006, the Illinois Department of Transportation and the chief design consultant for the truss shortening, Alfred Benesch & Company, were awarded the 2006 Eminent Conceptor Award by the American Council of Engineering Companies of Illinois (ACEC-IL). The project was picked out of a larger group of Honor Award recipients. The designer was also awarded the 2007 Prize Bridge Award by the National Steel Bridge Alliance (NSBA).

The bridge was closed for construction on March 29, 2020. By removing traffic from the work zone, the repairs were completed in just one construction season, reducing the overall project cost and eliminating a safety risk to workers and motorists.

Following extensive renovations, the Murray Baker Bridge rehabilitation was completed on schedule and reopened to the public on October 31, 2020. The project, one of the first under Governor Pritzker's historic, bipartisan Rebuild Illinois capital program, improved the critical travel corridor by closing the work zone to all traffic for seven months instead of multiple construction seasons.

The $42.2 million rehabilitation project removed and replaced the existing bridge deck, repaired structural steel, repainted lower portions of the bridge and installed new lighting, resulting in a smoother, safer ride for commuter and freight traffic. As part of a joint effort with the City of Peoria, energy-efficient decorative lighting was added to enhance a community focal point. The Murray Baker Bridge carries almost 68,000 vehicles a day.

== Photographs ==
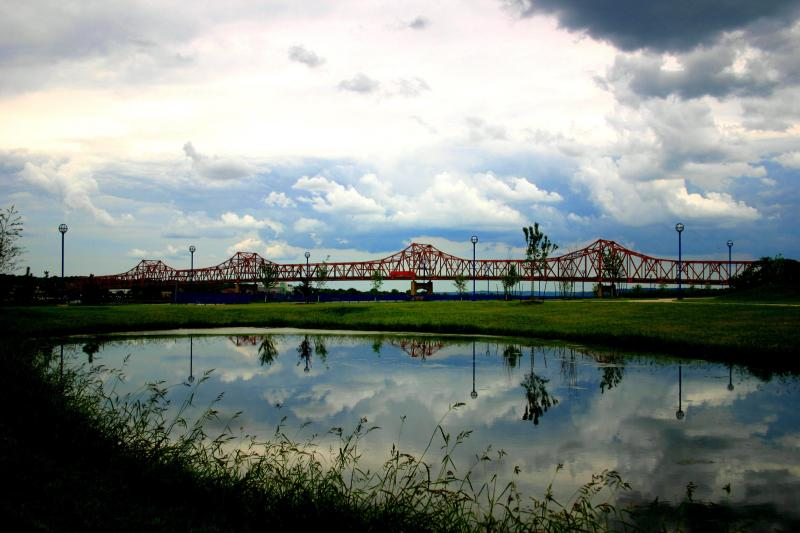
From East Peoria

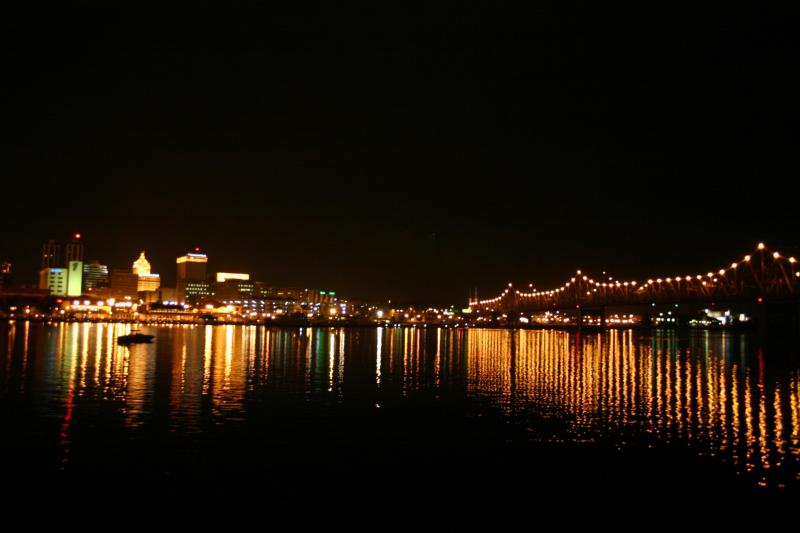
Peoria downtown skyline at night
