= Alpha, Illinois =

Alpha
- Village
- Etymology: The first letter of the Greek alphabet
- Interactive map of Alpha
- Coordinates: 41°11′30″N 90°22′50″W
- Country: United States
- State: Illinois
- County: Henry

Area
  - Total: 0.31 sq mi (0.81 km^{2})
  - Land: 0.31 sq mi (0.81 km^{2})
  - Water: 0 sq mi (0.00 km^{2})
- Elevation: 804 ft (245 m)

Population (2020)
  - Total: 675
  - Density: 2,171.3/sq mi (838.33/km^{2})
- Time zone: UTC-6 (CST)
  - Summer (DST): UTC-5 (CDT)
- ZIP code: 61413
- Area code: 309
- FIPS code: 17-00971
- GNIS feature ID: 2397943
- Website: villageofalpha.org

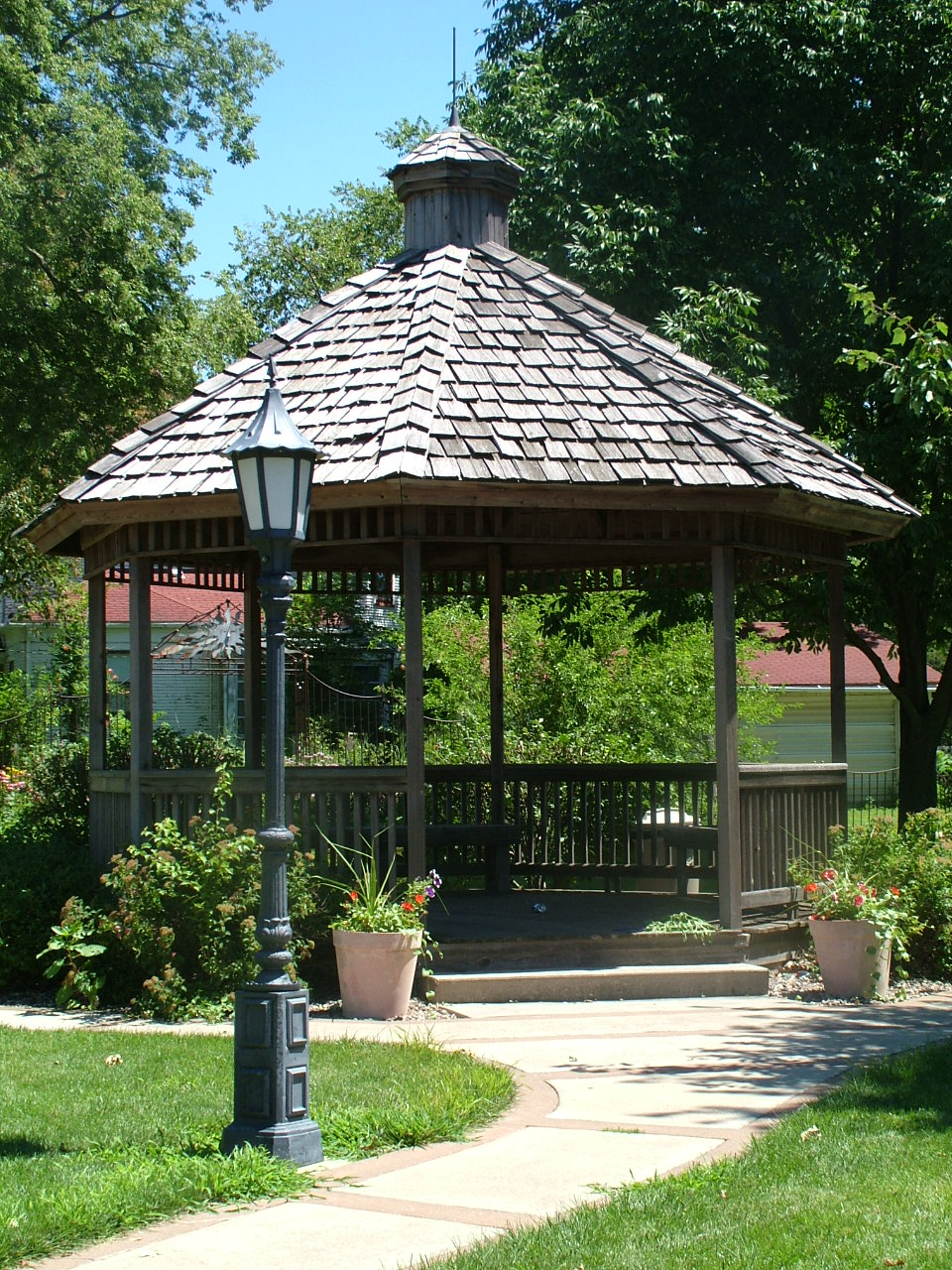
The Alpha Gazebo, at the intersection of US 150 and D Street.

Alpha is a village in southwest Henry County, Illinois, United States. The population was 675 at the 2020 census, up from 671 in 2010.

== History ==
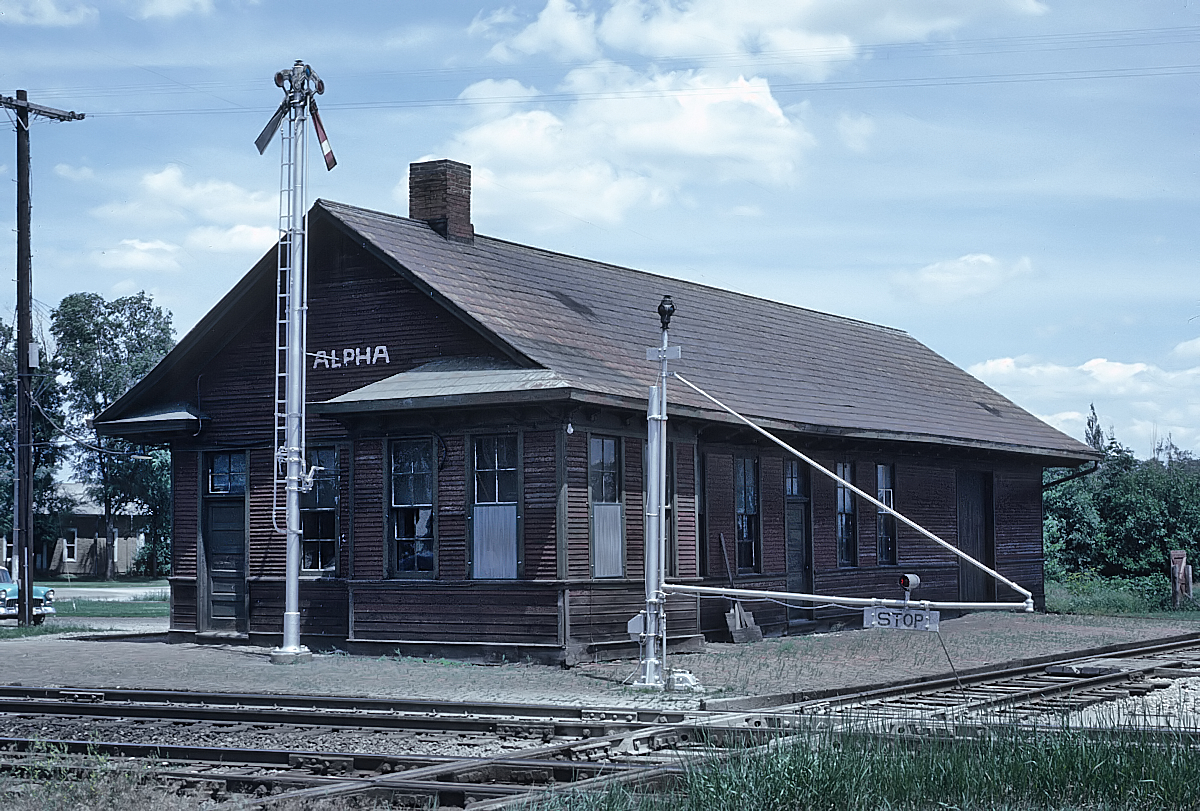
The Alpha CB&Q station in 1966, since razed

On June 1, 1872, Anson Calkins laid out the village of Alpha. Alpha was created as a railroad town and replaced the town of Oxford, which was located about three miles west of current day Alpha. It was located at the junction between two lines of the Chicago, Burlington, and Quincy Railroad, and a since-razed depot was located at the junction. The north–south branch between Galesburg and Savanna crossed an east–west branch between Galva and New Boston. The east–west line has been abandoned and the north–south line is in operation as the BNSF Barstow Subdivision. The village was named Alpha (the first letter of the Greek alphabet), because Calkins believed it to be the beginnings of a great city. It was incorporated on January 11, 1895.

== Geography ==
According to the 2021 census gazetteer files, Alpha has a total area of 0.31 square miles (0.80 km^{2}), all land.

== Demographics ==
Historical population
| Census | Pop. | Note | %± |
|---|---|---|---|
| 1900 | 355 | | — |
| 1910 | 358 | | 0.8% |
| 1920 | 281 | | −21.5% |
| 1930 | 403 | | 43.4% |
| 1940 | 553 | | 37.2% |
| 1950 | 630 | | 13.9% |
| 1960 | 637 | | 1.1% |
| 1970 | 771 | | 21.0% |
| 1980 | 815 | | 5.7% |
| 1990 | 753 | | −7.6% |
| 2000 | 726 | | −3.6% |
| 2010 | 671 | | −7.6% |
| 2020 | 675 | | 0.6% |
U.S. Decennial Census

As of the 2020 census there were 675 people, 273 households, and 206 families residing in the village. The population density was 2,170.42 inhabitants per square mile (838.00/km^{2}). There were 302 housing units at an average density of 971.06 per square mile (374.93/km^{2}). The racial makeup of the village was 95.56% White, 0.74% African American, 0.00% Native American, 0.15% Asian, 0.00% Pacific Islander, 0.00% from other races, and 3.56% from two or more races. Hispanic or Latino of any race were 2.67% of the population.

There were 273 households, out of which 41.0% had children under the age of 18 living with them, 64.47% were married couples living together, 5.86% had a female householder with no husband present, and 24.54% were non-families. 23.08% of all households were made up of individuals, and 8.79% had someone living alone who was 65 years of age or older. The average household size was 2.86 and the average family size was 2.47.

The village's age distribution consisted of 28.9% under the age of 18, 2.7% from 18 to 24, 29.1% from 25 to 44, 21.1% from 45 to 64, and 18.2% who were 65 years of age or older. The median age was 40.2 years. For every 100 females, there were 126.2 males. For every 100 females age 18 and over, there were 153.4 males.

The median income for a household in the village was $67,813, and the median income for a family was $77,500. Males had a median income of $50,250 versus $31,429 for females. The per capita income for the village was $30,993. About 4.9% of families and 9.4% of the population were below the poverty line, including 18.0% of those under age 18 and 0.8% of those age 65 or over.

== Education ==
It is in the Alwood Community Unit School District 225.
