= Interstate 474 =

Highway in Illinois

Interstate 474
- I-474 highlighted in red

Route information
- Auxiliary route of I-74
- Maintained by IDOT
- Length: 14.88 mi (23.95 km)
- Existed: 1979–present
- NHS: Entire route

Major junctions
- West end: I-74 / IL 6 in Peoria
- US 24 at the Bartonville–Peoria line US 24 / IL 29 in Creve Coeur
- East end: I-74 in East Peoria

Location
- Country: United States
- State: Illinois
- Counties: Peoria, Tazewell

Highway system
- Interstate Highway System; Main; Auxiliary; Suffixed; Business; Future; Illinois State Highway System; Interstate; US; State; Tollways; Scenic
← IL 394	→ I-490

Interstate 474 (I-474) is an Interstate Highway loop route that provides a southwestern bypass around the north-central Illinois city of Peoria. I-474's parent Interstate is I-74. As the first digit of the Interstate's number is even, it follows the established convention of providing a loop around a city. I-474 is 14.88 miles (23.95 km) long. I-474 is currently the highest numbered route in the state of Illinois, but will be surpassed by I-490 when that road is completed in 2027. It is also, excluding the proposed I-274 in North Carolina, the only auxiliary route of I-74.

== Route description ==
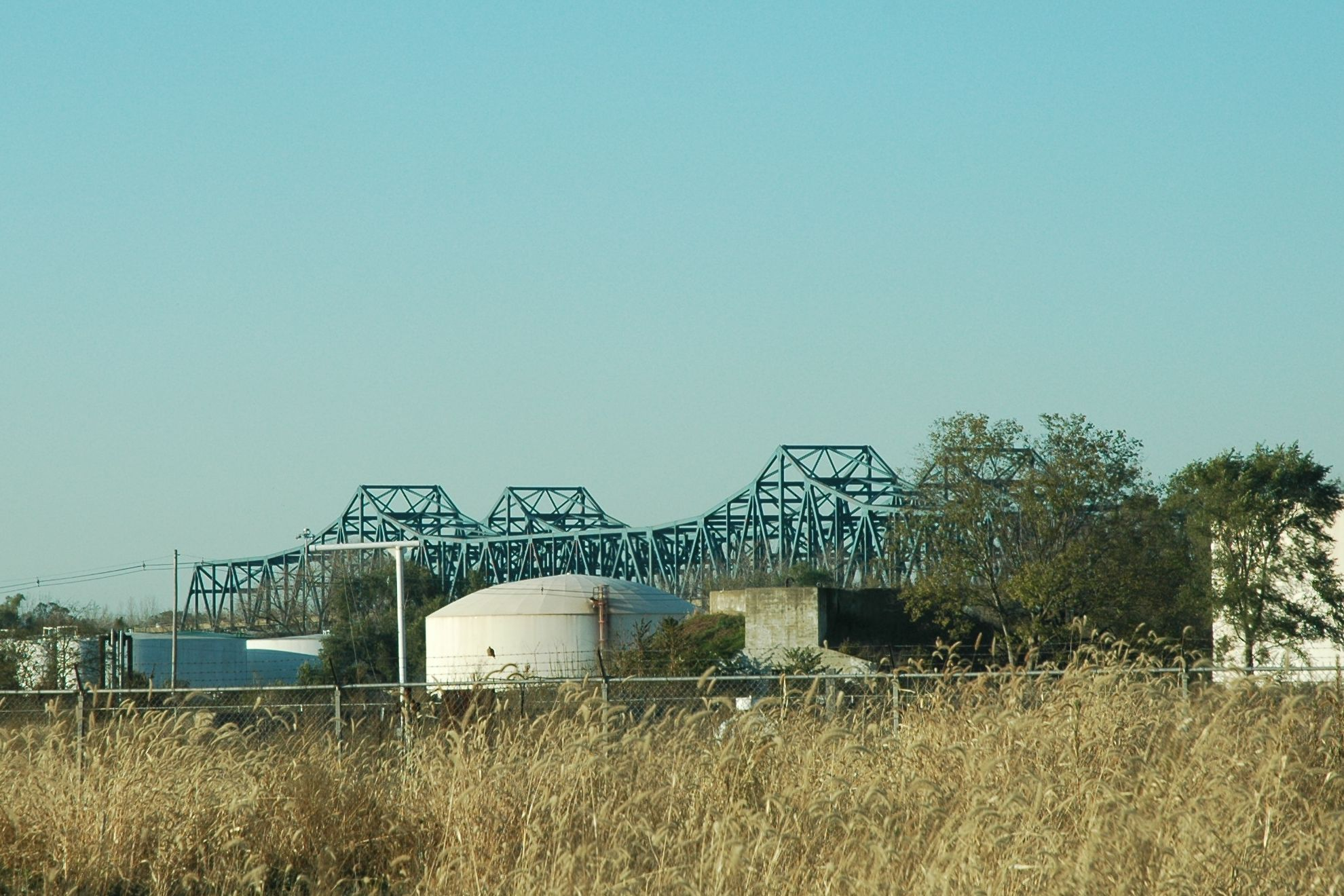
Shade–Lohmann Bridge from the southeast

I-474 is a modern, Interstate-standard four-lane freeway for its entire length. Prior to 2006, through truck traffic on I-74 was instructed to use I-474. This is because prior to its 2004–2007 reconstruction, I-74 was significantly below Interstate standard, having numerous 15-mile-per-hour (24 km/h) on- and offramps, extremely short merging space for onramps (some less than 500 feet (150 m) in length), and a 50-mile-per-hour (80 km/h) speed limit through downtown Peoria.

The Illinois Route 116 (IL 116) access interchange at Maxwell Road has been indicated as the eastern terminus for the Quincy to Peoria expressway now known as the IL 336 project.

The western terminus of I-474 is at I-74 exit 87A. The eastern terminus of I-474 is at I-74 exit 99. North of the western terminus, the road continues as IL 6 with a new series of exit numbers.

== History ==
I-474 was constructed through the mid-1970s. The now-named Shade–Lohmann Bridge was erected in 1973. During that year, $30.1 million (equivalent to $162 million in 2024) was allocated for acquisition of right-of-way, grading work, and overpass/bridge construction across the whole length of the highway.

== Exit list ==
County	Location	mi	km	Exit	Destinations	Notes
Peoria		0.00	0.00		IL 6 north – Chillicothe	Continuation north beyond I-74
Peoria		0.00	0.00	0	I-74 – Peoria, Moline, Rock Island	Western terminus; signed as exits 0A (east) and 0B (west); I-74 exit 87A
Peoria	Bellevue	3.78	6.08	3A	To IL 116 – Farmington	
Peoria		5.34	8.59	5	CR R49 (Airport Road)	Serves Peoria International Airport
Peoria	Bartonville–Peoria line	7.09	11.41	6	US 24 west (Adams Street) – Bartonville	West end of US 24 overlap; signed as exits 6A (US 24 west) & 6B (Adams Street) westbound
Illinois River		8.83– 9.04	14.21– 14.55	Shade–Lohmann Bridge		
Tazewell	Creve Coeur	9.57	15.40	9	US 24 east / IL 29 – East Peoria, Pekin	East end of US 24 overlap
Tazewell	East Peoria	14.88	23.95	15	I-74 to I-155 south – Peoria, Indianapolis, Lincoln	Eastbound exit and westbound entrance; eastern terminus and signed as exit 15 (west); I-74 exit 99
1.000 mi = 1.609 km; 1.000 km = 0.621 mi: Concurrency terminus; Incomplete access
