= McClugage Bridge =

Twin bridge over the Illinois River in Illinois, United States

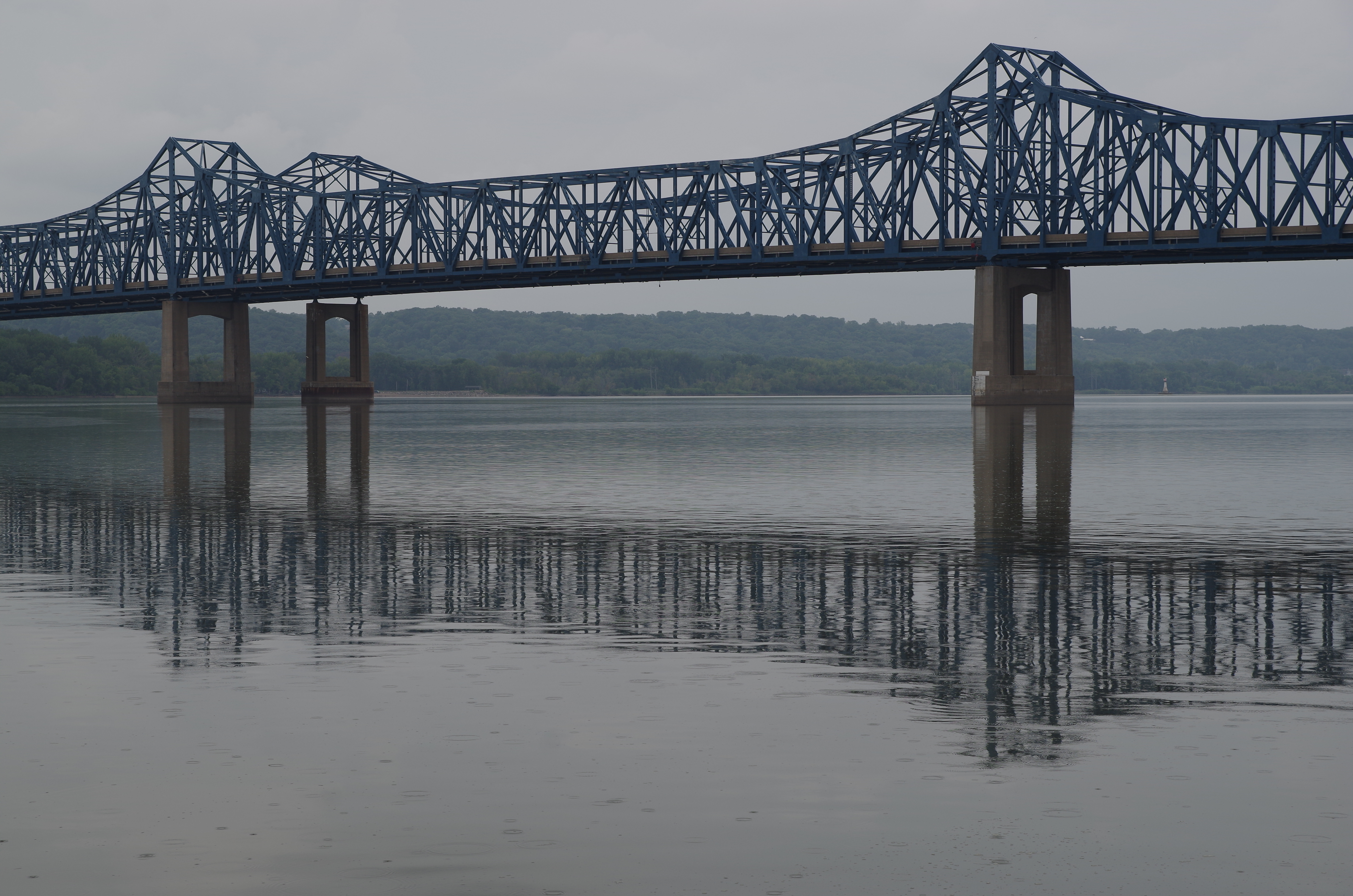
- McClugage Bridge from the west side of the Illinois River; 1982 span in foreground, 1948 span in background
- Coordinates: 40°43′12″N 89°32′45″W
- Carries: 5 lanes (3 WB, 2 EB) of US 150
- Crosses: Illinois River
- Locale: Peoria, Illinois
- Official name: McClugage Bridge
- Maintained by: Illinois Department of Transportation
- ID number: WB: 000090011505461; Old EB: 000090007019729

Characteristics
- Design: Dual cantilever bridges
- Total length: 4,745.1 ft (1446.3 m)
- Width: WB: 39.0 ft (11.9 m); Old EB: 28.9 ft (8.8 m)
- Longest span: 190 m
- Load limit: WB: 77.2 metric tons Old EB: 55.8 metric tons
- Clearance below: 14.9 m

History
- Opened: Upper Free Bridge:1885: Original bicemential, later converted into eastbound: 1948; Westbound: 1982; Current eastbound: 2024
- Rebuilt: Original eastbound: 2000 westbound: 2020s
- Closed: Upper Free Bridge: 1948; Original eastbound: 2024

Statistics
- Daily traffic: 30,000 (combined, As of 2021)

Location
- Interactive map of McClugage Bridge

The McClugage Bridge carries U.S. Route 150 over Upper Peoria Lake and Peoria Lake in the Illinois River in the US state of Illinois. Originally opened in 1948, the crossing has had two physical structures since 1982, one carrying westbound traffic and one carrying eastbound traffic.

The bridge's official name honors David H. McClugage, mayor of Peoria from 1937 to 1941.

== History ==
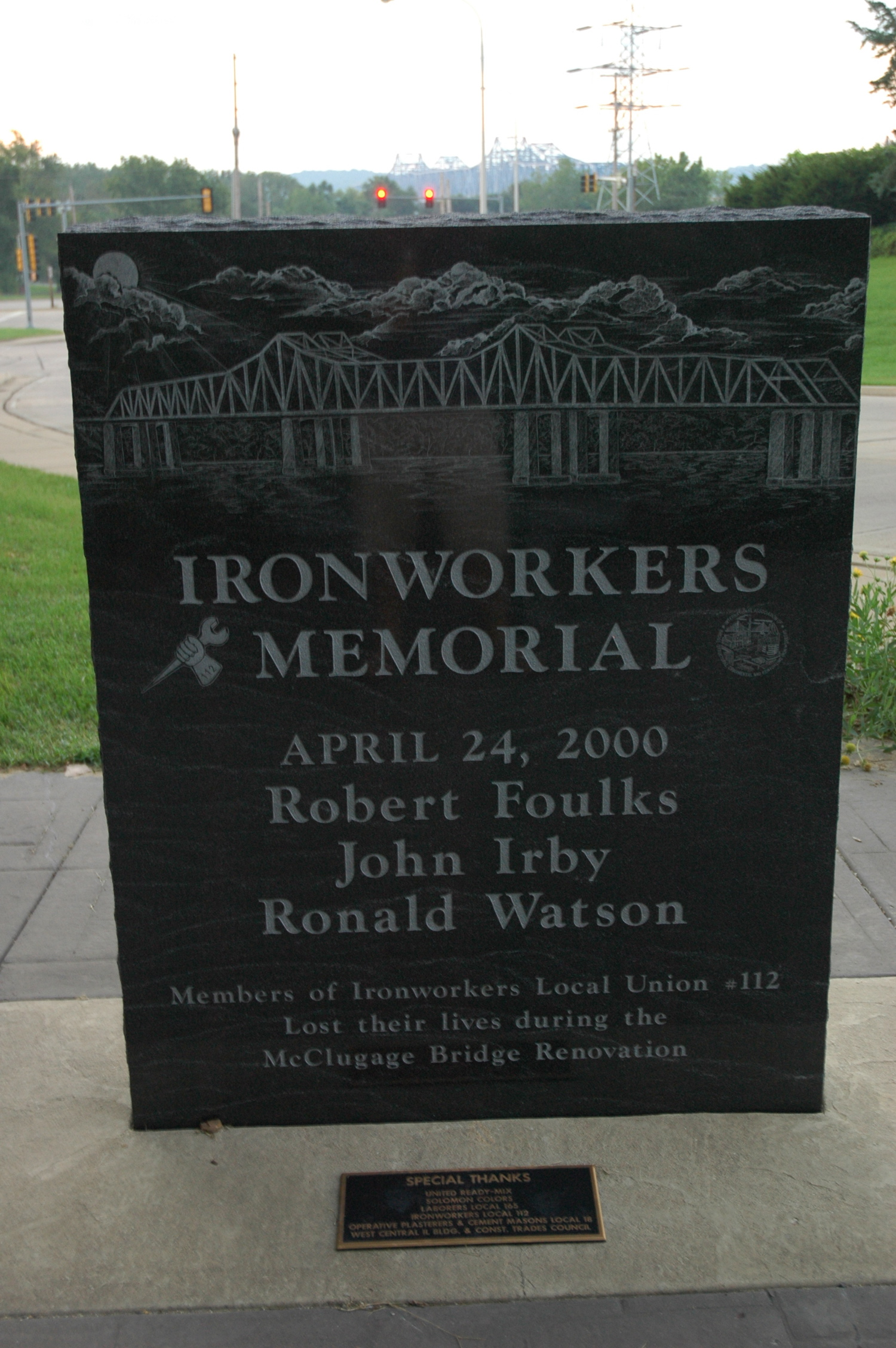
Ironworkers Memorial, located near Grand View Drive

In 1888, work began on the Ipper Free Bridge, the original bridge on the site. it was competed and opened to traffic in 1888.

In 1939, work began to build a replacement cantilever truss bridge south of the old Upper Free Bridge. The Upper Free Bridge closed permanently in 1943, and was demolished in 1947. The new bridge known as the McClugage Bridge, completed in 1948.

As part of a freeway realignment project, work was competed in 1964 on a project which rebuilt the bridges to have new approaches connecting to US 52.

In 1978, work began on an additional three-lane span of similar style, immediately north of the existing bridge. After work was competed in 1982, the northern span has carried westbound traffic, and the original southern two-lane span carried only eastbound traffic.

The eastbound span was rehabilitated and both the eastbound and westbound spans approaches were reconstructed from 1997 to 2000, leaving a stub ramp with the westbound span. During the work, an accident in 2000 killed three iron workers when scaffolding on the bridge collapsed 62 feet (19 m) into the river. Due to this tragedy, there was an effort to change the name of the bridge to "Ironworkers Memorial Bridge". However, instead of the name change, the iron workers were memorialized by a monument on Lorentz Avenue near the bridge that was dedicated in April 2001.

In 2019, construction began on replacing the deteriorated eastbound, original span with a three-lane wide tied-arch bridge, along with a multi-use path on the right side. The new bridge will also include a protected bike lane and pedestrian path. After the $167 million eastbound bridge is complete, a $54.8 million rehabilitation of the westbound 1982 bridge will follow. The new bridge, originally slated to be completed by the fall of 2023, was re-scheduled to open in 2024. The new eastbound span opened to road traffic in the early morning hours of December 19, 2024. Completion of the multiuse path, and demolition of the 1948 span began shortly afterwards. Demolition of the old eastbound span, down through ten explosive blades over the course of 2024, was competed in September 2025, and work to rehabilitate the westbound span began at the same time, it is excepted to be competed in 2028.
