= Kickapoo, Illinois =

- Unincorporated community
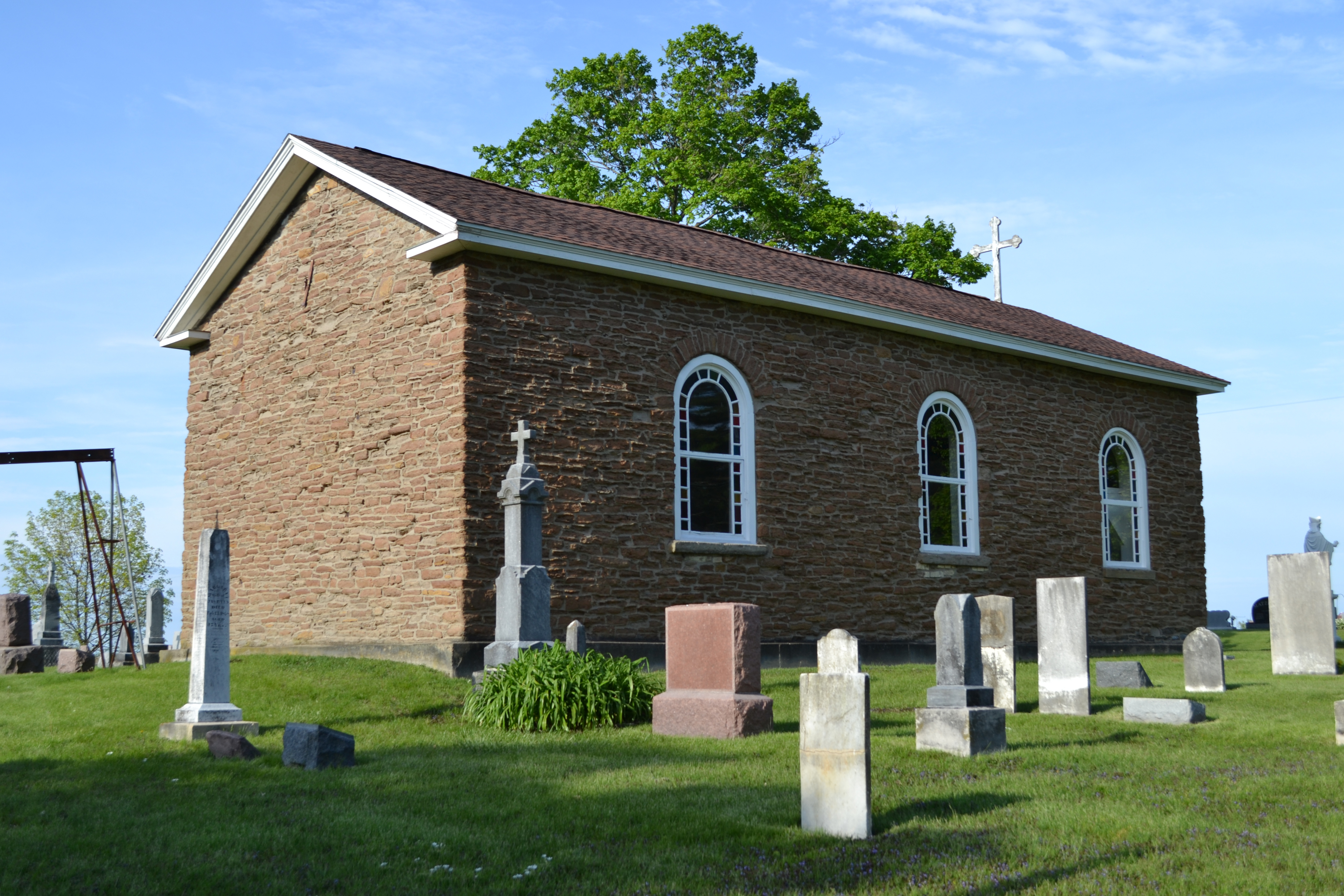
- Saint Patrick's Cemetery in Kickapoo

- Location within Illinois Location within the United States
- Coordinates: 40°47′24″N 89°45′04″W
- Country: United States
- State: Illinois
- County: Peoria
- Elevation: 663 ft (202 m)
- Time zone: UTC-6 (Central (CST))
  - Summer (DST): UTC-5 (CDT)
- Area code: 309
- GNIS feature ID: 411445

Kickapoo is an unincorporated community in Kickapoo Township, Peoria County, Illinois, United States. Kickapoo is located on U.S. Route 150, 10.8 miles (17.4 km) northwest of downtown Peoria.

It was named after the Kickapoo people.
