= Empire Township, McLean County, Illinois =

Coordinates: 40°20′41″N 88°45′01″W

Empire Township
- Township
- Location in McLean County

- McLean County's location in Illinois
- Country: United States
- State: Illinois
- County: McLean
- Established: May 17, 1858

Government
  - Supervisor: Linda McLaughlin

Area
  - Total: 49.41 sq mi (128.0 km^{2})
  - Land: 49.36 sq mi (127.8 km^{2})
  - Water: 0.05 sq mi (0.13 km^{2}) 0.10%

Population (2010)
  - Estimate (2016): 4,078
  - Density: 82.9/sq mi (32.0/km^{2})
- Time zone: UTC-6 (CST)
  - Summer (DST): UTC-5 (CDT)
- FIPS code: 17-113-24140

Empire Township is located in McLean County, Illinois. As of the 2010 census, its population was 4,093 and it contained 1,719 housing units. Empire Township changed its name from Le Roy Township on May 17, 1858.

== Geography ==
According to the 2010 census, the township has a total area of 49.41 square miles (128.0 km^{2}), of which 49.36 square miles (127.8 km^{2}) (or 99.90%) is land and 0.05 square miles (0.13 km^{2}) (or 0.10%) is water.

== Demographics ==
Historical population
Census	Pop.	Note	%±
2016 (est.)	4,078
U.S. Decennial Census
