= Tilton, Illinois =

Tilton
- Village
- Location of Tilton in Vermilion County, Illinois.

- Tilton's location in Vermilion County
- Coordinates: 40°05′21″N 87°37′53″W
- Country: United States
- State: Illinois
- County: Vermilion
- Township: Danville

Area
  - Total: 3.24 sq mi (8.39 km^{2})
  - Land: 3.21 sq mi (8.31 km^{2})
  - Water: 0.031 sq mi (0.08 km^{2}) 0.93%
- Elevation: 646 ft (197 m)

Population (2020)
  - Total: 2,660
  - Density: 805.8/sq mi (311.13/km^{2})
- Time zone: UTC-6 (CST)
  - Summer (DST): UTC-5 (CDT)
- ZIP code: 61833
- Area code: 217
- FIPS code: 17-75276
- GNIS feature ID: 2399982
- Website: http://www.tiltonil.com/

Tilton is a village in Danville Township, Vermilion County, Illinois, United States. It is part of the Danville, Illinois Metropolitan Statistical Area. The population was 2,976 at the 2000 census, down to 2,724 in 2010 and down to 2,660 in 2020.

It is named after Lucian Tilton, a friend of Abraham Lincoln, who worked for the railroads. Lincoln reputedly had Thanksgiving dinner at Tilton's house in the village in the 1850s.

== Geography ==
According to the 2010 census, Tilton has a total area of 3.243 square miles (8.40 km^{2}), of which 3.21 square miles (8.31 km^{2}) (or 98.98%) is land and 0.033 square miles (0.09 km^{2}) (or 1.02%) is water.

== Demographics ==
Historical population
Census	Pop.	Note	%±
1880	297		—
1890	474		59.6%
1900	474		0.0%
1910	710		49.8%
1920	909		28.0%
1930	1,394		53.4%
1940	1,486		6.6%
1950	1,638		10.2%
1960	2,598		58.6%
1970	2,544		−2.1%
1980	2,405		−5.5%
1990	2,729		13.5%
2000	2,976		9.1%
2010	2,724		−8.5%
2020	2,660		−2.3%
U.S. Decennial Census

=== 2020 census ===
As of the 2020 census, Tilton had a population of 2,660. The median age was 49.1 years. 18.4% of residents were under the age of 18 and 25.9% of residents were 65 years of age or older. For every 100 females there were 88.1 males, and for every 100 females age 18 and over there were 86.7 males age 18 and over.

93.9% of residents lived in urban areas, while 6.1% lived in rural areas.

There were 1,214 households in Tilton, of which 22.5% had children under the age of 18 living in them. Of all households, 35.7% were married-couple households, 20.2% were households with a male householder and no spouse or partner present, and 34.8% were households with a female householder and no spouse or partner present. About 38.6% of all households were made up of individuals and 19.8% had someone living alone who was 65 years of age or older.

There were 1,333 housing units, of which 8.9% were vacant. The homeowner vacancy rate was 2.3% and the rental vacancy rate was 8.6%.

Racial composition as of the 2020 census
Race	Number	Percent
White	2,436	91.6%
Black or African American	45	1.7%
American Indian and Alaska Native	9	0.3%
Asian	6	0.2%
Native Hawaiian and Other Pacific Islander	0	0.0%
Some other race	23	0.9%
Two or more races	141	5.3%
Hispanic or Latino (of any race)	77	2.9%

=== 2000 census ===
As of the census of 2000, there were 2,976 people, 1,322 households, and 823 families residing in the village. The population density was 960.5 people per square mile (370.7/km^{2}). There were 1,412 housing units at an average density of 455.7 per square mile (175.9/km^{2}). The racial makeup of the village was 98.29% White, 0.17% African American, 0.10% Native American, 0.07% Asian, 0.34% from other races, and 1.04% from two or more races. Hispanic or Latino of any race were 1.08% of the population.

There were 1,322 households out of which 23.8% had children under the age of 18 living with them, 47.4% were married couples living together, 11.3% had a female householder with no husband present, and 37.7% were non-families. 32.7% of all households were made up of individuals and 14.2% had someone living alone who was 65 years of age or older. The average household size was 2.25 and the average family size was 2.83.

In the village, the population was spread out with 22.0% under the age of 18, 8.1% from 18 to 24, 25.0% from 25 to 44, 26.9% from 45 to 64, and 18.0% who were 65 years of age or older. The median age was 41 years. For every 100 females, there were 88.2 males. For every 100 females age 18 and over, there were 86.8 males.

The median income for a household in the village was $31,810, and the median income for a family was $37,727. Males had a median income of $35,455 versus $20,988 for females. The per capita income for the village was $16,276. About 6.2% of families and 8.6% of the population were below the poverty line, including 6.7% of those under age 18 and 8.3% of those age 65 or over.

== Transportation ==
Danville Mass Transit provides bus service on Routes 9 and 13 connecting Tilton to downtown Danville and other destinations.

== Education ==
Most of it is in the Danville Community Consolidated School District 118. A piece is in the Westville Community Unit School District 2

The comprehensive high school of the former district is Danville High School, and the comprehensive public high school of the latter is Westville High School.

== Notable people ==
- Bert Graham: infielder with the St Louis Browns
- Joseph Kirkland: journalist and novelist
- Russ Meers: pitcher for the Chicago Cubs

== Mayors ==
- 1949-1957 - Carl Gruber
- 1957-1963 - Donald Fitzsimmons
- 1963-1964 - William West
- 1964-1973 - Elmer Nabors
- 1973-1993 - Herschel Jones
- 1993-2001 - Conrad "Dutch" Wantland
- 2001-2023 - David Phillips
- 2023-Now - William "Billy" Wear Jr.

== Police Chiefs ==
- 1970-2001: Charles Wolfe (Retired)
- 2001-2009: Michael Schull Sr. (Retired)
- 2009-2017: Steven Cornett (Retired)
- 2017-2022: David Cornett (Retired)
- 2022–present: Phillip Bernardi
