= Bob Michel Bridge =

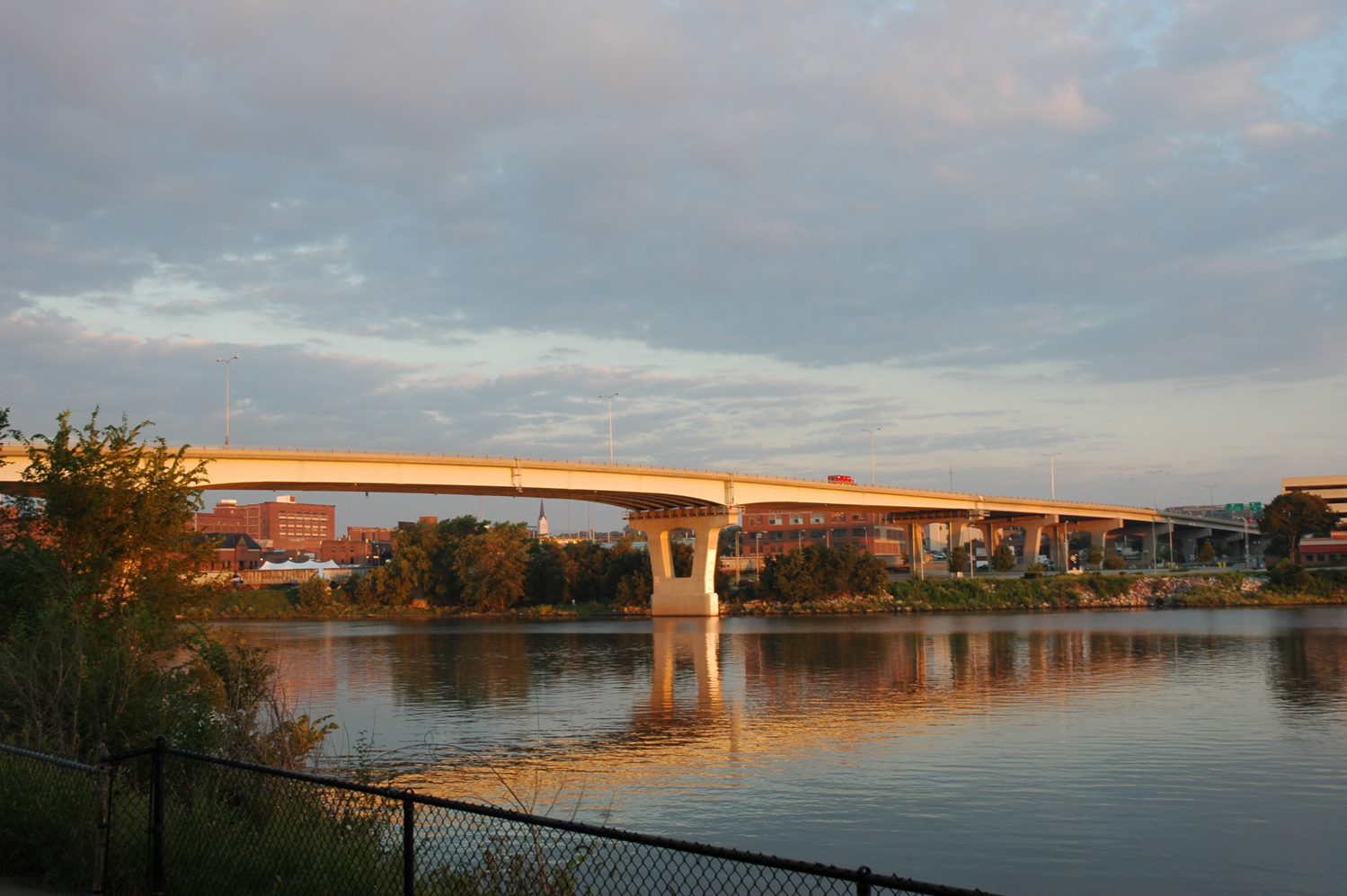
- Bob Michel Bridge over the Illinois River in Peoria, Illinois
- Coordinates: 40.684511°N 89.591886°W
- Carries: 4 lanes of ILL 40, sidewalk
- Crosses: Illinois River
- Locale: Peoria, Illinois and East Peoria, Illinois
- Official name: Robert Michel Bridge
- Maintained by: Illinois Department of Transportation
- ID number: 000090012230539

Characteristics
- Design: Steel girder
- Total length: 2,365 ft (720.9 m)
- Width: 62.0 ft (18.9 m)
- Load limit: 44.1 metric tons
- Clearance below: 65.9 ft (20.1 m)

History
- Construction cost: $60 million
- Opened: 1993
- Replaces: Franklin Street Bridge

Statistics
- Daily traffic: 18,600

Location
- Interactive map of Bob Michel Bridge

The Bob Michel Bridge (formerly called Franklin Street Bridge) carries Illinois Route 40 over the Illinois River 0.75 miles (1.21 km) up-river from the Cedar Street Bridge. Illinois 40 terminates at an interchange with Interstate 74 just east of the bridge. The bridge serves as a direct surface route from a major commercial center in East Peoria to the Civic Center in downtown Peoria.

When it was completed in 1993, the Bob Michel Bridge replaced the antiquated Franklin Street Bridge, a bascule and truss bridge, which had been located on an adjacent site since 1913. Its replacement had been under discussion for decades. Consulting engineer Jacob A Harman produced a design in 1936 for a six lane bridge with on-ramps in downtown Peoria that would have linked Harrison Street to clover-leaf turns in East Peoria for Washington Street, US routes 124, 122 and 116 and the road to Pekin at a cost of $2.5 million.

The Bob Michel Bridge features a 14 foot wide protected path for safe bicycle and pedestrian river crossing, which was completed in late 2023 as part of a $24.6 million IDOT rehabilitation project.

Prior to the development of the area as a commercial center, the Michel Bridge served a largely industrial area in East Peoria, including many buildings owned by nearby Caterpillar, Inc. The bridge was located at the end of an exit named "Industrial Spur". It has since been renamed to "Riverfront Drive" to account for the new commercial complex.

The Bob Michel Bridge is named after former Congressman Robert H. Michel, a Peoria-area Republican who served as a Congressman from 1957 to 1995 and as House Minority Leader from 1981 until his retirement.

The bridge is located at mile 162.3 of the Illinois River.
