= Melrose Township, Illinois =

Melrose Township, Illinois may refer to one of the following townships:

- Melrose Township, Adams County, Illinois
- Melrose Township, Clark County, Illinois

See also

- Melrose Township (disambiguation)
