= Illinois Central Electric Railway =

The Illinois Central Electric Railway (ICE) was an interurban line in Fulton County in western Illinois, west of Peoria.

The company was founded on October 9, 1903. The line ran from Lewistown north to Farmington with a branch from Norris to Fairview. The line opened as follows:

- 1909 Canton–Brereton–Norris
- 1910 Norris–Fairview
- 1911 Norris–Gilchrist–Maplewood–Farmington
- 1912 Lewistown–Bryant–St. David–Dunfermline–Canton

The railroad lost the competition to the automobile and was abandoned on July 25, 1928.
