= Marshall Site (Chillicothe, Illinois) =

Archaeological site in Illinois, United States

- U.S. National Register of Historic Places
- Location within Illinois
- Location: Marshall State Fish and Wildlife Area, Lacon Township, Marshall County, Illinois
- Nearest city: Chillicothe, Illinois
- Coordinates: 40°57′N 89°25.5′W
- MPS: Native American Rock Art Sites of Illinois MPS
- NRHP reference No.: 14000508
- Added to NRHP: August 25, 2014

The Marshall Site is an archaeological site in the Marshall State Fish and Wildlife Area in Marshall County, Illinois, across the Illinois River from Chillicothe. The site consists of a boulder carved with five petroglyphs. The petroglyphs, which archaeologists believe were created by Native Americans between 1673 and 1835, depict three anthropomorphs, an L-shaped figure, and a possible avimorph. The site was added to the National Register of Historic Places on August 25, 2014.

== Location ==
The petroglyphs are carved on a granite boulder located on a wooded hillside overlooking the eastern bank of the Illinois River. This section of the river lies in the central Illinois River Valley and is administered by the state of Illinois as the Marshall State Fish and Wildlife Area. The valley was formed during the Wisconsin glaciation, which is responsible for the cobbles and boulders left in the area. Compared to the northern Illinois River valley and Southern Illinois, the central Illinois River valley has relatively few large boulders or rock structures; this may explain why the petroglyphs were carved on a smaller boulder. The site was located by three area residents in 2011, who reported their discovery to archaeologists at the Dickson Mounds Museum.

== Description ==
The boulder consists of five petroglyphs, all carved on its top face: three anthropomorphs, an L-shaped figure, and a possible avimorph. All of the petroglyphs were carved with fine tools and consist of thin lines. The three anthropomorphs are arranged vertically; the largest is 12.25 centimetres (4.82 in) long, and each includes roughly 20-25 lines. Each figure consists of arms, legs, and a head extending from a V-shaped chest; the figures lack extremities, genitalia, or facial features. The L-shaped figure is formed by two sets of lines and is thought to depict a weapon such as a celt or axe. The avimorph consists of a set of straight lines intersecting a set of curved lines; while the former may signify a body and the latter wings, the figure is not detailed enough to conclusively state this.

According to Wagner et al., "The significance of the site lies in part in the fact that based on the method of manufacture it is possible that that the Marshall site petroglyphs were created by historic period (A.D. 1673–1835) Native American peoples."

== Origin ==
Wagner et al. proposed in 2013 that the petroglyphs were created by Native Americans in the Historic period (A.D. 1673–1835) The anthropomorphic imagery is consistent with other Native American art in the region, making it unlikely that the petroglyphs were created by Europeans. In addition, the petroglyphs were carved using fine tools; while finely carved artifacts dating as early as the Woodland period have been found in Illinois, no prehistoric rock art using the technique has been discovered in the state. The site was also near several Native American villages during the Historic period, as the Potawatomi and Kickapoo both occupied the river valley.
