= U.S. Route 24 in Illinois =

Section of United States Numbered Highway in Illinois, United States

U.S. Route 24
- US 24 highlighted in red

Route information
- Maintained by IDOT
- Length: 255.13 mi (410.59 km) Length includes both directions of US 24 where it is routed onto two one-way streets through some cities.
- Existed: 1926–present

Major junctions
- West end: US 24 at Quincy
- I-172 / IL 110 (CKC) / IL 336 in Quincy; US 67 in Rushville; I-474 in Bartonville; I-474 in Creve Coeur; I-74 in East Peoria; I-39 / US 51 in El Paso; I-55 in Chenoa; I-57 in Gilman; US 45 in Gilman; US 52 in Sheldon
- East end: US 24 / US 52 in Effner

Location
- Country: United States
- State: Illinois
- Counties: Adams, Brown, Schuyler, Fulton, Peoria, Tazewell, Woodford, McLean, Livingston, Ford, Iroquois

Highway system
- United States Numbered Highway System; List; Special; Divided; Illinois State Highway System; Interstate; US; State; Tollways; Scenic
← I-24	→ IL 24

U.S. Route 24 (US 24) in the U.S. state of Illinois is a major arterial road that runs from the Missouri state line at the Mississippi River in Quincy to Sheldon. This is a distance of 255.13 miles (410.59 km).

== Route description ==
=== Quincy to Eureka ===
From Quincy to the Peoria area, the US 24 route follows the old Peoria to Quincy stage coach route.

The US 24 crossing into Illinois from Missouri over the Mississippi River consists of two bridges: westbound traffic uses the newer Bayview Bridge while eastbound traffic uses the Quincy Memorial Bridge. At the eastern end of the Quincy Memorial Bridge, eastbound US 24 overlaps Illinois Route 57 (IL 57) northbound (4th Street) for two blocks before IL 57 ends at IL 104 (Broadway) and westbound US 24 turns off onto the bridge at the northern terminus of IL 57. US 24 continues north at IL 104 and serves only the northwestern portion of Quincy.

US 24 overlaps IL 96 briefly before running due east. It has a full interchange with the northern terminus of Interstate 172 (I-172); as of 2006, IL 336 continues northbound of I-172.

US 24 then proceeds through a series of small towns; east of Camp Point, it intersects the southern terminus of IL 94. In Mount Sterling it briefly overlaps IL 99; IL 107 ends just south of US 24. At this point, the highway turns northeast once again.

Just outside Ripley, US 24 intersects the western terminus of IL 103. US 24 then intersects US 67 outside of Rushville. It enters Rushville from the west and exits north, on Kinderhook Road.

US 24 continues northeast and follows a series of concurrencies. West of Havana, US 24 joins IL 100 northbound, and US 136 westbound, forming a wrong-way concurrency. US 136 leaves US 24 and travels west at Duncan Mills, while US 24 and IL 100 continue north to Lewistown. In Lewistown, the US 24/IL 100 combination intersects IL 97 (Avenue E). IL 97/IL 100 run north while US 24 eastbound joins with IL 97 southbound. US 24/IL 97 meets IL 78, where IL 78/IL 97 runs southbound and US 24 eastbound joins with IL 78 northbound. The series of concurrencies ends in Little America, where IL 78 turns north and US 24 continues northeast.

IL 9 overlaps US 24 from Banner, through Kingston Mines and Mapleton, to where IL 9 splits and crosses the river to Pekin.

North of the Pekin turnoff, US 24 enters Bartonville as South Adams Street. Where Adams Street climbs a hill, US 24 splits off onto McKinley Avenue, rejoining Adams Street just south of the I-474 interchange.

Just before it enters the south side of Peoria, US 24 turns southeast onto I-474 to cross the Shade–Lohmann Bridge. Previously, US 24 ran together with US 150 across the McClugage Bridge upstream, crossing into East Peoria; when it was realigned to the current routing, the section through Peoria was decommissioned.

US 24 leaves I-474 after three miles and enters Creve Coeur with IL 29 northbound as South Main Street.

US 24/IL 29 enters East Peoria from the south and has a partial interchange with IL 8/IL 116 westbound. US 24/IL 29 joins IL 8/IL 116 eastbound at this point.

From Camp Street onward, the concurrencies with US 24 become more complex:

- US 24/IL 29/IL 116 join US 150 westbound, forming a wrong-way concurrency. IL 8 splits from US 24 and travels east-northeast, along with US 150 eastbound.
- US 24/US 150/IL 29/IL 116 have an interchange with I-74. IL 29 splits onto I-74 westbound to cross the river to Peoria, while US 24/US 150/IL 116 continue northeast.
- At the interchange east of the McClugage Bridge, IL 116 continues northeast, US 150 crosses the bridge over the Illinois River, and US 24 turns to the east.

The highway continues past Illinois Central College to the interchange of US 24 Business (US 24 Bus.) and the eastern terminus of IL 8 (US 24 Bus. and IL 8 form an unsigned wrong-way concurrency at this point). US 24 Bus. continues to Washington's town square on a four-lane undivided surface road, which eventually narrows to a two-lane road; the US 24 bypass remains four lanes divided to Main Street north of Washington. The eastern terminus of US 24 Bus. is near Eureka.

=== Eureka to Indiana ===
In Eureka, US 24 has a stoplight with IL 117; there are also numerous signs to Eureka College and the Ronald Reagan Trail, as Eureka had prominence in President Ronald Reagan's early life. US 24 then continues east, bypassing Secor to the south before meeting with I-39.

Just east of I-39, US 24 serves as the main east–west road through El Paso, which largely serves as a stop for travelers on I-39. US 24 travels through one other community, Gridley, before having an interchange with I-55 west of Chenoa.

East of I-55, US 24 has an intersection with former US 66. It then passes through the towns of Fairbury, Forrest, and Chatsworth, intersecting IL 47 in Forrest. Just south of Gilman, US 24 has an interchange with I-57 before overlapping US 45 through Gilman. The two highways separate east of Gilman.

In Crescent City, US 24 intersects IL 49. In Watseka, it overlaps IL 1 through the town; the final concurrency, with US 52 in Sheldon carries into Indiana.

== History ==
The routing of US 24 in Illinois is largely unchanged from 1926. US 24 formerly ran through Canton and Peoria on various roads; it was relocated southeast out of both cities in 1937 and 2012, respectively.

In 1995, a bypass around Washington was completed. The old US 24 became an extension of IL 8 to near Eureka. In 1997, it was changed to Business US 24, and IL 8 was truncated back to west of Washington.

Since the 1950s, US 24 through Illinois and Missouri has been considered as one route of various Chicago to Kansas City federal Interstate proposals (1956, 1968, 1972). None of these proposals received federal funding or support. Portions of US 24 are incorporated in the Chicago–Kansas City Expressway. This highway involved new signage designating the route as IL 110 and did not require any new road construction.

== Major intersections ==
County	Location	mi	km	Destinations	Notes
Mississippi River		0.0	0.0	US 24 west	Continuation into Missouri
Mississippi River		0.0	0.0	Bayview Bridge (westbound), Quincy Memorial Bridge (eastbound); Missouri–Illinois state line	
Adams	Quincy	0.5	0.80	IL 57 south / Great River Road (National Route) south (3rd Street)	Western end of Great River Road overlap
Adams	Quincy	0.8	1.3	IL 104 east (Broadway Street)	
Adams		7.8	12.6	IL 96 south / Lincoln Heritage Trail (Western Branch) spur	Western end of IL 96 overlap / Lincoln Heritage Trail spur
Adams	Ursa	8.5	13.7	IL 96 north / Great River Road (National Route) north / Lincoln Heritage Trail (Western Branch) – Hamilton	Eastern end of IL 96/Great River Road overlap; western end of Lincoln Heritage Trail overlap
Adams	Bloomfield	11.6	18.7	I-172 south / IL 110 (CKC) / IL 336 north – Hannibal, Macomb	I-172 exit 19
Adams	Camp Point	27.0	43.5	IL 94 north	
Brown	Mount Sterling	42.0	67.6	IL 99 north (NW Cross Street) – Camden	Western end of IL 99 overlap
Brown	Mount Sterling	42.5	68.4	IL 99 south (Pittsfield Road) to IL 107 – Versailles	Eastern end of IL 99 overlap
Schuyler	Ripley	50.8	81.8	IL 103 east / Lincoln Heritage Trail (Western Branch) – Beardstown	Eastern end of Lincoln Heritage Trail overlap
Schuyler	Rushville	57.8	93.0	US 67 – Macomb, Beardstown	
Fulton	Astoria	84.5	136.0	US 136 east / IL 100 south – Havana	Western end of US 136/IL 100 overlap
Fulton	Duncan Mills	86.7	139.5	US 136 west – Macomb	Eastern end of US 136 overlap
Fulton	Lewistown	91.4	147.1	IL 97 north / IL 100 north – Cuba	Western end of IL 97 overlap; eastern end of IL 100 overlap
Fulton		94.9	152.7	IL 78 south / IL 97 south / Illinois River Road – Havana	Western end of IL 78 and Illinois River Road overlap; eastern end of IL 97 overlap
Fulton	Liverpool	98.0	157.7	IL 78 north – Canton	
Fulton	Banner	108.4	174.5	IL 9 west – Canton	Western end of IL 9 overlap
Peoria	Mapleton	122.3	196.8	IL 9 east – Pekin	Eastern end of IL 9 overlap
Peoria	Peoria–Bartonville line	127.5	205.2	I-474 west / Illinois River Road north – Galesburg	Western end of I-474 overlap; eastern end of Illinois River Road overlap
Illinois River		129.4	208.2	Shade–Lohmann Bridge	
Tazewell	Creve Coeur	130.1	209.4	I-474 east / IL 29 south / Illinois River Road south – Bloomington, Pekin	Eastern end of I-474 overlap; western end of IL 29 and Illinois River Road overlap
Tazewell	East Peoria	133.8	215.3	IL 8 west / IL 116 west – Peoria	Western end of IL 8/IL 116 overlap; interchange
Tazewell	East Peoria	134.6	216.6	US 150 east / IL 8 east (East Camp Street)	Western end of US 150 overlap; eastern end of IL 8 overlap
Tazewell	East Peoria	135.2	217.6	I-74 / IL 29 north – Bloomington, Peoria	Eastern end of IL 29 overlap; I-74 east exit 95A, west exit 95
Tazewell	East Peoria	138.6	223.1	US 150 west / IL 116 east / Illinois River Road north – Peoria, Metamora	Eastern end of US 150/IL 116/Illinois River Road overlap; grade-separated interchange
Tazewell	Washington Township	141.5	227.7	US 24 Bus. east / IL 8 west – East Peoria, Washington	
Woodford	Cruger Township	149.4	240.4	US 24 Bus. west / Ronald Reagan Trail	West end of Ronald Reagan Trail overlap
Woodford	Eureka	152.4	245.3	IL 117 (Main Street) / Ronald Reagan Trail	East end of Ronald Reagan Trail overlap
Woodford	El Paso	160.0	257.5	I-39 / US 51 – Rockford, Bloomington–Normal	I-39 exit 14
Woodford	El Paso	162.5	261.5	IL 251 (Fayette Street) – Minonk, Kappa	
McLean	Chenoa	177.5	285.7	I-55 – Joliet, Bloomington	I-55 exit 187
McLean	Chenoa	178.0	286.5	Historic US 66	
Livingston	Forrest	194.7	313.3	IL 47 (Center Street) – Dwight, Gibson City	
Ford	Piper City	206.4	332.2	IL 115 north (Green Street)	Western end of IL 115 overlap
Ford	Piper City	206.8	332.8	IL 115 south – Roberts	Eastern end of IL 115 overlap
Iroquois	Gilman	216.0	347.6	I-57 – Kankakee, Champaign	I-57 exit 283
Iroquois	Gilman	216.5	348.4	US 45 south – Onarga	Western end of US 45 overlap
Iroquois	Gilman	218.3	351.3	US 45 north – Ashkum	Eastern end of US 45 overlap
Iroquois	Crescent City	224.4	361.1	IL 49 – Kankakee, Rankin	
Iroquois	Watseka	230.6	371.1	IL 1 north (Jefferson Street) – Momence	Western end of IL 1 overlap
Iroquois	Watseka	233.4	375.6	IL 1 south – Hoopeston	Eastern end of IL 1 overlap
Iroquois	Sheldon	240.3	386.7	US 52 west – Kankakee	Western end of US 52 overlap
Iroquois	Effner	242.4	390.1	US 24 east / US 52 east – Kentland	Continuation into Indiana
1.000 mi = 1.609 km; 1.000 km = 0.621 mi: Concurrency terminus

== See also ==
U.S. Route 24
Previous state: Missouri	Illinois	Next state: Indiana
