= Emiquon National Wildlife Refuge =

Wetland wildlife refuge in Fulton County, Illinois

- IUCN category IV (habitat/species management area)
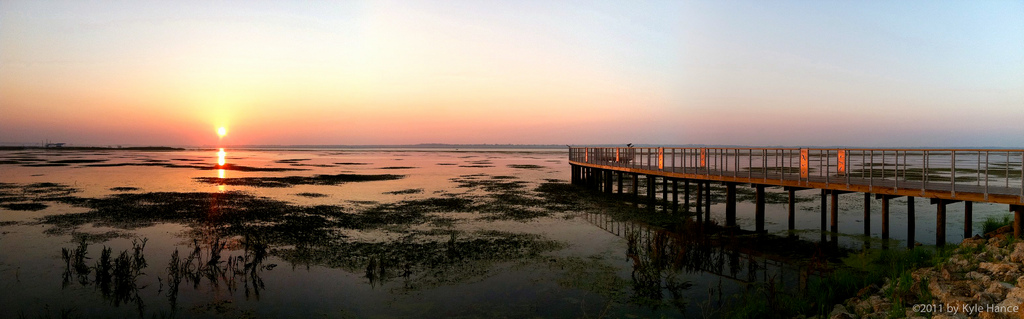
- Sunrise at the Emiquon National Wildlife Refuge in July, 2011.

- Location within the United States
- Location: Fulton County, Illinois, United States
- Nearest city: Havana, Illinois
- Coordinates: 40°19′30″N 90°05′30″W
- Area: 11,122 acres (45.01 km^{2})
- Established: 1993
- Governing body: U.S. Fish and Wildlife Service
- Website: Emiquon National Wildlife Refuge

Ramsar Wetland
- Official name: The Emiquon Complex
- Designated: 2 February 2012
- Reference no.: 2031

The Emiquon National Wildlife Refuge is a 11,122-acre (45.01 km^{2}) wetland wildlife refuge located in Waterford Township in Fulton County, Illinois across the Illinois River from the town of Havana. Only 3,000 acres (12 km^{2}) are currently managed by the U.S. Fish and Wildlife Service as part of the Illinois River National Wildlife and Fish Refuges Complex. It is in the Central forest-grasslands transition ecoregion.

Most of the wildlife refuge is made up of reclaimed agricultural land. A 7,100-acre (29 km^{2}) reclamation project within the Refuge, the Emiquon Project, is operated by The Nature Conservancy, which is a partner with the U.S. Fish and Wildlife Service in the creation of the Refuge.

In February 2012, the Emiquon Complex, centering on the Emiquon NWR, was designated under the Ramsar Convention as a Wetland of International Importance.

== History ==
The Emiquon National Wildlife Refuge and the Emiquon Project cover the historic beds of Flag Lake and Thompson Lake, which were shallow, alluvial lakes created by the Illinois River during the geological period that followed the last ice age. Heavy loads of sand and silt carried southwest by the river created almost random, undulating topography along the river's bed. The river responded to these deposits by repeatedly shifting its course, leaving long, narrow sections of abandoned riverbed behind it. Two of these sections became Flag Lake and Thompson Lake.

Surrounding these two lakes, and strung out along the western bank of the Illinois River, was a characteristic North American riverine ecosystem characterized by dense populations of shellfish, fish, migratory birds, and mammals. The Emiquon wetland became a favorite home for many Indians of the Illinois Territory for thousands of years, leaving 149 known archeological sites behind them within the parcels of land that make up the Project. These hunter-gatherers used and lived in and around both the wetlands of Emiquon and the adjacent river bluffs. During the centuries between 1000 CE and 1300 CE, many of them buried their dead in an adjacent blufftop, now the Dickson Mounds National Historic Site.

When new Americans of European ancestry began living along the Illinois River in the late 17th century, they brought several wetland diseases with them, notably malaria. Local Indian populations declined, and the settlers tried not to live in or near wetlands, believing them to be unhealthy places to live. When Fulton County was organized in 1823, the settlers selected a blufftop location several miles away as the county seat.

A population of local Illinois River settlers thinly settled the Emiquon riverbank, which was too wet for traditional European-style farming. The region continued to yield a living to fur trappers, hunters, and fishermen. However, in 1919 Joy Morton, a wealthy Chicago CEO, acquired the Emiquon area and had a levee built around it and drainage ditches dug. Emiquon became the Norris Farm, and the former wetlands and lake beds were drained and converted into cornfields. The formerly free-flowing Illinois River was dammed and confined to a narrow channel running between artificial banks. Much of Emiquon was low-lying and required periodic pumping with electric motors so that the land could remain dry and useful as farmland. It was the largest agricultural farm in Illinois.

== Restoration project ==
Throughout the 20th century, alterations to the Illinois riverbed caused severe damage to the ecological diversity and fish productivity of the river. Beginning in the 1960s, naturalists lobbied for restoration of parts of the riverbed and former wetlands. After extended negotiations, the Nature Conservancy acquired the 7,100-acre (29 km^{2}) property in 2000. In 2007, the Conservancy enrolled a 6,400-acre (26 km^{2}) parcel within the Project in the federally subsidized Wetlands Reserve Program.

By 2008, volunteers working with the Nature Conservancy had replanted 300,000 wetland trees, including black walnuts, swamp white oaks, and pecans, and 8,000 pounds (3,600 kg) of grassland seed. The Conservancy believed that the Emiquon Project was the second largest wetlands restoration project in the United States, behind the Restoration of the Everglades.

As part of the restoration efforts, drainage pumps were turned off and one of the natural lake beds within the Project, Thompson Lake, began to refill. As of 2008, Thompson Lake was a 2,000-acre (8.1 km^{2}) lake within the Project. This compares to the lake's original size of 1,800-acre (7.3 km^{2}) when it was a natural lake. The reborn lake and adjacent wetlands were attractive to waterbirds, with 17 separate species of ducks reported.

As of 2009, the U.S. Fish and Wildlife Service's long-range master plan for the Emiquon National Wildlife Refuge including acquiring the Emiquon Project's land, building out the refuge's 11,122-acre (45.01 km^{2}) footprint, and enrolling the new Refuge into the Illinois River National Wildlife Refuge Complex, managed from the Chautauqua National Wildlife Refuge's headquarters in Havana.

In 2017, the land was drained after being wet for 10 years to simulate a drought. Wetlands benefit from dry periods to compact soil and help plants grow, and birds benefit from catching fish in smaller pools.

== Current resources ==
The Conservancy's long-range master plan for the Emiquon Project, meanwhile, included restoration of the parcel's natural drainage patterns to the maximum extent possible, including reconstruction of a free-flowing connection between the Illinois River and Thompson Lake. As of 2008, the refilled lakes were stocked with more than 30 species of fish, including largemouth bass, bluegill, bullhead, channel catfish, crappie, and sunfish. Several dozen fish-eating black-crowned night herons had also arrived.

In addition to game fish, heritage fish were also planted in Flag Lake and Thompson Lake, such as the state-endangered redspotted sunfish and the state-threatened starhead topminnow.

As of 2024, there are over 287 native species that make their home in Emiquon. Emiquon also has challenges with invasive species such as Asian carp and mute swans. Thousands of migratory birds pass through the site each year.

The Conservancy also planned to construct welcome facilities to encourage birdwatchers and other visitors to enjoy the reborn wetland. The Emiquon Project's location, within 40 miles (64 km) of Peoria and adjacent to the established Dickson Mounds museum, was expected to help draw visitors.

In April 2008, the University of Illinois at Springfield opened a field station at Emiquon to conduct research and monitor restoration progress.

Illinois Route 78 and Illinois Route 97 run through the Emiquon Project. The state highways run concurrently in the Project region.

The Emiquon Preserve visitor area is open year-round from sunrise to sunset. There are over 2 miles (3.2 km) of trails and two observation decks for viewing wildlife.
