= Illinois Route 78 =

State highway in western Illinois, US

Illinois Route 78
- IL 78 highlighted in red

Route information
- Maintained by IDOT
- Length: 215.51 mi (346.83 km)
- Existed: 1924–present

Major junctions
- South end: US 67 Bus. / IL 104 in Jacksonville
- US 136 / IL 97 in Havana; US 24 / IL 97 in Lewistown; US 150 in Laura; US 34 from Galva to Kewanee; US 6 in Annawan; I-80 in Annawan; I-88 / IL 110 (CKC) in Lyndon; US 30 in Morrison; US 52 / IL 64 in Mount Carroll; US 20 in Stockton
- North end: WIS 78 in Warren

Location
- Country: United States
- State: Illinois
- Counties: Morgan, Cass, Mason, Fulton, Knox, Peoria, Stark, Henry, Whiteside, Carroll, Jo Daviess

Highway system
- Illinois State Highway System; Interstate; US; State; Tollways; Scenic
← IL 76	→ I-80

Illinois Route 78 is a major north–south highway in western Illinois. It runs from Illinois Route 104 northwest of Jacksonville north to Highway 78 at the Wisconsin state line north of Warren. This is a distance of 215.51 miles (346.83 km).

== Route description ==
=== Jacksonville to Elmwood ===
Starting from IL 104 in Jacksonville, IL 78 briefly travels east, then south, and then east again. Then, it turns north via Main Street, passing the Jacksonville Municipal Airport. As it continues north, it then reaches IL 125 in Virginia. In Havana, US 136, as well as IL 97, begins to run concurrently with IL 78. US 136 then leaves the concurrency just west of the Scott W. Lucas Bridge. At the US 24 junction, IL 97 branches off west via US 24 while IL 78 travels east via US 24. In Little America, IL 78 branches off north from US 24. Then, IL 9 runs concurrently with IL 78 in Canton. In Farmington, IL 78 turns east via IL 116 and then back north again; branching off north from IL 116. In Elmwood, it follows IL 8 east and then north before branching off north.

=== Elmwood to Wisconsin state line ===
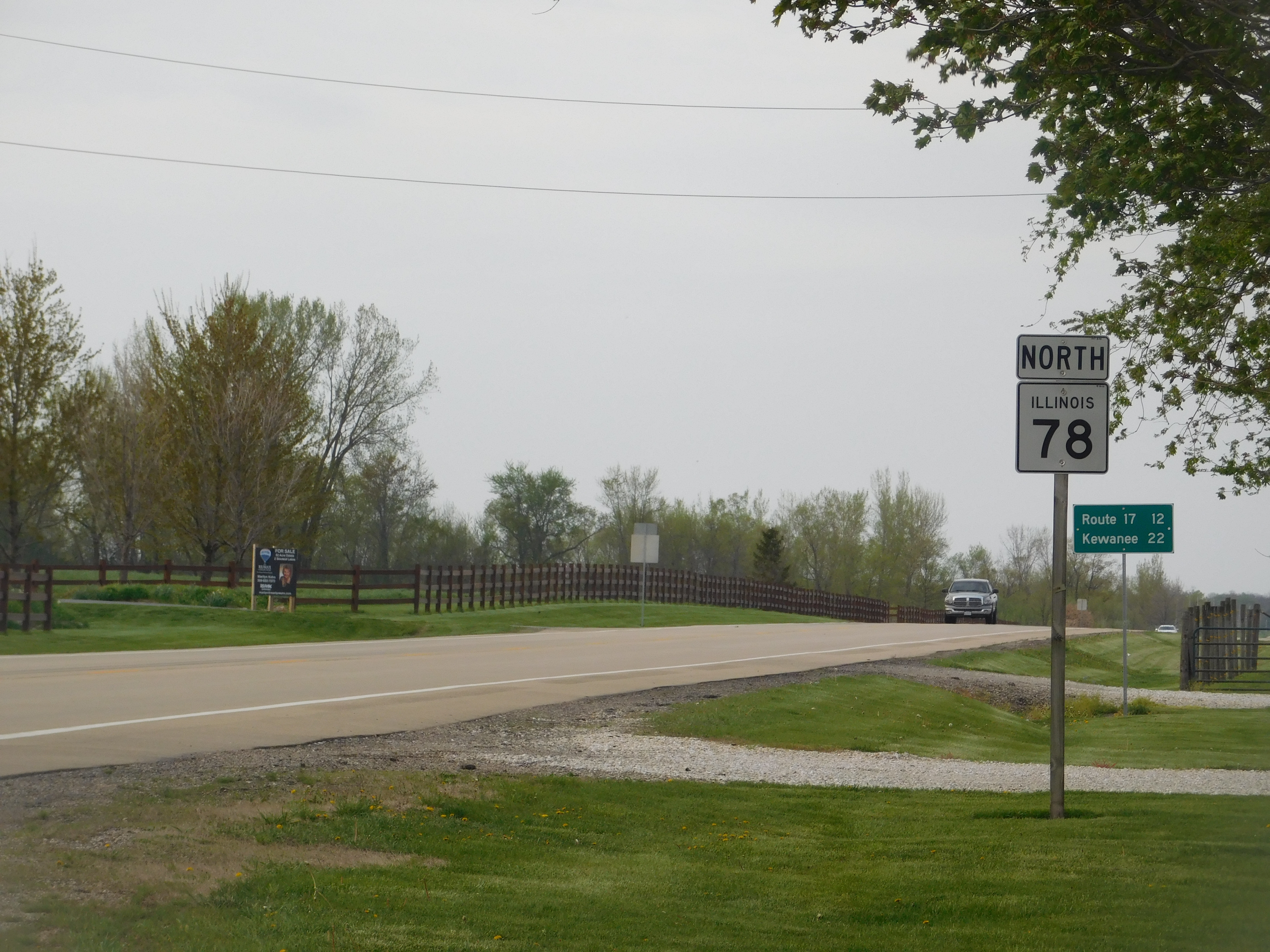
IL 78 north of Laura in Peoria County

Further north, IL 78 then crosses under I-74 without a direct interchange. It then turns east and then north again. As it turns back north, it then follows US 150 for 3 miles (4.8 km). After that, it then intersects IL 90 north of Laura, then briefly runs concurrently with IL 17, then with US 34, and then intersects with IL 91. In Kewanee, US 34 then branches off northeast. North of the junction, IL 81 ends at the intersection with IL 78. In Annawan, it crosses US 6 and then I-80 at a diamond interchange. Further north, IL 78 then runs concurrently with IL 92, then meets I-88/IL 110 (CKC) at a diamond interchange, and then runs concurrently with US 30 in Morrison. IL 40 ends at an intersection south of Mount Carroll. In Mount Carroll, it intersects US 52/IL 64. Further north, in Stockton, IL 78 then runs concurrently with US 20. In Warren, it then turns northwest before reaching the Wisconsin state line. At that point, IL 78 becomes WIS 78.

== History ==
Starting in 1929, IL 78 first appeared as segments while the rest were under construction. Within a few years, most of IL 78 from Jacksonville to Warren was finished. In 1935, IL 78 superseded portions of IL 82, IL 3, and IL 40. However, a section between Jacksonville and Virginia became part of US 67. By the late 1930s, a portion of IL 78 was moved onto a more direct route between Maples Mill and West Havana. It remained like that until 1968 when US 67 rerouted away from Virginia. This resulted in the extension of IL 78 from Virginia to Jacksonville.

== Points of interest ==
The following historic and geographic sites can be enjoyed on Illinois Route 78, traveling from south to north:

- Jim Edgar Panther Creek State Fish and Wildlife Area
- Emiquon Project
- Dickson Mounds
- Snakeden Hollow State Fish and Wildlife Area
- Johnson-Sauk Trail State Park
- Prophetstown State Recreation Area
- Morrison-Rockwood State Park
- Apple River Canyon State Park

== Major intersections ==
County	Location	mi	km	Destinations	Notes
Morgan	Jacksonville	0.00	0.00	US 67 Bus. / IL 104 – Meredosia, Alton	Southern terminus of IL 78
Cass	Virginia	17.7	28.5	IL 125 – Beardstown, Ashland	
Cass	Sangamon Valley Township			Chandlerville Road / Lincoln Heritage Trail (Western Branch) west / Illinois River Road south	South end of Lincoln Heritage Trail/Illinois River Road overlap
Cass	Chandlerville			River Street / Lincoln Heritage Trail (Western Branch) east	North end of Lincoln Heritage Trail overlap
Mason	Havana	44.2	71.1	US 136 east / IL 97 south (West Dearborn Street) / Illinois River Road north – Duncan Mills, Kilbourne	Begin/end concurrency with US 136 and IL 97; Illinois River Road west route continues on IL 78
Illinois River		44.5	71.6	Scott W. Lucas Bridge	
Fulton	Isabel Township	45.3	72.9	US 136 west – Duncan Mills, Ipava	Begin/end concurrency with US 136
Fulton	Waterford Township	52.0	83.7	US 24 west / IL 97 north – Lewistown	Begin/end concurrency with US 24 / IL 97
Fulton	Little America	55.1	88.7	US 24 east / Illinois River Road north – Banner, Peoria	Begin/end concurrency with US 24/Illinois River Road
Fulton	Buckheart Township	61.5	99.0	IL 100 south – St. David, Lewistown	Eastern terminus of IL 100
Fulton	Canton	64.7	104.1	IL 9 east (East Linn Street) – Banner, Pekin	Begin/end concurrency with IL 9
Fulton	Canton	65.9	106.1	IL 9 west (West Locust Street) – Bushnell	Begin/end concurrency with IL 9
Fulton	Farmington	76.2	122.6	IL 116 west (North Main Street) – Roseville	Begin/end concurrency with IL 116
Fulton–Peoria county line	Farmington Township	77.2	124.2	IL 116 east – Peoria	Begin/end concurrency with IL 116
Knox	Salem Township	82.8	133.3	IL 8 west – Yates City	Begin/end concurrency with IL 8
Peoria	Elmwood	85.0	136.8	IL 8 east (West Southport Road) – Peoria	Begin/end concurrency with IL 8
Peoria	Brimfield Township	91.5	147.3	US 150 east to I-74 – Brimfield	Begin/end concurrency with US 150; connection to exit 71 (I-74)
Peoria	Millbrook Township	94.5	152.1	US 150 west – Galesburg	Begin/end concurrency with US 150
Peoria	Millbrook Township	96.5	155.3	IL 90 east – Princeville	Western terminus of IL 90
Stark	Goshen Township	108.2	174.1	IL 17 east – Toulon	Begin/end concurrency with IL 17
Stark	Goshen Township	108.6	174.8	IL 17 west – La Fayette	Begin/end concurrency with IL 17
Henry	Wethersfield Township	113.1	182.0	US 34 west – Galva	Begin/end concurrency with US 34
Henry	Wethersfield Township	113.7	183.0	IL 91 south – Elmira	Northern terminus of IL 91
Henry	Kewanee	118.3	190.4	US 34 east (East Second Street) – Neponset, Princeton	Begin/end concurrency with US 34
Henry	Kewanee	118.6	190.9	IL 81 west (West Sixth Street) – Cambridge	Eastern terminus of IL 81
Henry	Annawan	129.3	208.1	US 6 (Front Street) – Atkinson, Mineral	
Henry	Annawan	129.8	208.9	I-80 – Moline, Rock Island, Joliet	Exit 33 (I-80)
Henry	Yorktown Township	140.8	226.6	IL 92 west – East Moline	Begin/end concurrency with IL 92
Henry	Yorktown Township	141.7	228.0	IL 92 east – Yorktown	Begin/end concurrency with IL 92
Whiteside	Lyndon Township	154.6	248.8	I-88 / IL 110 (CKC) (Ronald Reagan Memorial Highway) – Dixon, Moline, Rock Island	Exit 26 (I-88)
Whiteside	Morrison	160.8	258.8	US 30 east (Lincoln Highway) – Sterling, Rock Falls	Begin/end concurrency with US 30
Whiteside	Morrison	162.3	261.2	US 30 west (Lincoln Highway) – Fulton	Begin/end concurrency with US 30
Carroll	Mount Carroll	180.4	290.3	IL 40 south – Sterling	Northern terminus of IL 40
Carroll	Mount Carroll	180.8	291.0	US 52 / IL 64 – Savanna, Lanark	
Jo Daviess	Stockton	201.5	324.3	US 20 west (West North Avenue) – Galena	Begin/end concurrency with US 20
Jo Daviess	Stockton Township	202.8	326.4	US 20 east – Freeport	Begin/end concurrency with US 20
Jo Daviess	Warren Township	215.51	346.83	WIS 78	Wisconsin state line; northern terminus of IL 78
1.000 mi = 1.609 km; 1.000 km = 0.621 mi
