= Interstate 172 =

Interstate Highway in Illinois

Interstate 172
- I-172 highlighted in red

Route information
- Auxiliary route of I-72
- Maintained by IDOT
- Length: 19.69 mi (31.69 km)
- Existed: 1995–present
- NHS: Entire route

Major junctions
- South end: I-72 / US 36 / IL 110 (CKC) near Hull
- North end: US 24 / IL 110 (CKC) / IL 336 near Quincy

Location
- Country: United States
- State: Illinois
- Counties: Pike, Adams

Highway system
- Interstate Highway System; Main; Auxiliary; Suffixed; Business; Future; Illinois State Highway System; Interstate; US; State; Tollways; Scenic
← IL 171	→ IL 172

Interstate 172 (I-172) is a spur route, the only auxiliary route of I-72. It is located entirely within the US state of Illinois and is completely concurrent with IL 110. The highway runs north from its start outside of Hannibal, Missouri, to about 2.5 miles (4.0 km) west of Fowler. At U.S. Route 24 (US 24), I-172 becomes Illinois Route 336 (IL 336), which runs north and east to Macomb via Carthage. The entire portion of I-172 and I-72 from I-172 east to Springfield is also known by its former name, the Central Illinois Expressway. I-172 is 19.69 miles (31.69 km) long.

== Route description ==
I-172 begins at a trumpet interchange with I-72/US 36, about five miles (8.0 km) east of Hannibal before immediately entering Adams County while concurrent with IL 110 (Chicago–Kansas City Expressway). I-172 enters the Quincy area at exit 10 (IL 96), passing to the far east of the city. I-172 ends just northeast of Quincy, ending at US 24, continuing north as IL 110/IL 336.

== History ==
I-172 originally was what I-72 is now from Springfield to the current interchange with I-172. This was approved by the American Association of State Highway and Transportation Officials (AASHTO) on June 9, 1991.

On April 23, 1995, after a reexamination by the Federal Highway Administration (FHWA), the highway to Hannibal was redesignated I-72, with the highway north to Quincy redesignated as I-172. The highway is non-chargeable, meaning that, even though it is an Interstate (designed and constructed to Interstate Highway standards and specifications), it was not built with federal funds.

== Exit list ==
County	Location	mi	km	Exit	Destinations	Notes
Pike	Levee Township	0.00	0.00	0	I-72 / US 36 / IL 110 (CKC) west / Great River Road south – Springfield, Hannibal, Kansas City	Southbound exit and northbound entrance; southern terminus, exit 0 is for 72 west; exit 4 eastbound/4A westbound on I-72.
Adams	Fall Creek Township	3.18	5.12	2	IL 57 – Marblehead, Quincy	
Adams	Melrose Township	10.52	16.93	10	IL 96 (Payson Street, 36th Street) – Quincy	
Adams	Quincy	14.47	23.29	14	IL 104 / Broadway – Quincy	Serves Quincy Airport
Adams	Ellington Township	15.90	25.59	15	Columbus Road, Wismann Lane	
Adams	Ellington Township	19.69	31.69	19	US 24 to IL 96 – Mount Sterling, Keokuk IL 110 (CKC) east / IL 336 north – Carthage, Macomb	Roadway continues as IL 110/IL 336
1.000 mi = 1.609 km; 1.000 km = 0.621 mi
