= Dunfermline, Illinois =

- Village
- Location of Dunfermline in Fulton County, Illinois.

- Location of Illinois in the United States
- Coordinates: 40°29′30″N 90°01′57″W
- Country: United States
- State: Illinois
- County: Fulton
- Township: Buckheart
- Established: 1887
- Named for: Dunfermline

Area
  - Total: 0.15 sq mi (0.38 km^{2})
  - Land: 0.15 sq mi (0.38 km^{2})
  - Water: 0 sq mi (0.00 km^{2})
- Elevation: 640 ft (200 m)

Population (2020)
  - Total: 262
  - Estimate (2024): 252
  - Density: 1,776.3/sq mi (685.84/km^{2})
- Time zone: UTC-6 (CST)
  - Summer (DST): UTC-5 (CDT)
- ZIP Code(s): 61524
- Area code: 309
- FIPS code: 17-21098
- GNIS ID: 2398755
- Wikimedia Commons: Dunfermline, Illinois

Dunfermline is a village in Fulton County, Illinois, United States. The population was 262 at the 2020 census. Dunfermline is pronounced Done-ferm-lin.

== History ==
A post office has been in operation at Dunfermline since 1887. A share of the first settlers being natives of Dunfermline, Scotland, caused the name to be selected.

== Geography ==
Dunfermline is located in east-central Fulton County. Illinois Route 78 forms the eastern border of the village; the highway leads north 5 miles (8 km) to Canton and south 6 miles (10 km) to U.S. Route 24 at Little America. Lewistown, the county seat, is 11 miles (18 km) to the southwest by Illinois Route 100.

According to the 2021 census gazetteer files, Dunfermline has a total area of 0.15 square miles (0.39 km^{2}), all land.

== Demographics ==
Historical population
Census	Pop.	Note	%±
1950	292		—
1960	284		−2.7%
1970	282		−0.7%
1980	313		11.0%
1990	259		−17.3%
2000	262		1.2%
2010	300		14.5%
2020	262		−12.7%
U.S. Decennial Census

As of the 2020 census there were 262 people, 159 households, and 121 families residing in the village. The population density was 1,782.31 inhabitants per square mile (688.15/km^{2}). There were 131 housing units at an average density of 891.16 per square mile (344.08/km^{2}). The racial makeup of the village was 93.89% White, 0.38% African American, 0.38% Native American, 1.15% Asian, 0.00% Pacific Islander, 0.00% from other races, and 4.20% from two or more races. Hispanic or Latino of any race were 1.53% of the population.

There were 159 households, out of which 31.4% had children under the age of 18 living with them, 60.38% were married couples living together, 5.66% had a female householder with no husband present, and 23.90% were non-families. 21.38% of all households were made up of individuals, and 12.58% had someone living alone who was 65 years of age or older. The average household size was 2.66 and the average family size was 2.39.

The village's age distribution consisted of 18.9% under the age of 18, 4.7% from 18 to 24, 22.9% from 25 to 44, 21.4% from 45 to 64, and 32.1% who were 65 years of age or older. The median age was 48.6 years. For every 100 females, there were 97.9 males. For every 100 females age 18 and over, there were 97.4 males.

The median income for a household in the village was $51,250, and the median income for a family was $58,542. Males had a median income of $51,806 versus $25,000 for females. The per capita income for the village was $27,722. About 1.7% of families and 8.2% of the population were below the poverty line, including 11.1% of those under age 18 and 3.3% of those age 65 or over.
