= Melrose Township =

Melrose Township may refer to the following places in the United States:

- Melrose Township, Adams County, Illinois
- Melrose Township, Clark County, Illinois
- Melrose Township, Grundy County, Iowa
- Melrose Township, Michigan
- Melrose Township, Stearns County, Minnesota
- Melrose Township, Steele County, North Dakota, in Steele County, North Dakota
- Melrose Township, Grant County, South Dakota, in Grant County, South Dakota
