= Melrose Township, Adams County, Illinois =

Township in Illinois, US

Melrose Township
- Township
- Location in Adams County

- Adams County's location in Illinois
- Coordinates: 39°53′07″N 91°20′40″W
- Country: United States
- State: Illinois
- County: Adams
- Established: November 6, 1849

Area
  - Total: 46.55 sq mi (120.6 km^{2})
  - Land: 44.57 sq mi (115.4 km^{2})
  - Water: 1.98 sq mi (5.1 km^{2}) 4.25%
- Elevation: 607 ft (185 m)

Population (2020)
  - Total: 5,748
  - Density: 129.0/sq mi (49.79/km^{2})
- Time zone: UTC-6 (CST)
  - Summer (DST): UTC-5 (CDT)
- ZIP codes: 62301, 62338, 62347, 62360
- FIPS code: 17-001-48203

Melrose Township is one of twenty-two townships in Adams County, Illinois, United States. As of the 2020 census, its population was 5,748 and it contained 2,375 housing units. The northwestern part of the township has been separated into Quincy Township.

== Geography ==
According to the 2010 census, the township has a total area of 46.55 square miles (120.6 km^{2}), of which 44.57 square miles (115.4 km^{2}) (or 95.75%) is land and 1.98 square miles (5.1 km^{2}) (or 4.25%) is water.

=== Unincorporated towns ===
- Sheridan Estates

=== Cemeteries ===
The township contains four cemeteries: Ehe, Melrose Chapel, Mount Carmel and Saint Anthonys.

=== Major highways ===
- Interstate 172 (spur of Interstate 72)
- US Route 24
- Illinois State Route 57
- Illinois State Route 104
- Illinois State Route 336

=== Airports and landing strips ===
- Seigfried Halfpap Airport

=== Rivers ===
- Mississippi River

=== Lakes ===
- Big Lake
- Snyder Lake
- Turtle Lake

=== Landmarks ===
- Indian Mounds Park (east edge)
- Lock and Dam No. 21

== Demographics ==
As of the 2020 census there were 5,748 people, 2,358 households, and 1,668 families residing in the township. The population density was 122.95 inhabitants per square mile (47.47/km^{2}). There were 2,375 housing units at an average density of 50.80 per square mile (19.61/km^{2}). The racial makeup of the township was 93.34% White, 1.22% African American, 0.00% Native American, 0.71% Asian, 0.02% Pacific Islander, 0.61% from other races, and 4.11% from two or more races. Hispanic or Latino of any race were 1.44% of the population.

There were 2,358 households, out of which 23.20% had children under the age of 18 living with them, 60.73% were married couples living together, 8.23% had a female householder with no spouse present, and 29.26% were non-families. 20.30% of all households were made up of individuals, and 7.60% had someone living alone who was 65 years of age or older. The average household size was 2.35 and the average family size was 2.75.

The township's age distribution consisted of 19.4% under the age of 18, 9.4% from 18 to 24, 17.6% from 25 to 44, 33.6% from 45 to 64, and 20.1% who were 65 years of age or older. The median age was 49.1 years. For every 100 females, there were 99.5 males. For every 100 females age 18 and over, there were 97.3 males.

The median income for a household in the township was $75,596, and the median income for a family was $88,750. Males had a median income of $47,607 versus $34,399 for females. The per capita income for the township was $43,508. About 10.9% of families and 8.3% of the population were below the poverty line, including 7.9% of those under age 18 and 1.3% of those age 65 or over.

Historical population
Census	Pop.	Note	%±
2010	5,746		—
2020	5,748		0.0%
U.S. Decennial Census

== School districts ==
- Payson Community Unit School District 1
- Quincy Public School District 172

== Political districts ==
- Illinois' 17th congressional district
- State House District 93
- State Senate District 47
