= Illinois State Museum =

Museum in Springfield, Illinois, US

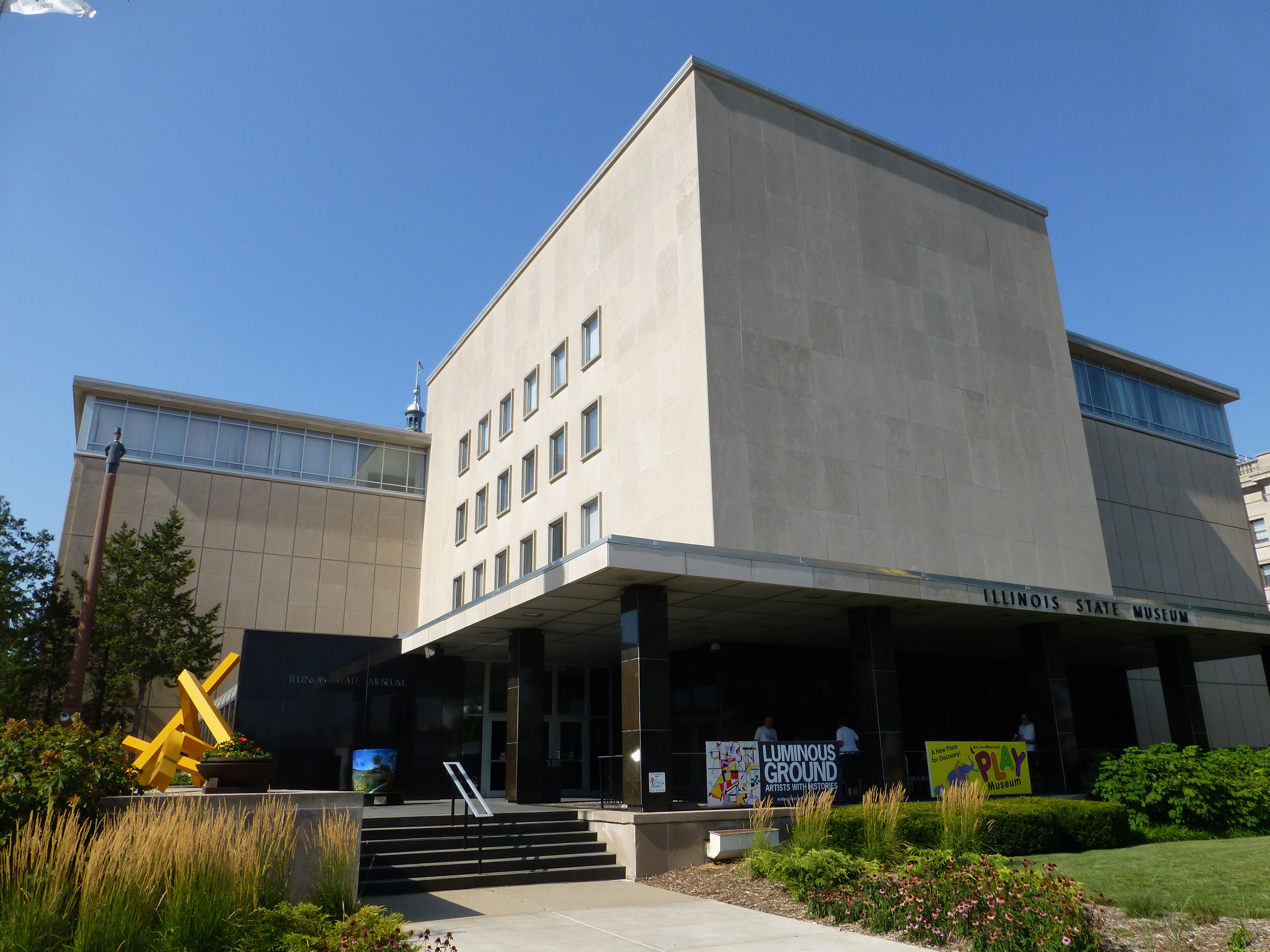
- Established: 1877
- Location: 502 South Spring Street; Springfield, Illinois, United States
- Coordinates: 39.7967°N 89.6554°W
- Type: Art museum, history museum, natural history/anthropology museum
- Director: Cinnamon Catlin-Legutko
- Public transit access: SMTD
- Website: www.illinoisstatemuseum.org

The Illinois State Museum features the life, land, people and art of the State of Illinois. In addition to natural history exhibits, the main museum in Springfield focuses on the state's cultural and artistic heritage. Exhibits include local fossils and mining, household displays from different historic periods, dioramas of Native American life, archaeological and ethnographic artifacts, and a collection of glass paperweights.

The headquarters museum is located on Spring and Edwards Streets, one block southwest of the Illinois State Capitol, in Springfield. There are three satellite locations: Dickson Mounds in Lewistown, the Lockport Gallery in Lockport, and the ISM's Research and Collections Center in Springfield.

== History ==
The Illinois State Museum was founded on May 25, 1877, as a showcase within the sixth Illinois State Capitol in Springfield, which was completed at that time. Amos Henry Worthen was first curator. As the state's government grew, the museum collection was moved from the Capitol Building to the newly constructed Centennial Building, now known as the Michael Howlett building, in 1923.

With continued growth of its collections, and the need to have a dedicated location in Springfield for tourists and school groups, the state began construction of its first purpose-built state museum in 1961. The building was completed in 1962. This building is the current Illinois State Museum.

In the 1980s and 1990s, the Illinois State Museum expanded to also open four satellite museums. The Dickson Mounds Museum, near Lewistown, Illinois, specializes in the anthropology of the Native Americans of the Illinois River valley, while the museums in Chicago, Lockport, and Rend Lake largely contain rotating exhibitions of Illinois-based fine arts and crafts.

Due to Illinois budgetary challenges, the Illinois State Museum was temporarily closed from October 2015 to June 2016. After adopting an admission fee, the flagship museum reopened on July 2, 2016. The fee is waived for children and veterans. The Chicago Gallery and the Southern Illinois Artisans Gallery were not reopened.

=== Repatriation of human remains and objects ===
In late October 2019 the first collection of many sacred artifacts belonging to Indigenous Australians held in US museums were returned by the Illinois Museum. As the first phase of a larger project, 42 Aranda and Bardi Jawi objects were sent first to Sydney, before being returned to central Australia, from where they were taken around 1920.

The museum is estimated to hold more than 6100 Native American remains that have not been repatriated despite the passage of the Native American Graves Protection and Repatriation Act in 1990.

== Dickson Mounds ==
The Dickson Mounds Museum, located in Lewistown, is an archaeological museum of Illinois's Native American history. Exhibits include hands-on displays, dioramas, photos and artifacts that depict area cultures from the Ice-Age to the 19th century. The museum grounds comprise 230 acres (0.93 km^{2}) including the Eveland Village, the excavated remains of three early Native American buildings.

== Lockport Gallery ==
The Lockport Gallery, located in Lockport, features changing exhibitions of past and contemporary Illinois artists and artisans. The gallery is located in the 1850 Norton Building, which was originally used to house grain, a supply store, and a dormitory for canal crews. The building functioned as a grain-processing facility until the 1950s. The gallery temporarily closed in October 2015.

== Southern Illinois Art & Artisans Center ==
The main gallery of the Southern Illinois Art & Artisans Center is the Southern Illinois Art Gallery, which features changing exhibits of contemporary and history Illinois artists, as well as fine art, decorative art and ethnographic art from the collections of the Illinois State Museum. The center also features the Southern Illinois Artisans Shop, which sells fine crafts from Illinois artisans and offers artisan workshops, demonstrations, and special arts and crafts events. The center is located in Whittington, near Rend Lake. The center closed in October 2015, and has not reopened.

== ISM Chicago Gallery ==
The ISM Chicago Gallery, located in the James R. Thompson Center in Chicago, featured changing exhibits of fine and decorative arts. The gallery closed in October 2015, and has not reopened. As the state has sold the Thompson Center and has been relocating offices from the structure, the gallery's future is unclear.

== Governance ==
Illinois Governor Jim Edgar, by executive order in 1995, made the State Museum part of the new Illinois Department of Natural Resources (IDNR).

The Illinois State Museum is, as of January 2019, a division of IDNR and consists of four museum facilities: the flagship Museum and the Research and Collections Center in Springfield, Dickson Mounds in Lewistown, and the Lockport Gallery in Lockport. The Museum has its own 11-member board, appointed by the Governor of Illinois with the advice and consent of the Illinois State Senate.

The Illinois State Museum is charged by state law with the responsibility "to collect and preserve objects of scientific and artistic value, representing past and present fauna and flora, the life and work of man, geological history, natural resources, and the manufacturing and fine arts; to interpret for and educate the public concerning the foregoing."
