= Illinois Route 57 =

State highway in western Illinois, US

Illinois Route 57
- Gardner Expressway
- IL 57 highlighted in red

Route information
- Maintained by IDOT
- Length: 12.59 mi (20.26 km)
- Existed: 1949–present

Major junctions
- South end: I-172 / IL 110 (CKC) in Fall Creek
- North end: US 24 / IL 104 in Quincy

Location
- Country: United States
- State: Illinois
- Counties: Adams

Highway system
- Illinois State Highway System; Interstate; US; State; Tollways; Scenic
← I-57	→ IL 58

Illinois Route 57 (IL 57) is a north–south state highway in western Illinois. It runs from Interstate 172 (I-172) in Fall Creek to U.S. Route 24 (US 24) and IL 104 in Quincy, a distance of 12.59 miles (20.26 km).

== Route description ==
IL 57 begins at a partial cloverleaf interchange with I-172, where it heads generally northwest for several miles, passing the communities of Bluff Hall and Marblehead. After an intersection with 24th Street, IL 57 curves slightly north, where it turns into Gardner Expressway, passing numerous industries and small businesses, before passing a large underground storage complex. The highway becomes highly industrialized, turning into a four-lane divided expressway for over a mile. The highway turns slightly to the east at Jefferson Street, taking on the 3rd Street designation, and straightens out. Once inside Quincy proper, IL 57 becomes a four-lane arterial for a third of a mile before splitting into two legs. The northbound leg follows York Street eastward for one block, turns north onto 4th Street, and terminates at US 24 just two blocks later, while the southbound leg starts at IL 104/US 24 and follows 3rd Street. IL 57 is an undivided, rural two-lane road for most of its length.

== History ==
SBI Route 57 was the current US 41 and IL 50 from Highland Park to Chicago. In 1949 it was moved to Hull to Quincy, following much of the same alignment it does today. As late as 1962, it was moved from its original alignment following 8th Street, Jackson Street, and 12th Street to its current alignment following Gardner Expressway and 3rd Street. In 1999 it was shortened to its current length after I-172 was completed.

== Major intersections ==
The entire route is in Adams County.

Location	mi	km	Destinations	Notes
Fall Creek	0.00	0.00	I-172 / IL 110 (CKC) to I-72 – Hannibal, Quincy, Macomb	I-172 exit 2; southern terminus of IL 57
Quincy	12.59	20.26	US 24 / IL 104	Northern terminus of IL 57
1.000 mi = 1.609 km; 1.000 km = 0.621 mi
