= Scott Wike Lucas Bridge =

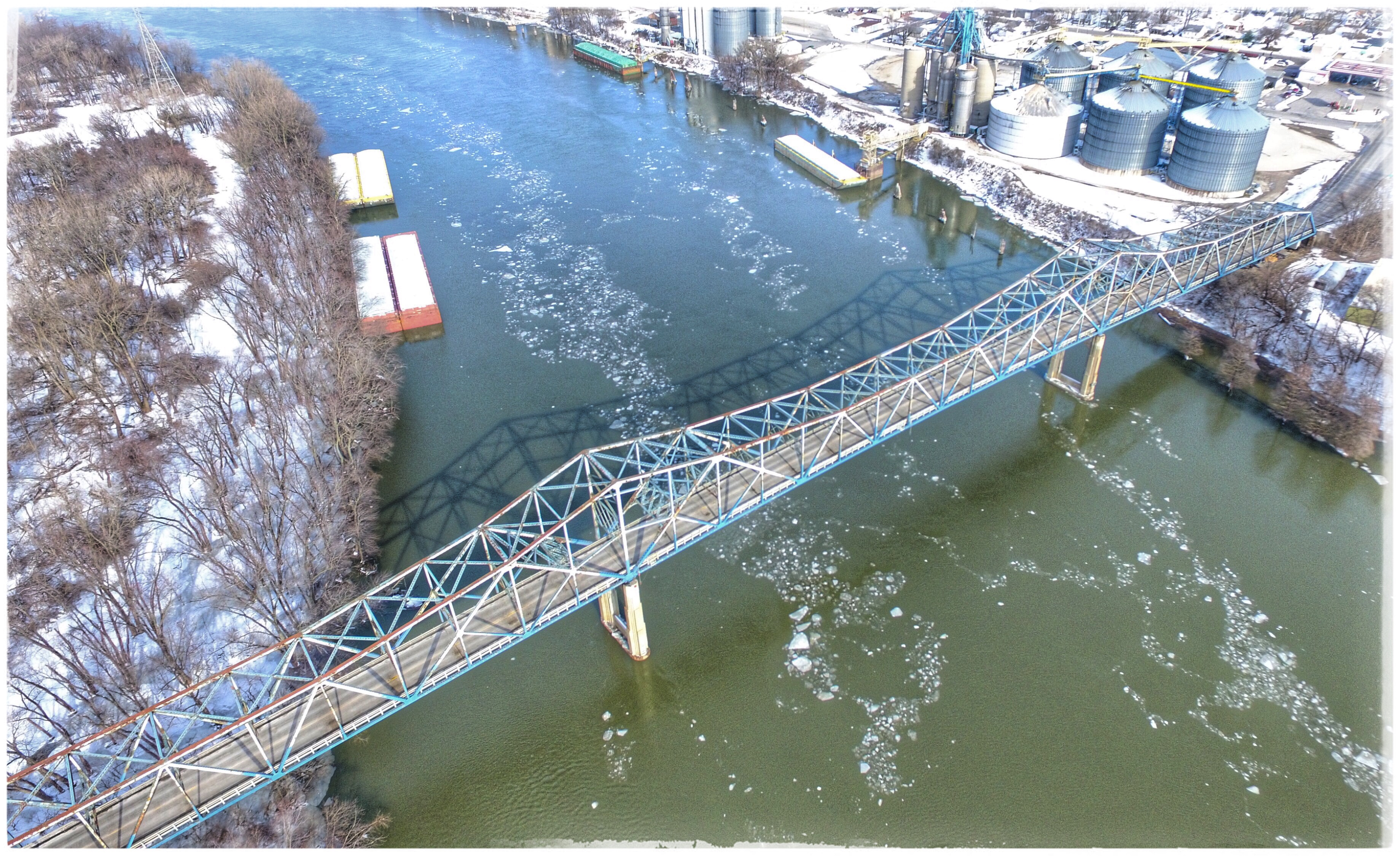
- Scott W. Lucas Bridge crossing the Illinois River in Havana, Illinois
- Coordinates: 40.294420°N 90.070027°W
- Carries: 2 lanes of US 136 / IL 78
- Crosses: Illinois River
- Locale: Havana, Illinois
- Other name: Havana Bridge
- Named for: Scott Wike Lucas
- Maintained by: Illinois Department of Transportation

Characteristics
- Design: Cantilever bridge
- Total length: 1,727.1 ft (526.4 m)
- Width: 28.5 ft (8.7 m)
- Clearance above: 16.5 ft (5.0 m)

History
- Opened: 1936

Statistics
- Daily traffic: 5,650

Location
- Interactive map of Scott Wike Lucas Bridge

The Scott Wike Lucas Bridge is a bridge located in the community of Havana, Illinois. It carries U.S. Route 136 over the Illinois River. Named after a former politician, it was constructed in 1936 and reconstructed over 60 years later.
