= Lock and Dam No. 21 =

Dam in Illinois and Missouri, U.S.

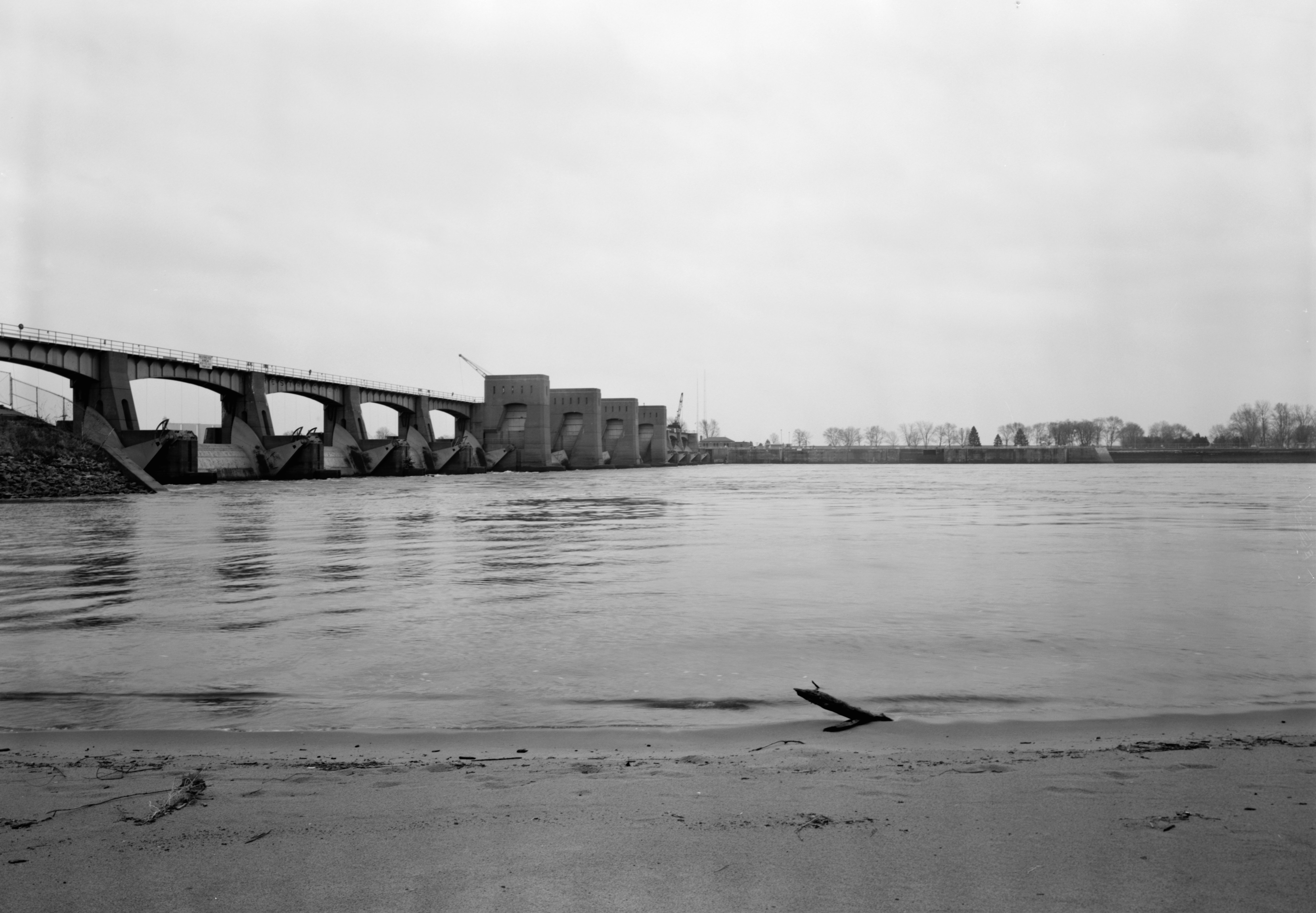
- Mississippi River Lock and Dam number 21
- Interactive map of Lock and Dam No. 21
- Location: Melrose Township, Adams County, Illinois / Fabius Township, Marion County, Missouri, near Quincy, Illinois, USA
- Coordinates: 39°54′21.97″N 91°25′55.87″W
- Construction began: 1933
- Opening date: July 23, 1938
- Operators: U.S. Army Corps of Engineers, Rock Island District

Dam and spillways
- Impounds: Upper Mississippi River
- Length: 1,265 feet (385.6 m) (movable portion)

Reservoir
- Creates: Pool 21
- Total capacity: 62,000 acre⋅ft (0.076 km^{3})
- Catchment area: 135,000 mi^{2} (350,000 km^{2})
- Lock and Dam No. 21 Historic District
- U.S. National Register of Historic Places
- U.S. Historic district
- Location within Illinois Location within the United States
- Location: 0.5 mi. W of IL 57, Quincy, Illinois
- Area: 107.5 acres (43.5 ha)
- Built: 1938
- Architect: US Army Corps of Engineers; Abbott, Edwin E., et al.
- MPS: Upper Mississippi River 9-Foot Navigation Project MPS
- NRHP reference No.: 04000181
- Added to NRHP: March 10, 2004

Lock and Dam No. 21 is a lock and dam located at Quincy, Illinois on the Upper Mississippi River around river mile 324.9. The movable portion of the dam is 1,265 feet (385.6 m) long and consists of three roller gates and ten tainter gates. A 1,400 feet (426.7 m) long submersible dike continues to the Missouri shore. The main lock is 110 feet (33.5 m) wide by 600 feet (182.9 m) long and there is also an incomplete auxiliary lock. In 2004, the facility was listed in the National Register of Historic Places as Lock and Dam No. 21 Historic District, #04000181 covering 1,075 acres (4.4 km^{2}), 1 building, 4 structures, 4 objects.

Currently there is a study being conducted by the city of Quincy to convert Lock & Dam No. 21, 20, and 22 into being hydroelectric by 2016.

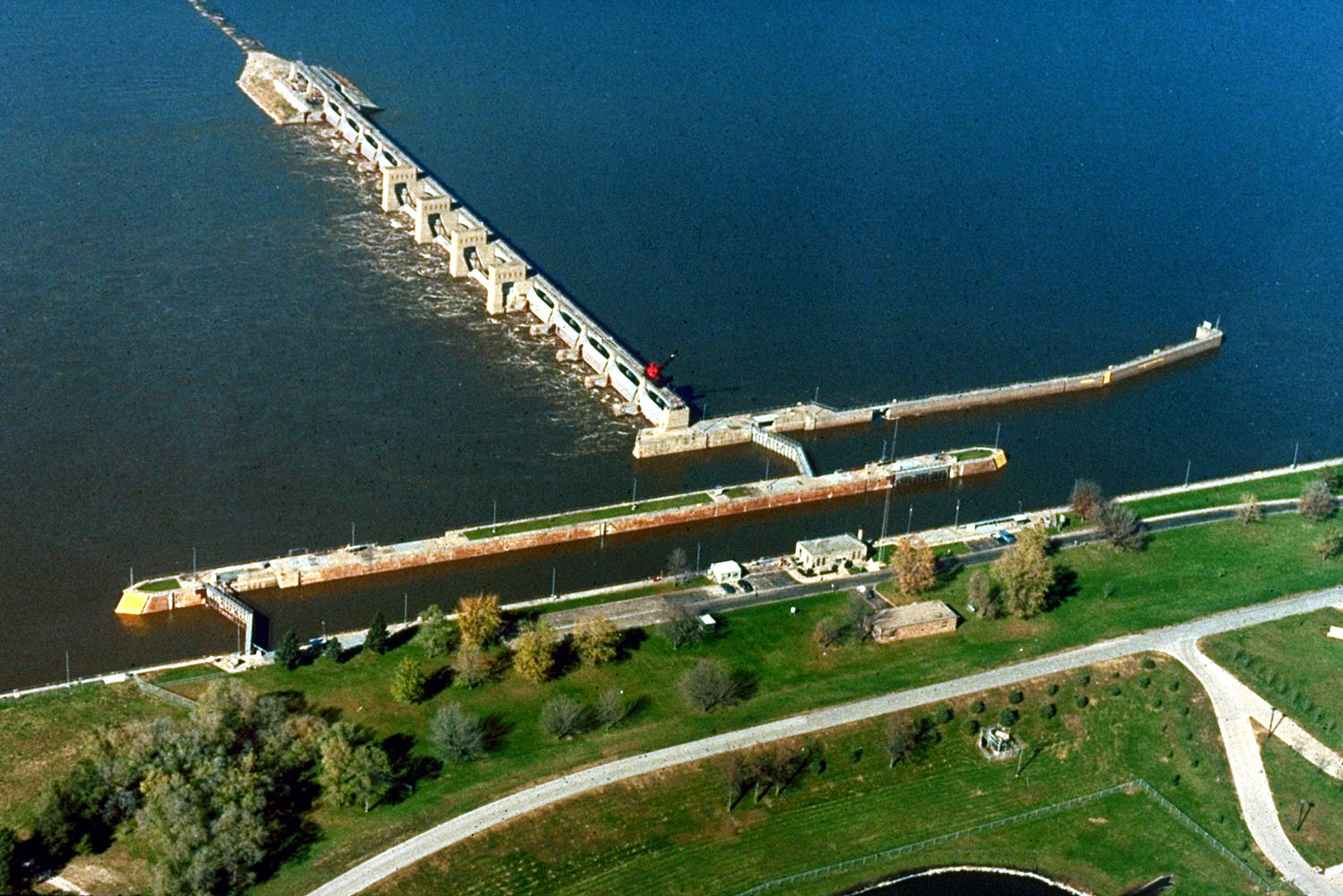
Lock and Dam 21. View is from the Illinois side of the river, looking upriver to the north.

== See also ==
- Public Works Administration dams list
