= Buckheart Township, Fulton County, Illinois =

Buckheart Township
- Township
- Location in Fulton County

- Fulton County's location in Illinois
- Coordinates: 40°29′44″N 90°02′53″W
- Country: United States
- State: Illinois
- County: Fulton
- Established: November 6, 1849

Area
  - Total: 35.73 sq mi (92.5 km^{2})
  - Land: 34.76 sq mi (90.0 km^{2})
  - Water: 0.97 sq mi (2.5 km^{2}) 2.71%
- Elevation: 620 ft (190 m)

Population (2020)
  - Total: 1,315
  - Density: 37.83/sq mi (14.61/km^{2})
- Time zone: UTC-6 (CST)
  - Summer (DST): UTC-5 (CDT)
- ZIP codes: 61427, 61519, 61520, 61542
- FIPS code: 17-057-09265

Buckheart Township is one of twenty-six townships in Fulton County, Illinois, USA. As of the 2020 census, its population was 1,315 and it contained 725 housing units.

== Geography ==
According to the 2021 census gazetteer files, Buckheart Township has a total area of 35.73 square miles (92.54 km^{2}), of which 34.76 square miles (90.03 km^{2}) (or 97.29%) is land and 0.97 square miles (2.51 km^{2}) (or 2.71%) is water.

=== Cities, towns, villages ===
- Canton (partial)
- Dunfermline
- St. David
- Bryant
- Hooty (small mining community which no longer exists).

=== Major highways ===
- Illinois Route 95
- Illinois Route 97
- Illinois Route 100

=== Lakes ===
- Fisher Lake
- Frog Lake
- Long Lake
- Mason Lake
- Rose Lake
- Stevens Lake
- Swimming Lake
- Traer Lake
- Woods Lake

== Demographics ==
As of the 2020 census there were 1,315 people, 624 households, and 466 families residing in the township. The population density was 36.80 inhabitants per square mile (14.21/km^{2}). There were 725 housing units at an average density of 20.29 per square mile (7.83/km^{2}). The racial makeup of the township was 94.37% White, 0.46% African American, 0.30% Native American, 0.38% Asian, 0.00% Pacific Islander, 0.15% from other races, and 4.33% from two or more races. Hispanic or Latino of any race were 0.91% of the population.

There were 624 households, out of which 29.80% had children under the age of 18 living with them, 58.81% were married couples living together, 9.94% had a female householder with no spouse present, and 25.32% were non-families. 22.00% of all households were made up of individuals, and 11.10% had someone living alone who was 65 years of age or older. The average household size was 2.47 and the average family size was 2.81.

The township's age distribution consisted of 18.6% under the age of 18, 12.1% from 18 to 24, 27.6% from 25 to 44, 24.3% from 45 to 64, and 17.4% who were 65 years of age or older. The median age was 41.1 years. For every 100 females, there were 91.6 males. For every 100 females age 18 and over, there were 82.2 males.

The median income for a household in the township was $56,207, and the median income for a family was $82,500. Males had a median income of $45,357 versus $31,045 for females. The per capita income for the township was $27,272. About 7.1% of families and 11.0% of the population were below the poverty line, including 14.8% of those under age 18 and 3.7% of those age 65 or over.

Historical population
Census	Pop.	Note	%±
2000	1,529		—
2010	1,484		−2.9%
2020	1,315		−11.4%
U.S. Decennial Census

== School districts ==
- Community Unit School District 3 Fulton City
- Lewistown School District 97
- Canton Union School District 66

== Political districts ==
- Illinois's 17th congressional district
- State House District 91
- State Senate District 46
