= Illinois Route 97 =

State highway in western Illinois, US

Illinois Route 97
- IL 97 highlighted in red

Route information
- Maintained by IDOT
- Length: 104.43 mi (168.06 km)
- Existed: 1937–present

Major junctions
- South end: I-55 / I-72 / US 36 in Springfield
- US 136 / IL 78 in Havana; US 24 / IL 78 in Lewistown
- North end: US 150 in Knoxville

Location
- Country: United States
- State: Illinois
- Counties: Sangamon, Menard, Mason, Fulton, Knox

Highway system
- Illinois State Highway System; Interstate; US; State; Tollways; Scenic
| ← IL 96 | → IL 98 |

Illinois Route 97 (IL 97) is a north–south state highway in the central and western portions of the U.S. state of Illinois. It extends from I-55 Business (Business Loop I-55) in Springfield northwest to U.S. Highway 150 (US 150) near Galesburg. It crosses over the Illinois River on a bridge west of Havana. This is a distance of 102.23 miles (164.52 km).

== Route description ==
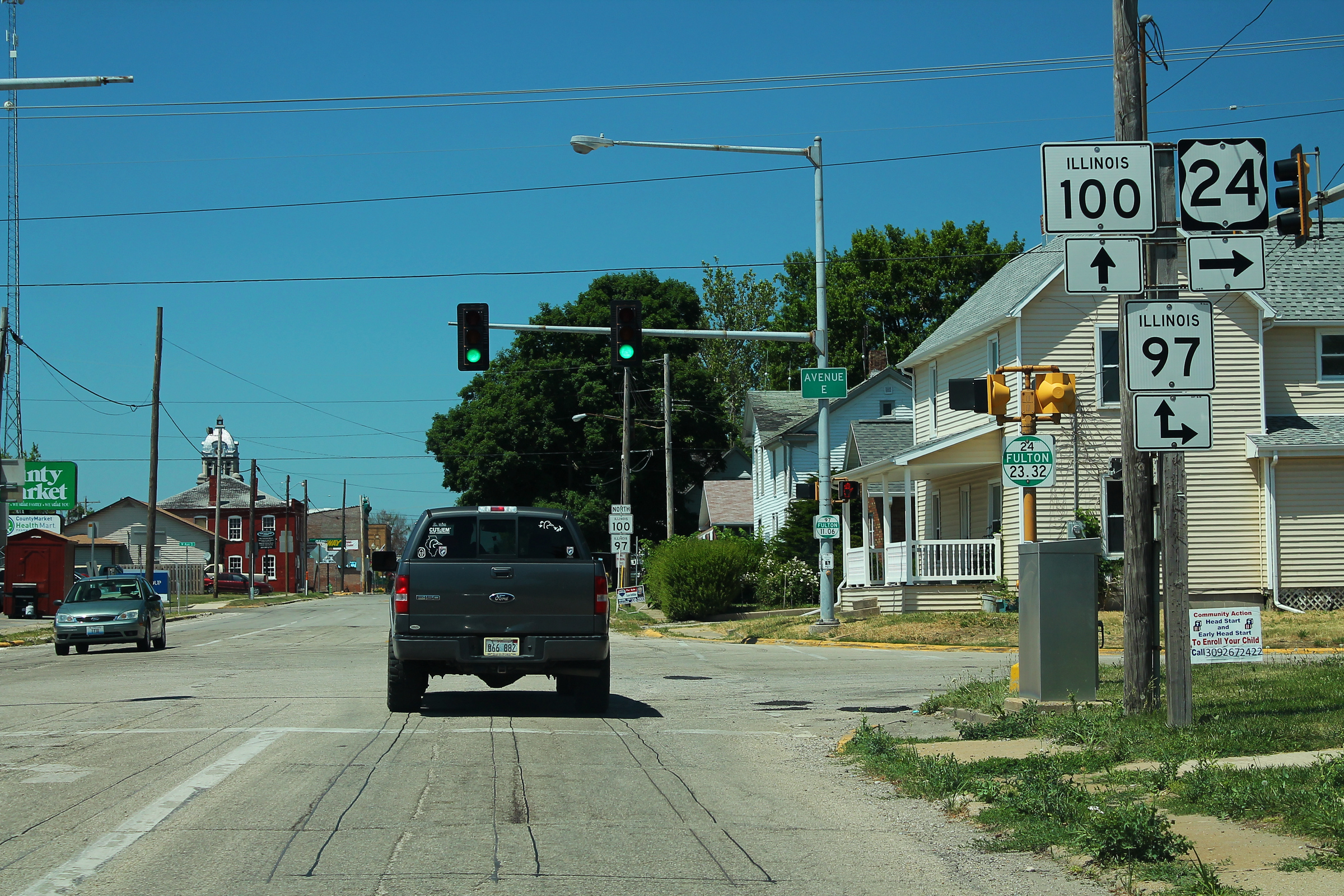
IL 97 intersecting with US 24/IL 100 in Lewistown

IL 97 starts off in Springfield on East Clear Lake Avenue. It heads west, forming a concurrency with IL 125. IL 97 splits off and north shortly after, entering Menard County.

In Menard County, along a concurrency with IL 123 in New Salem, it passes Lincoln's New Salem State Historic Site near Petersburg, the home of Abraham Lincoln in the 1830s. It afterwards passes through Mason County. The road enters Fulton County immediately after crossing a bridge concurrent with US 136 and IL 78.

It then passes both the Emiquon National Wildlife Refuge and Dickson Mounds State Memorial. Afterwards, it drops the concurrency with IL 78 and US 136 but picks up US 24. During and after it gains concurrency with IL 100, it heads north throughout hills. It enters Knox County after a brief concurrency with IL 9. It continues north through hills until its northern terminus at US 150 near Galesburg.

== History ==
IL 97 is the site of a pioneering work of highway beautification, the planting in 1934 of what was once a line of 'red haw' hawthorns and other Illinois native trees along the tourist route from west of Springfield to New Salem. The work, done by the Civilian Conservation Corps and the Illinois Federation of Garden Clubs, is commemorated by a marker installation at Tallula Junction, the southern intersection of Illinois Route 97 and Illinois Route 123.

== Major junctions ==
| County | Location | mi | km | Destinations | Notes |
|---|---|---|---|---|---|
| Sangamon | Springfield | 0.0 | 0.0 | I-55 / I-72 / US 36 – Chicago, Decatur | No control city for southbound I-55/westbound I-72; US 36 is not signed |
| Sangamon | Springfield | 0.5 | 0.80 | IL 29 | |
| Sangamon | Springfield | 2.2 | 3.5 | I-55 BL | |
| Sangamon | Springfield | 3.6 | 5.8 | Walnut Street | Grade separation eastbound; at-grade intersection westbound |
| Sangamon | Springfield | 5.8 | 9.3 | IL 4 – Chatham, Mason City | |
| Menard | | 20.1 | 32.3 | IL 123 / CR 4 | South end of IL 123 overlap; called Tallula Junction; has IL-97 historical marker |
| Menard | Petersburg | 25.1 | 40.4 | IL 123 | North end of IL 123 overlap |
| Mason | Havana | 49.3 | 79.3 | US 136 | South end of US 136 overlap |
| Mason | Havana | 49.8 | 80.1 | IL 78 | South end of IL 78 overlap |
| Fulton | | 50.8 | 81.8 | US 136 / IL 78 | North end of US 136 overlap |
| Fulton | | 57.5 | 92.5 | US 24 / IL 78 | South end of US 24 overlap; north end of IL 78 overlap |
| Fulton | Lewistown | 61.0 | 98.2 | US 24 / IL 100 / CR 14 | South end of IL 100 overlap; north end of US 24 overlap |
| Fulton | Lewistown | 62.5 | 100.6 | IL 100 | North end of IL 100 overlap |
| Fulton | | 73.9 | 118.9 | IL 9 / CR 16 | South end of IL 9 overlap |
| Fulton | | 75.9 | 122.1 | IL 9 | North end of IL 9 overlap |
| Fulton | Rapatee | 86.1 | 138.6 | IL 116 | |
| Knox | Knoxville | 101.9 | 164.0 | US 150 to I-74 | |
1.000 mi = 1.609 km; 1.000 km = 0.621 mi: Concurrency terminus
