= Bloomfield, Illinois =

Bloomfield, Illinois may refer to:

- Bloomfield, Adams County, Illinois, an unincorporated community in Adams County, Illinois
- Bloomfield, Edgar County, Illinois, an unincorporated community in Edgar County, Illinois
- Bloomfield, Johnson County, Illinois, an unincorporated community in Johnson County, Illinois
- Bloomfield, Scott County, Illinois, an unincorporated community in Scott County, Illinois
