= Bryant, Illinois =

- Village
- Location of Bryant in Fulton County, Illinois.

- Location of Illinois in the United States
- Coordinates: 40°27′56″N 90°05′42″W
- Country: United States
- State: Illinois
- County: Fulton
- Township: Buckheart
- Established: 1862
- Named after: Henry L. Bryant

Area
  - Total: 0.25 sq mi (0.64 km^{2})
  - Land: 0.25 sq mi (0.64 km^{2})
  - Water: 0 sq mi (0.00 km^{2})
- Elevation: 620 ft (190 m)

Population (2020)
  - Total: 168
  - Density: 678.6/sq mi (262.02/km^{2})
- Time zone: UTC-6 (CST)
  - Summer (DST): UTC-5 (CDT)
- Postal code: 61519
- Area code: 309
- FIPS code: 17-09161
- GNIS ID: 2397480
- Wikimedia Commons: Bryant, Illinois

Bryant is a village in Fulton County, Illinois, United States. The population was 168 at the 2020 census, down from 255 at the 2000 census. The village was struck by an EF-3 tornado on April 4, 2023.

== Geography ==
Bryant is located in east-central Fulton County. Illinois Route 100 passes through the village, leading northeast 8 miles (13 km) to Canton and southwest 6 miles (10 km) to Lewistown, the county seat.

According to the 2010 census, Bryant has a total area of 0.23 square miles (0.60 km^{2}), all land.

== History ==
Bryant's post office was established on June 26, 1862. It was likely named for Forsyth Mining Company director Henry L. Bryant. The current village president is Robert Kaufmann.

== Demographics ==
Historical population
Census	Pop.	Note	%±
1880	449		—
1890	309		−31.2%
1900	355		14.9%
1910	237		−33.2%
1920	482		103.4%
1930	442		−8.3%
1940	387		−12.4%
1950	396		2.3%
1960	346		−12.6%
1970	326		−5.8%
1980	333		2.1%
1990	273		−18.0%
2000	255		−6.6%
2010	220		−13.7%
2020	168		−23.6%
U.S. Decennial Census

As of the 2020 census there were 168 people, 86 households, and 63 families residing in the village. The population density was 677.42 inhabitants per square mile (261.55/km^{2}). There were 101 housing units at an average density of 407.26 per square mile (157.24/km^{2}). The racial makeup of the village was 96.43% White, 0.00% African American, 0.60% Native American, 0.00% Asian, 0.00% Pacific Islander, 0.00% from other races, and 2.98% from two or more races. Hispanic or Latino of any race were 0.00% of the population.

There were 86 households, out of which 41.9% had children under the age of 18 living with them, 58.14% were married couples living together, 6.98% had a female householder with no husband present, and 26.74% were non-families. 24.42% of all households were made up of individuals, and 4.65% had someone living alone who was 65 years of age or older. The average household size was 2.92 and the average family size was 2.62.

The village's age distribution consisted of 26.7% under the age of 18, 9.3% from 18 to 24, 23.6% from 25 to 44, 30.6% from 45 to 64, and 9.8% who were 65 years of age or older. The median age was 39.8 years. For every 100 females, there were 122.8 males. For every 100 females age 18 and over, there were 98.8 males.

The median income for a household in the village was $47,188, and the median income for a family was $95,750. Males had a median income of $50,750 versus $26,250 for females. The per capita income for the village was $29,394. About 6.3% of families and 12.9% of the population were below the poverty line, including 1.7% of those under age 18 and 9.1% of those age 65 or over.
