= Waterford Township, Fulton County, Illinois =

Waterford Township
- Township
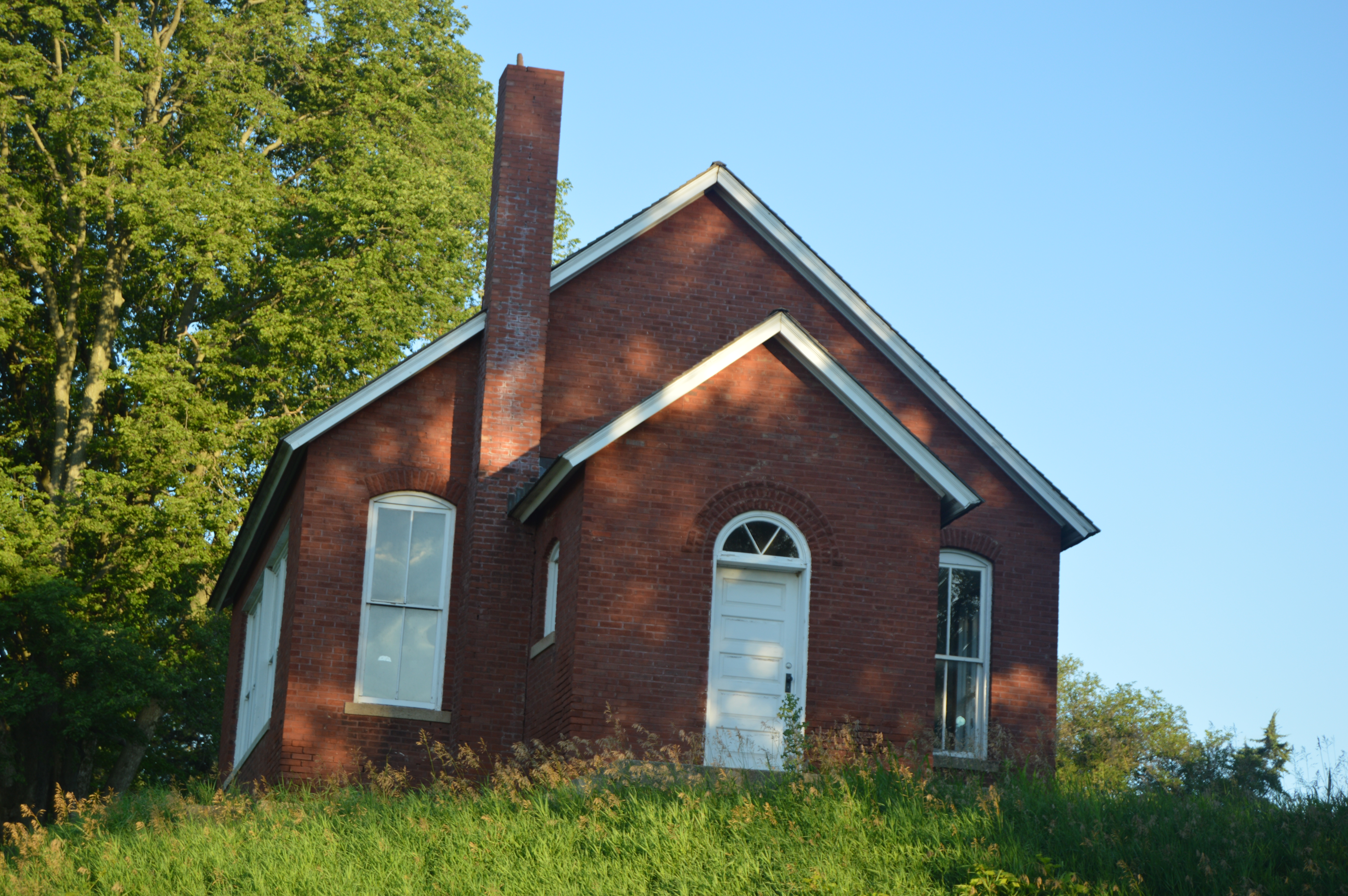
- The former East Waterford School

- Location in Fulton County

- Fulton County's location in Illinois
- Coordinates: 40°20′49″N 90°06′36″W
- Country: United States
- State: Illinois
- County: Fulton
- Established: November 6, 1849

Area
  - Total: 21.17 sq mi (54.8 km^{2})
  - Land: 20.96 sq mi (54.3 km^{2})
  - Water: 0.21 sq mi (0.54 km^{2}) 1.01%
- Elevation: 446 ft (136 m)

Population (2020)
  - Total: 173
  - Density: 8.25/sq mi (3.19/km^{2})
- Time zone: UTC-6 (CST)
  - Summer (DST): UTC-5 (CDT)
- ZIP codes: 61542
- FIPS code: 17-057-79137

Waterford Township is one of twenty-six townships in Fulton County, Illinois, USA. As of the 2020 census, its population was 173 and it contained 83 housing units.

== Geography ==
According to the 2021 census gazetteer files, Waterford Township has a total area of 21.17 square miles (54.83 km^{2}), of which 20.96 square miles (54.29 km^{2}) (or 98.99%) is land and 0.21 square miles (0.54 km^{2}) (or 1.01%) is water.

=== Unincorporated towns ===
- Sepo at 40.343654°N 90.119286°W

(This list is based on USGS data and may include former settlements.)

=== Extinct towns ===
- Waterford at 40.338931°N 90.129841°W

(These towns are listed as "historical" by the USGS.)

=== Cemeteries ===
The township contains the main Waterford Cemetery. Also family cemeteries:Ames Cemetery and the Ashby cemetery

=== Major highways ===
- U.S. Route 24
- Illinois Route 78
- Illinois Route 100

=== Airports and landing strips ===
- G Bray Airport
- Norris Farms Airport

=== Landmarks ===
- Dickson Mounds State Park

== Demographics ==
As of the 2020 census there were 173 people, 38 households, and 38 families residing in the township. The population density was 8.17 inhabitants per square mile (3.15/km^{2}). There were 83 housing units at an average density of 3.92 per square mile (1.51/km^{2}). The racial makeup of the township was 97.11% White, 0.58% African American, 0.00% Native American, 0.00% Asian, 0.00% Pacific Islander, 0.00% from other races, and 2.31% from two or more races. Hispanic or Latino of any race were 0.58% of the population.

There were 38 households, out of which 36.80% had children under the age of 18 living with them, 63.16% were married couples living together, 0.00% had a female householder with no spouse present, and none were non-families. No households were made up of individuals, and none had someone living alone who was 65 years of age or older. The average household size was 2.66 and the average family size was 2.29.

The township's age distribution consisted of 10.9% under the age of 18, 13.9% from 18 to 24, 41.6% from 25 to 44, 33.7% from 45 to 64, and 0.0% who were 65 years of age or older. The median age was 36.2 years. For every 100 females, there were 165.8 males. For every 100 females age 18 and over, there were 136.8 males.

Males had a median income of $45,893 versus $29,583 for females. The per capita income for the township was $36,114. None of the population was below the poverty line.

Historical population
Census	Pop.	Note	%±
2000	188		—
2010	187		−0.5%
2020	173		−7.5%
U.S. Decennial Census

== School districts ==
- Lewistown School District 97

== Political districts ==
- Illinois's 17th congressional district
- State House District 94
- State Senate District 47
