= St. David, Illinois =

- Village
- Location of St. David in Fulton County, Illinois.

- Location of Illinois in the United States
- Coordinates: 40°29′30″N 90°3′7″W
- Country: United States
- State: Illinois
- County: Fulton
- Township: Buckheart
- Founded: July 25, 1885

Government
  - Village President: Rosella Wells

Area
  - Total: 0.30 sq mi (0.77 km^{2})
  - Land: 0.30 sq mi (0.77 km^{2})
  - Water: 0 sq mi (0.00 km^{2})
- Elevation: 630 ft (190 m)

Population (2020)
  - Total: 522
  - Density: 1,745.3/sq mi (673.88/km^{2})
- Time zone: UTC-6 (CST)
  - Summer (DST): UTC-5 (CDT)
- ZIP Code(s): 61563
- Area code: 309
- FIPS code: 17-66768
- Wikimedia Commons: St. David, Illinois

St. David is a village in Fulton County, Illinois, United States. The population was 522 at the 2020 census.

== Geography ==
St. David is located in eastern Fulton County at 40°29′30″N 90°3′7″W (40.491796, -90.051958). Illinois Route 100 runs along the southeast edge of the village, leading southwest 10 miles (16 km) to Lewistown, the county seat. Canton, the largest city in Fulton County, is 5 miles (8 km) to the northeast via IL 100 and IL 78.

According to the 2021 census gazetteer files, St. David has a total area of 0.30 square miles (0.78 km^{2}), all land.

=== Local attractions ===
There are two parks in town. The Veterans Park located on Main Street contains a ball diamond (named in honor of John Perardi), playground area and the Village Memorial Board. 40 Acres Park is located on the western side of town and contains a ball diamond and memorial for Rodney Yurkovich, who spent much of his life coaching baseball teams that played on this diamond. It is also the location of the Village Hall.

== Demographics ==
Historical population
Census	Pop.	Note	%±
1900	481		—
1910	915		90.2%
1920	1,189		29.9%
1930	977		−17.8%
1940	859		−12.1%
1950	812		−5.5%
1960	862		6.2%
1970	773		−10.3%
1980	786		1.7%
1990	603		−23.3%
2000	587		−2.7%
2010	589		0.3%
2020	522		−11.4%
U.S. Decennial Census

As of the 2020 census there were 522 people, 242 households, and 161 families residing in the village. The population density was 1,745.82 inhabitants per square mile (674.06/km^{2}). There were 266 housing units at an average density of 889.63 per square mile (343.49/km^{2}). The racial makeup of the village was 94.25% White, 0.77% African American, 0.19% Native American, 0.00% Asian, 0.00% Pacific Islander, 0.19% from other races, and 4.60% from two or more races. Hispanic or Latino of any race were 0.57% of the population.

There were 242 households, out of which 33.1% had children under the age of 18 living with them, 41.32% were married couples living together, 19.42% had a female householder with no husband present, and 33.47% were non-families. 27.27% of all households were made up of individuals, and 13.64% had someone living alone who was 65 years of age or older. The average household size was 2.74 and the average family size was 2.31.

The village's age distribution consisted of 22.3% under the age of 18, 7.3% from 18 to 24, 29.1% from 25 to 44, 21.3% from 45 to 64, and 20.0% who were 65 years of age or older. The median age was 39.6 years. For every 100 females, there were 101.4 males. For every 100 females age 18 and over, there were 92.5 males.

The median income for a household in the village was $45,288, and the median income for a family was $42,292. Males had a median income of $42,500 versus $22,083 for females. The per capita income for the village was $22,670. About 16.8% of families and 19.7% of the population were below the poverty line, including 27.0% of those under age 18 and 3.6% of those age 65 or over.

== Government ==
St. David is the home to the Buckheart Township government offices and garage. The township supervisor is Joseph Yurkovich.

The village government consists of a board of trustees, Village President (Mayor), Village Clerk, treasurer, Ordinance and Zoning Officer, attorney. The village had a contract with the Fulton County Sheriff to patrol and enforce the laws.

- Village President: Jason Myetich
- Village Clerk: Missy Towery
- Village Board of Trustees: Betty Brown, Robert Crotzer, Terry Davis, Michael Keithley, Cheryle Mathis, Steve Nebergall
- Village Treasurer: Julie Russell
- Village Attorney: Andrewe Johnson
- Village Ordinance & Zoning Officer: Tim Woods
- Village Street Supervisor: Dave Vaughn
