= Marshall State Fish and Wildlife Area =

State park in Illinois, USA

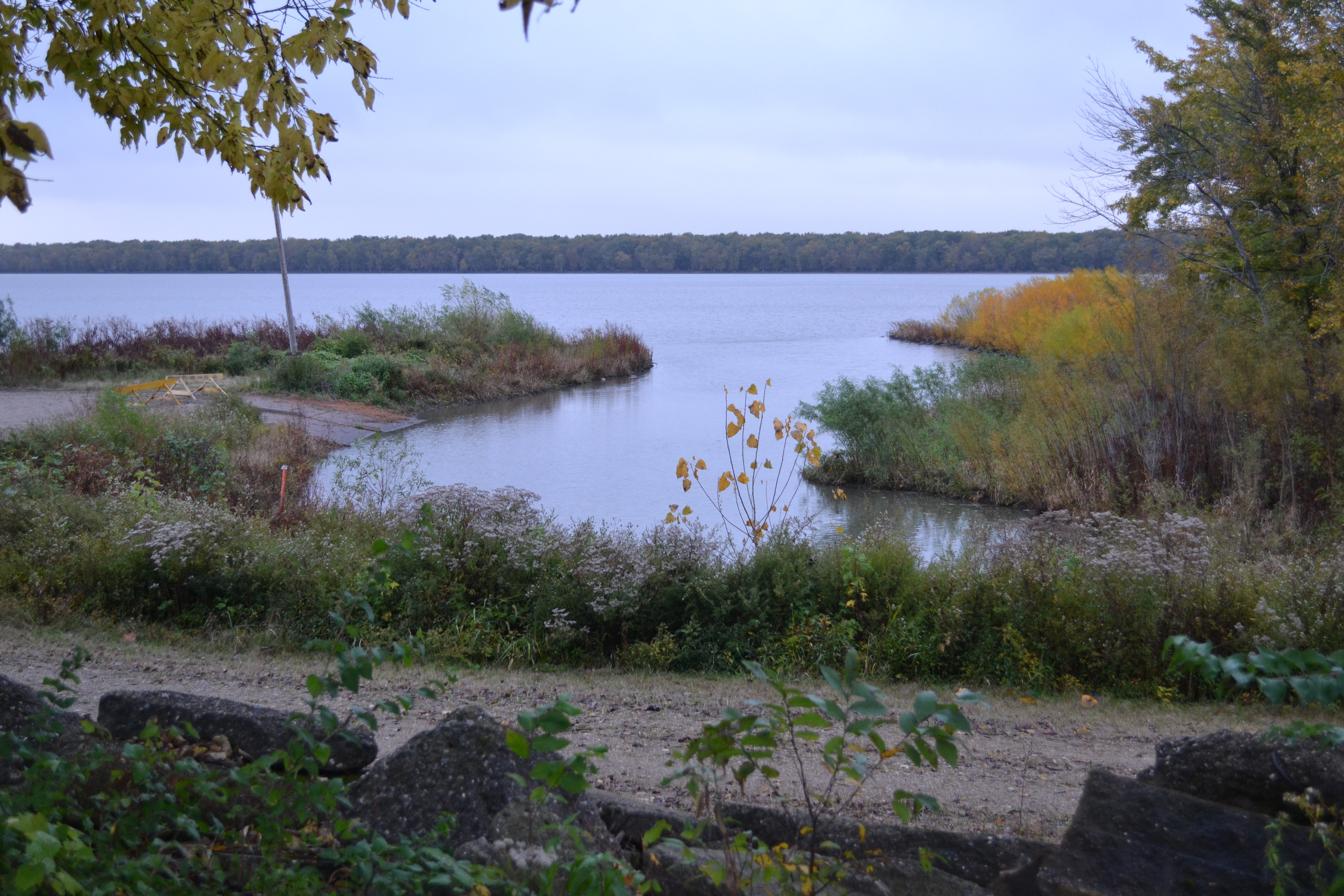
- Overlooking Babb Slough at Marshall State Fish and Wildlife Area

- Location within Illinois
- Location: Marshall County, Illinois, USA
- Nearest city: Lacon, Illinois
- Coordinates: 40°59′27″N 89°25′50″W
- Area: 6,000 acres (2,400 ha)
- Established: 1925
- Governing body: Illinois Department of Natural Resources

Marshall State Fish and Wildlife Area is an Illinois state park on 6,000 acres (2,400 ha) in Marshall County, Illinois, United States.

== Natural features ==
The land for the Marshall State Fish and Wildlife Area was first purchased in 1925. It has since grown to approximately 6,000 acres (2,400 ha), half land and half water. Terrain types include ravines, bluffs, bottomland lakes, islands, sloughs, and upland forest.

The bluffs contain hardwood timber of oaks, hickories, and walnuts with wildflowers and shrubs. Wildlife includes red squirrels, gray squirrels, flying squirrels, white-tailed deer, rabbits, and other woodland species native to Illinois. Songbirds, owls, hawks, woodpeckers, and other woodland species are common types of birds.

Most of the terrain is bottomland forest and backwater lakes. Cottonwood, silver maple, and willow are common types of trees in low-lying areas and islands. Deer, fox, raccoon, muskrat, mink, and beaver can be found here. Waterfowl still frequent the area during migration, although heavy siltation makes the site less attractive to them. The wood duck nests during the summer. Great blue heron and eagles can be spotted fishing in the shallow waters.

== Units ==
The Marshall Unit (3,000 acres (1,200 ha)) contains the headquarters, campground, boat ramp, fishing channel, hunter check station, and hiking trails. It is located on the east side of the Illinois River along IL 26.

The Spring Beach Unit (1,642 acres (664 ha), of which 537 acres (217 ha) are water) is located on the west side of the Illinois River between Sparland and Chillicothe along IL 29. It has a 6-acre picnic area, fishing, hunting, and hiking trails.

The Sparland Unit (1,280 acres (520 ha), of which 1,110 acres (450 ha) are water) is primarily a waterfowl hunting and fishing area along IL 29 near Sparland. With shallow backwater, boat access is difficult during low water levels.

The Aitchison Waterfowl Refuge, located on the south end of Bab Slough, is also part of the Marshall SFWA.

The Duck Ranch unit is a waterfowl hunting area.

== Recreation ==
=== Boating ===
There is a free boat ramp and no horsepower limit. Backwater lakes can be shallow and nearly impassable during low water, even by paddleboat.

=== Fishing ===
Fishing on the Illinois River and backwaters, as well as a half-mile man-made channel, is popular. Common species include bluegill, crappie, bullhead, channel catfish, and largemouth bass.

=== Hunting ===
The site has huntable 5,807 acres (2,350 ha). Outdoor Illinois Journal recommends a special surface drive or a mud motor to access blind sites on the open water, islands, and peninsulas. Blinds are assigned by draw or daily lottery. Duck Ranch hunters are assigned a pond where they can assemble their own blind.

=== Hiking ===
A 3.5 mi (5.6 km) hiking and cross-country ski trail is available for public use in the Marshall Unit. There are no hiking trails at the Spring Branch Unit.

=== Camping ===
Tent and trailer spaces with electricity and water are available with a camping permit. Canoe camping is permitted on the islands, except during waterfowl hunting season.

=== Picnicking ===
Day-use picnic areas are available. The Spring Beach unit has tables, shelters, and stoves, but no drinking water is available. The Marshall unit also has a picnic area.
