= Illinois Route 104 =

State highway in Illinois, US

Illinois Route 104
- IL 104 highlighted in red

Route information
- Maintained by IDOT
- Length: 125.91 mi (202.63 km)
- Existed: 1924–present

Major junctions
- West end: US 24 / IL 57 in Quincy
- I-172 / IL 110 (CKC) in Quincy; US 67 / IL 100 in Meredosia; US 67 in Jacksonville; I-55 in Pawnee
- East end: IL 29 in Taylorville

Location
- Country: United States
- State: Illinois
- Counties: Adams, Pike, Morgan, Sangamon, Christian

Highway system
- Illinois State Highway System; Interstate; US; State; Tollways; Scenic
← IL 103	→ IL 105

Illinois Route 104 is a state highway in central and western Illinois. It extends from Illinois Route 29 near Taylorville, west over the Illinois River at Meredosia to its western terminus in downtown Quincy. This is a distance of 125.91 miles (202.63 km).

== Route description ==
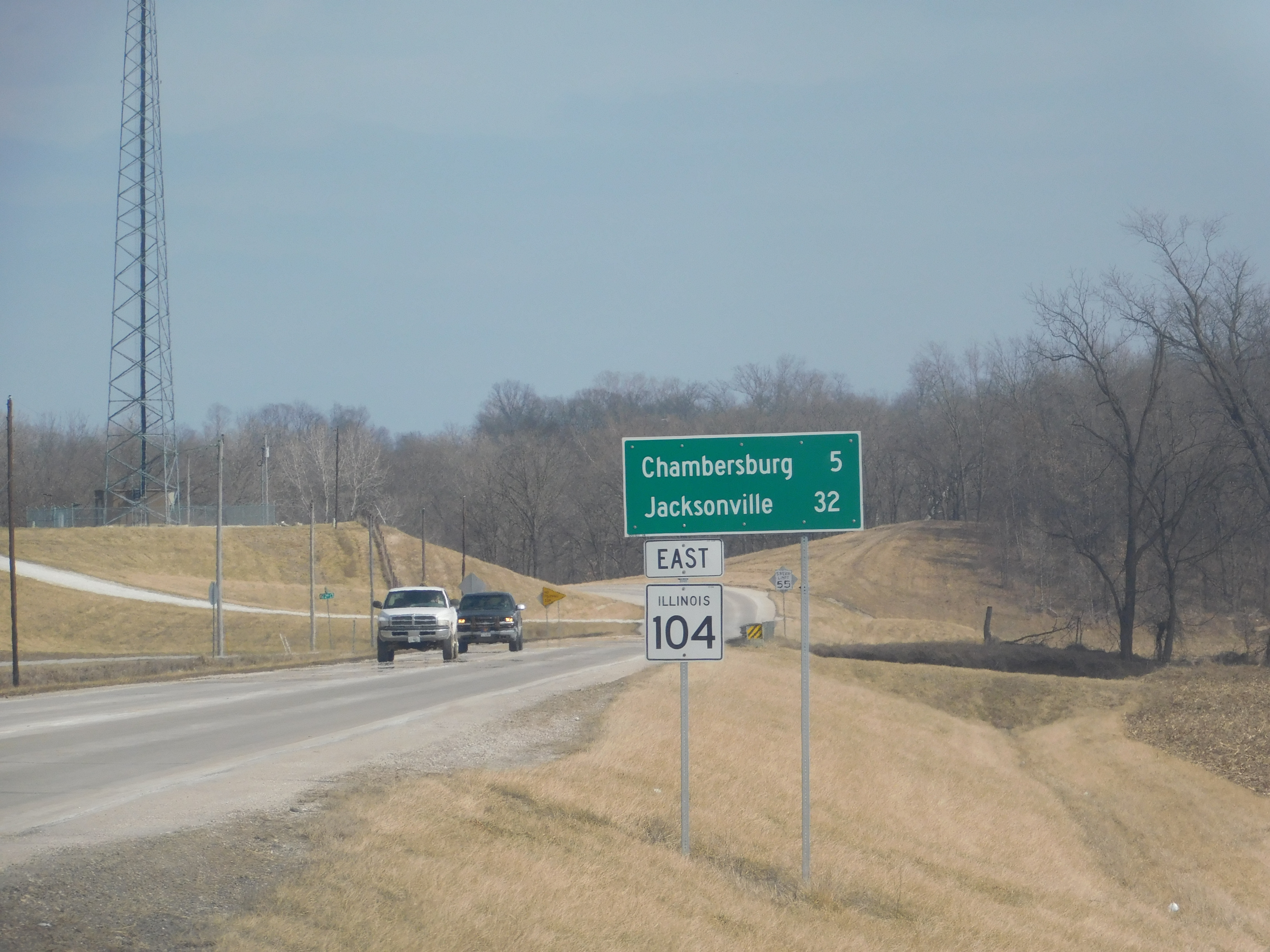
IL 104 after IL 107

Illinois 104 crosses Interstate 55 at Exit 82 near Pawnee, and crosses Interstate 172 at Exit 14 near Quincy. The road also crosses Interstate 72 near Jacksonville, but there is no interchange at this crossing.

Illinois 104 doubles as the primary east–west street within the municipality of Quincy, Illinois. Called Broadway Street, the highway carries traffic up and down the Mississippi River bluffs that divide the city.

In Jacksonville, Illinois 104 intersects the new U.S. Route 67 Jacksonville Bypass and follows portions of the new Business U.S. 67 through the city. Northwest of the city, Illinois 104 and U.S. 67 are concurrent for 13 miles (21 km).

=== Points of interest ===
Points of interest along the road include:

- Illinois College, Jacksonville, Ill., one of the oldest colleges in Illinois (1829) .
- Quincy National Cemetery, Quincy, Ill. (1870); 582 interments, including 221 Union soldiers buried before 1882 .

== History ==
Prior to 1937, Illinois 104 had run from Mount Sterling on what is now Illinois Route 99 to Taylorville on modern Illinois 104. After 1937, the route took its current routing.

== Major Intersections ==
County	Location	mi	km	Destinations	Notes
Adams	Quincy	0.0	0.0	US 24 west / IL 57 south – Missouri	One-way pair
Adams	Quincy	0.1	0.16	US 24 east	One-way pair
Adams	Quincy	1.8	2.9	IL 96	
Adams	Quincy	4.6	7.4	I-172 / IL 110 (CKC) – Carthage, Macomb, Hannibal	I-172 exit 14
Pike		40.1	64.5	IL 107 – Mt. Sterling, Perry, Griggsville	
Pike		49.1	79.0	IL 99 north – Mt. Sterling	
Morgan		53.1	85.5	US 67 north / IL 100 north – Beardstown	West end of US 67/IL 100 concurrency
Morgan		54.0	86.9	IL 100 south	East end of IL 100 concurrency
Morgan		66.7	107.3	US 67 south / US 67 Bus. – Springfield, Alton	East end of US 67 concurrency; west end of US 67 Business concurrency
Morgan		67.8	109.1	IL 78 north – Jacksonville, Virginia	
Morgan	Jacksonville	69.9	112.5	I-72 BL west	West end of I-72 Business concurrency
Morgan	Jacksonville	72.3	116.4	US 67 Bus. south / IL 267 south	East end of US 67 Business concurrency
Morgan	Jacksonville	73.7	118.6	I-72 BL east	East end of I-72 Business concurrency
Morgan	Waverly	90.7	146.0	IL 111 south – Alton	
Sangamon	Auburn	101.5	163.3	IL 4 – Springfield, Virden	
Sangamon		107.2	172.5	Historic US 66 east – East St. Louis	
Sangamon		107.5	173.0	I-55 / Historic US 66 west – Springfield, East St. Louis	I-55 exit 82, eastern end of Historic US 66 concurrency
Christian	Taylorville	125.91	202.63	IL 29 – Springfield, Taylorville	
1.000 mi = 1.609 km; 1.000 km = 0.621 mi: Concurrency terminus
