= Melrose Township, Clark County, Illinois =

Melrose Township
- Township
- Location in Clark County

- Clark County's location in Illinois
- Coordinates: 39°12′59″N 87°44′03″W
- Country: United States
- State: Illinois
- County: Clark
- Established: November 7, 1854

Area
  - Total: 32.99 sq mi (85.4 km^{2})
  - Land: 32.91 sq mi (85.2 km^{2})
  - Water: 0.08 sq mi (0.21 km^{2}) 0.24%
- Elevation: 531 ft (162 m)

Population (2020)
  - Total: 301
  - Density: 9.15/sq mi (3.53/km^{2})
- Time zone: UTC-6 (CST)
  - Summer (DST): UTC-5 (CDT)
- ZIP codes: 62441, 62442, 62477, 62478
- FIPS code: 17-023-48229

Melrose Township is one of fifteen townships in Illinois, United States. As of the 2020 census, the population is 301 and it has 146 housing units.

== Geography ==
According to the 2010 census, the township has a total area of 32.99 square miles (85.4 km^{2}), of which 32.91 square miles (85.2 km^{2}) (or 99.76%) is land and 0.08 square miles (0.21 km^{2}) (or 0.24%) is water.

=== Unincorporated towns ===
(This list is based on USGS data and may include former settlements.)

=== Lakes ===
- Craig Lake

== Demographics ==
As of the 2020 census there were 301 people, 172 households, and 131 families residing in the township. The population density was 9.13 inhabitants per square mile (3.53/km^{2}). There were 146 housing units at an average density of 4.43 per square mile (1.71/km^{2}). The racial makeup of the township was 98.01% White, 0.33% African American, 0.00% Native American, 0.00% Asian, 0.00% Pacific Islander, 0.00% from other races, and 1.66% from two or more races. Hispanic or Latino of any race were 0.00% of the population.

There were 172 households, out of which 36.60% had children under the age of 18 living with them, 61.63% were married couples living together, 2.91% had a female householder with no spouse present, and 23.84% were non-families. 23.80% of all households were made up of individuals, and 16.30% had someone living alone who was 65 years of age or older. The average household size was 2.51 and the average family size was 2.98.

The township's age distribution consisted of 25.1% under the age of 18, 9.5% from 18 to 24, 26% from 25 to 44, 23.7% from 45 to 64, and 15.8% who were 65 years of age or older. The median age was 39.4 years. For every 100 females, there were 106.2 males. For every 100 females age 18 and over, there were 109.7 males.

The median income for a family in the township was $75,450. Males had a median income of $39,250 versus $36,477 for females. The per capita income for the township was $28,693. About 6.1% of families and 4.4% of the population were below the poverty line, including 2.8% of those under age 18 and 5.9% of those age 65 or over.

Historical population
Census	Pop.	Note	%±
2010	352		—
2020	301		−14.5%
U.S. Decennial Census

== School districts ==
- Hutsonville Community Unit School District 1
- Marshall Community Unit School District 2c
- Martinsville Community Unit School District 3c

== Political districts ==
- Illinois' 15th congressional district
- State House District 109
- State Senate District 55
