= Little America, Illinois =

- Unincorporated community
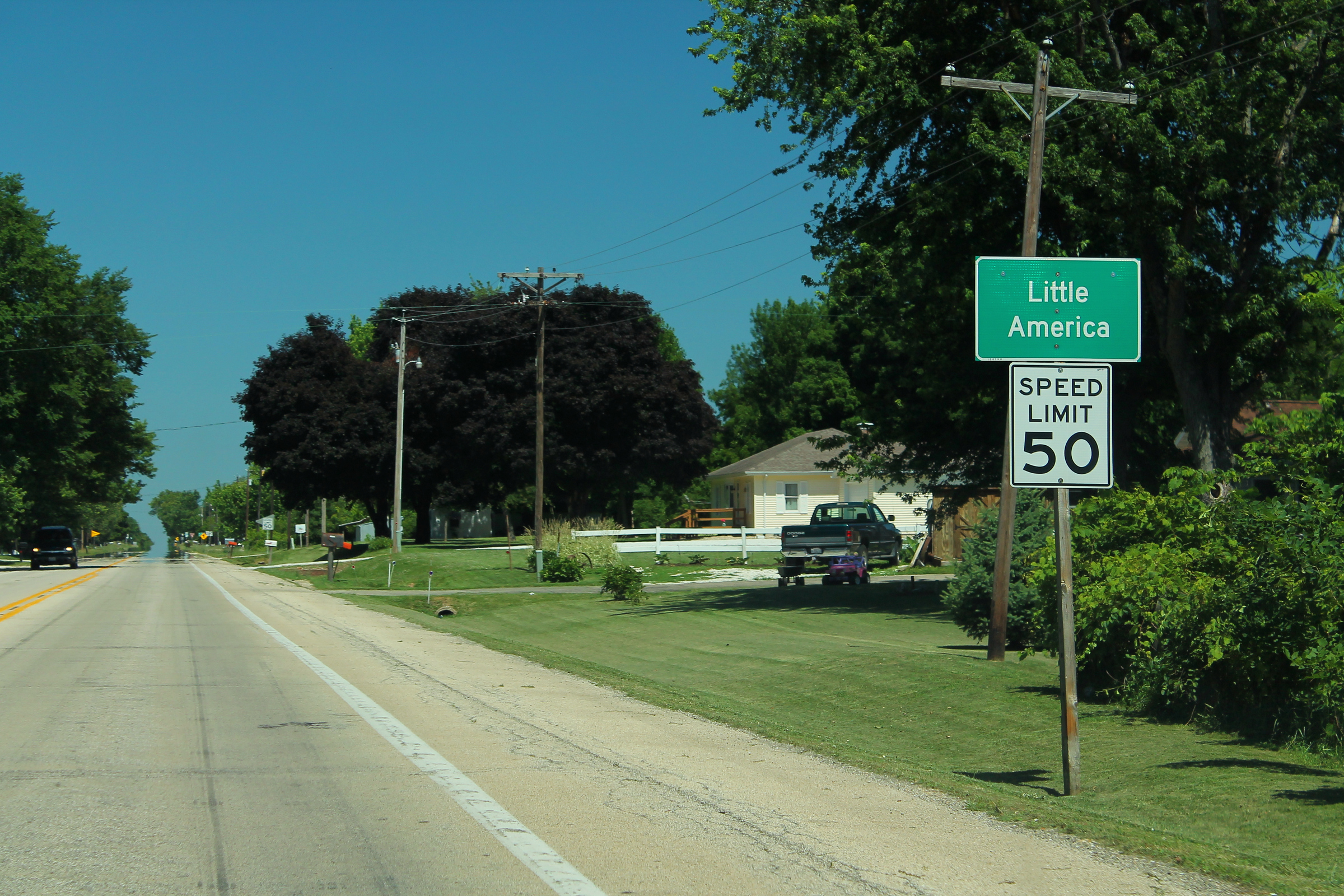
- Entering Little America, Illinois on U.S. Route 24.

- Location within Illinois
- Coordinates: 40°24′21″N 90°02′04″W
- Country: United States
- State: Illinois
- County: Fulton
- Elevation: 574 ft (175 m)
- Time zone: UTC-6 (Central (CST))
  - Summer (DST): UTC-5 (CDT)
- Area code: 309
- GNIS feature ID: 412276

Little America is an unincorporated community in Fulton County, Illinois, United States. The community is located at the junction of Illinois Route 78 and U.S. Route 24, east of Lewistown. Little America is about 2 miles (3.2 km) from the Illinois River.
