= Hull, Illinois =

Hull
- Village
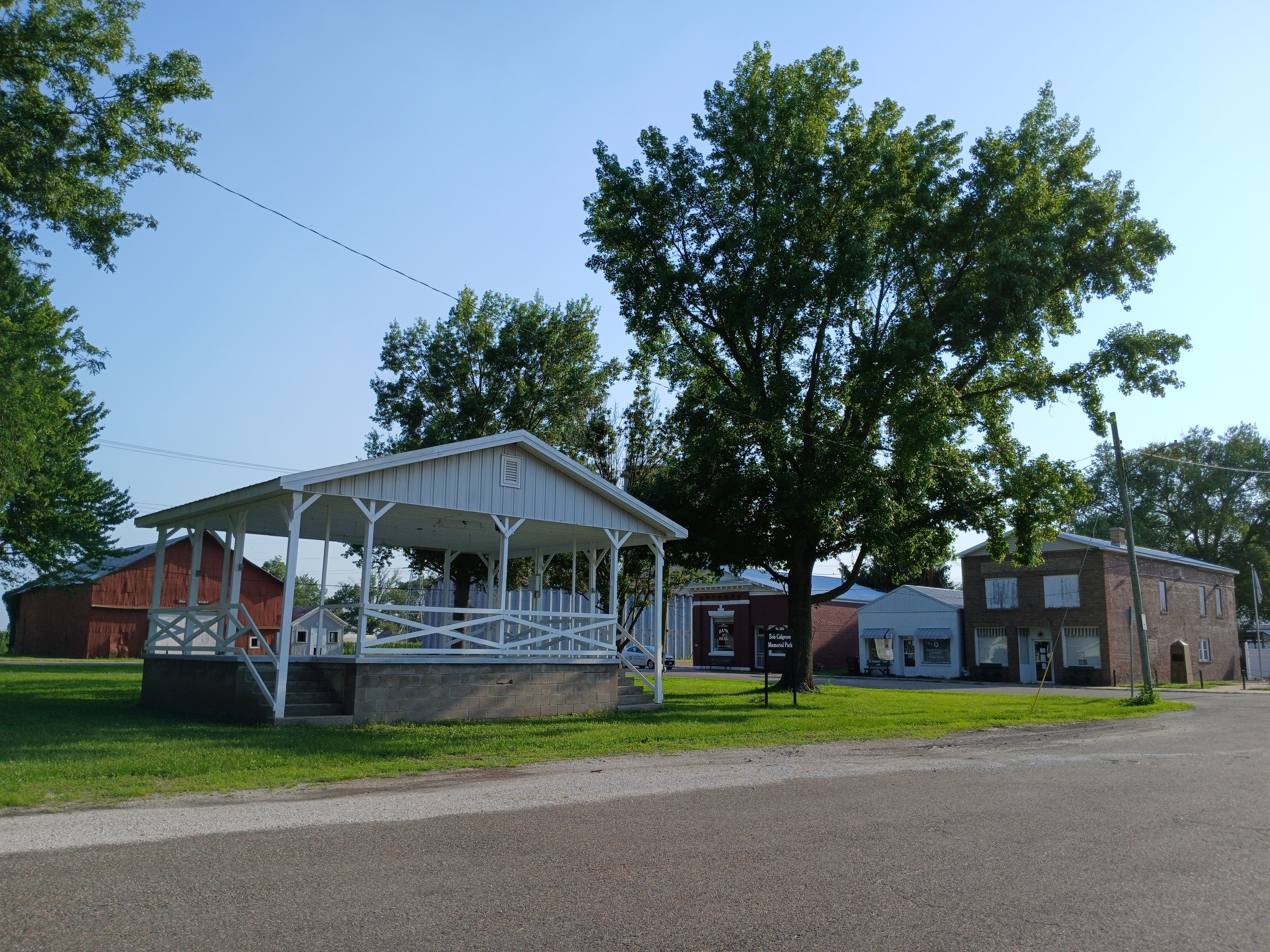
- Central Hull, July 2024

- Location of Hull in Pike County, Illinois.
- Coordinates: 39°42′31″N 91°12′12″W
- Country: United States
- State: Illinois
- County: Pike

Area
  - Total: 1.84 sq mi (4.76 km^{2})
  - Land: 1.83 sq mi (4.73 km^{2})
  - Water: 0.012 sq mi (0.03 km^{2})
- Elevation: 469 ft (143 m)

Population (2020)
  - Total: 392
  - Density: 214.8/sq mi (82.93/km^{2})
- Time zone: UTC-6 (CST)
  - Summer (DST): UTC-5 (CDT)
- ZIP code: 62343
- Area code: 217
- FIPS code: 17-36516
- GNIS feature ID: 2398558

Hull is a village in Pike County, Illinois, United States. The population was 392 at the 2020 census, a decline from 461 in 2010.

== Geography ==
According to the 2010 census, Hull has a total area of 1.851 square miles (4.79 km^{2}), of which 1.84 square miles (4.77 km^{2}) (or 99.41%) is land and 0.011 square miles (0.03 km^{2}) (or 0.59%) is water.

== Demographics ==
Historical population
| Census | Pop. | Note | %± |
|---|---|---|---|
| 1880 | 95 | | — |
| 1900 | 500 | | — |
| 1910 | 541 | | 8.2% |
| 1920 | 648 | | 19.8% |
| 1930 | 554 | | −14.5% |
| 1940 | 572 | | 3.2% |
| 1950 | 489 | | −14.5% |
| 1960 | 535 | | 9.4% |
| 1970 | 585 | | 9.3% |
| 1980 | 529 | | −9.6% |
| 1990 | 514 | | −2.8% |
| 2000 | 474 | | −7.8% |
| 2010 | 461 | | −2.7% |
| 2020 | 392 | | −15.0% |
U.S. Decennial Census

As of the census of 2000, there were 474 people, 192 households, and 130 families residing in the village. The population density was 258.2 inhabitants per square mile (99.7/km^{2}). There were 213 housing units at an average density of 116.0 per square mile (44.8/km^{2}). The racial makeup of the village was 99.16% White, 0.63% Native American, and 0.21% from two or more races.

There were 192 households, out of which 29.7% had children under the age of 18 living with them, 55.7% were married couples living together, 10.4% had a female householder with no husband present, and 31.8% were non-families. 28.6% of all households were made up of individuals, and 12.0% had someone living alone who was 65 years of age or older. The average household size was 2.47 and the average family size was 3.05.

In the village, the population was spread out, with 24.9% under the age of 18, 8.9% from 18 to 24, 28.1% from 25 to 44, 21.5% from 45 to 64, and 16.7% who were 65 years of age or older. The median age was 37 years. For every 100 females, there were 96.7 males. For every 100 females age 18 and over, there were 95.6 males.

The median income for a household in the village was $28,281, and the median income for a family was $34,464. Males had a median income of $27,375 versus $18,906 for females. The per capita income for the village was $13,821. About 15.6% of families and 16.4% of the population were below the poverty line, including 24.4% of those under age 18 and 13.3% of those age 65 or over.
