= Dickson Mounds =

Native American historical site in Illinois, U.S.

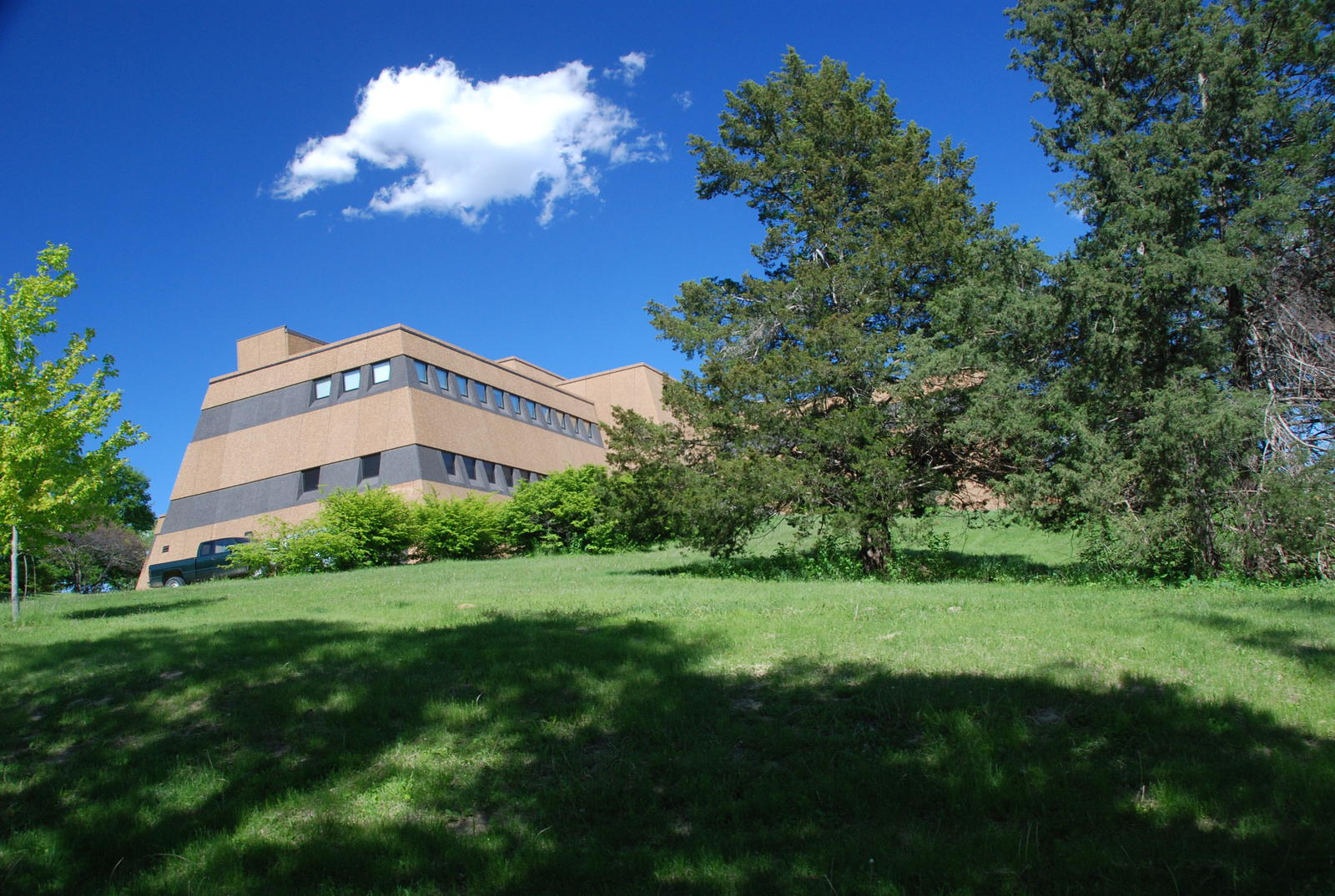
- Museum at the site

- Location in Illinois today
- 40°21′2.16″N 90°6′57.24″W
- Cultures: Middle Mississippian culture
- Location: Lewistown, Illinois, Fulton County, Illinois, USA
- Region: Fulton County, Illinois

History
- Built: 800 CE
- Abandoned: 1250 CE

Site notes
- Architectural styles: burial mounds, platform mound
- Excavation dates: 1937
- Dickson Mounds
- U.S. National Register of Historic Places
- NRHP reference No.: 72000457
- Added to NRHP: May 5, 1972

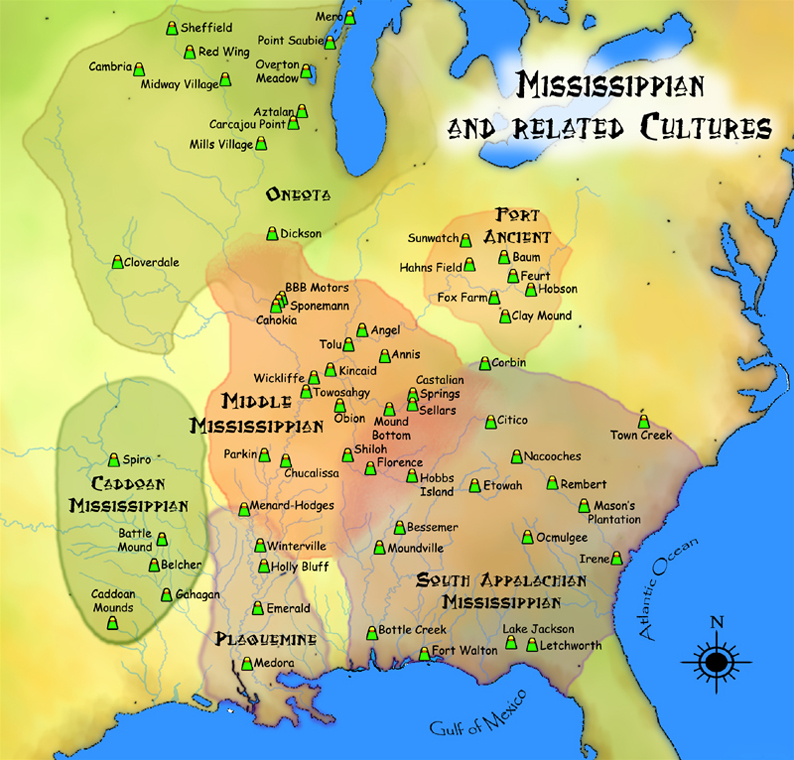
A map showing approximate areas of various Mississippian and related cultures. Dickson Mounds is located near the center of this map in the upper part of the Middle Mississippi area.

Dickson Mounds is a Native American settlement site and burial mound complex near Lewistown, Illinois. It is located in Fulton County on a low bluff overlooking the Illinois River. It is a large burial complex containing at least two cemeteries, ten superimposed burial mounds, and a platform mound. The Dickson Mounds site was founded by 800 CE and was in use until after 1250 CE. The site is named in honor of chiropractor Don Dickson, who began excavating it in 1927 and opened a private museum that formerly operated on the site. Its exhibition of the 237 uncovered skeletons displayed by Dickson was closed in 1992 by then-Gov. Jim Edgar.

Don Dickson was a chiropractor and discovered the burial mounds on his family farm. Instead of removing the bones, he only removed the dirt. He covered his excavation with a tent. He later replaced his tent with a building and set up a private museum.

The Dickson Mounds Museum is a museum erected on the site in 1972 by the U.S. state of Illinois; it describes the life cycles and culture of Native Americans living in the Illinois River valley over a period of 12,000 years since the last ice age. The museum is part of the Illinois State Museum system.

== Native life site ==
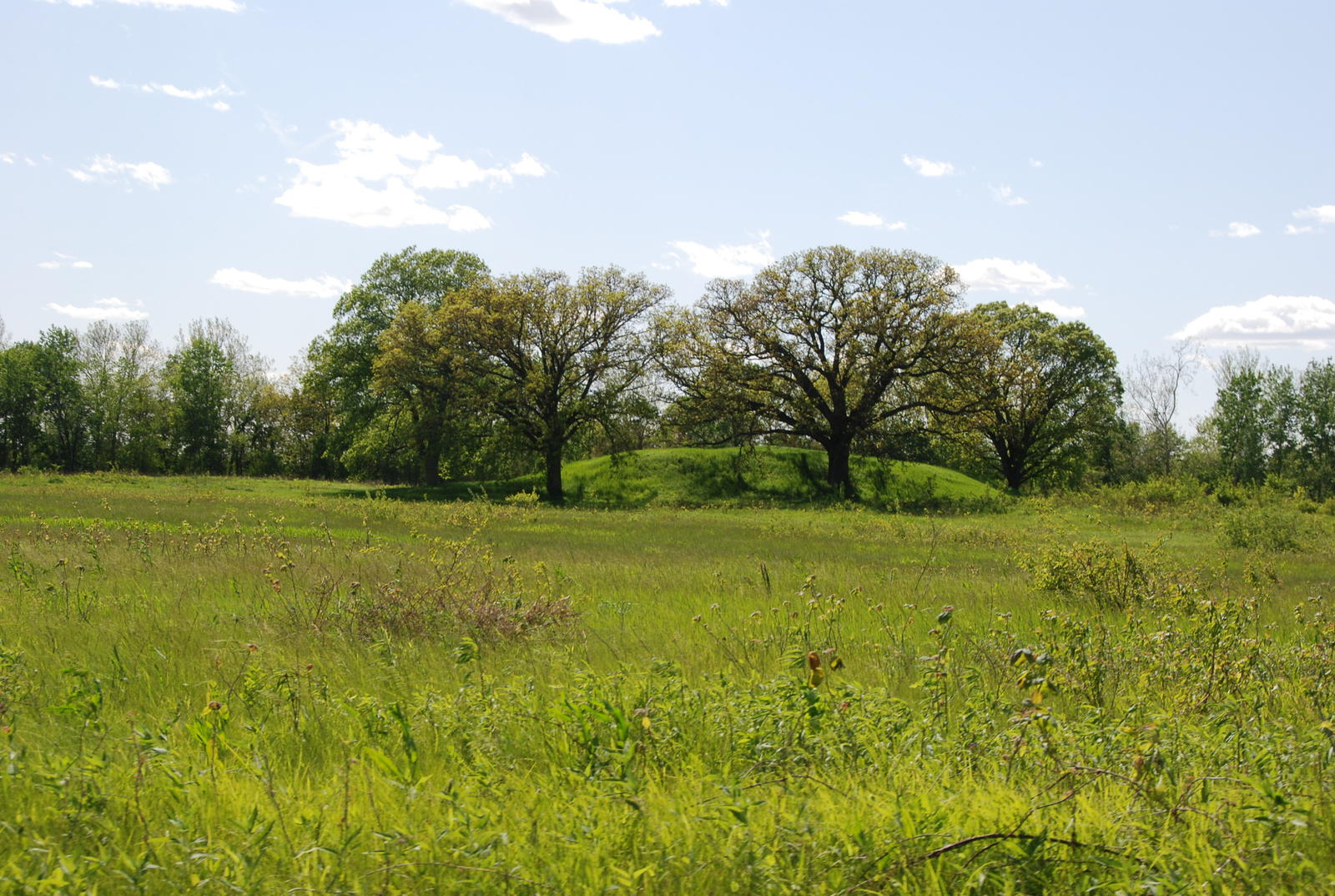
Ogden-Fettie Mound Group

While the members of most hunter-gatherer cultures travel extensively or even practice a nomadic lifestyle, the exceptional productivity of the Illinois River valley in fish, shellfish and game made it possible for semi-permanent settlements to develop. Archaeological examination of these sites have generated significant insights into the living conditions of Native Americans over time and the levels of technology they possessed.

A large parcel of the adjacent river bottomland is undergoing preservation and ecosystem restoration as part of the Emiquon Project. The Emiquon wetlands generated much of the food eaten by the people who lived on or near this blufftop site. In 2009, an excavation by Michigan State University turned up sherds of pottery, arrowheads and the foundations of houses and other structures that date back to about 1300 CE.

Some of the people who lived here were actually buried in Dickson Mounds itself. Their skeletons were excavated and displayed to the public from the 1930s until 1992, when in a controversial move the burial display was resealed due to Native American concerns. It is estimated that there are at least 3,000 burials at this site. The earlier burials were in mounds that were still being built as late as the ninth century, while later burials were in cemeteries. This exemplifies the shift away from the earlier focus on burial mounds as the monumental foci of communities lacking large settlements to the later emphasis on platform mounds at the center of towns. Mississippians decentralized cemeteries, making their communities rather than their burial places the center of their lives. "One group of four Mississippian people buried together appear to have been sacrificed at the Dickson Site". Their heads were removed and replaced by pots. This was not a practice that would have been common earlier.

After the sealing, the museum was renovated as a series of galleries that attempt to portray the history of the site. For example, the River Valley Gallery exhibition attempts to depict indigenous life patterns here since the close of the last Ice Age, while the "Reflections on Three Worlds" Gallery exhibition attempts to describe how scholars have used archeological findings to generate inductive evidence on the residents' life and culture.

Excavators left 248 burials in place after exposure, and these were long displayed inside a specially built museum enclosure. The American Indian objections to the display led to its closure in 1992. After that, three excavated dwellings now remain open to visitors at the site and the museum displays chronicle prehistoric life in the region.

== Health and lifestyle ==
Combined, the various burial sites at Dickson Mounds comprehensively represent all of the known eras of Native American culture in Illinois. Excavation and analysis of over eight hundred Native American skeletons from these burial sites indicate a transition from hunting and gathering to an agrarian economy and significant health changes in the population as a result of this transition. Earlier settlements at Dickson Mounds (950–1050 CE) indicate an economy based primarily on hunting and gathering. Hunting and gathering provided this population with a mixed and balanced diet. At this time, the population was small and autonomous, traded little with outsiders, and maintained only seasonal camps.

From 1050 to 1175, Dickson Mounds underwent a transitional phase, moving towards a mixed economy of hunting and gathering combined with agriculture, particularly the cultivation of maize. The population was also developing more permanent settlements and trade networks. From 1175 onward to about 1350, the population size expanded significantly and developed complex permanent settlements. These changes can be attributed to the increased reliance on agriculture and expansion of long-distance trade during this period.

The significant lifestyle changes from a small, nomadic, hunter-gatherer society to a large, sedentary, agrarian society resulted in major health changes among the population. After analyzing trends in bone growth, enamel development, lesions, and mortality, archaeologists determined that there was a major decline in health following the adoption and intensification of agriculture. Compared to the hunter-gatherers before them, skeletons of farmers at Dickson Mounds indicate a significant increase in enamel defects, iron-deficiency anemia, bone lesions, and degenerative spinal conditions.

The decline in health of Dickson Mounds’ population over time can be attributed to the increased reliance on agriculture, which led to a less varied and less nutritious diet, more strenuous physical labor in the fields, and more crowded permanent settlements that facilitated the spread of infectious diseases. Some also say the decline in health is due to the expansion of long-distance trade with larger economic systems, such as Cahokia, which resulted in exploitative relations in which residents of Dickson Mounds were giving away needed food for items of symbolic value.

== Social organization ==
Analysis of mortuary behavior from excavations of burial sites at Dickson Mounds provides important insight into the social organization of early Native Americans. Dickson Mounds was a hierarchically organized society. The particular objects an individual was buried with largely indicate his or her social status. For example, an abundance of tools, copper ornaments, and objects made from imported raw materials suggest high rank of an individual. Burials containing pots, spoons, and beads are much more common and indicate a modest social rank.

Age and sex were also visible determinants of status, which is uncommon in most hierarchically organized societies. Burials were clustered into distinct age-sex classes. For example, mature males with high-ranking status characterized one cluster of burials. Another cluster of burials contained individuals of younger age and lower status. Specific objects signified the status of the various age-sex groups. Whereas objects serving functional purposes (such as cutting or piercing) noted the status of men, cultural and religious artifacts along with ornamental items noted the status of females. Marine shells tended to note the status of children.

Deep class divisions in the society at Dickson Mounds are also apparent through analysis of the health and heights of the individual skeletons. For example, skeletons from burials show children of an elite class tended to be taller and healthier compared to children from lower classes. This is most probably due to better diets and less strenuous labor requirements among the elite class.

== Trade ==
Records show that Dickson Mounds was part of a complex trade network with many culturally diverse populations from the Plains area, the Caddoan area, and Cahokia by 1200 CE. In particular, Cahokia provided Dickson Mounds with luxury items such as copper ornaments and marine shell necklaces in exchange for food items such as meat and fish. The trade of foodstuffs for luxury goods required individuals at Dickson Mounds to generate a surplus of food, resulting in an intensification of agricultural production, which bore serious health and social consequences.

== Decline ==
The population at Dickson Mounds is said to have inexplicably vanished during the late thirteenth to mid fourteenth century. Possible reasons for the decline of Dickson Mounds are warfare, climate change, and widespread epidemics. Climate change may have had detrimental effects on agriculture, particularly the cultivation of maize, on which the population had become so dependent for subsistence and trade. The significant expansions of the population as well as trade increased contact and transfer of infectious diseases and could also be possible causes of decline.

== Commemoration ==
The site was listed on the U.S. National Register of Historic Places in 1972.

== See also ==
- List of Hopewell sites
- List of Mississippian sites
- List of burial mounds in the United States
- List of archaeological sites on the National Register of Historic Places in Illinois
