= List of crossings of the Illinois River =

This is a list of bridges and other crossings of the Illinois River from the Mississippi River upstream to the confluence of the Kankakee and Des Plaines Rivers.

Crossing	Carries	Location	Coordinates
Brussels Ferry		Point Pct., Calhoun Co. and Quarry Twp., Jersey Co. west of Grafton	38°57′54.69″N 90°29′41.40″W
Hardin Bridge	IL 16 / IL 100	Hardin	39°09′36.23″N 90°36′48.61″W
Kampsville Ferry	IL 108	Kampsville	39°17′59.04″N 90°36′20.78″W
Rail bridge	Kansas City Southern Railway originally Alton Railroad	Pearl	39°27′26.55″N 90°36′37.15″W
Florence Bridge	IL 100 / IL 106	Florence	39°37′57.30″N 90°36′26.36″W
Valley City Eagle Bridges	I-72 / US 36	Valley City	39°41′13.34″N 90°38′28.43″W
Rail bridge	Norfolk Southern Railway originally Wabash Railroad	Valley City	39°41′12.01″N 90°38′45.33″W
Rail bridge (removed 1959)	Wabash Railroad originally Northern Cross Railroad	Meredosia	39°49′34″N 90°33′51″W
Meredosia Bridge	IL 104	Meredosia	39°49′50.30″N 90°33′55.92″W
Beardstown Bridge	US 67 / IL 100	Beardstown	40°00′54.67″N 90°26′48.70″W
Rail bridge	BNSF Railway originally Chicago, Burlington and Quincy Railroad	Beardstown	40°01′22.61″N 90°26′00.42″W
Scott W. Lucas Bridge	US 136 / IL 78 / IL 97	Havana	40°17′38.92″N 90°04′08.24″W
Rail bridge	Union Pacific Railroad originally Chicago & North Western Railroad	Pekin	40°33′14.67″N 89°40′30.78″W
John T. McNaughton Bridge	IL 9	Pekin	40°34′25.07″N 89°39′15.43″W
Shade-Lohmann Bridge	I-474 / US 24	Bartonville and Creve Coeur	40°38′05.86″N 89°37′20.89″W
Rail bridge	Peoria and Pekin Union Railway; Tazewell and Peoria Railroad; Toledo, Peoria and Western Railway	Peoria and East Peoria	40°40′03.40″N 89°36′40.59″W
Cedar Street Bridge	IL 8 / IL 116 (and IL 29 until 2012)	Peoria and East Peoria	40°40′38.42″N 89°36′00.84″W
Bob Michel Bridge	IL 40	Peoria and East Peoria	40°41′04.33″N 89°35′30.45″W
Murray Baker Bridge	I-74 / IL 29	Peoria and East Peoria	40°41′16.29″N 89°35′00.13″W
McClugage Bridge	US 150 (and US 24 until 2012)	Peoria and East Peoria	40°43′11.08″N 89°32′40.27″W
Rail bridge	BNSF Railway originally Atchison, Topeka and Santa Fe Railway	Chillicothe	40°55′44.43″N 89°27′40.40″W
Lacon Bridge	IL 17	Sparland and Lacon	41°01′32.43″N 89°25′00.28″W
Henry Bridge	IL 18	Henry	41°06′29.89″N 89°21′07.68″W
Hennepin Bridge (removed 1969?)	IL 26	Hennepin	41°15′26.29″N 89°20′57.26″W
Gudmund "Sonny" Jessen Bridge	I-180 / IL 26	Hennepin	41°15′39.13″N 89°20′50.79″W
Rail bridge (removed ? date)	Norfolk Southern Railway originally New York Central Railroad Illinois Division Kankakee Belt Route	De Pue	41°18′50.87″N 89°16′43.02″W
Spring Valley Bridge	IL 89	Spring Valley	41°18′43.62″N 89°11′59.82″W
Peru Bridge	IL 251	Peru	41°19′25.80″N 89°07′12.48″W
Shippingsport Bridge	IL 351	LaSalle and Oglesby	41°18′52.05″N 89°05′30.57″W
Rail bridge	Buzzi Unicem Railspur originally Illinois Central Railroad	LaSalle and Oglesby	41°19′20.63″N 89°04′59.48″W
Abraham Lincoln Memorial Bridge	I-39 / US 51	LaSalle and Oglesby	41°19′29.35″N 89°04′37.43″W
Utica Bridge	IL 178	Utica	41°19′37.67″N 89°00′38.31″W
Ottawa Rail Bridge	Illinois Railway formerly BNSF Railway and Chicago, Burlington and Quincy Railroad	Ottawa	41°19′22.85″N 88°42′36.61″W
Veterans Memorial Bridge	IL 23 / IL 71	Ottawa	41°19′22.85″N 88°42′36.61″W
Marseilles Bridge	LaSalle County Highway 15 (Main Street)	Marseilles	41°20′32.22″N 88°50′27.04″W
Seneca Bridge	IL 170	Seneca	41°17′56.80″N 88°36′33.01″W
Seneca Rail Bridge	CSX Transportation formerly Kankakee and Seneca Railroad, jointly owned by Chicago, Rock Island and Pacific Railroad and Cleveland, Cincinnati, Chicago and St. Louis Railway	Seneca	41°18′21.53″N 88°35′9.29″W
Morris Bridge	IL 47	Morris	41°21′13.44″N 88°25′17.39″W
Rail lift bridge	Elgin, Joliet and Eastern Railway	Aux Sable Twp., Grundy Co.	

Upstream, the Illinois River starts as the merger of the Des Plaines River and the Kankakee River.

== See also ==
- List of crossings of the Upper Mississippi River
- List of crossings of the Lower Mississippi River
