= Money Creek =

Money Creek may refer to:

== Communities ==
United States

- Money Creek Township, McLean County, Illinois
- Money Creek Township, Houston County, Minnesota
- Money Creek, Minnesota, an unincorporated community

== Streams ==
- Money Creek (Illinois), a stream in Illinois
- Money Creek (Root River), a stream in Minnesota
- Money Creek (Washington), a stream in Washington

== See also ==
- Money Run (West Virginia)
