= Shippingsport Bridge =

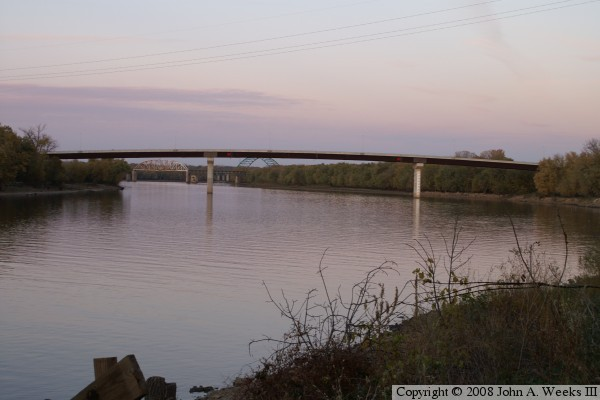
- The 2003 Shippingsport Bridge from the west
- Coordinates: 41.314368°N 89.091641°W
- Carries: Two lanes of IL 351
- Crosses: Illinois River
- Locale: LaSalle, Illinois and Oglesby, Illinois
- Official name: Shippingsport Bridge
- Maintained by: Illinois Department of Transportation
- ID number: 000050023736203

Characteristics
- Design: Steel girder concrete deck
- Total length: 1,775 feet (541 m)
- Width: 2 traffic lanes, 39 feet (12 m)

History
- Construction end: 1929 (replaced October 29, 2003)
- Opened: 2003

Statistics
- Toll: No

Location
- Interactive map of Shippingsport Bridge

Shippingsport Bridge has been the name of four similarly-located bridges over the Illinois River in LaSalle Township, LaSalle County, Illinois: an early bridge about which not much is known, an 1872 swing span bridge, a 1929 vertical-lift bridge nearby, and a 2003 bridge in the same location as the 1929 bridge. The fourth bridge still exists and carries Illinois Route 351 (IL 351).

== History ==
The Shippingsport Bridge historically carried traffic for U.S. Route 51 (US 51), a major north–south highway between Wisconsin and New Orleans. A bypass was built around Peru and La Salle in 1958. The bypass took the designation of US 51, leaving the Shippingsport Bridge being US 51 Business. Interstate 39 (I-39) was extended south to the Peru and LaSalle area in 1987. I-39 featured the 1.5-mile-long (2.4 km) Abraham Lincoln Memorial Bridge just east of Shippingsport. I-39 ended when it merged into the US 51 bypass south of town. At that time, the old US 51 bypass was turned back to the state of Illinois and was given the designation IL 251. US 51 Business, which used the Shippingsport Bridge, was given the designation IL 351.

== Namesake ==
The bridge is named for the failed settlement of Shippingsport, Illinois, located just west of present-day Oglesby.

== First bridge ==
All that is known of the first bridge is that it was demolished in 1872.

== Second bridge ==
The second bridge to be built in this location was a swing span completed in 1872.

== Third bridge ==
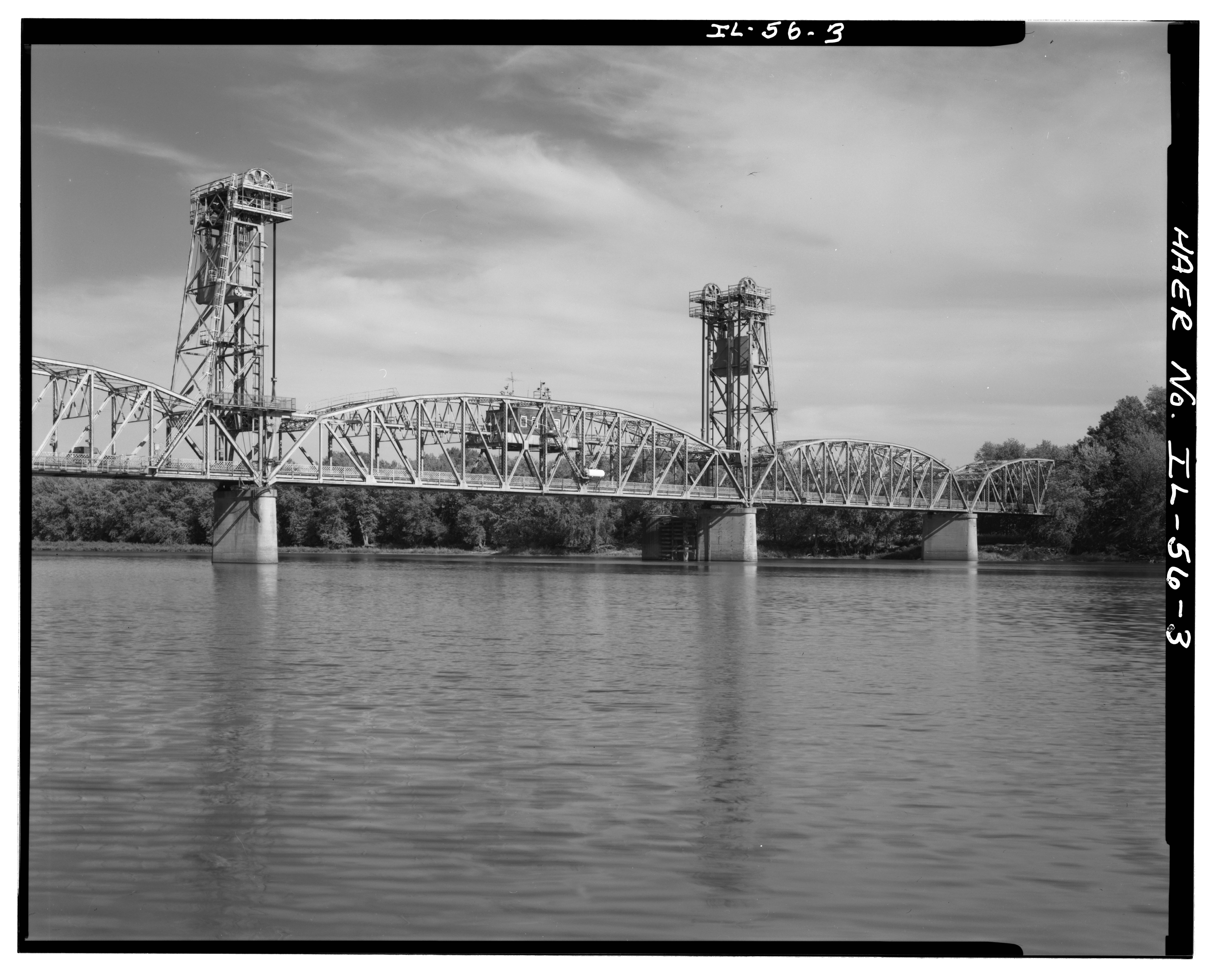
1929 bridge's vertical lift span, viewed from the north side of the Illinois River

The third bridge, opened on November 7, 1929, was a 1,679-foot-long (512 m) multi-span truss bridge with a lift span across the main navigation channel.

It cost $500,000 to build, and opened on November 7, 1929.

The bridge deteriorated to the point where it was no longer safe to commute on. The Illinois Department of Transportation considered simply closing highway 351. The local people organized and convinced IDOT to rebuild the bridge.

== Fourth bridge ==
Due to navigation requirements, the new bridge had to be located in the same spot as the 1929 bridge. The result is that the old bridge was removed before the new bridge could be built. This resulted in the river crossing being closed for 2 years from late 2001 to October 29, 2003. That was 1 year shorter than planned due to the bridge being built much faster than was expected.

The fourth bridge cost $16,000,000 to construct. The new Shippingsport Bridge uses a newly developed high-performance steel. This allowed for thinner girders that could carry across a longer span. This resulted in the need for fewer piers, and gives the bridge a thin, graceful profile. Edward Kreamer & Sons was responsible for the replacement of the bridge.

The bridge came close to being hit by the April 20, 2004 tornado outbreak: An F3 tornado swirled through the Illinois River, knocking over an electrical tower just 20 feet away, although an adjacent tower is still standing. It somehow turned and missed the bridge, heading straight for the nearby community of Utica, Illinois. Nine people were killed when the floor of a tavern collapsed into the basement.

== See also ==
- List of bridges documented by the Historic American Engineering Record in Illinois
