= Money Creek Township =

Money Creek Township may refer to the following townships in the United States:

- Money Creek Township, Houston County, Minnesota
- Money Creek Township, McLean County, Illinois
