= Florence Bridge =

Vertical-lift bridge in Illinois

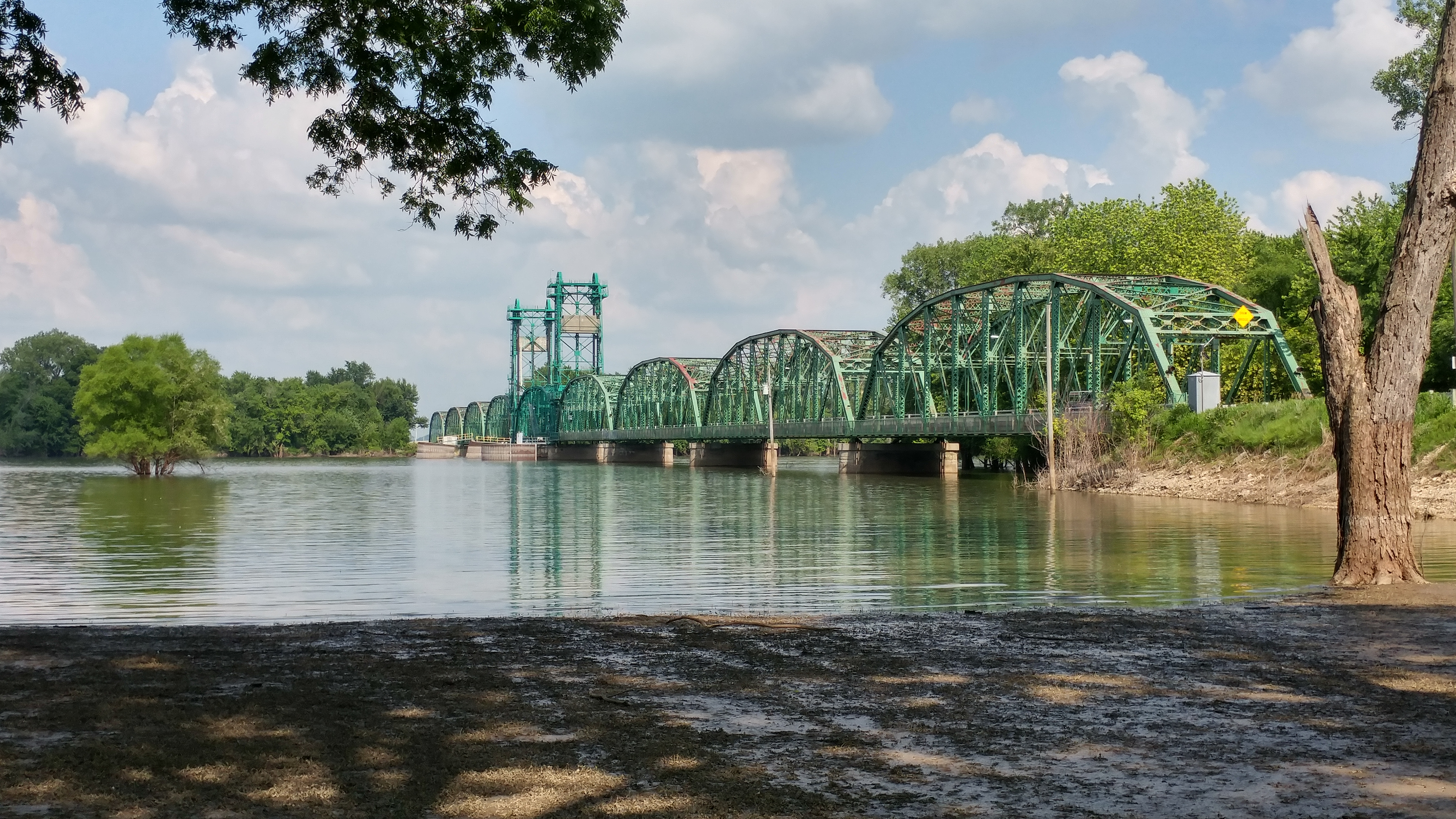
- Coordinates: 39°37′57.30″N 90°36′26.36″W
- Carries: IL 100 / IL 106
- Crosses: Illinois River
- Locale: East of Florence, Illinois

History
- Opened: 1929

Location
- Interactive map of Florence Bridge

The Florence Bridge is a vertical-lift bridge that carries Illinois Route 100 (IL 100) and IL 106 across the Illinois River from Florence to Scott County, Illinois. The bridge is the middle of the three Illinois River crossings on IL 100, with the other two in Hardin (South of Florence) and Beardstown (North of Florence). From its opening in 1929 until 1991, it carried U.S. Route 36 (US 36) and IL 100. In 1991, Interstate 72 (I-72) and the Valley City Eagle Bridges were completed 6 miles (9.7 km) upstream, and US 36 was designated onto I-72, with the old route signed as IL 106 (IL 100 was not rerouted). The bridge was rehabilitated in 1981, and again in 2004. The second time, the bridge was closed due to the need to replace the deck. Traffic was detoured to I-72. In 2012, the bridge's lifting mechanism that allows barge traffic to pass under the bridge had serious problems, and continued use could affect the structural integrity of the span. Therefore, the span was raised and the bridge closed for nine months for repairs, using I-72 as a detour. The bridge reopened on April 22, 2013.

On June 20, 2019, barges pushed by a tugboat struck the bridge in multiple places, causing visible damage. The bridge was closed for emergency repairs, and traffic was detoured over I-72.

== Proposed Replacement ==
A Illinois 100/106, Florence Bridge, River Crossing Study was started in April 2016 by the state of Illinois, and was initially anticipated to take three years to complete. This study represents the Phase I, planning portion of the project, which provides preliminary engineering and environmental impact evaluation to guide the project in future phases of work. Phase I studies were scheduled for completion in fall 2020. The replacement of the Florence Bridge is included in the Illinois Department of Transportation's FY 2021-2026 Highway Improvement Program which includes funding for preliminary & construction engineering, archeology surveys, land acquisition, utility relocations and construction.

The state determined that the bridge, built in 1929, was both "structurally deficient" and "functionally obsolete".

IDOT has hosted three public hearing for the Phase I Study of the Illinois River Bridge at Florence, Illinois along the Scott/Pike County line, with the most recent held on Thursday, September 10, 2020, for the purpose of explaining the alternative alignments for the proposed replacement bridge.

== See also ==
- List of crossings of the Illinois River
