= Logan County Council =

Logan County Council may be:

- Logan County Council (West Virginia)
- Logan County Council (Illinois)
