= Abraham Lincoln Memorial Bridge =

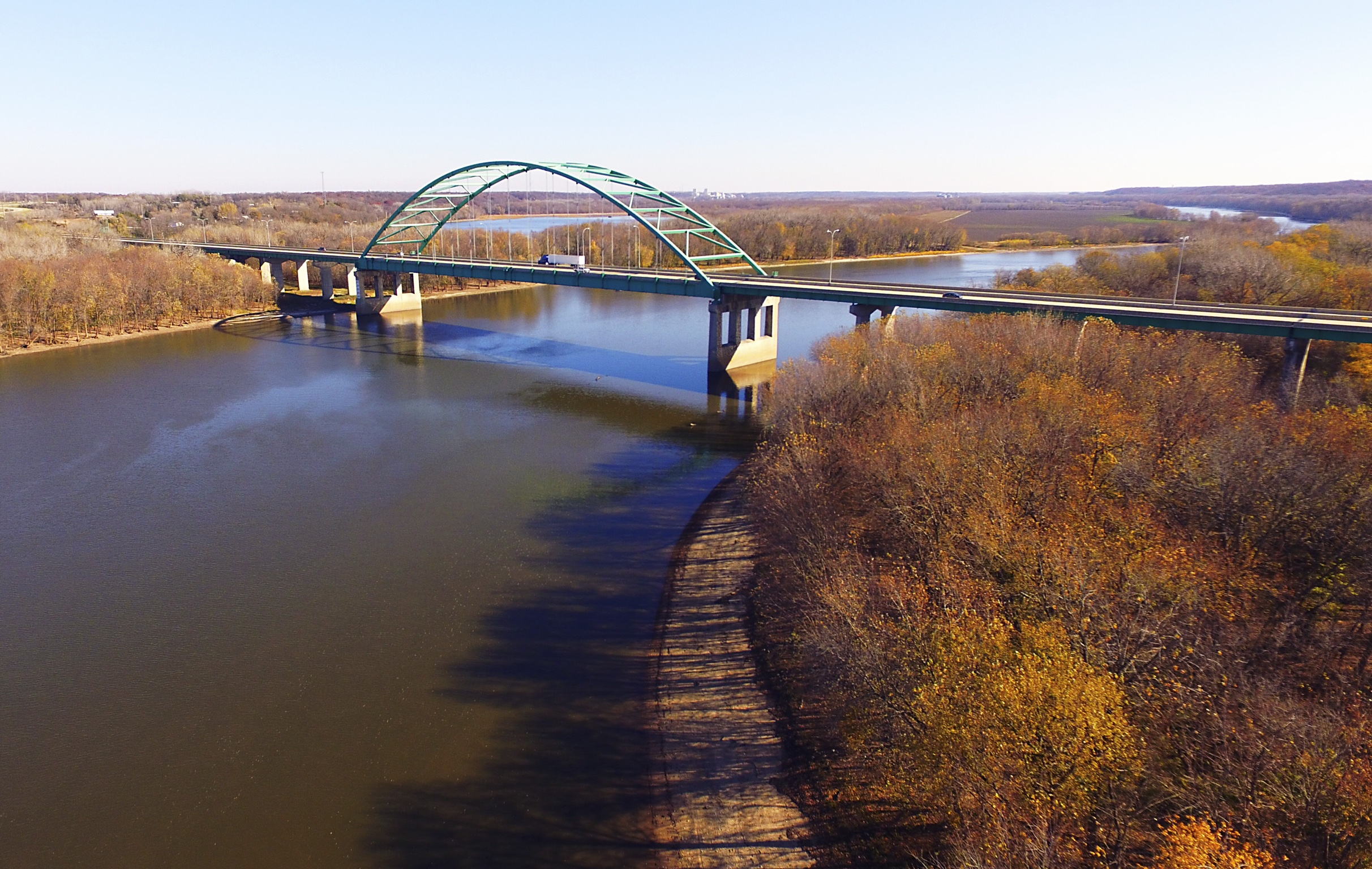
- Abraham Lincoln Memorial Bridge over the Illinois River, near LaSalle, Illinois.
- Coordinates: 41.3247°N 89.0769°W
- Carries: Four lanes of I-39 / US 51
- Crosses: Illinois River, IL 351, Illinois and Michigan Canal, Iowa Interstate Railroad, and Buzzi Unicem industrial rail lead (the former Illinois Central Railroad mainline).
- Locale: LaSalle, Illinois and Oglesby, Illinois
- Official name: Abraham Lincoln Memorial Bridge
- Maintained by: Illinois Department of Transportation
- ID number: 000050019120847

Characteristics
- Design: Through arch
- Total length: 2,170.8 metres (7,122.0 ft)
- Width: 4 traffic lanes, 82 ft (25 m)
- Longest span: 619.9 feet (189 m)
- Clearance above: 19.3 feet (5.88 m)

History
- Opened: 1987

Location
- Interactive map of Abraham Lincoln Memorial Bridge

Abraham Lincoln Memorial Bridge is a four-lane, bidirectional road bridge in Illinois that carries Interstate 39 (I-39) and U.S. Route 51 (US 51) across the Illinois River between LaSalle and Oglesby. The bridge also spans Illinois Route 351, the Illinois and Michigan Canal, local roads, wetlands, and active railroad lines.

Completed in 1987, the bridge is the longest bridge maintained by the Illinois Department of Transportation, with an overall length of approximately 7,122 feet (2,171 m). Its principal feature is a 620-foot (189 m) steel tied-arch span over the Illinois River.

== Description ==
The bridge crosses the Illinois River between LaSalle and Oglesby at river mile 225.8. The structure consists of a 620-foot (189.0 m) steel tied-arch main span over the river and 43 approach spans, giving it an overall length of 7,120.8 feet (2,170.4 m). The main span provides a vertical clearance of 66.0 feet (20.1 m) above the normal pool elevation of the Illinois River. The bridge is named in honor of Abraham Lincoln, the 16th president of the United States. At more than 7,120 feet (2,170 m), it is the longest bridge in Illinois.

== Construction ==
The Abraham Lincoln Memorial Bridge was designed as a steel tied-arch bridge with a 620-foot (189 m) main span across the Illinois River. The structure was engineered by Alfred Benesch & Company and consists of a total of 44 spans, including 43 approach spans carrying Interstate 39 over the Illinois River valley, the Illinois and Michigan Canal, Illinois Route 351, railroads, and local roads. At 7,122 feet (2,171 m) in length, it is the longest bridge maintained by the Illinois Department of Transportation.

== History ==
The Abraham Lincoln Memorial Bridge was completed in 1987 as part of the initial southward extension of Interstate 39 across the Illinois River. When the bridge opened, I-39 terminated at what is now Illinois Route 251 south of the river. The interstate was subsequently extended south in stages, reaching the Bloomington–Normal area upon completion of the final segment in 1992.

== Rehabilitation ==
Beginning in 2007, the Illinois Department of Transportation undertook a major rehabilitation of the bridge after the original precast concrete deck panels experienced premature deterioration. The project included replacement of the bridge deck, repairs to the substructure, replacement of expansion rocker bearings, and improvements to the bridge drainage system. Construction was completed on October 31, 2008, 15 days ahead of schedule, minimizing disruptions to traffic on Interstate 39. The rehabilitation project received national recognition through the America's Transportation Awards program.

== See also ==
- List of crossings of the Illinois River
- Interstate 39
- Illinois Route 351
