= Wokanda =

Wokanda may refer to:

- Camp Wokanda, a former boy scouts camp in Illinois, United States
- A misspelling of Wakanda, a fictional country in the Marvel Comics universe
