= Evergreen Lake (Illinois) =

- Location within Illinois Location within the United States
- Location: McLean County, Illinois and Woodford County, Illinois
- Coordinates: 40°38′02″N 89°02′17″W
- Type: reservoir
- Primary inflows: Six Mile Creek
- Primary outflows: Mackinaw River
- Basin countries: United States
- Max. length: 4 mi (6.4 km)
- Max. width: 0.4 mi (0.64 km)
- Surface area: 925 acres (374 ha)

Evergreen Lake is a 925-acre (374 ha) reservoir located in McLean County, Illinois and Woodford County, Illinois. Created by damming Six Mile Creek, it was built for recreation, sport fishing, and water supply purposes. The lake is 4 miles (6.4 km) long and 0.4 miles (0.64 km) wide. The nearest town is Kappa, Illinois, north of Normal, Illinois.

Evergreen Lake is managed for crappie fishing. There is a 10-h.p. power limit on the lake.
