= Illinois Route 351 =

State highway in LaSalle County, Illinois, US

Illinois Route 351
- IL 351 highlighted in red

Route information
- Maintained by IDOT
- Length: 8.55 mi (13.76 km)
- Existed: 1966–present

Major junctions
- South end: IL 71 / IL 251 in Oglesby
- US 6 in LaSalle
- North end: I-80 in LaSalle

Location
- Country: United States
- State: Illinois
- Counties: LaSalle

Highway system
- Illinois State Highway System; Interstate; US; State; Tollways; Scenic
← IL 336	→ I-355

Illinois Route 351 is a north–south state route that leads from Illinois Route 71 and Illinois Route 251 by Oglesby through downtown LaSalle to Interstate 80. It is 8.55 miles (13.76 km) long.

== Route description ==
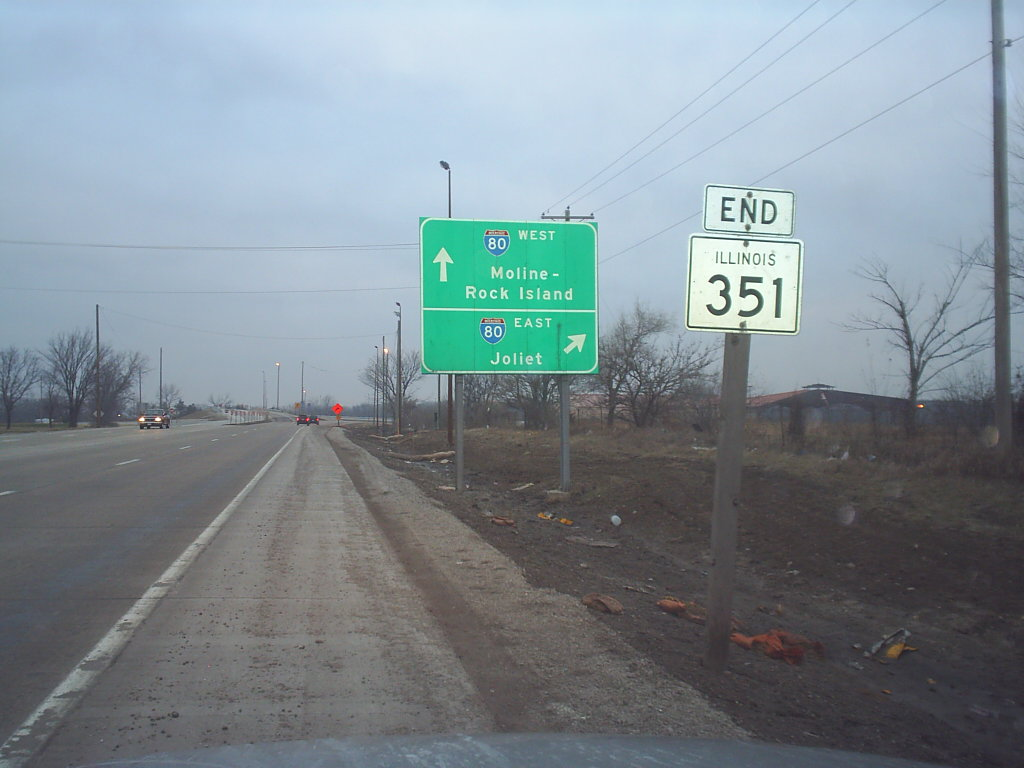
Northern terminus of IL 351

Illinois 351 is the former Business U.S. Route 51 through La Salle. It crosses over the Illinois River on the Shippingsport Bridge south of La Salle and passes underneath the Abraham Lincoln Memorial Bridge as it climbs out of the Illinois River Valley. Like Illinois Route 251, Illinois 351 can be considered a spur off its parent, U.S. Route 51.

== History ==
Prior to 1963, US 51 originally traveled mostly along present-day IL 351. From 1963 to 1966, it became US 51 Business (US 51 Bus.) as US 51 was rerouted west of LaSalle along present-day Illinois Route 251. After 1966, it was then changed to IL 351.

== Major intersections ==
The entire route is in LaSalle County.

Location	mi	km	Destinations	Notes
	0.00	0.00	IL 71 west / IL 251	Southern end of IL 71 overlap
Oglesby	3.31	5.33	IL 71 east	Northern end of IL 71 overlap
LaSalle	5.62	9.04	US 6 west (3rd Street)	Southern end of US 6 overlap
LaSalle	5.78	9.30	US 6 east (5th Street)	Northern end of US 6 overlap
LaSalle	8.55	13.76	I-80 – Moline, Rock Island, Chicago	
1.000 mi = 1.609 km; 1.000 km = 0.621 mi: Concurrency terminus
