= Veterans Memorial Bridge (Ottawa, Illinois) =

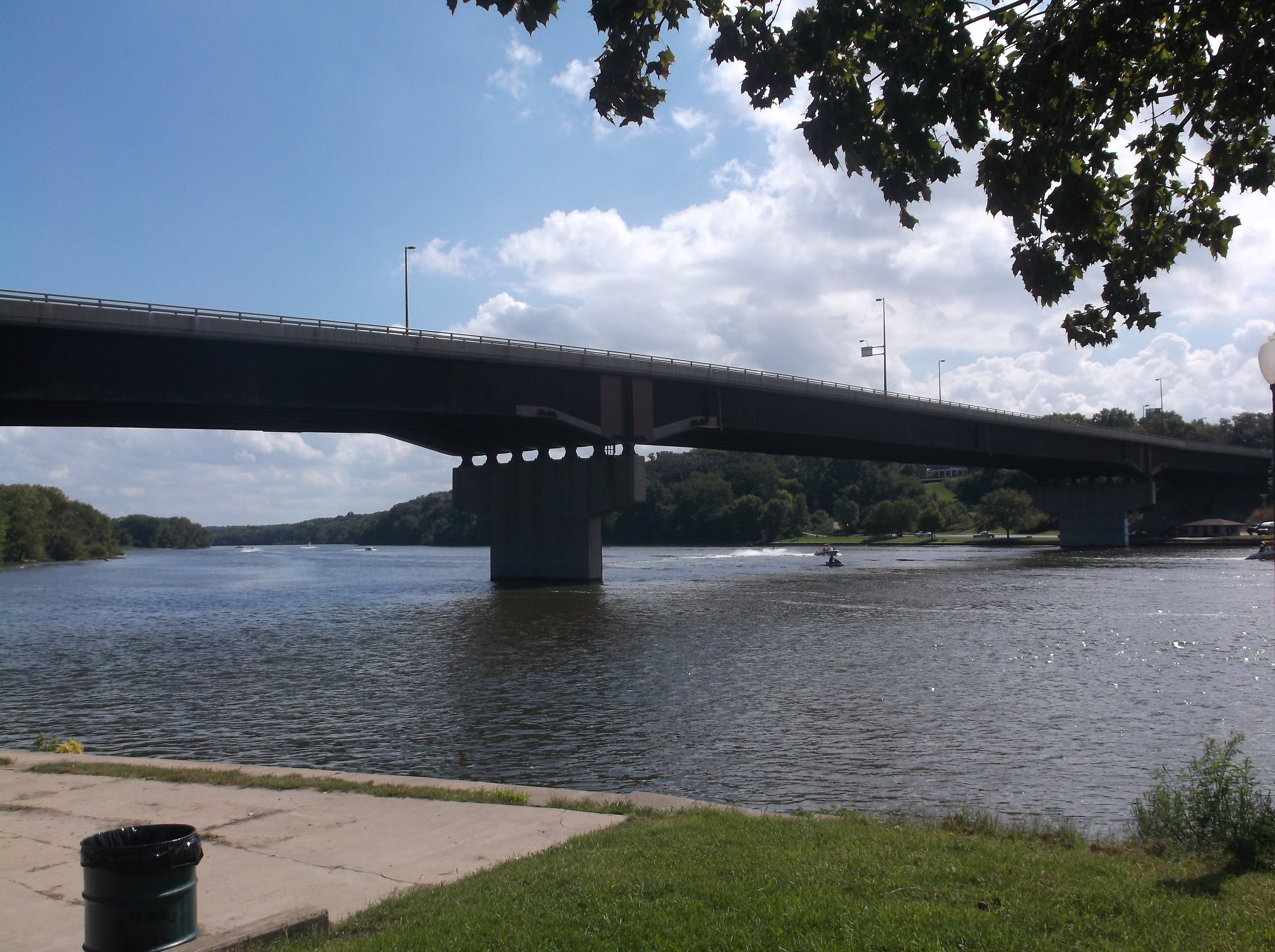
- Veterans Memorial Bridge in Ottawa, Illinois
- Coordinates: 41.3422°N 88.84087°W
- Crosses: Illinois River
- Locale: Ottawa, Illinois
- Official name: Veterans Memorial Bridge
- Maintained by: Illinois Department of Transportation
- ID number: 000050018006053

Characteristics
- Design: Concrete deck
- Total length: 1,317 feet
- Width: 4 lanes, 57 feet
- Height: 47 feet above water (496 feet above sea level)

History
- Opened: 1981

The Veterans Memorial Bridge, also known locally as the "Illinois River Bridge", and the "Rte 23 Bridge", is a four-lane concrete-deck road bridge that crosses the Illinois River in Ottawa, Illinois.

The bridge is the main and only road route within the city connecting Ottawa's south side to the center of the city, and is a part of Illinois Routes 23 and 71. This was built in 1932-1933. The bridge connects to State Street on the south end, and to Columbus Street and La Salle Street on the north end, one-way streets in Ottawa's city center.

The bridge sits about 1,800 feet (550 m) to the east and upriver from the vertical-lift railroad bridge in Ottawa, and sits at the mouth of the Fox River as it enters the Illinois River.

The bridge was opened in 1981, replacing the old truss bridge that once crossed the river about 300 feet (91 m) to the west. The key feature of the bridge is that it has a very high and long main span. The high and wide main span is much safer for the navigation of river traffic than the older bridge, which had a narrower central span. The current bridge is typically modern. The bridge connects high to the bluff at the south end, is level for two spans, then connects low to the valley floor in the city center. The lengths of the bridge spans are 305 feet (93 m), 510 feet (160 m), and 385 feet (117 m).

== See also ==
- List of crossings of the Illinois River
