= Kappa, Illinois =

Kappa
- Village
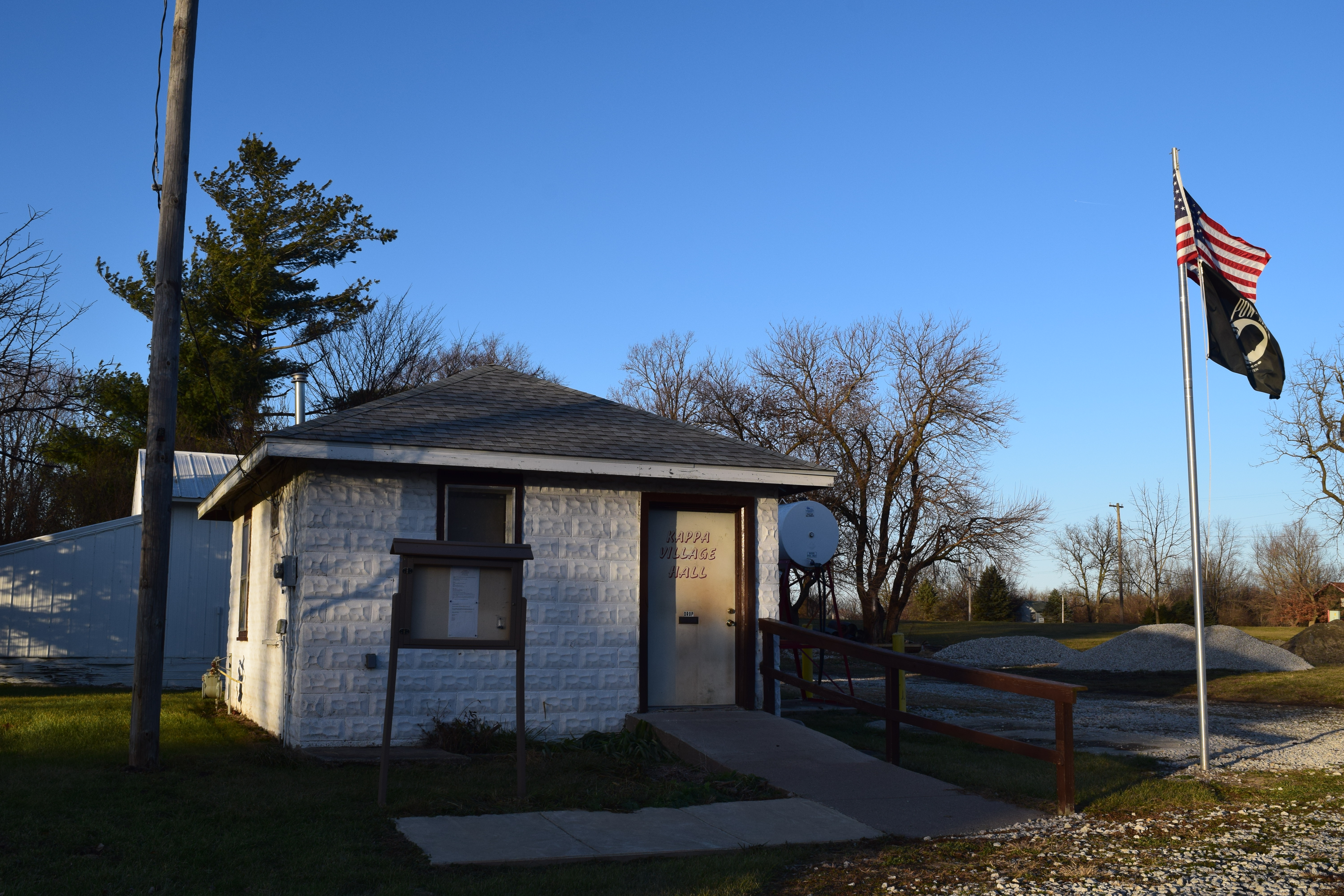
- Kappa village hall

- Location of Kappa in Woodford County, Illinois.
- Coordinates: 40°40′32″N 89°00′11″W
- Country: United States
- State: Illinois
- County: Woodford
- Named for: Quapaw

Area
  - Total: 0.36 sq mi (0.93 km^{2})
  - Land: 0.36 sq mi (0.93 km^{2})
  - Water: 0 sq mi (0.00 km^{2})
- Elevation: 725 ft (221 m)

Population (2020)
  - Total: 229
  - Density: 641.2/sq mi (247.55/km^{2})
- Time zone: UTC-6 (CST)
  - Summer (DST): UTC-5 (CDT)
- ZIP code: 61738
- Area code: 309
- FIPS code: 17-39038
- GNIS feature ID: 2398328

Kappa is a village in Woodford County, Illinois, United States. As of the 2020 census, Kappa had a population of 229. It is part of the Peoria, Illinois Metropolitan Statistical Area.

Kappa sits on the north side of the Mackinaw River. Approximately five miles to the southeast is Lake Bloomington, while five miles to the southwest is Evergreen Lake.

== History ==
In 1833, Thomas Dixon became the first settler in the area that would later become Kappa. Over the next few years, additional settlers arrived, and the Illinois Central Railroad built a line through the community. Rail service and a post office commenced in the early 1850s. The first postmaster, William Jones, proposed the name Montrose, but the Illinois Central Railroad favored Kappa. The name Roxan was used between May 1852 and December 1853 before Kappa was officially adopted.

A folk etymology claims Kappa is named for the tenth letter of the Greek alphabet, as it was supposedly the tenth town between Dunleith (now East Dubuque) and Bloomington. The true origin, however, is a corruption of Quapaw, a Native American people of the region.

The railroad line from East Dubuque to Bloomington was later decommissioned. In the early 20th century, State Bond Issue Route 2 was established and later redesignated U.S. Route 51. U.S. 51 now bypasses the town to the west, leaving Illinois Route 251 as the main north‑south road through Kappa.

== Geography ==
According to the 2010 census, Kappa has a total area of 0.34 square miles (0.88 km^{2}), all land.

== Demographics ==
Historical population
Census	Pop.	Note	%±
1900	175		—
1910	142		−18.9%
1920	149		4.9%
1930	123		−17.4%
1940	141		14.6%
1950	125		−11.3%
1960	119		−4.8%
1970	131		10.1%
1980	170		29.8%
1990	134		−21.2%
2000	170		26.9%
2010	227		33.5%
2020	229		0.9%
U.S. Decennial Census

As of the census of 2000, there were 170 people, 63 households, and 48 families residing in the village. The population density was 747.1 inhabitants per square mile (288.5/km^{2}). There were 67 housing units at an average density of 294.5 units per square mile (113.7 units/km^{2}). The racial makeup of the village was 97.06% White, 1.18% Native American, 1.76% from other races. Hispanic or Latino of any race were 2.35% of the population.

There were 63 households, out of which 47.6% had children under the age of 18 living with them, 58.7% were married couples living together, 9.5% had a female householder with no husband present, and 23.8% were non-families. 20.6% of all households were made up of individuals, and 6.3% had someone living alone who was 65 years of age or older. The average household size was 2.70 and the average family size was 3.08.

In the village, the population was spread out, with 32.4% under the age of 18, 5.9% from 18 to 24, 34.1% from 25 to 44, 19.4% from 45 to 64, and 8.2% who were 65 years of age or older. The median age was 32 years. For every 100 females, there were 97.7 males. For every 100 females age 18 and over, there were 94.9 males.

The median income for a household in the village was $46,786, and the median income for a family was $50,417. Males had a median income of $35,417 versus $21,250 for females. The per capita income for the village was $17,451. About 6.0% of families and 9.6% of the population were below the poverty line, including 14.6% of those under the age of eighteen and 12.5% of those 65 or over.

== Education ==
It is in the El Paso-Gridley Community Unit School District 11.

== Attractions ==
=== Recreation and entertainment ===
The small village's main attraction is the Kappa Gentlemen's Club, a strip club that has been the subject of multiple legal cases, including a prostitution bust as part of an undercover sting operation in 2008.
