= Fay E. Davis =

American painter

- Born: Fay Elizabeth Davis; July 8, 1916; Indianapolis, Indiana
- Died: November 30, 1997 (aged 81); Bradenton, Florida
- Other names: Fay Davis Prout, Fay D. Prout
- Occupation: artist
- Years active: 1932–1945

Fay Elizabeth Davis (July 8, 1916 – November 30, 1997) was an American artist, graphic designer and muralist who created three post office murals as part of the art projects for the New Deal's Section of Painting and Sculpture.

== Early life ==
Fay Elizabeth Davis was born on July 8, 1916, in Indianapolis, Indiana, to Georgia (née Amick) and Julian Davis. She attended the John Herron Art Institute, graduating in 1938. That same year, she won the prize for the best entry in the Indiana Art Exhibit.

== Career ==
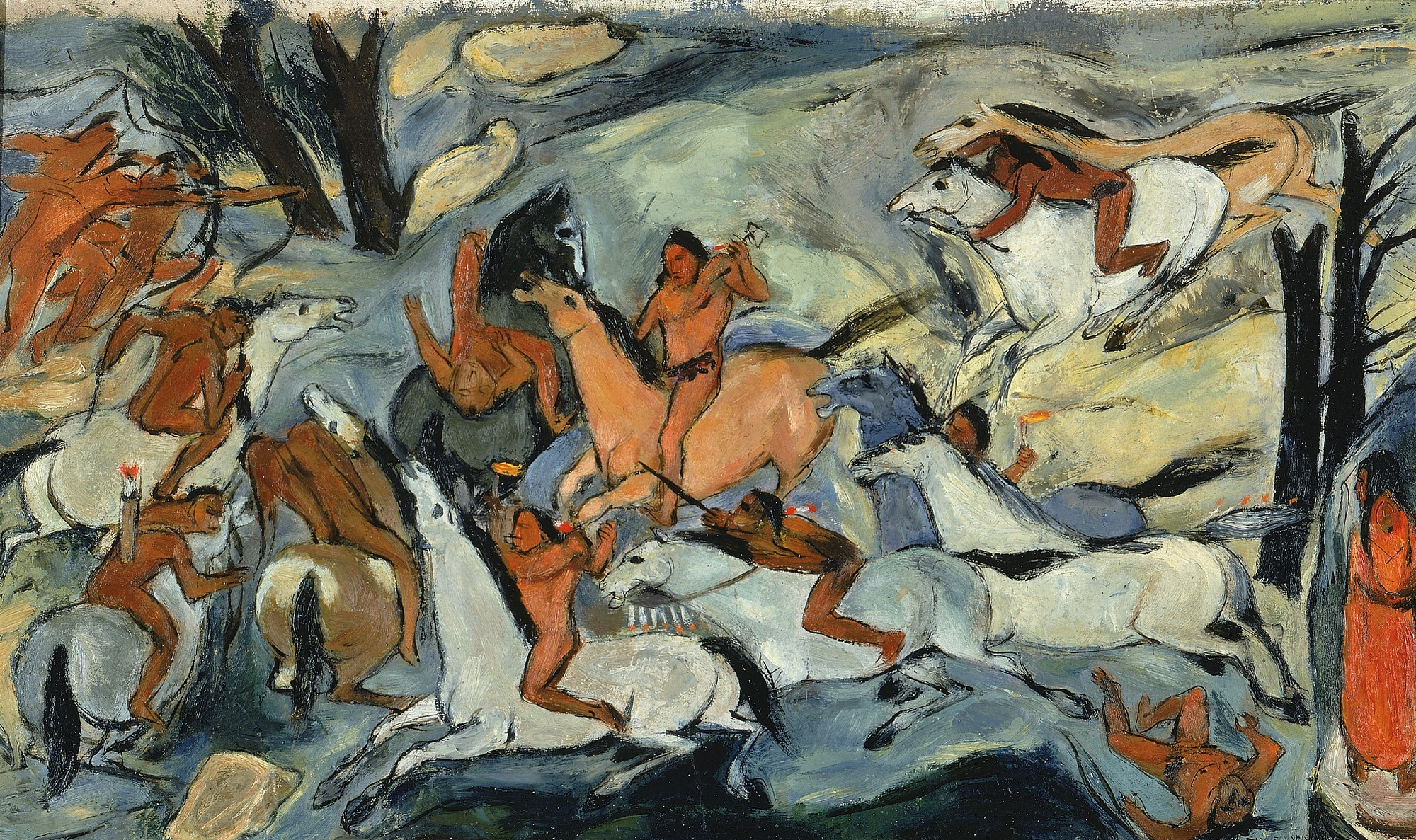
The Illini and Potawatomies Struggle at Starved Rock, mural study, for the U.S. Post Office at Oglesby, Illinois, by Fay E. Davis, ca. 1941

Davis was among the artists working for the Works Project Administration (WPA) to create murals depicting regional scenes. Encouraged to visit the towns where they worked, these artists incorporated local themes into their paintings, which were typically completed off-site and then installed in public buildings. She secured a commission to paint the post office mural for Ligonier, Indiana, which was installed in 1940. Titled Cutting Timber, the mural depicts lumberjacks felling trees and hauling them away by oxcart.

Davis also received two commissions in Illinois; Loading the Packet for the Chester post office and The Illini and Potawatomies Struggle at Starved Rock at Oglesby. Loading the Packet was completed in 1940 and portrays the daily lives of citizens during the peak of riverboat travel depicting children playing, families conversing and dockworkers loading boats. It became a cherished symbol by the community's heritage, with the postmaster expressing ea preference to save the mural over the mall in case of fire.

Her second Illinois mural, The Illini and Potawatomies Struggle at Starved Rock, was installed in the Oglesby post office in 1942. Davis won the commission to paint the mural the previous year and made several trips to Starved Rock State Park to prepare the painting, which features 14 Native Americans in battle. Some of the fighters are on horseback and others are on foot. Painted in muted earth tones, the painting faded badly and was restored in 1988. In 1993, the mural came back into the news when a janitor at the post office claimed the nudity of the figures rendered the scene pornographic and filed a union grievance; while his complaint was being reviewed, the painting was shielded from the public by blinds. After a petition drive by local citizens to remove the blinds, the mural was uncovered and back on public display. Post office employees reported that the controversy had elevated the number of people who came to see the painting.

On December 18, 1943, Davis married fellow artist and Herron alumnus, George M. Prout in Columbus, Indiana. She worked at Staley Manufacturing Company as a drafter, while continuing to work in a studio she and her husband shared in Columbus. The year following her marriage, Davis-Prout won first prize in the 37th Annual Indiana Artists Exhibition, the oldest art competition in the state, with her entry Coal for Chicago. In 1947, she went to work at Arvin Industries in the Columbus plant, remaining there for at least five years. In 1959, the couple relocated to Sarasota, Florida, and then moved to Bradenton in 1972.

== Death and legacy ==
Davis-Prout died on November 30, 1997, in Bradenton, Manatee County, Florida.
