= Money Creek, Minnesota =

Unincorporated community in Minnesota, United States

Money Creek
- Unincorporated community
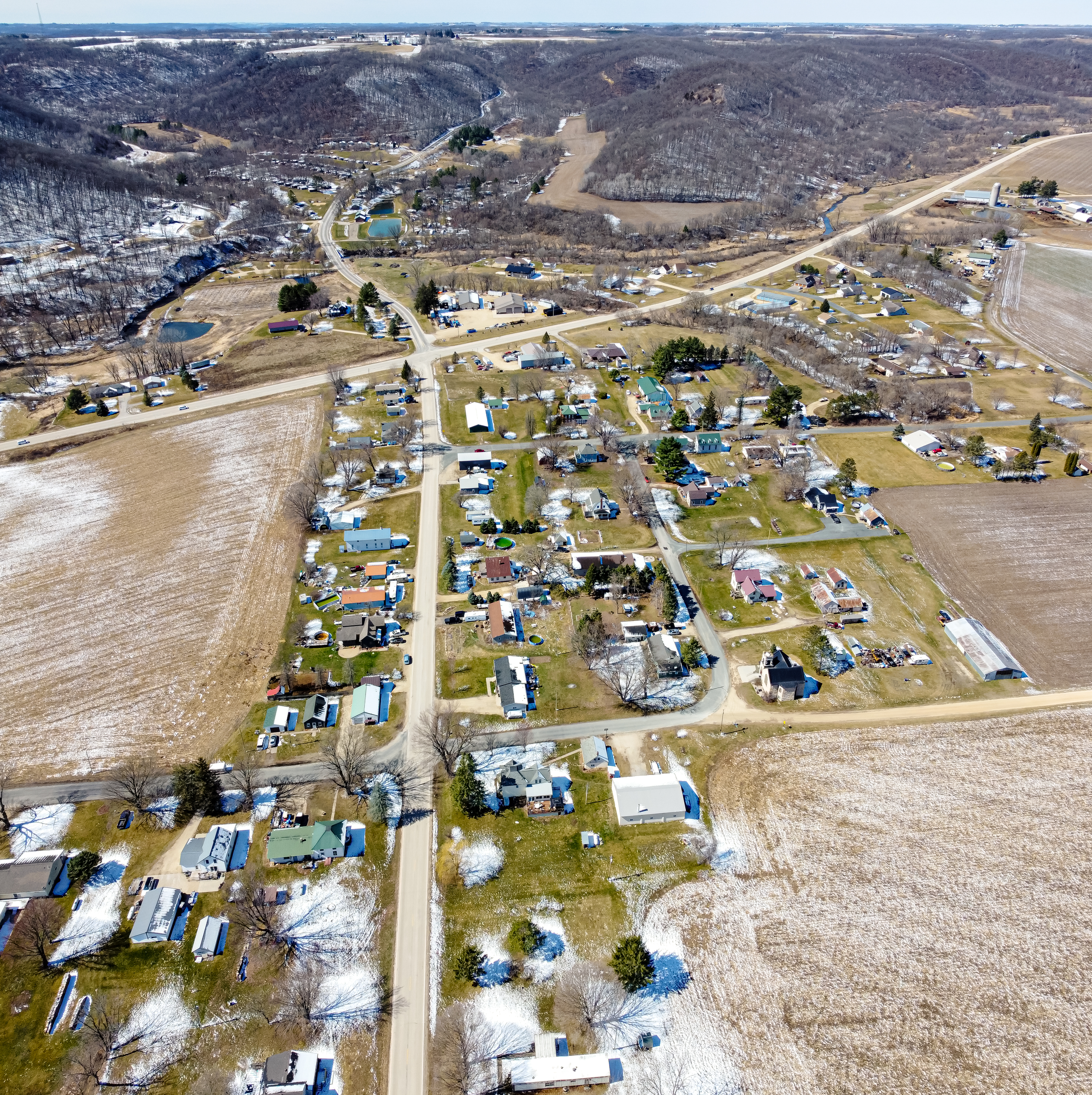
- MN-76 and Money Creek run through town

- Location within Minnesota Location within the United States
- Coordinates: 43°49′17″N 91°36′49″W
- Country: United States
- State: Minnesota
- County: Houston
- Elevation: 768 ft (234 m)
- Time zone: UTC-6 (Central (CST))
  - Summer (DST): UTC-5 (CDT)
- Area code: 507
- GNIS feature ID: 648024

Money Creek is an unincorporated community in Houston County, Minnesota, United States.

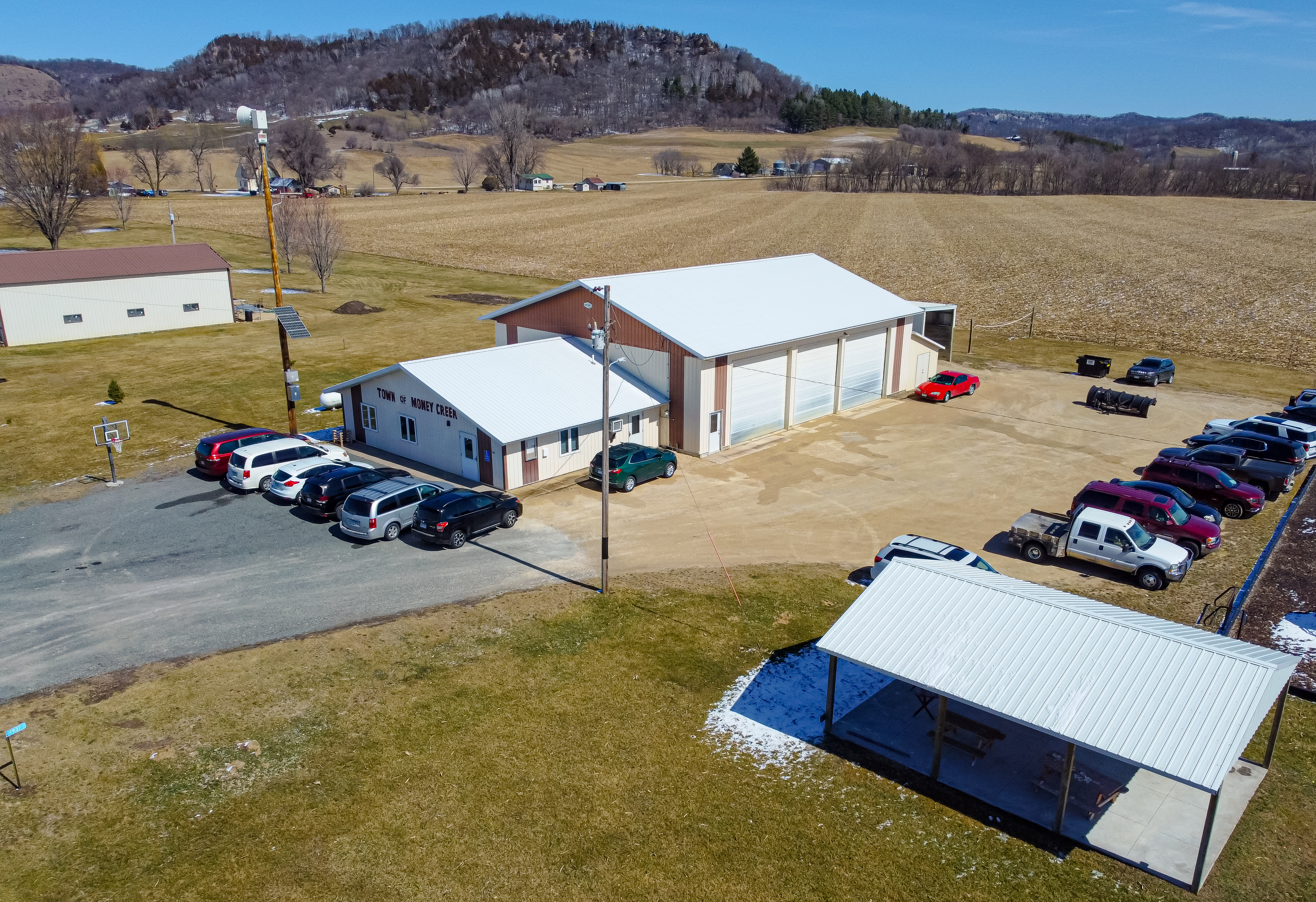
Money Creek town hall

== History ==
Money Creek was platted in 1856 by the name of Clinton. The community took its name from nearby Money Creek. A post office was established at Money Creek in 1856, and remained in operation until 1907.

Historical population
Census	Pop.	Note	%±
1880	46		—
U.S. Decennial Census
