= Money Creek (Illinois) =

- Location within Illinois

Location
- Country: United States
- State: Illinois
- County: McLean

Physical characteristics
- Source
  - location: Near Ellsworth, Illinois
  - coordinates: 40°28′17″N 88°41′18″W
- Mouth: Mackinaw River
  - location: East of Kappa, Illinois
  - coordinates: 40°39′52″N 88°58′03″W
  - elevation: 669 feet (204 m)

Basin features
- Waterbodies: Lake Bloomington
- GNIS ID: 413722

Money Creek is a stream in McLean County, Illinois, in the United States, a tributary of the Mackinaw River. The reservoir Lake Bloomington was created by impounding its water.

The origin of the name Money Creek is obscure. One tradition states a pioneer settler buried money there and died before it could be retrieved; another tradition states money was discovered there by Indians.

== See also ==
- List of rivers of Illinois
