= Money Run (West Virginia) =

Stream in West Virginia, U.S.

Coordinates: 39°34′55″N 80°44′56″W

Money Run is a stream in the U.S. state of West Virginia.

Money Run was named after Money Bates, a pioneer settler.

== See also ==
- List of rivers of West Virginia
