= Money Creek (Washington) =

Stream in Washington, U.S.

Coordinates: 47°43′43″N 121°25′29″W

Money Creek is a stream in the U.S. state of Washington.

Money Creek was named for the fact money was invested in mines near the stream's course.

== See also ==
- List of rivers of Washington (state)
