= Beardstown Bridge =

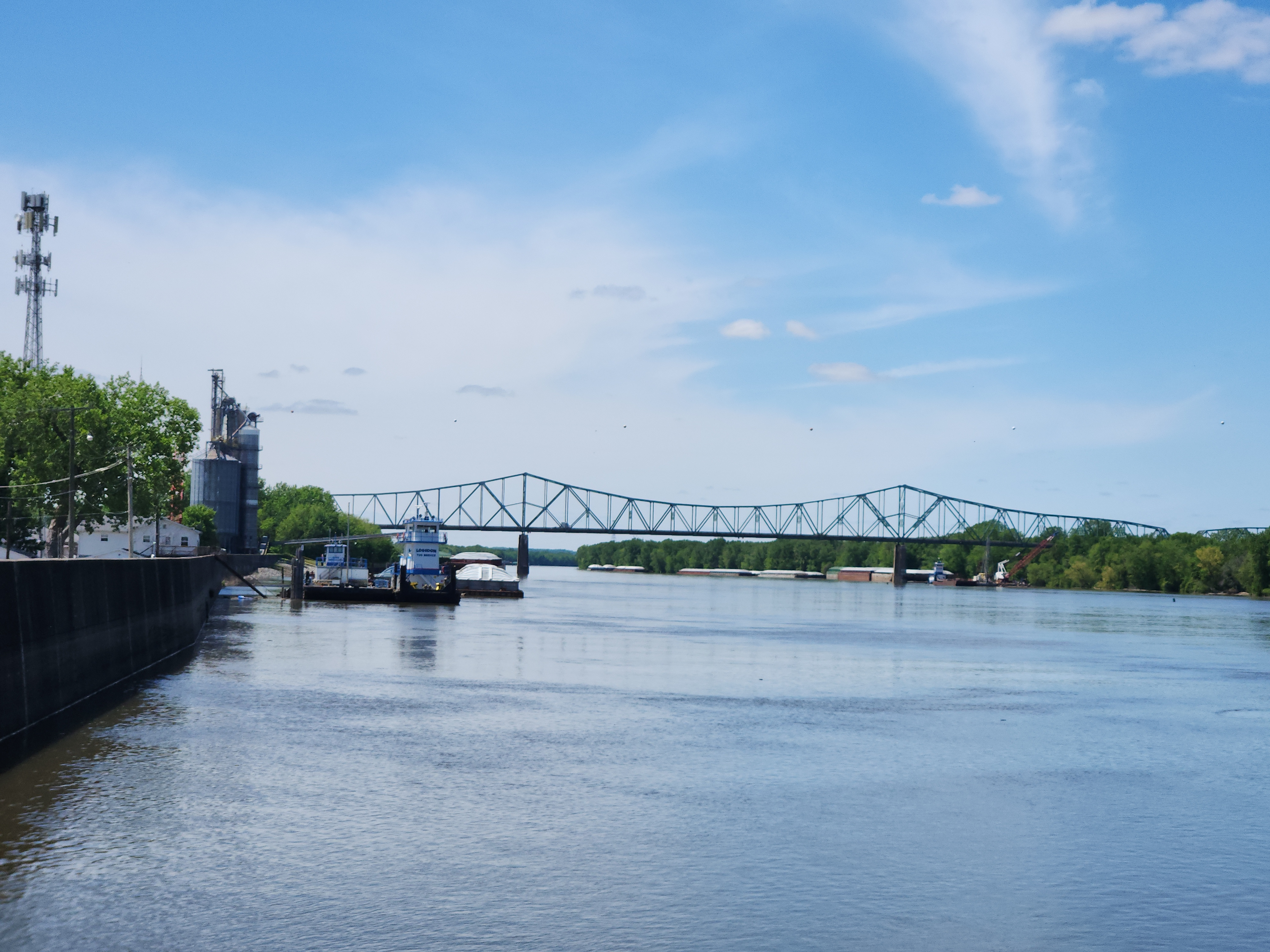
- Coordinates: 40.017°N 90.4481°W
- Carries: US 67 / IL 100
- Crosses: Illinois River
- Locale: Beardstown, Illinois
- Maintained by: Illinois DOT
- ID number: 000009000101961

Characteristics
- Design: Cantilevered Warren through truss
- Total length: 3,624.2 feet (0.68640 mi; 1.1047 km)
- No. of spans: 5
- Clearance above: 17.4 feet (5.3 m)
- Clearance below: 49.9 feet (15.2 m)

History
- Opened: 1955

Statistics
- Daily traffic: 6,300 (as of 2011)

The Beardstown Bridge (William H Deitritch Bridge) is a two-lane bridge that carries U.S. Route 67 (US 67) and Illinois Route 100 (IL 100) across the Illinois River between Schuyler County, Illinois and the city of Beardstown, Cass County, Illinois. The bridge was built in 1955 and rehabilitated in 1985. It is the northernmost and furthest upstream of the three Illinois River crossings used by IL 100, with the other two being at Florence and Hardin.

The bridge is appraised as structurally deficient, with a sufficiency rating of 40.2 out of 100 during its 2000 and 2010 inspections. The IDOT estimates that it would cost $173 million to construct a replacement bridge and approach roads. A new bridge is part of the plans for a U.S. 67 Corridor project.
