= Seneca Rail Bridge =

- Coordinates: 41°18′21.4″N 88°35′7.8″W
- Crosses: Illinois River
- Locale: Seneca, Illinois
- Official name: Seneca Rail Bridge
- Maintained by: Illinois Department of Transportation
- ID number: N/A

Characteristics
- Design: Steel truss
- Height: 22 feet (about 6.8 meters)

Location
- Interactive map of Seneca Rail Bridge

The Seneca Rail Bridge is a rail bridge in Seneca, Illinois, United States over the Illinois River. It was built by the Chicago, Rock Island & Pacific Railroad. The first bridge in this location was built around 1853; the present bridge around 1930.
