= W. D. Boyce Council =

Council of Scouting America

W.D. Boyce Council (#138)
- Owner: Scouting America
- Headquarters: Peoria, IL
- Country: United States
- Scout Executive/CEO: Ben Blumenberg
- Website http://www.wdboyce.org

The W. D. Boyce Council of Scouting America serves youth in central Illinois, from Lincoln to Ottawa, and Peoria to Bloomington.

== Organization ==
The council is divided into districts:

- Crossroads District - Serving youth in DeWitt, Livingston, Logan, McLean, and part of Ford county.
- Heartland District - Serving youth in Fulton, Marshall, and Peoria counties.
- Lowaneu District - Serving youth in Bureau, Putnam, and LaSalle counties.
- Wotamalo District - Serving youth in Woodford, Tazewell, Mason, and part of Logan county.

== History ==
Formerly the Starved Rock Area Council, Corn Belt Council and the Creve Coeur Council, W.D. Boyce Council was created by merger and renamed in 1973 in honor of the founder of the BSA, whose grave and monument lie overlooking the Illinois River not far from the Ottawa Scouting Museum in Ottawa, Illinois. The council headquarters is in Peoria, Illinois. The council runs Ingersoll Scout Reservation west of Peoria and Cache Lake Scout Camp in Ontario, Canada. W.D. Boyce Council is served by Wenasa Quenhotan Lodge #23.

Camp Ki-Shau-Wau is a former Boy Scout camp owned by the Starved Rock Area Council (and later by the W.D. Boyce Council after the merger in 1972) located two miles southeast of Lowell, Illinois along the Vermillion river. Its first name was Camp Pontiac. Shortly after, it was renamed after the three Scouting districts known as Kinebo, Shabbona and Waubuncie (Ki-Shau-Wau). The last official summer camp program was held in 1976. The camp opened in 1926 and was sold in 1989. The site is a private retreat, http://www.kishauwaucabins.com/, today where cabins can be rented. In the movie "Fracture", Ryan Gosling's character can be seen wearing a Camp Ki-Shau-Wau T-shirt in one scene.

Camp Heffernan is a former Boy Scout camp owned by the Corn Belt Council. It is located north of Normal, Illinois on Lake Bloomington. It is now owned by Easter Seals of Central Illinois and has been renamed Timber Pointe Outdoor Center.

Camp Wokanda is a former Boy Scout camp located just north of the city of Peoria, Illinois. The grounds are set on the edge of the Illinois River Valley and are bordered by Mossville Road, Mossville proper (and the natural gas pipeline) Colony Point and Deerbrook Subdivisions, and Cedar Hills Road.

The Boy Scouts sold the property to the Peoria Park District in the 1990s and built a new camp farther north of the city. The Park District rents out the main meeting house for parties and created a few new trails that cross from the Camp over to Robinson Park, which abuts the campgrounds.

Camp Woodland is a former Boy Scout camp near Washburn, Illinois. The land for the camp was purchased in the early 90s with intentions to grow into a 2nd summer camp and special use facility. Caterpillar Inc. donated a large amount of money for a large dining hall to be constructed. Several other companies and private individuals donated large amounts for the construction of the pool and various other buildings in the main camp area. Several campsites were developed for use along a main trail that ran to the south of the buildings. Approximately 15% of the land was developed for use prior to the council developing severe financial issues. After much heated debate, the camp was sold in 1998 to the Salvation Army which renamed it Eagle Crest Camp. They added many more buildings and continued development of the facility to serve their mission.

== Camps ==
=== Ingersoll Scout Reservation ===
Ingersoll Scout Reservation
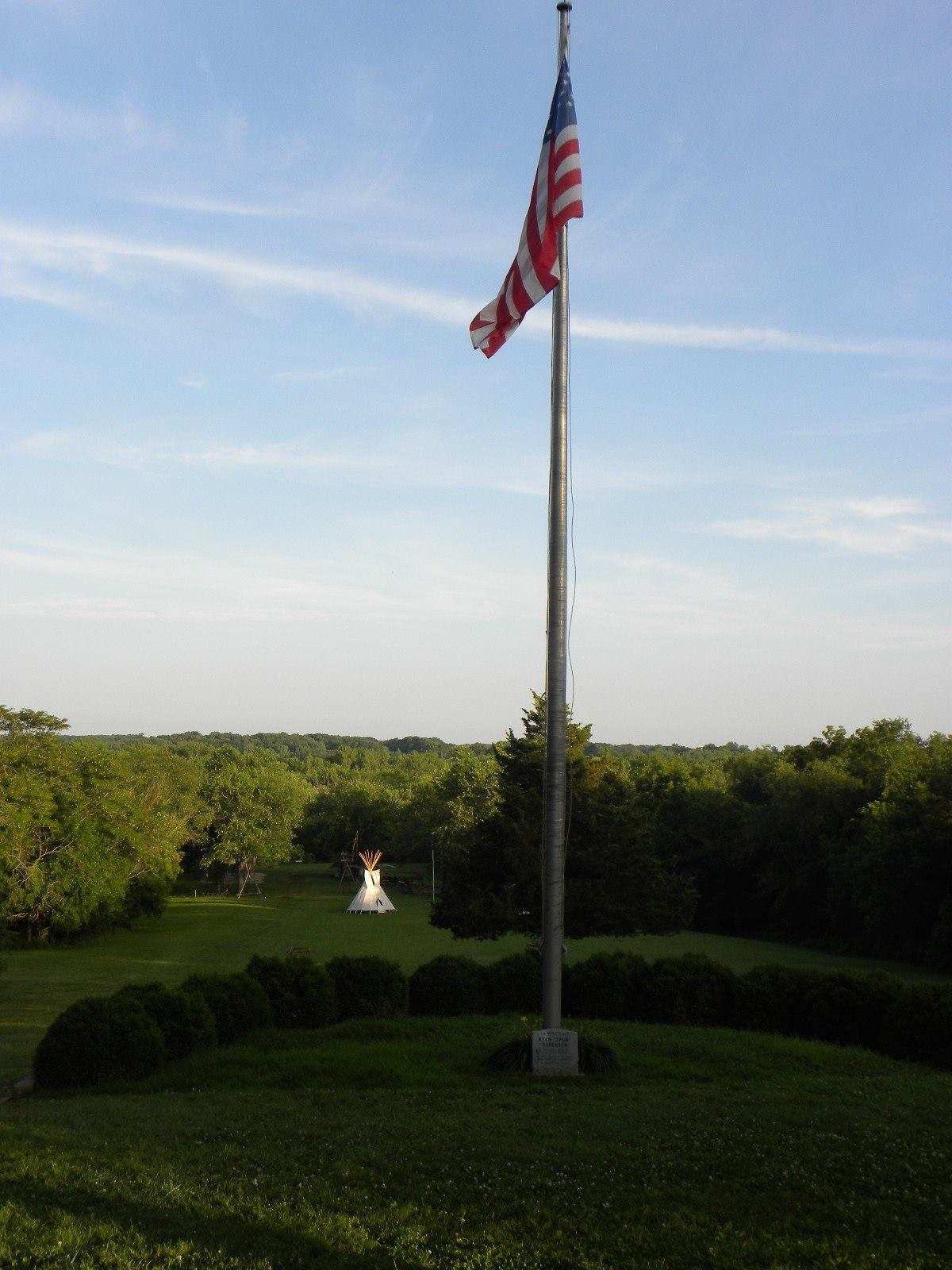
- Location: London Mills, IL
- Coordinates: 40.7176°N 90.3201°W
- Founded: 1963

Ingersoll Scout Reservation (ISR, or simply Ingersoll) is the primary resident camp of the W.D. Boyce Council of the Boy Scouts of America. Initially founded as Wilderness Camp in 1963, the camp was renamed in 1973 to posthumously honor William P. Ingersoll, a local philanthropist who helped in the camp's initial purchase.

==== Geography ====
Ingersoll straddles Fulton and Knox Counties, near London Mills, IL. It is primarily accessed by Illinois Route 116.

The numerous small creeks and gullies emptying into Cedar Creek on the southern edge of Ingersoll gives the camp unusually varied topography for the area. This is most visible at "Dining Hall Hill," the main thoroughfare of the camp, which is located on a long incline overlooking the broad Cedar Creek Valley. One minor tributary of the Cedar Creek was dammed in 1963, forming 17-acre Lake Roberts.

The reservation is home to many native Illinois wildlife species, including white-tailed deer, raccoons, wild turkey, foxes, and coyotes. Beavers have also been known to make their homes on the Cedar Creek, though they are rarely sighted. The entire camp is designated as a wildlife preservation area by the state of Illinois. In less-developed regions of the camp, native prairie grasses have been allowed to grow, creating a habitat for many native plants.

==== Facilities & Programs ====
The dining hall is the center of resident camp activities. It includes indoor and outdoor seating, a kitchen, and an adjacent commissary building. The flagpole in front of the dining hall is the site of daily flag ceremonies. During the winter months, the dining hall is used for cold-weather camping.

The Wilderness Training Center, or WTC, is a climate-controlled facility that can be used for training or cold weather camping. The Health Lodge and Camp Office are also housed in this building. This complex was originally donated by Caterpillar Inc. in the 1970s and previously served as the camp commissary and trading post, hence its nickname, the "Old Commissary".

The RMS Lodge houses 44 staff members during the summer and acts as the premier conference center during the off-season. It is climate-controlled, and it includes heated floors, a kitchen, laundry machines, and a large meeting room. This facility was completed in 2019.

Campsites at Ingersoll are divided into three ridges: North, South, and West. A mix of cabins, platform tents, and primitive campsites are available. There are two large shower facilities shared by all campsites, and every campsite has its own latrine and water spigot.

The climbing tower features 3 walls of varying difficulty, a giant's ladder, and a 350-foot zipline to the ground below. The Climbing merit badge is instructed here during summer resident camp. The tower was completed in 2007.

The pool includes changing rooms, showers, and private bathroom facilities. These facilities were rebuilt in 2014.

Lake Roberts is an artificial lake contained entirely within the boundaries of ISR. The lakefront area, completed in 2008, contains a sand beach, a large dock, boat storage, and teaching space. Boating merit badges, including Rowing, Canoeing, and Small Boat Sailing are taught here during the summer months. Across the lake, the Fish Shack contains teaching space for the Fishing and Fly Fishing merit badges, as well as facilities for cleaning and preparing fish.

The shooting sports area features separate ranges for rifles, archery, and shotgun shooting.

Other program facilities at Ingersoll include the Scoutcraft shelter, the Ecology/Conservation building, a STEM area, and an outdoor chapel.

Unique to Ingersoll are historically themed "Outpost" programs, held at special sites. Paul Bunyan is a breakfast program based on a Minnesota logging camp, where troops partake in pancakes cooked on a potbelly stove, throw tomahawks, cut logs with crosscut saws, and play "Loggerball". Horseshoe Bend takes troops far out of the main camp for an Old West dinner program, where they help prepare a chuckwagon feast and learn about blacksmithing and lassoing.

==== History ====
In the late 1950s, the Creve Coeur Council faced growing problems with its existing resident camp, Camp Wokanda. Its facilities, mostly constructed in the 1920s and 1930s, were inadequate, and it was being encroached upon by the urban sprawl of nearby Peoria. In 1960 it was decided that a new camp should be constructed, far enough from civilization that boys' survival skills could be put to the test. Other criteria for this new camp included a lake, a river, and enough space to allow campsites privacy and community. Many sites were considered, but eventually, a 600-acre plot located 36 miles west of Peoria on Illinois Route 116 near London Mills was chosen for its rolling hills, meadows, and natural woodlands, as well as its river access and location within the famous Spoon River country. The site also contained a brick ranch-style house far from the main road, considered perfect for housing a camp ranger.

With a site decided, the Creve Coeur Council then focused its efforts on paying for the land. At $60,000 (roughly $428,000 today), finding the money proved to be difficult. Hoping to find one donor who could cover the whole cost, an appeal was made to William P. Ingersoll, a philanthropist from nearby Canton, Illinois. After confirming for himself the validity of the request, Ingersoll agreed to pay for the entire property on the condition that his donation remains anonymous. So it was that in 1963, Wilderness Camp officially opened for its first camping season. Over the next decade, Ingersoll continued to anonymously fund the camp, allowing for the construction of new buildings and the acquisition of surrounding land, eventually bringing the camp to 960 acres. Following Ingersoll's death in 1972, the camp was renamed Ingersoll Scout Reservation in his honor with the permission of his remaining family.

In 2022, the W. D. Boyce Council authorized the sale of two parcels of Ingersoll Scout Reservation totaling about 300 acres. This land was sold to fulfill the council's obligation to the national Victims Compensation Trust. The parcels included the "far east side" and "cross creek" areas of camp, and consisted mostly of inaccessible wilderness that was seldom utilized for program. The areas sold for $794,538.00 on 6/21/22 to Oak Ridge Farms LLC and then on 7/5/23 they were sold again to Spoon River Acres LLC. for $900,000.00, an increase of over 13.25%.

=== Cache Lake Scout Camp ===
Cache Lake Scout Camp is located at Sand Point Lake Ontario. The original high adventure camp that would evolve into Cache Lake Scout Camp was located approximately 70 miles north of International Falls, Minnesota in an abandoned logging camp on Lake of the Woods at Nestor Falls in 1957. The camp was moved to Browns Bay in Crane Lake in northern Minnesota approximately 3 years later and named Cache Lake Scout Camp. The camp was moved one other time to the north of the Canadian / U.S. border to what is now known as Bach's Bay.

== Wenasa Quenhotan Lodge ==
The council is served by the Wenasa Quenhotan Lodge of the Order of the Arrow, the honor society of Scouting America.

== Membership Controversy & Lawsuits 2024-2026 ==
In April 2024, a dispute during a meeting of Clinton Troop 142 occurred which lead to the expulsion of a long tenured Crew Advisor and the Troop Scoutmaster. The situation has led to multiple lawsuits in which the Crew Advisor charged the Council, Council Executive Ben Blumenberg, as well as other members of the Local Troop with slander and defamation of character. Lawsuits were dismissed before being brought to trial. However, further antagonistic actions from the parties towards the Advisor & his family continue.

== See also ==
- Scouting in Illinois
