= Meredosia Bridge =

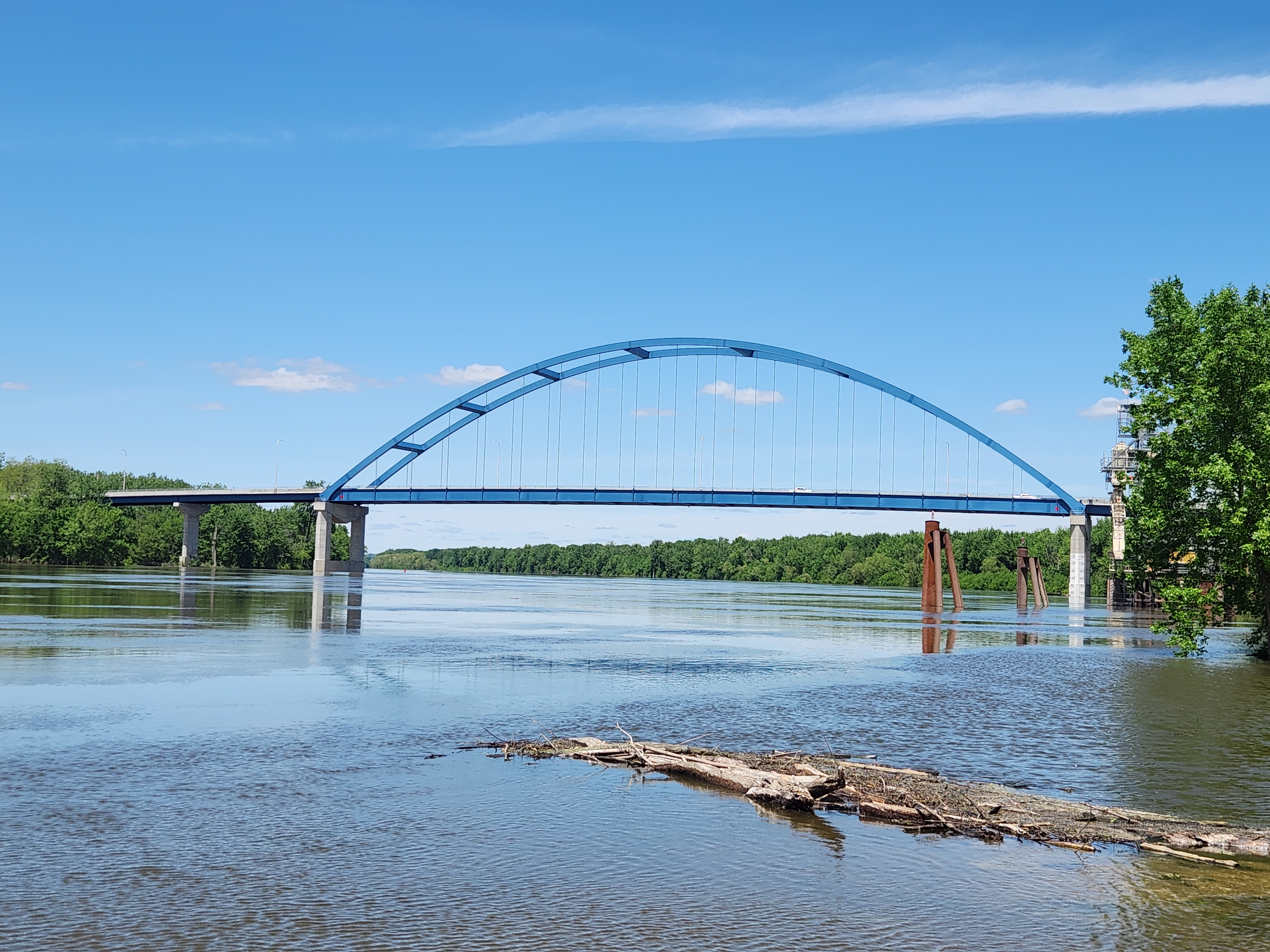
- Coordinates: 39°49′51″N 90°33′57″W
- Carries: IL 104 / IL 99
- Crosses: Illinois River
- Locale: Meredosia, Illinois
- Maintained by: Illinois DOT
- ID number: 000069001615775

Characteristics
- Design: Tied arch
- Total length: 2,232 feet (0.4227 mi; 0.680 km)
- Clearance below: 72 feet (22 m)

History
- Constructed by: Halverson Construction
- Construction start: 2015
- Construction end: 2018
- Construction cost: $86.2 million
- Opened: 2018
- Inaugurated: June 19, 2018

Statistics
- Daily traffic: 2,400 (2005)

The Meredosia Bridge is a two-lane tied-arch bridge constructed in 2018 that carries Illinois Route 104 (IL 104) across the Illinois River between Pike County, Illinois and the city of Meredosia, Morgan County, Illinois. The current bridge was built 250 feet (76 m) north of the old steel truss bridge.
