= Money Creek Township, Houston County, Minnesota =

Money Creek Township, Minnesota
- Township
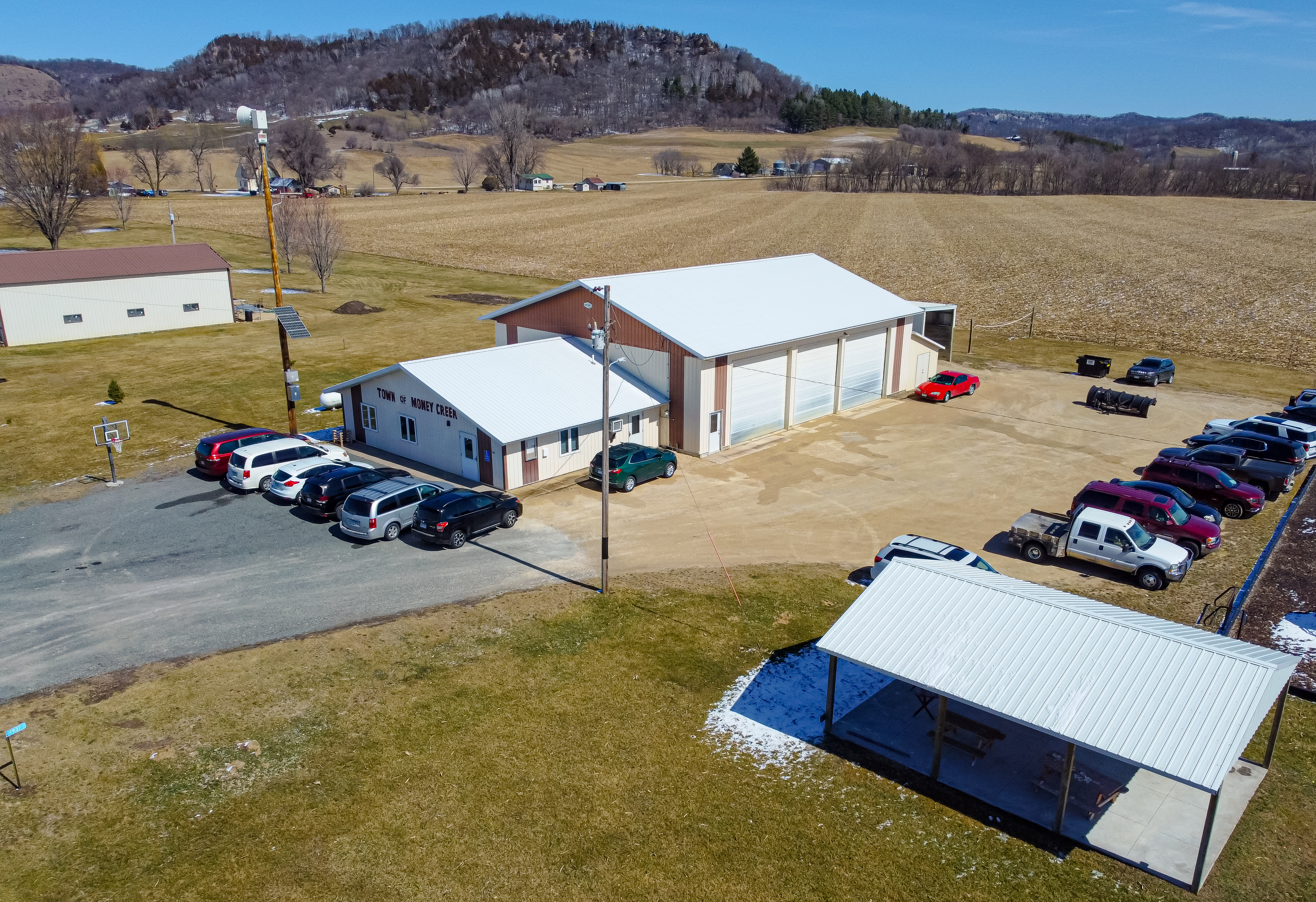
- Town hall

- Location within the state of Minnesota Money Creek Township, Minnesota (the United States)
- Coordinates: 43°48′31″N 91°38′0″W
- Country: United States
- State: Minnesota
- County: Houston

Area
  - Total: 35.8 sq mi (92.6 km^{2})
  - Land: 35.6 sq mi (92.2 km^{2})
  - Water: 0.15 sq mi (0.4 km^{2})
- Elevation: 1,204 ft (367 m)

Population (2000)
  - Total: 547
  - Density: 15/sq mi (5.9/km^{2})
- Time zone: UTC-6 (Central (CST))
  - Summer (DST): UTC-5 (CDT)
- FIPS code: 27-43648
- GNIS feature ID: 0665008
- Website: https://moneycreektwpmn.com/

Money Creek Township is a township in Houston County, Minnesota, United States. The population was 547 at the 2000 census.

== History ==
Money Creek Township was organized in 1858. The township took its name from Money Creek.

== Geography ==
According to the United States Census Bureau, the township has a total area of 35.8 square miles (92.6 km^{2}), of which 35.6 square miles (92.2 km^{2}) is land and 0.2 square mile (0.4 km^{2}) (0.45%) is water.

== Demographics ==
As of the census of 2000, there were 547 people, 203 households, and 159 families residing in the township. The population density was 15.4 people per square mile (5.9/km^{2}). There were 225 housing units at an average density of 6.3/sq mi (2.4/km^{2}). The racial makeup of the township was 99.63% White, 0.18% African American and 0.18% Native American. Hispanic or Latino of any race were 1.10% of the population.

There were 203 households, out of which 35.0% had children under the age of 18 living with them, 67.5% were married couples living together, 5.4% had a female householder with no husband present, and 21.2% were non-families. 15.8% of all households were made up of individuals, and 2.5% had someone living alone who was 65 years of age or older. The average household size was 2.69 and the average family size was 2.99.

In the township the population was spread out, with 27.4% under the age of 18, 6.2% from 18 to 24, 32.2% from 25 to 44, 24.7% from 45 to 64, and 9.5% who were 65 years of age or older. The median age was 38 years. For every 100 females, there were 109.6 males. For every 100 females age 18 and over, there were 106.8 males.

The median income for a household in the township was $37,625, and the median income for a family was $41,000. Males had a median income of $30,707 versus $21,917 for females. The per capita income for the township was $15,632. About 6.6% of families and 8.6% of the population were below the poverty line, including 12.8% of those under age 18 and 9.1% of those age 65 or over.

== See also ==
- Money Creek, Minnesota - unincorporated community
