= Money Creek Township, McLean County, Illinois =

Coordinates: 40°36′48″N 88°51′29″W

Money Creek Township
- Township
- Location in McLean County

- McLean County's location in Illinois
- Country: United States
- State: Illinois
- County: McLean
- Established: November 3, 1857

Area
  - Total: 39.3 sq mi (102 km^{2})
  - Land: 38.81 sq mi (100.5 km^{2})
  - Water: 0.48 sq mi (1.2 km^{2}) 1.22%

Population (2010)
  - Estimate (2016): 1,087
  - Density: 28/sq mi (11/km^{2})
- Time zone: UTC-6 (CST)
  - Summer (DST): UTC-5 (CDT)
- FIPS code: 17-113-49971

Money Creek Township is located in McLean County, Illinois. As of the 2010 census, its population was 1,085, and it contained 511 housing units.

The township took its name from Money Creek.

== Geography ==
According to the 2010 census, the township has a total area of 39.3 square miles (102 km^{2}), of which 38.81 square miles (100.5 km^{2}) (or 98.75%) is land and 0.48 square miles (1.2 km^{2}) (or 1.22%) is water.

== Demographics ==
Historical population
Census	Pop.	Note	%±
2016 (est.)	1,087
U.S. Decennial Census

== Notable people ==
The American frontiersman and preserver of the buffalo, Charles "Buffalo" Jones, was reared at Money Creek during the 1850s.
