= Marseilles Bridge =

- Coordinates: 41.32314°N 88.71036°W
- Carries: La Salle County Route 15
- Crosses: Illinois River
- Locale: Marseilles, Illinois
- Official name: Marseilles Bridge
- Maintained by: Illinois Department of Transportation
- ID number: 000050021931766

Characteristics
- Design: Concrete deck
- Total length: 1,661 feet
- Width: 2 traffic lanes, 30ft (9.6 m)

History
- Construction end: December 1997
- Opened: December 1997

The Marseilles Bridge is a bridge in Marseilles, Illinois.

== History ==
The bridge was completed in December 1997.
