= Hardin Bridge =

Bridge in Illinois

Joe Page Bridge
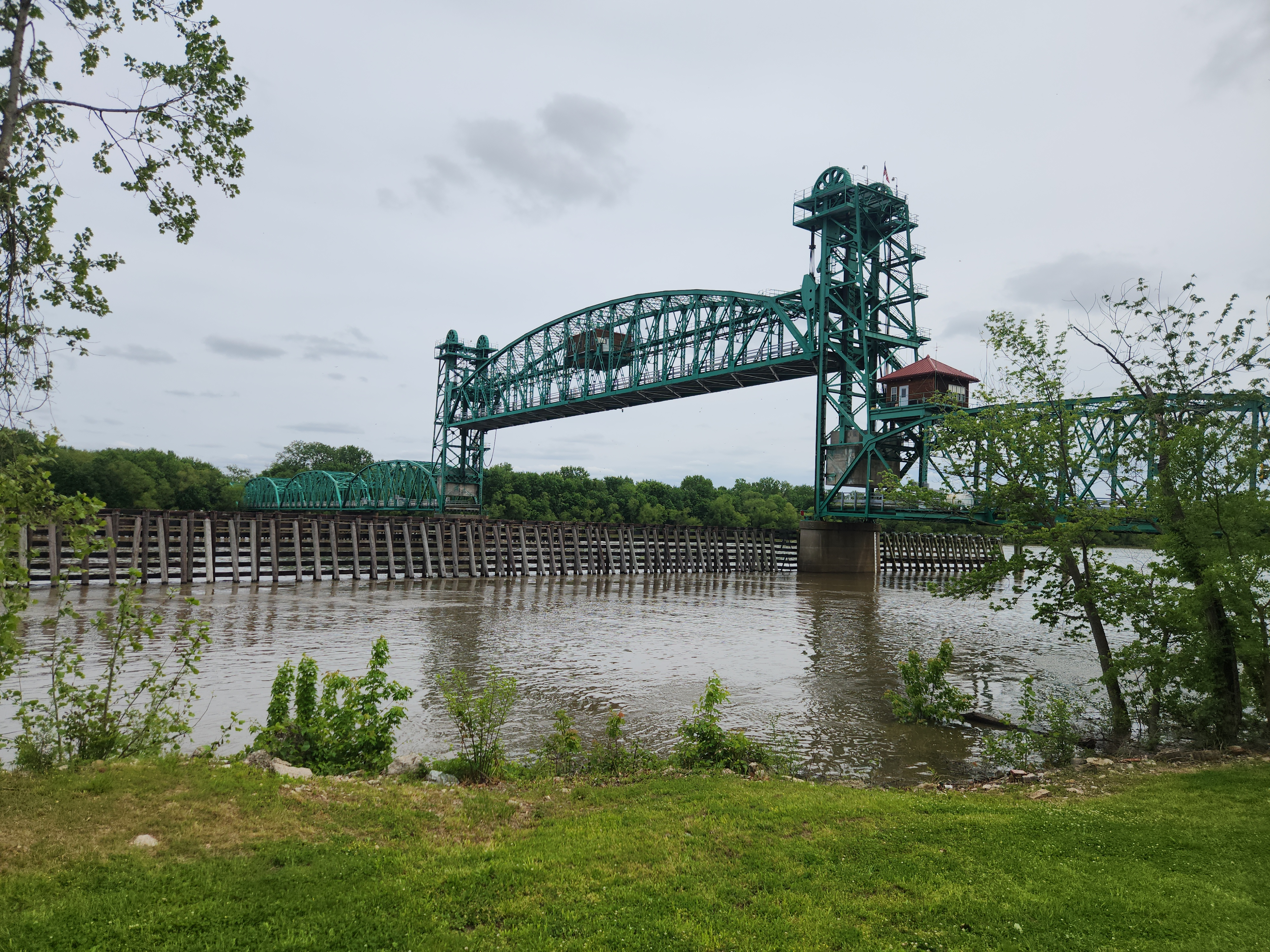
- Coordinates: 39°09′37″N 90°36′49″W
- Carries: IL 16 / IL 100
- Crosses: Illinois River
- Locale: Hardin, Illinois
- Official name: Joe Page Bridge

History
- Opened: 1930

Statistics
- Daily traffic: 11,000

Location
- Interactive map of Joe Page Bridge

The Hardin Bridge is a bridge in Hardin, Illinois that carries Illinois Route 16 and Illinois Route 100 across the Illinois River. The bridge is the southernmost bridge on the river. It is also one of three crossings used by IL 100, the other two being in Florence and Beardstown. The bridge's western abutment is the western terminus of IL 16. It was built in 1930 and rehabilitated in 2003–04.

Dedicated on July 23, 1931, the bridge is named after Joseph M. Page (1845-1938). Page served in the Union Army during the Civil War and settled in Jerseyville after that conflict. Joe Page was involved in politics and served five times as Mayor of Jerseyville. Besides being responsible for the construction of the bridge that is named in his honor, he was instrumental in the creation of Pere Marquette State Park, in the establishing the area's water and electric light plants, and in bringing telephone service into Jerseyville.

In 2008 archaeological investigations were done on the area surrounding the bridge. The dig found evidence of activity dating back to the Woodland period. Remains of single family home was discovered, as well as an lithic workshop. The workshop contained a variety of artifacts and researchers believe that the local quarry was used as a site to collect chert that was used to create tools.
