= Florence, Illinois =

Florence
- Village
- Location of Florence in Pike County, Illinois.
- Coordinates: 39°37′32″N 90°36′34″W
- Country: United States
- State: Illinois
- County: Pike

Area
  - Total: 0.36 sq mi (0.93 km^{2})
  - Land: 0.27 sq mi (0.71 km^{2})
  - Water: 0.081 sq mi (0.21 km^{2})
- Elevation: 443 ft (135 m)

Population (2020)
  - Total: 17
  - Density: 62/sq mi (23.8/km^{2})
- Time zone: UTC-6 (CST)
  - Summer (DST): UTC-5 (CDT)
- ZIP code: 62363
- Area code: 217
- FIPS code: 17-26480
- GNIS feature ID: 2398886

Florence is a village in Pike County, Illinois, United States. The population was 17 at the 2020 census, making Florence the second-least populated municipality in Illinois behind Valley City.

== Geography ==
According to the 2010 census, Florence has a total area of 0.21 square miles (0.54 km^{2}), all land.

== Demographics ==
Historical population
Census	Pop.	Note	%±
1930	105		—
1940	139		32.4%
1950	107		−23.0%
1960	99		−7.5%
1970	65		−34.3%
1980	59		−9.2%
1990	45		−23.7%
2000	71		57.8%
2010	38		−46.5%
2020	17		−55.3%
U.S. Decennial Census

As of the census of 2000, there were 71 people, 30 households, and 21 families residing in the village. The population density was 350.4 inhabitants per square mile (135.3/km^{2}). There were 45 housing units at an average density of 222.1 per square mile (85.8/km^{2}). The racial makeup of the village was 100.00% White.

There were 30 households, out of which 16.7% had children under the age of 18 living with them, 50.0% were married couples living together, 16.7% had a female householder with no husband present, and 30.0% were non-families. 23.3% of all households were made up of individuals, and 13.3% had someone living alone who was 65 years of age or older. The average household size was 2.37 and the average family size was 2.67.

In the village, the population was spread out, with 22.5% under the age of 18, 5.6% from 18 to 24, 22.5% from 25 to 44, 26.8% from 45 to 64, and 22.5% who were 65 years of age or older. The median age was 44 years. For every 100 females, there were 115.2 males. For every 100 females age 18 and over, there were 89.7 males.

The median income for a household in the village was $20,000, and the median income for a family was $22,679. Males had a median income of $19,000 versus $20,625 for females. The per capita income for the village was $9,878. There were 8.0% of families and 15.1% of the population living below the poverty line, including none under 18 and 5.0% of those over 64.
