= Money Creek (Root River tributary) =

Coordinates: 43°46′38″N 91°35′56″W

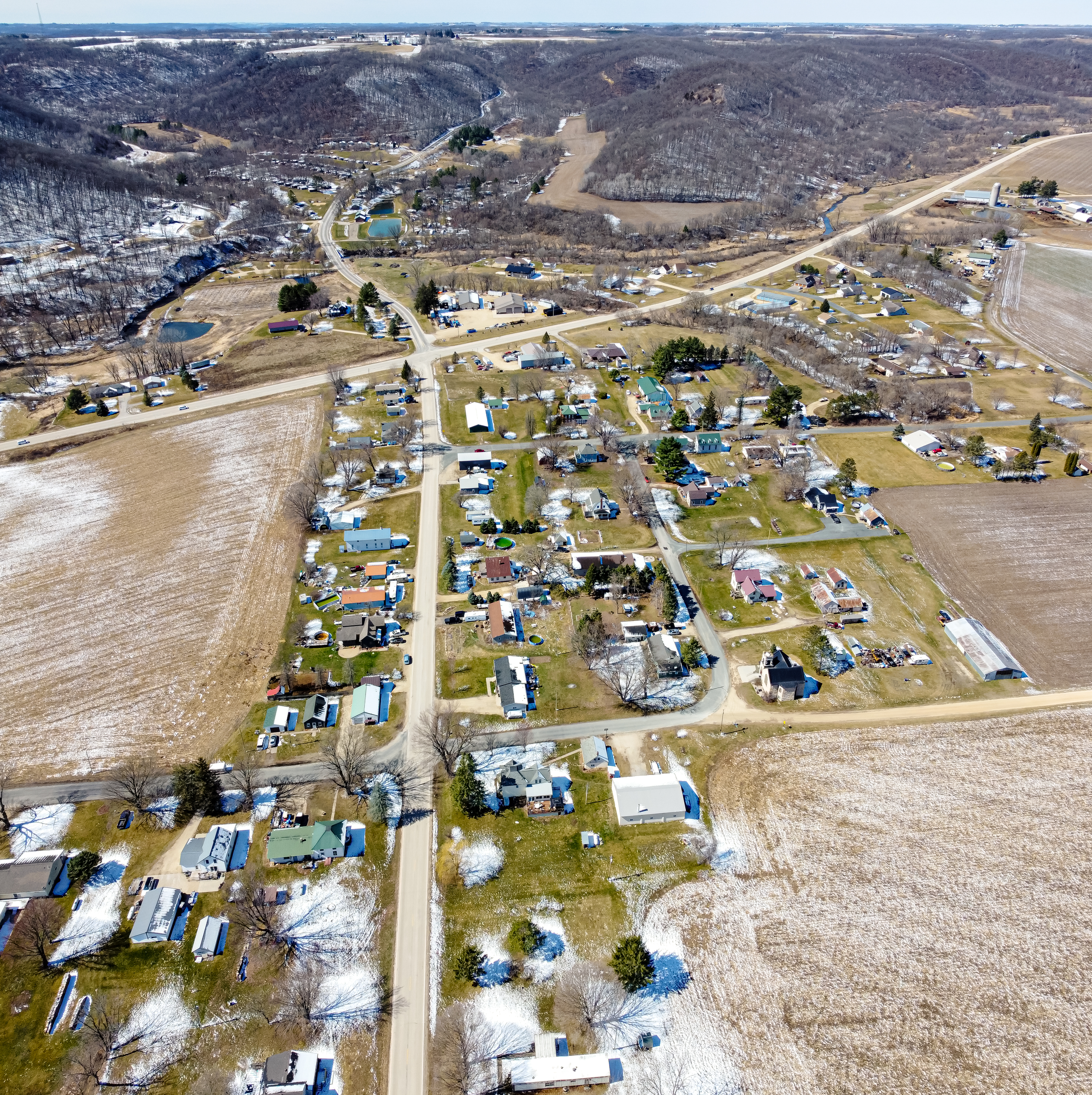
- Money Creek running through the Town of Money Creek, Minnesota

- Location within Minnesota

Location
- Country: United States
- State: Minnesota
- County: Houston, Winona

Basin features
- River system: Root River

Money Creek is a stream in Houston and Winona counties, in the U.S. state of Minnesota. It is a tributary of the Root River. Money Creek was so named when a passerby's money blew into the creek and was lost.

== Habitat ==
According to the Minnesota Department of Natural Resources, species present in Money Creek include Brown trout, white sucker, longnose dace, blacknose dace, central stoneroller, creek chub, hornyhead chub, bluntnose minnow, fathead minnow, suckermouth minnow, common shiner, sand shiner, bigmouth shiner, spotfin shiner, logperch, black bullhead, brook stickleback, Johnny darter and fantail darter.

== See also ==
- List of rivers of Minnesota
