= Lake Bloomington =

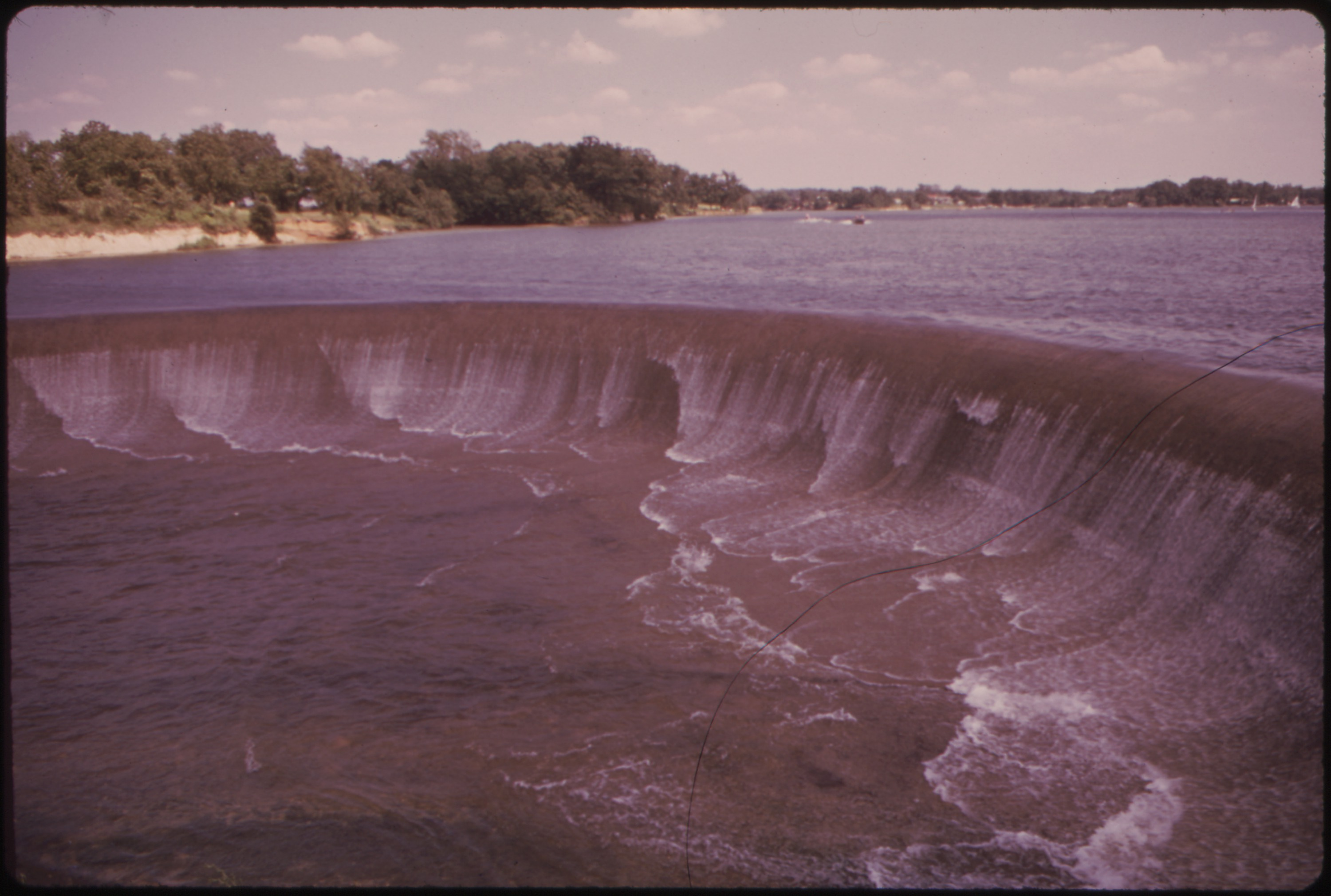
- Lake Bloomington, June 1973

- Location within Illinois
- Location: McLean County, Illinois
- Coordinates: 40°39′41″N 88°56′10″W
- Type: Man-made lake
- Primary inflows: Money Creek
- Basin countries: United States
- Surface area: 635 acres (257 ha)
- Average depth: 14.5 ft (4.4 m)
- Shore length^{1}: 18.5 mi (29.8 km)
- Surface elevation: 719 ft (219 m)
- ^{1} Shore length is not a well-defined measure.

Lake Bloomington is located near Hudson, Illinois, United States. Lake Bloomington is a man-made lake, the original purpose of constructing the lake was to supply Bloomington-Normal with a reliable, primary source of water. Lake Bloomington is fed by Money Creek, whose water source is mostly field runoff from around the Towanda area. There was a need for this water supply, extensive research and construction resulted in the project costing more than the expected amount. The lake has 635 acres (257 ha) and 18.5 miles (29.8 km) of shoreline. The average depth of the lake is 14.5 feet (4.4 m).

== History ==
=== 20th century ===
==== Proposal ====
Due to a typhoid outbreak and a drought in 1920, the community began to consider a new water source. The first meeting to talk about making this water source was held in the 1920s. The meeting included about 10 members and was held at Bloomington City Hall. Egbort Hawk took control of the commission to create Lake Bloomington. The council decided to put out a survey to the people asking who would use the lake for recreational purposes such as swimming, fishing, family activities etc. About 8,500 people responded to the survey saying they would benefit from the lake.

==== Construction ====
L. E. Baker owned the land, and sold it to the City Council so the lake could be built. He sold the land per acre at a price of $185 and over 1,200 acres were purchased by the council. The city had to controversially cut down over 50,000 trees to build the lake. Some records suggest they cut down more than what the City Council told the public. The workers used bonfires to clear the dried brush, but the logs were taken out by train. About twenty different species of fish were transported to Lake Bloomington after construction. Some of the fish species were endangered and were transported to the lake in hope of increasing the population.

The first water from Lake Bloomington reached the city reservoir on March 22, 1930. Lake Bloomington was finished in April 1930. By fall, the full opening of the lake was celebrated along with the 100th birthday of McLean County. The official formal dedication was on August 31, 1930. Slightly less than 30% of the visitors were not from Bloomington.

=== 21st century ===
Lake Bloomington was added to the Illinois list of impaired waters in 2006. Erosion and elevated nitrates and phosphorus are issues.

== Recreation ==
Boating, skiing, and fishing are permitted. The maximum horsepower of motor boats is 40 HP, with a maximum speed of 25 MHP. Crappie fishing is very good with most fish under 10".

=== Fish Limits ===
Fish limits
| FISH | SIZE | CREEL LIMITS |
|---|---|---|
| Large and Smallmouth Bass | Minimum 15” | 3 per day |
| Walleye | Minimum 18” | 3 per day |
| Northern Pike | Minimum 24” | 3 per day |
| Hybrid Striped Bass | | 10 fish daily harvest limit with no more than 3 fish greater than or equal to 17" |
| White, Black or Hybrid Crappie | No Minimum Length | 15 per day |
| Bluegill or Redear Sunfish | No Minimum Length | 25 per day |
