= LaSalle Township, LaSalle County, Illinois =

Coordinates: 41°20′00″N 89°06′00″W

LaSalle Township
- Township
- Location in LaSalle County

- LaSalle County's location in Illinois
- Country: United States
- State: Illinois
- County: LaSalle
- Established: Unknown

Area
  - Total: 17.52 sq mi (45.4 km^{2})
  - Land: 16.86 sq mi (43.7 km^{2})
  - Water: 0.66 sq mi (1.7 km^{2}) 3.77%

Population (2020)
  - Total: 13,369
  - Density: 792.9/sq mi (306.2/km^{2})
- Time zone: UTC-6 (CST)
  - Summer (DST): UTC-5 (CDT)
- FIPS code: 17-099-42197

LaSalle Township is located in LaSalle County, Illinois. As of the 2020 census, its population was 13,369 and it contained 6,388 housing units. LaSalle Township was formed from Peru Township on an unknown date.

== Climate ==
Climate data for La Salle, Illinois
Month	Jan	Feb	Mar	Apr	May	Jun	Jul	Aug	Sep	Oct	Nov	Dec	Year
Mean daily maximum °F (°C)	31.7 (−0.2)	37.6 (3.1)	50.0 (10.0)	62.4 (16.9)	73.3 (22.9)	82.7 (28.2)	87.0 (30.6)	84.7 (29.3)	77.3 (25.2)	65.9 (18.8)	49.6 (9.8)	36.5 (2.5)	61.6 (16.4)
Mean daily minimum °F (°C)	13.3 (−10.4)	18.2 (−7.7)	28.7 (−1.8)	39.4 (4.1)	50.5 (10.3)	60.0 (15.6)	64.3 (17.9)	62.3 (16.8)	53.6 (12.0)	42.3 (5.7)	30.5 (−0.8)	19.2 (−7.1)	40.2 (4.6)
Average precipitation inches (mm)	1.5 (38)	1.7 (43)	2.9 (74)	3.8 (97)	4.6 (120)	4.4 (110)	4.5 (110)	3.5 (89)	4.0 (100)	2.8 (71)	3.1 (79)	2.3 (58)	39.1 (990)
Source: Weatherbase

== Geography ==
According to the 2021 census gazetteer files, LaSalle Township has a total area of 17.52 square miles (45.38 km^{2}), of which 16.86 square miles (43.67 km^{2}) (or 96.23%) is land and 0.66 square miles (1.71 km^{2}) (or 3.77%) is water.

== Demographics ==
As of the 2020 census there were 13,369 people, 5,349 households, and 3,326 families residing in the township. The population density was 763.03 inhabitants per square mile (294.61/km^{2}). There were 6,388 housing units at an average density of 364.59 per square mile (140.77/km^{2}). The racial makeup of the township was 82.68% White, 1.97% African American, 0.52% Native American, 0.75% Asian, 0.01% Pacific Islander, 4.79% from other races, and 9.29% from two or more races. Hispanic or Latino of any race were 14.95% of the population.

There were 5,349 households, out of which 27.30% had children under the age of 18 living with them, 43.78% were married couples living together, 12.25% had a female householder with no spouse present, and 37.82% were non-families. 28.70% of all households were made up of individuals, and 11.70% had someone living alone who was 65 years of age or older. The average household size was 2.34 and the average family size was 2.93.

The township's age distribution consisted of 21.6% under the age of 18, 8.8% from 18 to 24, 25.7% from 25 to 44, 24.8% from 45 to 64, and 18.9% who were 65 years of age or older. The median age was 40.0 years. For every 100 females, there were 104.8 males. For every 100 females age 18 and over, there were 103.1 males.

The median income for a household in the township was $53,286, and the median income for a family was $59,274. Males had a median income of $44,382 versus $26,115 for females. The per capita income for the township was $27,366. About 10.4% of families and 14.2% of the population were below the poverty line, including 22.4% of those under age 18 and 9.2% of those age 65 or over.

Historical population
Census	Pop.	Note	%±
2010	13,565		—
2020	13,369		−1.4%
U.S. Decennial Census
