= Illinois Route 251 =

North-south state highway in Illinois, US

Illinois Route 251
- IL 251 highlighted in red

Route information
- Maintained by IDOT
- Length: 135.32 mi (217.78 km)
- Existed: Early 1970s–present

Major junctions
- South end: I-39 / US 51 in Hudson
- US 24 in El Paso; I-39 / US 51 in LaSalle; US 6 in Peru; I-80 in Peru; US 52 in Troy Grove; US 34 in Mendota; US 52 in Mendota; US 30 in Compton; I-88 Toll / IL 110 (CKC) in Rochelle; US 20 in Rockford
- North end: US 51 / IL 75 in South Beloit

Location
- Country: United States
- State: Illinois
- Counties: McLean, Woodford, Marshall, LaSalle, Lee, Ogle, Winnebago

Highway system
- Illinois State Highway System; Interstate; US; State; Tollways; Scenic
← IL 250	→ I-255

Illinois Route 251 is a north–south state highway that runs on the former alignment of U.S. Route 51 before Interstate 39 was built in north central Illinois. It runs from U.S. 51 at the border with Wisconsin to I-39 and U.S. 51 south of Kappa. Illinois 251 is 135.32 miles (217.78 km) long.

== Route description ==
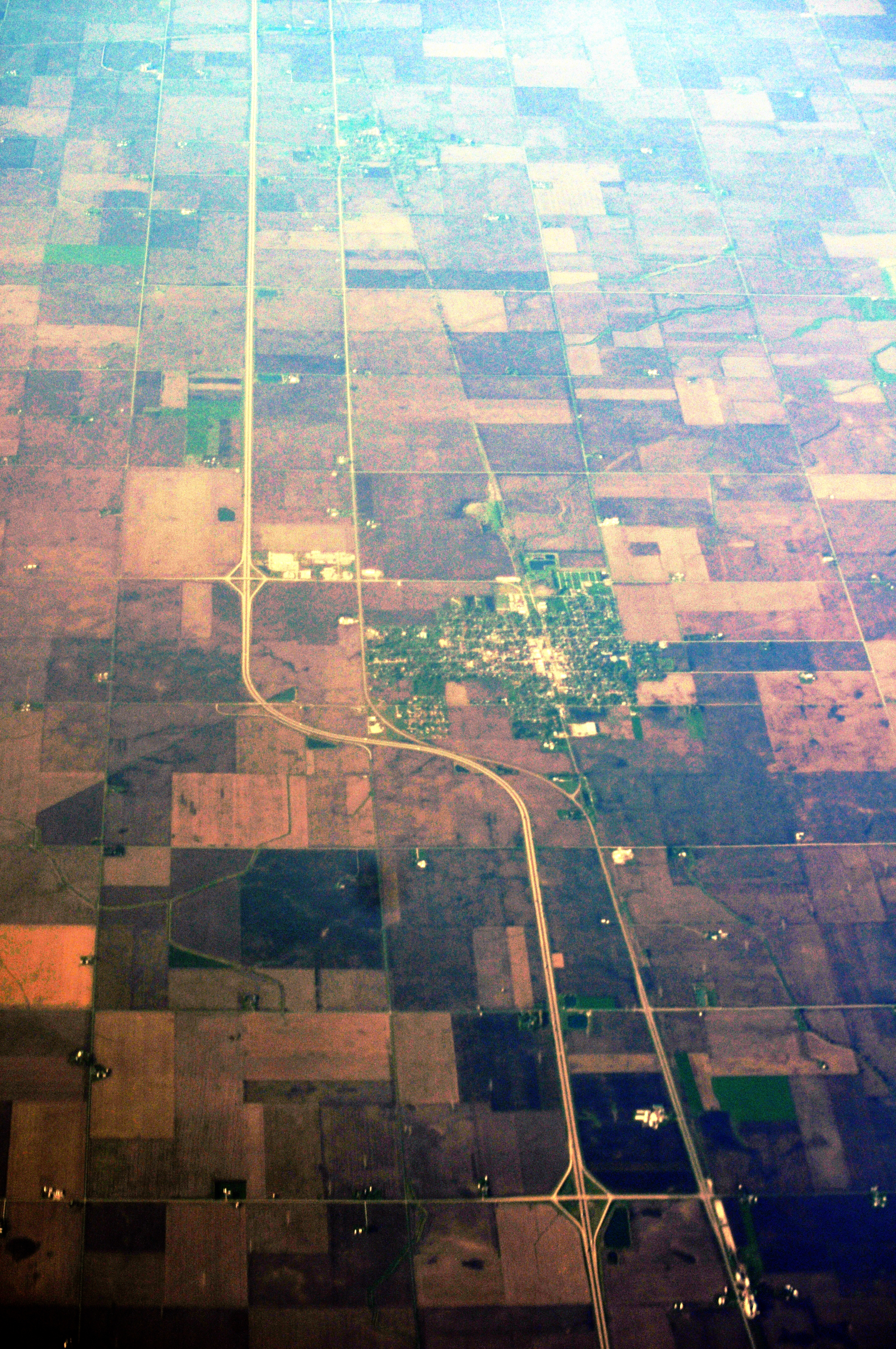
Aerial view of I-39 (left) and IL 251 (right) in Minonk

Illinois 251 runs parallel to Interstate 39 and U.S. 51 for most of the length of I-39 in Illinois. Like Illinois Route 351, it can be considered a spur, loop or alternate of its parent route, U.S. 51. Illinois 251 terminates about 8 mi (13 km) north of the southern terminus of I-39.

The road parallels the east bank of the Rock River through Rockford, where the highway goes north on Eleventh Street, west on Harrison, north on Kishwaukee, west on Walnut then split between northbound Third and southbound Second through downtown Rockford. After downtown, both directions take the southbound lanes' Second Street name as a divided urban expressway (also badged as Martin Luther King Jr. Memorial Drive) for a couple of miles north of downtown Rockford. It stays Second Street through Loves Park, Machesney Park and Roscoe until its north endpoint at US 51 and Illinois 75 in South Beloit, .25 miles (0.40 km) short of the Wisconsin state line.

== History ==
Illinois 251 was established in 1982 when the first segment of I-39 opened between Rockford and Bloomington. In 1992, the final segment of I-39 opened north of Bloomington. The remaining stretch of former U.S. 51 became Illinois 251. The initial designation of I-39 was U.S. Route 51 until 1992.

== Major intersections ==
County	Location	mi	km	Destinations	Notes
McLean		0.0	0.0	I-39 / US 51 – Bloomington–Normal, Rockford	Southern terminus; I-39 exit 8
Woodford	El Paso	7.1	11.4	US 24 (West Main Street)	
Woodford		15.2	24.5	IL 116 west	South end of IL 116 overlap
Woodford		16.2	26.1	IL 116 east	North end of IL 116 overlap
Marshall		27.6	44.4	IL 17 west	South end of IL 17 overlap
Marshall	Wenona	29.6	47.6	IL 17 east (Elm Street)	North end of IL 17 overlap
LaSalle		34.6	55.7	IL 18 (North 13th Road)	
LaSalle	Tonica	41.7	67.1	CR 54 (Ray Richardson Road, Ed Lambert Road)	
LaSalle		44.8	72.1	IL 71 / IL 351 north	
LaSalle		45.6	73.4	I-39 / US 51 – Bloomington–Normal, Rockford	I-39 exit 52
LaSalle	Illinois River	49.6	79.8	Peru Bridge	
LaSalle	Peru	49.8	80.1	US 6 – LaSalle, Spring Valley	Interchange
LaSalle		52.5	84.5	I-80 – Moline, Rock Island, Joliet	I-80 exit 75
LaSalle		55.7	89.6	CR 33 (North 33rd Road)	
LaSalle		59.7	96.1	US 52 east (North 37th Road)	South end of US 52 overlap
LaSalle	Mendota	65.1	104.8	US 34 (Washington Street, Walter Payton Memorial Highway)	
LaSalle	Mendota	66.1	106.4	US 52 west	North end of US 52 overlap
Lee		81.6	131.3	US 30	
Ogle	Rochelle	91.7	147.6	I-88 Toll / IL 110 (CKC) (Ronald Reagan Memorial Tollway) – Chicago, Moline, Rock Island	I-88 exit 76
Ogle	Rochelle	93.1	149.8	IL 38 west / Lincoln Highway (Lincoln Avenue)	South end of IL 38 overlap
Ogle	Rochelle	94.0	151.3	IL 38 east / Lincoln Highway (May Mart Drive)	North end of IL 38 overlap
Ogle	Hillcrest	99.0	159.3	IL 64	
Ogle	Davis Junction	105.8	170.3	IL 72 (Chicago Avenue)	
Winnebago	Rockford	114.0	183.5	US 20 (Rockford Bypass, Ulysses S. Grant Memorial Highway) – Freeport, Belvidere	Interchange
Winnebago	Rockford	118.1	190.1	US 20 Bus. (1st Avenue, Jefferson Street)	
Winnebago	Rockford	118.7	191.0	Whitman Street Bridge	Interchange
Winnebago	Rockford	120.1	193.3	Auburn Street, Spring Creek Road	Interchange
Winnebago	Rockford	120.6	194.1	Forest Hills Road	Northbound exit and southbound entrance
Winnebago	Machesney Park	125.7	202.3	IL 173 east (West Lane Road)	
Winnebago	Roscoe	132.8	213.7	CR 76 (Prairie Hill Road)	
Winnebago	Rockton	133.8	215.3	CR 9 (Rockton Road)	Interchange
Winnebago	South Beloit	135.32	217.78	US 51 / IL 75 (Gardner Street)	Northern terminus
1.000 mi = 1.609 km; 1.000 km = 0.621 mi: Concurrency terminus; Incomplete access
