= Oglesby, Illinois =

Oglesby
- City
- City of Oglesby
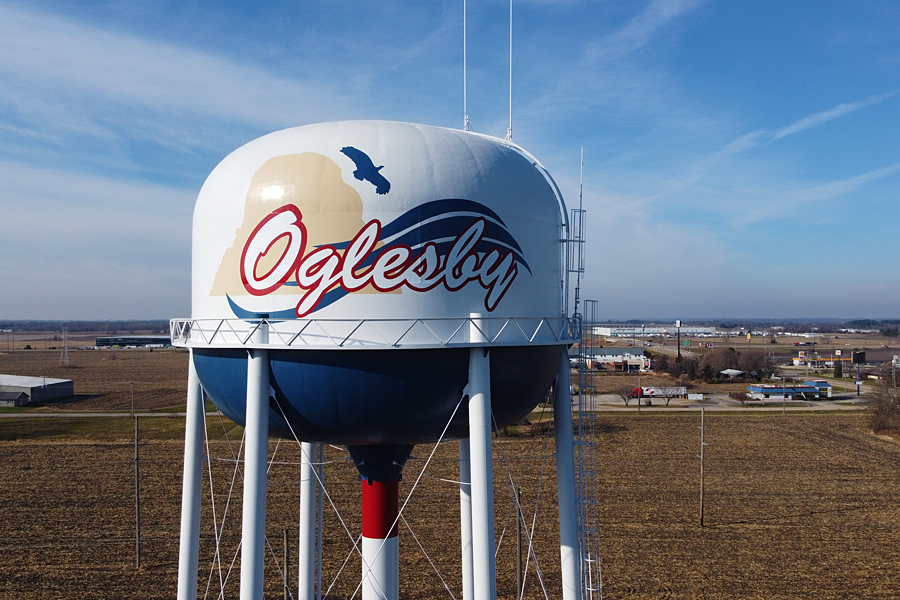
- City water tower

- Location of Oglesby in LaSalle County, Illinois.
- Coordinates: 41°17′36″N 89°04′16″W
- Country: United States
- State: Illinois
- County: LaSalle
- Township: LaSalle
- First settled: 1865
- Incorporated: 1902 as Portland
- Renamed: 1913 as Oglesby

Government
  - Type: City commission government
  - Mayor: Jason Curran

Area
  - Total: 4.99 sq mi (12.93 km^{2})
  - Land: 4.99 sq mi (12.93 km^{2})
  - Water: 0 sq mi (0.00 km^{2})
- Elevation: 633 ft (193 m)

Population (2020)
  - Total: 3,712
  - Estimate (2024): 3,626
  - Density: 743.6/sq mi (287.11/km^{2})
- Time zone: UTC−6 (CST)
  - Summer (DST): UTC−5 (CDT)
- ZIP code: 61348
- Area code: 815
- FIPS code: 17-55353
- GNIS feature ID: 2395310
- Website: www.oglesby.il.us

Oglesby is a city in LaSalle County, Illinois, United States. The population was 3,712 at the 2020 census, down from 3,791 at the 2010 census. It is part of the Ottawa Micropolitan Statistical Area.

== History ==
Oglesby was a center for mining coal, limestone, and silica, located near the confluence of the Illinois River and the north-flowing Vermilion River. Oglesby grew from an amalgamation of several mining villages, such as Kenosha, Portland, and Black Hollow. It was originally called Portland, due to the cement mined and manufactured in the area that was similar to Portland Cement from England. It was renamed in 1913 after the coal company and in honor of Richard J. Oglesby (1824–1899), a former U.S. Senator and three-time Governor of Illinois.

During the Civil War, the Kenosha Coal Company sank a coal mining shaft at Oglesby in 1865. Thatcher Tucker Bent purchased the mine and mineral rights as the Oglesby Coal Company. The mine was innovative and the Bents were very involved in the development of the community. Mrs. Josephine Bent even organized English classes for the immigrant miners' wives. The Marquette Cement Manufacturing Company mined limestone and claimed that the Bent's mine was causing collapses. The conflict eventually liquidated the Oglesby Coal Company, with the Bent selling the machinery to Marquette and auctioning off the farm animals. The Black Hollow Mine was dug in the 1890s as a slope mine along the Vermilion River. It provided coal to its owners, the Illinois Zinc Company in Peru, Illinois.

The surface ground layers around Oglesby had excellent exposed limestone and coal; Oglesby also had adequate riverine transport. It soon became an important center for cement manufacture. Before open-pit mining, there were several subsurface cement mines:

- Illinois Clay Products Mine, 1913–1924
- Reynolds Clay Mine
- Marquette Cement Mine

As well as several coal mines:

- Jones Mine, 1865–1930
- Oglesby Mine, 1865–1919
- Deer Park Mine, 1900–1920
- Black Hollow Mine, circa 1890s

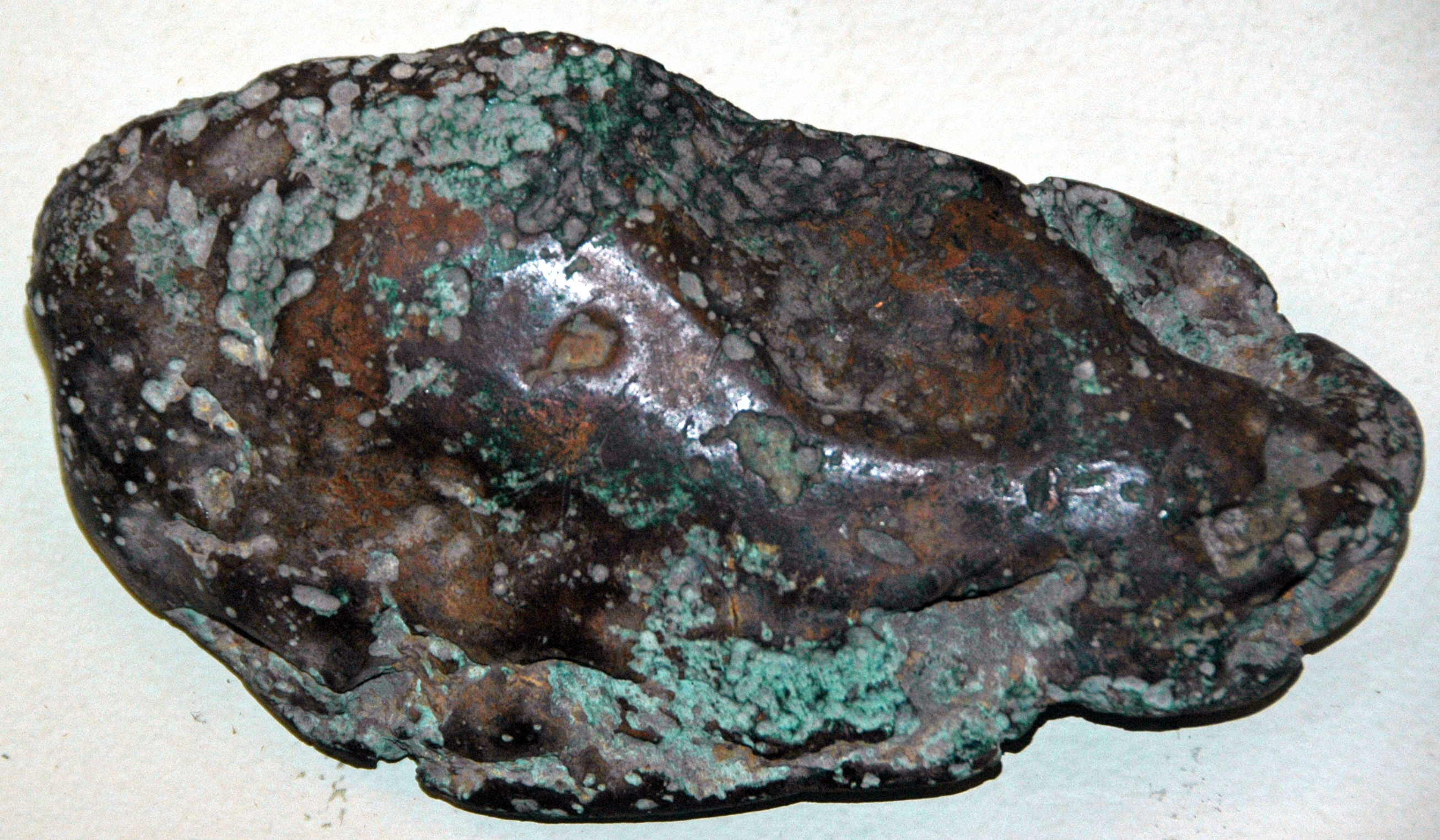
Copper glacial boulder found in a Pleistocene glacial deposit at Oglesby, Illinois. The glaciers moved this rock about 450 miles from its probable source, Michigan’s Keweenaw Peninsula. On display at the Field Museum of Natural History.

=== State parks ===
Matthiessen State Park and Starved Rock State Park are located a few miles east on Illinois State Route 178. With over two million visitors a year, Starved Rock is the most visited of any Illinois state park.

== Geography ==
According to the 2010 census, Oglesby has a total area of 4.11 square miles (10.64 km^{2}), all land.

== Demographics ==
Historical population
Census	Pop.	Note	%±
1910	3,194		—
1920	4,135		29.5%
1930	3,910		−5.4%
1940	3,938		0.7%
1950	3,922		−0.4%
1960	4,215		7.5%
1970	4,175		−0.9%
1980	3,979		−4.7%
1990	3,619		−9.0%
2000	3,647		0.8%
2010	3,791		3.9%
2020	3,712		−2.1%
U.S. Decennial Census

=== 2020 census ===
As of the 2020 census, Oglesby had a population of 3,712. The population density was 743.59 inhabitants per square mile (287.10/km^{2}). 94.0% of residents lived in urban areas, while 6.0% lived in rural areas.

The median age was 41.4 years. 23.2% of residents were under the age of 18 and 18.0% of residents were 65 years of age or older. For every 100 females there were 97.4 males, and for every 100 females age 18 and over there were 95.7 males age 18 and over.

There were 1,609 households in Oglesby, of which 28.2% had children under the age of 18 living in them. Of all households, 45.2% were married-couple households, 19.8% were households with a male householder and no spouse or partner present, and 26.4% were households with a female householder and no spouse or partner present. About 34.0% of all households were made up of individuals and 14.7% had someone living alone who was 65 years of age or older.

There were 1,780 housing units at an average density of 356.57 per square mile (137.67/km^{2}). Of all housing units, 9.6% were vacant. The homeowner vacancy rate was 2.1% and the rental vacancy rate was 13.1%.

Racial composition as of the 2020 census
Race	Number	Percent
White	3,350	90.2%
Black or African American	17	0.5%
American Indian and Alaska Native	14	0.4%
Asian	25	0.7%
Native Hawaiian and Other Pacific Islander	0	0.0%
Some other race	60	1.6%
Two or more races	246	6.6%
Hispanic or Latino (of any race)	304	8.2%

=== Income and poverty ===
The median income for a household in the city was $61,250, and the median income for a family was $70,260. Males had a median income of $51,642 versus $28,393 for females. The per capita income for the city was $29,569. About 4.7% of families and 6.3% of the population were below the poverty line, including 8.3% of those under age 18 and 5.3% of those age 65 or over.

== Education ==
Oglesby Lincoln School, Oglesby Washington School, Holy Family Parochial School, and Illinois Valley Community College are located in Oglesby.

== Arts and culture ==
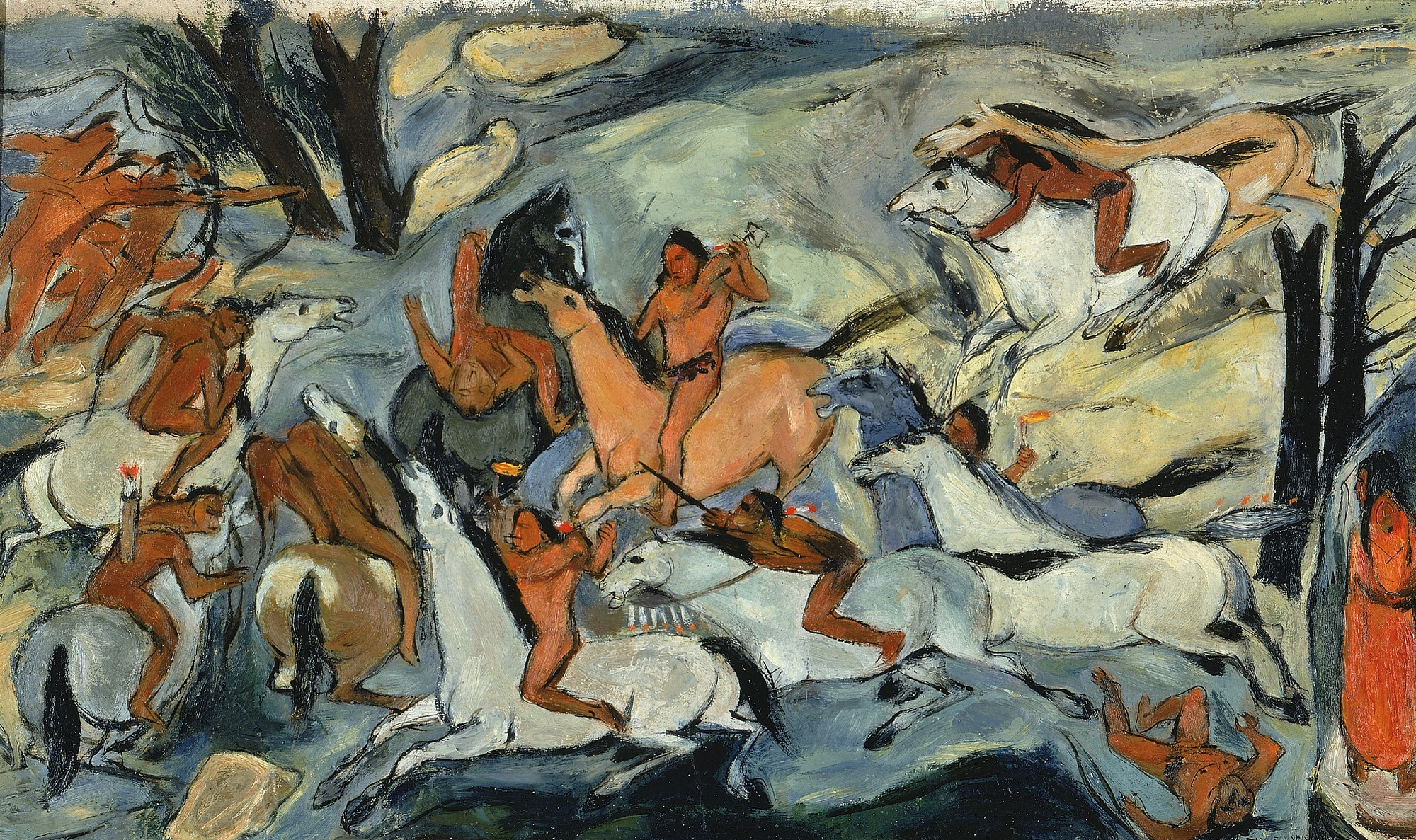
1942 WPA mural The Illini and Potawatomies Struggle at Starved Rock

Murals were produced in the United States through the Section of Painting and Sculpture, later called the Section of Fine Arts, of the Treasury Department from 1934 to 1943. They were intended to boost the morale of the American people suffering from the effects of the Depression by depicting uplifting subjects. In 1942 artist Fay E. Davis painted an oil on canvas mural titled The Illini and Potawatomies Struggle at Starved Rock in the town's post office. The mural's muted earth tones faded badly over time and it was restored in 1988. In 1993 a post office janitor complained about the nudity of the features of the Native Americans depicted in the mural. The painting was covered by a venetian blind and only revealed upon request. A successful petition drive to remove the blinds began soon after.

== Transportation ==
While there is no fixed-route transit service in Oglesby, intercity bus service is provided by Burlington Trailways in nearby Peru.

== Notable people ==
- Jim Bottomley, first baseman for the St. Louis Cardinals, Cincinnati Reds and St. Louis Browns
- Frank Lamanske, pitcher for the Brooklyn Dodgers
- Bo Molenda, fullback (and later coach) for the Green Bay Packers and New York Giants; born in Oglesby
- Walt Tauscher, pitcher for the Pittsburgh Pirates and Washington Senators
