= Woodland Township, Illinois =

Woodland Township, Illinois may refer to one of the following townships:

- Woodland Township, Carroll County, Illinois
- Woodland Township, Fulton County, Illinois

See also

- Woodland Township (disambiguation)
