= Lee Township, Fulton County, Illinois =

Lee Township
- Township
- Location in Fulton County

- Fulton County's location in Illinois
- Coordinates: 40°35′14″N 90°23′31″W
- Country: United States
- State: Illinois
- County: Fulton
- Established: November 6, 1849

Area
  - Total: 37.18 sq mi (96.3 km^{2})
  - Land: 37.18 sq mi (96.3 km^{2})
  - Water: 0 sq mi (0 km^{2}) 0%
- Elevation: 633 ft (193 m)

Population (2020)
  - Total: 230
  - Density: 6.2/sq mi (2.4/km^{2})
- Time zone: UTC-6 (CST)
  - Summer (DST): UTC-5 (CDT)
- ZIP codes: 61415, 61431, 61459, 61477
- FIPS code: 17-057-42574

Lee Township is one of twenty-six townships in Fulton County, Illinois, USA. As of the 2020 census, its population was 230 and it contained 99 housing units.

== Geography ==
According to the 2021 census gazetteer files, Lee Township has a total area of 37.18 square miles (96.30 km^{2}), of which 37.18 square miles (96.30 km^{2}) (or 100.00%) is land and 0.00 square miles (0.00 km^{2}) (or 0.00%) is water.

=== Unincorporated towns ===
- Babylon
- Checkrow
- Manley

(This list is based on USGS data and may include former settlements.)

=== Extinct towns ===
- Virgil
- Oak Grove

=== Cemeteries ===
The township contains these six cemeteries: Barnes, Checkrow, Guernsey, Peirsol, Rigdon and Virgil.

Peirsol Cemetery was a family cemetery which many at one time scattered the county. Like many it was abandoned & is in poor condition if not destroyed.

Guernsey Cemetery is a cemetery off route 9; it too is in very poor condition & overgrown with brush.

=== Major highways ===
- Illinois Route 9
- Illinois Route 41

== Demographics ==
As of the 2020 census there were 230 people, 150 households, and 91 families residing in the township. The population density was 6.19 inhabitants per square mile (2.39/km^{2}). There were 99 housing units at an average density of 2.66 per square mile (1.03/km^{2}). The racial makeup of the township was 96.09% White, 0.00% African American, 0.00% Native American, 0.00% Asian, 0.00% Pacific Islander, 0.43% from other races, and 3.48% from two or more races. Hispanic or Latino of any race were 1.74% of the population.

There were 150 households, out of which 20.00% had children under the age of 18 living with them, 52.67% were married couples living together, none had a female householder with no spouse present, and 39.33% were non-families. 36.00% of all households were made up of individuals, and 4.00% had someone living alone who was 65 years of age or older. The average household size was 1.94 and the average family size was 2.44.

The township's age distribution consisted of 9.6% under the age of 18, 1.4% from 18 to 24, 22.6% from 25 to 44, 49.4% from 45 to 64, and 16.8% who were 65 years of age or older. The median age was 52.5 years. For every 100 females, there were 77.4 males. For every 100 females age 18 and over, there were 70.8 males.

The median income for a household in the township was $87,273, and the median income for a family was $66,964. Males had a median income of $51,591 versus $34,659 for females. The per capita income for the township was $49,525. About 5.5% of families and 3.4% of the population were below the poverty line, including 17.9% of those under age 18 and none of those age 65 or over.

Historical population
Census	Pop.	Note	%±
2000	219		—
2010	237		8.2%
2020	230		−3.0%
U.S. Decennial Census

== School districts ==
- Avon Community Unit School District 176
- Bushnell Prairie City Community Unit School District 170
- Spoon River Valley Community Unit School District 4

== Political districts ==
- Illinois's 17th congressional district
- State House District 94
- State Senate District 47
