= Tampico Mounds =

Archaeological site in Illinois, United States

- U.S. National Register of Historic Places
- Location within Illinois Location within the United States
- Nearest city: Maples Mill, Illinois
- Area: 2.5 acres (1.0 ha)
- NRHP reference No.: 79000838
- Added to NRHP: May 14, 1979

The Tampico Mounds are a prehistoric archaeological site located in Fulton County, Illinois near the community of Maples Mill. The site contains three circular mounds in a 2.5-acre (1.0 ha) space; while there were originally six mounds at the site, the remainder have been destroyed. It was occupied from roughly 750 to 1000 A.D. during the Late Woodland period and is the type site for the Maples Mills culture. As one of two major Late Woodland sites in the Spoon River vicinity, the site provides evidence of regional practices prior to the influence of the Mississippian culture. It also provides potential insight into Maples Mills cultural burial practices as one of the only known burial mound sites linked to the culture.

The site was added to the National Register of Historic Places on May 14, 1979.
