= Kerton Township, Fulton County, Illinois =

Kerton Township
- Township
- Location in Fulton County

- Fulton County's location in Illinois
- Coordinates: 40°14′29″N 90°10′55″W
- Country: United States
- State: Illinois
- County: Fulton
- Established: November 6, 1849

Area
  - Total: 26.95 sq mi (69.8 km^{2})
  - Land: 24.30 sq mi (62.9 km^{2})
  - Water: 2.64 sq mi (6.8 km^{2}) 9.81%
- Elevation: 433 ft (132 m)

Population (2020)
  - Total: 79
  - Density: 3.3/sq mi (1.3/km^{2})
- Time zone: UTC-6 (CST)
  - Summer (DST): UTC-5 (CDT)
- ZIP codes: 61501 62644
- FIPS code: 17-057-39714

Kerton Township is one of twenty-six townships in Fulton County, Illinois, USA. As of the 2020 census, its population was 79 and it contained 68 housing units.

== Geography ==
According to the 2021 census gazetteer files, Kerton Township has a total area of 26.95 square miles (69.80 km^{2}), of which 24.30 square miles (62.94 km^{2}) (or 90.19%) is land and 2.64 square miles (6.84 km^{2}) (or 9.81%) is water.

=== Unincorporated towns ===
- Enion
- Marbletown

(This list is based on USGS data and may include former settlements.)

- West Point
- Seahorn
- Hickory
- West Matanza
- Kerton Valley
- Cluny

=== Cemeteries ===
The township contains Hickory Cemetery.

=== Major highways ===
- Illinois Route 100

=== Lakes ===
- Anderson Lake

== Demographics ==
As of the 2020 census there were 79 people, 44 households, and 0 families residing in the township. The population density was 2.93 inhabitants per square mile (1.13/km^{2}). There were 68 housing units at an average density of 2.52 per square mile (0.97/km^{2}). The racial makeup of the township was 98.73% White, 0.00% African American, 0.00% Native American, 0.00% Asian, 0.00% Pacific Islander, 0.00% from other races, and 1.27% from two or more races. Hispanic or Latino of any race were 0.00% of the population.

There were 44 households, out of which none had children under the age of 18 living with them, none were married couples living together, none had a female householder with no spouse present, and 100.00% were non-families. 75.00% of all households were made up of individuals, and 18.20% had someone living alone who was 65 years of age or older. The average household size was 1.18.

The township's age distribution consisted of 0.0% under the age of 18, 15.4% from 18 to 24, 52% from 25 to 44, 17.3% from 45 to 64, and 15.4% who were 65 years of age or older. The median age was 41.4 years. For every 100 females, there were 550.0 males.

The median income for a household in the township was $75,625. The per capita income for the township was $65,963. About 32.7% of the population was below the poverty line.

Historical population
Census	Pop.	Note	%±
2000	144		—
2010	121		−16.0%
2020	79		−34.7%
U.S. Decennial Census

== School districts ==
- Lewistown School District 97

== Political districts ==
- Illinois' 17th congressional district
- State House District 94
- State Senate District 47
