= Orion Township =

Orion Township may refer to the following places in the United States:

- Orion Township, Fulton County, Illinois
- Orion Township, Michigan (Orion Charter Township)
- Orion Township, Olmsted County, Minnesota

== See also ==
- Orion (disambiguation)
