= Summum (disambiguation) =

Summum is a religion and philosophy.

Summum may also refer to:

- Summum, Illinois, an unincorporated community in Fulton County, Illinois, United States
- Summum (Grenoble), a concert hall in Grenoble, France

== See also ==
- Summum bonum, Latin for "the highest good"
- Summum Chiefs, presently Jonquière Marquis, a Quebec ice hockey team, known previously as Laval Summum Chiefs (2005–2006) and St-Jean Summum Chiefs (2006–2008)
