= Ipava, Illinois =

Village in the United States

- Village
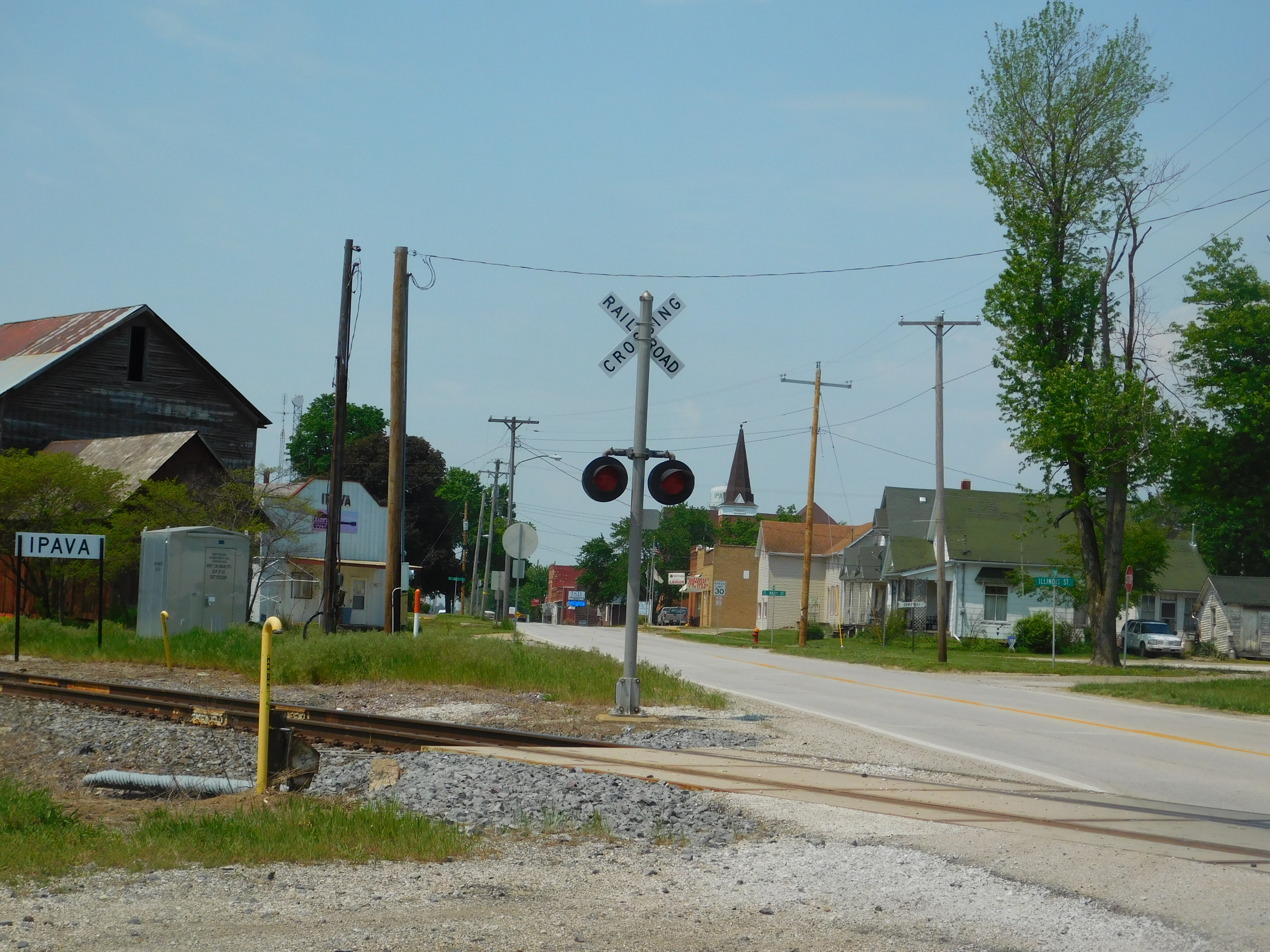
- Ipava along U.S. Route 136

- Location of Ipava in Fulton County, Illinois.

- Location of Illinois in the United States
- Coordinates: 40°21′09″N 90°19′24″W
- Country: United States
- State: Illinois
- County: Fulton
- Township: Pleasant

Area
  - Total: 0.27 sq mi (0.69 km^{2})
  - Land: 0.27 sq mi (0.69 km^{2})
  - Water: 0 sq mi (0.00 km^{2})
- Elevation: 656 ft (200 m)

Population (2020)
  - Total: 447
  - Density: 1,668/sq mi (643.9/km^{2})
- Time zone: UTC-6 (CST)
  - Summer (DST): UTC-5 (CDT)
- ZIP Code(s): 61441
- Area code: 309
- FIPS code: 17-37647
- GNIS ID: 2398272

Ipava is a village in Fulton County, Illinois, United States. The population was 447 at the 2020 census.

== History ==
Ipava was platted in 1846, at the time called Pleasantville. It was renamed to Ipava in 1853 when it was incorporated.

== Geography ==
Ipava is located in southern Fulton County. U.S. Route 136 passes through the village, leading east 17 miles (27 km) to Havana on the Illinois River and west 6 miles (10 km) to Table Grove. Lewistown, the Fulton County seat, is 12 miles (19 km) to the northeast via US 136 and US 24.

According to the 2021 census gazetteer files, Ipava has a total area of 0.27 square miles (0.70 km^{2}), all land.

== Demographics ==
Historical population
Census	Pop.	Note	%±
1860	299		—
1870	488		63.2%
1880	675		38.3%
1890	667		−1.2%
1900	749		12.3%
1910	652		−13.0%
1920	720		10.4%
1930	635		−11.8%
1940	629		−0.9%
1950	667		6.0%
1960	623		−6.6%
1970	608		−2.4%
1980	661		8.7%
1990	483		−26.9%
2000	506		4.8%
2010	470		−7.1%
2020	447		−4.9%
U.S. Decennial Census

As of the 2020 census there were 447 people, 243 households, and 172 families residing in the village. The population density was 1,667.91 inhabitants per square mile (643.98/km^{2}). There were 230 housing units at an average density of 858.21 per square mile (331.36/km^{2}). The racial makeup of the village was 95.97% White, 0.22% African American, 0.22% Native American, 0.00% Asian, 0.00% Pacific Islander, 0.22% from other races, and 3.36% from two or more races. Hispanic or Latino of any race were 0.22% of the population.

There were 243 households, out of which 35.8% had children under the age of 18 living with them, 50.62% were married couples living together, 16.87% had a female householder with no husband present, and 29.22% were non-families. 25.93% of all households were made up of individuals, and 11.93% had someone living alone who was 65 years of age or older. The average household size was 2.69 and the average family size was 2.30.

The village's age distribution consisted of 23.5% under the age of 18, 8.6% from 18 to 24, 23.3% from 25 to 44, 23.1% from 45 to 64, and 21.5% who were 65 years of age or older. The median age was 37.5 years. For every 100 females, there were 105.1 males. For every 100 females age 18 and over, there were 111.4 males.

The median income for a household in the village was $33,958, and the median income for a family was $60,833. Males had a median income of $38,583 versus $23,750 for females. The per capita income for the village was $23,226. About 19.8% of families and 22.0% of the population were below the poverty line, including 39.1% of those under age 18 and 5.8% of those age 65 or over.

== Notable people ==
- Jack Fisk, actor and director, married to actress Sissy Spacek; born to Jack Fisk Sr. and Geraldine Fisk of Ipava on December 19, 1945
- Frank Lovell, politician with the Socialist Workers Party; born in Ipava
