= Lewistown Township, Fulton County, Illinois =

Lewistown Township
- Township
- Location in Fulton County

- Fulton County's location in Illinois
- Coordinates: 40°24′38″N 90°09′33″W
- Country: United States
- State: Illinois
- County: Fulton
- Established: November 6, 1849

Area
  - Total: 35.5 sq mi (92 km^{2})
  - Land: 35.5 sq mi (92 km^{2})
  - Water: 0 sq mi (0 km^{2}) 0%
- Elevation: 594 ft (181 m)

Population (2020)
  - Total: 2,671
  - Density: 75.2/sq mi (29.1/km^{2})
- Time zone: UTC-6 (CST)
  - Summer (DST): UTC-5 (CDT)
- ZIP codes: 61427, 61542
- FIPS code: 17-057-43068

Lewistown Township is one of twenty-six townships in Fulton County, Illinois, USA. As of the 2020 census, its population was 2,671 and it contained 1,425 housing units.

== Geography ==
According to the 2021 census gazetteer files, Lewistown Township has a total area of 35.50 square miles (91.94 km^{2}), all land.

=== Cities, towns, villages ===
- Lewistown

=== Unincorporated towns ===
- Depler Springs

(This list is based on USGS data and may include former settlements.)

=== Cemeteries ===
The township contains these four cemeteries: McNeil, Oak Hill, Saint Marys and Wright.

=== Major highways ===
- US Route 24
- Illinois Route 97
- Illinois Route 100

== Demographics ==
As of the 2020 census there were 2,671 people, 1,149 households, and 775 families residing in the township. The population density was 75.24 inhabitants per square mile (29.05/km^{2}). There were 1,425 housing units at an average density of 40.14 per square mile (15.50/km^{2}). The racial makeup of the township was 95.58% White, 0.34% African American, 0.11% Native American, 0.04% Asian, 0.04% Pacific Islander, 0.86% from other races, and 3.03% from two or more races. Hispanic or Latino of any race were 0.97% of the population.

There were 1,149 households, out of which 28.30% had children under the age of 18 living with them, 54.83% were married couples living together, 6.79% had a female householder with no spouse present, and 32.55% were non-families. 29.70% of all households were made up of individuals, and 12.40% had someone living alone who was 65 years of age or older. The average household size was 2.38 and the average family size was 2.90.

The township's age distribution consisted of 21.0% under the age of 18, 7.0% from 18 to 24, 23.8% from 25 to 44, 29.3% from 45 to 64, and 19.0% who were 65 years of age or older. The median age was 43.6 years. For every 100 females, there were 103.0 males. For every 100 females age 18 and over, there were 98.5 males.

The median income for a household in the township was $62,383, and the median income for a family was $88,266. Males had a median income of $54,091 versus $30,926 for females. The per capita income for the township was $29,564. About 8.8% of families and 15.6% of the population were below the poverty line, including 20.9% of those under age 18 and 9.8% of those age 65 or over.

Historical population
| Census | Pop. | Note | %± |
|---|---|---|---|
| 2000 | 3,149 | | — |
| 2010 | 3,039 | | −3.5% |
| 2020 | 2,671 | | −12.1% |
U.S. Decennial Census

== School districts ==
- Lewistown School District 97

== Political districts ==
- Illinois's 17th congressional district
- State House District 91
- State Senate District 46
