= Woodland Township =

Woodland Township may refer to:

== Illinois ==
- Woodland Township, Carroll County, Illinois
- Woodland Township, Fulton County, Illinois

== Iowa ==
- Woodland Township, Decatur County, Iowa

== Michigan ==
- Woodland Township, Michigan

== Minnesota ==
- Woodland Township, Wright County, Minnesota

== New Jersey ==
- Woodland Township, Burlington County, New Jersey

== Oklahoma ==
- Woodland Township, Logan County, Oklahoma

== South Dakota ==
- Woodland Township, Clark County, South Dakota, in Clark County, South Dakota

== See also ==
- Woodland (disambiguation)
