= Mound House =

Mound House can refer to:

- Mound House, Nevada, an unincorporated town in Lyon County, Nevada
- Mound House (Greene County, Illinois), an archeological site in Greene County, Illinois
- Mound House (Duncan Falls, Ohio), a site on the National Register of Historic Places listings in Muskingum County, Ohio
- Mound House (Fort Myers Beach, Florida), a site on the National Register of Historic Places listings in Lee County, Florida
