= Farmington Township, Fulton County, Illinois =

Farmington Township
- Township
- Location in Fulton County

- Fulton County's location in Illinois
- Coordinates: 40°39′51″N 90°03′18″W
- Country: United States
- State: Illinois
- County: Fulton
- Established: November 6, 1849

Area
  - Total: 35.88 sq mi (92.9 km^{2})
  - Land: 35.69 sq mi (92.4 km^{2})
  - Water: 0.19 sq mi (0.49 km^{2}) 0.54%
- Elevation: 761 ft (232 m)

Population (2020)
  - Total: 3,241
  - Density: 90.81/sq mi (35.06/km^{2})
- Time zone: UTC-6 (CST)
  - Summer (DST): UTC-5 (CDT)
- ZIP codes: 61520, 61531
- FIPS code: 17-057-25544

Farmington Township is one of twenty-six townships in Fulton County, Illinois, USA. As of the 2020 census, its population was 3,241 and it contained 1,484 housing units.

== History ==
Farmington Township is named after Farmington, Connecticut.

== Geography ==
According to the 2021 census gazetteer files, Farmington Township has a total area of 35.88 square miles (92.93 km^{2}), of which 35.69 square miles (92.44 km^{2}) (or 99.46%) is land and 0.19 square miles (0.49 km^{2}) (or 0.54%) is water.

=== Cities, towns, villages ===
- Farmington
- Norris (north half)

=== Unincorporated towns ===
- Forty Acres
- Gilchrist
- Middlegrove

(This list is based on USGS data and may include former settlements.)

=== Cemeteries ===
The township contains these five cemeteries: Coal Creek, Hill, Oak Ridge, Pleasant Hill and Providence Chapel.

=== Major highways ===
- Illinois Route 78
- Illinois Route 116

== Demographics ==
As of the 2020 census there were 3,241 people, 1,284 households, and 804 families residing in the township. The population density was 90.32 inhabitants per square mile (34.87/km^{2}). There were 1,484 housing units at an average density of 41.36 per square mile (15.97/km^{2}). The racial makeup of the township was 94.94% White, 0.19% African American, 0.28% Native American, 0.00% Asian, 0.06% Pacific Islander, 0.52% from other races, and 4.01% from two or more races. Hispanic or Latino of any race were 1.94% of the population.

There were 1,284 households, out of which 33.60% had children under the age of 18 living with them, 48.52% were married couples living together, 8.57% had a female householder with no spouse present, and 37.38% were non-families. 33.60% of all households were made up of individuals, and 18.20% had someone living alone who was 65 years of age or older. The average household size was 2.37 and the average family size was 3.07.

The township's age distribution consisted of 27.5% under the age of 18, 6.7% from 18 to 24, 24.8% from 25 to 44, 22.3% from 45 to 64, and 18.6% who were 65 years of age or older. The median age was 39.8 years. For every 100 females, there were 92.5 males. For every 100 females age 18 and over, there were 86.2 males.

The median income for a household in the township was $57,542, and the median income for a family was $59,667. Males had a median income of $46,172 versus $23,125 for females. The per capita income for the township was $29,810. About 5.1% of families and 7.5% of the population were below the poverty line, including 3.2% of those under age 18 and 6.9% of those age 65 or over.

Historical population
| Census | Pop. | Note | %± |
|---|---|---|---|
| 2000 | 3,425 | | — |
| 2010 | 3,350 | | −2.2% |
| 2020 | 3,241 | | −3.3% |
U.S. Decennial Census

== School districts ==
- Canton Union School District 66
- Farmington Central Community Unit School District 265

== Political districts ==
- Illinois' 17th congressional district
- State House District 91
- State Senate District 46
