= Liverpool Township =

Liverpool Township may refer to the following townships in the United States:

- Liverpool Township, Fulton County, Illinois
- Liverpool Township, Columbiana County, Ohio
- Liverpool Township, Medina County, Ohio
- Liverpool Township, Perry County, Pennsylvania
