= Gilchrist, Illinois =

Gilchrist, Illinois may refer to:

- Gilchrist, Fulton County, Illinois, an unincorporated community in Fulton County
- Gilchrist, Mercer County, Illinois, an unincorporated community in Mercer County
