= Vermont Township, Fulton County, Illinois =

Vermont Township
- Township
- Location in Fulton County

- Fulton County's location in Illinois
- Coordinates: 40°19′10″N 90°23′30″W
- Country: United States
- State: Illinois
- County: Fulton
- Established: November 6, 1849

Area
  - Total: 36.80 sq mi (95.3 km^{2})
  - Land: 36.67 sq mi (95.0 km^{2})
  - Water: 0.13 sq mi (0.34 km^{2}) 0.36%
- Elevation: 633 ft (193 m)

Population (2020)
  - Total: 848
  - Density: 23.1/sq mi (8.93/km^{2})
- Time zone: UTC-6 (CST)
  - Summer (DST): UTC-5 (CDT)
- ZIP codes: 61441, 61482, 61484
- FIPS code: 17–057–77655

Vermont Township is one of twenty-six townships in Fulton County, Illinois, USA. As of the 2020 census, its population was 848 and it contained 411 housing units.

== Geography ==
According to the 2021 census gazetteer files, Vermont Township has a total area of 36.80 square miles (95.31 km^{2}), of which 36.67 square miles (94.97 km^{2}) (or 99.64%) is land and 0.13 square miles (0.34 km^{2}) (or 0.36%) is water.

=== Cities, towns, villages ===
- Table Grove (southeast half)
- Vermont

=== Cemeteries ===
The township contains these seven cemeteries: Bailey, Dobbins, Easley, Fleming, Quaker, Union Chapel and Vermont.

=== Major highways ===
- U.S. Route 136

== Demographics ==
As of the 2020 census there were 848 people, 449 households, and 293 families residing in the township. The population density was 23.04 inhabitants per square mile (8.90/km^{2}). There were 411 housing units at an average density of 11.17 per square mile (4.31/km^{2}). The racial makeup of the township was 95.64% White, 0.12% African American, 0.00% Native American, 0.00% Asian, 0.00% Pacific Islander, 0.94% from other races, and 3.30% from two or more races. Hispanic or Latino of any race were 2.83% of the population.

There were 449 households, out of which 23.80% had children under the age of 18 living with them, 53.67% were married couples living together, 9.80% had a female householder with no spouse present, and 34.74% were non-families. 24.90% of all households were made up of individuals, and 9.80% had someone living alone who was 65 years of age or older. The average household size was 2.20 and the average family size was 2.65.

The township's age distribution consisted of 19.3% under the age of 18, 5.6% from 18 to 24, 21.3% from 25 to 44, 34% from 45 to 64, and 19.8% who were 65 years of age or older. The median age was 49.1 years. For every 100 females, there were 106.0 males. For every 100 females age 18 and over, there were 104.6 males.

The median income for a household in the township was $53,177, and the median income for a family was $56,094. Males had a median income of $44,087 versus $27,800 for females. The per capita income for the township was $26,836. About 8.5% of families and 11.3% of the population were below the poverty line, including 18.8% of those under age 18 and 5.6% of those age 65 or over.

Historical population
| Census | Pop. | Note | %± |
|---|---|---|---|
| 2000 | 1,075 | | — |
| 2010 | 974 | | −9.4% |
| 2020 | 848 | | −12.9% |
U.S. Decennial Census

== School districts ==
- Schuyler-Industry Community Unit School District 5
- V I T Community Unit School District 2

== Political districts ==
- Illinois' 17th congressional district
- State House District 94
- State Senate District 47
