= Avon, Illinois =

- Village
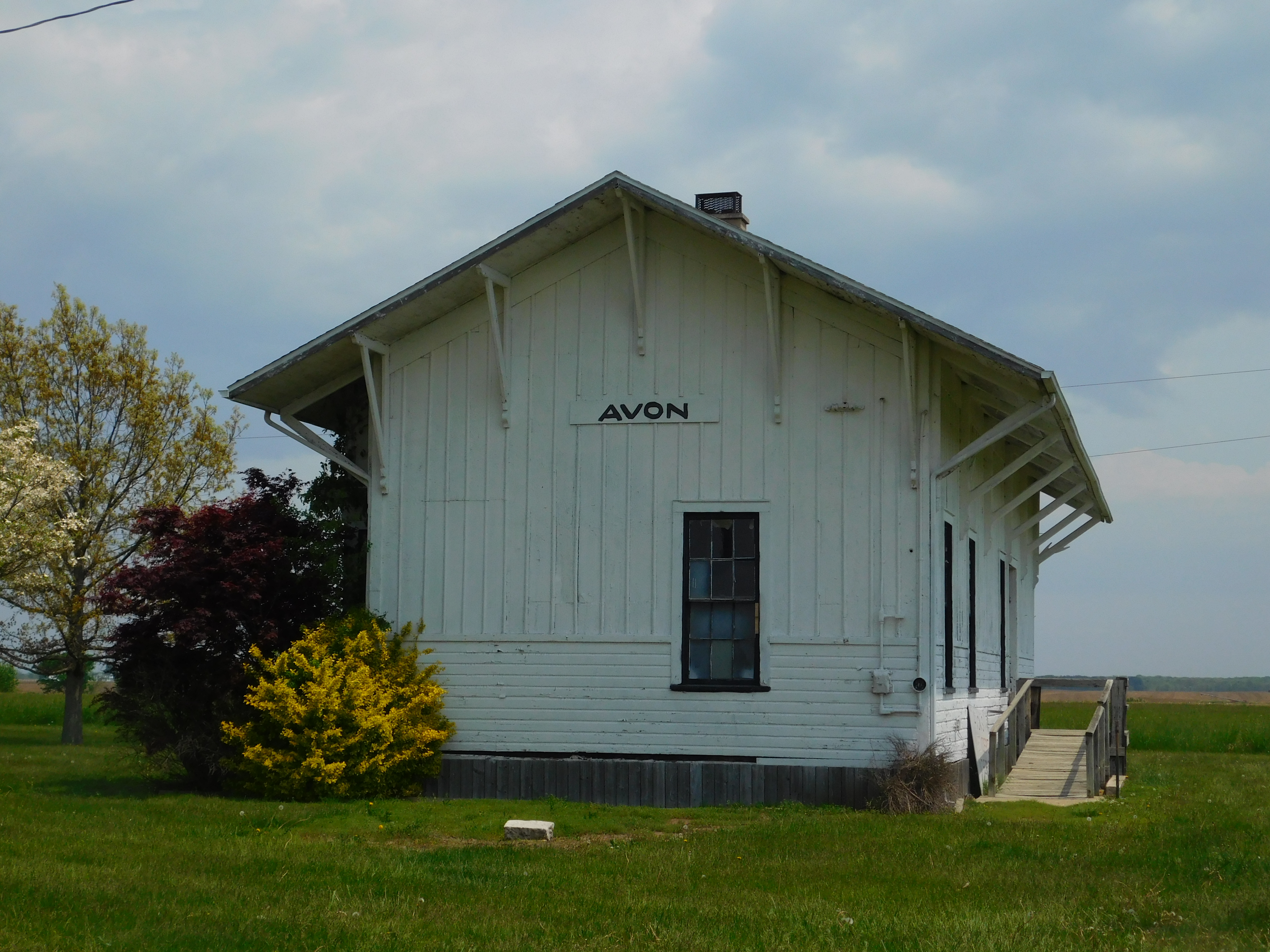
- The former Chicago, Burlington and Quincy Railroad station in Avon, now located in Avon Town Park.

- Location of Avon in Warren County, Illinois.

- Location of Illinois in the United States
- Coordinates: 40°39′43″N 90°26′07″W
- Country: United States
- State: Illinois
- Counties: Fulton, Warren
- Townships: Union, Greenbush

Government
  - Village President: Zach Grace

Area
  - Total: 0.44 sq mi (1.15 km^{2})
  - Land: 0.44 sq mi (1.15 km^{2})
  - Water: 0 sq mi (0.00 km^{2})
- Elevation: 640 ft (200 m)

Population (2020)
  - Total: 704
  - Density: 1,590/sq mi (612/km^{2})
- Time zone: UTC-6 (CST)
  - Summer (DST): UTC-5 (CDT)
- ZIP Code(s): 61415
- Area code: 309-465
- FIPS code: 17-03207
- GNIS ID: 2398013
- Wikimedia Commons: Avon, Illinois

Avon is a village in Fulton County, Illinois, United States. The population was 704 at the 2020 census.

== History ==
Ira Woods and his family settled in Avon in 1835. Avon was named "Woodsville" from 1837 to 1843. In 1843, the town became big enough to ask for a post office. The name was then changed to "Woodstock". On April 4, 1852, the United States Postmaster General gave the town the name of "Avon" to avoid confusion with another community in McHenry County, IL. Avon was once a thriving town, due in part to the railroad industry, by serving as a method of transporting cattle to the slaughterhouses in Chicago and also as a stop between Chicago and Quincy.

== Demographics ==
Historical population
Census	Pop.	Note	%±
1860	594		—
1870	672		13.1%
1880	689		2.5%
1890	692		0.4%
1900	809		16.9%
1910	865		6.9%
1920	877		1.4%
1930	799		−8.9%
1940	803		0.5%
1950	870		8.3%
1960	996		14.5%
1970	1,013		1.7%
1980	1,019		0.6%
1990	957		−6.1%
2000	915		−4.4%
2010	799		−12.7%
2020	704		−11.9%
U.S. Decennial Census

As of the 2020 census there were 704 people, 328 households, and 177 families residing in the village. The population density was 1,585.59 inhabitants per square mile (612.20/km^{2}). There were 371 housing units at an average density of 835.59 per square mile (322.62/km^{2}). The racial makeup of the village was 96.16% White, 0.85% African American, 0.28% Native American, 0.00% Asian, 0.00% Pacific Islander, 0.43% from other races, and 2.27% from two or more races. Hispanic or Latino of any race were 1.14% of the population.

There were 328 households, out of which 31.7% had children under the age of 18 living with them, 30.49% were married couples living together, 7.62% had a female householder with no husband present, and 46.04% were non-families. 43.90% of all households were made up of individuals, and 18.29% had someone living alone who was 65 years of age or older. The average household size was 2.74 and the average family size was 2.10.

The village's age distribution consisted of 24.8% under the age of 18, 3.8% from 18 to 24, 24.9% from 25 to 44, 28% from 45 to 64, and 18.6% who were 65 years of age or older. The median age was 43.6 years. For every 100 females, there were 113.0 males. For every 100 females age 18 and over, there were 104.3 males.

The median income for a household in the village was $35,833, and the median income for a family was $46,250. Males had a median income of $30,625 versus $26,635 for females. The per capita income for the village was $22,257. About 26.6% of families and 22.5% of the population were below the poverty line, including 44.8% of those under age 18 and 7.0% of those age 65 or over.

== Geography ==
Avon is located in northwestern Fulton County at 40°39′44″N 90°26′8″W (40.662254, -90.435485). A small portion of the village extends west into Warren County. Illinois Route 41 passes through the village, leading north 21 miles (34 km) to Galesburg and southwest 10 miles (16 km) to Bushnell.

According to the 2021 census gazetteer files, Avon has a total area of 0.44 square miles (1.14 km^{2}), all land.

=== Climate ===
Climate data for Avon, Illinois, 1991–2020 normals, extremes 2000–present
Month	Jan	Feb	Mar	Apr	May	Jun	Jul	Aug	Sep	Oct	Nov	Dec	Year
Record high °F (°C)	63 (17)	73 (23)	81 (27)	86 (30)	97 (36)	98 (37)	102 (39)	96 (36)	99 (37)	89 (32)	77 (25)	72 (22)	102 (39)
Mean daily maximum °F (°C)	30.8 (−0.7)	35.5 (1.9)	48.4 (9.1)	61.8 (16.6)	72.3 (22.4)	80.5 (26.9)	83.7 (28.7)	82.3 (27.9)	76.8 (24.9)	64.2 (17.9)	49.4 (9.7)	36.4 (2.4)	60.2 (15.6)
Daily mean °F (°C)	21.9 (−5.6)	26.1 (−3.3)	37.4 (3.0)	49.4 (9.7)	60.7 (15.9)	69.8 (21.0)	73.0 (22.8)	71.1 (21.7)	63.9 (17.7)	52.0 (11.1)	39.0 (3.9)	28.0 (−2.2)	49.4 (9.6)
Mean daily minimum °F (°C)	13.0 (−10.6)	16.6 (−8.6)	26.3 (−3.2)	37.0 (2.8)	49.1 (9.5)	59.0 (15.0)	62.3 (16.8)	59.8 (15.4)	51.0 (10.6)	39.8 (4.3)	28.5 (−1.9)	19.5 (−6.9)	38.5 (3.6)
Record low °F (°C)	−26 (−32)	−14 (−26)	−4 (−20)	−1 (−18)	26 (−3)	44 (7)	48 (9)	43 (6)	31 (−1)	20 (−7)	2 (−17)	−12 (−24)	−26 (−32)
Average precipitation inches (mm)	1.83 (46)	1.84 (47)	2.38 (60)	3.62 (92)	4.95 (126)	4.38 (111)	4.23 (107)	3.67 (93)	3.65 (93)	2.85 (72)	2.37 (60)	1.86 (47)	37.63 (954)
Average snowfall inches (cm)	7.4 (19)	6.0 (15)	2.7 (6.9)	1.1 (2.8)	0.0 (0.0)	0.0 (0.0)	0.0 (0.0)	0.0 (0.0)	0.0 (0.0)	0.0 (0.0)	1.0 (2.5)	5.8 (15)	24.0 (61)
Average precipitation days (≥ 0.01 in)	7.0	6.6	7.7	9.5	11.0	8.8	8.1	7.6	6.6	7.6	6.8	6.7	94.0
Average snowy days (≥ 0.1 in)	3.8	3.5	1.4	0.3	0.0	0.0	0.0	0.0	0.0	0.0	0.5	2.8	12.3
Source 1: NOAA
Source 2: National Weather Service

== Education ==
It is in the Abingdon-Avon Community Unit School District 276.

== Notable people ==
- Ken Carpenter, radio and TV announcer
