= Havana Hopewell culture =

Indigenous American culture

Approximate Geographic Extent of Havana Hopewell

The Havana Hopewell culture were a Hopewellian people who lived in the Illinois River and Mississippi River valleys in Iowa, Illinois, and Missouri from 200 BCE to 400 CE.

== Hopewell Interaction Sphere ==
The Hopewell Exchange system began in the Ohio and Illinois River Valleys around 300 BCE. The culture is referred to more as a system of interaction among a variety of societies than as a single society or culture. The central Illinois River Valley was home to one particular complex, the Havana Hopewell culture. Havana Hopewell sites have been found in Illinois, northwest Indiana, southwest Michigan, southern Wisconsin, and Minnesota and northeast Iowa. Hopewell trading networks were quite extensive, with obsidian from the Yellowstone area, copper from Lake Superior, and shells from the Gulf Coast.

== Havana Hopewell sites ==
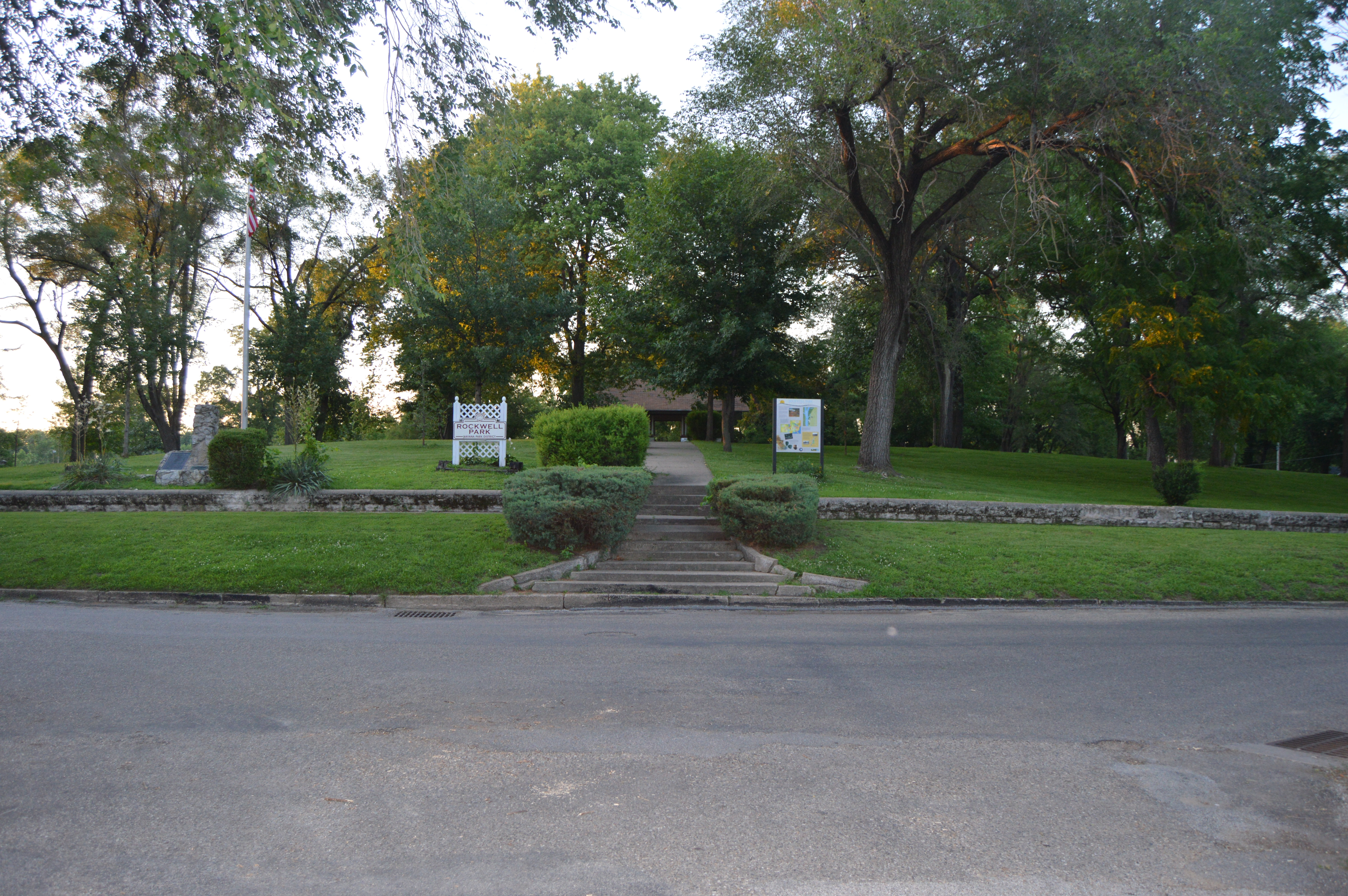
Rockwell Mound, a major site at Havana

=== Toolesboro Mound Group ===
The Toolesboro Mound Group in Louisa County, Iowa included a large octagonal earthen enclosure that covered several acres; earthworks of this style are reminiscent of the monumental construction seen in Chillicothe and Newark, Ohio. It also has a group of seven burial mounds on a bluff overlooking the Iowa River near where it joins the Mississippi River. The conical mounds were constructed between 100 BCE and 200 CE. At one time, there may have been as many as twelve mounds. Mound 2, the largest remaining, measures 100 feet in diameter and 8 feet in height. This mound was possibly the largest Hopewell mound in Iowa.

=== Ogden-Fettie Site ===
The Ogden-Fettie Site is a Havana-Hopewell settlement site and mound complex near Lewistown, Illinois in Fulton County, Illinois. It consists of thirty-five mounds arranged in a crescent-shaped enclosure.

== See also ==
- Albany Mounds State Historic Site
- Mound House (Greene County, Illinois)
- Naples Mound 8
- Rockwell Mound
- Sinnissippi Mounds
- Hopewell tradition
- List of Hopewell sites
