= Liverpool Township, Fulton County, Illinois =

Liverpool Township
- Township
- Location in Fulton County

- Fulton County's location in Illinois
- Coordinates: 40°24′45″N 90°02′08″W
- Country: United States
- State: Illinois
- County: Fulton
- Established: November 6, 1849

Area
  - Total: 42.08 sq mi (109.0 km^{2})
  - Land: 40.26 sq mi (104.3 km^{2})
  - Water: 1.83 sq mi (4.7 km^{2}) 4.35%
- Elevation: 564 ft (172 m)

Population (2020)
  - Total: 556
  - Density: 13.8/sq mi (5.33/km^{2})
- Time zone: UTC-6 (CST)
  - Summer (DST): UTC-5 (CDT)
- ZIP codes: 61520, 61542, 61543
- FIPS code: 17-057-44134

Liverpool Township is one of twenty-six townships in Fulton County, Illinois, USA. As of the 2020 census, its population was 556 and it contained 282 housing units.

== Geography ==
According to the 2021 census gazetteer files, Liverpool Township has a total area of 42.08 square miles (108.99 km^{2}), of which 40.26 square miles (104.27 km^{2}) (or 95.65%) is land and 1.83 square miles (4.74 km^{2}) (or 4.35%) is water.

=== Cities, towns, villages ===
- Liverpool

=== Unincorporated towns ===
- Little America
- Maples Mill

(This list is based on USGS data and may include former settlements.)

=== Extinct towns ===
- Keeler
- Salem
- Pritchard

=== Cemeteries ===
The township contains these four cemeteries: Liverpool, Mount Pleasant, Pollitt and Salem.

=== Major highways ===
- US Route 24
- Illinois Route 78
- Illinois Route 97

=== Lakes ===
- Beebe Lake
- Goose Lake
- Lost Lake

== Demographics ==
As of the 2020 census there were 556 people, 276 households, and 166 families residing in the township. The population density was 13.21 inhabitants per square mile (5.10/km^{2}). There were 282 housing units at an average density of 6.70 per square mile (2.59/km^{2}). The racial makeup of the township was 96.58% White, 0.54% African American, 0.36% Native American, 0.00% Asian, 0.00% Pacific Islander, 0.18% from other races, and 2.34% from two or more races. Hispanic or Latino of any race were 0.54% of the population.

There were 276 households, out of which 18.50% had children under the age of 18 living with them, 51.81% were married couples living together, 3.26% had a female householder with no spouse present, and 39.86% were non-families. 34.10% of all households were made up of individuals, and 11.60% had someone living alone who was 65 years of age or older. The average household size was 2.13 and the average family size was 2.75.

The township's age distribution consisted of 20.1% under the age of 18, 0.3% from 18 to 24, 18.3% from 25 to 44, 42.1% from 45 to 64, and 19.1% who were 65 years of age or older. The median age was 52.9 years. For every 100 females, there were 153.0 males. For every 100 females age 18 and over, there were 149.5 males.

The median income for a household in the township was $50,694, and the median income for a family was $61,600. Males had a median income of $45,150 versus $20,726 for females. The per capita income for the township was $24,274. About 6.0% of families and 9.6% of the population were below the poverty line, including 0.0% of those under age 18 and 8.9% of those age 65 or over.

Historical population
Census	Pop.	Note	%±
2000	691		—
2010	544		−21.3%
2020	556		2.2%
U.S. Decennial Census

== School districts ==
- Canton Union School District 66
- Lewistown School District 97

== Political districts ==
- Illinois' 17th congressional district
- State House District 91
- State Senate District 46
