= Harris Township, Fulton County, Illinois =

Harris Township
- Township
- Location in Fulton County

- Fulton County's location in Illinois
- Coordinates: 40°29′59″N 90°23′32″W
- Country: United States
- State: Illinois
- County: Fulton
- Established: November 6, 1849

Area
  - Total: 34.33 sq mi (88.9 km^{2})
  - Land: 34.17 sq mi (88.5 km^{2})
  - Water: 0.16 sq mi (0.41 km^{2}) 0.45%
- Elevation: 643 ft (196 m)

Population (2020)
  - Total: 312
  - Density: 9.13/sq mi (3.53/km^{2})
- Time zone: UTC-6 (CST)
  - Summer (DST): UTC-5 (CDT)
- ZIP codes: 61459, 61477, 61482
- FIPS code: 17-057-33110

Harris Township is one of twenty-six townships in Fulton County, Illinois, USA. As of the 2020 census, its population was 312 and it contained 155 housing units.

== Geography ==
According to the 2021 census gazetteer files, Harris Township has a total area of 34.33 square miles (88.91 km^{2}), of which 34.17 square miles (88.50 km^{2}) (or 99.55%) is land and 0.16 square miles (0.41 km^{2}) (or 0.45%) is water.

=== Cities, towns, villages ===
- Marietta
- * Seville (Only a number of houses exist)
- Vanapolis (no longer exists)
- Leaman
- Buckwheat
- Point Pleasant
- Williams
- Shoofly

=== Cemeteries ===
The township contains these two cemeteries: Marietta and Point Pleasant.

=== Major highways ===
- Illinois Route 95

== Demographics ==
As of the 2020 census there were 312 people, 124 households, and 104 families residing in the township. The population density was 9.09 inhabitants per square mile (3.51/km^{2}). There were 155 housing units at an average density of 4.52 per square mile (1.75/km^{2}). The racial makeup of the township was 96.79% White, 0.00% African American, 0.32% Native American, 0.32% Asian, 0.00% Pacific Islander, 0.00% from other races, and 2.56% from two or more races. Hispanic or Latino of any race were 0.64% of the population.

There were 124 households, out of which 34.70% had children under the age of 18 living with them, 79.84% were married couples living together, 4.03% had a female householder with no spouse present, and 16.13% were non-families. 9.70% of all households were made up of individuals, and 4.00% had someone living alone who was 65 years of age or older. The average household size was 2.85 and the average family size was 3.12.

The township's age distribution consisted of 21.5% under the age of 18, 8.2% from 18 to 24, 19.6% from 25 to 44, 37.4% from 45 to 64, and 13.3% who were 65 years of age or older. The median age was 45.3 years. For every 100 females, there were 140.1 males. For every 100 females age 18 and over, there were 111.5 males.

The median income for a household in the township was $79,167, and the median income for a family was $79,722. Males had a median income of $54,293 versus $35,156 for females. The per capita income for the township was $33,032. About 1.0% of families and 0.8% of the population were below the poverty line, including 0.0% of those under age 18 and 4.3% of those age 65 or over.

Historical population
Census	Pop.	Note	%±
2000	427		—
2010	368		−13.8%
2020	312		−15.2%
U.S. Decennial Census

== School districts ==
- Bushnell Prairie City Community Unit School District 170
- Community Unit School District 3 Fulton City
- V I T Community Unit School District 2

== Political districts ==
- Illinois's 17th congressional district
- State House District 94
- State Senate District 47
