= Union Township, Fulton County, Illinois =

Union Township
- Township
- Location in Fulton County

- Fulton County's location in Illinois
- Coordinates: 40°39′51″N 90°23′45″W
- Country: United States
- State: Illinois
- County: Fulton

Area
  - Total: 36.64 sq mi (94.9 km^{2})
  - Land: 36.60 sq mi (94.8 km^{2})
  - Water: 0.04 sq mi (0.10 km^{2}) 0.10%
- Elevation: 633 ft (193 m)

Population (2020)
  - Total: 900
  - Density: 25/sq mi (9.5/km^{2})
- Time zone: UTC-6 (CST)
  - Summer (DST): UTC-5 (CDT)
- ZIP codes: 61415, 61431
- FIPS code: 17-057-76667

Union Township is one of twenty-six townships in Fulton County, Illinois, USA. As of the 2020 census, its population was 900 and it contained 453 housing units.

== Geography ==
According to the 2021 census gazetteer files, Union Township has a total area of 36.64 square miles (94.90 km^{2}), of which 36.60 square miles (94.79 km^{2}) (or 99.90%) is land and 0.04 square miles (0.10 km^{2}) (or 0.10%) is water.

=== Cities, towns, villages ===
- Avon

=== Extinct towns ===
- Pleasant Ridge
- Troy

(These are listed as "historical" by the USGS.)

=== Cemeteries ===
The township contains these four cemeteries: Avon, Babbitt, Flake and Saint Augustine.

=== Major highways ===
- Illinois Route 41

=== Lakes ===
- Avondale Lake

== Demographics ==
As of the 2020 census there were 900 people, 416 households, and 227 families residing in the township. The population density was 24.56 inhabitants per square mile (9.48/km^{2}). There were 453 housing units at an average density of 12.36 per square mile (4.77/km^{2}). The racial makeup of the township was 97.00% White, 0.67% African American, 0.22% Native American, 0.00% Asian, 0.00% Pacific Islander, 0.33% from other races, and 1.78% from two or more races. Hispanic or Latino of any race were 1.56% of the population.

There were 416 households, out of which 34.60% had children under the age of 18 living with them, 34.86% were married couples living together, 6.01% had a female householder with no spouse present, and 45.43% were non-families. 39.20% of all households were made up of individuals, and 17.50% had someone living alone who was 65 years of age or older. The average household size was 2.53 and the average family size was 3.36.

The township's age distribution consisted of 23.8% under the age of 18, 9.8% from 18 to 24, 23.4% from 25 to 44, 22.2% from 45 to 64, and 20.7% who were 65 years of age or older. The median age was 41.4 years. For every 100 females, there were 108.9 males. For every 100 females age 18 and over, there were 90.7 males.

The median income for a household in the township was $44,219, and the median income for a family was $59,625. Males had a median income of $25,865 versus $22,359 for females. The per capita income for the township was $21,393. About 20.7% of families and 15.3% of the population were below the poverty line, including 30.3% of those under age 18 and 4.1% of those age 65 or over.

Historical population
Census	Pop.	Note	%±
2000	1,154		—
2010	1,008		−12.7%
2020	900		−10.7%
U.S. Decennial Census

== School districts ==
- Avon Community Unit School District 176
- Spoon River Valley Community Unit School District 4

== Political districts ==
- Illinois' 17th congressional district
- State House District 94
- State Senate District 47
