= Astoria Township, Fulton County, Illinois =

Astoria Township
- Township
- Location in Fulton County

- Fulton County's location in Illinois
- Coordinates: 40°13′53″N 90°23′58″W
- Country: United States
- State: Illinois
- County: Fulton
- Established: November 6, 1849

Area
  - Total: 36.62 sq mi (94.8 km^{2})
  - Land: 36.19 sq mi (93.7 km^{2})
  - Water: 0.43 sq mi (1.1 km^{2}) 1.17%
- Elevation: 679 ft (207 m)

Population (2020)
  - Total: 1,248
  - Density: 34.48/sq mi (13.31/km^{2})
- Time zone: UTC-6 (CST)
  - Summer (DST): UTC-5 (CDT)
- ZIP codes: 61484, 61501
- FIPS code: 17-057-02648

Astoria Township is one of twenty-six townships in Fulton County, Illinois, USA. As of the 2020 census, its population was 1,248 and it contained 629 housing units.

== Geography ==
According to the 2021 census gazetteer files, Astoria Township has a total area of 36.62 square miles (94.85 km^{2}), of which 36.19 square miles (93.73 km^{2}) (or 98.83%) is land and 0.43 square miles (1.11 km^{2}) (or 1.17%) is water.

=== Cities, towns, villages ===
- Astoria
- Washington (no longer exists due to another town in the state with the name). The village contained 48 lots. It was laid out in 1836 & it had a small general store, a few cabins, blacksmith shop and a school house nearby which was also used to hold church services. The village never grew & ceased to exist.
- Vienna was laid out by Zach Gilbert, Benjamin Clark & a Mr Bacon on June 9, 1837. Due to there being another town in the state with this name it was changed to Astoria.

=== Cemeteries ===
The township contains these five cemeteries: Astoria, Oak Grove, Salem, South Fulton and Union Chapel.

=== Major highways ===
- US Route 24

=== Airports and landing strips ===
- Campbell Landing Strip

=== Lakes ===
- Emmanuel Lake

== Demographics ==
As of the 2020 census there were 1,248 people, 668 households, and 367 families residing in the township. The population density was 34.08 inhabitants per square mile (13.16/km^{2}). There were 629 housing units at an average density of 17.18 units per square mile (6.63 units/km^{2}). The racial makeup of the township was 97.68% White, 0.08% African American, 0.08% Native American, 0.00% Asian, 0.00% Pacific Islander, 0.40% from other races, and 1.76% from two or more races. Hispanic or Latino of any race were 1.68% of the population.

There were 668 households, out of which 34.00% had children under the age of 18 living with them, 32.04% were married couples living together, 17.37% had a female householder with no spouse present, and 45.06% were non-families. 33.80% of all households were made up of individuals, and 9.90% had someone living alone who was 65 years of age or older. The average household size was 2.17 and the average family size was 2.92.

The township's age distribution consisted of 28.6% under the age of 18, 8.6% from 18 to 24, 26.4% from 25 to 44, 23.1% from 45 to 64, and 13.4% who were 65 years of age or older. The median age was 33.4 years. For every 100 females, there were 101.7 males. For every 100 females age 18 and over, there were 83.2 males.

The median income for a household in the township was $39,091, and the median income for a family was $50,282. Males had a median income of $29,914 versus $21,364 for females. The per capita income for the township was $21,338. About 15.3% of families and 15.8% of the population were below the poverty line, including 19.5% of those under age 18 and 11.3% of those age 65 or over.

Historical population
Census	Pop.	Note	%±
2000	1,566		—
2010	1,464		−6.5%
2020	1,248		−14.8%
U.S. Decennial Census

== School districts ==
- Astoria Community Unit School District 1
- V I T Community Unit School District 2

== Political districts ==
- Illinois' 17th congressional district
- State House District 94
- State Senate District 47
