= Ogden-Fettie Site =

Archaeological site in Illinois, United States

- U.S. National Register of Historic Places
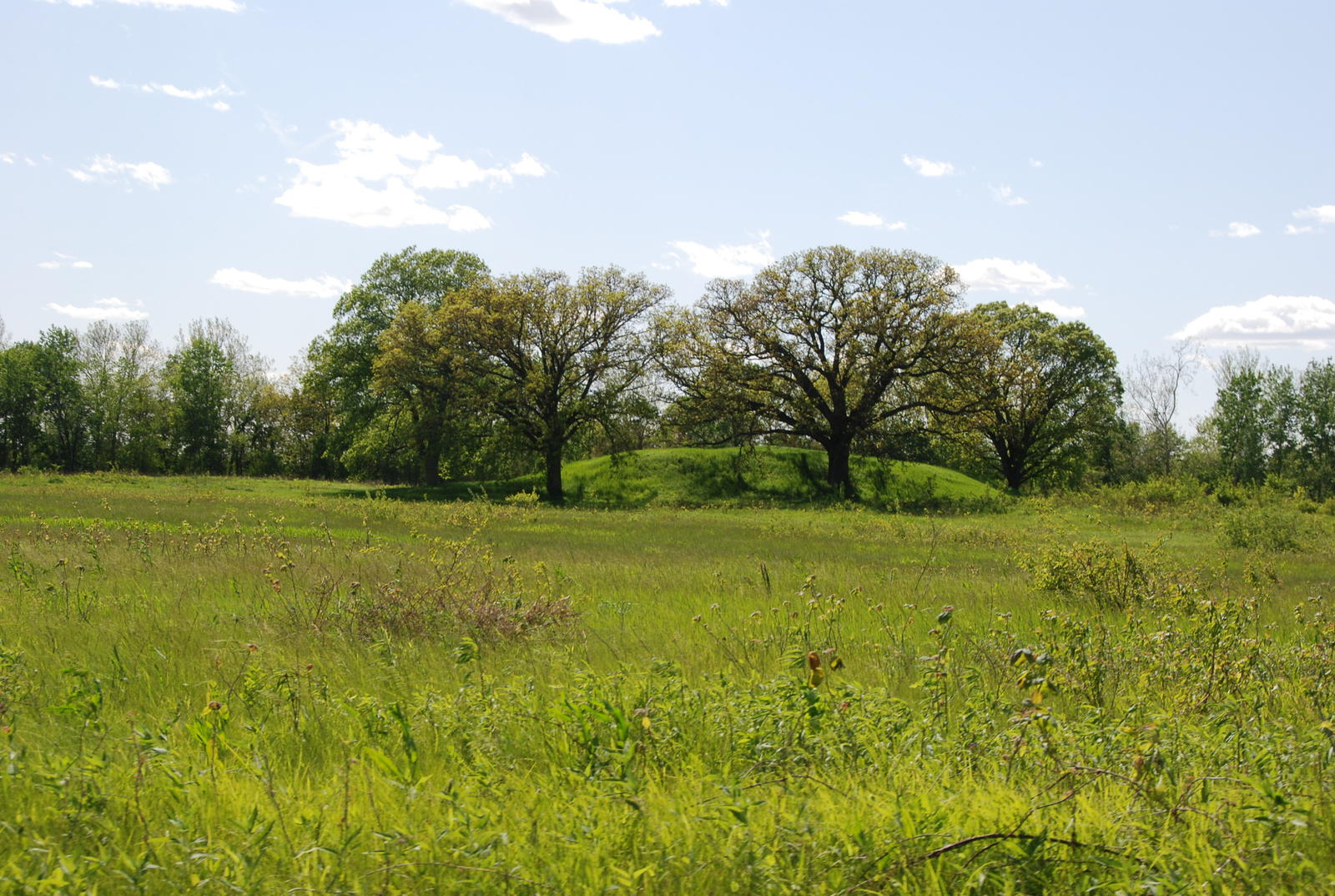

- Location within Illinois Location within the United States
- Nearest city: Lewistown, Illinois
- Coordinates: 40°20′27″N 90°7′6″W
- Area: 200 acres (81 ha)
- NRHP reference No.: 72000458
- Added to NRHP: July 31, 1972

The Ogden-Fettie Site is a prehistoric mound site located south of Lewistown in Fulton County, Illinois. The site was built during the Woodland period and is associated with the Havana Hopewell culture; it dates from roughly 100 B.C. to 400 A.D. The site consists of thirty-five mounds arranged in a crescent-shaped enclosure; the principal mound, located near the center, is 15 feet (4.6 m) high. A village site is located near the principal mound; it and four of the smaller mounds form a pentagonal-shaped enclosure. While such enclosures were common among the Ohio Hopewell, the Ogden-Fettie Site has the only known one west of Ohio.

The site was added to the National Register of Historic Places on July 31, 1972.
