= Pleasant Township, Fulton County, Illinois =

Pleasant Township
- Township
- Location in Fulton County

- Fulton County's location in Illinois
- Coordinates: 40°19′07″N 90°16′29″W
- Country: United States
- State: Illinois
- County: Fulton

Area
  - Total: 37.20 sq mi (96.3 km^{2})
  - Land: 37.19 sq mi (96.3 km^{2})
  - Water: 0.02 sq mi (0.052 km^{2}) 0.04%
- Elevation: 541 ft (165 m)

Population (2020)
  - Total: 706
  - Density: 19.0/sq mi (7.33/km^{2})
- Time zone: UTC-6 (CST)
  - Summer (DST): UTC-5 (CDT)
- ZIP codes: 61441, 61501, 61542
- FIPS code: 17-057-60430

Pleasant Township is one of twenty-six townships in Fulton County, Illinois, USA. As of the 2020 census, its population was 706 and it contained 359 housing units.

== Geography ==
According to the 2021 census gazetteer files, Pleasant Township has a total area of 37.20 square miles (96.35 km^{2}), of which 37.19 square miles (96.32 km^{2}) (or 99.96%) is land and 0.02 square miles (0.05 km^{2}) (or 0.04%) is water.

=== Cities, towns, villages ===
- Ipava

=== Unincorporated towns ===
- Howard

(This list is based on USGS data and may include former settlements.)

=== Cemeteries ===
The township contains these seven cemeteries: Danner, Howard, Ipava, Lacey, Montgomery, Old Ipava and Smith.

=== Major highways ===
- U.S. Route 24
- U.S. Route 136

== Demographics ==
As of the 2020 census there were 706 people, 415 households, and 292 families residing in the township. The population density was 18.98 inhabitants per square mile (7.33/km^{2}). There were 359 housing units at an average density of 9.65 per square mile (3.73/km^{2}). The racial makeup of the township was 95.61% White, 0.14% African American, 0.28% Native American, 0.00% Asian, 0.00% Pacific Islander, 0.71% from other races, and 3.26% from two or more races. Hispanic or Latino of any race were 0.71% of the population.

There were 415 households, out of which 34.90% had children under the age of 18 living with them, 53.49% were married couples living together, 14.94% had a female householder with no spouse present, and 29.64% were non-families. 27.70% of all households were made up of individuals, and 9.20% had someone living alone who was 65 years of age or older. The average household size was 2.34 and the average family size was 2.82.

The township's age distribution consisted of 26.6% under the age of 18, 7.2% from 18 to 24, 20.6% from 25 to 44, 25.5% from 45 to 64, and 20.2% who were 65 years of age or older. The median age was 42.8 years. For every 100 females, there were 120.7 males. For every 100 females age 18 and over, there were 117.4 males.

The median income for a household in the township was $53,563, and the median income for a family was $75,086. Males had a median income of $39,917 versus $31,522 for females. The per capita income for the township was $26,338. About 13.0% of families and 18.0% of the population were below the poverty line, including 19.6% of those under age 18 and 8.2% of those age 65 or over.

Historical population
Census	Pop.	Note	%±
2000	750		—
2010	744		−0.8%
2020	706		−5.1%
U.S. Decennial Census

== School districts ==
- Astoria Community Unit School District 1
- V I T Community Unit School District 2

== Political districts ==
- Illinois's 17th congressional district
- State House District 94
- State Senate District 47
