= Marietta, Illinois =

- Village
- Location of Marietta in Fulton County, Illinois.

- Location of Illinois in the United States
- Coordinates: 40°30′05″N 90°23′35″W
- Country: United States
- State: Illinois
- County: Fulton
- Township: Harris

Area
  - Total: 0.27 sq mi (0.71 km^{2})
  - Land: 0.27 sq mi (0.71 km^{2})
  - Water: 0 sq mi (0.00 km^{2})
- Elevation: 637 ft (194 m)

Population (2020)
  - Total: 101
  - Density: 369.4/sq mi (142.64/km^{2})
- Time zone: UTC-6 (CST)
  - Summer (DST): UTC-5 (CDT)
- ZIP Code(s): 61459
- Area code: 309
- FIPS code: 17-46825
- GNIS ID: 2399255
- Wikimedia Commons: Marietta, Illinois

Marietta is a village in Fulton County, Illinois, United States. The population was 101 at the 2020 census.

== Geography ==
Marietta is located in western Fulton County along Illinois Route 95, which leads east 11 miles (18 km) to Cuba and west 6 miles (9.7 km) to Illinois Route 41 at a point 5 miles (8 km) south of Bushnell.

According to the 2010 census, Marietta has a total area of 0.27 square miles (0.70 km^{2}), all land.

== Demographics ==
Historical population
Census	Pop.	Note	%±
1850	442		—
1860	188		−57.5%
1870	110		−41.5%
1880	118		7.3%
1910	329		—
1920	512		55.6%
1930	202		−60.5%
1940	193		−4.5%
1950	178		−7.8%
1960	201		12.9%
1970	169		−15.9%
1980	192		13.6%
1990	142		−26.0%
2000	150		5.6%
2010	112		−25.3%
2020	101		−9.8%
U.S. Decennial Census

As of the 2020 census there were 101 people, 33 households, and 21 families residing in the village. The population density was 369.96 inhabitants per square mile (142.84/km^{2}). There were 49 housing units at an average density of 179.49 per square mile (69.30/km^{2}). The racial makeup of the village was 94.06% White, 0.00% African American, 0.99% Native American, 0.00% Asian, 0.00% Pacific Islander, 0.00% from other races, and 4.95% from two or more races. Hispanic or Latino of any race were 0.00% of the population.

There were 33 households, out of which 18.2% had children under the age of 18 living with them, 48.48% were married couples living together, 15.15% had a female householder with no husband present, and 36.36% were non-families. 36.36% of all households were made up of individuals, and 15.15% had someone living alone who was 65 years of age or older. The average household size was 2.33 and the average family size was 1.85.

The village's age distribution consisted of 14.8% under the age of 18, 4.9% from 18 to 24, 11.4% from 25 to 44, 31.1% from 45 to 64, and 37.7% who were 65 years of age or older. The median age was 62.4 years. For every 100 females, there were 96.8 males. For every 100 females age 18 and over, there were 79.3 males.

The median income for a household in the village was $48,750, and the median income for a family was $55,313. Males had a median income of $50,625 versus $41,250 for females. The per capita income for the village was $25,644. About 4.8% of families and 4.9% of the population were below the poverty line, including none of those under age 18 and 8.7% of those age 65 or over.
