= Beaty, Illinois =

- Unincorporated community
- Location within Illinois Location within the United States
- Coordinates: 40°16′30″N 90°14′45″W
- Country: United States
- State: Illinois
- County: Fulton
- Elevation: 620 ft (190 m)
- Time zone: UTC-6 (Central (CST))
  - Summer (DST): UTC-5 (CDT)
- Area code: 309
- GNIS feature ID: 422445

Beaty is an unincorporated community in Fulton County, Illinois, United States. The community is located on U.S. Route 24, northeast of Astoria.
