= Farmers Township, Fulton County, Illinois =

Farmers Township
- Township
- Location in Fulton County

- Fulton County's location in Illinois
- Coordinates: 40°24′47″N 90°23′52″W
- Country: United States
- State: Illinois
- County: Fulton
- Established: November 6, 1849

Area
  - Total: 36.06 sq mi (93.4 km^{2})
  - Land: 36.01 sq mi (93.3 km^{2})
  - Water: 0.05 sq mi (0.13 km^{2}) 0.15%
- Elevation: 650 ft (198 m)

Population (2020)
  - Total: 370
  - Density: 10/sq mi (4.0/km^{2})
- Time zone: UTC-6 (CST)
  - Summer (DST): UTC-5 (CDT)
- ZIP codes: 61441, 61459, 61482
- FIPS code: 17-057-25427

Farmers Township is one of twenty-six townships in Fulton County, Illinois, USA. As of the 2020 census, its population was 370 and it contained 180 housing units.

== Geography ==
According to the 2021 census gazetteer files, Farmers Township has a total area of 36.06 square miles (93.39 km^{2}), of which 36.01 square miles (93.27 km^{2}) (or 99.85%) is land and 0.05 square miles (0.13 km^{2}) (or 0.15%) is water.

=== Cities, towns, villages ===
- Table Grove (northeast half)

=== Cemeteries ===
The township contains these four cemeteries: Barker, Laurel Hill, Temple and Zoll.

=== Major highways ===
- US Route 136

== Demographics ==
As of the 2020 census there were 370 people, 162 households, and 97 families residing in the township. The population density was 10.26 inhabitants per square mile (3.96/km^{2}). There were 180 housing units at an average density of 4.99 per square mile (1.93/km^{2}). The racial makeup of the township was 97.57% White, 0.27% African American, 0.54% Native American, 0.00% Asian, 0.00% Pacific Islander, 0.54% from other races, and 1.08% from two or more races. Hispanic or Latino of any race were 0.27% of the population.

There were 162 households, out of which 37.00% had children under the age of 18 living with them, 50.00% were married couples living together, 8.64% had a female householder with no spouse present, and 40.12% were non-families. 34.60% of all households were made up of individuals, and 20.40% had someone living alone who was 65 years of age or older. The average household size was 2.20 and the average family size was 2.82.

The township's age distribution consisted of 25.5% under the age of 18, 9.8% from 18 to 24, 30.6% from 25 to 44, 21% from 45 to 64, and 13.2% who were 65 years of age or older. The median age was 33.5 years. For every 100 females, there were 106.4 males. For every 100 females age 18 and over, there were 103.1 males.

The median income for a household in the township was $51,250, and the median income for a family was $66,458. Males had a median income of $46,563 versus $20,893 for females. The per capita income for the township was $26,646. About 11.3% of families and 17.6% of the population were below the poverty line, including 15.4% of those under age 18 and 14.9% of those age 65 or over.

Historical population
Census	Pop.	Note	%±
2000	366		—
2010	397		8.5%
2020	370		−6.8%
U.S. Decennial Census

== School districts ==
- V I T Community Unit School District 2

== Political districts ==
- Illinois' 17th congressional district
- State House District 94
- State Senate District 47
