= Orion Township, Fulton County, Illinois =

Township in the United States

Orion Township
- Township
- Location in Fulton County

- Fulton County's location in Illinois
- Coordinates: 40°35′03″N 89°55′53″W
- Country: United States
- State: Illinois
- County: Fulton
- Established: November 6, 1849

Area
  - Total: 36.80 sq mi (95.3 km^{2})
  - Land: 36.44 sq mi (94.4 km^{2})
  - Water: 0.37 sq mi (0.96 km^{2}) 0.99%
- Elevation: 630 ft (192 m)

Population (2020)
  - Total: 1,145
  - Density: 31.42/sq mi (12.13/km^{2})
- Time zone: UTC-6 (CST)
  - Summer (DST): UTC-5 (CDT)
- ZIP codes: 61520, 61533
- FIPS code: 17-057-56588

Orion Township is one of twenty-six townships in Fulton County, Illinois, USA. As of the 2020 census, its population was 1,145 and it contained 513 housing units.

== Geography ==
According to the 2021 census gazetteer files, Orion Township has a total area of 36.80 square miles (95.31 km^{2}), of which 36.44 square miles (94.38 km^{2}) (or 99.01%) is land and 0.37 square miles (0.96 km^{2}) (or 0.99%) is water.

=== Unincorporated towns ===
- Breeds
- Rawalts

(This list is based on USGS data and may include former settlements.)

=== Cemeteries ===
The township contains these four cemeteries: Breeds, Orendorff, Red School and Wolf.

=== Major highways ===
- Illinois Route 9

== Demographics ==
As of the 2020 census, there were 1,145 people, 310 households, and 228 families residing in the township. The population density was 31.11 inhabitants per square mile (12.01/km^{2}). There were 513 housing units at an average density of 13.94 per square mile (5.38/km^{2}). The racial makeup of the township was 97.55% White, 0.17% African American, 0.44% Native American, 0.44% Asian, 0.00% Pacific Islander, 0.09% from other races, and 1.31% from two or more races. Hispanic or Latino people of any race made up 0.52% of the population.

There were 310 households, out of which 29.40% had children under the age of 18 living with them, 58.71% were married couples living together, 7.42% had a female householder with no spouse present, and 26.45% were non-families. 22.60% of all households were made up of individuals, and 10.30% had someone living alone who was 65 years of age or older. The average household size was 2.43, and the average family size was 2.84.

The township's age distribution consisted of 24.4% under the age of 18, 2.7% from 18 to 24, 19.8% from 25 to 44, 30.9% from 45 to 64, and 22.3% who were 65 years of age or older. The median age was 48.2 years. For every 100 females, there were 142.4 males. For every 100 females age 18 and over, there were 121.8 males.

The median income for a household in the township was $65,658, and the median income for a family was $88,500. Males had a median income of $35,000 versus $41,875 for females. The per capita income for the township was $34,013. About 0.0% of families and 7.0% of the population were below the poverty line, including 0.0% of those under age 18 and 4.8% of those age 65 or over.

Historical population
Census	Pop.	Note	%±
2000	998		—
2010	1,195		19.7%
2020	1,145		−4.2%
U.S. Decennial Census

== School districts ==
- Canton Union School District 66
- Farmington Central Community Unit School District 265
- Illini Bluffs Community Unit School District 327

== Political districts ==
- Illinois' 17th congressional district
- State House District 91
- State Senate District 46
