= Liverpool, Illinois =

- Village
- Location of Liverpool in Fulton County, Illinois.

- Location of Illinois in the United States
- Coordinates: 40°23′27″N 90°0′3″W
- Country: United States
- State: Illinois
- County: Fulton
- Township: Liverpool

Area
  - Total: 0.085 sq mi (0.22 km^{2})
  - Land: 0.085 sq mi (0.22 km^{2})
  - Water: 0 sq mi (0.00 km^{2})
- Elevation: 449 ft (137 m)

Population (2020)
  - Total: 94
  - Density: 1,117/sq mi (431.3/km^{2})
- Time zone: UTC-6 (CST)
  - Summer (DST): UTC-5 (CDT)
- ZIP Code(s): 61543
- Area code: 309
- FIPS code: 17-44121
- GNIS ID: 2398456
- Wikimedia Commons: Liverpool, Illinois

Liverpool is a village in Fulton County, Illinois, United States. As of the 2020 census, Liverpool had a population of 94.

== History ==
Liverpool was first settled in 1826. Multiple mills were established in the 1830s. In 1850 a plank road was established between Liverpool and Canton, Illinois.

== Geography ==
Liverpool is located in eastern Fulton County on the north bank of the Illinois River at river mile 128. It is 10 miles (16 km) east of Lewistown, the Fulton County seat, and 34 miles (55 km) southwest of Peoria.

According to the 2021 census gazetteer files, Liverpool has a total area of 0.09 square miles (0.23 km^{2}), of which 0.08 square miles (0.21 km^{2}) (or 98.82%) is land and 0.00 square miles (0.00 km^{2}) (or 1.18%) is water.

== Demographics ==
Historical population
Census	Pop.	Note	%±
1880	129		—
1960	184		—
1970	218		18.5%
1980	243		11.5%
1990	129		−46.9%
2000	119		−7.8%
2010	129		8.4%
2020	94		−27.1%
U.S. Decennial Census

As of the 2020 census there were 94 people, 63 households, and 29 families residing in the village. The population density was 1,105.88 inhabitants per square mile (426.98/km^{2}). There were 51 housing units at an average density of 600.00 per square mile (231.66/km^{2}). The racial makeup of the village was 95.74% White, 0.00% African American, 0.00% Native American, 0.00% Asian, 0.00% Pacific Islander, 1.06% from other races, and 3.19% from two or more races. Hispanic or Latino of any race were 2.13% of the population.

There were 63 households, out of which 27.0% had children under the age of 18 living with them, 42.86% were married couples living together, none had a female householder with no husband present, and 53.97% were non-families. 28.57% of all households were made up of individuals, and 17.46% had someone living alone who was 65 years of age or older. The average household size was 2.52 and the average family size was 2.03.

The village's age distribution consisted of 11.7% under the age of 18, 1.6% from 18 to 24, 30.4% from 25 to 44, 34.4% from 45 to 64, and 21.9% who were 65 years of age or older. The median age was 46.9 years. For every 100 females, there were 141.5 males. For every 100 females age 18 and over, there were 140.4 males.

The median income for a household in the village was $50,625, and the median income for a family was $65,938. Males had a median income of $36,250 versus $19,167 for females. The per capita income for the village was $23,359. No families and 3.3% of the population were below the poverty line, including none of those under age 18 and none of those age 65 or over.

== Transportation ==
Liverpool is located right off of U.S. Route 24 and Illinois Route 78. The closest airport for commercial service is General Wayne A. Downing Peoria International Airport, though the town's closest international access is from Chicago's Midway and O'Hare airports.
