= Leesburg, Illinois =

- Unincorporated community
- Location within Illinois Location within the United States
- Coordinates: 40°14′50″N 90°19′02″W
- Country: United States
- State: Illinois
- County: Fulton
- Elevation: 646 ft (197 m)
- Time zone: UTC-6 (Central (CST))
  - Summer (DST): UTC-5 (CDT)
- Area code: 309
- GNIS feature ID: 411919

Leesburg is an unincorporated community in Fulton County, Illinois, United States. Leesburg is northeast of Astoria. The community is located four miles north of U.S. Route 24 on the Ipava Blacktop (County Rd. 2).
