= Summum, Illinois =

- Unincorporated community
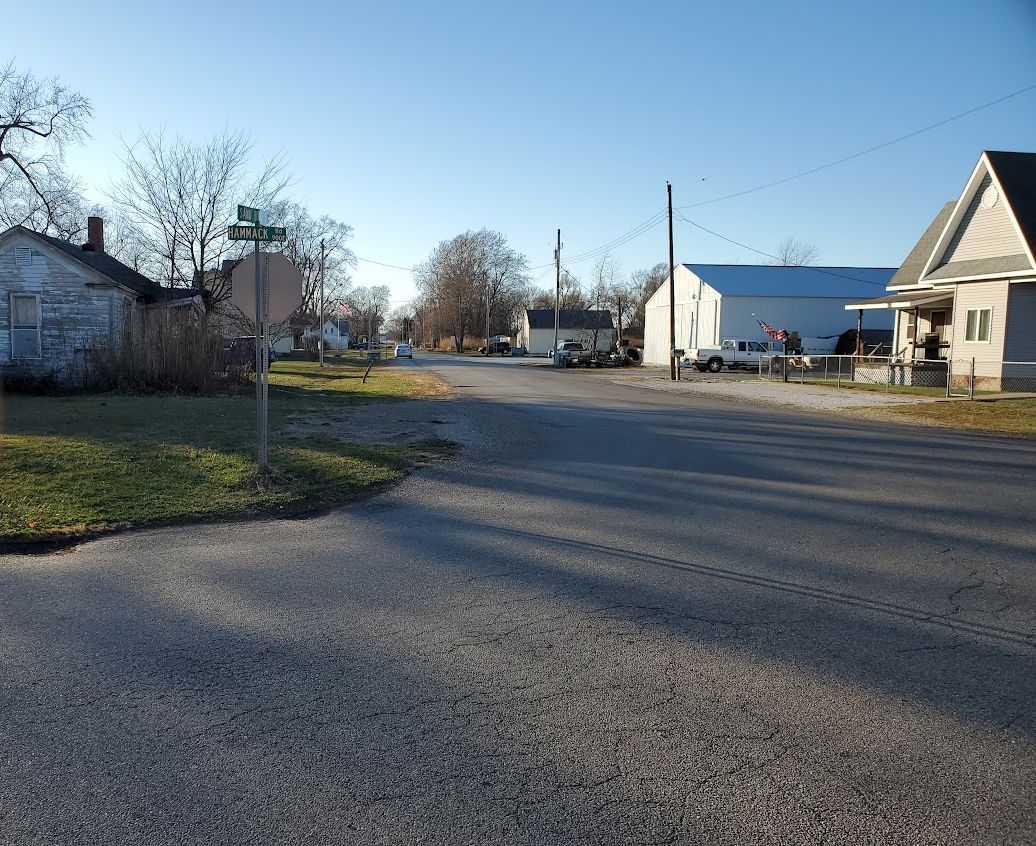
- View down Sand Branch Road in Summum.

- Location within Illinois Location within the United States
- Coordinates: 40°16′04″N 90°16′42″W
- Country: United States
- State: Illinois
- County: Fulton
- Elevation: 623 ft (190 m)
- Time zone: UTC-6 (Central (CST))
  - Summer (DST): UTC-5 (CDT)
- Area code: 309
- GNIS feature ID: 419359

Summum is an unincorporated community in Fulton County, Illinois, United States. Summum is located adjacent to U.S. Route 24 northeast of Astoria, in Woodland Township.

Summum gives its name to the Summum cyclothem and the associated "Summum coal" formation, which extends over much of western Illinois but is typically only a few inches thick.

One place the Summum coal reached a minable thickness was just north of Summum itself, where a strip mine was operated in the mid-20th century, from 1948 to 1955 by Key Coal Company and for some time thereafter by Peabody Coal Company. The strip mine was later converted into a small lake.

Notable people from Summum include country musician and comedian Smiley Burnette, who was born there in 1911.

== History ==
Summum takes its name from the Summum post office, which predated the town and took its name from early postmaster Peter Summy. The town was officially platted in 1851 by local mill owner James Madison Onion. The platted town was given the name "Oberlin," but that name never came into common usage.

In the late 19th century, Summum had a population of approximately 200. There were three churches (Baptist, Christian, and German Reformed Church) and a half-dozen stores. Few traces of this prosperity remain today.

=== Fay Rawley disappearance ===
Summum and its strip mine acquired nationwide notoriety in 1953, when wealthy local farmer, businessman and politician Fay Rawley disappeared. Rawley lived across the road from the coal mine, and his car was seen parked there on the last night he was known to be alive. He was widely suspected to have been murdered.

Rawley's disappearance spurred a massive multi-year search led by Fulton County Sheriff Virgil Ball, who took office in 1954. The search focused on the strip mine. The search drew thousands of curious onlookers and nationwide press attention. A dragline excavator was used to dig out a 150-foot opening where it was believed Rawley's car might have been covered by mining activity. Neither Rawley's car nor his body were ever located, and in 1957, the search was finally called off.

In 1962, the search was briefly resumed, now using bulldozers and partially financed by Ball himself, who was no longer sheriff. However, when the searchers' drill struck a large metal object, Peabody Coal demanded that the search be called off, out of fear of potential liability if Rawley's body was found. The case remains unsolved.
