= Woodland Township, Fulton County, Illinois =

Woodland Township
- Township
- Location in Fulton County

- Fulton County's location in Illinois
- Coordinates: 40°13′38″N 90°16′35″W
- Country: United States
- State: Illinois
- County: Fulton
- Established: November 6, 1849

Area
  - Total: 38.19 sq mi (98.9 km^{2})
  - Land: 37.96 sq mi (98.3 km^{2})
  - Water: 0.23 sq mi (0.60 km^{2}) 0.60%
- Elevation: 594 ft (181 m)

Population (2020)
  - Total: 345
  - Density: 9.09/sq mi (3.51/km^{2})
- Time zone: UTC-6 (CST)
  - Summer (DST): UTC-5 (CDT)
- ZIP codes: 61441, 61501
- FIPS code: 17-057-83089

Woodland Township is one of 26 townships in Fulton County, Illinois, USA. As of the 2020 census, its population was 345 and it contained 174 housing units.

== Geography ==
According to the 2021 census gazetteer files, Woodland Township has a total area of 38.19 square miles (98.91 km^{2}), of which 37.96 square miles (98.32 km^{2}) (or 99.40%) is land and 0.23 square miles (0.60 km^{2}) (or 0.60%) is water.

=== Unincorporated towns ===
- Beaty at 40.275044°N 90.245955°W
- Leesburg at 40.247267°N 90.317345°W
- Summum at 40.267822°N 90.278456°W

(This list is based on USGS data and may include former settlements.)

=== Cemeteries ===
The township contains these five cemeteries: Hart, Mount Zion, Summum, Summum Sixteen, and Woodland.

=== Major highways ===
- U.S. Route 24
- Illinois Route 100

=== Airports and landing strips ===
- Curless Airport

=== Landmarks ===
- Izaac Walton Park-private property

== Demographics ==
As of the 2020 census there were 345 people, 87 households, and 64 families residing in the township. The population density was 9.03 inhabitants per square mile (3.49/km^{2}). There were 174 housing units at an average density of 4.56 per square mile (1.76/km^{2}). The racial makeup of the township was 96.23% White, 0.29% African American, 0.00% Native American, 0.00% Asian, 0.00% Pacific Islander, 0.58% from other races, and 2.90% from two or more races. Hispanic or Latino of any race were 0.58% of the population.

There were 87 households, out of which 13.80% had children under the age of 18 living with them, 64.37% were married couples living together, 0.00% had a female householder with no spouse present, and 26.44% were non-families. 18.40% of all households were made up of individuals, and 8.00% had someone living alone who was 65 years of age or older. The average household size was 2.00 and the average family size was 2.02.

The township's age distribution consisted of 5.7% under the age of 18, 0.0% from 18 to 24, 15.5% from 25 to 44, 47.6% from 45 to 64, and 31.0% who were 65 years of age or older. The median age was 59.8 years. For every 100 females, there were 117.5 males. For every 100 females age 18 and over, there were 134.3 males.

The median income for a household in the township was $62,875, and the median income for a family was $63,000. Males had a median income of $51,750 versus $27,396 for females. The per capita income for the township was $52,164. About 12.5% of families and 20.7% of the population were below the poverty line, including 60.0% of those under age 18 and none of those age 65 or over.

Historical population
Census	Pop.	Note	%±
2000	413		—
2010	415		0.5%
2020	345		−16.9%
U.S. Decennial Census

== School districts ==
- Astoria Community Unit School District 1
- Lewistown School District 97

== Political districts ==
- Illinois' 17th congressional district
- State House District 94
- State Senate District 47
