= Table Grove Community Church =

Historic church in Illinois, United States

- U.S. National Register of Historic Places
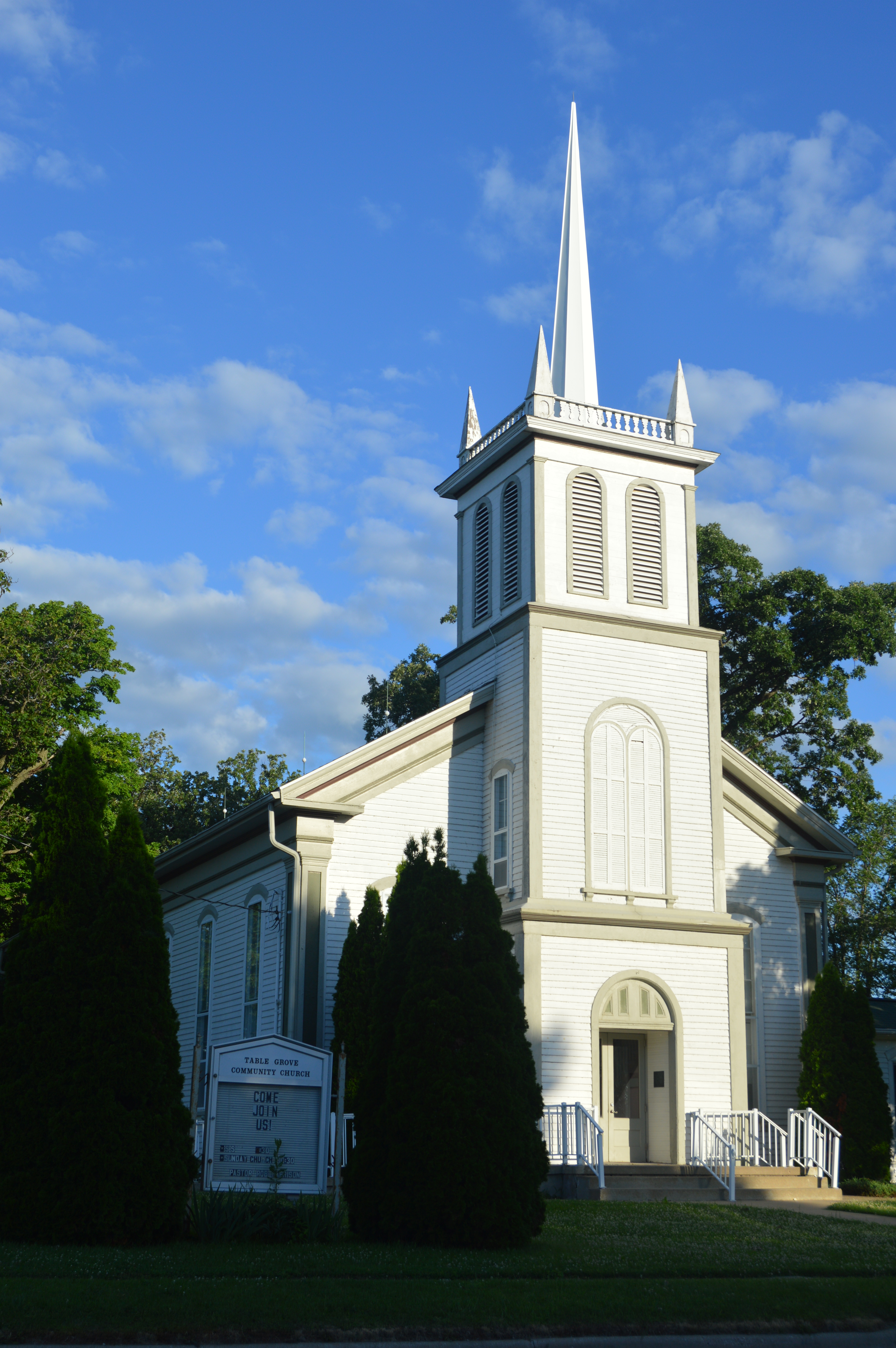
- Front of the church

- Location within Illinois Location within the United States
- Location: N. Broadway and W. Liberty Sts., Table Grove, Illinois
- Coordinates: 40°22′1″N 90°25′31″W
- Area: less than one acre
- Built: 1869
- Architectural style: Greek Revival, Italianate
- NRHP reference No.: 79003783
- Added to NRHP: February 9, 1979

Table Grove Community Church is a historic church located at the intersection of N. Broadway and W. Liberty Streets in Table Grove, Illinois. The clapboard church features a bell tower with pinnacles on its corners and a spire at its center. The building incorporates elements of multiple architectural styles. The broken pediments at either end of the church, the pilasters at the corners of the building, and the entablatures on the sides come from the Greek Revival style, while the arched windows and cornices and the louvered windows on the bell tower suggest the Italianate style.

The church was built in 1869; its architect is unknown, but its style resembles that used in a farm built by Thomas Berry, a member of its congregation. Originally a Universalist church, the church was led by John Hughes for its first eighteen years. In 1931, the Universalist congregation in Table Grove merged with the congregations of the Disciples of Christ and the Presbyterians to form a single Protestant church; the Illinois Universalist Congregation gave the new church the Universalists' building.

The church was added to the National Register of Historic Places on February 9, 1979.
