= Middlegrove, Illinois =

- Unincorporated community
- Location within Illinois Location within the United States
- Coordinates: 40°42′16″N 90°05′58″W
- Country: United States
- State: Illinois
- County: Fulton
- Elevation: 722 ft (220 m)
- Time zone: UTC-6 (Central (CST))
  - Summer (DST): UTC-5 (CDT)
- Area code: 309
- GNIS feature ID: 413503

Middlegrove is an unincorporated community in Fulton County, Illinois, United States. Middlegrove is located on Illinois Route 116 west of Farmington. Originally a town founded by the coal miners of the area, Middlegrove's village center is an old school house that documents some of the town's history. One notable picture is of Abraham Lincoln when he was campaigning for state senator. The village of Middlegrove remained a part of the miner's support with a small hotel until the 1900s, a restaurant until the 1990s, and a bar. When the local mining operations were halted around the turn of the 21st century, the village was generally forgotten, but continues to survive today.
