= Depler Springs, Illinois =

- Unincorporated community
- Location within Illinois Location within the United States
- Coordinates: 40°25′59″N 90°11′04″W
- Country: United States
- State: Illinois
- County: Fulton
- Elevation: 489 ft (149 m)
- Time zone: UTC-6 (Central (CST))
  - Summer (DST): UTC-5 (CDT)
- Area code: 309
- GNIS feature ID: 424178

Depler Springs is an unincorporated community in Fulton County, Illinois, United States. Depler Springs is near Illinois Route 97, between Cuba and Lewistown.
