= Breeds, Illinois =

- Unincorporated community
- Location within Illinois Location within the United States
- Coordinates: 40°33′19″N 89°55′13″W
- Country: United States
- State: Illinois
- County: Fulton
- Elevation: 482 ft (147 m)
- Time zone: UTC-6 (Central (CST))
  - Summer (DST): UTC-5 (CDT)
- Area code: 309
- GNIS feature ID: 404808

Breeds is an unincorporated community in Fulton County, Illinois, United States. Breeds is east of Canton.
