= Table Grove, Illinois =

- Village
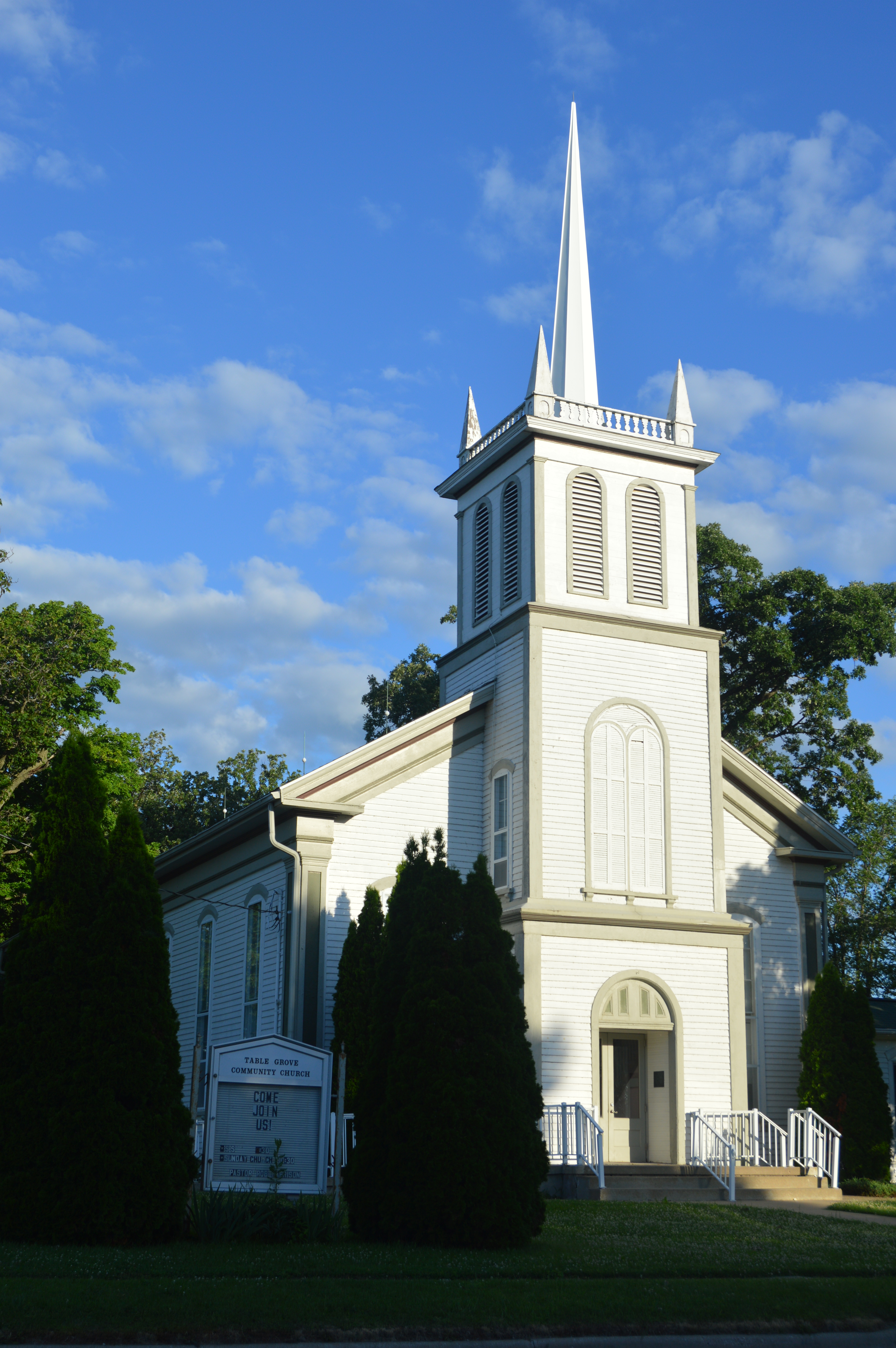
- Table Grove Community Church, a community landmark

- Location of Table Grove in Fulton County, Illinois.

- Location of Illinois in the United States
- Coordinates: 40°21′54″N 90°25′31″W
- Country: United States
- State: Illinois
- County: Fulton
- Townships: Farmers, Vermont

Government
  - Village President: Keith Krohe
  - Clerk: Angela Danner

Area
  - Total: 0.28 sq mi (0.73 km^{2})
  - Land: 0.28 sq mi (0.73 km^{2})
  - Water: 0 sq mi (0.00 km^{2})
- Elevation: 732 ft (223 m)

Population (2020)
  - Total: 353
  - Density: 1,253.1/sq mi (483.81/km^{2})
- Time zone: UTC-6 (CST)
  - Summer (DST): UTC-5 (CDT)
- ZIP Code(s): 61482
- Area code: 309
- FIPS code: 17-74301
- GNIS ID: 2399946
- Wikimedia Commons: Table Grove, Illinois

Table Grove is a village in Fulton County, Illinois, United States. Its population was 353 as of the 2020 census. The village was struck by an EF-1 tornado on April 4, 2023.

== Geography ==
Table Grove is located in western Fulton County. U.S. Route 136 passes through the center of the village, leading east 23 miles (37 km) to Havana and northwest 17 miles (27 km) to Macomb.

According to the 2021 census gazetteer files, Table Grove has a total area of 0.28 square miles (0.73 km^{2}), all land.

== Demographics ==
Historical population
Census	Pop.	Note	%±
1900	376		—
1910	544		44.7%
1920	610		12.1%
1930	463		−24.1%
1940	480		3.7%
1950	481		0.2%
1960	500		4.0%
1970	469		−6.2%
1980	489		4.3%
1990	408		−16.6%
2000	396		−2.9%
2010	416		5.1%
2020	353		−15.1%
U.S. Decennial Census

As of the 2020 census there were 353 people, 150 households, and 92 families residing in the village. The population density was 1,251.77 inhabitants per square mile (483.31/km^{2}). There were 170 housing units at an average density of 602.84 per square mile (232.76/km^{2}). The racial makeup of the village was 96.32% White, 0.00% African American, 0.57% Native American, 0.00% Asian, 0.00% Pacific Islander, 0.57% from other races, and 2.55% from two or more races. Hispanic or Latino of any race were 0.85% of the population.

There were 150 households, out of which 36.0% had children under the age of 18 living with them, 47.33% were married couples living together, 12.00% had a female householder with no husband present, and 38.67% were non-families. 31.33% of all households were made up of individuals, and 17.33% had someone living alone who was 65 years of age or older. The average household size was 3.04 and the average family size was 2.42.

The village's age distribution consisted of 28.4% under the age of 18, 11.6% from 18 to 24, 28.3% from 25 to 44, 17% from 45 to 64, and 14.6% who were 65 years of age or older. The median age was 32.1 years. For every 100 females, there were 92.1 males. For every 100 females age 18 and over, there were 84.4 males.

The median income for a household in the village was $49,583, and the median income for a family was $61,250. Males had a median income of $36,000 versus $19,643 for females. The per capita income for the village was $23,974. About 15.2% of families and 24.0% of the population were below the poverty line, including 27.2% of those under age 18 and 15.1% of those age 65 or over.

== Notable people ==
- J. Frank Houghton (1893 – 1968), member of the Florida Senate (1953–1959) and first Republican to serve in that body since 1930. He was a childhood resident of Table Grove, Illinois.
- Ray Edwin Powell (1887–1973), president of the company that became known as Alcan and chancellor of McGill University. He was a childhood resident of Table Grove.
