= Gilchrist, Fulton County, Illinois =

Gilchrist, Illinois
- Unincorporated community
- Location within Illinois Location within the United States
- Coordinates: 40°38′50″N 90°02′23″W
- Country: United States
- State: Illinois
- County: Fulton
- Elevation: 761 ft (232 m)
- Time zone: UTC-6 (Central (CST))
  - Summer (DST): UTC-5 (CDT)
- Area code: 309
- GNIS feature ID: 422736

Gilchrist is an unincorporated community in Farmington Township, Fulton County, Illinois, United States. Gilchrist is south of Farmington.
