= Babylon, Illinois =

- Unincorporated community
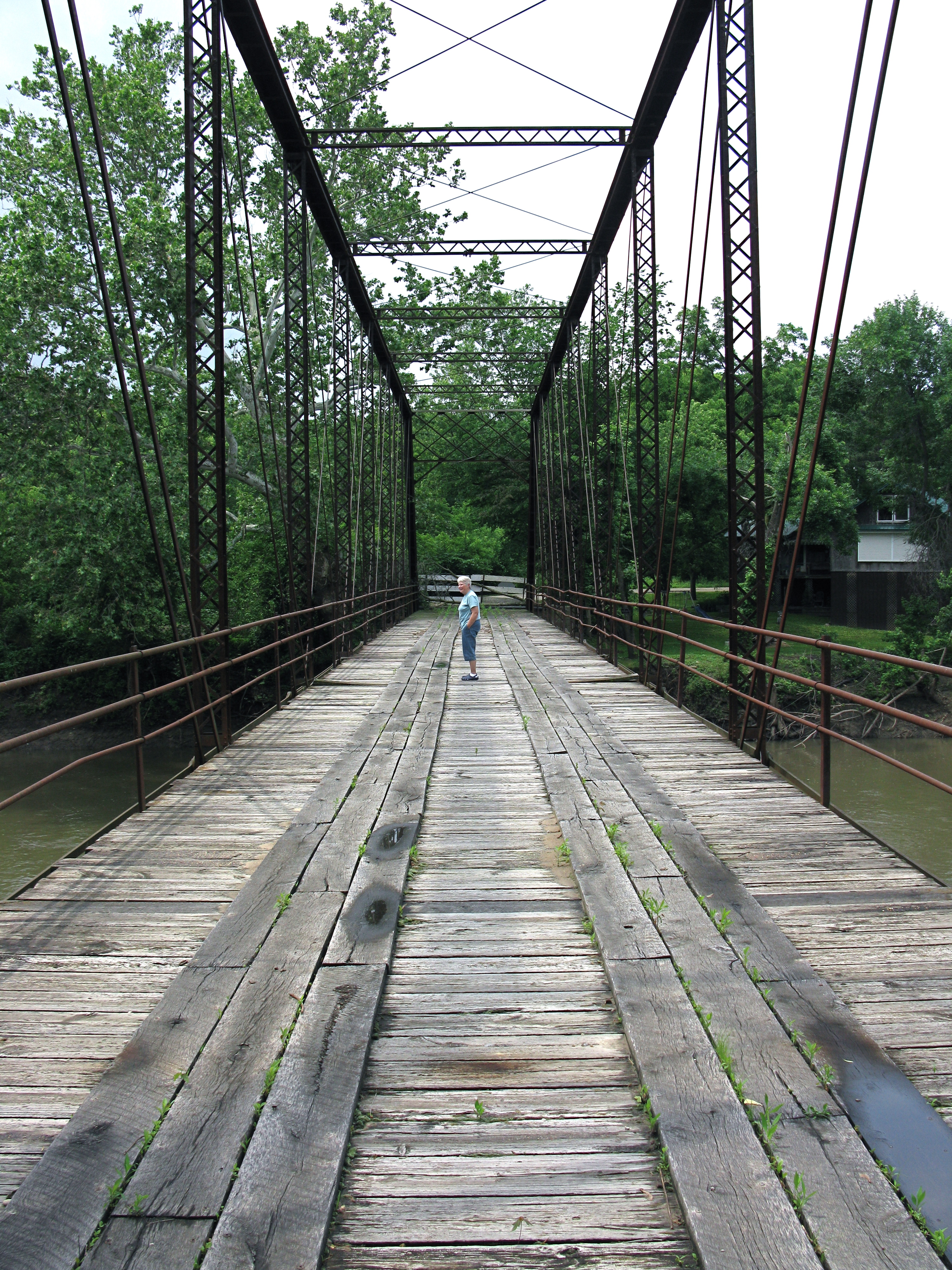
- The Old Babylon Bend Bridge (1890)

- Location within Illinois Location within the United States
- Coordinates: 40°35′27″N 90°20′57″W
- Country: United States
- State: Illinois
- County: Fulton
- Elevation: 512 ft (156 m)
- Time zone: UTC-6 (Central (CST))
  - Summer (DST): UTC-5 (CDT)
- Area code: 309
- GNIS feature ID: 422427

Babylon is an unincorporated community in Fulton County, Illinois, United States. The community is located on the Spoon River, north of Illinois Route 9 and south of Ellisville.
