= Enion, Illinois =

- Unincorporated community
- Location within Illinois Location within the United States
- Coordinates: 40°16′30″N 90°10′38″W
- Country: United States
- State: Illinois
- County: Fulton
- Elevation: 459 ft (140 m)
- Time zone: UTC-6 (Central (CST))
  - Summer (DST): UTC-5 (CDT)
- Area code: 309
- GNIS feature ID: 422672

Enion is an unincorporated community in Fulton County, Illinois, United States. Enion is located on Illinois Route 100 south of Lewistown.
