= Manley, Illinois =

- Unincorporated community
- Location within Illinois Location within the United States
- Coordinates: 40°35′02″N 90°25′32″W
- Country: United States
- State: Illinois
- County: Fulton
- Elevation: 646 ft (197 m)
- Time zone: UTC-6 (Central (CST))
  - Summer (DST): UTC-5 (CDT)
- Area code: 309
- GNIS feature ID: 422932

Manley is an unincorporated community in Fulton County, Illinois, United States. Manley is located along Illinois Route 9 northeast of Bushnell.
