= Maples Mill, Illinois =

- Unincorporated community
- Location within Illinois Location within the United States
- Coordinates: 40°25′42″N 90°01′50″W
- Country: United States
- State: Illinois
- County: Fulton
- Elevation: 577 ft (176 m)
- Time zone: UTC-6 (Central (CST))
  - Summer (DST): UTC-5 (CDT)
- Area code: 309
- GNIS feature ID: 412971

Maples Mill is an unincorporated community in Fulton County, Illinois, United States. Maples Mill was founded circa 1851 or 1852 by Thompson Maple as a sawmill village, and was also called Slabtown. The community was the site of an 1870s-era mill, a post office, school, church, and other businesses. For six years, an unusual wooden plank toll road ran between Canton and Liverpool through Maples Mill.

== Geography ==
Maples Mill is located on Illinois Route 78 south of Dunfermline. The community lies 8 miles (13 km) from Lewistown, the county seat.

== History ==
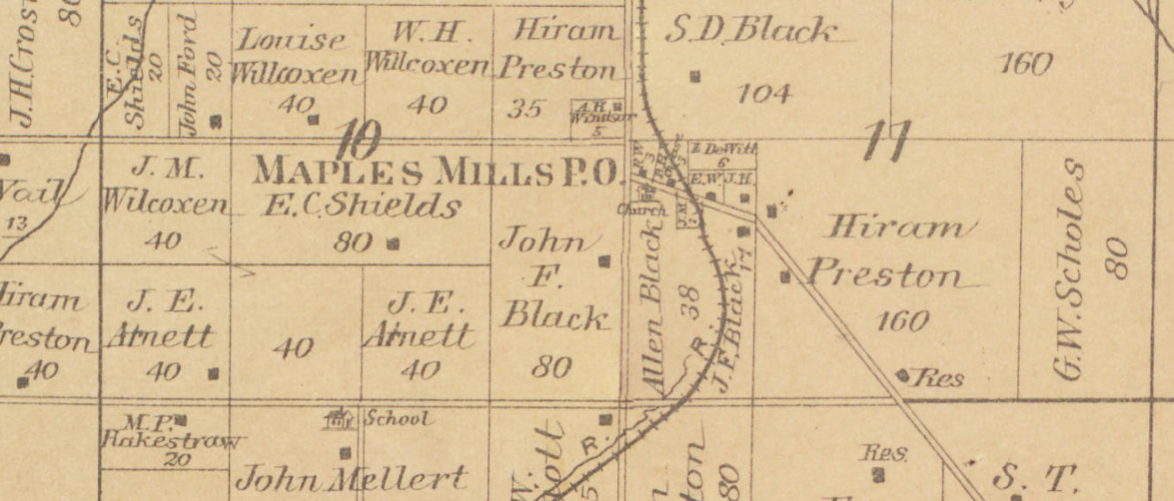
Maples Mills, in Liverpool Township, in 1895

Around 1851 or 1852, Maples Mill was founded as a saw mill village by Thompson Maple in sections 2, 3, 10, and 11 of Liverpool Township. The wood from the mill was used to supply oak planks for the Canton and Liverpool Plank Road. In 1879, the community was a village of 12 to 15 houses, along with a school, church, and post office. The mill was dismantled sometime prior to 1879. The population was 80 in 1890.

The "Slabtown" mill built by Thompson Maple, founder of the Canton and Liverpool Plank-Road Company, was used to build a plank road between Canton and Liverpool, through Maples Mill, at a cost of $40,000. According to the State Museum of Illinois, "[t]he plank road was just wide enough for one wagon, and in passing, one vehicle would have to turn out upon the dirt road. There were three toll gates arranged along the line at different places for the purpose of collecting the toll, which was so much per mile." The plank toll road proved unprofitable and costly to repair. After six years, Maple tore up the planks and reused the wood. This was the only plank road ever constructed in Fulton County.

Maples Mill Church operated during this time. The church was Methodist Episcopal. In addition to the church, Maple Mill School (one of eight district schools in the township) was also in operation. The post office was established in 1856 and closed in 1913. Hiram Preston was both the school treasurer and (for 22 years) the postmaster of Maples Mills.

The population was 33 in 1900, and was 62 in 1920.

The population of Maples Mill was 50 in 1940.

== See also ==
- Marbletown, Illinois
