= Fulton County, Illinois =

County in Illinois, United States

- County
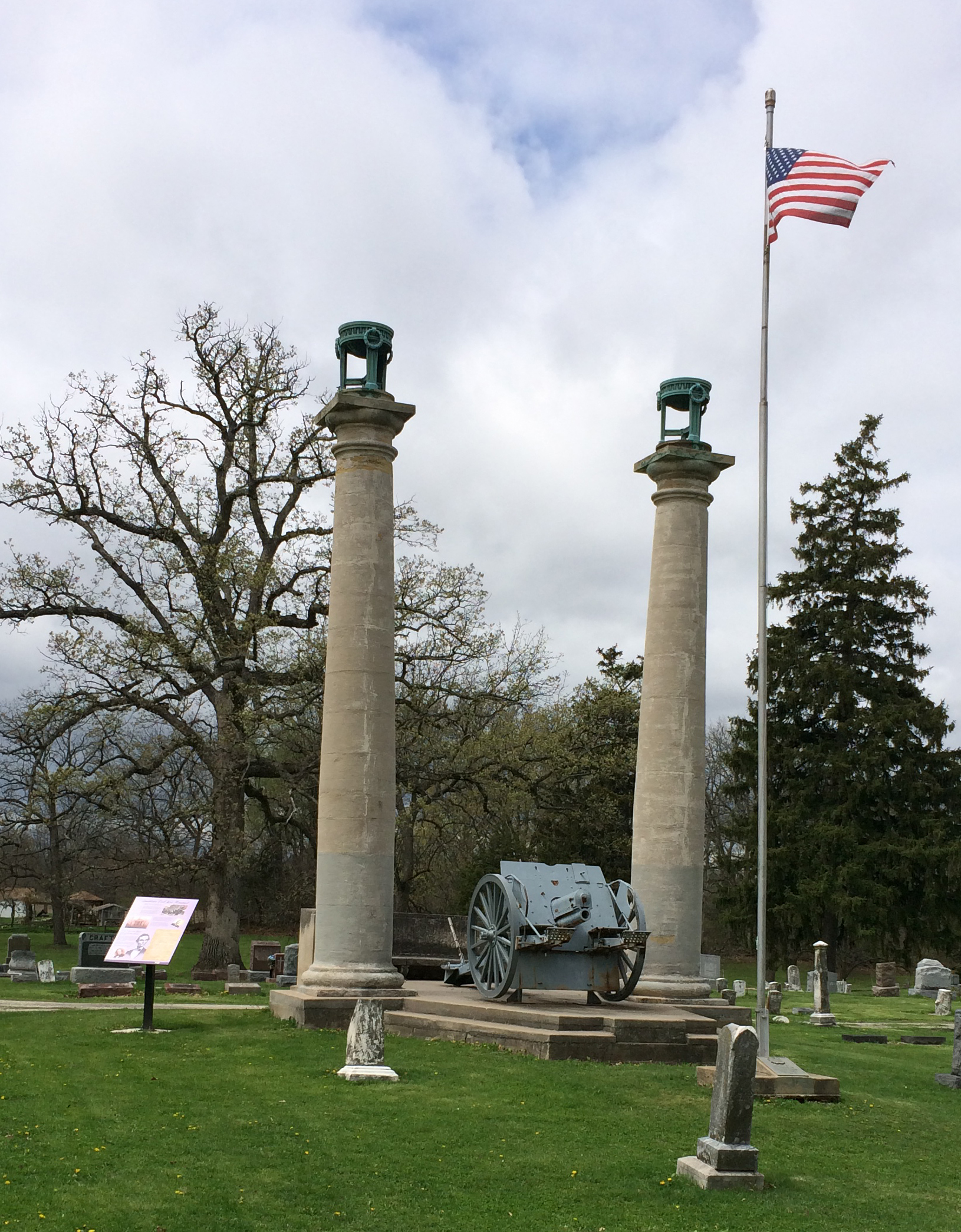
- The old courthouse columns at Oak Hill Cemetery

- Location within the U.S. state of Illinois
- Coordinates: 40°29′N 90°13′W
- Country: United States
- State: Illinois
- Founded: 1823
- Named for: Robert Fulton
- Seat: Lewistown
- Largest city: Canton

Area
  - Total: 883 sq mi (2,290 km^{2})
  - Land: 866 sq mi (2,240 km^{2})
  - Water: 17 sq mi (44 km^{2}) 1.9%

Population (2020)
  - Total: 33,609
  - Estimate (2025): 32,901 ▼
  - Density: 38.8/sq mi (15.0/km^{2})
- Time zone: UTC−6 (Central)
  - Summer (DST): UTC−5 (CDT)
- Congressional districts: 15th, 17th
- Website: fultoncountyil.gov

Fulton County is a county in the U.S. state of Illinois. According to the 2020 census, it had a population of 33,609. Its county seat is Lewistown, and the largest city is Canton. Fulton County comprises the Canton, IL Micropolitan Statistical Area, which is part of the Peoria–Canton, IL Combined Statistical Area.

== History ==
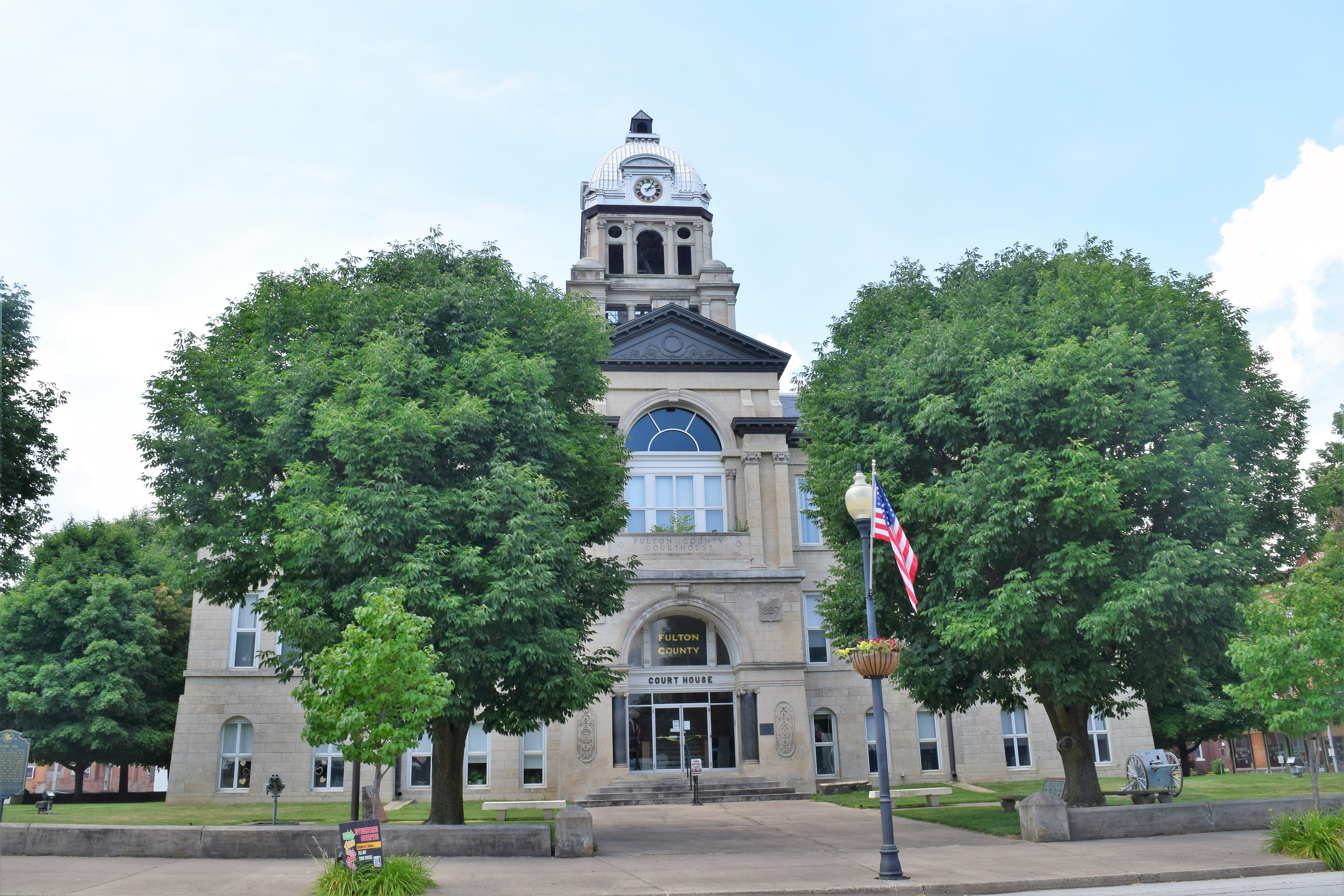
The Fulton County Courthouse in Lewistown, Illinois, the county seat of Fulton County, Illinois.

Fulton County was organized in 1823 from Pike County. It is named for Robert Fulton, developer of the first commercially successful steamboat. American poet and writer Edgar Lee Masters lived in Fulton County during the 1890s; he later became famous for the Spoon River Anthology, written in 1915.

Fulton County was home to Camp Ellis during World War II.

The county is known for the annual Spoon River Scenic Drive, which occurs the first 2 weekends in October. This has been a tradition since 1968 and attracts thousands of participants from all over the country.

Fulton County is home to the Ogden-Fettie Site, a significant site for Havana Hopewell Native culture. It is the largest collection of Woodland Mounds in Illinois, with 35 Mounds, dating from 400 BC, arranged in a crescent.

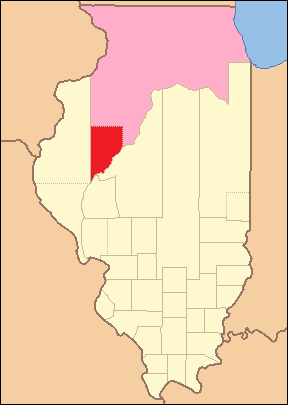
Fulton County between 1823 and 1825, including unorganized territory temporarily attached.

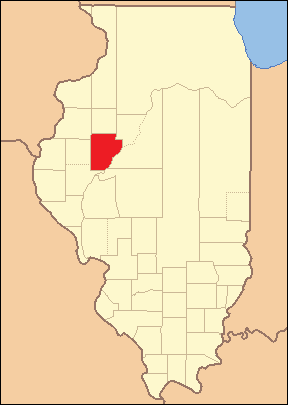
Fulton County, reduced to its current size in 1825, its unorganized territory formed into new counties.

== Geography ==
According to the US Census Bureau, the county has a total area of 883 square miles (2,290 km^{2}), of which 866 square miles (2,240 km^{2}) is land and 17 square miles (44 km^{2}) (1.9%) is water.

Fulton County is the site of Dickson Mounds Museum, a state museum of Native American daily life in the Illinois River valley.

=== Climate and weather ===
Lewistown, Illinois

Climate chart (precipitation, max. and min. temperature)
| J | F | M | A | M | J | J | A | S | O | N | D |
| 1.9 32 14 | 1.9 38 19 | 3 50 30 | 3.5 63 40 | 4.4 74 51 | 3.8 84 60 | 3.9 88 64 | 3.5 86 61 | 3.2 80 52 | 2.9 68 41 | 3.3 51 30 | 2.6 37 19 |
- █ Average max. and min. temperatures in °F
- █ Precipitation totals in inches
- Source: The Weather Channel
Metric conversion
| J | F | M | A | M | J | J | A | S | O | N | D |
| 47 0 −10 | 49 3 −7 | 77 10 −1 | 88 17 4 | 113 23 11 | 97 29 16 | 98 31 18 | 88 30 16 | 82 27 11 | 73 20 5 | 83 11 −1 | 67 3 −7 |
- █ Average max. and min. temperatures in °C
- █ Precipitation totals in mm

In recent years, average temperatures in the county seat of Lewistown have ranged from a low of 14 °F (−10 °C) in January to a high of 88 °F (31 °C) in July, although a record low of −30 °F (−34 °C) was recorded in January 1999 and a record high of 106 °F (41 °C) was recorded in July 1983. Average monthly precipitation ranged from 1.85 inches (47 mm) in January to 4.43 inches (113 mm) in May.

=== Adjacent counties ===
- Warren County – northwest
- Knox County – north
- Peoria County – northeast
- Tazewell County – east
- Mason County – south
- Schuyler County – southwest
- McDonough County – west

=== National protected area ===
- Emiquon National Wildlife Refuge

== Transportation ==
=== Major highways ===
- US Route 24
- US Route 136
- Illinois Route 9
- Illinois Route 41
- Illinois Route 78
- Illinois Route 95
- Illinois Route 97
- Illinois Route 100
- Illinois Route 116

=== Airport ===
The county contains one public-use airport: Ingersoll Airport (CTK), located in Canton.

== Demographics ==
Historical population
| Census | Pop. | Note | %± |
|---|---|---|---|
| 1830 | 1,841 | | — |
| 1840 | 13,142 | | 613.9% |
| 1850 | 22,508 | | 71.3% |
| 1860 | 33,338 | | 48.1% |
| 1870 | 38,291 | | 14.9% |
| 1880 | 41,240 | | 7.7% |
| 1890 | 43,110 | | 4.5% |
| 1900 | 46,201 | | 7.2% |
| 1910 | 49,549 | | 7.2% |
| 1920 | 48,163 | | −2.8% |
| 1930 | 43,983 | | −8.7% |
| 1940 | 44,627 | | 1.5% |
| 1950 | 43,716 | | −2.0% |
| 1960 | 41,954 | | −4.0% |
| 1970 | 41,890 | | −0.2% |
| 1980 | 43,687 | | 4.3% |
| 1990 | 38,080 | | −12.8% |
| 2000 | 38,250 | | 0.4% |
| 2010 | 37,069 | | −3.1% |
| 2020 | 33,609 | | −9.3% |
| 2025 (est.) | 32,901 | ▼ | −2.1% |
US Decennial Census; 1790-1960 1900-1990; 1990-2000 2010

2000 census age pyramid for Fulton County

=== 2020 census ===
As of the 2020 census, the county had a population of 33,609, a median age of 44.2 years, 19.7% of residents under the age of 18, and 22.0% of residents 65 years of age or older. There were 107.3 males for every 100 females and 108.0 males for every 100 females age 18 and over.

The racial makeup of the county was 91.7% White, 3.3% Black or African American, 0.2% American Indian and Alaska Native, 0.2% Asian, under 0.1% Native Hawaiian and Pacific Islander, 1.4% from some other race, and 3.2% from two or more races. Hispanic or Latino residents of any race comprised 2.2% of the population.

Thirty-nine point two percent of residents lived in urban areas, while 60.8% lived in rural areas.

There were 14,025 households in the county, of which 25.5% had children under the age of 18 living in them. Of all households, 46.0% were married-couple households, 19.8% were households with a male householder and no spouse or partner present, and 26.2% were households with a female householder and no spouse or partner present. About 32.4% of all households were made up of individuals and 16.0% had someone living alone who was 65 years of age or older.

There were 15,855 housing units, of which 11.5% were vacant. Among occupied housing units, 75.5% were owner-occupied and 24.5% were renter-occupied. The homeowner vacancy rate was 2.6% and the rental vacancy rate was 9.3%.

=== Racial and ethnic composition ===
Fulton County, Illinois – Racial and ethnic composition Note: the US Census treats Hispanic/Latino as an ethnic category. This table excludes Latinos from the racial categories and assigns them to a separate category. Hispanics/Latinos may be of any race.
| Race / ethnicity (NH = Non-Hispanic) | Pop 1980 | Pop 1990 | Pop 2000 | Pop 2010 | Pop 2020 | % 1980 | % 1990 | % 2000 | % 2010 | % 2020 |
|---|---|---|---|---|---|---|---|---|---|---|
| White alone (NH) | 43,274 | 36,988 | 36,068 | 34,397 | 30,616 | 99.05% | 97.13% | 94.30% | 92.79% | 91.09% |
| Black or African American alone (NH) | 119 | 663 | 1,369 | 1,268 | 1,102 | 0.27% | 1.74% | 3.58% | 3.42% | 3.28% |
| Native American or Alaska Native alone (NH) | 32 | 79 | 48 | 82 | 59 | 0.07% | 0.21% | 0.13% | 0.22% | 0.18% |
| Asian alone (NH) | 81 | 99 | 92 | 111 | 69 | 0.19% | 0.26% | 0.24% | 0.30% | 0.21% |
| Native Hawaiian or Pacific Islander alone (NH) | x | x | 4 | 2 | 6 | x | x | 0.01% | 0.01% | 0.02% |
| Other race alone (NH) | 40 | 7 | 8 | 14 | 77 | 0.09% | 0.02% | 0.02% | 0.04% | 0.23% |
| Mixed race or Multiracial (NH) | x | x | 183 | 299 | 942 | x | x | 0.48% | 0.81% | 2.80% |
| Hispanic or Latino (any race) | 141 | 244 | 478 | 896 | 738 | 0.32% | 0.64% | 1.25% | 2.42% | 2.20% |
| Total | 43,687 | 38,080 | 38,250 | 37,069 | 33,609 | 100.00% | 100.00% | 100.00% | 100.00% | 100.00% |

=== 2010 census ===
As of the 2010 United States census, there were 37,069 people, 14,536 households, and 9,744 families residing in the county. The population density was 42.8 inhabitants per square mile (16.5/km^{2}). There were 16,195 housing units at an average density of 18.7 per square mile (7.2/km^{2}). The racial makeup of the county was 93.4% white, 3.4% black or African American, 0.4% American Indian, 0.3% Asian, 1.6% from other races, and 0.9% from two or more races. Those of Hispanic or Latino origin made up 2.4% of the population. In terms of ancestry, 23.7% were German, 19.1% were American, 14.0% were English, and 13.2% were Irish.

Of the 14,536 households, 29.3% had children under the age of 18 living with them, 52.0% were married couples living together, 10.2% had a female householder with no husband present, 33.0% were non-families, and 28.1% of all households were made up of individuals. The average household size was 2.37 and the average family size was 2.86. The median age was 41.9 years.

The median income for a household in the county was $41,268 and the median income for a family was $50,596. Males had a median income of $41,376 versus $28,596 for females. The per capita income for the county was $20,309. About 9.9% of families and 13.8% of the population were below the poverty line, including 22.2% of those under age 18 and 8.0% of those age 65 or over.

== Communities ==
=== Cities ===
- Canton
- Cuba
- Farmington
- Lewistown (seat)

=== Town ===
- Astoria

=== Villages ===
- Avon
- Banner
- Bryant
- Dunfermline
- Ellisville
- Fairview
- Ipava
- Liverpool
- London Mills
- Marietta
- Norris
- Smithfield
- St. David
- Table Grove
- Vermont

=== Unincorporated communities ===
- Babylon
- Beaty
- Bernadotte
- Blyton
- Breeds
- Brereton
- Checkrow
- Depler Springs
- Duncan Mills
- Enion
- Fiatt
- Gilchrist
- Leesburg
- Little America
- Manley
- Maples Mill
- Marbletown
- Middlegrove
- Monterey
- Poverty Ridge
- Rawalts
- Sepo
- Seville
- Summum

=== Townships ===
- Astoria
- Banner
- Bernadotte
- Buckheart
- Canton
- Cass
- Deerfield
- Ellisville
- Fairview
- Farmers
- Farmington
- Harris
- Isabel
- Joshua
- Kerton
- Lee
- Lewistown
- Liverpool
- Orion
- Pleasant
- Putman
- Union
- Vermont
- Waterford
- Woodland
- Young Hickory

=== Bases ===
- Camp Ellis

== Politics ==
In its early years, Fulton County favored the Democratic Party, being one of the northernmost Democratic counties and the nearest to Yankee, then solidly Republican Northern Illinois. It was never won by a Republican until the Democratic Party moved towards the Populist Party’s policies under William Jennings Bryan, a change which resulted in the county voting Republican except in landslide victories between 1896 and 1960. In that period, Franklin D. Roosevelt in 1932 and 1936 was the solitary Democratic presidential candidate to gain a majority of the county’s vote.

However, the 1964 election saw the county trend Democratic – so much so that Hubert Humphrey gained a narrow plurality in his 1968 election loss. Despite not going Democratic again until 1988, the party would always remain competitive in the county, and between 1988 and 2012 every Democratic presidential candidate gained a majority in Fulton County. However, concern over economic decline in the “Rust Belt” saw Donald Trump produce a dramatic swing in the 2016 election, winning Fulton County by fifteen percentage points and gaining the best GOP record in the county since 1980. In 2020, Trump improved his margin significantly, the best Republican performance in the county since Nixon in 1972. In 2024, Trump improved the Republican strength again, reaching more than 60% of the vote.

United States presidential election results for Fulton County, Illinois
| Year | Republican | | Democratic | | Third party(ies) | |
| Year | No. | % | No. | % | No. | % |
|---|---|---|---|---|---|---|
| 1892 | 4,948 | 45.72% | 5,253 | 48.54% | 621 | 5.74% |
| 1896 | 6,195 | 50.35% | 5,979 | 48.60% | 129 | 1.05% |
| 1900 | 6,130 | 50.16% | 5,762 | 47.15% | 329 | 2.69% |
| 1904 | 6,373 | 56.67% | 3,791 | 33.71% | 1,082 | 9.62% |
| 1908 | 6,077 | 50.54% | 4,906 | 40.80% | 1,042 | 8.67% |
| 1912 | 3,334 | 27.33% | 3,902 | 31.98% | 4,965 | 40.69% |
| 1916 | 9,735 | 48.50% | 8,686 | 43.28% | 1,650 | 8.22% |
| 1920 | 9,523 | 59.25% | 5,293 | 32.93% | 1,256 | 7.81% |
| 1924 | 8,664 | 48.35% | 5,011 | 27.96% | 4,246 | 23.69% |
| 1928 | 10,600 | 59.95% | 6,591 | 37.28% | 489 | 2.77% |
| 1932 | 7,579 | 36.77% | 12,144 | 58.92% | 888 | 4.31% |
| 1936 | 10,130 | 43.25% | 12,864 | 54.92% | 428 | 1.83% |
| 1940 | 12,816 | 50.80% | 12,198 | 48.35% | 214 | 0.85% |
| 1944 | 11,117 | 54.96% | 8,946 | 44.22% | 166 | 0.82% |
| 1948 | 9,504 | 53.00% | 8,226 | 45.87% | 203 | 1.13% |
| 1952 | 13,302 | 61.13% | 8,414 | 38.67% | 44 | 0.20% |
| 1956 | 12,375 | 58.58% | 8,702 | 41.19% | 48 | 0.23% |
| 1960 | 11,999 | 53.93% | 10,194 | 45.81% | 58 | 0.26% |
| 1964 | 7,785 | 37.40% | 13,030 | 62.60% | 0 | 0.00% |
| 1968 | 9,582 | 46.72% | 9,622 | 46.92% | 1,305 | 6.36% |
| 1972 | 12,328 | 61.80% | 7,529 | 37.74% | 92 | 0.46% |
| 1976 | 9,588 | 50.23% | 9,314 | 48.79% | 188 | 0.98% |
| 1980 | 10,316 | 54.42% | 7,481 | 39.46% | 1,160 | 6.12% |
| 1984 | 9,147 | 49.77% | 9,131 | 49.69% | 99 | 0.54% |
| 1988 | 6,999 | 43.45% | 9,046 | 56.16% | 63 | 0.39% |
| 1992 | 5,062 | 28.60% | 9,725 | 54.94% | 2,914 | 16.46% |
| 1996 | 5,155 | 32.82% | 8,857 | 56.39% | 1,694 | 10.79% |
| 2000 | 6,936 | 42.61% | 8,940 | 54.92% | 401 | 2.46% |
| 2004 | 7,818 | 45.89% | 9,080 | 53.30% | 137 | 0.80% |
| 2008 | 6,251 | 38.19% | 9,732 | 59.45% | 386 | 2.36% |
| 2012 | 6,632 | 43.03% | 8,328 | 54.04% | 451 | 2.93% |
| 2016 | 8,492 | 53.76% | 6,133 | 38.82% | 1,172 | 7.42% |
| 2020 | 9,867 | 59.00% | 6,503 | 38.88% | 354 | 2.12% |
| 2024 | 9,827 | 60.62% | 5,980 | 36.89% | 405 | 2.50% |

== Education ==
School districts include:

- Abingdon-Avon Community Unit School District 276
- Astoria Community Unit School District 1
- Bushnell-Prairie City Community Unit School District 170
- Canton Union School District 66
- Farmington Central Community Unit School District 265
- Fulton County Community Unit School District 3
- Illini Bluffs Community Unit School District 327
- Lewistown Community Unit School District 97
- Schuyler-Industry Community Unit School District 5
- Spoon River Valley Community Unit School District 4
- V.I.T. Community Unit School District 2

== In popular culture ==
The fictional town of Lanford, Illinois in the sitcom Roseanne was initially set in Fulton County before on-air information placed the town elsewhere in the state.

== See also ==
- National Register of Historic Places listings in Fulton County, Illinois
