= Mound House (Greene County, Illinois) =

Archaeological site in Illinois, United States

- Mound House Site
- U.S. National Register of Historic Places
- Location within Illinois Location within the United States
- Location: Eastern bank of the Illinois River, ½ mile west of the end of 600E
- Nearest city: Hillview, Illinois
- Coordinates: 39°29′36″N 90°35′01″W
- Area: 10.5 acres (4.2 ha)
- NRHP reference No.: 78001148
- Added to NRHP: September 1, 1978

The Mound House is an archaeological site located in Greene County, Illinois in the Illinois River floodplain. The site is a multicomponent site; however, the mounds were constructed during the Middle Woodland period and are associated with the Havana Hopewell culture. The mound center has two identified mounds.

The site received its name because the previous landowner, a farmer, built a house on Mound 1, the largest mound. Since then the house has been removed and the land is owned by the Center for American Archeology.

The site was added to the National Register of Historic Places on September 1, 1978.

== See also ==
- List of archaeological sites on the National Register of Historic Places in Illinois
