= Checkrow, Illinois =

- Unincorporated community
- Location within Illinois Location within the United States
- Coordinates: 40°33′15″N 90°22′41″W
- Country: United States
- State: Illinois
- County: Fulton
- Elevation: 620 ft (190 m)
- Time zone: UTC-6 (Central (CST))
  - Summer (DST): UTC-5 (CDT)
- Area code: 309
- GNIS feature ID: 422542

Checkrow is an unincorporated community in Fulton County, Illinois, United States. Checkrow is located south of Illinois Route 9 and east of Bushnell.

It is home to Checkrow Community Church which has been serving the community for over seventy-five years.
