= Marbletown, Illinois =

- Unincorporated community
- Location within Illinois Location within the United States
- Coordinates: 40°13′53″N 90°11′50″W
- Country: United States
- State: Illinois
- County: Fulton
- Elevation: 453 ft (138 m)
- Time zone: UTC-6 (Central (CST))
  - Summer (DST): UTC-5 (CDT)
- Area code: 309
- GNIS feature ID: 1747959

Marbletown is an unincorporated community in Fulton County, Illinois, United States. Marbletown is located on Illinois Route 100 north of Bluff City.
