= Woodland Township, Carroll County, Illinois =

Woodland Township
- Township
- Location in Carroll County

- Carroll County's location in Illinois
- Coordinates: 42°09′09″N 90°02′50″W
- Country: United States
- State: Illinois
- County: Carroll

Government
  - Supervisor: Corine Charles

Area
  - Total: 36.61 sq mi (94.8 km^{2})
  - Land: 36.61 sq mi (94.8 km^{2})
  - Water: 0 sq mi (0 km^{2}) 0%
- Elevation: 630 ft (192 m)

Population (2020)
  - Total: 292
  - Density: 7.98/sq mi (3.08/km^{2})
- Time zone: UTC-6 (CST)
  - Summer (DST): UTC-5 (CDT)
- ZIP codes: 61028, 61053, 61074
- FIPS code: 17-015-83076

Woodland Township is one of twelve townships in Carroll County, Illinois, United States. As of the 2020 census, its population was 292 and it contained 157 housing units.

== Geography ==
According to the 2010 census, the township has a total area of 36.61 square miles (94.8 km^{2}), all land.

=== Unincorporated towns ===
(This list is based on USGS data and may include former settlements.)

=== Cemeteries ===
The township contains these two cemeteries: Woodland Brethren and Zion.

=== Major highways ===
- Illinois Route 78

== Demographics ==
As of the 2020 census there were 292 people, 149 households, and 91 families residing in the township. The population density was 7.98 inhabitants per square mile (3.08/km^{2}). There were 157 housing units at an average density of 4.29 per square mile (1.66/km^{2}). The racial makeup of the township was 96.58% White, 0.34% African American, 0.00% Native American, 0.00% Asian, 0.34% Pacific Islander, 0.00% from other races, and 2.74% from two or more races. Hispanic or Latino of any race were 1.37% of the population.

There were 149 households, out of which 0.00% had children under the age of 18 living with them, 61.07% were married couples living together, 0.00% had a female householder with no spouse present, and 38.93% were non-families. 38.90% of all households were made up of individuals, and 8.70% had someone living alone who was 65 years of age or older. The average household size was 1.62 and the average family size was 2.01.

The township's age distribution consisted of 0.0% under the age of 18, 4.1% from 18 to 24, 0.4% from 25 to 44, 32.8% from 45 to 64, and 62.7% who were 65 years of age or older. The median age was 66.2 years. For every 100 females, there were 151.0 males. For every 100 females age 18 and over, there were 151.0 males.

The median income for a household in the township was $59,063, and the median income for a family was $67,938. Males had a median income of $52,031 versus $6,688 for females. The per capita income for the township was $41,465.

Historical population
| Census | Pop. | Note | %± |
|---|---|---|---|
| 2010 | 280 | | — |
| 2020 | 292 | | 4.3% |
U.S. Decennial Census

== School districts ==
- West Carroll Community Unit School District 314

== Political districts ==
- Illinois' 16th congressional district
- State House District 71
- State Senate District 36
