= Astoria, Illinois =

- Town
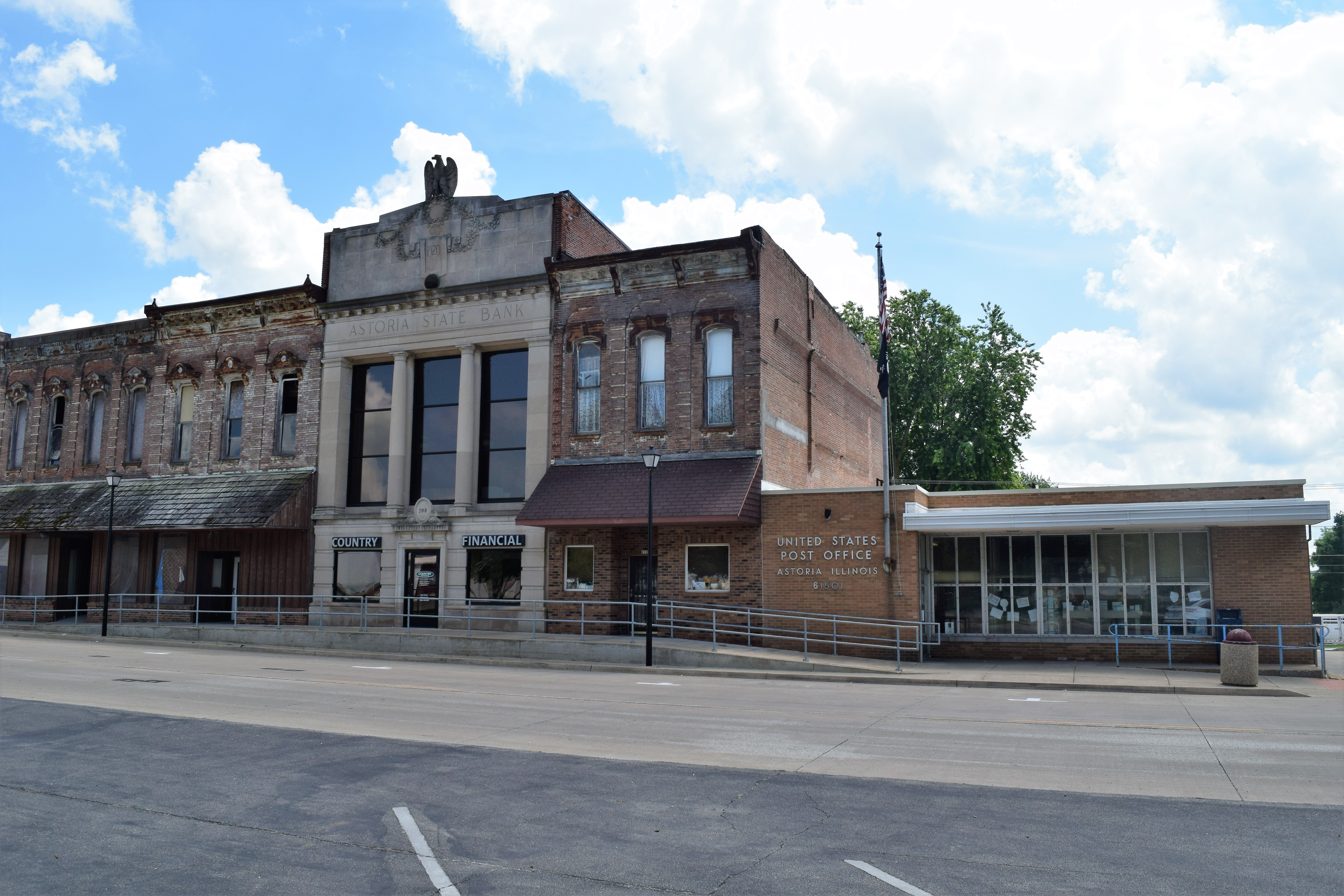
- Downtown Astoria

- Location of Astoria in Fulton County, Illinois.

- Location of Illinois in the United States
- Coordinates: 40°13′40″N 90°21′23″W
- Country: United States
- State: Illinois
- County: Fulton
- Township: Astoria
- Incorporated: January 24, 1839

Area
  - Total: 0.59 sq mi (1.52 km^{2})
  - Land: 0.59 sq mi (1.52 km^{2})
  - Water: 0 sq mi (0.00 km^{2})
- Elevation: 705 ft (215 m)

Population (2020)
  - Total: 929
  - Density: 1,586.7/sq mi (612.61/km^{2})
- Time zone: UTC-6 (CST)
  - Summer (DST): UTC-5 (CDT)
- ZIP Code(s): 61501
- Area code: 309
- FIPS code: 17-02635
- GNIS ID: 2398002
- Wikimedia Commons: Astoria, Illinois

Astoria is an incorporated town in Fulton County, Illinois, United States. The population was 929 at the 2020 census. It was originally laid out as the town of Washington in 1836, relocated as Vienna in 1837, and renamed as Astoria in 1839. The name honors fur titan John Jacob Astor, who supposedly owned land in or near the town.

== Geography ==
Astoria is located in southwestern Fulton County. U.S. Route 24 passes through the center of town, leading northeast 18 miles (29 km) to Lewistown, the county seat, and southwest 15 miles (24 km) to Rushville.

According to the 2021 census gazetteer files, Astoria has a total area of 0.59 square miles (1.53 km^{2}), all land.

== Demographics ==
Historical population
Census	Pop.	Note	%±
1880	1,280		—
1890	1,357		6.0%
1900	1,684		24.1%
1910	1,357		−19.4%
1920	1,340		−1.3%
1930	1,189		−11.3%
1940	1,292		8.7%
1950	1,308		1.2%
1960	1,206		−7.8%
1970	1,281		6.2%
1980	1,370		6.9%
1990	1,205		−12.0%
2000	1,193		−1.0%
2010	1,141		−4.4%
2020	929		−18.6%
U.S. Decennial Census

As of the 2020 census there were 929 people, 548 households, and 280 families residing in the town. The population density was 1,585.32 inhabitants per square mile (612.10/km^{2}). There were 478 housing units at an average density of 815.70 per square mile (314.94/km^{2}). The racial makeup of the town was 97.63% White, 0.11% African American, 0.00% Native American, 0.00% Asian, 0.00% Pacific Islander, 0.43% from other races, and 1.83% from two or more races. Hispanic or Latino of any race were 2.05% of the population.

There were 548 households, out of which 33.0% had children under the age of 18 living with them, 30.11% were married couples living together, 16.97% had a female householder with no husband present, and 48.91% were non-families. 36.13% of all households were made up of individuals, and 11.13% had someone living alone who was 65 years of age or older. The average household size was 2.93 and the average family size was 2.11.

The town's age distribution consisted of 26.9% under the age of 18, 10.7% from 18 to 24, 24.5% from 25 to 44, 24.9% from 45 to 64, and 13.1% who were 65 years of age or older. The median age was 32.6 years. For every 100 females, there were 93.3 males. For every 100 females age 18 and over, there were 83.3 males.

The median income for a household in the town was $38,068, and the median income for a family was $44,423. Males had a median income of $27,813 versus $21,103 for females. The per capita income for the town was $21,425. About 16.8% of families and 16.3% of the population were below the poverty line, including 15.8% of those under age 18 and 14.6% of those age 65 or over.

== Transportation ==
- U.S. Route 24
