= List of ship launches in 1852 =

The list of ship launches in 1852 includes a chronological list of some ships launched in 1852.

Date	Ship	Class	Builder	Location	Country	Notes
7 January	Susanna Dixon	Merchantman	James Robinson	Deptford	United Kingdom	For William Dixon.
8 January	Ambassador	Barque	Booth & Blacklock	Sunderland	United Kingdom	For E. Lumsdon & Sons.
8 January	Arethusa	Barque	William Bayley	Ipswich	United Kingdom	For A. Williams.
8 January	Madras	Steamship	Messrs. Tod & McGregor	Partick	United Kingdom	For Peninsular and Oriental Steam Navigation Company.
8 January	Mary Carr	Merchantman	Carr	Holyhead	United Kingdom	For private owner.
10 January	St. Lawrence	Full-rigged ship	Messrs. Denny & Rankin	Dumbarton	United Kingdom	For Messrs. Allan.
11 January	Weaver	Steamboat	John Laird	North Birkenhead	United Kingdom	For Bridgewater Trust.
15 January	Challenger	Lifeboat	Messrs. Richardson's	Manchester	United Kingdom	For private owners. Magazine Lifeboat, Liverpool.
20 January	Isidora	Yacht	Messrs Lecky & Co.	Dublin	United Kingdom	For Thomas Pim Jr.
22 January	Duke of Northampton	Full-rigged ship	Messrs. Coutts & Parkinson	Willington Quay	United Kingdom	For John Smith.
22 January	Pilot	Pilot ship	Andrew Woodhouse	South Shields	United Kingdom	For private owners.
January	Tornado	Clipper	Jabez Williams	Williamsburg, New York	United States	For W. T. Frost & Co and Benjamin Mumford.
5 February	Amazonas	Frigate	Messrs. Wigram & Sons	Blackwall	United Kingdom	For Peruvian Navy.
7 February	Clyde	East Indiaman	Messrs. Coutts and Parkinson	Willington Quay	United Kingdom	For John Smith.
9 February	City of Edinburgh	Merchantman	Messrs. Barclay and Curle	Stobcross	United Kingdom	For private owner.
10 February	America	Steamship	Messrs. Patterson & Son	Bristol	United Kingdom	For Eastern Steam Navigation Company.
21 February	Holyrood	Steamship	Messrs. Smith & Rodger	Govan	United Kingdom	For Charles King.
February	Emporium	Barque	Hodgson & Gardner	Sunderland	United Kingdom	For Lumsdon & Co.
February	Richard Battersby	Barque	John Smith	Pallion	United Kingdom	For Mr. Chisholm.
5 March	Australian	Steamship	Messrs. William Denny & Bros.	Dumbarton	United Kingdom	For Messrs. Burns.
6 March	Benjamin Adams	Full-rigged ship	Messrs. Trufant, Drummond & Co	Bath, Maine	United States	For Messrs. W. & J. T. Tapscott & Co.
6 March	Parana	Barque	Westacott	Barnstaple	United Kingdom	For private owner.
8 March	Defiance	Extreme clipper	George Thomas	Rockland, Maine	United States	For Isaac Taylor.
17 March	Welcome	Schooner	James Wake	Goole	United Kingdom	For Messrs. Wright, Ramsey & Co.
20 March	Melina	Schooner	Ghent	Plymouth	United Kingdom	For Mr. Soper Jr.
22 March	Hampden	Brig	Green & Parkinson	Hull	United Kingdom	For George Cammell.
22 March	John Knox	Barque	Messrs. Walter Hood & Co.	Aberdeen	United Kingdom	For P. Edward and Mr. Monro.
23 March	Veturia	Barque	S. Peter Austin	Sunderland	United Kingdom	For S. Peter Austin.
24 March	Miranda	Cutter yacht	Joseph White	East Cowes	United Kingdom	For J. Gray.
27 March	Antelope	Clipper	Perrine, Patterson & Stack	Williamsburg, New York	United States	For Henry Harbeck & Co.
30 March	Koh-i-Noor	Barque		Pwllheli	United Kingdom	For private owner.
March	Priam	Full-rigged ship	Pearch & Thackeray	Sunderland	United Kingdom	For John Banks.
3 April	Vivandiere	Schooner		Bideford	United Kingdom	For A. P. Harrison.
5 April	Hippogriffe	Medium clipper	Shiverick Brothers	East Denniss, Massachusetts	United States	For Christopher Hall and Prince S. Powell.
5 April	Queen of the Exe	Full-rigged ship	Holman	Topsham	United Kingdom	For private owner.
5 April	Roxburgh Castle	Full-rigged ship	William Pile Jr.	Sunderland	United Kingdom	For Messrs. Green.
6 April	Abeona	Merchantman	Hume & Easson	Pallion	United Kingdom	For T. White.
6 April	Elizabeth Mary	Schooner	E. Young	South Shields	United Kingdom	For A. H. Leslie.
6 April	Frances Henty	Full-rigged ship	Messrs. Hall's	Footdee	United Kingdom	For private owner.
6 April	George Kendall	Full-rigged ship	John Smith	Pallion	United Kingdom	For Messrs. Kendall.
6 April	Hawk	Brig	R. H. Potts & Bros.	Sunderland	United Kingdom	For Potts Bros.
6 April	King Richard Cœur de Lion	Merchantman	William Pile Jr.	Sunderland	United Kingdom	For Messrs. Green
6 April	Rosamond	Clipper	Messrs. Royden & Sons	Liverpool	United Kingdom	For Messrs. Samuel Johnson & Co.
7 April	Regard	Brig	Mrs. Stoveld	Blyth	United Kingdom	For Mr. Jefferson.
7 April	Lockett	Full-rigged ship	J. Brooke	Liverpool	United Kingdom	For J. Lockett and others.
7 April	Warrior Queen	Barque	Messrs. G. W. & W. J. Hall	Monkwearmouth	United Kingdom	For private owner.
8 April	Indiana	Steamship	Messrs. Mare & Co	Blackwall	United Kingdom	For General Screw Steam Company.
17 April	Formosa	Steamship	Smith & Rodger	Glasgow	United Kingdom	For Peninsular and Oriental Steam Navigation Company.
17 April	Satellite	Brig	Ratcliffe & Spence	Sunderland	United Kingdom	For James & John Trowsdale.
19 April	Beverley	Medium clipper	Paul Curtis	Medford, Connecticut	United States	For Israel Whitney and William Perkins.
19 April	John Gilpin	Extreme clipper	Samuel Hall	East Boston, Massachusetts	United States	For Pierce & Hunnewell.
19 April	Beverly	Extreme clipper	Paul Curtis	Medford, Massachusetts	United States	For Wm. Perkins & Israel Whitney.
21 April	Charlotte of Derby	Barque	Robert Thompson & Sons	Monkwearmouth	United Kingdom	For Thomas Ward.
21 April	Cosmopolitan	Steamship	Robert Napier and Sons	Govan	United Kingdom	For Messrs. William Sloan & Co.
21 April	Marina	Yacht	Ratsey	Cowes	United Kingdom	For W. J Foster.
21 April	Queen of the Wave	Barque	William Wilkinson	Deptford	United Kingdom	For T. Young.
21 April	Thomas Dryden	Barque	Bowman and Drummond	Blyth	United Kingdom	For Dryden & Co.
22 April	Constance	Barque	George Booth	Pallion	United Kingdom	For W. Thompson.
22 April	Messenger	Clipper	Jacob Bell	New York	United States	For Slade & Co.
April	Cleopatra	Steamship	Messrs. A. Denny & Brother	Dumbarton	United Kingdom	For M'Kean, M'Larty & Co.
April	David & Martha	Schooner	Havelock & Robson	Sunderland	United Kingdom	For David Tunnell.
April	Ellen Foster	Clipper	Joshua T. Foster	Medford, Massachusetts	United States	For J. & A. Tyrell.
April	Fanny Huntley	Merchantman	William Harkass	North Sands	United Kingdom	For Huntley & Co.
April	Unnamed	Barque	W. Wilkinson	Pallion	United Kingdom	For Messrs. Bradley & Potts.
1 May	Venus	Steamship	Messrs. J. & G. Thomson	Govan	United Kingdom	For Largs Steamboat Co.
5 May	Lady Falkland	Steamship		Bombay	India	For British East India Company.
5 May	Roehampton	Barque	Booth & Blacklock	Sunderland	United Kingdom	For Beckwith & Co.
5 May	The Queen	Steamship	Messrs. Stothert, Slaughter & Co.	Bristol	United Kingdom	For private owner.
6 May	Queen of the Isles	Schooner yacht	William Jackson	Liverpool	United Kingdom	For Robert Langtrys.
8 May	Prince	Steamship	Messrs. Harvey & Sons	Ipswich	United Kingdom	For Peter Bruff.
11 May	Nonpareil	Merchantman	Upham	Brixham	United Kingdom	For Messrs. Dart, Scovil & Culley.
18 May	Rose of Sharon	Full-rigged ship	William Wilkinson	Deptford	United Kingdom	For J. Miller.
20 May	Crystal Palace	Full-rigged ship	Mansfield	Teignmouth	United Kingdom	For John Lidgett.
22 May	Agamemnon	Agamemnon-class ship of the line		Woolwich Dockyard	United Kingdom	For Royal Navy.
22 May	Portena	Barque	Austin & Mills	Sunderland	United Kingdom	For Ben Darbyshire & partners.
May	Albion	Barque	Austin & Mills	Southwick	United Kingdom	For W. Stevens.
May	America	Merchantman	G. H. Parke	Quebec	(United Kingdom of Great Britain and Ireland) Province of Canada	For private owner.
May	Chevy Chase	Barque	J. & R. Candlish	Southwick	United Kingdom	For J. & R. Candlish.
May	Mary Grace	Snow	James Hardie	Southwick	United Kingdom	For J. Sewell.
May	Ocean Witch	Schooner	Henry Harvey	Littlehampton	United Kingdom	For Messrs. Gardam, Earle & Woodhall.
May	Queen of the South	Steamship		Blackwall, London	United Kingdom	For private owner.
May	Swan	Steamship		South Shields	United Kingdom	For Messrs. Swan & Co.
3 June	Ballarat	Full-rigged ship	Messrs. A. Duthie & Co.	Aberdeen	United Kingdom	For W. O. Young.
3 June	Gloriana	Schooner	Ratsey	Cowes	United Kingdom	For Mr. Gee.
3 June	Lady Ebrington	Clipper	Westacott	Barnstaple	United Kingdom	For private owner.
3 June	Laplace	Corvette		Lorient	France	For French Navy.
5 June	Julia	Merchantman	Messrs. Halls	Aberdeen	United Kingdom	For Liverpool Line.
7 June	Adventure	Snow	Robert Thompson & Sons	Sunderland	United Kingdom	For J. Purvis.
9 June	Soembing	Paddle steamer		Amsterdam	Netherlands	For Royal Netherlands Navy.
16 June	Tordenskjold	Frigate		Nyholm	Denmark	For Royal Danish Navy.
17 June	Star of the West	Paddle steamer	Jeremiah Simonson	New York	United States	For Cornelius Vanderbilt.
17 June	The Christopher	Clipper	Shaw	Torquay	United Kingdom	For Messrs. Stabb, Holmewood & Rowe
19 June	Cruizer	Cruizer-class sloop		Deptford Dockyard	United Kingdom	For Royal Navy.
19 June	Haggerston	Steamship	Messrs. Vernon & Sons	Liverpool	United Kingdom	For private owner.
19 June	Peggy	Barque	J. Robinson	Deptford	United Kingdom	For George Avery.
19 June	Sovereign of the Seas	Extreme clipper	Donald McKay	East Boston, Massachusetts	United States	For Donald McKay.
19 June	The Pioneer	Pilot boat	Messrs. W. B. Jones & Son	Liverpool	United Kingdom	For private owner.
19 June	Tynemouth	Barque	George Robinson	Blyth	United Kingdom	For Peter Dale.
21 June	Arabia	Ocean liner	R. Steele & Co.	Greenock	United Kingdom	For Cunard Line, or British and North American Steam Navigation Company.
23 June	Prinses Louise	Steamship		Coblentz	Prussia	For private owner.
30 June	Australia	Barque	Messrs. Rawson, Watson & Co.	Sunderland	United Kingdom	For C. Robert.
30 June	John Bowes	Collier	Palmer Brothers & Co.	Jarrow	United Kingdom	For Charles Mark Palmer.
30 June	Prince Alfred	Full-rigged ship	John Crown	Southwick	United Kingdom	For Pope Bros.
June	Annie Forster	Barque	Ralph Hutchinson	Sunderland	United Kingdom	For G. Forster.
June	Ballarat	Barque	R. & W. Hutchinson	Sunderland	United Kingdom	For Martin Lonie.
June	Ebba Brahe	Merchantman	Valin	Saint Roche	(United Kingdom of Great Britain and Ireland) Province of Canada	For private owner.
June	Lebanon	Barque	George Short	Sunderland	United Kingdom	For A. Strong.
June	Prodroma	Snow	Robert Reay	North Hylton	United Kingdom	For Mr. Richardson.
June	Uncle Sam	Paddle steamer	Domingo Marcucci	San Francisco	United States	For James Turnbull.
June	Zelus	Brig		Kristianstad	Sweden	For private owner.
2 July	Golden Fleece	Medium clipper	Paul Curtis	Boston, Massachusetts	United States	For Weld & Baker.
2 July	Polynesia	Clipper	Samuel Hall	Medford, Massachusetts	United States	For Pierce & Hunnewell.
3 July	Chemist	Merchantman		Rouen	France	For private owner.
3 July	Forerunner	Steamship	John Laird	Birkenhead	United Kingdom	For African Steam Navigation Company.
3 July	Francis Joseph	Steamship		Buda	Hungary	For private owner.
3 July	Onward	Extreme clipper	J. O. Curtis	Medford, Massachusetts	United States	For William Lincoln and Co.
3 July	Persian	Steamship	Messrs. Smith & Rodger	Glasgow	United Kingdom	For Messrs. Potter & Co.
3 July	Sir George Anderson	Full-rigged ship		Harwich Dockyard	United Kingdom	For private owner.
17 July	Anglesey	Steamship	Richard Green	River Thames	United Kingdom	For private owner.
30 July	Boadicea	Barque	Robert Thompson & Sons	Sunderland	United Kingdom	For Robert Pow, Margaret Fawcus, John Fawcus and George Dawson.
31 July	Aberfoyle	Full-rigged ship	Messrs. Denny & Rankin	Dumbarton	United Kingdom	For Messrs. P. & T. Aitken and others.
July	Catherine Glen	Full-rigged ship			(United Kingdom of Great Britain and Ireland) Colony of Nova Scotia	For private owner.
July	Henzi	Steamship		Venice	Austrian Empire	For private owner.
July	John Beynon	Brig	Hodgson & Gardiner	North Hylton	United Kingdom	For J. Beynon.
July	William Brown	Barque	Booth & Blacklock	North Sands	United Kingdom	For private owner.
July	Winged Arrow	Clipper	E. & H.O. Briggs	South Boston, Massachusetts	United States	For E. & H.O. Briggs.
2 August	Catherine Mitchell	Full-rigged ship	Messrs. A. M'Millan & Son	Dumbarton	United Kingdom	For John Mitchell.
4 August	Golden City	Extreme clipper	Jacob A. Westervelt	New York	United States	For Chambers & Heiser.
9 August	George Steers	Schooner	George Steers	New York	United States	For private owner.
16 August	Mountain Maid	Barque	Buchanan & Gibson	Sunderland	United Kingdom	For J. Gibson.
19 August	Ceres	Steamship	Messrs. Smith & Rodger	Govan	United Kingdom	For Messrs. Malcolmson.
19 August	Tinto	Merchantman	Joseph Steel Jr.	Liverpool	United Kingdom	For private owner.
20 August	Emigrant	Barque	Forrest & Co.	North Hylton	United Kingdom	For Mr. Denniston.
20 August	Typhoon	Clipper	Messrs. Alex Stephen & Sons	Kelvinhaugh	United Kingdom	For Potter, Wilson & Co.
23 August	Montebello	First rate		Toulon	France	For French Navy.
26 August	Malay	Clipper	John Taylor	Chelsea, Massachsetts	United States	For Silsbee, Stone & Pickman.
30 August	Hydaspes	Steamship	Messrs. Charles J. Mare & Co	Blackwall	United Kingdom	For General Screw Steam Shipping Company.
31 August	Ulidia	Barque	Messrs. M'Laine & Sons	Belfast	United Kingdom	For private owner.
August	Asia	Clipper	D. & J. Vaughan	St. Martins	(United Kingdom of Great Britain and Ireland) Colony of New Brunswick	For private owner.
August	Gem of the Ocean	Clipper	Hayden & Cudworth	Medford, Massachusetts	United States	For private owner.
August	Isabel	Schooner			(United Kingdom of Great Britain and Ireland) Colony of Prince Edward Island	For private owner.
August	Lord Delaval	Passenger ship	Messrs. Gowan's	Berwick upon Tweed	United Kingdom	For private owner.
2 September	Eagle	Steamship	Messrs. Thomas Vernon & Son	Liverpool	United Kingdom	For Mr. Dargan.
2 September	The Ondine	Steamship	Messrs. Smith & Rodger	Govan	United Kingdom	For Messrs. Malcolmson.
2 September	Wooloomooloo	Merchantman	Messrs. Walter Hood & Co.	Aberdeen	United Kingdom	For private owner.
4 September	William Henry	Schooner	Messrs. Sloan & Gemmell	Ayr	United Kingdom	For William Threlfall.
9 September	Flying Dutchman	Extreme clipper	William H. Webb	New York	United States	For William H. Webb.
11 September	El Princero	Steamship	John Thompson	Rotherhithe	United Kingdom	For Spanish Government.
13 September	Whirlwind	Extreme clipper	J .O. Curtis	Medford, Massachusetts	United States	For private owner.
14 September	Countess of Winton	Barque	Messrs. Barr & Shearer	Ardrossan	United Kingdom	For Messrs M'Dowall & Halliday.
14 September	Jean Bart	Suffren-class ship of the line		Lorient	France	For French Navy.
14 September	Westward Ho!	Extreme clipper	Donald McKay	East Boston, Massachusetts	United States	For Sampson & Tappan.
15 September	Austerlitz	Hercule-class ship of the line		Cherbourg	France	For French Navy.
15 September	Ericsson	Paddle steamer	Messrs. Perine, Patterson & Stack	New York	United States	For private owner.
15 September	Imperieuse	Frigate		Deptford Dockyard	United Kingdom	For Royal Navy.
16 September	Ionio	Steamship	Messrs. Miller, Ravenhill & Co.	Low Walker	United Kingdom	For Österreichischer Lloyd.
17 September	Hero of the Nile	Clipper	Messrs. J. & R. White	Cowes	United Kingdom	For James Shephard.
18 September	Queen of the Seas	Clipper	Paul Curtis	Medford, Massachusetts	United States	For Glidden & Williams.
21 September	Sir William Ffoulkes	Barque	Ratcliffe, Spence & Co.	Sunderland	United Kingdom	For William Miles.
21 September	Windsor Castle	First rate		Pembroke Dockyard	United Kingdom	For Royal Navy.
24 September	Westward Ho!	Extreme clipper	Donald McKay	East Boston, Massachusetts	United Kingdom	For Sampson & Tappan.
25 September	Reindeer	Steamship	Messrs. Blackwood & Gordon	Glasgow	United Kingdom	For private owner.
28 September	Gurtatone	Steamship		Venice	Austrian Empire	For private owner.
29 September	Osmanli	Steamship	Messrs. Alexander Denny & Brother	Dumbarton	United Kingdom	For Messrs. Vianna, Jones & Chappell.
30 September	Kangaroo	Acorn-class brig-sloop		Chatham Dockyard	United Kingdom	For Royal Navy.
30 September	W. S. Lindsay	Clipper	Messrs. Coutts & Parkinson	Newcastle upon Tyne	United Kingdom	For William Shaw Lindsay.
September	Alps	Steamship	Messrs. Denny and Brothers	Dumbarton	United Kingdom	For Messrs. G. & J. Burns.
September	Electricity	Barque	William Pile Jr.	Sunderland	United Kingdom	For Pile & Co.
September	George Bolton	Steam fishing vessel			United Kingdom	For private owner.
September	Ida	Barque	Robert Thompson & Sons	Sunderland	United Kingdom	For George Shotton.
September	Nugget	Schooner	William Reed	Coxgreen	United Kingdom	For C. Bailey.
September	Planet	Clipper	Messrs. Duthie	Aberdeen	United Kingdom	For private owner.
2 October	Tinqua	Extree clipper	Georged Raynes	Portsmouth, New Hampshire	United States	For Olyphant & Co.
9 October	Contest	Clipper	Jacob A. Westervelt	New York	United States	For A. A. Low & Brother.
9 October	Louis Napoleon	Merchantman	M. Arman, or M. Montané.	Bordeaux	France	For private owner.
10 October	Reina Doña Isabel II	Reina Doña Isabel II-class ship of the line	Arsenal de la Carraca	Cádiz	Spain	For Spanish Navy.
14 October	Marian Moore	Merchantman		Liverpool	United Kingdom	For private owner.
15 October	Rattler	Extreme clipper	George Thomas	Rockland, Maine	United States	For private owner.
16 October	Secundo	Steamship	Thompson	Rotherhithe	United Kingdom	For Spanish Navy.
18 October	Carrier Pigeon	Medium clipper	Hall, Snow & Co.	Bath, Maine	United States	For Reed, Wade & Co.
20 October	Velocidade	Full-rigged ship	Messrs. Hall	Aberdeen	United Kingdom	For private owner.
26 October	Lotus	Clipper	J. Taylor	Chelsea, Massachusetts	United States	For Dabney & Cunningham.
27 October	Meteor	Medium clipper	E. & H. O. Briggs	South Boston, Massachusetts	United States	For Curtis & Peabody.
28 October	Wings of the Morning	Clipper	Edwin Achorn	Waldboro, Maine	United States	For John Bulfinch and H. A. Lovell.
29 October	Gironde	Steamship	Messrs. Wood & Reed	Port-Glasgow	United Kingdom	For V. H. Smith.
30 October	Bengal	Steamship	Messrs. Tod and Macgregor	Glasgow	United Kingdom	For Peninsular and Oriental Steam Navigation Company.
October	Alboni	Clipper	Mason C. Hill	Mystic, Connecticut	United States	For private owner.
October	Central America	Paddle steamer	William H. Webb	New York	United States	For United States Mail Steamship Company.
October	Comte le Hon	Zinc-built sloop	M. Guibert	Nantes	France	For private owner.
October	Jane Hudson	Snow	J. Robinson	Deptford	United Kingdom	For G. Hudson.
October	Kate	Brig		Bathurst	(United Kingdom of Great Britain and Ireland) Colony of New Brunswick	For private owner.
October	Martaban	East Indiaman		Whitehaven	United Kingdom	For private owner.
October	Spes	Full-rigged ship	M'Millan	Greenock	United Kingdom	For private owner.
9 November	Golden Eagle	Extreme clipper	Hayden & Cudworth	Medford, Massachusetts	United States	For William Lincoln & Co.
11 November	Flying Childers	Medium clipper	Samuel Hall	East Boston, Massachusetts	United States	For J. M Forbes and Cunningham Bros.
12 November	Adelaide	Steamship	J. Scott, Russell & Co.	Millwall	United Kingdom	For Australian Company.
12 November	Coringa	Merchantman		Whitehaven	United Kingdom	For private owner.
12 November	Jacob Bell	Extreme clipper	Jacob Bell and Abraham C. Bell	New York	United States	For private owner.
13 November	Faith	Steamship	John Laird	Birkenhead	United Kingdom	For African Mail Company.
13 November	The Duke	Schooner	Messrs. W. B. Jones & Co.	Liverpool	United Kingdom	For private owner.
16 November	Golden West	Extreme clipper	Paul Curtis	Medford, Massachusetts	United States	For J.A. & T. A. Patterson.
27 November	Mona's Queen	Paddle steamer	J. and G. Thompson	Clydebank	United Kingdom	For Isle of Man Steam Packet Company.
November	Bald Eagle	Extreme clipper	Donald McKay	East Boston, Massachusetts	United States	For George B. Upton.
November	Julia	Clipper		Quebec	(United Kingdom of Great Britain and Ireland) Province of Canada	For private owner.
November	Queen of the Pacific	Medium clipper		Pembroke, Maine	United States	For Reed, Wade & Co.
November	Red Rover	Clipper	Fernald & Pettigrew	Portsmouth, New Hampshire	United States	For R. L. Taylor.
November	Rurik	Frigate		Helsinki	(Russian Empire) Grand Duchy of Finland	For Finnish Navy.
November	Winged Racer	Clipper	Robert E. Jackson	East Boston, Massachusetts	United States	For Seccomb & Taylor.
4 December	Simoon	Clipper	Jabez Williams	Williamsburg, New York	United States	For Benjamin A. Mumford & Co.
8 December	Phantom	Medium clipper	Samuel Lapham	Medford, Massachusetts	United States	For Crocker & Warren.
9 December	Duque de Porto	Steamship	Thomas Toward	Newcastle upon Tyne	United Kingdom	For private owner.
9 December	William Hutt	Collier	Messrs. Palmer & Co.	Jarrow	United Kingdom	For General Iron Screw Collier Company.
9 December	Star of the Union	Extreme clipper	J. O. Curtis	Medford, Massachusetts	United States	For Reed, Wade & Co.
10 December	Prince Albert	Paddle steamer	Messrs. Smith & Rodger	Govan	United Kingdom	For Messrs. Potter, Wilson & Co.
11 December	Corsetjee	Flatboat		Bombay	India	For British East India Company.
13 December	Mountain Wave	Medium clipper	Joshua Magoun	Charlestown, Massachusetts	United States	For Alpheus Hardy & Co.
20 December	Rapid	Clipper	Roosevelt & Joyce	New York	United States	For James Bishop & Co.
23 December	Challenger	Clipper	Richard & Henry Green	Blackwall Yard	United Kingdom	For Hugh Hamilton Lindsay.
23 December	Feyz-i Cihat	Frigate	C.J. Mare and Company	Blackwall	United Kingdom	For Egyptian Navy.
29 December	Archer	Clipper	James M. Hood		United States	For Crocker & Warren.
29 December	The Queen	Steamship	Messrs. Wingate	Whiteinch	United Kingdom	For private owner.
30 December	Goleitka	Schooner	Camper	Gosport	United Kingdom	For Prince Levaboff.
December	Flying Arrow	Medium clipper	Isaac Dunham	Frankfort, Maine	United States	For James Arey & Co.
December	Flying Eagle	Clipper	William Hitchcock	Newcastle, Maine	United States	For Frederick Nickerson & Co.
December	Mary Spring	Barque		Calais, Maine	United States	For private owner.
Unknown date	Abrahm & Sarah	Snow	H. Carr	North Hylton	United Kingdom	For Lotinga & Co.
Unknown date	Acacia	Barque	J. T. Alcock	Sunderland	United Kingdom	For C. Alcock.
Unknown date	Adolphus	Brigantine		Miramichi	(United Kingdom of Great Britain and Ireland) Colony of New Brunswick	For private owner.
Unknown date	Advance	Merchantman	Stockton Iron Shipbuilding Co.	Stockton-on-Tees	United Kingdom	For private owner.
Unknown date	Agusta Schneider	Merchantman	William Crown	Southwick	United Kingdom	For private owner.
Unknown date	A. Houghton	Barque	James P. Rideout	Robbinston, Maine	United States	For private owner.
Unknown date	Akbar	Full-rigged ship	J. Robinson	Deptford	United Kingdom	For Mr. Shallcross.
Unknown date	Alexander	Clipper	Hayden & Cudworth	Medford, Massachusetts	United States	For J. A. Baxter & Co.
Unknown date	Alfred the Great	Full-rigged ship	J. & R. Candlish	Southwick	United Kingdom	For Mr. Mackinlay.
Unknown date	Alice Thompson	Barque	Pile & Smart	North Sands	United Kingdom	For J. Thompson.
Unknown date	Alice Walker	Barque	Todd & Brown	North Hylton	United Kingdom	For Walker & Co.
Unknown date	Antagonist	Barque	W. Briggs	Southwick	United Kingdom	For Mr. Barnett.
Unknown date	Appleton	Full-rigged ship	John Watson	Pallion	United Kingdom	For private owner.
Unknown date	Atalanta	Clipper	Gardner & Palmer	Baltimore, Maryland	United States	For Montell & Co.
Unknown date	Aurora	Full-rigged ship	William Pile	Sunderland	United Kingdom	For Mr. Dent.
Unknown date	Australia	Clipper	William H. Webb	New York	United States	For Williams & Guion.
Unknown date	Ayres Quay	Schooner	James Laing	Sunderland	United Kingdom	For Mr. Corner.
Unknown date	Banshee	Barque	Edward Bailey	Pallion	United Kingdom	For J. Towse.
Unknown date	Blackheath	Full-rigged ship	Syes & Co.	North Hylton	United Kingdom	For Bonus & Co.
Unknown date	Boadicea	Merchantman	J. R. Candlish	Sunderland	United Kingdom	For private owner.
Unknown date	Brahan Castle	Schooner	John Smith	Pallion	United Kingdom	For Smith & Co.
Unknown date	Bullfinch	Barque	Booth & Blacklock	Sunderland	United Kingdom	For T. Gunton.
Unknown date	Calliope	Full-rigged ship		Sunderland	United Kingdom	For J. Rogers.
Unknown date	Caroline Chisholm	Barque	Todd & Brown	North Hylton	United Kingdom	For Mr. Trowsdale.
Unknown date	Caroni	Barque	William Harkass	Sunderland	United Kingdom	For Mr. Mackintosh.
Unknown date	Cecilia	Barque	George Barker	Sunderland	United Kingdom	For Walker & Co.
Unknown date	Celestial Empire	Clipper	Jotham Stetson	South Boston, Massachusetts	United States	For C. H. Parsons & Co.
Unknown date	Chinsura	Barque	James Hardie	Southwick	United Kingdom	For John Hay.
Unknown date	Circassia	Barque	William Carr	Sunderland	United Kingdom	For J. Wright.
Unknown date	City of Boston	Steamship		Medford, Massachusetts	United Kingdom	For private owner.
Unknown date	City of Kandy	Barque	James Laing	Deptford	United Kingdom	For Cowie & Co.
Unknown date	City of Peterborough	Barque	Peter Austin	Sunderland	United Kingdom	For R. Young.
Unknown date	Colinda	Barque	Andrew Leithead	Sunderland	United Kingdom	For William Hay.
Unknown date	Conciliator	Barque	Hobson & Gardener	Sunderland	United Kingdom	For Mr. Atkinson.
Unknown date	Dauntless	Extreme clipper	Benjamin F. Delano	Medford, Massachusetts	United States	For W. N. Goddard.
Unknown date	Derwent Water	Barque	William Harkass	North Sands	United Kingdom	For Mr. Richardson.
Unknown date	Dilston	Barque	John Barkes	Sunderland	United Kingdom	For White & Co.
Unknown date	Dorothy	Barque	George Worthy	Southwick	United Kingdom	For T. Bell.
Unknown date	Ebba Brahe	Full-rigged ship		Quebec	(United Kingdom of Great Britain and Ireland) Province of Canada	For private owner.
Unknown date	Eleanor	Merchantman	John Smith	Sunderland	United Kingdom	For private owner.
Unknown date	Eliza Battle	Paddle steamer		New Albany, Indiana	United Kingdom	For Cox, Brainard & Co.
Unknown date	Elizabeth Harrison	Snow	S. Hodgson	Sunderland	United Kingdom	For A. Harrison.
Unknown date	Elizabeth Morrison	Snow	Ratcliff & Co.	Sunderland	United Kingdom	For Mr. Morrison.
Unknown date	Ellen Foster	Medium clipper	Joshua T. Foster	Medford, Massachusetts	United States	For J. & A. Tirrell.
Unknown date	Elra	Merchantman	Ralph Hutchinson	Sunderland	United Kingdom	For private owner.
Unknown date	Emily Kate	Snow	Ratcliff, Spence & Co.	Sunderland	United Kingdom	For Rowntree & Co.
Unknown date	Empress	Barque	Thomas Stonehouse	Ravenswheel	United Kingdom	For Pearson & Co.
Unknown date	Euroclydon	Snow	W. H. Pearson	Panns	United Kingdom	For William Hay.
Unknown date	Evadne	Barque	M. Byers	Sunderland	United Kingdom	For James J. Scott & Henry Scott.
Unknown date	Fleetwood	Medium clipper	George Raynes	Portsmouth, New Hampshire	United States	For Sewell, Johnson & Co.
Unknown date	Flying Childers	Barque	Pile & Smart	North Sands	United Kingdom	For Brice & Co.
Unknown date	Formosa	Full-rigged ship	W. G. Bennett & Co.	Sunderland	United Kingdom	For H. Sawell.
Unknown date	Franklin	Barque		La Rochelle	France	For private owner.
Unknown date	Gem of the Ocean	Medium clipper	Hayden & Cudworth	Medford, Massachusetts	United States	For .
Unknown date	Gloucester	Full-rigged ship	Watson	Sunderland	United Kingdom	For J. Lidgett.
Unknown date	Glynaeron	Schooner		Aberaeron	United Kingdom	For private owner.
Unknown date	Golconda	Full-rigged ship	Robert Thompson & Sons	Sunderland	United Kingdom	For Blair & Co.
Unknown date	Halcyon	Snow	S. Hodgson	Sunderland	United Kingdom	For Clark & Co.
Unknown date	Hannah	Snow	G. W. & W. J. Hall	Sunderland	United Kingdom	For T. Tadd.
Unknown date	Harbinger	Barque	Rawson Watson & Co.	Sunderland	United Kingdom	For G. White.
Unknown date	Harry Gillespie	Clipper			United Kingdom	For private owner.
Unknown date	Henry Ellis	Full-rigged ship	William G. Bennett & Co.	Sunderland	United Kingdom	For H. Ellis.
Unknown date	Henry Gillespie	Clipper			United Kingdom	For private owner.
Unknown date	Howard	Paddle steamer		New Albany, Indiana	United States	For private owner.
Unknown date	Hunchback	Ferry		New York	United States	For private owner.
Unknown date	Hussar	Clipper	G. W. Jackman	Newburyport, Massachusetts	United States	For Bush & Wildes.
Unknown date	Hylton	Snow		Sunderland	United Kingdom	For private owner.
Unknown date	Hyperion	Medium clipper	J. C. C. Morton	Thomaston, Maine	United States	For private owner.
Unknown date	I. C.	Collier	Byerley	Rudmore	United Kingdom	For private owner.
Unknown date	Imogen	Snow	Sykes & Co	North Hylton	United Kingdom	For Barber & Co.
Unknown date	Isabella	Barque	William Naizby	Sunderland	United Kingdom	For Mr. Robinson.
Unknown date	Jane Gray	Barque	John Smith	Pallion	United Kingdom	For G. Gray.
Unknown date	Jane Roper	Schooner	William Ashburner	Barrow-in-Furness	United Kingdom	For Harrison, Ainslie & Co.
Unknown date	John Gilpin	Clipper	Samuel Hall	Boston, Massachusetts	United States	For Pierce & Hunnewell.
Unknown date	John Martin	Barque	Hylton Carr	North Hylton	United Kingdom	For Martin & Co.
Unknown date	Kate Hooper	Medium clipper	Hunt & Wagner	Baltimore, Maryland	United States	For J. A. Hooper.
Unknown date	Kenilworth	Full-rigged ship	S. P. Austin	Bishopwearmouth	United Kingdom	For Blair & Co.
Unknown date	Knight	Barque	Todd & Brown	North Hylton	United Kingdom	For J. Brooks.
Unknown date	Kolienor	Barque		River Tyne	United Kingdom	For private owner.
Unknown date	Kossuth	Barque	Buchanan & Gibson	Sunderland	United Kingdom	For Mr. Buchanan.
Unknown date	Lady Franklin	Clipper	Jarvis Pratt	East Boston, Massachusetts	United States	For Mr. Nagle.
Unknown date	Lady Suffolk	Full-rigged ship	Adams, Gray, and Son	Baltimore, Maryland	United States	For Don Julin Zulueta.
Unknown date	Lancashire Witch	Barque	G. W. & W. J. Hall	Sunderland	United Kingdom	For J. Longton.
Unknown date	Lavinia	Snow	John Watson	Sunderland	United Kingdom	For Mr. Rennison.
Unknown date	Levanter	Clipper	Metcalf & Norris	Newcastle, Maine	United States	For Smith & Boynton and Naylor & Co.
Unknown date	Liberty	Brig		Sunderland	United Kingdom	For private owner.
Unknown date	Lizzie Webber	Snow	W. G. Bennett & Co	Sunderland	United Kingdom	For Thomas Stephenson Rowntree and John Webber.
Unknown date	Loftus	Schooner	George Foster	Sunderland	United Kingdom	For T. Hindson.
Unknown date	Lottie Sleigh	Barque			(United Kingdom of Great Britain and Ireland) Colony of Prince Edward Island	For Hatton & Cookson.
Unknown date	Louisa	Snow	Booth & Blacklock	Sunderland	United Kingdom	For G. Foster.
Unknown date	Mars	Paddle steamer	Wigram	Blackwall	United Kingdom	For private owner.
Unknown date	Mary Henzell	Barque	M. Byers	Sunderland	United Kingdom	For G. Avery.
Unknown date	Mercator	Full-rigged ship	Austin & Mills	Sunderland	United Kingdom	For Mr. Harrison.
Unknown date	Merchantman	Full-rigged ship	James Laing	Sunderland	United Kingdom	For Soames Bros.
Unknown date	Meridian	Full-rigged ship	G. W. & W. J. Hall	Sunderland	United Kingdom	For Hall & Co.
Unknown date	Meteor	Barque	William Pile Jr.	Sunderland	United Kingdom	For Young & Co.
Unknown date	Mohi	Brig	John Barkes	Sunderland	United Kingdom	For Barkes & Co.
Unknown date	Morris	Snow	Andrew Leithead	Pallion	United Kingdom	For James Hay.
Unknown date	Narayana	Barque	John Barkes or George Barker	Sunderland	United Kingdom	For Cowen & Co.
Unknown date	National Eagle	Medium clipper	Joshua T. Foster	Medford, Massachusetts	United States	For Fisher & Co.
Unknown date	Nene Valley	Barque	S. P. Austin	Bishopwearmouth	United Kingdom	For R. Young.
Unknown date	Nornen	Corvette			Norway	For Royal Norwegian Navy.
Unknown date	Nymph	Barque	James Laing	Sunderland	United Kingdom	For P. Pellier.
Unknown date	Oak	Lighter	John Smith	Pallion	United Kingdom	For private owner.
Unknown date	Ocean Spray	Clipper	George Dunham and others	Frankfort, Maine	United States	For Veasie & Co.
Unknown date	Orestes	Barque	John Watson	Pallion	United Kingdom	For Shield & Co.
Unknown date	Otodini	Barque	Richard Wilkinson	Pallion	United Kingdom	For Shotton & Co.
Unknown date	Pactolus	Barque	Rawson & Watson	Southwick	United Kingdom	For S. Turney.
Unknown date	Peacock	Snow	Bartram & Lister	Sunderland	United Kingdom	For Mr. Peacock.
Unknown date	Peony	Barque	John Thomas Alcock	Sunderland	United Kingdom	For T. Alcock.
Unknown date	Perseverance	Schooner		Sunderland	United Kingdom	For private owner.
Unknown date	Phoenician	Snow	William Petrie	South Hylton	United Kingdom	For Hay & Co.
Unknown date	Pocahontas	Barque	George Short	Sunderland	United Kingdom	For James Leslie.
Unknown date	Princess Royal	Barque	Buchanan & Gibson	Sunderland	United Kingdom	For Hopper & Co.
Unknown date	Providence	Snow	Robert Reay	North Hylton	United Kingdom	For William Ray.
Unknown date	Queen Bee	Barque	William Crown	Southwick	United Kingdom	For John Longton.
Unknown date	Queen of the East	Clipper	Metcalf & Noriss	Damariscotta, Maine	United States	For Crocker & Warren.
Unknown date	Queen of the Teign	Barque	Thomas Lightfoot	Hylton Dene	United Kingdom	For W. Stooke.
Unknown date	Reaper	Snow	W. Wilkinson	Sunderland	United Kingdom	For Mr. Wilkinson.
Unknown date	Rebecca	Merchantman	William Reed	Coxgreen	United Kingdom	For Mr. Storm.
Unknown date	Rebecca Shout	Barque	Peverley & Charlton	Sunderland	United Kingdom	For Shout & Co.
Unknown date	Resolution	Barque	William Chilton	Sunderland	United Kingdom	For R. Stephens.
Unknown date	Rival	Barque	William Pile Jr.	Sunderland	United Kingdom	For private owner.
Unknown date	Sarah & Isabella	Snow	John Barkes	Sunderland	United Kingdom	For Mr. Watson.
Unknown date	Saxon Maid	Merchantman	Bradley & Potts	Sunderland	United Kingdom	For Bradley & Potts.
Unknown date	Semiramis	Barque	Arrow Leithead	Pallion	United Kingdom	For M. Tweddell.
Unknown date	Senator	Barque	Forrest & Co.	Sunderland	United Kingdom	For Lumsden & Sons.
Unknown date	Shaftesbury	Merchantman	Mr. Oswald	Sunderland	United Kingdom	For J. Z. Pessan.
Unknown date	Shoalwater	Paddle steamer	Leonard White	Canemah	(United States) Oregon Territory	For McCarver & White.
Unknown date	Sirocco	Clipper	William & George Gardner	Baltimore, Maryland	United States	For Damon & Hancock.
Unknown date	Sir Walter Raleigh	Barque	John Smith	Pallion	United Kingdom	For W. A. Barr.
Unknown date	Snaresbrook	Barque		Sunderland, County Durham	United Kingdom	For private owner.
Unknown date	Spinning Jenny	Merchantman	Bennett & Co.	Sunderland	United Kingdom	For private owner.
Unknown date	St. Olaf	Frigate			Norway	For Royal Norwegian Navy.
Unknown date	Strathfieldsaye	Barque	John Haswell	Sunderland	United Kingdom	For Pope & Co.
Unknown date	Time & Truth	Barque	William Henry Pearson	Panns	United Kingdom	For Mr. Mitcheson.
Unknown date	Toledo	Snow	William Petrie	South Hylton	United Kingdom	For W. Hay.
Unknown date	Torrent	Barque		Bath, Maine	United States	For private owner.
Unknown date	Underwriter	Paddle steamer		Brooklyn, New York	United States	For private owner.
Unknown date	Vestal	Yacht	Messrs. Inmn	Lymington	United Kingdom	For B. G. Rowles.
Unknown date	Victoria Regia	Full-rigged ship	Robert Thompson & Sons	Sunderland	United Kingdom	For Mr. Nicholson.
Unknown date	Washington	Barque	William Naizby	Sunderland	United Kingdom	For Robert Miles Sloman.
Unknown date	Wave Queen	Paddle steamer	J. Scott Russell		United Kingdom	For private owner.
Unknown date	Wilkinsons	Snow	Havelock & Robson	Sunderland	United Kingdom	For Messrs. Wilkinsons.
Unknown date	William	Full-rigged ship	Arrow Leithead	Sunderland	United Kingdom	For John Hay.
Unknown date	William & June	Merchantman	James Laing	Sunderland	United Kingdom	For private owner.
Unknown date	William Connal	East Indiaman	Simons	Greenock	United Kingdom	For private owner.
Unknown date	William Wheatley	Barque	S. Hodgson	Sunderland	United Kingdom	For Mr. Wheatley.
Unknown date	Winged Arrow	Medium clipper	E. & H. O. Briggs	South Boston, Massachusetts	United States	For Baker & Morrill.
Unknown date	Witch of the Wave	Barque	Edward Bailey	Pallion	United Kingdom	For J. Tinn.
Unknown date	Woodbine	Snow	Robert Reay	North Hylton	United Kingdom	For W. Doxford.
