= List of shipwrecks in March 1859 =

The list of shipwrecks in March 1859 includes ships sunk, foundered, grounded, or otherwise lost during March 1859.

== 1 March ==
List of shipwrecks: 1 March 1859
Ship	State	Description
Brisk	United Kingdom	The brigantine was driven ashore at Wells-next-the-Sea, Norfolk. She was on a voyage from Hartlepool, County Durham to London. She was refloated and resumed her voyage.
Champion	United Kingdom	The steamship ran aground at Berwick upon Tweed, Northumberland. She was on a voyage from Harlingen, Friesland, Netherlands to Newcastle upon Tyne, Northumberland.
Margaret Luke	United Kingdom	The ship was wrecked at Burghead, Moray. Her crew were rescued. She was on a voyage from Peterhead, Aberdeenshire to Inverness.
Notre Dame de Lotivi	France	The schooner sprang a leak and sank off Carnlough, County Antrim, United Kingdom. Her crew were rescued. She was on a voyage from the Clyde to Havre de Grâce, Seine-Inférieure, France.

== 2 March ==
List of shipwrecks: 2 March 1859
Ship	State	Description
Deux Cousines	France	The schooner ran aground on the Whitburn Steel, on the coast of County Durham, United Kingdom. She was refloated and taken in to North Shields, County Durham.
Esquimaux	United Kingdom	The ship was destroyed by fire at Halifax, Nova Scotia, British North America.
Lisbonnaise	France	The schooner was driven ashore at Fleetwood, Lancashire, United Kingdom. She was on a voyage from La Rochelle, Charente-Inférieure to Preston, Lancashire.
Louisa	Kingdom of Sardinia	The brig was wrecked on the Arklow Bank, in the Irish Sea off the coast of County Wicklow, United Kingdom. Her nine crew survived.
Margaret	United Kingdom	The Mersey Flat struck St. Patrick's Causeway and sank 2 nautical miles (3.7 km) off Barmouth, Merionethshire. Her crew were rescued. She was on a voyage from Barmouth to Aberdovey.
Sumatra	Netherlands	The ship was driven ashore near Seaford, Sussex, United Kingdom. She was on a voyage from Amsterdam, North Holland to Batavia, Netherlands East Indies. She was refloated and towed in to Portsmouth, Hampshire, United Kingdom for repairs.

== 3 March ==
List of shipwrecks: 3 March 1859
Ship	State	Description
Roehampton	United Kingdom	The full-rigged ship foundered in the Pacific Ocean. Her crew survived. She was on a voyage from Callao to the Chincha Islands, Peru.

== 4 March ==
List of shipwrecks: 4 March 1859
Ship	State	Description
Nautilus	United Kingdom	The ship ran aground on rocks off Coquet Island, Northumberland. She was on a voyage from Dundee, Forfarshire to London. She was refloated and taken in to Warkworth, Northumberland in a leaky condition.
Thalia	United Kingdom	The steamship collided with Beagle (United Kingdom) and sank 38 nautical miles (70 km) south west half west of the Eddystone Lighthouse. Her crew were rescued by Beagle. Thalia was on a voyage from Cádiz, Spain to London.

== 5 March ==
List of shipwrecks: 5 March 1859
Ship	State	Description
Carthagena	United Kingdom	The barque ran aground and broke her back at Maranhão, Brazil. She was on a voyage from Maranhão to Liverpool, Lancashire. She was refloated, taken in to Maranhão and beached.
El Dorado	Chile	The ship was wrecked on Texel, North Holland, Netherlands with the loss of her pilot. She was on a voyage from Caldera to Hamburg.

== 6 March ==
List of shipwrecks: 6 March 1859
Ship	State	Description
Eliza	United Kingdom	The schooner capsized and sank at Waterford. Her crew survived.
Mail	United Kingdom	The steamship ran aground near the Dundalk Lighthouse, County Louth. Her crew were rescued. She was on a voyage from Ardrossan, Ayrshire to Dundalk, County Louth. She later broke in two and was a total loss.
Susan and Isabella	United Kingdom	The schooner ran aground on the Sow and Pigs Rocks, in the North Sea off the coast of Northumberland. She was on a voyage from Seaham, County Durham to Dundee, Forfarshire. She was refloated and resumed her voyage.

== 7 March ==
List of shipwrecks: 7 March 1859
Ship	State	Description
Ebenezer	United Kingdom	The schooner was wrecked at Irvine, Ayrshire. Her four crew were rescued by the Irvine Lifeboat.
Glasgow	United Kingdom	The ship was wrecked at Juist, Duchy of Holstein. Her crew were rescued. She was on a voyage from Hartlepool, County Durham to Hamburg.
Magnet	United Kingdom	The ship struck rocks at Redcar, Yorkshire. She floated off and sank. Her crew survived.
Marie Anne	(United Kingdom of Great Britain and Ireland) Guernsey	The smack was wrecked on the Goodwin Sands, Kent. Her crew were rescued. She was on a voyage from Falmouth, Cornwall to Sheerness, Kent.

== 8 March ==
List of shipwrecks: 8 March 1859
Ship	State	Description
Adonis	Bremen	Illustration "The Wreck of the 'Adonis'" from Harper's Weekly, 1859. Bound from Newcastle, England, to New York City with a cargo of "124 grindstones, 600 lead ingots, 39 casks of ground flint, 100 casks of alkali, 501 casks of soda, 170 casks of powder, 130 casks of sodium carbonate, 200 casks of "V. red", and 500 kegs of C. soda", the 550-gross register ton full-rigged ship or barque (sources disagree) was wrecked at Long Branch, New Jersey, in a heavy fog. Her entire crew of 12 survived. She broke up in the surf on 18 March. Her wreck eventually sank in 25 feet (8 m) of water. Her wreck and that of SS Rusland – wrecked on top of Adonis's wreck in 1877 – are known as the "Dual Wrecks."
Cossack	(United Kingdom of Great Britain and Ireland) Guernsey	The brig ran aground on the Cant Sand, in the Thames Estuary and sank. Her crew were rescued by the smack Hannah (United Kingdom). Vesta was on a voyage from Guernsey to London.
Ellen Margaret	United Kingdom	The barque was driven ashore on Amrum, Duchy of Holstein. Her crew were rescued (29 March?). She was on a voyage from Hartlepool, County Durham to Hamburg. Ellen Margaret broke up the next day.
Gonsalve	France	The schooner was wrecked on the Doom Bar. Her seven crew were rescued by the Padstow Lifeboat Royal Albert (United Kingdom). Gonsalve was on a voyage from Nantes, Loire-Inférieure to Londonderry, United Kingdom.
Sandford	United Kingdom	The ship was wrecked at Mauritius.

== 9 March ==
List of shipwrecks: 9 March 1859
Ship	State	Description
Alfred	United Kingdom	The ship was wrecked off the Isle of Pines, Cuba. She was on a voyage from London to Jamaica.
Catharina	Kingdom of Hanover	The Emden-registered ship ran aground on the Anasen Gronde, in the North Sea. She was on a voyage from Emden to an English port. She had been refloated by 19 March.
Catharina	Kingdom of Hanover	The Carolinensiel-registered ship ran aground on the Anasen Gronde. She was still aground on 19 March.
Comet	United Kingdom	The whaler sank 4 nautical miles (7.4 km) off Bergen, Norway. Her crew were rescued. She was on a voyage from London to Spitzbergen, Norway.
Diana	Kingdom of Hanover	The ship ran aground on the Anasen Gronde. She was still aground on 19 March.
Elizabeth and Jane	United Kingdom	The ship was driven ashore and severely damaged at Sunderland, County Durham. Her crew were rescued. She was on a voyage from Dundee, Forfarshire to Sunderland
Frau Peta	Sweden	The ship sank off "Valon". She was on a voyage from Gothenburg to London. She was refloated on 5 May.
Johanne Christian	Netherlands	The koff was driven ashore and wrecked at "Batbill", Denmark with the loss of all hands. She was on a voyage from London to Karlskrona, Sweden.
Lord Mulgrave	United Kingdom	The barque struck rocks and sank off Stromness, Orkney Islands with the loss of five of her fourteen crew. She was on a voyage from South Shields, County Durham to New York, United States.
Sedgefield	United Kingdom	The brig ran aground on The Shingles, off the Isle of Wight. and was abandoned by her crew. She was on a voyage from Newcastle upon Tyne, Northumberland to Lisbon, Portugal. She was refloated with assistance from the pilot cutter Fox and taken in to Portsmouth, Hampshire.
Uncle Joe	United Kingdom	The ship ran aground on the Barrel Key. She was on a voyage from Cardiff, Glamorgan to New Orleans, Louisiana, United States. She was later refloated and completed her voyage, arriving at New Orleans on 9 April.
Wilhelmina	Prussia	The ship was driven ashore near Lemvig, Denmark with the loss of four of her crew. She was on a voyage from Memel to South Shields, County Durham.

== 10 March ==
List of shipwrecks: 10 March 1859
Ship	State	Description
Amanda	Stettin	The ship was wrecked on the Salesund, in the North Sea off the coast of Norway. She was on a voyage from Liverpool, Lancashire, United Kingdom to Stettin.
Henrietta	United Kingdom	The brig ran aground on the Margate Sand, off the coast of Kent. She was on a voyage from Hartlepool, County Durham to Arundel, Sussex. She was later refloated and resumed her voyage, but put in to Shoreham-by-Sea, Sussex in a leaky condition on 2 April.
Hotspur	United Kingdom	The sloop struck the Selkirk Rock, in the Irish Sea off Ravenglass, Cumberland and sank with the loss of all hands. She was on a voyage from Liverpool to Whitehaven, Cumberland.
Maria	United Kingdom	The ship ran aground and was damaged at North Berwick, Lothian. She was on a voyage from London to North Berwick. She was refloated and taken in to North Berwick for repairs.
Pallas	United Kingdom	The brig struck rocks at Cromer, Norfolk. She was on a voyage from South Shields, County Durham to London. She was refloated and towed in to Great Yarmouth, Norfolk.
Providentia	Denmark	The ship ran aground on the Calloo Sand, in the North Sea. She was on a voyage from Vlissingen, Zeeland, Netherlands to Leith, Lothian, United Kingdom. She was refloated and put back to Vlissingen in a leaky condition.
Tally-ho	United Kingdom	The schooner ran ashore on Black House Island, in Carlingford Bay.

== 11 March ==
List of shipwrecks: 11 March 1859
Ship	State	Description
Barbara	United Kingdom	The schooner was driven ashore in Deersound, Orkney Islands.
Caroline	United Kingdom	The schooner ran aground and was wrecked on the Northam Barrows, off the north coast of Devon. Her five crew were rescued by the Bideford Lifeboat Mermaid (United Kingdom).
Dicky Sam	United Kingdom	The ship was driven ashore on Holy Isle, in the Firth of Clyde. She was on a voyage from the Clyde to Bahia, Brazil. She was refloated and put back to the Clyde.
Edwin	United Kingdom	The collier, a brig, was wrecked on the Maplin Sand, in the North Sea off the coast of Essex. Her crew were rescued. She was on a voyage from Sunderland, County Durham to London.
Elizabeth	(United Kingdom of Great Britain and Ireland) Guernsey	The ship collided with the brig Hadding (Norway) in the English Channel off the coast of Devon and was abandoned. Her crew were rescued by Hadding. Elizabeth was on a voyage from Plymouth, Devon to Guernsey. She was subsequently towed in to Teignmouth, Devon in a derelict condition by some fishing boats.
Fleetwood	United Kingdom	The barque was driven ashore and wrecked 3 nautical miles (5.6 km) west of Carnsore Point, County Wexford. Her crew were rescued. She was on a voyage from Agrigento, Sicily to Glasgow, Renfrewshire.
Gustav	(Denmark) Duchy of Schleswig	The ship was driven ashore at Ringkøbing, Denmark with the loss of four of her five crew. She was on a voyage from Flensburg to an English port.
Gwanedd Francis	United Kingdom	The smack was abandoned in the Irish Sea 15 nautical miles (28 km) north west by north of the Walney Lighthouse, Lancashire. Her crew were rescued by a fishing smack. She was on a voyage from Chester, Cheshire to Barrow-in-Furness, Lancashire.

== 12 March ==
List of shipwrecks: 12 March 1859
Ship	State	Description
Achilles	Bremen	The full-rigged ship was driven ashore and wrecked in Sconsburg Creek, Shetland Islands, United Kingdom. Her crew were rescued. She was on a voyage from Bremen to New Orleans, Louisiana, United States.
Adonis	Bremen	The full-rigged ship was driven ashore 2 nautical miles (3.7 km) south of Long Branch, New Jersey, United States and became severely hogged. She was on a voyage from Newcastle upon Tyne, Northumberland, United Kingdom to New York, United States.
Clifton	United Kingdom	The schooner was wrecked on the South Tail, in the Bristol Channel off the coast of Devon. Her crew were rescued by the Bideford Lifeboat Mermaid (United Kingdom). Clifton was on a voyage from Cardiff, Glamorgan to Porto, Portugal.
Hope	United States	The ship was driven ashore north of Algeciras, Spain. She was on a voyage from Livorno, Grand Duchy of Tuscany to New York.
Hope	United Kingdom	The schooner was driven ashore at Netherton, Cheshire with the loss of all hands. She was on a voyage from Runcorn, Cheshire to Whitehaven, Cumberland.
Hudgill	United Kingdom	The brig ran aground in the Elbe.
Mary Jane	United Kingdom	The ship was driven ashore at Braystones, Cumberland.
Nouvelle Esperance	France	The ship was driven ashore and wrecked near Kidwelly, Carmarthenshire, United Kingdom with the loss of five of her ten crew. She was on a voyage from Swansea, Glamorgan, United Kingdom to Bordeaux, Gironde.
Promethus	Grand Duchy of Mecklenburg-Schwerin	The barque was wrecked on the Chincora Reefs. Her crew were rescued.
Schofield	United Kingdom	The ship struck a sunken wreck off Leman Sandbank, in the North Sea and foundered. Her crew were rescued. She was on a voyage from Hartlepool, County Durham to London.

== 13 March ==
List of shipwrecks: 13 March 1859
Ship	State	Description
Earn	United Kingdom	The schooner was wrecked on the Navestone Rock, off the coast of Northumberland. Her five crew survived. She was on a voyage from Sunderland, County Durham to Montrose, Forfarshire.
Messenger	United Kingdom	The ship was driven ashore at Holyhead, Anglesey. She was on a voyage from Cardiff, Glamorgan to Liverpool, Lancashire.
Nemesis	United Kingdom	The barque was driven ashore at Kilmore, County Wexford. She was on a voyage from Alexandria, Egypt to Belfast, County Antrim.
Robert and Betsey	United Kingdom	The ship was driven ashore at West Hartlepool, County Durham. She was refloated.
Stadtfeldt	Hamburg	The brig was driven ashore and wrecked in Carmarthen Bay with the loss of five of her ten crew. She was on a voyage from Laguna to Hamburg.
Superior	United Kingdom	The ship was driven onto the Boulmer Rocks, in the coast of Northumberland and was wrecked. She was on a voyage from Dundee, Forfarshire to Seaham, County Durham.

== 14 March ==
List of shipwrecks: 14 March 1859
Ship	State	Description
Amanda	Stettin	The brig was wrecked on the Jadder, in the North Sea. She was on a voyage from Liverpool, Lancashire, United Kingdom to Stettin.
Cinq Cœurs	France	The brig was driven ashore on Chesil Beach, Dorset, United Kingdom with the loss of all but two of her crew. She was on a voyage from Odesa to Falmouth, Cornwall, United Kingdom.
Fortuna	Denmark	The schooner was driven ashore south east of the mouth of the Rio Grande and was abandoned. She was on a voyage from Cádiz, Spain to the Rio Grande. She floated off and drifted out to sea, presumed subsequently foundered.
Lively	United Kingdom	The ship was driven ashore at Middleton, County Durham.
Mischief	United Kingdom	The schooner was driven ashore at Middleton.
Pintade	United Kingdom	The schooner sank in Whitsand Bay. Her crew were rescued. She was on a voyage from Saint-Malo, Ille-et-Vilaine, France to Liverpool, Lancashire.

== 15 March ==
List of shipwrecks: 15 March 1859
Ship	State	Description
Columbia	United Kingdom	The ship was abandoned in the Atlantic Ocean. Her crew were rescued by William Fairburn (United Kingdom). Columbia was on a voyage from Callao, Peru to Queenstown, County Cork.
Elizabeth	United Kingdom	The schooner was driven ashore and wrecked at Tynemouth, Northumberland. Her crew were rescued. She was on a voyage from Boston, Lincolnshire to Newcastle upon Tyne, Northumberland.
Frederick William	United Kingdom	The ship was wrecked on the Doom Bar. All five people on board were rescued by the Padstow Lifeboat. She was on a voyage from Newport, Monmouthshire to Ipswich, Suffolk.
Friends	United Kingdom	The ship was driven ashore and wrecked near Leith, Lothian.
George	United Kingdom	The schooner ran aground and was wrecked at North Shields, County Durham with the loss of all five crew. She was on a voyage form Middelburg, Zeeland, Netherlands to North Shields.
George IV	United Kingdom	The schooner was driven ashore near Waterford.
Gratitude	United Kingdom	The ship sprang a leak and was beached at Portmadoc, Caernarfonshire. She was on a voyage from the Clyde to Newport, Monmouthshire.
John	United Kingdom	The ship ran aground on the Holm Sand, in the North Sea off the coast of Suffolk. She was on a voyage from Newcastle upon Tyne to Neath, Glamorgan. She was refloated and taken in to Lowestoft, Suffolk in a leaky condition.
Lively	United Kingdom	The ship was driven ashore and damaged at Middleton, County Durham.
One	United Kingdom	The schooner was driven ashore on Goeree, Zeeland, Netherlands. Five crew were rescued.
Sir William Curtis	United Kingdom	The schooner was wrecked at Tynemouth. Her crew were rescued. She was on a voyage from Great Yarmouth, Norfolk to South Shields, County Durham.
Trieste	Trieste	The steamship was driven ashore on the Noordewal, off the coast of Zeeland.
Union	United Kingdom	The barque ran aground on the Longsand, in the North Sea off the coast of Essex. She was on a voyage from South Shields to Shoreham-by-Sea, Sussex She was refloated and assisted in to Harwich, Essex in a leaky condition.

== 16 March ==
List of shipwrecks: 16 March 1859
Ship	State	Description
Briseis	United Kingdom	The ship was abandoned in the Indian Ocean. Her crew were rescued by Royal Arthur (United Kingdom). Briseis was on a voyage from Bombay, India to London. She was subsequently taken in to Port Elizabeth, Cape Colony.
Britannia	United Kingdom	The brig ran aground and was damaged on the Herd Sand, in the North Sea off the coast of County Durham. She was on a voyage from Shoreham-by-Sea, Sussex to the River Tyne. She was refloated and completed her voyage.
Lizzie Scott	United Kingdom	The ship was damaged by fire at Melbourne, Victoria. She was on a voyage from Sunderland, County Durham to Melbourne.
Sela	United Kingdom	The brig was wrecked near Frederikshavn, Denmark.
St. Helena	United Kingdom	The full-rigged ship was driven ashore and wrecked at Dungarvan, County Waterford.

== 17 March ==
List of shipwrecks: 17 March 1859
Ship	State	Description
Active	United Kingdom	The lugger foundered in the North Sea 50 nautical miles (93 km) off Winterton-on-Sea, Norfolk.
Annie and Maria	United Kingdom	The ship was driven ashore and damaged at Black Point, Anglesey. She was on a voyage from Liverpool, Lancashire to Constantinople, Ottoman Empire. She was refloated the next day.
Betsey, Derwent, and Pilot	United Kingdom	The tug Derwent was towing the sloop Betsey and the ship Pilot when all three ran aground at Workington, Cumberland. Derwent and Betsey were refloated, and the latter was towed back to Workington. Derwent the assisted in the refloating of Pilot and took her in tow, but the rope broke and Pilot was driven ashore and wrecked. The ships were on a voyage from Workington to Liverpool.
Forrester	United Kingdom	The sloop sank in the Humber. Her three crew were rescued by Manchester (United Kingdom).
Marco Polo	United Kingdom	The brig foundered in the North Sea 25 nautical miles (46 km) off the coast of Norfolk with the loss of four of her eight crew. She was on a voyage from Grangemouth, Stirlingshire to Dunkirk, Nord, France.
Prince of Wales	United Kingdom	The steamship struck a rock off Chiloé Island, Chile and was wrecked. All on board survived. She was on a voyage from Chiloé Island to Valparaíso, Chile.
Sarah Dixon	United Kingdom	The full-rigged ship was wrecked on the Baraguay Shoal. She was on a voyage from Australia to Rangoon, Burma.

== 18 March ==
List of shipwrecks: 18 March 1859
Ship	State	Description
Harriet Ann	United Kingdom	The brig was wrecked on the north coast of Cuba. She was on a voyage from Navy Bay to Baltimore, Maryland, United States.
Hope	United Kingdom	The full-rigged ship ran aground and was severely damaged at Lindisfarne, Northumberland. She was on a voyage from Sunderland, County Durham to Port Dundas, Renfrewshire. She was refloated and towed in to Berwick upon Tweed, Northumberland for repairs.
Roberts	United Kingdom	The ship struck Paterson's Rock and foundered. Her crew were rescued.
Rosalie	United Kingdom	The ship was wrecked in the Maldive Islands. She was on a voyage from London to Kurrachee, India.

== 19 March ==
List of shipwrecks: 19 March 1859
Ship	State	Description
Volunteer	United Kingdom	The steamship was holed by ice and sank in the Arctic Ocean. Her crew were rescued by Arctic (United Kingdom. She was on a voyage from the River Tyne to Greenland.

== 20 March ==
List of shipwrecks: 20 March 1859
Ship	State	Description
Alert	United Kingdom	The whaler was lost on the coast of Greenland.
Ann and Maria	United Kingdom	The ship was driven ashore at Penmon, Anglesey. She was refloated and taken in to Beaumaris, Anglesey in a severely damaged condition.
Blue Jacket	United Kingdom	The schooner capsized and sank off Penmon with the loss of all but two of her crew. She was on a voyage from Liverpool, Lancashire to Bangor, Caernarfonshire. She was refloated on 23 January and taken in to Bangor.
Duke of Wellington	United Kingdom	The brig foundered in the North Sea off Kamperduin, North Holland, Netherlands. Her crew were rescued by The Brothers (United Kingdom). Duke of Wellington was on a voyage from Sunderland, County Durham to Rotterdam, South Holland, Netherlands.
Emily	United Kingdom	The ship was driven ashore at Walmer Castle, Kent. She was on a voyage from Middlesbrough, Yorkshire to Torquay, Devon. She was refloated.
Empress of India	United Kingdom	The whaler, a steamship was wrecked on the coast of Greenland.
Equator	Netherlands	The barque was destroyed by fire at Liverpool with the loss of a crew member. She was on a voyage from Liverpool to Batavia, Netherlands East Indies. The wreck was refloated on 2 April.
George	United Kingdom	The brig ran aground on the Mittelgrunde, off the coast of Denmark. She was on a voyage from Hartlepool, County Durham to Pillau, Prussia. She was refloated and resumed her voyage in a leaky condition.
Kate	United Kingdom	The whaler was severely damaged on the coast of Greenland.
Melinka	United Kingdom	The whaler was lost on the coast of Greenland.

== 21 March ==
List of shipwrecks: 21 March 1859
Ship	State	Description
Anacreon	United Kingdom	The ship was wrecked on Scharhörn. Her crew were rescued.
Ark	United Kingdom	The ship ran aground at Dundalk, County Louth. She was on a voyage from Taganrog, Russia to Dundalk.
Hussar	United Kingdom	The brig was abandoned in the South Atlantic. Her crew were rescued by Edouard Elise (France). Hussar was on a voyage from Buenos Aires, Argentina to Falmouth, Cornwall.
Jules	France	The barque ran aground and sank in the River Plate with the loss of all hands. She was on a voyage from Buenos Aires to Havre de Grâce, Seine-Inférieure.
Nelly	United Kingdom	The ship ran aground on the Longsand, in the North Sea off the coast of Essex. She was on a voyage from Libava, Courland Governorate to "Tregnier", France. She was refloated but consequently foundered off Walton-on-the-Naze, Essex. Her crew were rescued.
Newcastle	United Kingdom	The ship drove ashore on Tino, Kingdom of Sardinia. She was on a voyage from the River Tyne to Constantinople, Ottoman Empire. She was refloated on 23 March.

== 22 March ==
List of shipwrecks: 22 March 1859
Ship	State	Description
Grace Darling	United Kingdom	The ship struck The Platters and was damaged. She was on a voyage from Llanelly, Glamorgan to Londonderry. She put in to Holyhead, Anglesey in a leaky condition.

== 23 March ==
List of shipwrecks: 23 March 1859
Ship	State	Description
Cape of Good Hope	United Kingdom	The steamship collided with the steamship Nemesis (United Kingdom) in the Hooghly River and was wrecked.
Henry Hastings	United Kingdom	The ship was driven ashore in Castenden Bay, County Antrim. Her crew were rescued.
Jane Brown	United Kingdom	The ship was driven ashore and wrecked at Dunure, Ayrshire. She was on her maiden voyage, from Ayr to Drogheda, County Louth.
Patria	Sweden	The ship was wrecked near "Carabournou", Ottoman Empire. She was on a voyage from Sevastopol, Russia to Hull, Yorkshire, United Kingdom.

== 24 March ==
List of shipwrecks: 24 March 1859
Ship	State	Description
Albert	France	The full-rigged ship was driven ashore at Algeciras, Spain. She was on a voyage from Marseille, Bouches-du-Rhône to Cayenne, French Guiana.
Danube	United Kingdom	The barque departed from Havana, Cuba for Cowes, Isle of Wight. No further trace, presumed foundered with the loss of all hands.
Dolphin	United Kingdom	The Mersey Flat collided with Ethiope (United Kingdom) in Liverpool Bay and sank. She was towed in to Liverpool, Lancashire in a capsized condition.

== 25 March ==
List of shipwrecks: 25 March 1859
Ship	State	Description
Commodore	United Kingdom	The ship ran aground in the River Fal.

== 26 March ==
List of shipwrecks: 26 March 1859
Ship	State	Description
Istamboul	United Kingdom	The brig ran aground on the Ak Bouroun Reef, in the Black Sea.
Sally	United Kingdom	The barque was wrecked at Vizagapatam, India.

== 27 March ==
List of shipwrecks: 27 March 1859
Ship	State	Description
George Potts	United Kingdom	The brig ran aground at South Shields, County Durham. She was on a voyage from South Shields to Messina, Sicily. She was refloated and resumed her voyage, but put in to The Downs in a leaky condition the next day.
Hertha	Denmark	The ship was abandoned off Hanstholmen. She was on a voyage from Nykøbing to London, United Kingdom.

== 28 March ==
List of shipwrecks: 28 March 1859
Ship	State	Description
Blackstone	United Kingdom	The ship foundered in the North Sea. Her crew were rescued by the steamship Lady Alice Lambton United Kingdom). Blackstone was on a voyage from South Shields, County Durham to Harburg.
David Gibson, and Nathaniel Holmes	United States	The steamships collided in the Ohio River. Both vessels sank. David Gibson was on a voyage from New Orleans, Louisiana to Cincinnati, Ohio. Forty-three of her 86 passengers were lost. Nathaniel Holmes was on a voyage from Pittsburgh, Pennsylvania to Saint Louis, Missouri. Fifteen or twenty of her 150 passengers were lost.
Java	United Kingdom	The ship was driven ashore on False Emmanuel Head, Northumberland. She was on a voyage from South Shields, County Durham to Grangemouth, Stirlingshire. She was refloated and taken in to Berwick upon Tweed, Northumberland for repairs.
John Wade	United States	The medium clipper struck an uncharted rock in the Gulf of Siam and was a total loss. Her crew survived. She was on a voyage from Bangkok, Siam to Hong Kong.
Milo	United Kingdom	The brig foundered in the Bristol Channel 20 nautical miles (37 km) off Lundy Island, Devon. Her crew were rescued. she was on a voyage from Cardiff, Glamorgan to Cherbourg, Charente-Inférieure, France.

== 29 March ==
List of shipwrecks: 29 March 1859
Ship	State	Description
Ellen Margaret	United Kingdom	The barque was driven ashore and wrecked on Amrum, Duchy of Holstein. Her crew were rescued. She was on a voyage from Hartlepool, County Durham to Hamburg.
Mrytle	United Kingdom	The schooner was driven ashore on the Boichead Rocks, on the coast of Aberdeenshire. She was on a voyage from Sunderland, County Durham to Fraserburgh, Aberdeenshire. She was refloated and taken in to Fraserburgh in a severely damaged condition.
North Sea	United Kingdom	The steamship was driven ashore at Holmen, Copenhagen. All on board were rescued. She was on a voyage from Hull, Yorkshire to Gothenburg, Sweden. She was abandoned on 28 May and broke in two after 16 June.

== 30 March ==
List of shipwrecks: 30 March 1859
Ship	State	Description
Brothers, and Vulcan	United Kingdom	The schooners collided at Berehaven, County Cork and were both driven ashore. Brothers was wrecked, Vulcan was refloated and towed in to Berehaven.
Ellen	United Kingdom	The schooner ran aground at North Shields, County Durham. She was on a voyage from Nantes, Loire-Inférieure, France to the Firth of Forth.
Jane	United Kingdom	The brig was run into by the steamship Prince of Wales United Kingdom and was beached in the River Lagan. She was on a voyage from Ayr to Belfast, County Antrim.
Robert and Margaret	United Kingdom	The ship ran aground at Sunderland, County Durham. She was refloated and taken in to Sunderland.
Sarah	United Kingdom	The schooner sank off Rhyl, Denbighshire. Her crew were rescued. She subsequently floated off.
Vulcan	United Kingdom	The ship was wrecked at Wyk auf Föhr, Duchy of Holstein. Her crew were rescued.

== 31 March ==
List of shipwrecks: 31 March 1859
Ship	State	Description
Camden	United Kingdom	The schooner collided with Governor Baron de Vicere (Belgium) and was beached at Woodside, Cheshire. She was on a voyage from Liverpool, Lancashire to Cork. She was refloated and taken in to Birkenhead, Cheshire.
I. M.	United Kingdom	The smack was driven ashore and wrecked at Sutton-on-Sea, Lincolnshire. Her crew were rescued by a lifeboat. She was on a voyage from Dartmouth, Devon to Hull, Yorkshire.

== Unknown date ==
List of shipwrecks: Unknown date in March 1859
Ship	State	Description
Boulenir	France	The brig ran aground on the Canzales Rocks, at the mouth of the Nunez River before 6 March. She was refloated but was consequently condemned.
Calypso	United Kingdom	The ship was wrecked near Lysekil, Sweden with the loss of all hands. She was on a voyage from the River Tyne to Swinemünde, Kingdom of Prussia.
Chase	United Kingdom	The ship foundered in Tees Bay. She was on a voyage from Whitby, Yorkshire to South Shields, County Durham.
Dalmato	Grand Duchy of Tuscany	The barque was wrecked near Burgas, Ottoman Empire on or before 2 March. She was on a voyage from London, United Kingdom to Odesa.
Eclipse	(United Kingdom of Great Britain and Ireland) Jersey	The cutter foundered in the English Channel with the loss of all six crew.
Emily	United Kingdom	The barque was lost near Belize City, British Honduras before 17 March. She was on a voyage from Liverpool, Lancashire to Belize City.
Etherlinde	United States	The fishing schooner was lost on Ragged Island. Crew saved.
Flora	United Kingdom	The smack sank at Gigha, Argyllshire before 22 March. Her crew were rescued.
Fritz	Norway	The brig sprang a leak and was abandoned in the North Sea. Her crew were rescued by Juno (Norway). Fritz was on a voyage from Arendal to Newcastle upon Tyne, Northumberland, United Kingdom.
Gemini	(United Kingdom of Great Britain and Ireland) New South Wales	The steamship sank in the Murray River before 26 March.
Grey Oak	United States	The ship foundered in the Atlantic Ocean. Her crew were rescued by City of Washington (United Kingdom).
Hebe	Sweden	The barque was wrecked on Psara, Greece before 5 March.
Hebe	United Kingdom	The brig was wrecked at Derbyhaven, Isle of Man. She was on a voyage from Harrington, Cumberland to Dublin.
Hope	United Kingdom	The ship was abandoned on the Dogger Bank before 25 February. Her crew were rescued by Pfeil (Prussia). Hope was on a voyage from Hartlepool, County Durham to Hamburg.
Jessie Beazley	United Kingdom	The ship foundered in Carmarthen Bay between 20 and 31 March. She was on a voyage from Liverpool to Hong Kong.
John George	United Kingdom	The barque ran aground on the Shipwash Sand, in the North Sea off the coast of Suffolk.
Leviathan	Norway	The brig was abandoned in the North Sea. Her crew were rescued by Eagle (United Kingdom). Leviathan was on a voyage from Arendal to Leith, Lothian, United Kingdom.
Nelly	United Kingdom	The ship ran aground on the Longsand, in the North Sea off the coast of Essex. She was refloated and beached at The Naze. Subsequently towed in to Harwich in a wrecked condition.
Old Rapp	United Kingdom	The ship foundered off Heligoland with the loss of all hands.
Pizarro	Chilean Navy	The brigantine disappeared in the Southern Ocean off Cape Horn sometime between 7 and 9 March.
Royal Arthur	United Kingdom	The ship was driven ashore at Cape Recife, Cape Colony between 16 and 25 March. She was refloated and put in to Algoa Bay in a leaky condition.
Sarah	United Kingdom	The ship was abandoned in the North Sea off the mouth of the Humber. She was on a voyage from Lowestoft, Suffolk to Middlesbrough, Yorkshire.
Seraphina	United Kingdom	The ship was driven ashore at Pernambuco, Brazil. She had been refloated by 17 March.
Tarragon	United Kingdom	The ship was lost "near the Tillen". Her crew were rescued. She was on a voyage from Newcastle upon Tyne to Hamburg.
William	United Kingdom	The schooner departed from Blyth, Northumberland for Copenhagen, Denmark. No further trace, presumed foundered with the loss of all six crew.
Young America	United States	The fishing schooner was lost on the Georges Bank. Lost with all eight crew.
