= List of shipwrecks in November 1866 =

The list of shipwrecks in November 1866 includes ships sunk, foundered, grounded, or otherwise lost during November 1866.

== 1 November ==
List of shipwrecks: 1 November 1866
Ship	State	Description
Adriana	United Kingdom	The ship sprang a leak and was run ashore at Stanley, Falkland Islands. She was on a voyage from the Chincha Islands, Peru to Queenstown, County Cork. She was refloated, repaired and resumed her voyage.
Castle Eden	United Kingdom	The brig was driven ashore and damaged 24 nautical miles (44 km) from Memel, Prussia. She was refloated on 16 May 1867 and taken in to Memel for repairs.
Catherine and Elizabeth	United Kingdom	The barque was driven ashore at Whitburn, County Durham. Her crew were rescued by the Whitburn Lifeboat.
Constance and Amelia	United Kingdom	The barque was wrecked. Her crew were rescued. She was on a voyage from Liverpool, Lancashire to Rosario, Argentina.
Isabel Forbes	United Kingdom	The schooner struck rocks at Newton, Northumberland. She was refloated and taken in to Lindisfarne, Northumberland in a leaky condition.
Margaret and Jane	United Kingdom	The brig was driven ashore and wrecked at Whitburn. Her crew were rescued by the Whitburn Lifeboat.
Mary Ann	United Kingdom	The schooner ran aground in The Needles, Isle of Wight. She was on a voyage from Sunderland, County Durham to Teignmouth, Devon. She was refloated and taken in to Yarmouth, Isle of Wight.
Sarah Ann	United Kingdom	The schooner sprang a leak and sank in the English Channel off The Needles. Her crew were rescued. She was on a voyage from Teignmouth to the River Wear.
Strongbow	United Kingdom	The ship was sighted in the Indian Ocean whilst on a voyage from Calcutta, India to London. No further trace, presumed foundered with the loss of all hands.

== 2 November ==
List of shipwrecks: 2 November 1866
Ship	State	Description
True Briton	United Kingdom	The brig sank off Schouwen, Zeeland, Netherlands. Her crew were rescued by Camilla (Flag unknown). True Briton was on a voyage from Dordrecht, South Holland, Netherlands to South Shields, County Durham.

== 3 November ==
List of shipwrecks: 3 November 1866
Ship	State	Description
Charlemagne	United Kingdom	The ship ran aground in the Hooghly River. She was on a voyage from London to Calcutta, India. She was refloated and taken in to Calcutta in a severely leaky condition.
Dublin	United Kingdom	The whaler was destroyed by fire at "Niatellic", in the Cumberland Sound. Her crew were rescued.
Iron King, and Syren	United Kingdom	The tug Iron King collided with the ferry Syren in the River Mersey. Both vessels sank. Their crews and the passengers from Syren were rescued by cutters from the training ship Indefatigable (United Kingdom).
Lizzie	(United Kingdom of Great Britain and Ireland) New Zealand	The barque was wrecked on a reef near Chatham Island while en route from Wellington to Callao. The crew were rescued by the government steamship St Kilda ( (United Kingdom of Great Britain and Ireland) New Zealand).

== 4 November ==
List of shipwrecks: 4 November 1866
Ship	State	Description
Iron King, and Syren	United Kingdom	The tug Iron King collided with the Mersey Ferry Syren in the River Mersey. Both vessels sank. All on board both vessels were rescued by HMS Indefatigable (Royal Navy).
Millicent	United Kingdom	The brig foundered off Donaghadee, County Down. Her crew were rescued. She was on a voyage from the Clyde to Newport, Monmouthshire.
Ross	United Kingdom	The ship foundered off the Haisborough Sands, in the North Sea off the coast of Norfolk. Her crew were rescued by the steamship Fatfield (United Kingdom). Ross was on a voyage from Hartlepool, County Durham to Dieppe, Seine-Inférieure, France.

== 5 November ==
List of shipwrecks: 5 November 1866
Ship	State	Description
John o'Groat	United Kingdom	The schooner was sighted off Fraserburgh, Aberdeenshire whilst on a voyage from the River Tyne to Wick, Caithness. No furthert trace, presumed foundered with the loss of all five crew.
Juno	Sweden	The brig foundered. Her crew were rescued by Black Friar (United Kingdom).
Island Home	United States	The ship capsized in the Atlantic Ocean. Her crew were rescued by Ortilius (Belgium). Island Home was on a voyage from New York to Richmond, Virginia and the Rio Grande.

== 6 November ==
List of shipwrecks: 6 November 1866
Ship	State	Description
Brill	United Kingdom	The brig was sighted off Swanage, Dorset whilst on a voyage from South Shields, County Durham to Newport, Rhode Island, United States. No further trace, presumed foundered with the loss of all hands.
Margaret and Eliza	United Kingdom	The schooner sprang a leak and was abandoned in the North Sea. She was on a voyage from Cromarty to Leith, Lothian.
Martha	Prussia	The ship collided with another vessel and sank at Arendal, Norway with the loss of a crew member. She was on a voyage from Nykøbing, Denmark to Stockton-on-Tees, County Durham, United Kingdom.

== 7 November ==
List of shipwrecks: 7 November 1866
Ship	State	Description
Countess of Durham	United Kingdom	The schooner struck the Swadman Sand. She was on a voyage from Southampton, Hampshire to Portsoy, Aberdeenshire. She was refloated and assisted in to North Sunderland, County Durham in a severely leaky condition.
Johanne	Denmark	The ship was driven ashore at "Stevenshood" with the loss of two lives. She was on a voyage from Hull, Yorkshire, United Kingdom to Horsens.
Undine	United Kingdom	The ship was wrecked at Cap Arkona, Rügen, Prussia. Her crew were rescued. She was on a voyage from Sunderland, County Durham to a Baltic port.

== 8 November ==
List of shipwrecks: 8 November 1866
Ship	State	Description
Anna	Denmark	The ship was driven ashore and wrecked on Sylt, Duchy of Holstein. Her crew were rescued. She was on a voyage from Hartlepool, County Durham, United Kingdom to Fanø.
Blue Bell	United Kingdom	The ship was sighted whilst on a voyage from Londonderry to Glasgow, Renfrewshire. No further trace, presumed foundered with the loss of all hands.
Curlew	United Kingdom	The sloop ran aground on the Goswick Sand Ridge, in the North Sea off the coast of Northumberland and was wrecked. She was on a voyage from Arbroath, Forfarshire to Newcastle upon Tyne, Northumberland.
Dorothea	Italy	The ship sank in Galway Bay. Her crew survived. She was on a voyage from Odesa, Russia to Galway, United Kingdom.
Emerald	United Kingdom	The ship sank near Viana do Castelo, Portugal. Her crew were rescued. She was on a voyage from Newcastle upon Tyne to Huelva, Spain.
Fetteressa Castle	United Kingdom	The sloop foundered in the North Sea off the Farne Islands, Northumberland. Her crew were rescued by the schooner May Flower (United Kingdom). Fetteressa Castle was on a voyage from Leith, Lothian to the River Tyne.
James	United Kingdom	The ship was abandoned in the North Sea off the coast of Essex. Her crew were rescued by the barque Wilhelmina (Prussia). James was on a voyage from Colchester, Essex to London.
Star	United Kingdom	The schooner ran aground off Hunstanton, Norfolk. She was on a voyage from Hunstanton to Seaham, County Durham. She was refloated but drove ashore.
Tennant	United Kingdom	The ship was run into and sunk by the brig Vesta ( Grand Duchy of Mecklenburg-Schwerin) off St. Helen's, Isle of Wight with the loss of a crew member.
Unnamed	Flag unknown	A barque was run down and sunk at the mouth of the River Thames by the steamship Tanfield (United Kingdom).

== 9 November ==
List of shipwrecks: 9 November 1866
Ship	State	Description
Ajax	United Kingdom	The ship was driven ashore north of Pillau, Prussia. Her crew were rescued. She was on a voyage from London to Königsberg, Prussia.
Commodore	United Kingdom	The ship was driven ashore and wrecked on the coast of Pembrokeshire.
Ernestine Seydel	Prussia	The barque ran aground on the Middelgrunden, in the Baltic Sea. She was on a voyage from Hartlepool, County Durham, United Kingdom to Swinemünde. She was refloated the next day.
Excelsior	United Kingdom	The ship was driven ashore at Garrucha, Spain.
Fox	United Kingdom	The ship sank in the Bristol Channel. She was on a voyage from Swansea, Glamorgan to Bridgwater, Somerset.
Hope	United Kingdom	The ship was wrecked in Mill Bay, Pembrokeshire with the loss of two of her crew.
King of the Forest	United Kingdom	The ship was wrecked in Mill Bay. Her crew were rescued. She was on a voyage from Cardiff, Glamorgan to Liverpool, Lancashire.
Marchioness of Bute	United Kingdom	The ship was destroyed by fire off the Isle of Wight. Her crew were rescued by a tug. She was on a voyage from Sunderland, County Durham to Poole, Dorset#.
Neptune	Denmark	The barque ran aground at Copenhagen. She was on a voyage from Newcastle upon Tyne, Northumberland, United Kingdom to Copenhagen.
Princeton	United Kingdom	The barque sprang a leak and foundered off Cape de Gatt, Spain. Her crew were rescued by the steamship Smyrna (United Kingdom). Princeton was on a voyage from South Shields, County Durham to Alexandria, Egypt.
Three unnamed vessels	United Kingdom	The ships were driven ashore and wrecked on the coast of Pembrokeshire. One ship was lost with all hands.

== 10 November ==
List of shipwrecks: 10 November 1866
Ship	State	Description
Argus	United Kingdom	The schooner was wrecked at Clogherhead, County Louth. Her crew were rescued. She was on a voyage from Runcorn, Cheshire to Newry, County Antrim.
Fame	United Kingdom	The ship ran aground on the Tuskar Rock and sank. Her crew survived.
John Hicks	United Kingdom	The schooner was run down and sunk in the English Channel by American Congress (United States) with the loss of five of her six crew. She was on a voyage from Fowey, Cornwall to Leith, Lothian.
Lowestoft Merchant	United Kingdom	The schooner collided with the schooner Dannebrog (Denmark) and was abandoned in the North Sea off the coast of County Durham. Her crew were rescued by Dannperg. Lowestoft Merchant was on a voyage from King's Lynn, Norfolk to Sunderland, County Durham. She was towed in to Sunderland in a derelict condition the next day by the tug Shannon (United Kingdom).
Thomas	United Kingdom	The schooner was driven ashore near Clogherhead. Her crew were rescued.
Thomas Abram	United Kingdom	The ship was driven ashore at Dundalk, County Louth. Her crew were rescued. She was on a voyage from Runcorn, Cheshire to Newry, County Antrim.
Tyne	United Kingdom	The brig was lost near Öregrund, Sweden. Her crew were rescued. She was on a voyage from Gävle, Sweden to London.
Whitburn	United Kingdom	The ship was wrecked at Redcar, Yorkshire. Her crew were rescued. She was on a voyage from London to Middlesbrough, Yorkshire.

== 11 November ==
List of shipwrecks: 11 November 1866
Ship	State	Description
Admiral Collingwood	United Kingdom	The ship sank in the River Medway at Chatham, Kent. She was on a voyage from Hartlepool, County Durham to Rochester, Kent.
Ceres	United Kingdom	The steamship was wrecked at Carnsore, County Wexford with loss of 36 of the 59 people on board. She was on a voyage from London to Dublin.
Elizabeth Jenkins	(United Kingdom of Great Britain and Ireland) British North America	The barque collided with the full-rigged ship Agra (United Kingdom) and sank in the English Channel 4 nautical miles (7.4 km) off the Owers Lightship ( Trinity House) with the loss of ten of the seventeen people on board. Survivors were rescued by Agra. Elizabeth Jenkins was on a voyage from London to Boston, Massachusetts, United States.
Franc Pritchard	France	The schooner was driven ashore in Kingsgate Bay. She was on a voyage from Dunkirk, Nord to L'Orient, Morbihan.
Friends	United Kingdom	The ship was driven ashore at Aberdeen. Her crew were rescued. she was on a voyage from Limekilns, Fife to Charlestown, Cornwall. She was refloated on 22 November and towed in to Aberdeen.
Hannah Andrews	United Kingdom	The brig was driven ashore in Sandown Bay. She was on a voyage from Dieppe, Seine-Inférieure, France to Swansea, Glamorgan. She was refloated on 22 November and taken in to Cowes, Isle of Wight.
King of the Forest	United Kingdom	The ship was wrecked in Mill Bay. She was on a voyage from Cardiff, Glamorgan to the River Mersey.
L'Aigle	France	The lugger was wrecked on the Cross Sand, in the North Sea off the coast of Norfolk, United Kingdom with the loss of all 22 crew.
Rainbow	United Kingdom	The ship was driven ashore and wrecked on Anholt.
Souvenir	(United Kingdom of Great Britain and Ireland) Jersey	The brigantine collided with the schooner Florence (United Kingdom) and sank off Margate, Kent with the loss of four of her nine crew. Survivors were rescued by Florence and the fishing vessel Pilgrim (United Kingdom). Souvenir was on a voyage from Guernsey, Channel Islands to London.

== 12 November ==
List of shipwrecks: 12 November 1866
Ship	State	Description
Antenore	United Kingdom	The ship departed from Constantinople, Ottoman Empire for a British port. No further trace, presumed foundered with the loss of all hands.
Arachne	United Kingdom	The East Indiaman was abandoned in the Atlantic Ocean (10°12′N 23°20′W). Her crew were rescued by Keldhead (United Kingdom). Arachne was on a voyage from Calcutta, India to Liverpool, Lancashire.
Brothers	United Kingdom	The ship sank at Barrow in Furness, Lancashire.
Collingwood	United Kingdom	The schooner struck a submerged object and sank in the River Medway at Chatham, Kent. Her crew were rescued by a tug.
Fetteressa Castle	United Kingdom	The ship foundered off the Farne Islands, Northumberland. Her crew survived. She was on a voyage from Leith, Lothian to South Shields, County Durham.
Grenada	United Kingdom	The barque caught fire at Plymouth, Devon and was scuttled.
Henriette	Prussia	The ship was driven ashore near "Alum", Denmark. Her crew were rescued. She was on a voyage from Geestemünde to Newcastle upon Tyne, Northumberland.
Hope	United Kingdom	The ship was lost at Milford Haven, Pembrokeshire.
Isabel	United Kingdom	The schooner was driven ashore at St. Ann's Head, Pembrokeshire, She was on a voyage from Neath, Glamorgan to Plymouth, Devon.
Pallion	United Kingdom	The ship ran aground at Kastrup, Denmark. She was on a voyage from Kronstadt, Russia to a British port. She was refloated and resumed her voyage.
Tambo	(United Kingdom of Great Britain and Ireland) New Zealand	The schooner was lost after becoming stuck on a bar at the mouth of the Hokitika River. After failed attempts to free her, the crew abandoned ship. Shortly after this, part of the sandbar collapsed, and the unmanned ship was carried into the surf where she foundered.
Widgeon	United Kingdom	The ship ran aground at Kastrup. She was on a voyage from Kronstadt to a British port. She was refloated and resumed her voyage.

== 13 November ==
List of shipwrecks: 13 November 1866
Ship	State	Description
Alonzo	United Kingdom	The ship was driven ashore 20 nautical miles (37 km) north of Pillau, Prussia. Her crew were rescued. She was on a voyage from Danzig to London.
Bonita	United Kingdom	The ship departed from Old Calabar, Africa for a British port. No further trace, presumed foundered with the loss of all hands.
Camilla	United Kingdom	The steamship was wrecked with the loss of all hands. She was on a voyage from Liverpool, Lancashire to Waterford.
Henrietta	United Kingdom	The schooner was driven ashore at "Aalum", Denmark. Her crew were rescued. She was on a voyage from Geestemünde, Prussia to Newcastle upon Tyne, Northumberland.
Jane and Ann	United Kingdom	The brig ran aground off Borkum, Prussia. She was on a voyage from Altona to Middlesbrough, Yorkshire. She was refloated and put in to Cuxhaven in a severely leaky condition.
Mary Ellen	United Kingdom	The ship was driven ashore near "Bull Harbour". She was on a voyage from Prince Edward Island, British North America to Liverpool.

== 14 November ==
List of shipwrecks: 14 November 1866
Ship	State	Description
Belhaven	United Kingdom	The schooner was driven ashore at Eyemouth, Berwickshire. She was on a voyage from Ipswich, Suffolk to Portsoy, Aberdeenshire. She was refloated and taken in to Berwick upon Tweed, Northumberland in a severely leaky condition.
British Lion	United Kingdom	The ship was driven ashore at Grassendale, Lancashire.
Camilla	United Kingdom	The brig was wrecked on the Minatitlán Reef.
Caractacus	United States	The ship was wrecked in the Magdalen Islands, Nova Scotia, British North America. Her crew were rescued. She was on a voyage from Miramichi, New Brunswick, British North America to Liverpool, Lancashire, United Kingdom. The wreck was thought to be intentional.
Christian	United Kingdom	The ship was driven ashore near Llanelly, Glamorgan.
Comet	United Kingdom	The schooner ran aground on the Kentish Knock. She was refloated with assistance.
Gipsey Queen	United Kingdom	The ship was driven ashore near Garelochhead, Argyllshire.
Isabella	United Kingdom	The ship capsized in the North Sea off Texel, North Holland, Netherlands. Her crew were rescued the next day by the smack Meteor (United Kingdom). Isabella was on a voyage from Boulogne, Pas-de-Calais, France to Ipswich.
James Seward	United States	The schooner was lost off Rockland, Maine. Crew saved.
Mineral	United Kingdom	The schooner was wrecked in the Victoria Channel. She was on a voyage from Greenhithe, Kent to Runcorn, Cheshire.
Olga	United Kingdom	The steamship ran aground in the Zuyder Zee. She was on a voyage from Harlingen, Friesland, Netherlands to London. She was refloated with the assistance of the tug Magnet (Netherlands) and resumed her voyage.
Salem	United Kingdom	The ship was wrecked on Rodrigues. She was on a voyage from Bassein, India to Falmouth, Cornwall.
Wilberforce	United Kingdom	The brig foundered in the North Sea 12 nautical miles (22 km) east of the Galloper Sands with the loss of all hands. She was on a voyage from Sunderland, County Durham to Dunkirk, Nord, France.

== 15 November ==
List of shipwrecks: 15 November 1866
Ship	State	Description
Bullygar	United Kingdom	The tender was driven ashore in the Cumberland Strait. Her crew were rescued.
Camilla	United Kingdom	The ship was wrecked on the Minatitlan Reef.
Cupid	United Kingdom	The ship was driven ashore at Bacton, Norfolk. Her crew were rescued. She was on a voyage from Colchester, Essex to Goole, Yorkshire.
Dublin	United Kingdom	The ship was destroyed by fire in the Cumberland Strait. Her crew were rescued.
Friends	United Kingdom	The ship was driven ashore at Saltfleet, Lincolnshire. She was on a voyage from London to Sunderland, County Durham. She was refloated with assistance and resumed her voyage.
Inconstant	United Kingdom	The brig struck the pier and sank at Dunkirk, Nord. She was on a voyage from Newcastle upon Tyne, Northumberland to Dunkirk. She was refloated on 22 November.
Jane	United Kingdom	The brig was driven ashore at Bridlington, Yorkshire. Her seven crew were resched. She was on a voyage from Sunderland to Bridlington.
John and Jane	United Kingdom	The brig ran aground on the Maplin Sand, in the North Sea off the coast of Essex.
Lancaster	United Kingdom	The brig was driven ashore at Bridlington. Her three crew were rescued. She was on a voyage from Rochester, Kent to Bridlington. She was refloated on 23 November and taken in to Bridlington in a severely damaged condition.
Manchester	United Kingdom	The ship was severely damaged at Bridlington.
Maria Hardy	United Kingdom	The ship foundered off Aldeburgh, Suffolk. Her six crew survived. She was on a voyage from South Shields, County Durham to Fécamp, Seine-Inférieure.
Pomona	United Kingdom	The ship foundered off Bacton. Her crew were rescued.
Staghound	United Kingdom	The ship was wrecked on the Mellum Sands, in the North Sea. Her crew were rescued. She was on a voyage from Patras, Greece to Bremen.
Thomas	United Kingdom	The sloop was driven ashore at Happisburgh, Norfolk with the loss of all hands. She was on a voyage from Ipswich, Suffolk to Goole, Yorkshire.
Uva	United Kingdom	The brig foundered in the English Channel 2 nautical miles (3.7 km) off Saint-Valery-sur-Somme, Somme, France with the loss of all six crew. She was on a voyage from the River Tyne to Havre de Grâce, Seine-Inférieure.
Victory	United Kingdom	The schooner was driven ashore at Bridlington. Her five crew were rescued. She was on a voyage from Colchester to Seaham, County Durham. She was refloated.

== 16 November ==
List of shipwrecks: 16 November 1866
Ship	State	Description
Amazon	France	The ship was driven ashore and wrecked at Sea Palling, Norfolk, United Kingdom. Her crew were rescued by the Coastguard using rocket apparatus. She was on a voyage from Dunkirk, Nord to Hartlepool, County Durham, United Kingdom.
Blossom	United Kingdom	The schooner was driven ashore at South Shields, County Durham. Her three crew were rescued by rocket apparatus. She was on a voyage from Inverness to the River Tyne. She was later refloated and taken in to South Shields.
Brilliant	United Kingdom	The ship was driven ashore at Dieppe, Seine-Inférieure. She was on a voyage from West Hartlepool, County Durham to Dieppe. She was refloated with the assistance of a tug and taken in to Dieppe.
Carl XV	Norway	The barque was wrecked at Alexandria, Egypt. Her crew were rescued. She was on a voyage from South Shields, County Durham to Alexandria.
Childwickbury	United Kingdom	The ship was wrecked at Kinsale, County Cork. Her 28 crew were rescued. She was on a voyage from Liverpool, Lancashire to Callao, Peru.
Delight	United Kingdom	The ship ran aground on the Foreness Rock, Margate, Kent. Her crew were rescued.
Earl de Grey	United Kingdom	The steamship was wrecked on the North Pipe Sand, in the North Sea between the mouths of the Elbe and Eider. Her crew were rescued. She was on a voyage from Kronstadt, Russia to London.
Harmonie	United Kingdom	The ship was abandoned off Naxos, Greece. Her crew survived. She was on a voyage from Nicolaieff, Russia to a British port.
New Friendship	United Kingdom	The sloop sprang a leak and was beached at Happisburgh, Norfolk. Her crew were rescued by the Coastguard using rocket apparatus. She was on a voyage from South Benfleet, Essex to Goole, Yorkshire.
Pilgrim	Norway	The barque was wrecked off Juist, Prussia. Her crew were rescued by the steamship Sultana (United Kingdom).
Ravendale	United Kingdom	The full-rigged ship was destroyed by fire in the Atlantic Ocean (47°48′N 6°10′W). Seven of her fourteen crew were reported missing, the remainder were rescued by the steamship Alice (United Kingdom). Ravendale was on a voyage from Cape Agulhas, Cape Colony to Newcastle upon Tyne, Northumberland.
Richard and Sarah	United Kingdom	The brig was driven ashore and wrecked near Hartlepool. She was on a voyage from Sunderland to Hartlepool.
Scotia	United Kingdom	The steamship was beached at North Shields, Northumberland. She was on a voyage from the River Tyne to Grangemouth, Stirlingshire. Scotia was later refloated and taken in to North Shields.
Sovereign	United Kingdom	The barque was driven ashore and wrecked at Manhaven, County Durham.
Susan	United Kingdom	The sloop was driven ashore at Bacton, Norfolk. Her crew were rescued by the Coastguard using rocket apparatus.
Swantje Elizabeth	Bremen	The ship foundered in the North Sea with the loss of two lives. She was on a voyage from Trondheim, Norway to Newcastle upon Tyne, Northumberland, United Kingdom.
Tyne	United Kingdom	The ship was lost near "Scregrund". Her crew were rescued. She was on a voyage from Gävle, Sweden to London.
Yarmouth	United Kingdom	The barque departed from Cádiz, Spain for Thessaloniki, Greece. No further trace, presumed foundered with the loss of all hands.

== 17 November ==
List of shipwrecks: 17 November 1866
Ship	State	Description
Anna Maria	United Kingdom	The ship was driven ashore near Hooksiel, Prussia. She was on a voyage from Newcastle upon Tyne, Northumberland to Papenburg, Prussia.
Diana	United Kingdom	The ship was driven ashore and wrecked at Burghead, Moray with the loss of a crew member.
Jonan	Prussia	The schooner was abandoned in the North Sea. Her crew were rescued by the fishing smack Lucy (United Kingdom). Jonan was on a voyage from South Shields, County Durham, United Kingdom to "Lea".
Lincolnshire	United Kingdom	The steamship was sighted off Kalana, Russia whilst on a voyage from Saint Petersburg, Russia to Hull, Yorkshire No further trace, presumed foundered with the loss of all twenty crew.
Olga	Netherlands	The steamship ran aground in the Oude Vlie. She was on a voyage from Harlingen, Friesland to London, United Kingdom. She was refloated on 19 November.
Swann	United Kingdom	The schooner was driven ashore at Ostend, Norfolk. Her four crew were rescued by the Bacton Lifeboat.
Three Daughters	United Kingdom	The barque sank off Swalecliffe, Kent. She was on a voyage from Rochester, Kent to London. She was refloated on 6 December and towed back to Rochester.
Vintage	United Kingdom	The schooner went ashore and wrecked on Flotta, Orkney Islands, after splitting her sails (on voyage from Wick to Thurso); the crew were saved.
Unnamed	France	A brig was driven ashore at Happisburgh, Norfolk, United Kingdom. Her crew were rescued.

== 18 November ==
List of shipwrecks: 18 November 1866
Ship	State	Description
Alexandriene	Prussia	The schooner foundered 3 nautical miles (5.6 km) south east of Cellardyke, Fife, United Kingdom. Her six crew survived. She was on a voyage from Tayport, Fife to Stettin. Alexandrine came ashore at Eyebroughy, Lothian, United Kingdom the next day. She was refloated on 23 November and take in to Leith, Lothian.
Bannockburn	United Kingdom	The schooner was driven ashore at Thisted, Denmarkl. Her crew were rescued. She was on a voyage from South Shields, County Durham to Colberg.
Boxer	United States	The schooner sprung a leak and sank off Eastern Point. Crew saved.
Helen	United Kingdom	The schooner was driven ashore at Bo'ness, Lothian. She was on a voyage from Middlesbrough, Yorkshire to Bo'ness. She was refloated and taken in to Bo'ness in a severely leaky condition.
Jacques	France	The ship was abandoned in the Atlantic Ocean and was set afire. All on board were rescued by Tonawanda (United States). Jacques was on a voyage from Saint-Pierre to Granville, Manche.
Johanna Emilie	Netherlands	The ship departed from Batavia, Netherlands East Indies for a British port. No further trace, presumed foundered with the loss of all hands.
Joseph and Elizabeth	United Kingdom	The brig was wrecked on the Goodwin Sands, Kent. Her crew were rescued by a lifeboat. She was on a voyage from Whitby, Yorkshire to Dunkirk, Nord, France.
Lamburn	United Kingdom	The brig was wrecked at Hastings, Sussex.
Le Esperan Maria	France	The fishing boat collided with the barque Neptune (United Kingdom) and sank off the coast of Kent. Her crew were rescued.
Makama	United Kingdom	The ship ran aground at Liverpool, Lancashire. She was on a voyage from Saint John, New Brunswick, British North America to Liverpool. She was refloated.
Martha Clay	United Kingdom	The ship foundered off Cape Bon, Algeria. Her crew were rescued. She was on a voyage from Odesa, Russia to Sunderland, County Durham.
Scandinavian	Norway	The ship was wrecked on the Couch Reef. She was on a voyage from Pensacola, Florida, United States to Queenstown, County Cork, United Kingdom.

== 19 November ==
List of shipwrecks: 19 November 1866
Ship	State	Description
Crimea	United Kingdom	The brig was wrecked on the Hinder Bank, in the North Sea off the Dutch coast. Her crew were rescued.
Harmonie	United Kingdom	The schooner was driven ashore at Thisted, Denmark. Her crew were rescued. She was on a voyage from Newcastle upon Tyne, Northumberland to Ystad, Sweden.
Palmyra	United Kingdom	The collier, a brig, was run into by the steamship Earl of Durham (United Kingdom) and sank in the River Thames at Millwall, Middlesex.
Thomas Rowell	United Kingdom	The ship ran aground off the mouth of the Eider. Her crew were rescued.
Uruguay	United Kingdom	The ship collided with another vessel and sank in the Pacific Ocean south of Valparaíso, Chile. She was on a voyage from Valparaíso to Liverpool.
Vivid	United Kingdom	The ship was driven ashore at Ostend, West Flanders, Belgium. Her crew were rescued by the Ostend Lifeboat. She was on a voyage from King's Lynn, Norfolk to Dunkirk.

== 20 November ==
List of shipwrecks: 20 November 1866
Ship	State	Description
Endeavour	United Kingdom	The ship was wrecked at Rønne, Denmark.
Odessa	United Kingdom	The ship was wrecked at Rønne.
Richard and Sarah	United Kingdom	The ship was wrecked at Middleton, County Durham. She was on a voyage from Sunderland, County Durham to London.
Tynside	United Kingdom	The ship sank off Ostend, West Flanders, Belgium. Her crew were rescued. She was on a voyage from South Shields, County Durham to Rochester, Kent.

== 21 November ==
List of shipwrecks: 21 November 1866
Ship	State	Description
Dawn	United Kingdom	The brig, master Tinn, was wrecked near Fredrikshamn, Grand Duchy of Finland. Her crew were rescued. She was on a voyage from Kronstadt, Russia to London with cargo of timber.
Lady Jocelyn	United Kingdom	The ship ran aground and sank at Dunkirk, Nord, France. She was on a voyage from Sunderland, County Durham to Dunkirk. She was later refloated, arriving at Whitby, Yorkshire on 24 December for repairs.
Lancet	United Kingdom	The brig was driven ashore at Great Yarmouth, Norfolk. She was on a voyage from Riga, Russia to Belfast, County Antrim. She was refloated with the assistance of a tug.
Mangosteen	United Kingdom	The ship was abandoned in the Atlantic Ocean. Her crew were rescued. She was on a voyage from Lata, India to Swansea, Glamorgan.
Millbank	United Kingdom	The steamship was abandoned in the North Sea. Her crew were rescued by George (Prussia). Millbank was on a voyage from Kronstadt, Russia to London. She was driven ashore and wrecked on Vlieland, Friesland, Netherlands on 24 November.
Porcia	United Kingdom	The brig ran aground at Dunkirk and was severely damaged. She was on a voyage from Sunderland to Dunkirk.
Rollason	United Kingdom	The brig sank near Ostend, West Flanders, Belgium. Her crew were rescued. She was on a voyage from South Shields, County Durham to Rochester, Kent.
Zwantina	Netherlands	The galiot was driven ashore crewless at Blyth, Northumberland, United Kingdom and was wrecked.

== 22 November ==
List of shipwrecks: 22 November 1866
Ship	State	Description
Annie Size	United States	The ship was driven ashore at Kattendijke, Zeeland, Netherlands. She was refloated the next day and taken in to Antwerp, Belgium.
Catherine and Ann	United Kingdom	The brig foundered off Motu di Bali, Italy. She was on a voyage from South Shields, County Durham to Venice, Italy.
Volga	United Kingdom	The hulk capsized at Dartmouth, Devon and was severely damaged.

== 23 November ==
List of shipwrecks: 23 November 1866
Ship	State	Description
Chowdean	United Kingdom	The barque ran aground at North Shields, Northumberland. She was on a voyage from Pomaron, Portugal to North Shields. She was refloated.
Cyrus Russell	United Kingdom	The ship was driven ashore near Arichat, Nova Scotia, British North America. She was on a voyage from Prince Edward Island, British North America to a British port.
Hannah	United Kingdom	The schooner was run into by Mary (United Kingdom) and sank off Lindisfarne, Northumberland. Her crew were rescued. Hannah was on a voyage from South Shields, County Durham to Dundee, Forfarshire.
Henry	United Kingdom	The schooner ran aground on the Burbo Bank, in Liverpool Bay. She was on a voyage from Teignmouth, Devon to Liverpool, Lancashire. She floated off and sank near the Crosby Lightship ( Trinity House). Her six crew were rescued by a gig.
Lady of the Lake	United Kingdom	The schooner was wrecked on the Plough Rock, off the coast of Northumberland with the loss of all hands.
Merrimac	United States	The ship was driven ashore and wrecked in Townsends Inlet. She was on a voyage from Liverpool to Philadelphia, Pennsylvania.
Messina	Trieste	The barque ran aground on the Cockle Sand, in the North Sea off the coast of Norfolk, United Kingdom. She was on a voyage from Trieste to Hull, Yorkshire. She was refloated and taken in to Great Yarmouth, Norfolk in a wasterlogged condition.
Mette Margrethe	Norway	The barque ran aground on the Øregrund. She was on a voyage from Gävle, Sweden to London, United Kingdom. She was refloated and put in to Copenhagen, Denmark in a leaky condition.
Moira	United Kingdom	The ship was wrecked at Burray, Shetland Islands. Her crew were rescued.
Torfrida	United Kingdom	The barque foundered 43 nautical miles (80 km) west of Skellig Michael, County Kerry. Her fourteen crew survived. She was on a voyage from the Clyde to New York, United States.
Wellington	United Kingdom	The ship struck a submerged object at Dublin and sank.
Zwantje Elizabeth	Netherlands	The galiot sank in the Dogger Bank. Her crew were rescued. She was on a voyage from Groningen to Newcastle upon Tyne, Northumberland.

== 24 November ==
List of shipwrecks: 24 November 1866
Ship	State	Description
Albion	United Kingdom	The ship ran aground and was severely damaged at Tralee, County Kerry. She was refloated the next day.
Coya	United Kingdom	The barque was wrecked near Pescadero, California, United States with the loss of about twenty lives. Three survivors were rescued. She was on a voyage from Sydney, New South Wales to San Francisco, California.
Dunsandie	United Kingdom	The barque ran aground at Kastrup, Denmark. She was on a voyage from Riga, Russia to South Shields, County Durham. She was refloated and resumed her voyage.
Hebe	United Kingdom	The schooner ran aground off Blakeney, Norfolk. She was refloated and assisted in to Great Yarmouth, Norfolk.
Helen McDonald	United Kingdom	The ship was lost off Sagua La Grande, Cuba. She was on a voyage from the Clyde to Cárdenas, Cuba.
Lancashire Witch	United Kingdom	The barque ran aground at Kastrup. She was on a voyage from Kronstadt, Russia to an English port. She was refloated and resumed her voyage.
Monarch	United Kingdom	The barque was driven ashore and wrecked at Winterton-on-Sea, Norfolk. Her crew survived.

== 25 November ==
List of shipwrecks: 25 November 1866
Ship	State	Description
Aleida	Prussia	The galiot foundered in Robin Hoods Bay with the loss of a crew member.
Hunter	United Kingdom	The schooner was wrecked at Brancaster, Norfolk. Her crew were rescued. She was on a voyage from Charlestown, Cornwall to Bruges, East Flanders, Belgium.

== 26 November ==
List of shipwrecks: 26 November 1866
Ship	State	Description
Elizabeth	United Kingdom	The brig was wrecked on the Burbo Bank, in Liverpool Bay. with the loss of all on board. She was on a voyage from Demerara, British Guiana to Liverpool, Lancashire.
Eva	United Kingdom	The ship was driven ashore at Crosby, Lancashire. She was on a voyage from Bristol, Gloucestershire to Liverpool. She was refloated and taken in to Liverpool.
Hannah	United Kingdom	The ship collided with Mary (United Kingdom) and sank at Lindisfarne, Northumberland.
Merthyr Packet	United Kingdom	The ship sank in the Bristol Channel off the coast of Somerset. She was on a voyage from Cardiff, Glamorgan to Highbridge, Somerset.
Richard and William	United Kingdom	The ship ran aground on the Blacktail Sand, in the Thames Estuary. She was on a voyage from Africa to London. She was refloated.

== 27 November ==
List of shipwrecks: 27 November 1866
Ship	State	Description
John Usher	United Kingdom	The paddle tug caught fire at South Shields, County Durham and was scuttled.
Lizzie Southard	United Kingdom	The ship was driven ashore in the Bay of all Saints and was wrecked. She was on a voyage from Cardiff, Glamorgan to Aden.
Prince	United Kingdom	The ship sank at Galveston, Texas, United States. She was refloated on 2 December and towed to New Orleans, Louisiana, United States for repairs.
Von Schach Rey	Rostock	The ship was wrecked off Skagen, Denmark. She was on a voyage from Rostock to an English port.

== 28 November ==
List of shipwrecks: 28 November 1866
Ship	State	Description
Æquator	Netherlands	The ship was wrecked at Brouwershaven, Zeeland with the loss of all but one of her crew. She was on a voyage from Callao, Peru to Rotterdam, South Holland.
Colorado	United Kingdom	The barque was destroyed by fire in the Le Maire Strait. Her crew survived. She was on a voyage from Swansea, Glamorgan to Valparaíso, Chile.
HMS Speedy	Royal Navy	The Britomart-class gunboat ran aground in Sandown Bay. She was refloated and returned to service.

== 29 November ==
List of shipwrecks: 29 November 1866
Ship	State	Description
Adolphus	(United Kingdom of Great Britain and Ireland) New South Wales	The brigantine was wrecked without loss of life on rocks west of Pier Head at the harbour at Wollongong, New South Wales, Australia.
Garnett	United Kingdom	The ship was driven ashore and wrecked on Holy Isle, in the Firth of Clyde. She was on a voyage from Glasgow, Renfrewshire to Belfast, County Antrim. The wreck floated off on 30 November and sank.
Helene	Prussia	The barque ran aground on the Lillegrunden, in the Baltic Sea. She was on a voyage from Memel to Liverpool. She was refloated on 1 December and taken in to Copenhagen, Denmark.
Lord Berehaven	United Kingdom	The smack foundered in Dingle Bay. Her crew were rescued.
Sea Queen	United Kingdom	The steamship ran aground on the Stubbenground, off Copenhagen, Denmark. She was on a voyage from Kronstadt, Russia to London. Sea Queen was refloated on 3 December and resumed her voyage.
Undine	Norway	The ship ran aground at Stavanger. She was on a voyage from Newcastle upon Tyne, Northumberland, United Kingdom to Alexandria, Egypt. She was refloated and taken in to Stavanger.
Wilhelm Bechtel	Prussia	The ship was driven ashore and wrecked on "Doy Romer". She was on a voyage from Bordeaux, Gironde, France to New York, United States.
Woodhouse	United Kingdom	The barque was wrecked on Formentera, Spain. Her crew were rescued. She was on a voyage from Cardiff, Glamorgan to Cartagena, Spain.

== 30 November ==
List of shipwrecks: 30 November 1866
Ship	State	Description
Baltimore	United States	The steamship sprang a leak and was beached on Cape Sable Island, Nova Scotia, British North America, where she was wrecked. She was on a voyage from Portland, Maine to Halifax, Nova Scotia.
Coronation	United Kingdom	The schooner ran aground on the Inner Barber Sand, in the North Sea off the coast of Suffolk and sank. Her eight crew were rescued by the Caister Lifeboat Birmingham ( Royal National Lifeboat Institution).
Emerald	United Kingdom	The fishing smack collided with the smack Welfare (United Kingdom) and sank off Flamborough Head, Yorkshire. Her crew were rescued by Welfare.
Erin	United Kingdom	The schooner collided with the tug Jasper (United Kingdom) and sank off Great Cumbrae. Her five crew were rescued by Jasper. Erin was on a voyage from Limerick to Glasgow, Renfrewshire.
Friends	United Kingdom	The smack was driven ashore at Great Yarmouth, Norfolk. Her eight crew were rescued by the Coastguard.
Osprey	United Kingdom	The schooner was sighted off Helsingør, Denmark whilst on a voyage from Stettin to London. No further trace, presumed foundered with the loss of all five crew.
Stour	United Kingdom	The schooner was driven ashore at Lowestoft, Suffolk. She was on a voyage from London to South Shields, County Durham. She was refloated on 3 December and taken in to Lowestoft.
Tay	United Kingdom	The schooner was wrecked on the Gaa Sands, off the mouth of the River Tay. Her five crew were rescued by the Broughty Ferry Lifeboat.
Unnamed	Flag unknown	A brig was wrecked on the Winterton Ridge, in the North Sea off the coast of Norfolk, United Kingdom with either the loss of a crew member, or the loss of all but one of her crew.

== Unknown date ==
List of shipwrecks: Unknown date in November 1866
Ship	State	Description
A 1	United States	The ship foundered off Batavia, Netherlands East Indies with the loss of all but three of her crew. Survivors were rescued by Silvercraig (United Kingdom).
Ableme	United Kingdom	The brig was driven ashore near Cape Lookout, North Carolina United States before 3 November. She was on a voyage from Wilmington, North Carolina to Liverpool, Lancashire.
Agamemnon	United Kingdom	The ship ran aground in the Caramata Passage. She was on a voyage from Shanghai, China to London. She was refloated and taken in to Singapore, Straits Settlements, where she arrived on 30 November.
Althea	United States	The ship was lost near Falmouth, Jamaica.
Azeline	France	The ship was driven ashore and wrecked at Dunkirk, Nord.
Belgravia	United Kingdom	The ship was wrecked at Cocanada, India before 13 November.
Circassian	United Kingdom	The ship was beached at Newhaven, Sussex. She was refloated on 19 November and towed in to Newhaven.
Angelita	Spain	The ship sank off Port-Vendres, Basses-Pyrénées, France. She was on a voyage from Port-Vendres to Barcelona.
E. M. Dyer	United States	The schooner was abandoned in the Atlantic Ocean. Five crew were rescued by May (United Kingdom), but two of them died shortly afterwards.
Fleetwing	United Kingdom	The ship was lost at "Sergonest" before 3 November. She was on a voyage from Saint John's, Newfoundland to Prince Edward Island, British North America.
Fortuna	United Kingdom	The ship was driven ashore on the Belgian coast before 20 November. She was on a voyage from South Shields, County Durham to Singapore.
Gem of Bombay	India	The ship was wrecked off Chittagong with the loss of sixteen lives.
Golgotha	United Kingdom	The barque was driven ashore near Carrickfergus, County Antrim. She was refloated with the assistance of a tug.
Haldee	United Kingdom	The ship was driven ashore on "Digskar" before 21 November.
Herman Bakker	Flag unknown	The ship collided with Maren Dorother (Norway) and was abandoned. She was on a voyage from Saint Petersburg, Russia to London.
Ida	United States	The brig was driven ashore at Newport, Rhode Island. She was on a voyage from Philadelphia, Pennsylvania to Rotterdam, South Holland, Netherlands.
Ingorina	United Kingdom	The ship foundered off Timor, Spanish East Indies. She was on a voyage from Sydney, New South Wales to Mauritius.
Legatus	United Kingdom	The barque, master Read, was wrecked before 16 November on the Kalkgrund, Estonia, in the Baltic Sea. Her crew and part of rye cargo were rescued. She was on a voyage from Kronstadt, Russia to Helsingør, Denmark.
Liseuka	Flag unknown	The ship was wrecked at Lisbon, Portugal.
Marie	Grand Duchy of Mecklenburg-Schwerin	The ship departed from Stralsund for Hartlepool, County Durham in early November. No further trace, presumed foundered with the loss of all hands.
Mary Anne	United Kingdom	The brig was wrecked at Scheveningen, South Holland, Netherlands with the loss of all but one of her ten crew.
Nellie	United Kingdom	The brig was wrecked at Port Williams, Nova Scotia, British North America before 3 November. She was on a voyage from Saint John, New Brunswick, British North America to New York, United States.
Premium	United Kingdom	The ship was driven ashore and wrecked at Callantsoog, North Holland, Netherlands. Her crew were rescued. She was on a voyage from Seaham, County Durham to the Nieuw Diep.
Result	United Kingdom	The ship was destroyed by fire in Hobson's Bay.
Rose	United Kingdom	The ship was wrecked near Wigtown with the loss of her captain. She was on a voyage from Barrow in Furness, Lancashire to Wigtown.
Simon Habley	United Kingdom	The barque collided with the extreme clipper Star of the Union (United States) and sank off Cape Horn, Chile.
Swiftsure	(United Kingdom of Great Britain and Ireland) Straits Settlements	The ship was wrecked at Newchang, China. She was on a voyage from Singapore to Hong Kong.
Tieng Chang	China	The steamship was wrecked at Copchi Point, India.
Trinidad	United Kingdom	The ship was abandoned in the Atlantic Ocean before 7 November. She was on a voyage from Havana, Cuba to the Clyde.
Tritonia	United Kingdom	The ship was driven ashore. She was on a voyage from Kronstadt to the Weser. She was refloated and taken in to Helsingør, where she arrived on 30 November in a leaky condition.
Turchang	United Kingdom	The ship was wrecked on "Couphi Point".
Vittorio	Flag unknown.	The ship was driven ashore. She was on a voyage from Newcastle upon Tyne, Northumberland, United Kingdom to Alexandria, Egypt. She was refloated and taken in to Alexandria, where she arrived on 9 November.
Willamo	United Kingdom	The ship was driven ashore at "Torpe".
