= SS Formosa =

British mail steamer

History

United Kingdom
- Name: Formosa
- Owner: Peninsular and Oriental Steam Navigation Company
- Operator: 1851-1870, P&O Line. 1870-1876, China Navigation Co
- Port of registry: London, UK
- Route: Southampton-Teneriffe-St Helena-Cape Town-Melbourne-Sydney; Sydney-Melbourne-Adelaide-King George's Sound-Galle-Singapore; Mumbai-Galle-Penang-Singapore-Hong Kong-Shanghai
- Builder: Smith & Rodger, Glasgow
- Launched: 17 April 1852
- Completed: 1852
- Maiden voyage: 1852
- Out of service: 1876
- Fate: Disappeared from record after 1929

General characteristics
- Type: Passenger/cargo ocean liner
- Tonnage: 676 GRT
- Length: 211 ft (64 m)
- Beam: 26 ft (7.9 m)
- Draught: 29 ft (8.8 m)
- Decks: (passenger accessible)
- Installed power: 180–200 hp (130–150 kW)
- Propulsion: Direct-acting steam steeple engines, single screw
- Speed: 13 knots (24 km/h; 15 mph)
- Capacity: 88 passengers (48 first class, 40 second class)

SS Formosa was a British mail steamer belonging to the Peninsular and Oriental Steam Navigation Company (P & O). Originally ordered by another line as the Caledonia, P & O bought it before completion in 1852, as its third screw steamer (the others being Chusan and Shanghai), renaming it after the Chinese island of Formosa.

The ship employed cutting-edge technology for its time, featuring a steeple-type steam engine with high-pressure boilers and a screw propeller.

Setting out from Southampton on 7 August 1852, Formosa made Sydney on 22 October, in 75 days and 6 hours (including 12 days' stoppage), the fastest on record, despite a strike on board. This record stood until the next August, when the General Screw Steam Shipping Company’s Argo made a time of 66 days.

Necessary repairs to Formosa's drive assembly, accomplished (in the absence of dry dock facilities) by flooding the forward compartments and raising the stern out of the water, delaying the ship's departure for Singapore until 10 November. Any further delay might have caused the ship to miss the departure from Singapore of the China mail for London. Held up by storms, Captain William Parfitt headed from King George's Sound direct to Galle, just in time to intercept the paddle steamer Precursor on its way to Suez from Calcutta. On the last leg of its voyage to Singapore, the cross head of its engine broke. The Formosa finally made it to Singapore on 12 February.

Thereafter, P & O used Formosa on the Mumbai-China run. In 1870, the ship was sold to the China Navigation Company, but did not sail for more than six years. The ship disappeared from the records after 1929.

== Timeline ==
Major events in the history of the Formosa.

- 1851: Purchased while under construction by P&O Lines.
- 1852: Delivered to P&O Lines.
- 1852: Maiden voyage from Glasgow to Southampton.
- 7 August 1852: Maiden sailing from Southampton to Sydney.
- 22 October 1852: Arrival in Sydney.
- 10 November 1852: Departure for Singapore.
- 14 December 1852: Arrival in Galle.
- 12 February 1853: Arrival in Galle; transferred to Mumbai-China run.
- 1870: Sold to China Navigation Company.
