= Torrent (ship) =

American sailing ship wrecked in 1868

Coordinates: 58.9138°N 153.2812°W

- Torrent

History
- Launched: 1852
- Fate: Wrecked 15 July 1868

General characteristics
- Tonnage: 576 tons
- Length: 50 m (160 ft) (approximate)

Torrent was an American three-mast wooden barque that shipwrecked off the coast of Alaska on 15 July 1868 while transporting a company of United States Army artillerymen to Cook Inlet. Torrent was built in Bath, Maine in 1852. The ship consisted of two decks, was 576 tons, and likely measured 50 meters in length.

== Final voyage and wreck ==
The crew of Torrent in 1868.

In October 1867, the United States and the Russian Empire signed the Alaska Treaty, through with the United States acquired new territories now belonging to the present state of Alaska. To protect the American interests, the United States Army sent an artillery company to construct a new fort near the mouth of the Kenai River on Cook Inlet. The fort would complement the existing forts being constructed at Sitka and Kodiak.

Battery F of the Second Regiment of United States Artillery was chosen to construct the fort, departing Fort Vancouver in Washington Territory under the command of Brevet Captain/First Lieutenant John McGilvray in June 1868 aboard the vessel Torrent, which was one of two sailing ships chartered to carry the men, ammunition, supplies and building materials to the new fort at Cook Inlet. (Lieutenant McGilvray was commanding the company during the long-term absence of his battery commander, Captain Samuel Nicoll Benjamin, then detailed as an instructor at West Point.) The transported provisions were intended to last six months, and a second vessel, Milan, commanded by Captain Joseph Snow, followed carrying 267,000 board feet (630 m^{3}) of lumber and 300 tons of coal.

Torrent was commanded by Captain Richard Carlton and carried a crew of 15 men, in addition to its passengers consisting of five United States Army officers, 125 enlisted men, four laundresses, two servants, and 11 children. It set sail for Alaska on 11 June 1868.

Torrent sailed north for almost a month, reaching Kodiak Island on 7 July. The following day she headed to Cook Inlet through the Chugachnik Gulf (now known as Kachemak Bay). It is unclear why she followed this route since the orders were to proceed to the Russian settlement of St. Nicholas near the mouth of the Kenai River.

Torrent preparing to set sail in 1868.

As the ship approached, lookouts were able to see Kenai and what is now called as Homer Spit. The next morning, First Lieutenant McGilvray dispatched a small reconnaissance party in one of the ship's boats. Upon inspecting the terrain, McGilvray was convinced that it would be impossible to establish even a temporary post at that place.

After conferring with the captain and others knowledgeable about the area, McGilvray decided to establish a temporary fort at Port Graham, about 20 miles (32 km) south. Torrent set sail on the morning of 12 July, encountering a storm in the area. The storm was so strong that she returned to Kenai Harbor to wait until the next day. On 13 July, she set sail again, entering Cook Inlet. However, the storm covered them again as she made her way along the coastline. On 14 July, the men were able to see Port Graham at the distance and decided to wait until the next day to land.

On the morning of 15 July, the mate sailed Torrent to the harbor but couldn't avoid a long, rocky reef that extends from the shore about a 1.5 miles (2.4 km). With a strong current estimated at 7 knots (13 km/h; 8.1 mph), Torrent struck the reef hard. The strong current spun her 180 degrees, carrying her onto the rocks. The hull timbers broke and she began taking-on water.

Quickly, the passengers and crew boarded the ship's six lifeboats and abandoned the ship, without having time to salvage battery equipment, provisions, or personal belongings. Shortly after, the ship sank. All of the passengers reached shore safely. An Army officer and some of the sailors attempted to reach Fort Kodiak in one of the lifeboats, but were forced to return.

The castaways were rescued two weeks later by Captain Snow, of Milan, and by Captain Erskine, of the steamer Fidelater, who spotted the Torrent's wreckage floating in the sea.

== Aftermath ==
The men and families of Battery F, 2nd U.S. Artillery spent the winter of 1868/1869 at Fort Kodiak; Lieutenant McGilvray returned south to report the loss of the vessel and his battery equipment in August and returned to his command in September 1868. The company departed in April 1869 aboard the steamer Constantine, arriving at the Russian settlement of St. Nicholas on 17 April 1869 and establishing what would become Fort Kenai. The garrison would remain active for less than two years, when the Army headquarters ordered its abandonment in August 1870.

== Discovery of the wreck ==
On 9 October 2007, it was announced that the remains of the ship had been found by a team led by Steve Lloyd. Divers found the wreckage off the south-central Alaska coast. It is believed to be the oldest American shipwreck ever found in Alaskan waters.

Discovered on the wreck were guns, cannons, shoes and plates, as well as brass, copper and bronze objects. Divers also located a toilet, two anchors, sections of hull and heavy bronze rudder hinges weighing at least 100 pounds (45 kg). One anchor measured 10 feet (3.0 m) tall with a stem 2.5 feet (0.76 m) in circumference.
