= Israel Whitney House =

Historic house in Massachusetts, United States

- U.S. National Register of Historic Places
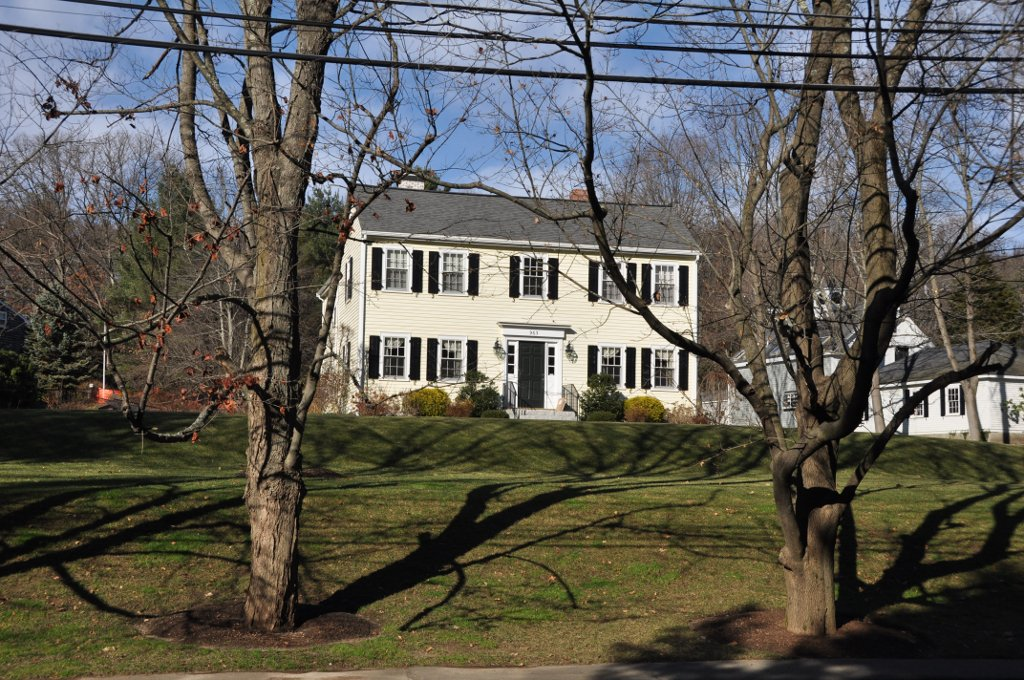

- Location within Massachusetts Location within the United States
- Location: 963 Central Avenue, Needham, Massachusetts
- Coordinates: 42°17′16″N 71°15′8″W
- Built: 1830
- Architectural style: Greek Revival, Federal
- NRHP reference No.: 88000160
- Added to NRHP: February 25, 1988

The Israel Whitney House is a historic house in Needham, Massachusetts. It is a 2 1/2-story wood-frame house, five bays wide, with a side gable roof and clapboard siding. Its front facade is symmetrical, with a center entrance flanked by sidelight windows and pilasters, and a corniced entablature on top. The house was built in 1830 by Israel Whitney, who had married Mary Fuller, a descendant of one of Needham's early settlers. Whitney had purchased the land on which the house was built in 1829. Whitney was a shoemaker and active in local politics, holding a variety of offices.

In the 1940s, the house was sold to Elizabeth D. Revere, the wife of a distant relative of Paul Revere.

The house was listed on the National Register of Historic Places in 1988.

== See also ==
- National Register of Historic Places listings in Norfolk County, Massachusetts
