= North Hylton =

Suburb of Sunderland, England

Coordinates: 54.915203°N 1.446451°W

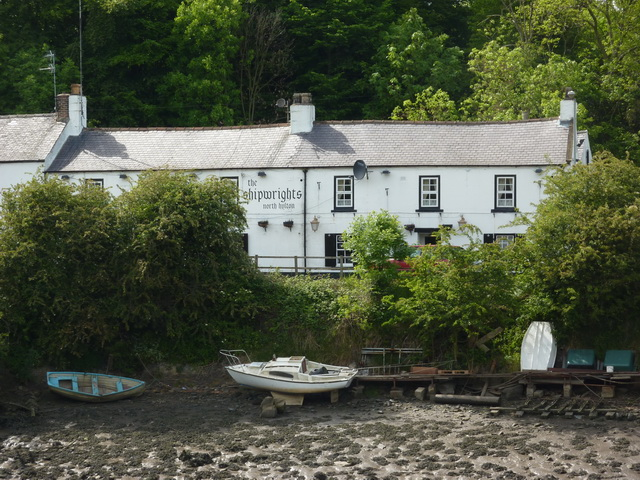
- The Shipwrights, North Hylton

- Location within Tyne and Wear
- Metropolitan borough: City of Sunderland
- Metropolitan county: Tyne and Wear
- Region: North East
- Country: England
- Sovereign state: United Kingdom
- Post town: Sunderland
- Postcode district: SR5
- Dialling code: 0191
- Police: Northumbria
- Fire: Tyne and Wear
- Ambulance: North East
- UK Parliament: Houghton and Washington East

North Hylton is a suburb of Sunderland, Tyne and Wear, in northeast England. It is on the north bank of River Wear opposite South Hylton.

Hylton Castle is in North Hylton. The settlement developed in the 14th century around the river crossing which was operated by the Lords of Hilton. By the 18th century industries such as shipbuilding contributed to population growth resulting in an 1871 Census return of almost 500.

The area is the subject of the painting A Breezy Day, North Hylton by Richard A Ray.
