= Westward Ho! (clipper) =

1852 California clipper

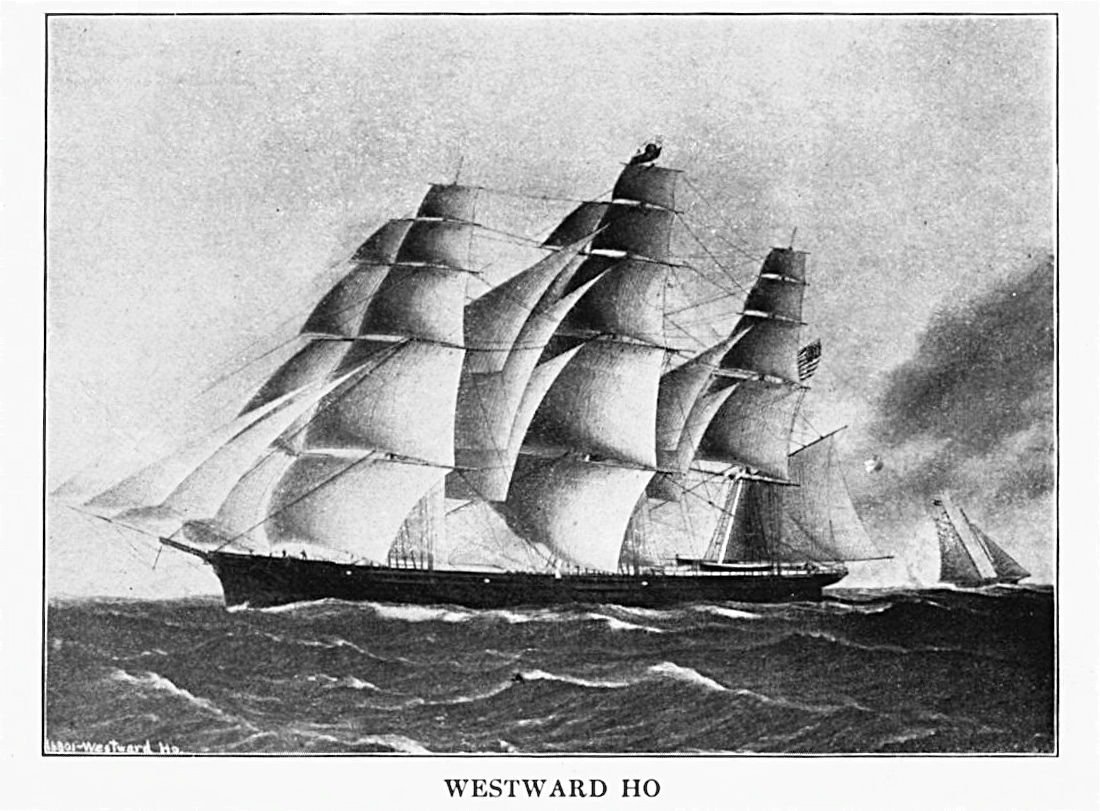

History

United States
- Name: Westward Ho!
- Owner: Sampson & Tappan
- Builder: Donald McKay, East Boston
- Launched: September 24, 1852

History

Peru
- Owner: Don Juan de Ugarte
- Acquired: 1857
- Fate: Caught fire and sank, February 24, 1864

General characteristics
- Class & type: Clipper
- Tons burthen: 1600 tons
- Length: 220 ft (67 m)
- Beam: 40 ft 6 in (12.34 m)
- Draft: 23 ft 6 in (7.16 m)
- Notes: 2 decks

Westward Ho! was an 1852 clipper that made two very fast passages to San Francisco; 100 days from Boston and New York City. She had a very close race with Neptune's Car, and ended her days in the coolie trade.

== Construction ==
Westward Ho! had long, very sharp ends, with concave lines. Her frame was of white oak, and planking of hard pine. She was copper fastened, with yellow metal sheathing. The hull was painted black, the inside buff relieved with white, the waterways blue.

The finish work below decks was quite fancy, with rosewood, mahogany, carvings, gold ornamentation, and paneled mirrors. Some of the cabins had stained glass windows with Venetian blinds. The figurehead was a Native American warrior giving chase.

== Voyages ==
Westward Ho! made a very fast passage to San Francisco between January 12 and April 22, 1855, under Capt. Johnson. She arrived in San Francisco just 100 days and 18 hours from Boston Light. One day later, the clipper Neptune’s Car left Sandy Hook, New York. She arrived in San Francisco one day after Westward Ho!, after a passage of 100 days, 23½ hours.

In 1856, Westward Ho! brought 800 coolies from Swatow to Callao, for work in the guano deposits. Westward Ho! caught fire on February 27, 1864, at anchor in Callao.
