= List of shipwrecks in 1877 =

The list of shipwrecks in 1877 includes ships sunk, foundered, grounded, or otherwise lost during 1877.

table of contents
1877
Jan	Feb	Mar	Apr
May	Jun	Jul	Aug
Sep	Oct	Nov	Dec
Unknown date

== Unknown date ==
List of shipwrecks: Unknown date 1877
Ship	State	Description
Aleuta	Imperial Russian Navy	The schooner was wrecked on "Matsma Island" in late 1877.
Alpha	United Kingdom	The barque was destroyed by fire at sea between 13 September and 30 November. Her cfrew were rescued by the barque Kohinoor (United Kingdom). Alpha was on a voyage from Liverpool, Lancashire to Valparaíso, Chile.
Camelia	United Kingdom	The barque struck a sunken rock and foundered off the Isla de Flores, Uruguay. Her crew were rescued.
Ceres	Norway	The brig was abandoned in the North Sea after 20 April. She was on a voyage from South Shields, County Durham, United Kingdom to Christiania. She was towed in to Grimsby, Lincolnshire, United Kingdom on 4 May.
Charles	United Kingdom	The fishing lugger was driven ashore and wrecked at Holywell, Sussex in the autumn of 1877. Both crew were rescued by the Eastbourne Lifeboat.
Charmer	United Kingdom	The ship was wrecked on "Dyer's Island", Cape Colony.
Chundrabhan	India	The ship was wrecked on the Malabar Coast.
Circassian	United Kingdom	The ship departed from Liverpool for Rio de Janeiro, Brazil. No further trace, presumed foundered with the loss of all 28 crew.
Clara Bell	United States	The barque was abandoned in the Beaufort Sea a few miles south of Cape Smith, Department of Alaska (70°40′N 151°30′W). She was found at anchor and clear of ice in 1877, partially stripped by Alaska Natives. Passing ships further stripped her. Around 20 September 1877 she broke loose and drifted off to the northeast. She was last seen off Harrison Bay before she disappeared in the Beaufort Sea.
Concordia	United Kingdom	The barque was abandoned at sea. She was on a voyage from San Francisco, California, United States to Cape Town, Cape Colony.
D. S. Soule	United Kingdom	The ship was abandoned in the Atlantic Ocean between 19 October and 14 November. Her crew were rescued. She was on a voyage from New York, United States to Queenstown, County Cork.
Evadne	Flag unknown	The ship, a brig or brigantine capsized in the Atlantic Ocean between 14 August and 25 September.
Ganja Nerisal Navi Bhabi	India	The ship was lost in the Gulf of Cambay with the loss of 63 of the 111 people on board.
Glendale	United Kingdom	The ship was abandoned at sea between 3 August and 25 September. She was on a voyage from Charleston, South Carolina, United States to a British port.
Hampshire	United Kingdom	The barque was destroyed by fire at sea in late November or early December. Her crew were rescued. She was on a voyage from Swansea, Glamorgan to Valparaíso.
Hampton	United Kingdom	The full-rigged ship was destroyed by fire in the Indian Ocean. Her 28 crew took to four boats; fifteen of them in two boats reached the Seychelles. It was thought that those in the other two boats had been rescued. Hampton was on a voyage from Leith, Lothian to Bombay, India.
Hannah Law	United Kingdom	The ship was abandoned at sea. Her crew were rescued by Minniehaha (United Kingdom). Hannah Law was on a voyage from Hong Kong to New York.
Jadaree	India	The ship was run down and sunk at Bombay by Pekin (United Kingdom).
Jacques Cartier	France	The ship was wrecked on the coast of New Caledonia. She was on a voyage from Melbourne, Victoria to Mauritius.
Margaret	United Kingdom	The ship foundered in the Atlantic Ocean between 27 November and 2 December with the loss of all but one of her crew. The survivor was rescued by the steamship Rivera (Spain). Margaret was on a voyage from Cardiff, Glamorgan to Malta.
Margaretha	Germany	The brig was wrecked at "Petit Iron".
Montezuma	United Kingdom	The steamship was captured by pirates off the Spanish Main. She was plundered and set afire. Some of her crew were murdered. There were twenty survivors.
Mya	United Kingdom	The ship departed from New York for London. No further trace, presumed foundered with the loss of all seventeen crew.
Orakau	New Zealand	The 44-ton barge went ashore and was wrecked at the mouth of the Waikato River.
Paramount	United States	The barque was wrecked in the Atlantic Ocean with the loss of all fifteen crew. She was on a voyage from the West Indies to Baltimore, Maryland.
Royal Dane	United Kingdom	The clipper was wrecked on the coast of Chile. She was on a voyage from Callao, Peru to Liverpool.
Sakhari	India	The ship was lost off Vakarai, Ceylon.
Tagus	United Kingdom	The steamship departed from Porto, Portugal for Liverpool. No further trace, presumed foundered with the loss of all 27 people on board.
Thomas Hunt	United States	The sealer was presumed lost with all hands on the return voyage from a sealing trip to Stonington, Maine.
Towkully	India	The ship collided with East Lothian (United Kingdom) and sank with the loss of two of her crew.
