= Adolphus (1852) =

Brigantine

History
- Name: Adolphus
- Owner: Mr Metcalf
- Port of registry: Sydney
- Builder: Unknown Miramichi, New Brunswick, Canada
- Completed: 1852
- Identification: Registration number: 135/1854; Official number: 32306
- Fate: Wrecked 29 November 1866

General characteristics
- Type: Wood Brigantine
- Tonnage: 121 GT
- Displacement: 121 NT
- Length: 22.98 m
- Beam: 5.669 m
- Draught: 3.048 m
- Installed power: NA

The Adolphus was a wooden brigantine that was wrecked on the rocks west of Pier Head at Wollongong harbour in New South Wales on 29 November 1866. The ship was carrying coal from Wollongong to Sydney under the command of Captain William Kean. There were no casualties, but the vessel was lost. The wreck has not been located, but the approximate coordinates are 34.4189°S 150.9071°E.
