= Roehampton (1852 ship) =

History

United Kingdom
- Name: Roehampton
- Namesake: Roehampton
- Builder: Booth & Blacklock, Sunderland
- Launched: 5 May 1852
- Fate: Foundered 3 March 1859

General characteristics
- Tons burthen: Old Act: 405 (bm); New Act (post 1836): 469 (bm)
- Sail plan: Barque

Roehampton was built in Sunderland on 5 May 1852. She sailed to India and Australia, and carried immigrants to New Zealand. She foundered on 3 March 1859 while participating in the guano trade from Peru.

== Career ==
Roehampton was registered in Newcastle. She first appeared in Lloyd's Register (LR) in 1852.

Year	Master	Owner	Trade	Source
1852	W.King	Beckwith & Co.	Sunderland–Calcutta	LR

Adelaide: Roehampton sailed from Calcutta on 2 February 1853 and arrived at Adelaide on 2 April. She sailed from Adelaide for Calcutta on 11 May.

New Zealand: Roehampton, Candler, master, sailed from London on 5 November 1857, bound for New Zealand with 112 migrants. She arrived at Lyttelton on 7 March 1858 and Port Chalmers on 3 April. She sailed from Otago on 18 April, bound for Guam, in ballast.

== Fate ==
Roehampton foundered in the Pacific Ocean on 3 March 1859. Her crew survived. She was on a voyage from Callao to the Chincha Islands, of the coast of Peru. The Chincha Islands were noted for their guano deposits.

In 1859, 118 ships left Peru with guano; four of these were lost. Anthony Gibes & Co. lost three. One of these was Roehampton.
