= National Register of Historic Places listings in Fulton County, Illinois =

Location of Fulton County in Illinois

This is a list of the National Register of Historic Places listings in Fulton County, Illinois.

This is intended to be a complete list of the properties and districts on the National Register of Historic Places in Fulton County, Illinois, United States. Latitude and longitude coordinates are provided for many National Register properties and districts; these locations may be seen together in a map.

There are 42 properties and districts listed on the National Register in the county. Another two properties were formerly listed but have been removed.

This National Park Service list is complete through NPS recent listings posted June 6, 2026.

== Current listings ==
	Name on the Register	Image	Date listed	Location	City or town	Description
1	Babylon Bend Bridge	Babylon Bend Bridge	October 29, 1980 (#80001355)	Illinois Route 123; 40°35′25″N 90°20′52″W	Ellisville	
2	Bernadotte Bridge	Bernadotte Bridge	October 29, 1980 (#80001360)	Illinois Route 2; 40°24′13″N 90°19′15″W	Smithfield	
3	Buckeye Bridge	Buckeye Bridge	October 29, 1980 (#80001361)	Spans Spoon River; 40°31′54″N 90°18′40″W	Smithfield	Replaced in 1994
4	Chicago, Burlington and Quincy Railroad Station	Chicago, Burlington and Quincy Railroad Station	August 31, 1993 (#93000842)	Along 4th Ave. between E. Elm St. and E. Chestnut St. 40°33′23″N 90°01′44″W	Canton	
5	Edith Chipman House	Edith Chipman House	November 7, 1996 (#96001290)	201 W. 3rd St. 40°17′43″N 90°25′44″W	Vermont	
6	Dickson Mounds	Dickson Mounds	May 5, 1972 (#72000457)	Off County Road 4; 40°21′03″N 90°06′31″W	Lewistown	
7	Robert Dilworth House	Robert Dilworth House	November 12, 1993 (#93001236)	606 E. 5th St. 40°17′39″N 90°25′11″W	Vermont	
8	Duncan Mills Bridge		October 29, 1980 (#80001356)	West of Havana; 40°20′28″N 90°11′27″W	Lewistown	Demolished.
9	William Franklin and Rebecca Durell House	William Franklin and Rebecca Durell House	November 7, 1996 (#96001292)	408 W. 5th St. 40°17′38″N 90°25′55″W	Vermont	
10	Duvall-Ash Farmstead		November 12, 1993 (#93001237)	Off Illinois Route 9, 1 mile east and 1.2 miles north of its junction with Illinois Route 97; 40°34′40″N 90°08′23″W	Fiatt	
11	East Waterford School	East Waterford School	November 10, 2009 (#09000897)	Junction of North Dickson Mounds Rd. and East Prairie Rd. 40°20′59″N 90°06′55″W	Lewistown	
12	Edward Hamer House	Edward Hamer House	November 7, 1996 (#96001293)	200 W. 2nd St. 40°17′48″N 90°25′45″W	Vermont	
13	Patterson Hamer House	Patterson Hamer House	November 7, 1996 (#96001287)	405 W. 5th St. 40°17′36″N 90°25′52″W	Vermont	
14	William Hoopes House	William Hoopes House	November 7, 1996 (#96001285)	204 N. Liberty St. 40°17′45″N 90°25′44″W	Vermont	
15	Lucinda Hunter House	Lucinda Hunter House	November 7, 1996 (#96001286)	101 E. 8th St. 40°17′26″N 90°25′38″W	Vermont	
16	Indian Ford Bridge	Indian Ford Bridge	October 29, 1980 (#80001357)	Illinois Route 20; 40°41′25″N 90°17′24″W	London Mills	Now demolished.
17	Larson Site	Larson Site	November 21, 1978 (#78001145)	Waterford Rd. north of the Waterford Cemetery; 40°20′36″N 90°07′52″W	Lewistown	
18	London Mills Bridge	London Mills Bridge	October 29, 1980 (#80001358)	Illinois Route 39; 40°42′36″N 90°16′00″W	London Mills	Now demolished.
19	Charles Emmor McCormick House	Charles Emmor McCormick House	November 7, 1996 (#96001284)	712 W. 3rd St. 40°17′45″N 90°26′05″W	Vermont	
20	Joab Mershon House	Joab Mershon House	November 7, 1996 (#96001294)	507 W. 5th St. 40°17′36″N 90°25′59″W	Vermont	
21	Daniel O'Connell House	Daniel O'Connell House	November 7, 1996 (#96001288)	115 N. Union St. 40°17′43″N 90°25′34″W	Vermont	
22	Oak Hill Cemetery	Oak Hill Cemetery	November 13, 1995 (#95001240)	1000 block of N. Main St. (Illinois Routes 97 and 100); 40°24′08″N 90°09′24″W	Lewistown	
23	Odd Fellows Opera Block	Odd Fellows Opera Block	August 8, 1996 (#96000876)	Southwestern corner of the junction of Main and Mechanic Sts. 40°37′36″N 90°18′16″W	Ellisville	
24	Ogden-Fettie Site	Ogden-Fettie Site	July 31, 1972 (#72000458)	South of Lewistown; 40°20′27″N 90°07′06″W	Lewistown	
25	Orendorf Site		September 13, 1977 (#77000484)	Western side of U.S. Route 24 near the northern end of the Duck Creek Cooling Pond; 40°29′15″N 89°57′06″W	Canton	
26	Ulysses G. Orendorff House	Ulysses G. Orendorff House	December 9, 1971 (#71000292)	345 W. Elm St. 40°33′25″N 90°02′33″W	Canton	
27	Henry H. Page House	Henry H. Page House	November 7, 1996 (#96001289)	221 N. Union St. 40°17′46″N 90°25′34″W	Vermont	
28	Hiram Palmer House	Hiram Palmer House	May 20, 1999 (#99000589)	703 E. Fort St. 40°41′53″N 89°59′38″W	Farmington	
29	Parlin Library	Parlin Library	May 6, 1994 (#94000434)	210 E. Chestnut St. 40°33′24″N 90°01′53″W	Canton	
30	Harvey Lee Ross House	Harvey Lee Ross House	November 7, 1996 (#96001295)	602 S. Main St. 40°17′20″N 90°25′41″W	Vermont	
31	Seville Bridge	Seville Bridge	October 29, 1980 (#80001359)	Spans the Spoon River in Seville; 40°28′22″N 90°17′27″W	Seville	
32	Sheets Site		December 22, 1978 (#78001146)	County Road 14, west of Lewistown; 40°24′01″N 90°12′40″W	Lewistown	
33	Sleeth Site	Sleeth Site	May 17, 1979 (#79000837)	Northeast of the junction of U.S. Route 24 and Pollitt Rd. 40°25′27″N 90°00′00″W	Liverpool	
34	Elsworth Snowden House		November 7, 1996 (#96001283)	504 W. 3rd St. 40°17′44″N 90°26′00″W	Vermont	
35	South Fulton Churchhouse	South Fulton Churchhouse	October 28, 1994 (#94001264)	2.2 miles south of the junction of Astoria-Bader Rd. and U.S. Route 24; 40°11′45″N 90°21′26″W	Astoria	
36	St. James Episcopal Church	St. James Episcopal Church	December 31, 1974 (#74000761)	Northeastern corner of the junction of MacArthur and Broadway; 40°23′56″N 90°09′06″W	Lewistown	
37	Stapleford-Hoover-Whitney House	Stapleford-Hoover-Whitney House	November 7, 1996 (#96001291)	401 N. Main St. 40°17′51″N 90°25′38″W	Vermont	
38	Table Grove Community Church	Table Grove Community Church	February 9, 1979 (#79003783)	N. Broadway and W. Liberty Sts. 40°22′00″N 90°25′32″W	Table Grove	
39	Tampico Mounds		May 14, 1979 (#79000838)	West of the junction of U.S. Route 24 and County Road 8; 40°24′58″N 90°00′56″W	Maples Mill	
40	Tartar's Ferry Bridge	Tartar's Ferry Bridge	October 29, 1980 (#80001363)	Spans the Spoon River southwest of Smithfield; 40°26′47″N 90°21′02″W	Smithfield	
41	Vermont Historic District	Vermont Historic District	November 24, 1997 (#97001334)	Roughly bounded by 2nd, Union, 4th, and Liberty Sts. 40°17′42″N 90°25′40″W	Vermont	
42	Vermont Masonic Hall	Vermont Masonic Hall	November 16, 1988 (#88002236)	N. Main St. 40°17′42″N 90°25′39″W	Vermont	

== Former listings ==
	Name on the Register	Image	Date listed	Date removed	Location	City or town	Description
1	Carithers Store Building	Carithers Store Building	August 3, 1987 (#87001262)	January 6, 2020	Table Grove village square, west of U.S. Route 136; 40°21′58″N 90°25′32″W	Table Grove	
2	Elrod Bridge		October 29, 1980 (#80001362)	December 8, 1995	Southeast of Smithville spanning the Spoon River; 40°23′29″N 90°15′16″W	Smithfield	Destroyed by an F4 tornado on May 13, 1995.

== See also ==
- List of National Historic Landmarks in Illinois
- National Register of Historic Places listings in Illinois
