= Whitney House =

Whitney House or Whitney Mansion may refer to:

in the United States (by state then city)

- Whitney Section House, Wasilla, Alaska, listed on the NRHP in Matanuska-Susitna Borough, Alaska
- J. T. Whitney Funeral Home, Phoenix, Arizona, listed on the NRHP in Phoenix, Arizona
- Grant Whitney House, Payette, Idaho, listed on the NRHP in Payette County, Idaho
- Stapleford-Hoover-Whitney House, Vermont, Illinois, listed on the NRHP in Fulton County, Illinois
- Col. Nathan Whitney House, Franklin Grove, Illinois, listed on the NRHP in Lee County, Illinois
- William Whitney House, Hinsdale, Illinois, listed on the NRHP in DuPage County, Illinois
- Whitney Ranch Historic District, Hymer, Kansas, listed on the NRHP in Chase County, Kansas
- Andrew M. Whitney House and Barn, Scottsville, Kentucky, listed on the NRHP in Allen County, Kentucky
- Whitney Plantation Historic District, Wallace, Louisiana, listed on the NRHP in St. John the Baptist Parish, Louisiana
- Capt. Joel Whitney House, Phillips, Maine, listed on the NRHP in Franklin County, Maine
- Israel Whitney House, Needham, Massachusetts, listed on the NRHP in Massachusetts
- Walcott-Whitney House, Stow, Massachusetts, listed on the NRHP in Massachusetts
- Whitney-Farrington-Cook House, Waltham, Massachusetts, listed on the NRHP in Massachusetts
- David Whitney House, Detroit, Michigan, listed on the NRHP in Michigan
- Hale-Whitney Mansion, Bayonne, New Jersey, listed on the NRHP in Hudson County, New Jersey
- Whitney Mansion (Glassboro, New Jersey), listed on the National Register of Historic Places in Gloucester County, New Jersey
- Whitney Mansion (Loudonville, New York), listed on the NRHP in Albany County, New York
- Whitney Mansion (Niagara Falls, New York), listed on the National Register of Historic Places in Niagara County, New York
- George W. Whitney House, Berea, Ohio, listed on the NRHP in Cuyahoga County, Ohio
- Mary Whitney House, Spearfish, South Dakota, listed on the NRHP in Lawrence County, South Dakota
- James F. & Mary Jane Whitney House, Mendon, Utah, listed on the NRHP in Cache County, Utah
