= Hamer =

Hamer may refer to:

== Places ==
- Hamer (woreda), Ethiopia
- Hamer, Iran
- Hamer, Lancashire, United Kingdom
- Hamer, Idaho, United States
- Hamer, Ohio, United States
- Hamer, South Carolina, United States

== Other uses ==
- Hamer (surname)
- Hamar people, who live in Ethiopia
- Hamer language, language of the Hamer people
- Hamer Guitars, American manufacturing company of electric guitars
- Hamer v. Sidway, a noted 1891 New York court case

== See also ==
- Hamer Hall (disambiguation)
- Hamer House (disambiguation)
- Hammer, a kind of tool
- Hammer (disambiguation)
