= Chipman House =

Chipman House may refer to:

- Edith Chipman House, Vermont, Illinois
- Chipman House (Falmouth, Kentucky), listed on the National Register of Historic Places
- Exercise Conant House, also known as the Reverend John Chipman House, Beverly, Massachusetts
- Delbert and Ora Chipman House, American Fork, Utah
- Henry & Elizabeth Parker Chipman House, American Fork, Utah
