= Hamer House =

Hamer House may refer to:

- Edward Hamer House, Vermont, Illinois, listed on the NRHP in Fulton County, Illinois
- Patterson Hamer House, Vermont, Illinois, listed on the NRHP in Fulton County, Illinois
- James W. Hamer House, Little Rock, South Carolina, NRHP-listed

== See also ==
- Hamer Hall (disambiguation)
- Hamer's General Store, Mechanicsburg, Ohio, listed on the NRHP in Champaign County, Ohio
