= Thomas & Elizabeth Coddington House =

Historic house in Utah, United States

- U.S. National Register of Historic Places
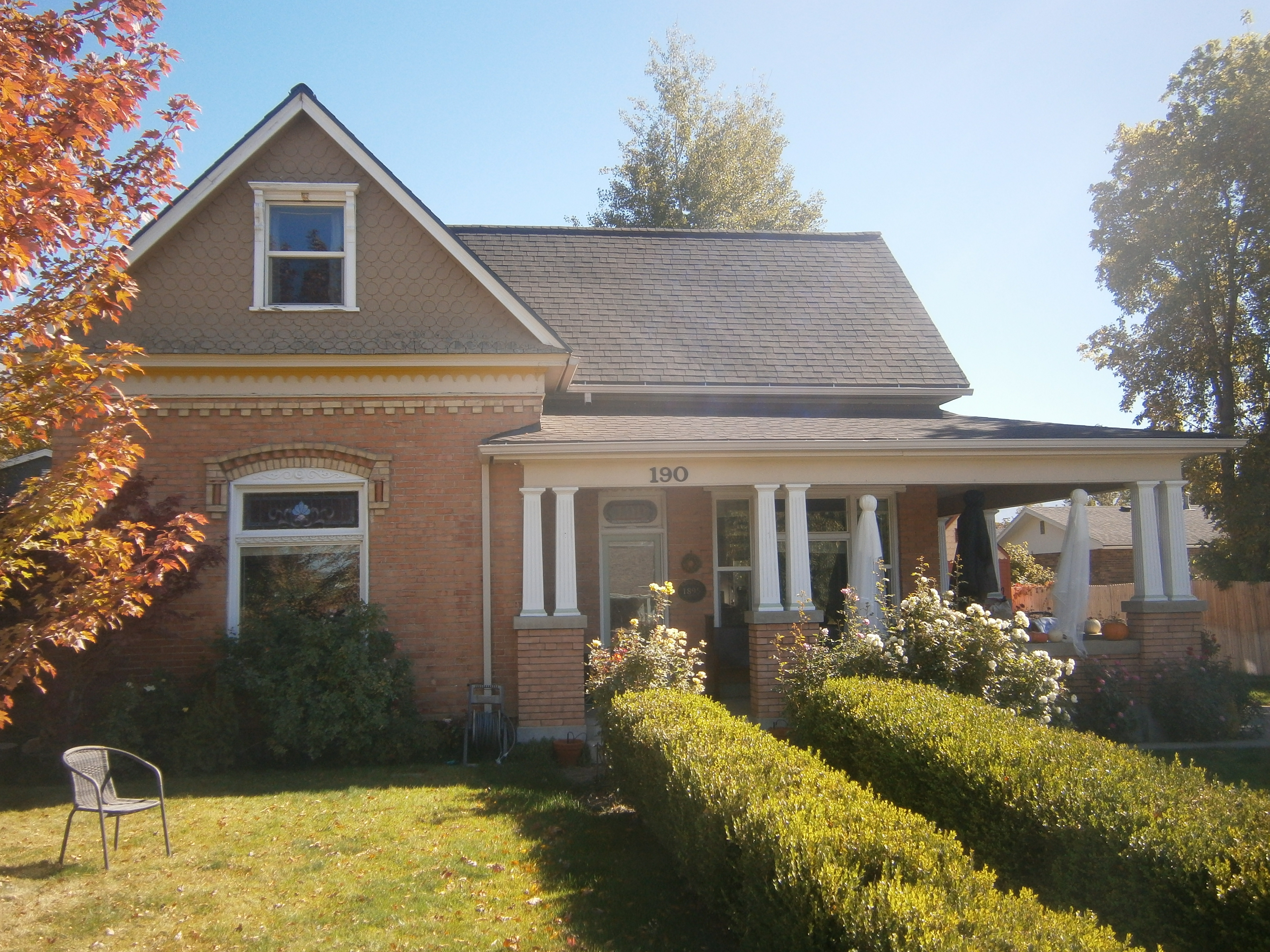

- Location within Utah Location within the United States
- Location: 190 N. 300 E., American Fork, Utah
- Coordinates: 40°22′50″N 111°47′25″W
- Area: less than one acre
- Built: 1898
- Architectural style: Late Victorian
- NRHP reference No.: 100001982
- Added to NRHP: January 18, 2018

Thomas & Elizabeth Coddington House on N. 300 W. in American Fork, Utah was built in 1898. It was listed on the National Register of Historic Places in 2018. The listing included one contributing building.

It includes Late Victorian architecture.

The Delbert and Ora Chipman House and Henry & Elizabeth Parker Chipman House, also in American Fork, are also NRHP-listed.
