= Joab (name) =

Joab is a masculine given name. Notable people with the name include:

- Joab H. Banton (1869–1949), American lawyer, District Attorney of New York County
- Joab Brace (1781–April 20, 1861), American Congregationalist minister
- Joab Hoisington (1736–1777), American Revolution patriot
- Joab Houghton (1811–1876), American lawyer and judge
- Joab Lawler (1796–1838), American politician from Alabama
- Joab Mzamane (1920–1989), South African agriculturalist
- Joab Omino (1960–2004), Kenyan politician, diplomat and footballer
- Joab N. Patterson (1835–1923) , American army officer and politician
- Joab Schneiter (born 1998), Swiss cyclist
- Joab Thomas (1933–2014), American university administrator and scientist

== See also ==
- Job (given name)
- Joab Mershon House, Vermont, Illinois, United States
- Sachin Joab, Australian actor
- Yoav, given name
