= Vermont Historic District =

Historic district in Illinois, United States

- U.S. National Register of Historic Places
- U.S. Historic district
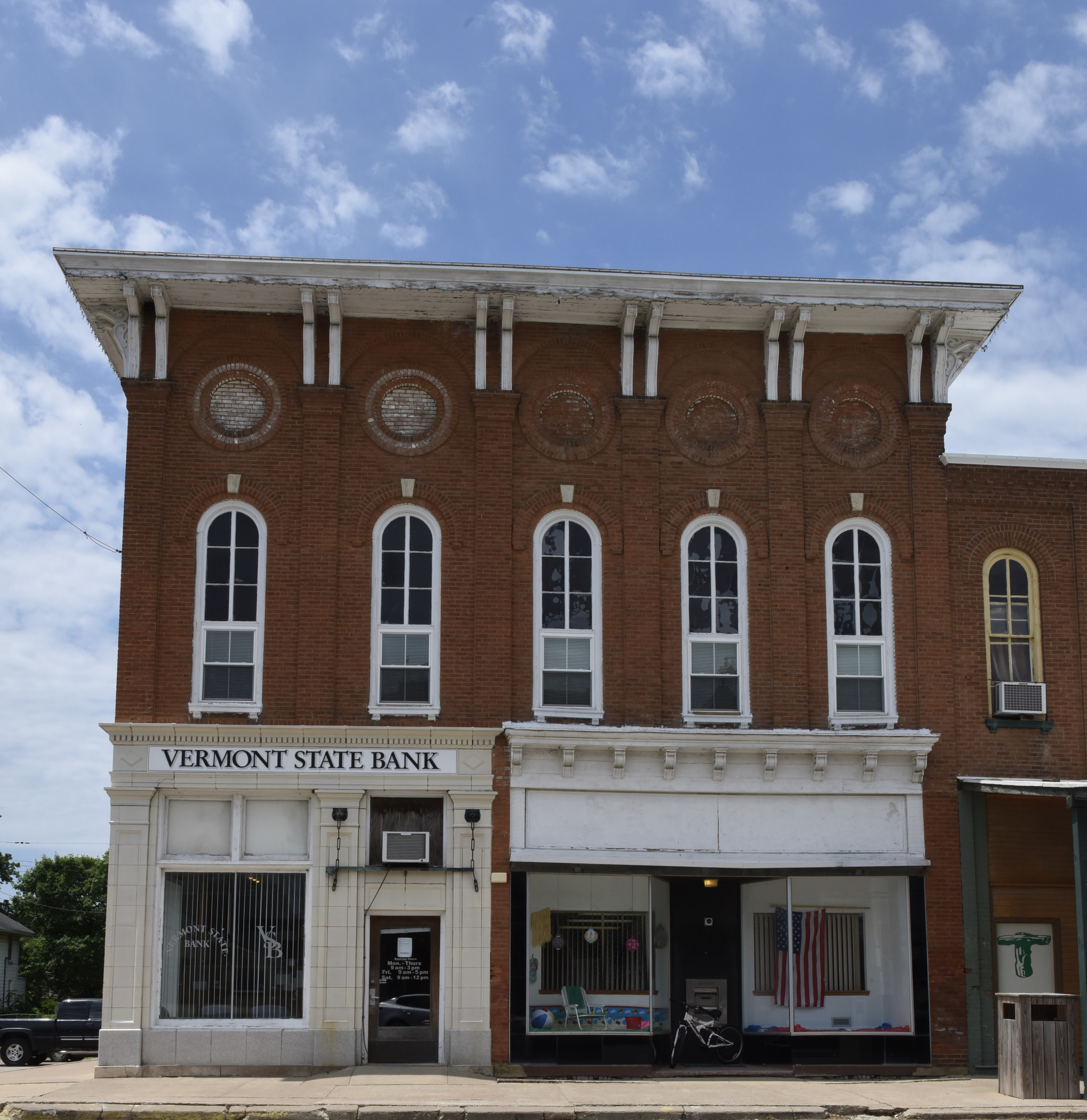
- Vermont State Bank

- Location within Illinois Location within the United States
- Location: Roughly bounded by Second, Union, Fourth, and Liberty Sts., Vermont, Illinois
- Coordinates: 40°17′42″N 90°25′40″W
- Area: 7.1 acres (2.9 ha)
- Architectural style: Greek Revival, Italianate, Late Victorian, Commercial
- MPS: Vermont, Illinois MPS
- NRHP reference No.: 97001334
- Added to NRHP: November 24, 1997

The Vermont Historic District is a national historic district located in downtown Vermont, Illinois. The district encompasses the commercial core of the village around Vermont's public square and along Main Street to the north; it includes 30 buildings, 23 of which are contributing buildings. The buildings in downtown Vermont functioned as the village's shopping and entertainment district as well as the home of fraternal halls such as the Vermont Masonic Hall. While commercial development in Vermont began in the 1840s, the oldest surviving building in the district dates to circa 1858; the building has a Greek Revival design, as was common among Vermont's early commercial buildings. A major building boom took place in the late 1860s and 1870s due to the village's rising population and railroad service; most buildings from this period have Italianate designs. Another building boom in the late 1880s and early 1890s brought several new Late Victorian buildings to the district. After the turn of the century, a number of Commercial style buildings were constructed as well.

The district was added to the National Register of Historic Places on November 24, 1997.
