= Churchhouse =

Churchhouse may refer to:

- Robert Churchhouse (1927–2018), English academic
- South Fulton Churchhouse

== See also ==
- Church house
