= Duvall–Ash Farmstead =

- U.S. National Register of Historic Places
- Location within Illinois Location within the United States
- Location: Off Illinois Route 9, 1-mile (1.6 km) east and 1.2 miles (1.9 km) north of its junction with Illinois Route 97
- Nearest city: Fiatt, Illinois
- Coordinates: 40°34′40″N 90°8′23″W
- Area: 10 acres (4.0 ha)
- Architectural style: Late Gothic Revival, Late Victorian
- NRHP reference No.: 93001237
- Added to NRHP: November 12, 1993

The Duvall–Ash Farmstead is a historic farm located northeast of Fiatt in Fulton County, Illinois. Edward Duvall built the farm's oldest buildings, the house and smokehouse, circa 1848. Duvall gave the farmhouse a Gothic Revival design with multiple front-facing gables decorated with bargeboards and topped by finials. In the 1890s, Singleton K. Ash purchased and extensively renovated the farm. Ash placed a Victorian addition on the rear of the house which featured decorative stickwork and bracketing. In addition, Ash and his family built most of the farm's current outbuildings, which include a chicken coop, barns, and storage sheds; these outbuildings form a complete collection of typical outbuildings from an 1890s farm.

The farm was added to the National Register of Historic Places on November 12, 1993.
