= William Hoopes House =

Historic house in Illinois, United States

- U.S. National Register of Historic Places
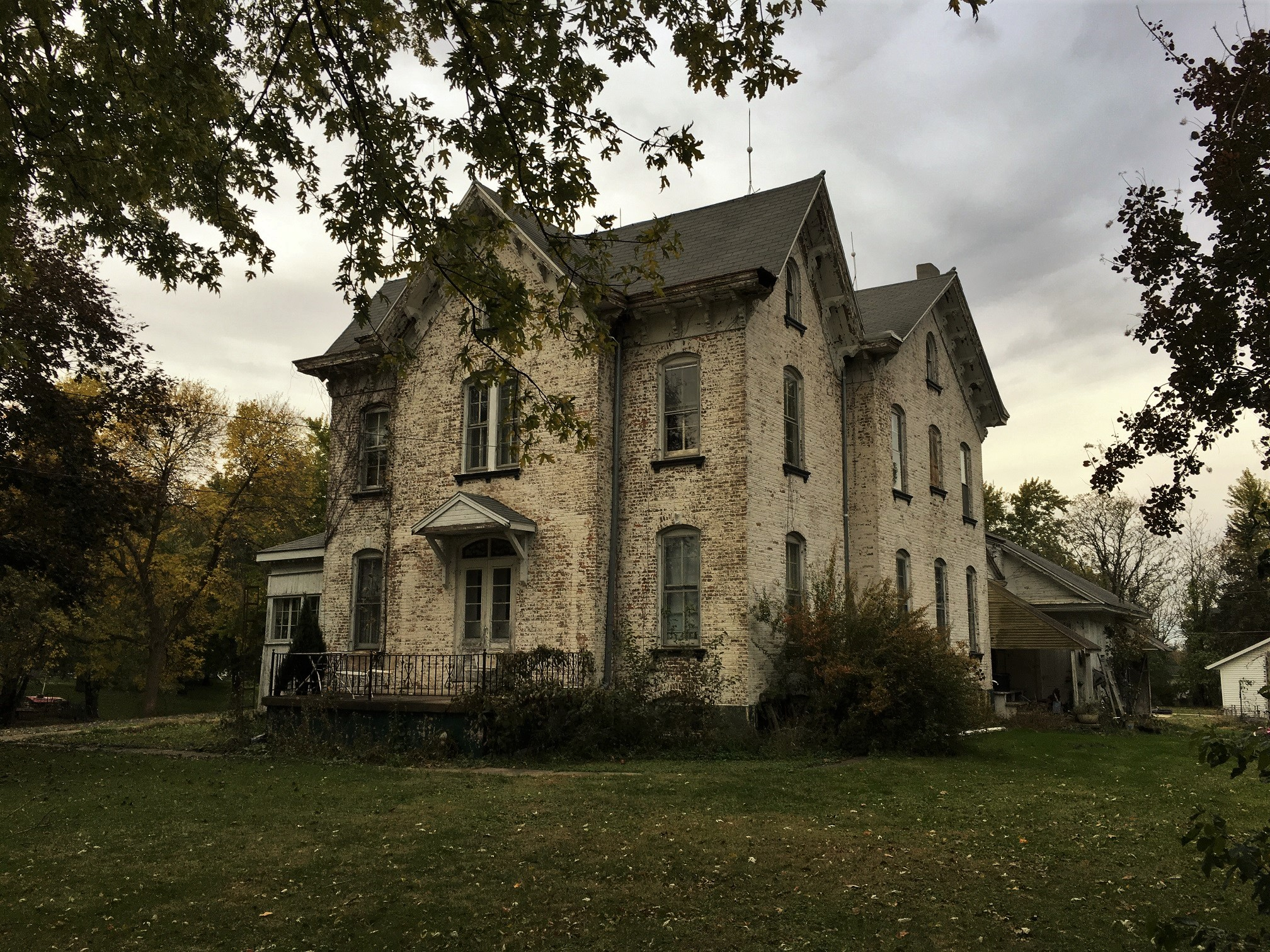

- Location within Illinois Location within the United States
- Location: 204 N. Liberty St. Vermont, Illinois
- Coordinates: 40°17′45″N 90°25′44″W
- Area: less than one acre
- Built: 1898
- Built by: Myers, William
- Architectural style: Queen Anne, T-plan
- MPS: Vermont, Illinois MPS
- NRHP reference No.: 96001285
- Added to NRHP: November 7, 1996

The William Hoopes House is a historic house located at 204 North Liberty Street in Vermont, Illinois. William Hoopes, a local wagon maker, brickworks owner, and Civil War veteran, had the house built for his family in 1898. Local carpenter William Myers built the house in a T-plan, a vernacular type defined by its T-shaped cross gabled roof and floor plan. The house also includes several Queen Anne decorative elements, such as the smaller gable inside its front gable, its three-sided bay window, and its front porch with ornamental spindlework.

The house was added to the National Register of Historic Places on November 7, 1996.
