= Elsworth Snowden House =

Historic house in Illinois, United States

- U.S. National Register of Historic Places
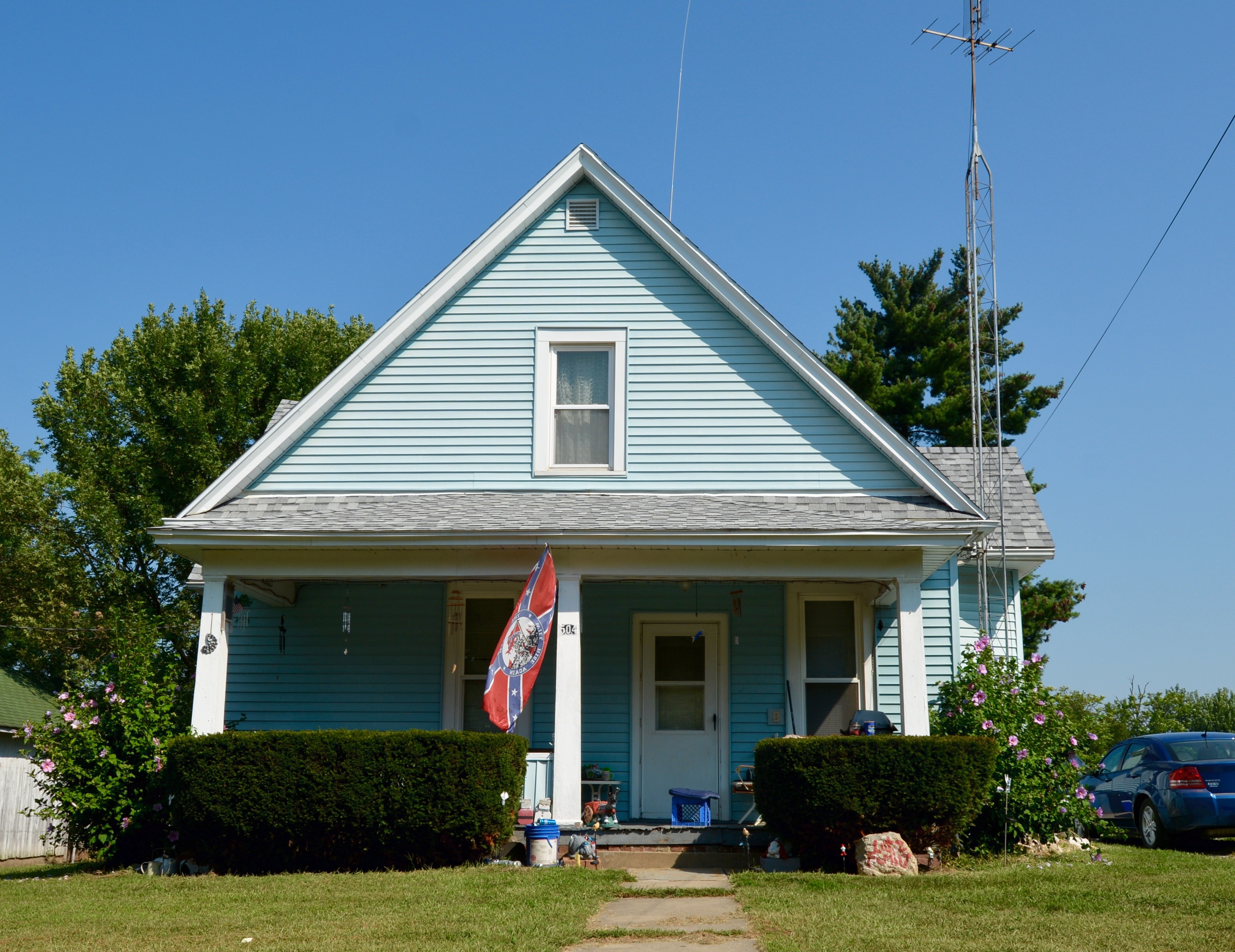
- The photo shows 504 W 3rd Street, the Snowden house is a few doors down.

- Location within Illinois Location within the United States
- Location: 610 W 3rd St., Vermont, Illinois
- Coordinates: 40°17′44″N 90°26′0″W
- Area: 3.5 acres (1.4 ha)
- Built: 1908
- Built by: Rankin, Fred
- Architectural style: Cross Plan, Queen Anne
- MPS: Vermont, Illinois MPS
- NRHP reference No.: 96001283
- Added to NRHP: November 7, 1996

The Elsworth Snowden House is a historic house located at 610 West 3rd Street in Vermont, Illinois. The house was built in 1908 for farmers Elsworth and Susan Snowden. Contractor Fred Rankin built the house, which has a vernacular Cross Plan. The Cross Plan is typified by a cross-shaped floor plan with a complex roof form; this was exhibited in the house's cross-gabled main roof with a hipped roof over the front entrance and a shed roof over the porch. The house also features decorative elements such as its egg-and-dart molding and glass panels above the entrance and Queen Anne-inspired fish scale shingles.

The house was added to the National Register of Historic Places on 7 November 1996 with the wrong address: 504 West 3rd Street.
