= Lucinda Hunter House =

Historic house in Illinois, United States

- U.S. National Register of Historic Places
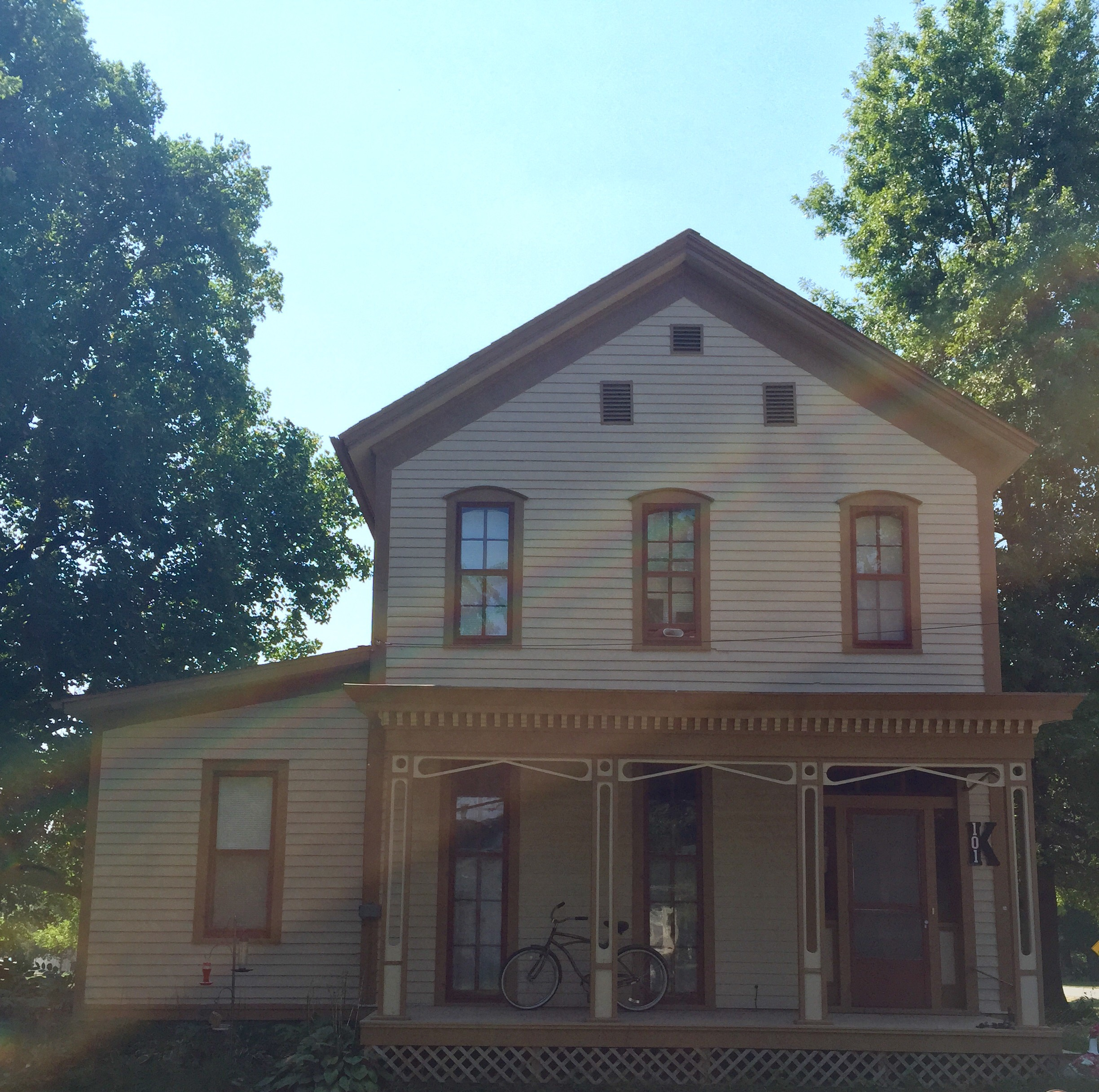

- Location within Illinois Location within the United States
- Location: 101 E. 8th St., Vermont, Illinois
- Coordinates: 40°17′26″N 90°25′38″W
- Area: less than one acre
- Architectural style: Greek Revival, Italianate, gable front
- MPS: Vermont, Illinois MPS
- NRHP reference No.: 96001286
- Added to NRHP: November 7, 1996

The Lucinda Hunter House is a historic house located at 101 East 8th Street in Vermont, Illinois, United States. The house was built in the early 1870s for Lucinda Hunter, the mother of village postmaster John Hiram Hunter. The house is an example of the Gable Front type of the Side Hall plan, a vernacular style popular for much of the 19th century. The Side Hall plan as exhibited in the house features two rooms on each story connected by a hall to the side; the Gable Front type reflects its roof form, a gable roof with a front-facing gable. Elements of several popular architectural styles decorate the house, such as the Greek Revival entrance, Italianate arched windows, and Gothic pointed arches on the porch.

The house was added to the National Register of Historic Places on November 7, 1996.
