= William Franklin and Rebecca Durell House =

Historic house in Illinois, United States

- U.S. National Register of Historic Places
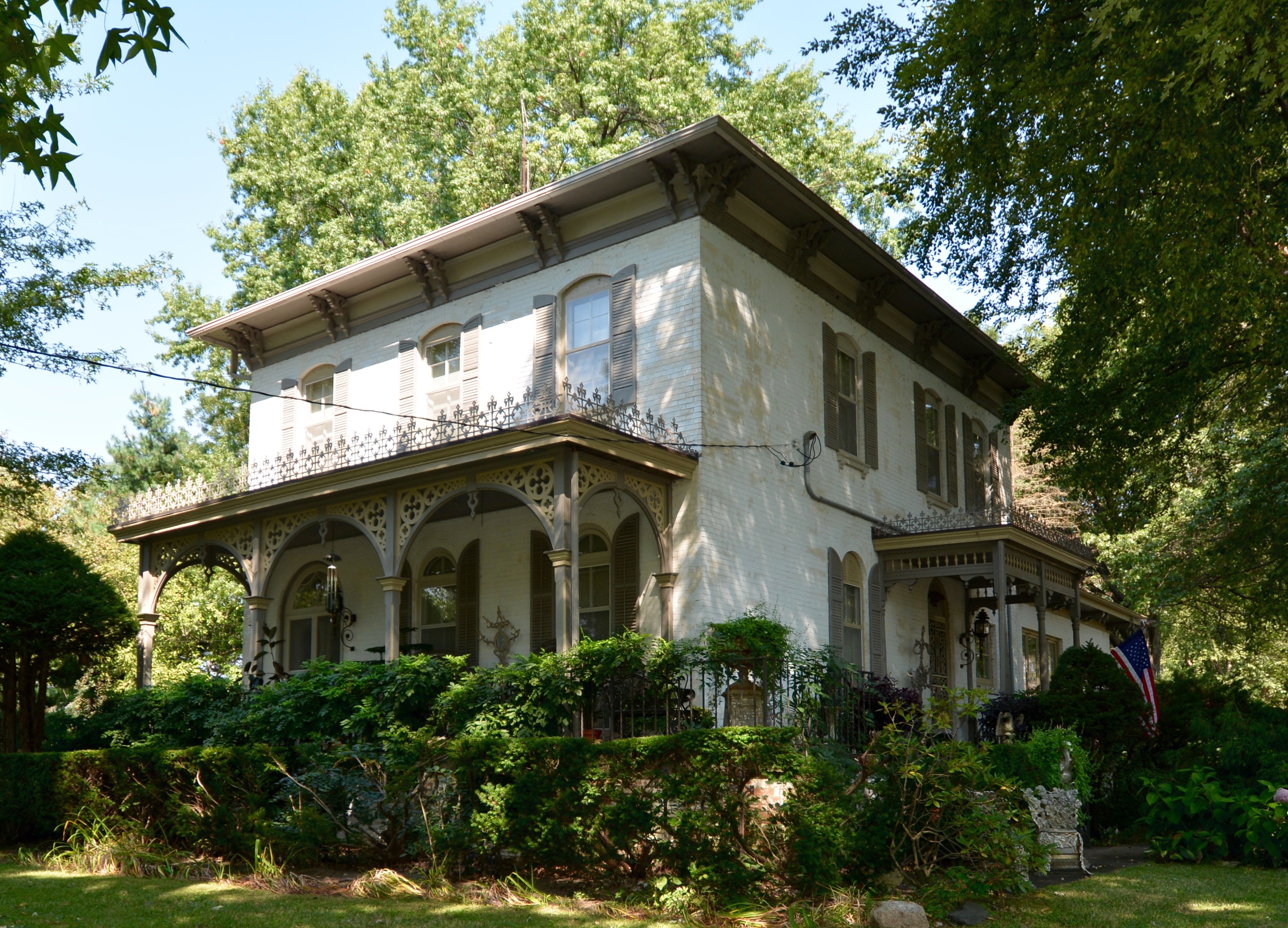

- Location within Illinois Location within the United States
- Location: 408 W. 5th St., Vermont, Illinois
- Coordinates: 40°17′38″N 90°25′55″W
- Area: less than one acre
- Built: 1872
- Architectural style: Italianate
- MPS: Vermont, Illinois MPS
- NRHP reference No.: 96001292
- Added to NRHP: November 7, 1996

The William Franklin and Rebecca Durell House is a historic house located at 408 West 5th Street in Vermont, Illinois. Local businessman William Franklin Durell and his wife Rebecca had the house built in 1872; at the time, West 5th Street was a desirable neighborhood for prominent Vermont residents known as "The Lane". The couple's house is designed in the Italianate style. Decorative porches project from the house at the front entrance and on the east side, and the house's windows are tall and narrow with segmental arched tops. The house's low hip roof features a cornice with paired brackets. A Victorian-inspired carriage house with a cross gable plan and a cupola is also part of the property.

The house was added to the National Register of Historic Places on November 7, 1996.
