= Henry H. Page House =

Historic house in Illinois, United States

- U.S. National Register of Historic Places
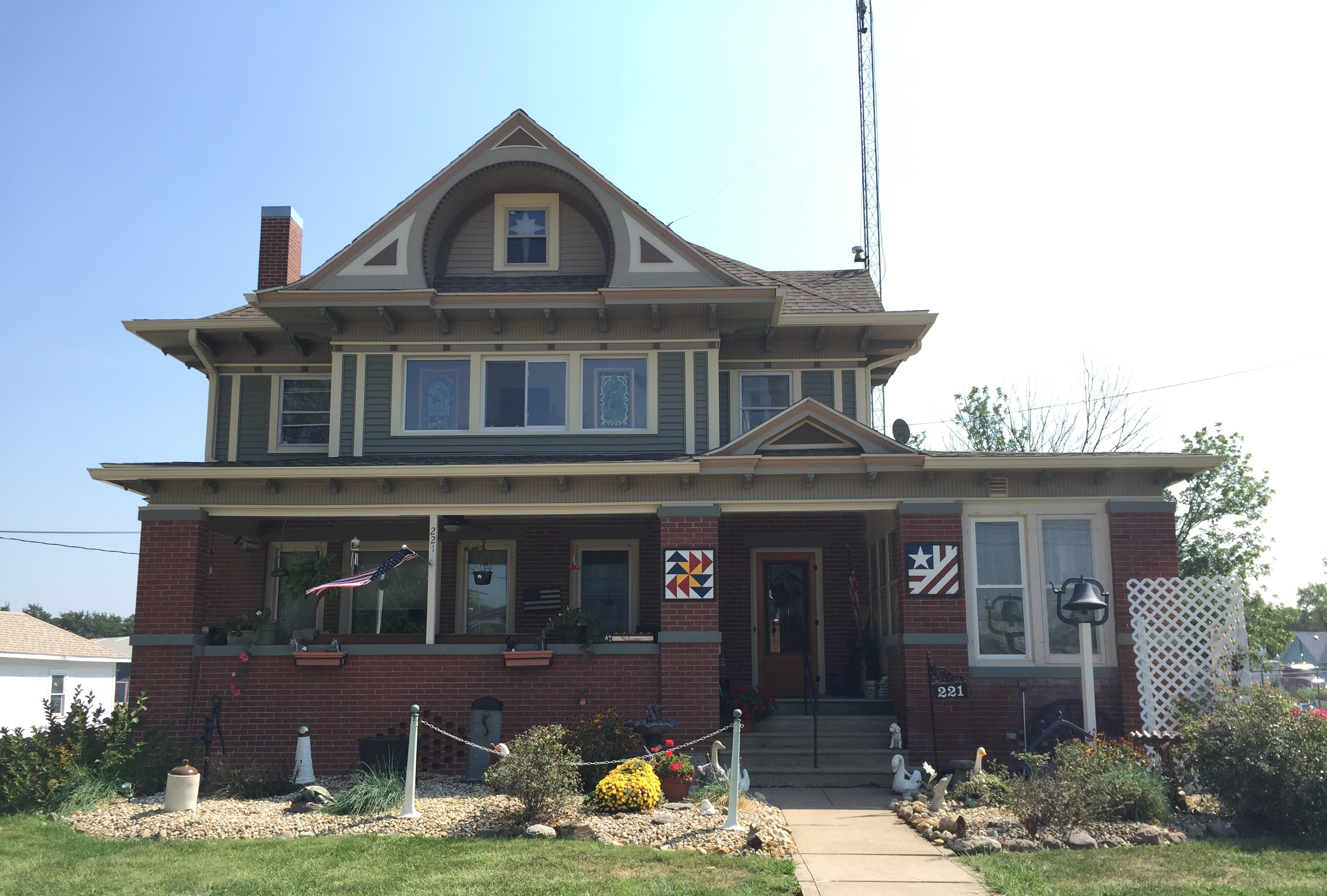

- Location within Illinois Location within the United States
- Location: 221 N. Union St., Vermont, Illinois
- Coordinates: 40°17′46″N 90°25′34″W
- Area: less than one acre
- Built: 1912-1913
- Architectural style: Classical Revival, Queen Anne, Craftsman
- MPS: Vermont, Illinois MPS
- NRHP reference No.: 96001289
- Added to NRHP: November 7, 1996

The Henry H. Page House is a historic house located at 221 North Union Street in Vermont, Illinois. Horse breeder Henry H. Page had the house built for his family in 1912–13. The house's design reflects a contemporary trend which architectural historian Alan Gowans described as Picturesque Eclectic; while its form distinctly fits a recognizable style, in its case the American Foursquare, its ornamentation borrows from multiple different styles. The large front gable dormer, which includes a horseshoe arch opening and decorated spandrels, is a Queen Anne feature. The cornice features both bracketing and stickwork, decorative elements of the Italianate and Stick styles respectively. The brick piers supporting the front porch come from the American Craftsman style, while the leaded windows are Classical Revival elements.

The house was added to the National Register of Historic Places on November 7, 1996.
