= Robert Dilworth House =

Historic house in Illinois, United States

- U.S. National Register of Historic Places
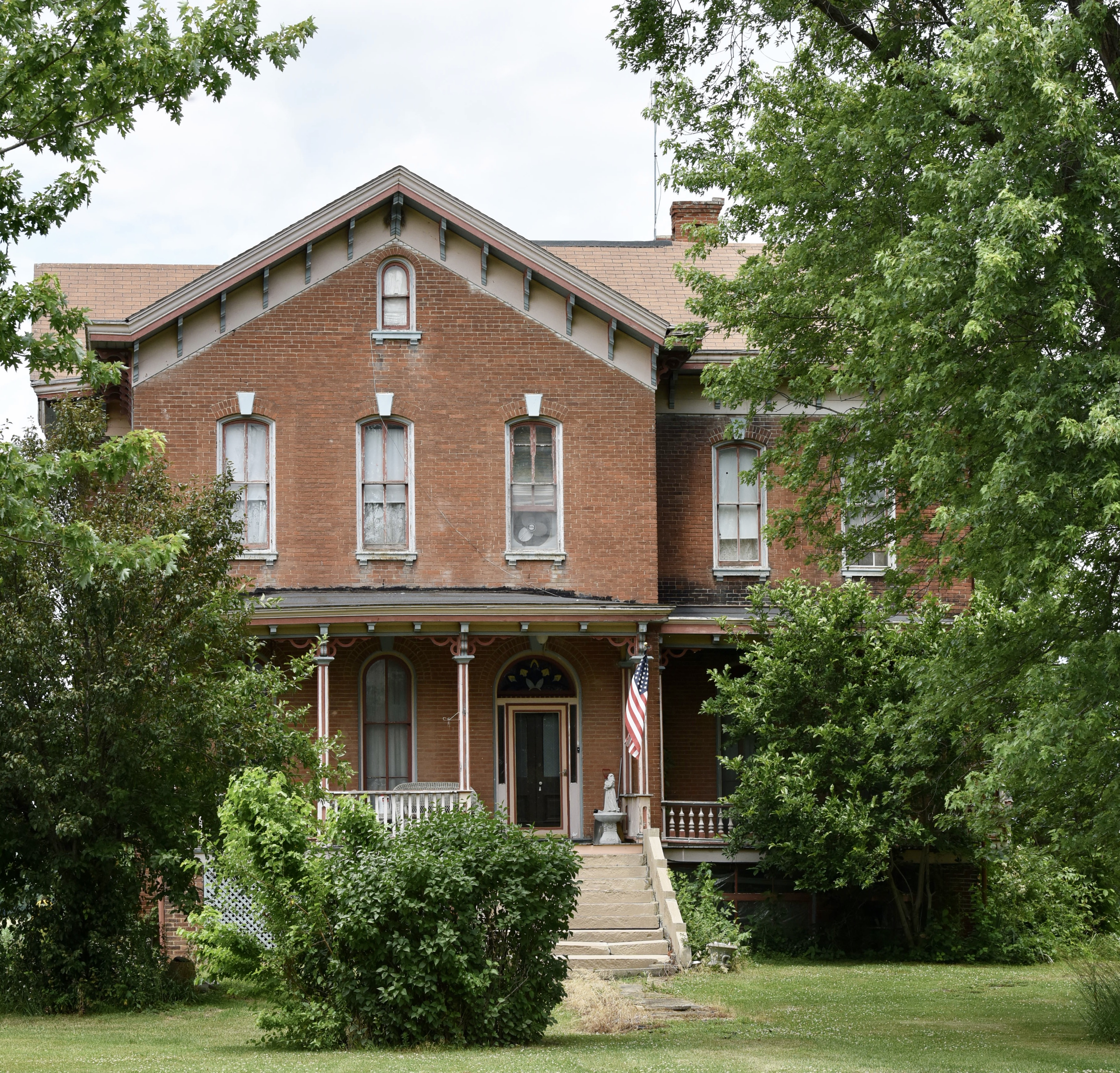

- Location within Illinois Location within the United States
- Location: 606 E. Fifth St., Vermont, Illinois
- Coordinates: 40°17′39″N 90°25′11″W
- Area: 3 acres (1.2 ha)
- Built: 1872
- Built by: Chapman, S.S., & Sons
- Architectural style: Italianate
- NRHP reference No.: 93001236
- Added to NRHP: November 12, 1993

The Robert Dilworth House is a historic house located at 606 East Fifth Street in Vermont, Illinois. The house was built in 1872 for Robert Dilworth, a local banker, politician, and pharmacist. The house was designed in the Italianate style, a nationally popular architectural style at the time. The main entrance is situated behind a full-length front porch supported by beveled columns; the front door itself has a decorative wooden surround and is topped by a transom. The house's windows are tall, narrow, and topped by arches, as is common in Italianate architecture. The gable roof has a front-facing gable adorned by decorative brackets along its eaves.

The house was added to the National Register of Historic Places on November 12, 1993.
