= Daniel O'Connell House =

Historic house in Illinois, United States

- U.S. National Register of Historic Places
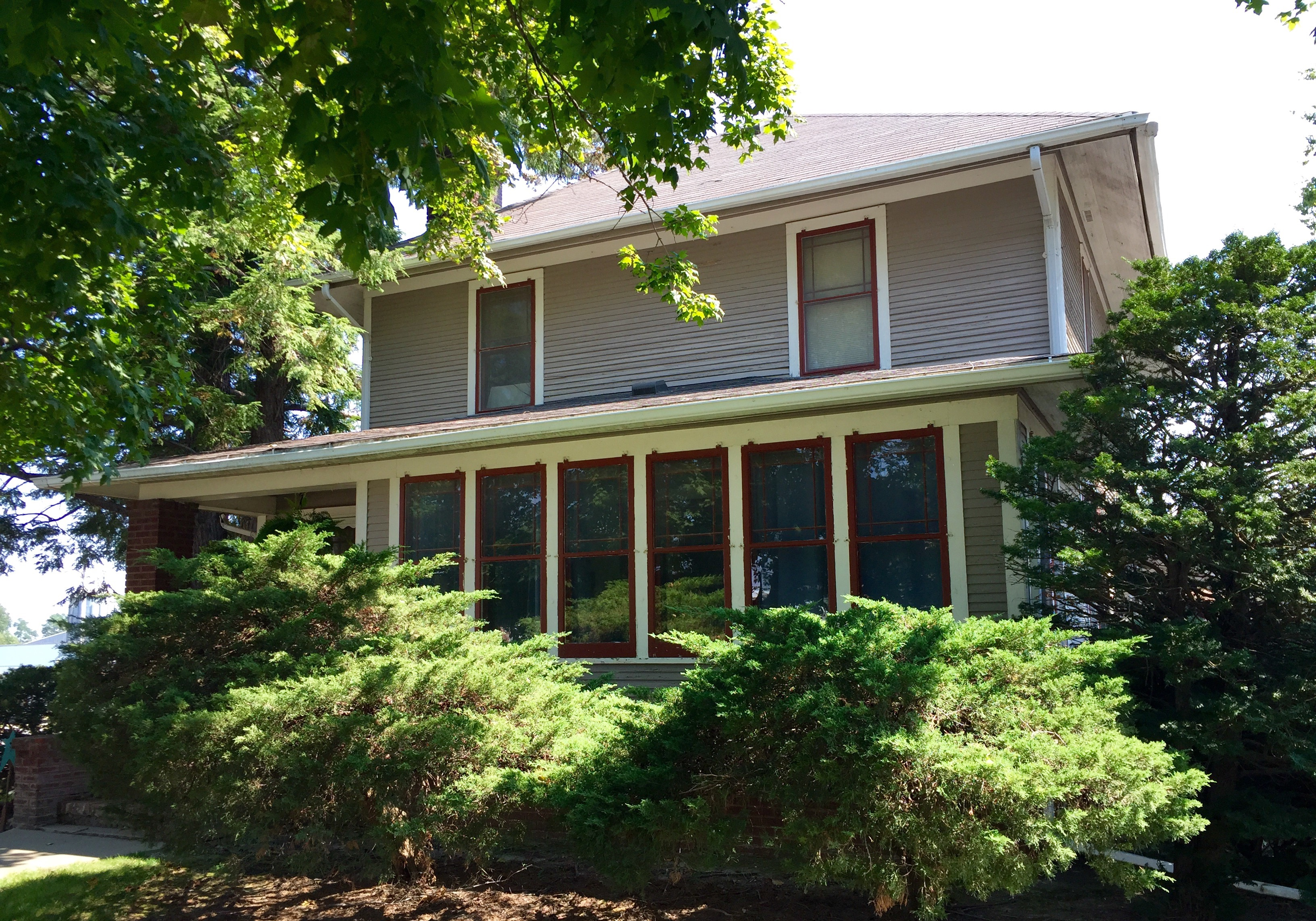

- Location within Illinois Location within the United States
- Location: 115 N. Union St., Vermont, Illinois
- Coordinates: 40°17′43″N 90°25′34″W
- Area: less than one acre
- Built: 1928
- Built by: Rankin, Fred; Brinton, Harvey
- Architectural style: American Craftsman, American Foursquare
- MPS: Vermont, Illinois MPS
- NRHP reference No.: 96001288
- Added to NRHP: November 7, 1996

The Daniel O'Connell House is a historic house located at 115 North Union Street in Vermont, Illinois. Daniel O'Connell, a local banker and lumber salesman, had the house built in 1928. The house, which was built by contractor Fred Rankin, has an American Foursquare plan with American Craftsman elements. The Foursquare plan, which had become popular at the time for its simplicity, is reflected in the house's square shape and massiveness. The brick piers at the entrance and the horizontal emphasis of the exterior design both reflect the Craftsman style; the style also inspired several interior elements, such as seating and shelves, which are built into the home.

The house was added to the National Register of Historic Places on November 7, 1996.
