= Charles Emmor McCormick House =

Historic house in Illinois, United States

- U.S. National Register of Historic Places
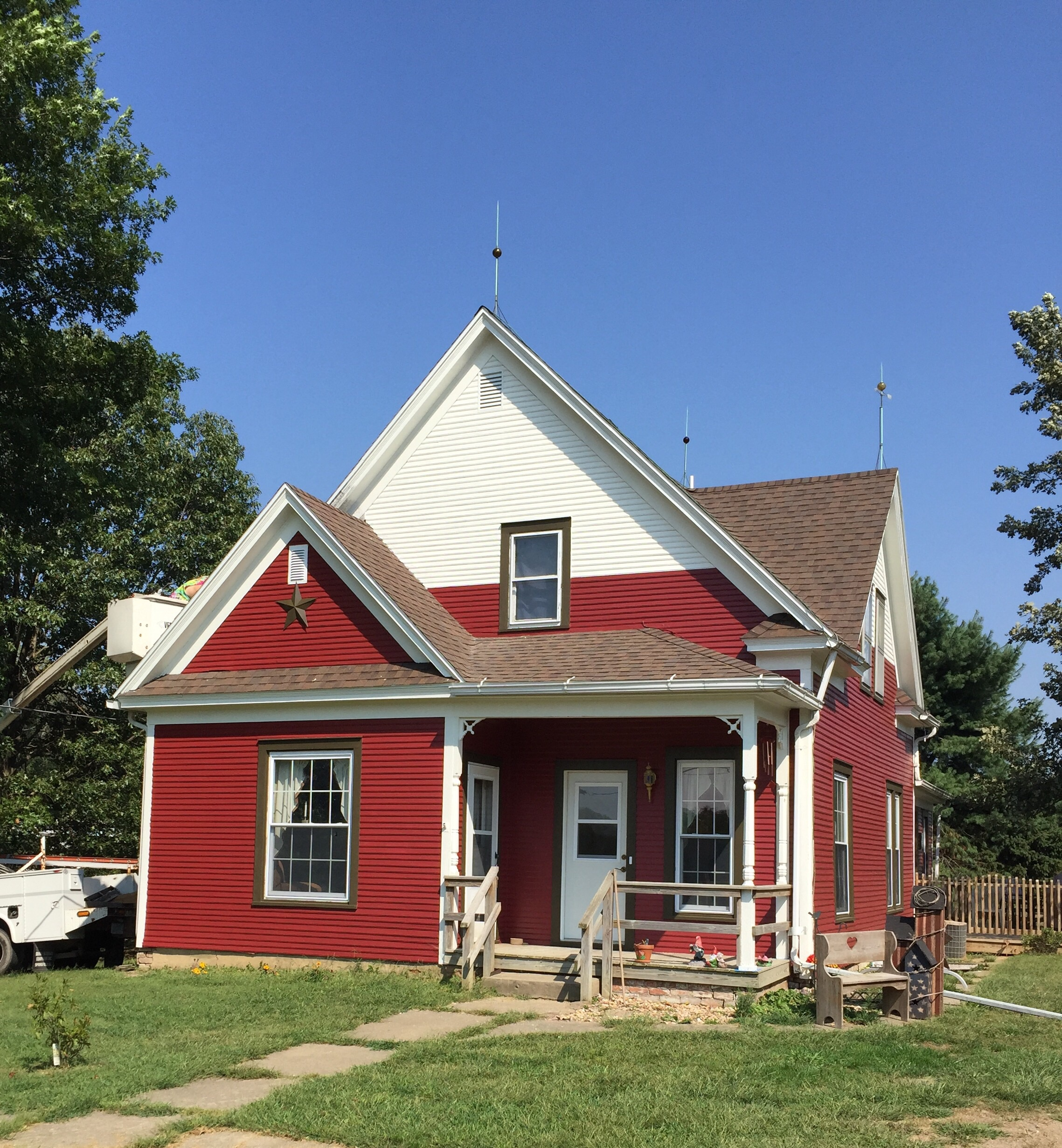

- Location within Illinois Location within the United States
- Location: 712 W. 3rd St., Vermont, Illinois
- Coordinates: 40°17′45″N 90°26′5″W
- Area: less than one acre
- Built: 1900
- Built by: Frazier, Daniel S.
- Architectural style: Queen Anne, gable front
- MPS: Vermont, Illinois MPS
- NRHP reference No.: 96001284
- Added to NRHP: November 7, 1996

The Charles Emmor McCormick House is a historic house located at 712 West 3rd Street in Vermont, Illinois. Contractor Daniel S. Frazier built the house in 1900 for farmer Charles Emmor McCormick and his family. The house has a Gable Front plan, a common inexpensive home plan at the time which was characterized by its front-facing gable. The Gable Front plan allowed for a variety of floor plans and decorative styles; the McCormick house has an irregular plan and is two rooms wide on its main story. The house's ornamentation is inspired by the Queen Anne style and includes a smaller gable in front of the main front gable and a front porch supported by turned columns and adorned with spindle-work.

The house was added to the National Register of Historic Places on November 7, 1996.
