= Joab Mershon House =

Historic house in Illinois, United States

- U.S. National Register of Historic Places
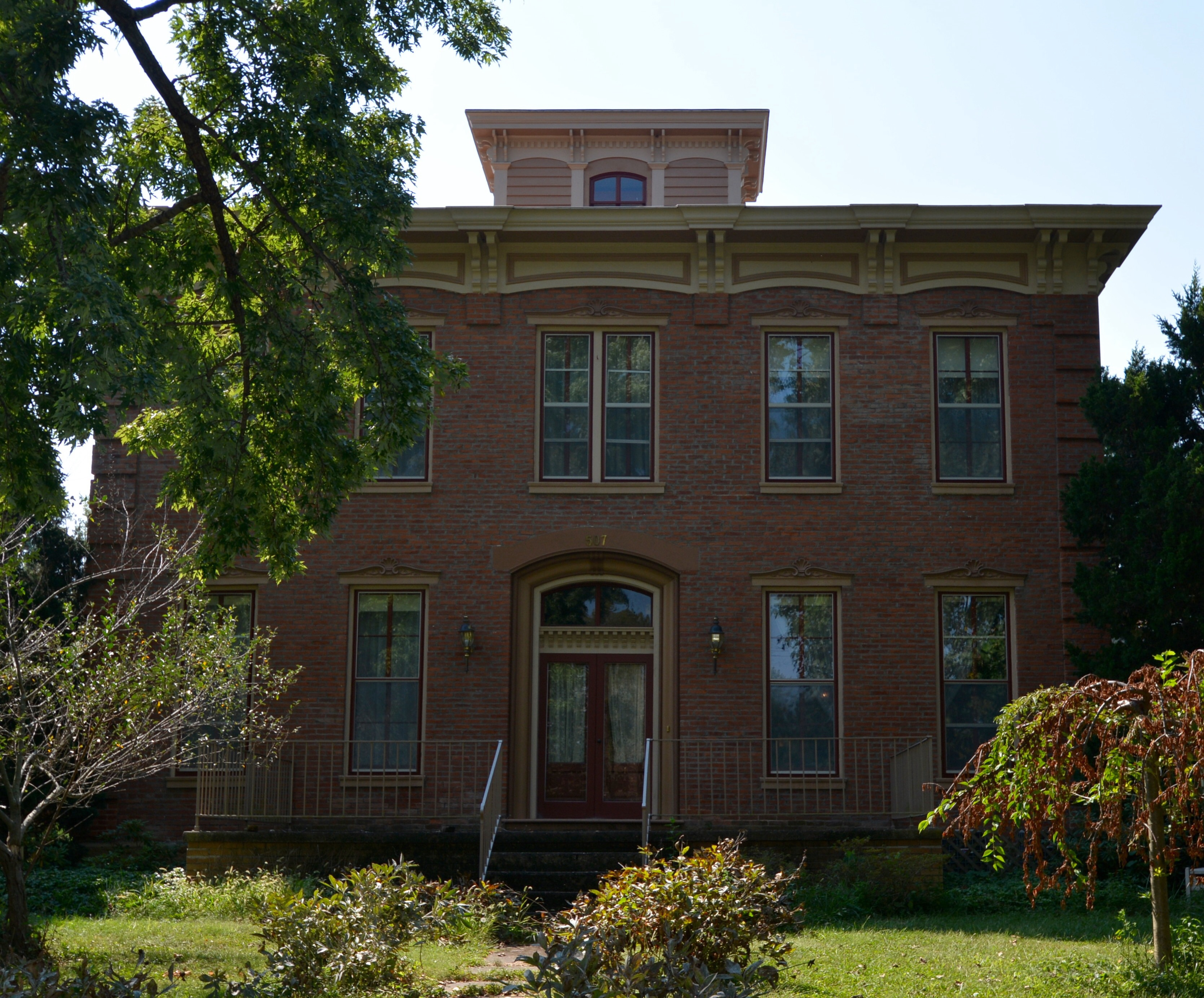

- Location within Illinois Location within the United States
- Location: 507 W. 5th St., Vermont, Illinois
- Coordinates: 40°17′36″N 90°25′59″W
- Area: less than one acre
- Built: 1859
- Architectural style: Greek Revival, Italianate, four-over-four
- MPS: Vermont, Illinois MPS
- NRHP reference No.: 96001294
- Added to NRHP: November 7, 1996

The Joab Mershon House is a historic house located at 507 West 5th Street in Vermont, Illinois. Joab Mershon, a local pork packer and banker, had the house built for his family in 1859. The house has an Italianate design with Greek Revival elements; at the time of its construction, the former style was emerging in popularity while the latter was declining, and the house represents a transitional work between the two styles. The Italianate influence is seen most prominently in the hip roof, which features a bracketed cornice and a cupola with matching brackets. Key Greek Revival elements include the dentillation on the entrance and cupola and the ornamental cast iron lintels. The house's interior has a four-over-four plan, which features four rooms on each floor and a central hallway.

The house was added to the National Register of Historic Places on November 7, 1996.
