= Edith Chipman House =

Historic house in Illinois, United States

- U.S. National Register of Historic Places
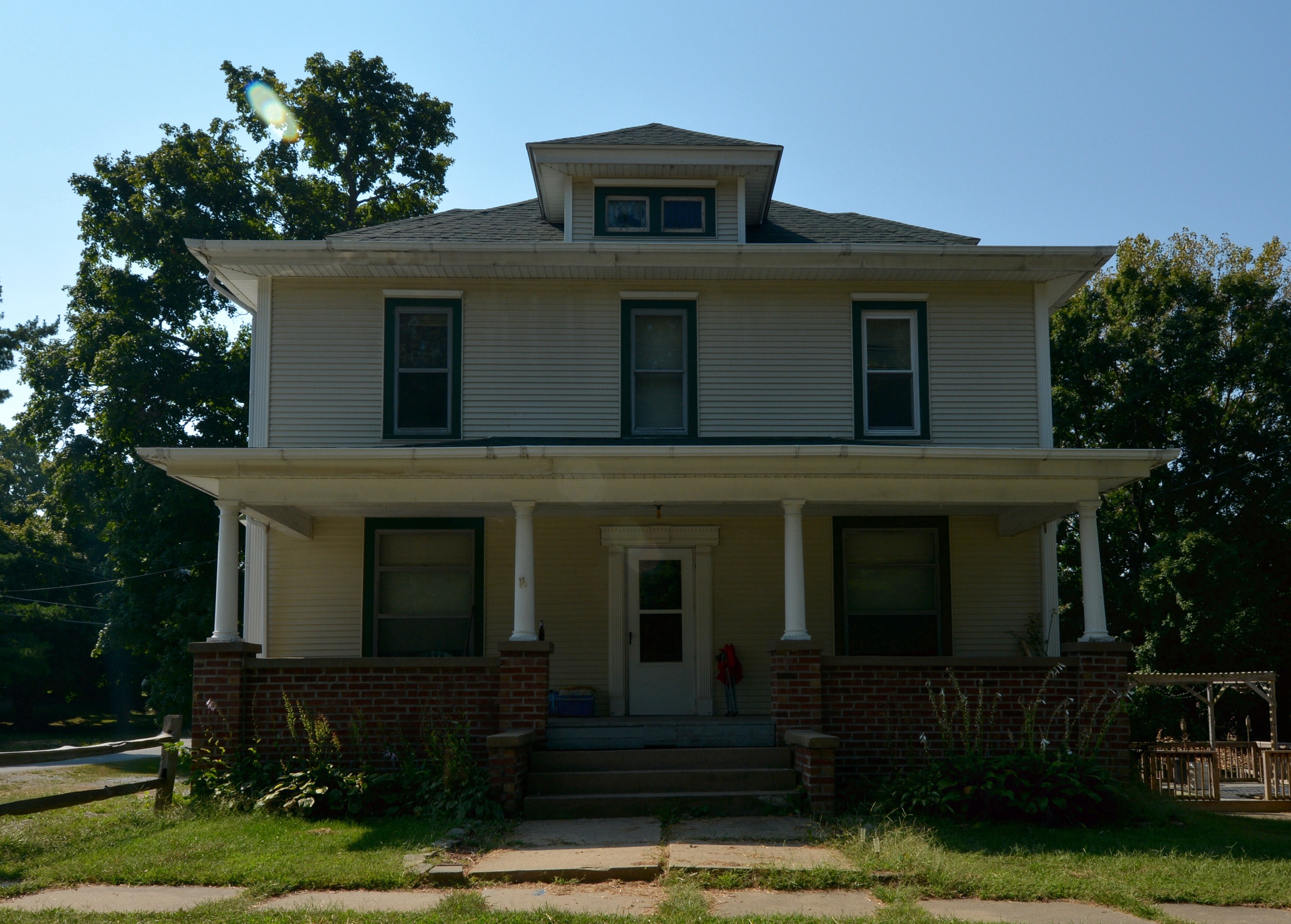

- Location within Illinois Location within the United States
- Location: 201 W. 3rd St., Vermont, Illinois
- Coordinates: 40°17′43″N 90°25′44″W
- Area: less than one acre
- Architectural style: Classical Revival, four-over-four
- MPS: Vermont, Illinois MPS
- NRHP reference No.: 96001290
- Added to NRHP: November 7, 1996

The Edith Chipman House is a historic house located at 201 West 3rd Street in Vermont, Illinois. Edith Chipman, the widow of a wealthy local farmer and lumber seller, had the house built in 1912. The house had a four-over-four plan, typified by four equally sized rooms and a central hallway on both of its two stories, with American Foursquare exterior features and Classical Revival details. The house's cubelike shape and its hip roof with hipped dormers are typical of American Foursquare homes, though the interior plan is not typical of Foursquare architecture. Its Classical Revival elements include the Tuscan columns supporting the porch, the entablatures on the inside of the doors and windows, and the staircase's balusters and newel posts.

The house was added to the National Register of Historic Places on November 7, 1996.
