= Hiram Palmer House =

Historic house in Illinois, United States

- U.S. National Register of Historic Places
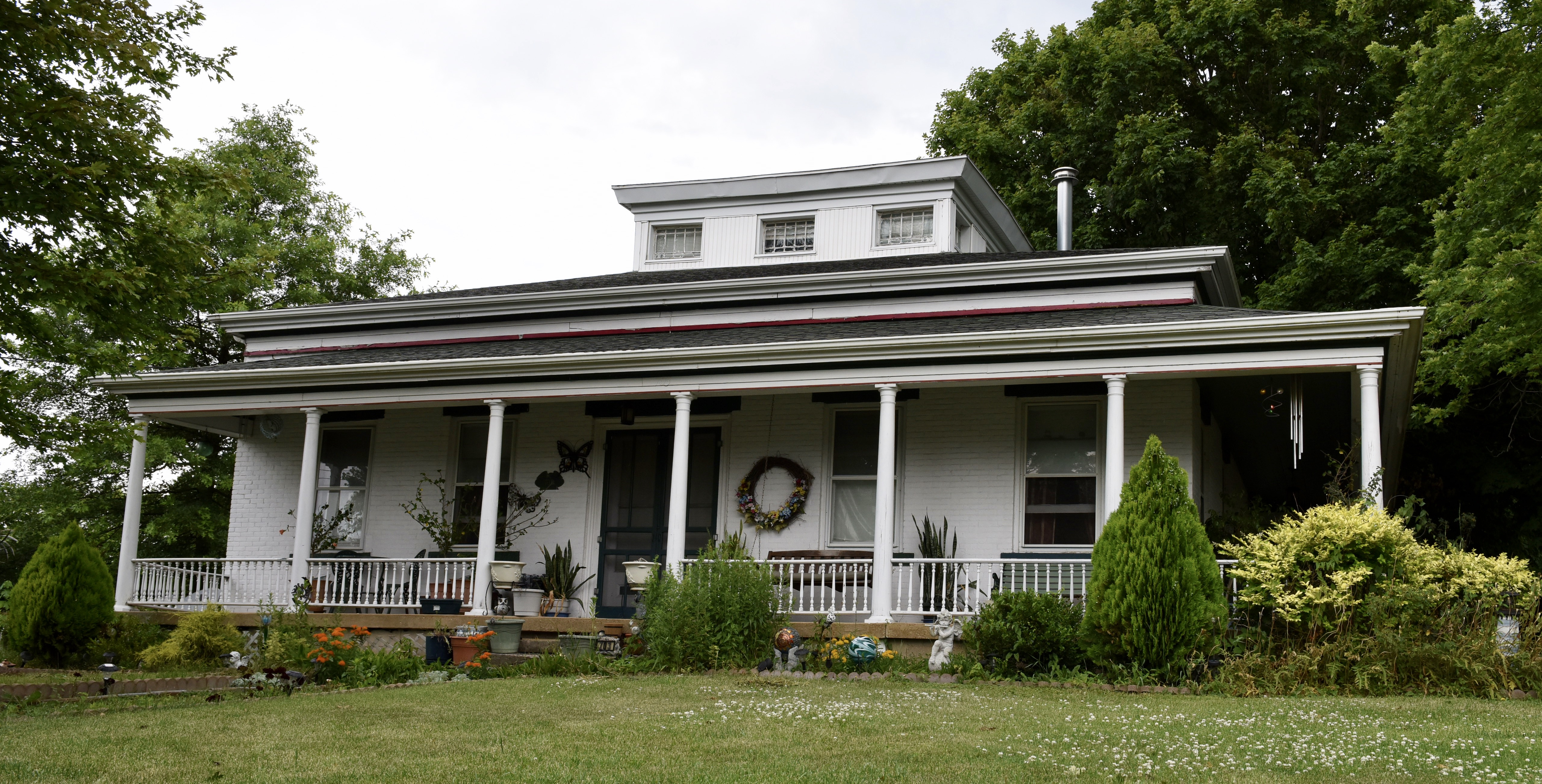

- Location within Illinois Location within the United States
- Location: 703 E. Fort St., Farmington, Illinois
- Coordinates: 40°41′53″N 89°59′38″W
- Area: less than one acre
- Built: 1851
- Architectural style: Greek Revival
- NRHP reference No.: 99000589
- Added to NRHP: May 20, 1999

The Hiram Palmer House is a historic house located at 703 East Fort Street in Farmington, Illinois. Hiram and Philynder Palmer built the house in 1851–52 but sold it the year it was completed. In 1856, the house was purchased by Riley Bristol, a local pharmacist and founder of Farmington's First Congregational Church; Bristol lived in the house until 1882. The house has a Greek Revival design, a nationally popular stylistic choice in the first half of the nineteenth century. The wraparound front porch is supported by Tuscan columns. The house's low hip roof features a plain frieze and cornice at the roof line and is topped by a lantern with a cornice and pediment. The house's interior features decorative Greek Revival woodwork, including carved door and window moldings, ornamental panels by the windows, and a fireplace mantel supported by pilasters.

The house was added to the National Register of Historic Places on May 20, 1999.
