= Ahaymer =

Ahaymer احيمر
- Village
- Location within Iran
- Coordinates: 31°35′00″N 48°07′57″E
- Country: Iran
- Province: Khuzestan
- County: Dasht-e Azadegan
- Bakhsh: Central
- Rural District: Howmeh-ye Gharbi

Population (2006)
  - Total: 132
- Time zone: UTC+3:30 (IRST)
  - Summer (DST): UTC+4:30 (IRDT)

Ahaymer (Persian: احيمر, also Romanized as Aḩaymer; also known as Ḩamer) is a village in Howmeh-ye Gharbi Rural District, in the Central District of Dasht-e Azadegan County, Khuzestan Province, Iran. At the 2006 census, its population was 132, in 21 families.
