= Carithers Store Building =

- Formerly listed on the U.S. National Register of Historic Places
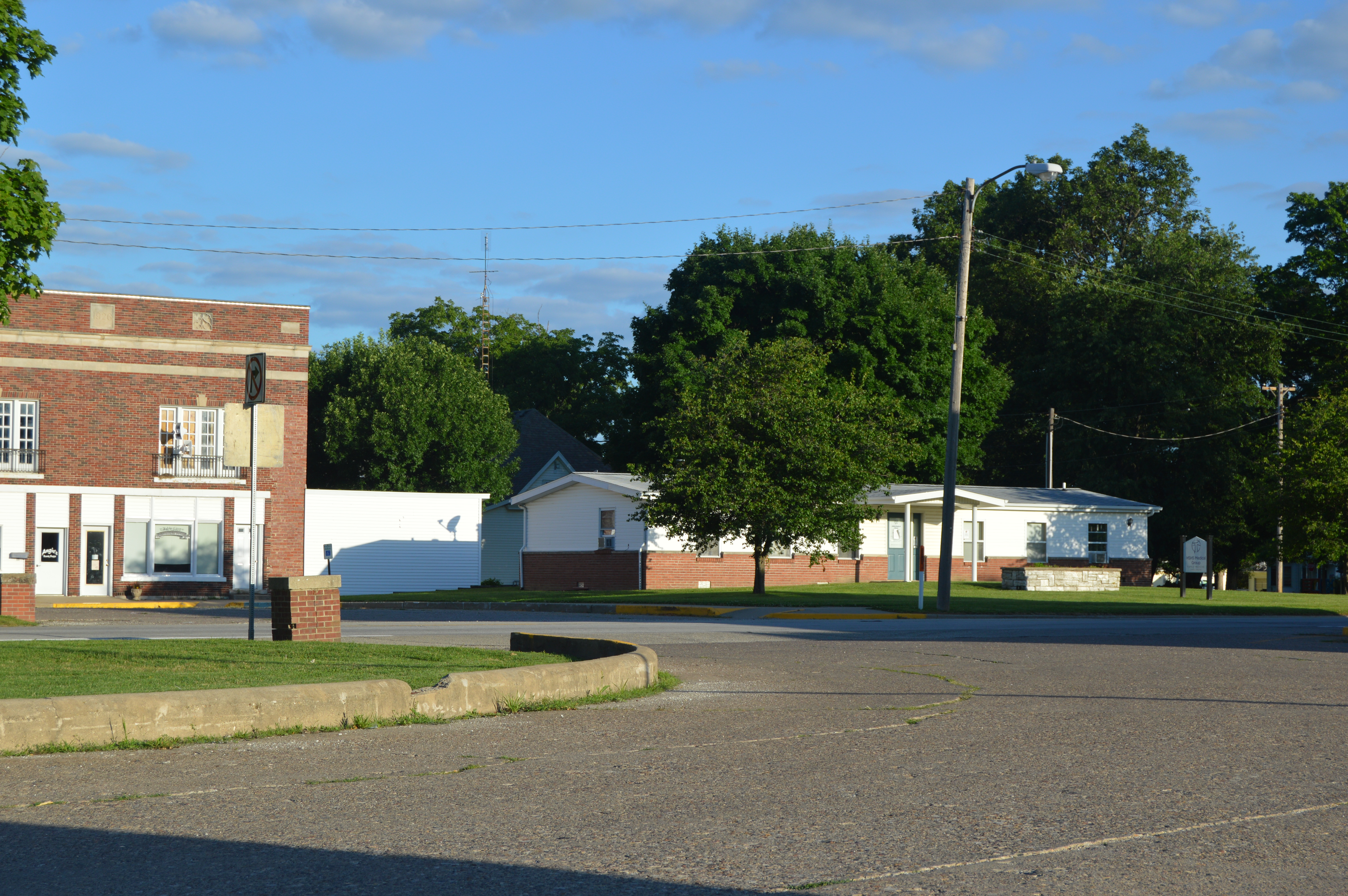
- Site of the building, the empty lot at right

- Location within Illinois Location within the United States
- Location: Table Grove Village Sq., W of US 136, Table Grove, Illinois
- Coordinates: 40°21′58″N 90°25′32″W
- Area: less than one acre
- Built: 1871
- Architectural style: Greek Revival, Italianate
- NRHP reference No.: 87001262

Significant dates
- Added to NRHP: August 3, 1987
- Removed from NRHP: January 6, 2020

The Carithers Store Building was a historic commercial building located adjacent to U.S. Route 136 on the northwest side of Village Square in Table Grove, Illinois. The two-story frame building was built in 1871; its design features Greek Revival and Italianate elements. It was added to the National Register of Historic Places in 1987 as the only surviving two-story frame commercial building in the Table Grove area. The building is no longer standing, and was removed from the National Register in 2020.

== History ==
The building was built in 1871 to serve as a mercantile store owned by the Carithers brothers, William and John H. The store was part of a wave of new commercial buildings erected in Table Grove during the 1870s. This period of business growth followed the introduction of Rockford, Rock Island, and St. Louis Railroad service to the village in 1870. The two-story building, which included office space and a canopy to show goods outdoors, signified that the Carithers brothers expected their store to be successful and long-lasting enough to support such a large building. The store was profitable into the 20th century, as evidenced by John's purchase of a large home in 1897 and the store's inclusion on the Plat of Table Grove in 1912. John's son Dwight B. Carithers and the brothers' nephew William L. Hipsley took over the store in 1898; Hipsley assumed full control after John's death in 1902, as Dwight took over the Carithers family farm in John's place. Hipsley managed the store until 1922, after which time the building was used as a rented storefront, a Sunday school, and a storage area.

== Architecture ==
The two-story wood frame store featured Greek Revival and Italianate elements in its design, reflecting a contemporary view that even functional buildings should have architectural ornaments. Broken pediments with dentillated eaves covered both gable ends of the building. Greek Revival-inspired pilasters marked three of the building's corners. The tall, narrow windows of the building had arched hoods, a typical Italianate feature.

At the time of the building's nomination to the National Register, it was the only surviving two-story frame commercial building within a 15-mile (24 km) radius of Table Grove. The building was consequently considered a significant local example of its type, as similar buildings had once existed in nearby communities but had been lost to demolition and decay. However, recent photographs of the site indicate that the building is no longer standing.
