= Vermont Masonic Hall =

- U.S. National Register of Historic Places
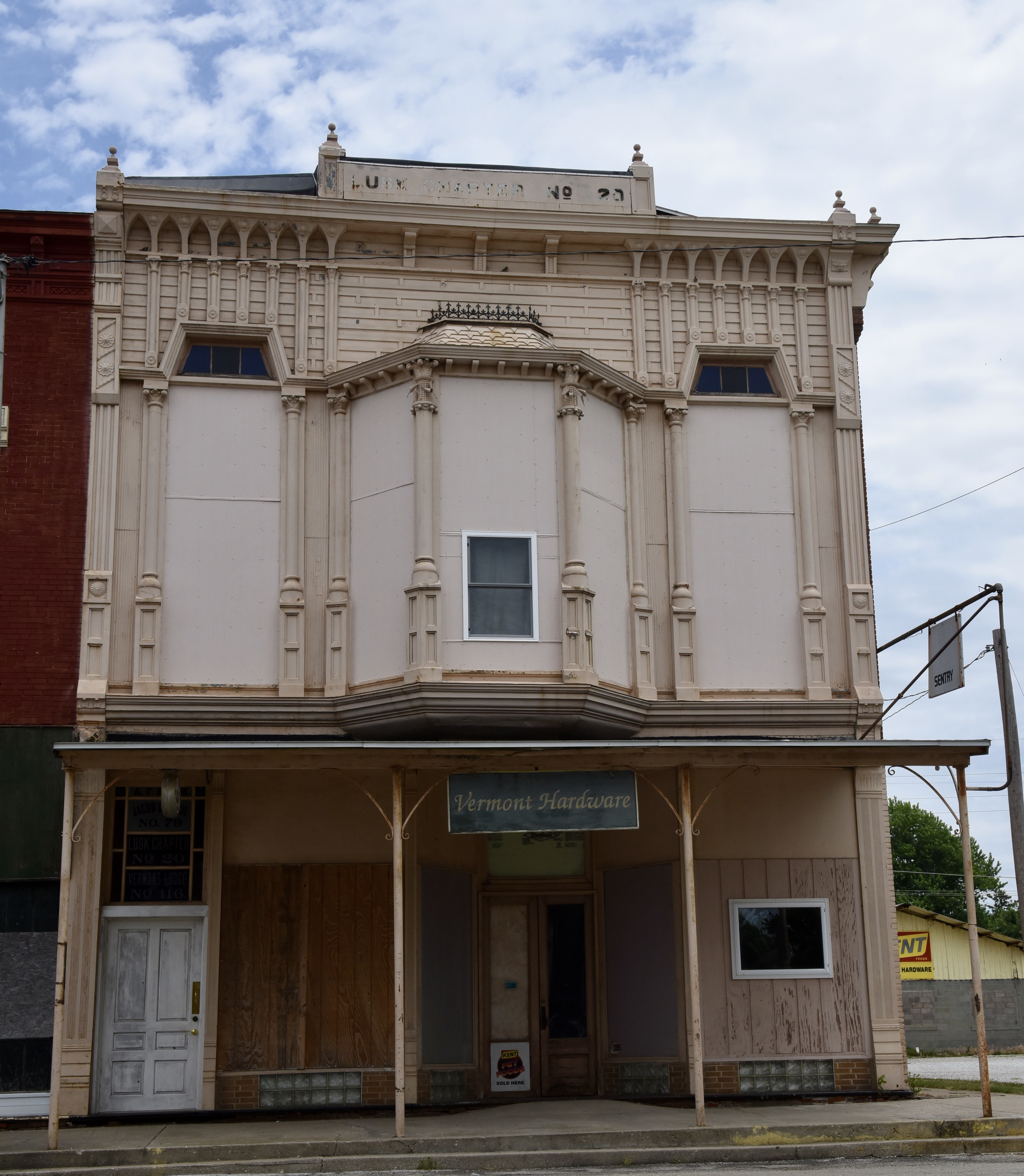

- Location within Illinois Location within the United States
- Location: N. Main St., Vermont, Illinois
- Coordinates: 40°17′42″N 90°25′39″W
- Area: less than one acre
- Built: 1891-92
- Architectural style: Chicago, Gothic, Commercial Style
- NRHP reference No.: 88002236
- Added to NRHP: November 16, 1988

The Vermont Masonic Hall, also known as the Vermont Hardware Store Building, is a historic Masonic Lodge located on North Main Street in Vermont, Illinois. The hall was built in 1891-92 for Vermont's Lodge No. 116 of Ancient, Free and Accepted Masons, which was formed in 1852. At the time the hall was built, secret societies were enjoying a wave of popularity in America, with the Masons preeminent among them; Vermont was no exception to this trend, and its Masons played an important role in the city's social life. The hall was a two-story commercial building; the Masons leased the second floor, while a hardware store operated on the first. The brick building features an elaborate iron storefront; its design, along with the lodge itself, led it to be considered of the best Masonic lodges in western Illinois.

The building was listed on the National Register of Historic Places on November 16, 1998.
