= Edward Hamer House =

Historic house in Illinois, United States

- U.S. National Register of Historic Places
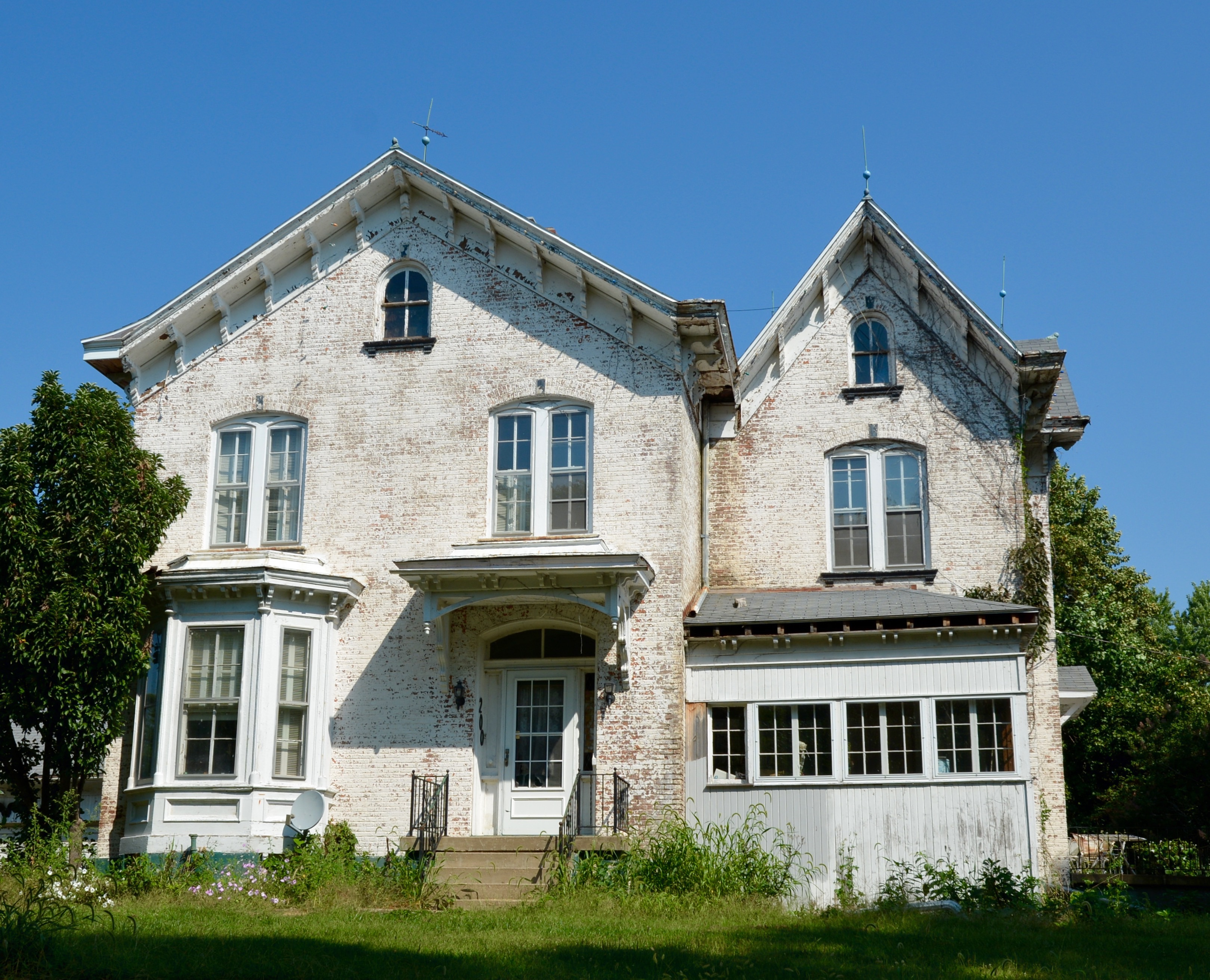

- Location within Illinois Location within the United States
- Location: 200 W. 2nd St., Vermont, Illinois
- Coordinates: 40°17′48″N 90°25′45″W
- Area: less than one acre
- Built: 1871
- Architectural style: Italianate
- MPS: Vermont, Illinois MPS
- NRHP reference No.: 96001293
- Added to NRHP: November 7, 1996

The Edward Hamer House is a historic house located at 200 West 2nd Street in Vermont, Illinois. Businessman Edward Hamer had the house built for himself and his wife in 1871. The house has an Italianate design and is one of two Italianate homes in Vermont with a front-facing gable. Both of the house's gables are steep and feature decorative brackets along the cornice. The front entrance is topped by a decorative hood with braces and paired brackets. A three-sided bay window with matching brackets projects from the first floor next to the entrance; the house's remaining windows are tall, narrow, and topped by segmental arches.

The house was added to the National Register of Historic Places on November 7, 1996.
