= Patterson Hamer House =

Historic house in Illinois, United States

- U.S. National Register of Historic Places
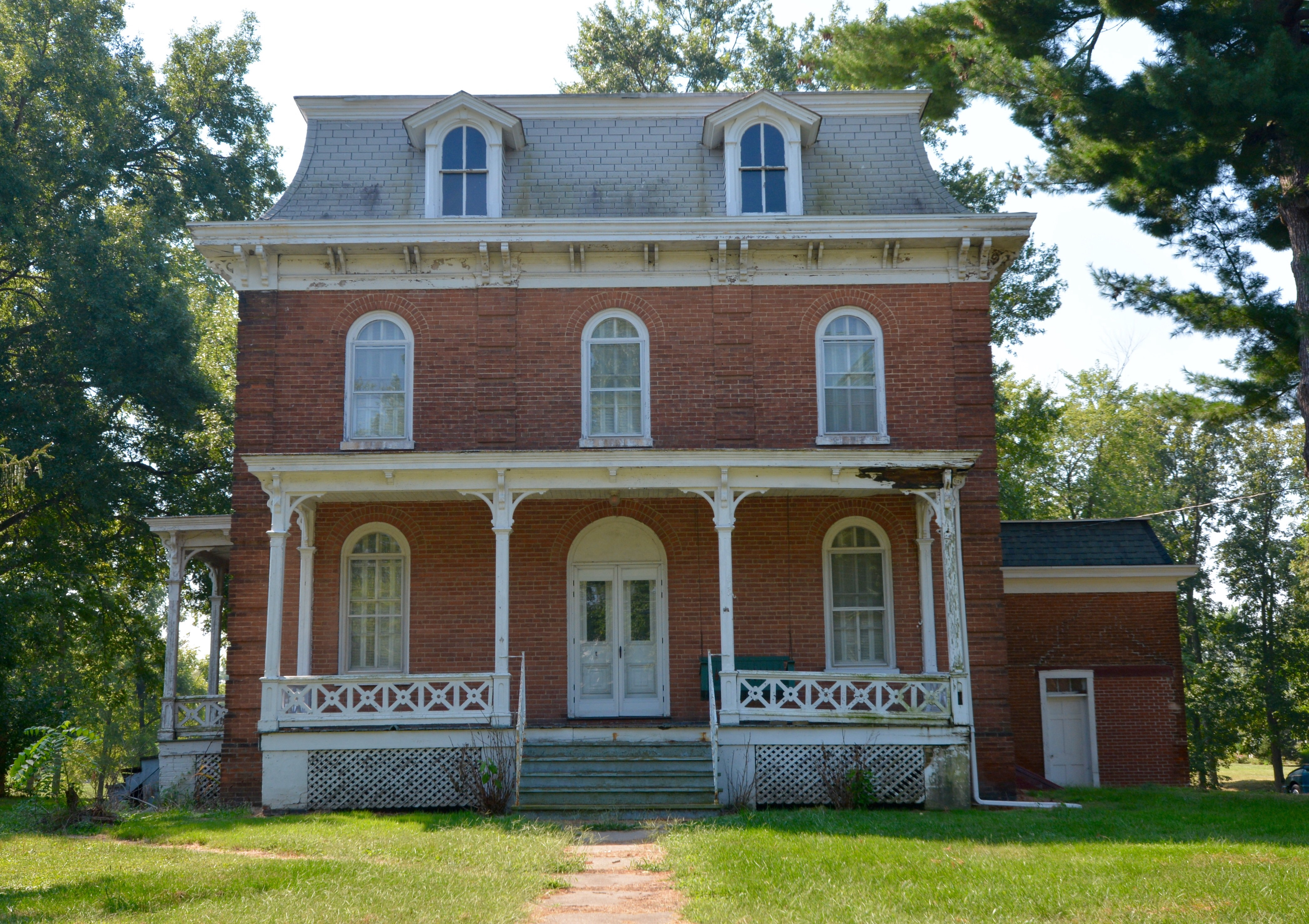

- Location within Illinois Location within the United States
- Location: 405 W. 5th St., Vermont, Illinois
- Coordinates: 40°17′36″N 90°25′52″W
- Area: less than one acre
- Built: 1872-73
- Architectural style: Second Empire
- MPS: Vermont, Illinois MPS
- NRHP reference No.: 96001287
- Added to NRHP: November 7, 1996

The Patterson Hamer House is a historic house located at 405 West 5th Street in Vermont, Illinois. Local businessman Patterson Hamer had the house built for his family in 1872–73. The house is designed in the Second Empire style, which was inspired by French architecture and popular in the United States from the 1860s through the 1880s. A mansard roof with two projecting dormers, a key feature of Second Empire designs, tops the house; the roof has cornices at the top and bottom and paired brackets along its eaves. The house also features three porches, all of them part of the original design, and arched windows. The property also includes a carriage house and a privy; both are designed to match the house, and the former has its own mansard roof.

The house was added to the National Register of Historic Places on November 7, 1996.
