= Col. Nathan Whitney House =

Historic house in Illinois, United States

- U.S. National Register of Historic Places
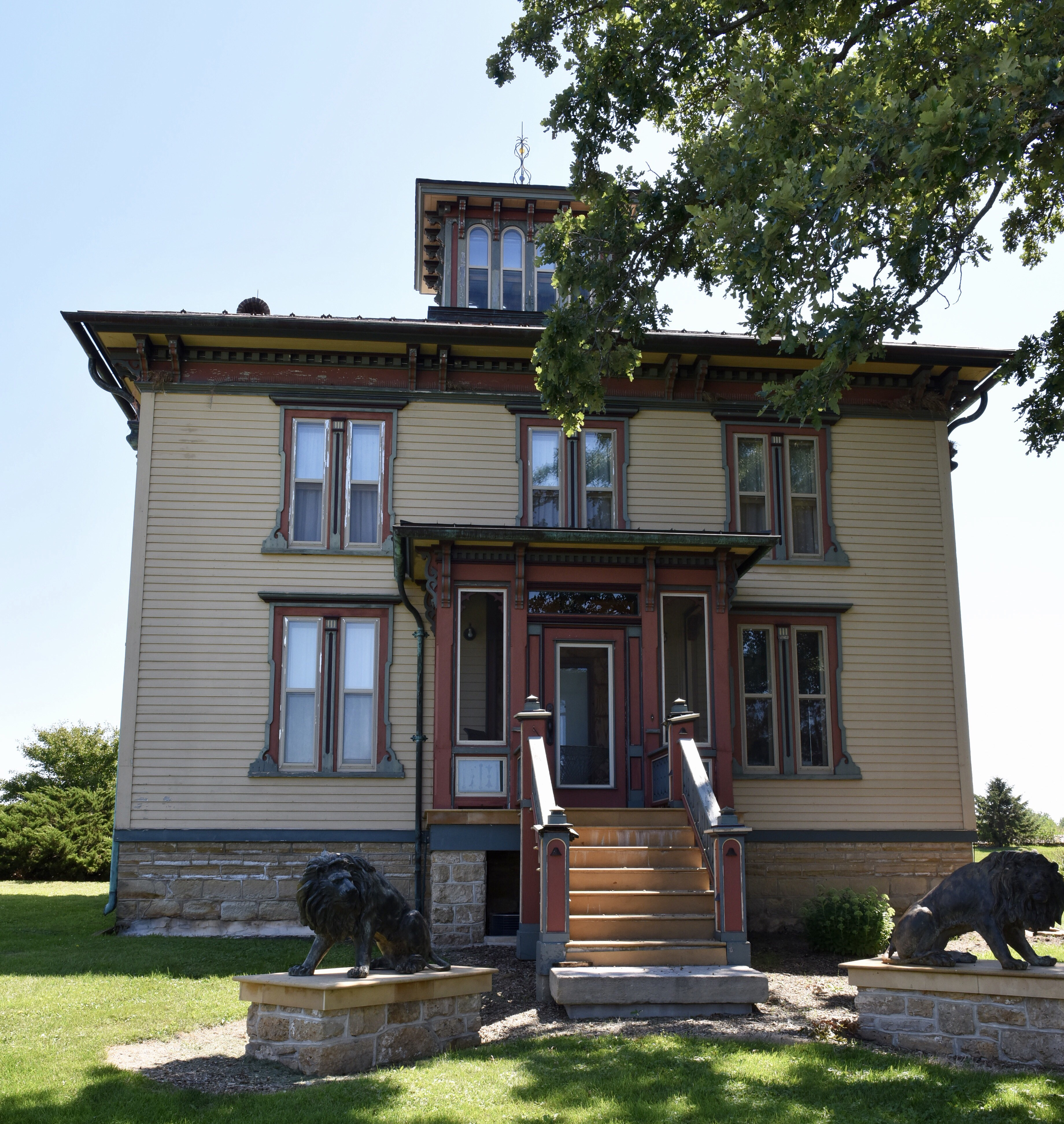

- Location within Illinois Location within the United States
- Nearest city: Franklin Grove, Illinois
- Coordinates: 41°49′6″N 89°17′37″W
- Area: less than one acre
- Built: 1860
- Architectural style: Italianate
- NRHP reference No.: 90001726
- Added to NRHP: November 2, 1990

The Col. Nathan Whitney House is a historic house located at 1620 Whitney Road south of Franklin Grove, Illinois, United States. The Italianate house was built for Colonel Nathan Whitney, a veteran of the War of 1812, in 1860. Whitney and his family settled in the Franklin Grove area in 1836 and founded the Franklin Grove Nursery and Orchards. The orchards became successful, and Whitney had four houses built for his family on the site, the 1860 house being the fourth.

The house's design features many of the typical features of Italianate architecture. A prominent cupola, a traditional feature of the style, tops the house's hipped roof. The house features decorative brackets and dentillation along its eaves and the top of its front porch; additional brackets separate the cupola's windows. The porch's railing and newel posts and the capitals of its columns also feature decorative moldings. The thin windows on both the house and its cupola emphasize the height of the building, as do the thin columns supporting the porch roof.

The house was added to the National Register of Historic Places on November 2, 1990.
