= Odd Fellows Opera Block =

- Ellisville Opera House
- U.S. National Register of Historic Places
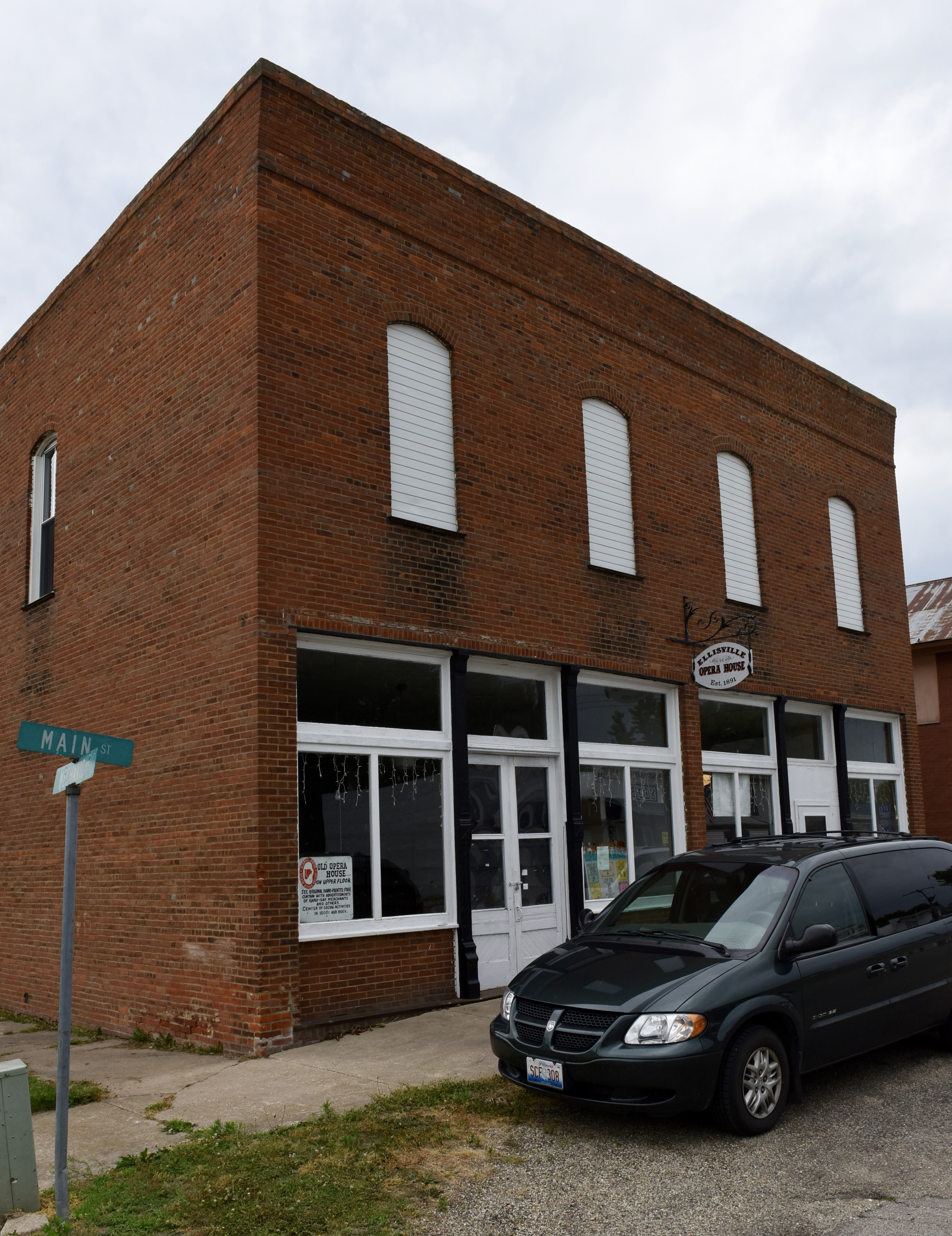

- Location within Illinois Location within the United States
- Location: Jct. of Main and Mechanic Sts., SW corner, Ellisville, Illinois
- Coordinates: 40°37′36″N 90°18′16″W
- Area: less than one acre
- Built: 1891
- Built by: Mercer, T. M.
- Architect: Parkins, W. H.
- NRHP reference No.: 96000876
- Added to NRHP: August 8, 1996

The Odd Fellows Opera Block is a historic theatre located at the southwestern corner of the intersection of Main and Mechanic Streets in Ellisville, Illinois. The Spoon River #78 Lodge of the Independent Order of Odd Fellows built the opera house in 1891. The opera house was one of many theatres built in small rural communities in the late 19th century as improved transportation and local wealth allowed these communities to have entertainment options previously reserved for larger cities. As Ellisville had well below 1000 residents and no railroad, most of the theatre's shows were locally produced, though it was occasionally able to attract regional touring companies. As the community's largest auditorium, the theatre also hosted other community events such as public meetings, benefit fairs and dances, and church services.

The opera house was added to the National Register of Historic Places on August 8, 1996.

== Sources ==
- https://www.cantondailyledger.com/news/20171006/jr-rascals-production-offers-whole-new-world
- https://www.cantondailyledger.com/news/20191004/junior-rascals-celebrate-friendship
- https://www.cantondailyledger.com/news/20190621/ellisville-production-strikes-up-band
- https://www.cantondailyledger.com/news/20180622/rascals-head-back-to-80s
- https://www.cantondailyledger.com/news/20170623/ellisville-production-celebrates-family-individuality
- https://www.cantondailyledger.com/news/20161228/celebrating-christmas-tradition
- http://cantondailyledger.com/news/20160930/rascals-offers-charm-entertainment
- https://www.reviewatlas.com/x293550893/Summer-entertainment-at-Ellisville-Opera-House
- http://www.cmi.ruraledu.org/place-based-forum/69-voices-of-spoon-river-the-ellisville-opera-house
