= Hamer Hall =

Hamer Hall may refer to:

== Australia ==
- Hamer Hall, Melbourne, concert hall within Melbourne's Arts Centre

== United States ==
- Hamer Hall (Hamer, South Carolina), listed on the National Register of Historic Places (NRHP)
- Hamer Hall (California University of Pennsylvania), an athletic facility and competition venue at California University of Pennsylvania

== See also ==
- Hamer House (disambiguation)
