= Stapleford–Hoover–Whitney House =

Historic house in Illinois, United States

- U.S. National Register of Historic Places
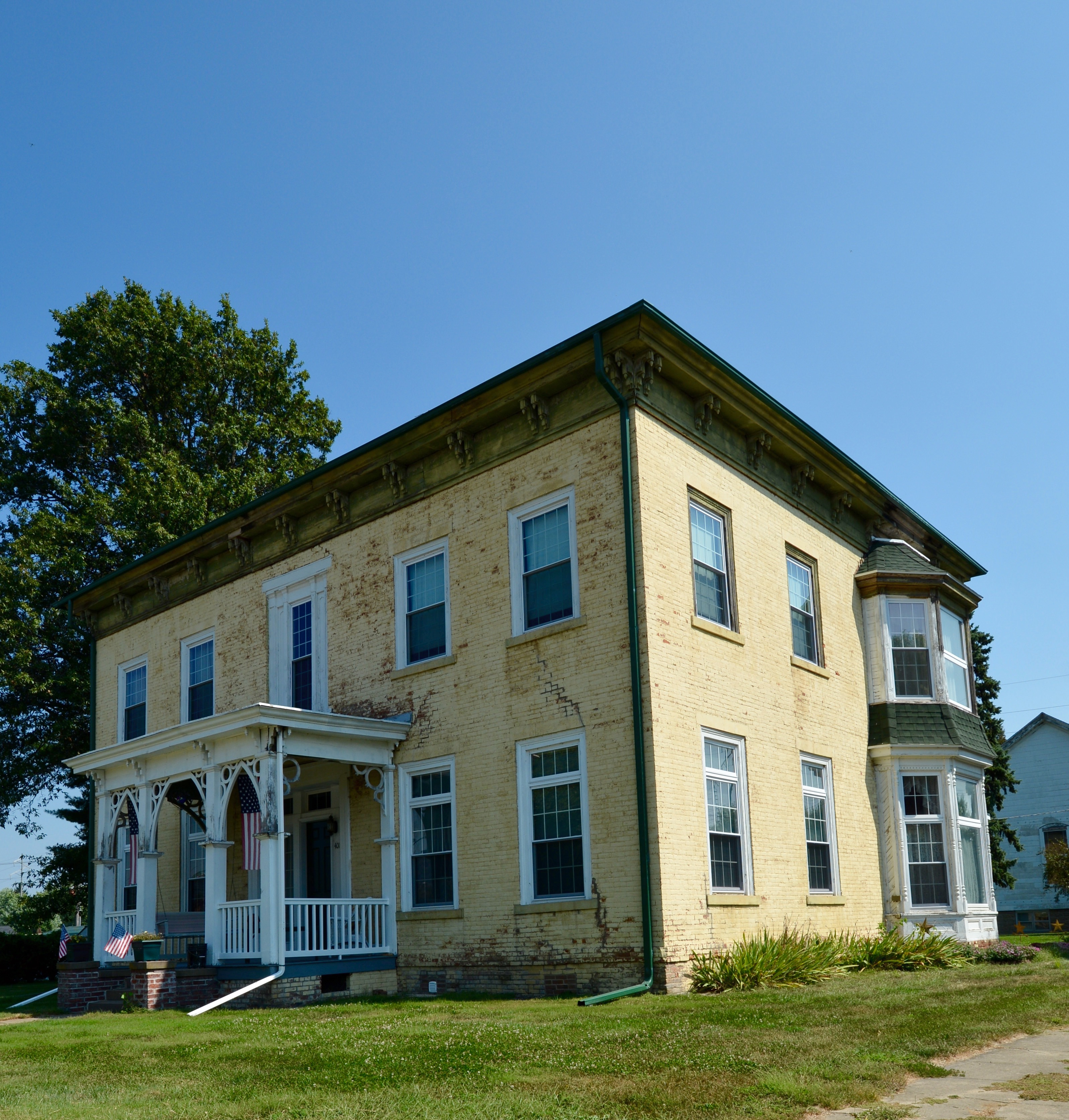

- Location within Illinois Location within the United States
- Location: 401 N. Main St., Vermont, Illinois
- Coordinates: 40°17′51″N 90°25′38″W
- Area: less than one acre
- Built: c. 1855
- Architectural style: Greek Revival, Italianate, Queen Anne
- MPS: Vermont, Illinois MPS
- NRHP reference No.: 96001291
- Added to NRHP: November 7, 1996

The Stapleford–Hoover–Whitney House is a historic house located at 401 North Main Street in Vermont, Illinois. Built circa 1855, the house was twice remodeled and incorporates elements of three different architectural styles. The original house was built for businessman and speculator Edward Stapleford; it had an I-house plan with a Greek Revival design, which is still reflected in its entrance and windows. Stapleford hanged himself in 1857 after going into debt via a speculation gone wrong; his wife Sarah lived in the house until 1871, when it was purchased by Dr. A. L. Hoover. Hoover, who ran a medical practice in the village, added the house's Italianate features, which included a hip roof with a bracketed cornice and two ornate porches. Merchant George F. Whitney bought the house in the 1880s; his wife and son added the Queen Anne style bay window in 1892.

The house was added to the National Register of Historic Places on November 7, 1996.
