= East Waterford School =

- U.S. National Register of Historic Places
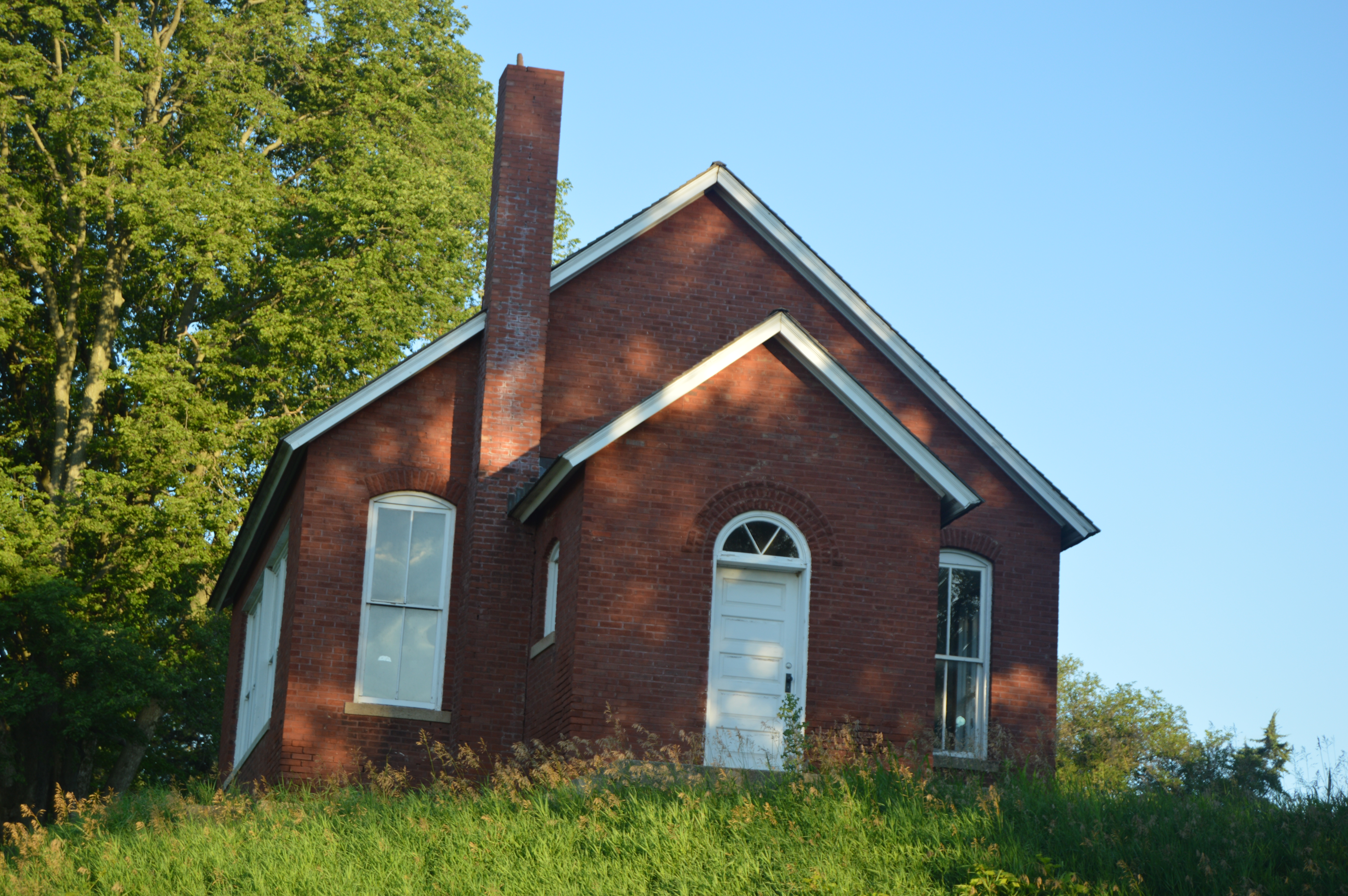

- Location within Illinois Location within the United States
- Location: Junction of North Dickson Mounds Rd. and East Prairie Rd., Lewistown, Illinois
- Coordinates: 40°20′59″N 90°6′55″W
- Area: 0.5 acres (0.20 ha)
- Built: 1907
- Built by: Lester, John (Jack); Hughes, Job
- Architectural style: One-room Schoolhouse
- NRHP reference No.: 09000897
- Added to NRHP: November 10, 2009

The East Waterford School is a historic one-room schoolhouse located at the junction of North Dickson Mounds Road and East Prairie Road in Waterford Township, Fulton County, Illinois. The school was built in 1907 to replace an 1856 building which had burned down earlier in the year. While it was still a traditional one-room rural school building, the new school added several modern features which made it relatively progressive for its time and setting. While it was still a frame building like its predecessor, the new school had a brick veneer, making it both more durable and visually appealing. The interior featured a heating plant in the basement with an indoor staircase and a cloakroom which was separate from the classroom, both of which were newer developments for small schools at the time.

The schoolhouse was added to the National Register of Historic Places on November 10, 2009.
