= Fiatt, Illinois =

- Unincorporated community
- Location within Illinois Location within the United States
- Coordinates: 40°33′37″N 90°10′47″W
- Country: United States
- State: Illinois
- County: Fulton
- Elevation: 676 ft (206 m)
- Time zone: UTC-6 (Central (CST))
  - Summer (DST): UTC-5 (CDT)
- ZIP Code: 61433
- Area code: 309
- GNIS feature ID: 408349

Fiatt is an unincorporated community in Fulton County, Illinois, United States. The community is on Illinois Routes 9 and 97 7.6 miles (12.2 km) west of Canton. Fiatt has a post office with ZIP Code 61433, which opened on July 17, 1843.

It is served by the Cuba Community Unit District 3 school system (K–12) and Spoon River College. The community lies within the Canton micropolitan statistical area. It is in Joshua Township.
