= Delbert and Ora Chipman House =

Historic house in Utah, United States

- U.S. National Register of Historic Places
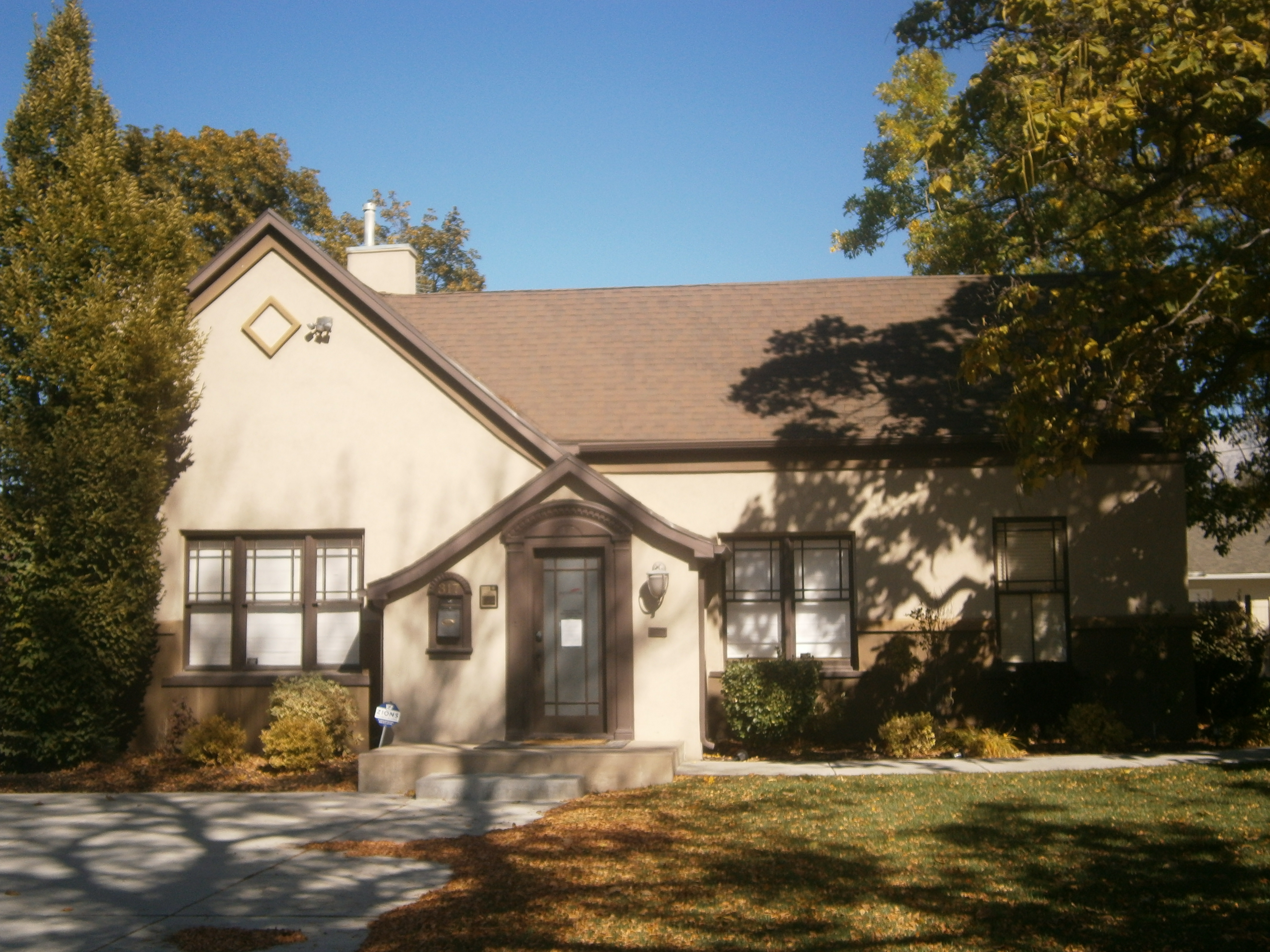

- Location within Utah Location within the United States
- Location: 317 E. Main St., American Fork, Utah
- Coordinates: 40°22′37.4″N 111°47′24.5″W
- Area: less than one acre
- Built: c.1870s; 1930 (renovated)
- Built by: Shelley, Joseph; Keller, Jared D.
- Architectural style: Tudor Revival
- NRHP reference No.: 94001563
- Added to NRHP: January 25, 1995

The Delbert and Ora Chipman House on E. Main St. in American Fork, Utah was built c.1870s but was extensively renovated and enlarged during approximately 1930–1934. The renovation and expansion added Tudor Revival or English Cottage architecture. It was listed on the National Register of Historic Places in 1995. The listing included two contributing buildings: the house and a c.1920s sheep barn which has a clerestory roof.

== See also ==
- Henry & Elizabeth Parker Chipman House, also in American Fork, also NRHP-listed
