= Henry & Elizabeth Parker Chipman House =

Historic house in Utah, United States

- U.S. National Register of Historic Places
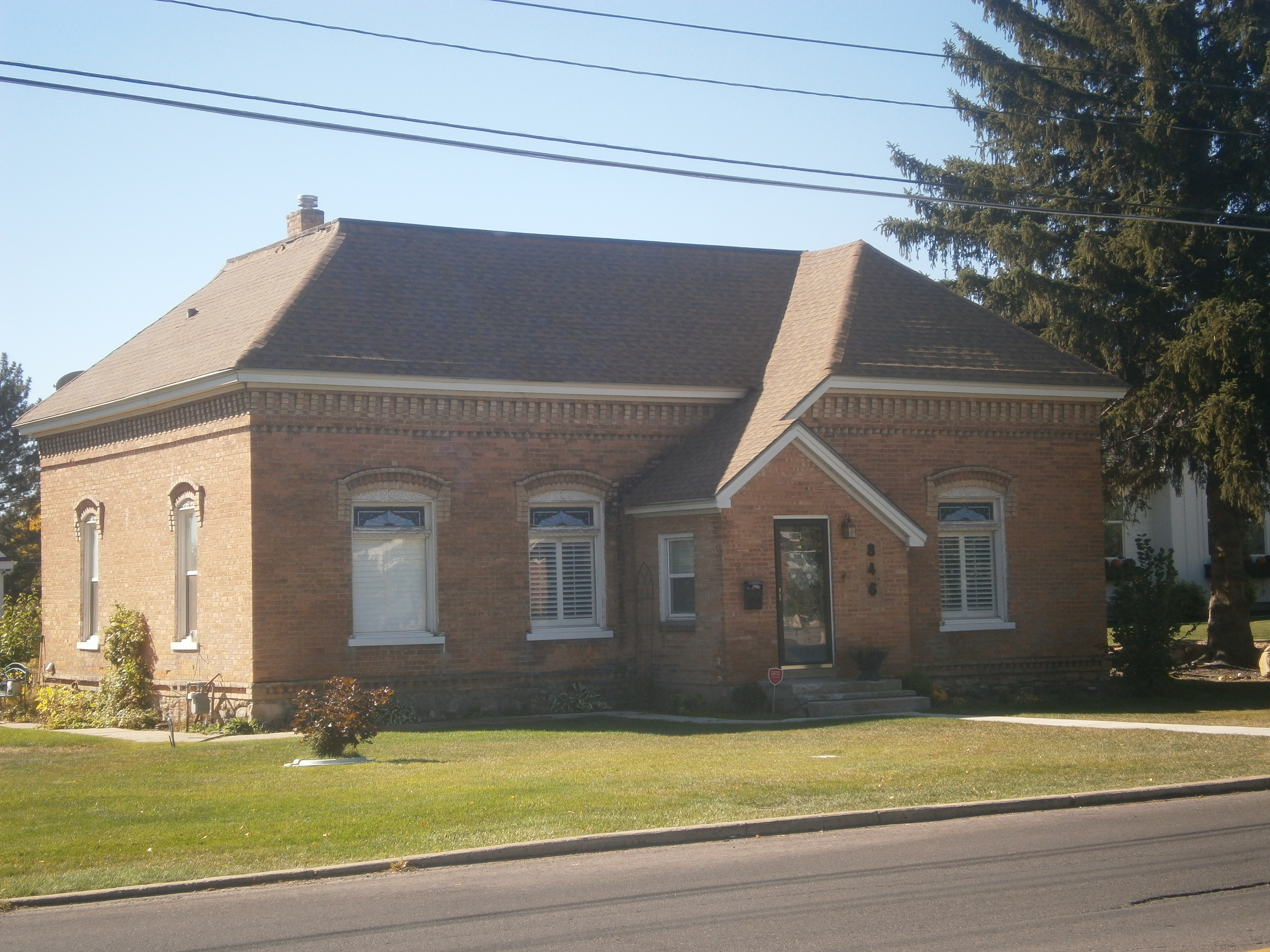

- Location within Utah Location within the United States
- Location: 846 E. 300 N., American Fork, Utah
- Coordinates: 40°22′58″N 111°46′33″W
- Area: less than one acre
- Built: 1897
- Built by: Smith, William B.
- Architectural style: Tudor Revival, Late Victorian, English Cottage
- NRHP reference No.: 09001293
- Added to NRHP: February 1, 2010

Henry & Elizabeth Parker Chipman House on E. 300 N. in American Fork, Utah was built in 1897. It has also been known as the James E. & Eliza C. Peters House. It was listed on the National Register of Historic Places in 2010. The listing included two contributing buildings.

It includes Tudor Revival, Late Victorian, and English Cottage architecture.

The Delbert and Ora Chipman House, also in American Fork, is also NRHP-listed.
