= South Fulton Churchhouse =

Historic church in Illinois, United States

- U.S. National Register of Historic Places
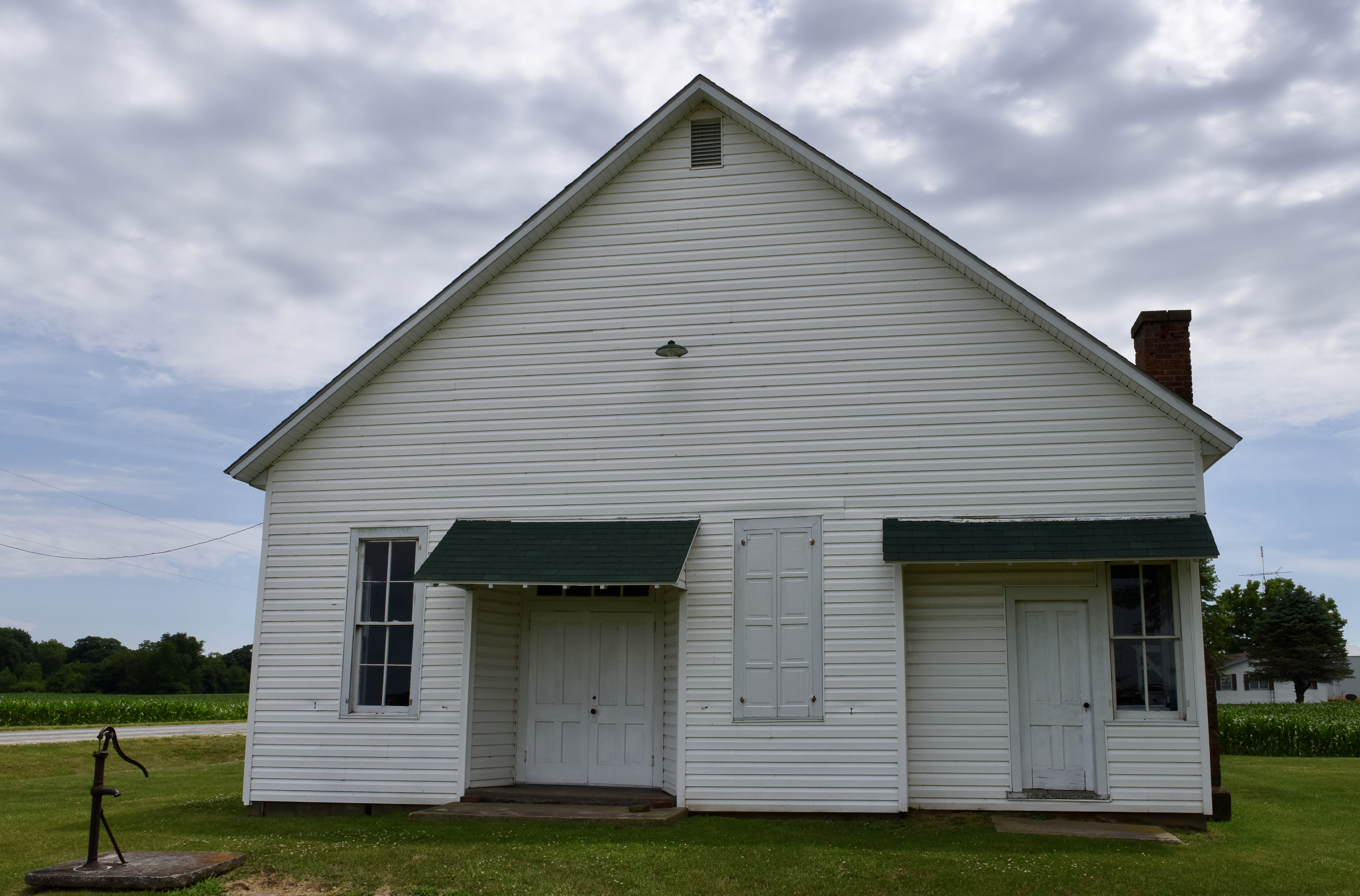

- Location within Illinois Location within the United States
- Location: Astoria, Fulton County, Illinois
- Coordinates: 40°11′45″N 90°21′26″W
- Area: 1.6 acres (0.65 ha)
- NRHP reference No.: 94001264
- Added to NRHP: October 28, 1994

The South Fulton Churchhouse is a historic church located on Baden Road roughly two miles south of Astoria, Fulton County, Illinois. The church was built in 1879 for the western body of Astoria's German Brethren congregation. The church had a frame vernacular design typical of rural Protestant churches built in the late 1800s; its cottage plan design, distinguished by its lack of a tower or ornamentation, was common among early German Brethren churches. Its congregation followed a particularly traditional branch of the German Brethren, and the services held there consisted of Scripture readings, commentary from a preacher, and prayer; the church resisted what it saw as modern developments such as church music and professional ministers. The church was also designed to host the communal love feast, a religious meal which formed an important part of the German Brethren faith; its basement includes a kitchen with a stone hearth.

The church was added to the National Register of Historic Places on October 28, 1994.
