= Vermont, Illinois =

- Village
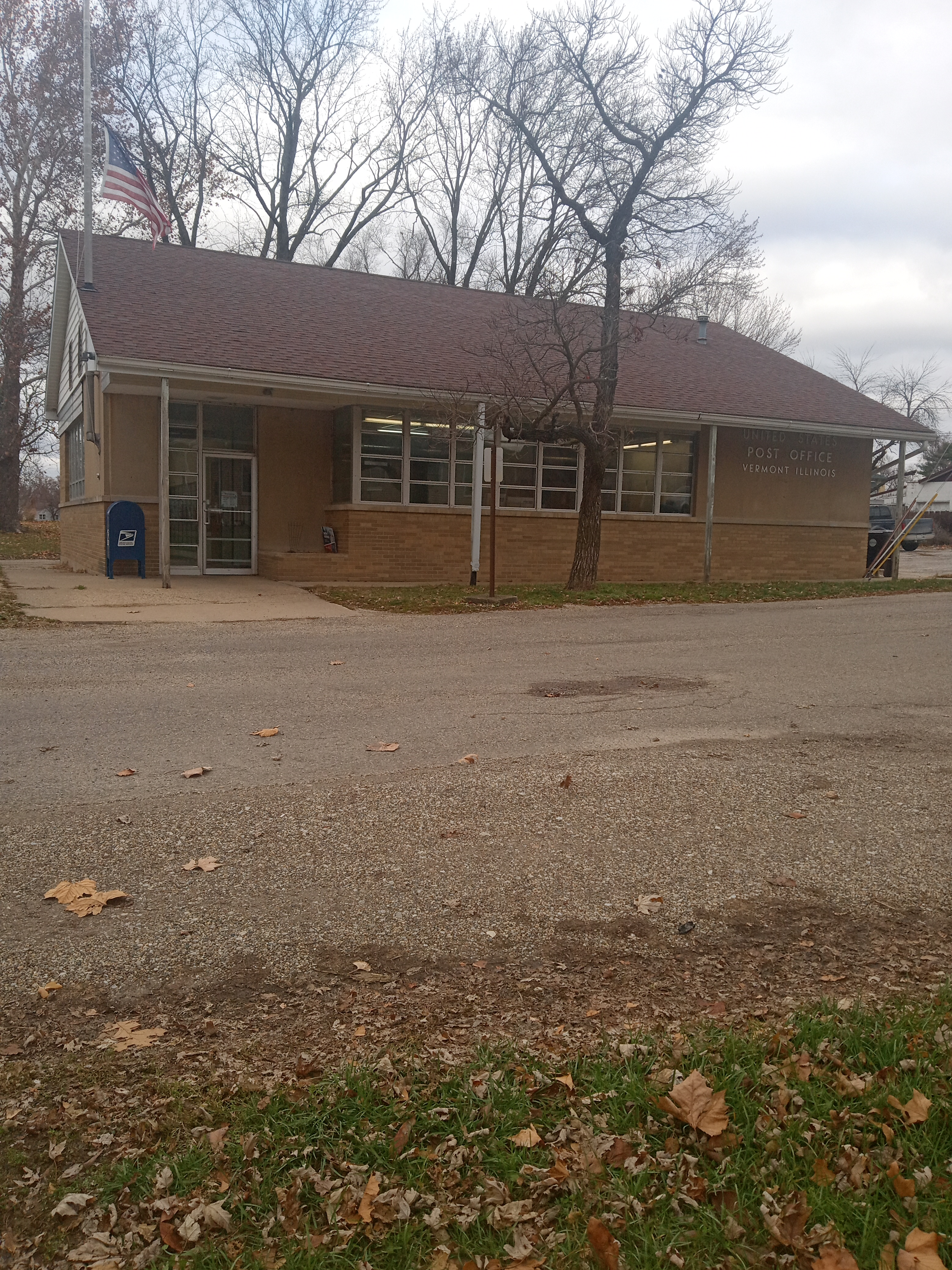
- Post office

- Location of Vermont in Fulton County, Illinois.

- Location of Illinois in the United States
- Coordinates: 40°17′45″N 90°25′44″W
- Country: United States
- State: Illinois
- County: Fulton
- Township: Vermont

Government
  - Village president: Ronnie Bair

Area
  - Total: 1.26 sq mi (3.26 km^{2})
  - Land: 1.26 sq mi (3.26 km^{2})
  - Water: 0 sq mi (0.00 km^{2})
- Elevation: 689 ft (210 m)

Population (2020)
  - Total: 570
- Time zone: UTC-6 (CST)
  - Summer (DST): UTC-5 (CDT)
- ZIP Code(s): 61484
- Area code: 309
- FIPS code: 17-77642
- GNIS ID: 2400059
- Wikimedia Commons: Vermont, Illinois
- Website: villageofvermont.com

Vermont is a village in Fulton County, Illinois, United States. The population was 570 at the 2020 census.

== History ==
The village was founded in 1835 by James and Joseph Crail. According to local tradition, it was named after the state of Vermont by Abitha Williams, to whom the Crail brothers had traded the naming rights in exchange for a gallon of whiskey. A post office was established in 1837, and the village was incorporated in 1857.

== Geography ==
Vermont is located in southwestern Fulton County, 5 miles (8 km) south of Table Grove and 21 miles (34 km) southwest of Lewistown, the county seat.

According to the 2021 census gazetteer files, Vermont has a total area of 1.26 square miles (3.26 km^{2}), all land.

== Demographics ==
Historical population
| Census | Pop. | Note | %± |
|---|---|---|---|
| 1880 | 1,133 | | — |
| 1890 | 1,158 | | 2.2% |
| 1900 | 1,195 | | 3.2% |
| 1910 | 1,118 | | −6.4% |
| 1920 | 1,078 | | −3.6% |
| 1930 | 948 | | −12.1% |
| 1940 | 945 | | −0.3% |
| 1950 | 940 | | −0.5% |
| 1960 | 903 | | −3.9% |
| 1970 | 947 | | 4.9% |
| 1980 | 885 | | −6.5% |
| 1990 | 806 | | −8.9% |
| 2000 | 792 | | −1.7% |
| 2010 | 667 | | −15.8% |
| 2020 | 570 | | −14.5% |
U.S. Decennial Census

As of the 2020 census there were 570 people, 332 households, and 231 families residing in the village. The population density was 453.10 inhabitants per square mile (174.94/km^{2}). There were 292 housing units at an average density of 232.11 per square mile (89.62/km^{2}). The racial makeup of the village was 96.32% White, 0.00% African American, 0.00% Native American, 0.00% Asian, 0.00% Pacific Islander, 0.70% from other races, and 2.98% from two or more races. Hispanic or Latino of any race were 2.81% of the population.

There were 332 households, out of which 25.9% had children under the age of 18 living with them, 56.63% were married couples living together, 10.84% had a female householder with no husband present, and 30.42% were non-families. 25.30% of all households were made up of individuals, and 9.64% had someone living alone who was 65 years of age or older. The average household size was 2.63 and the average family size was 2.22.

The village's age distribution consisted of 19.9% under the age of 18, 6.5% from 18 to 24, 19.7% from 25 to 44, 31.8% from 45 to 64, and 22.2% who were 65 years of age or older. The median age was 49.7 years. For every 100 females, there were 111.5 males. For every 100 females age 18 and over, there were 106.6 males.

The median income for a household in the village was $42,083, and the median income for a family was $53,047. Males had a median income of $31,786 versus $26,957 for females. The per capita income for the village was $23,135. About 9.5% of families and 11.0% of the population were below the poverty line, including 15.0% of those under age 18 and 6.1% of those age 65 or over.

== Arts and culture ==
A commemorative plaque in the town square is dedicated to Abraham Lincoln, who visited the town in 1858.

== Notable people ==
- John Clayton Allen, congressman
- Thomas Ray Hamer, congressman from Idaho
- John Calhoun Phillips, governor of Arizona from 1929 to 1931
- Seth Weeks, classical mandolinist
