= Metal Highway Bridges of Fulton County Thematic Resources =

Multiple listing in the U.S. National Register of Historic Places

- Metal Highway Bridges of Fulton County TR
- U.S. National Register of Historic Places
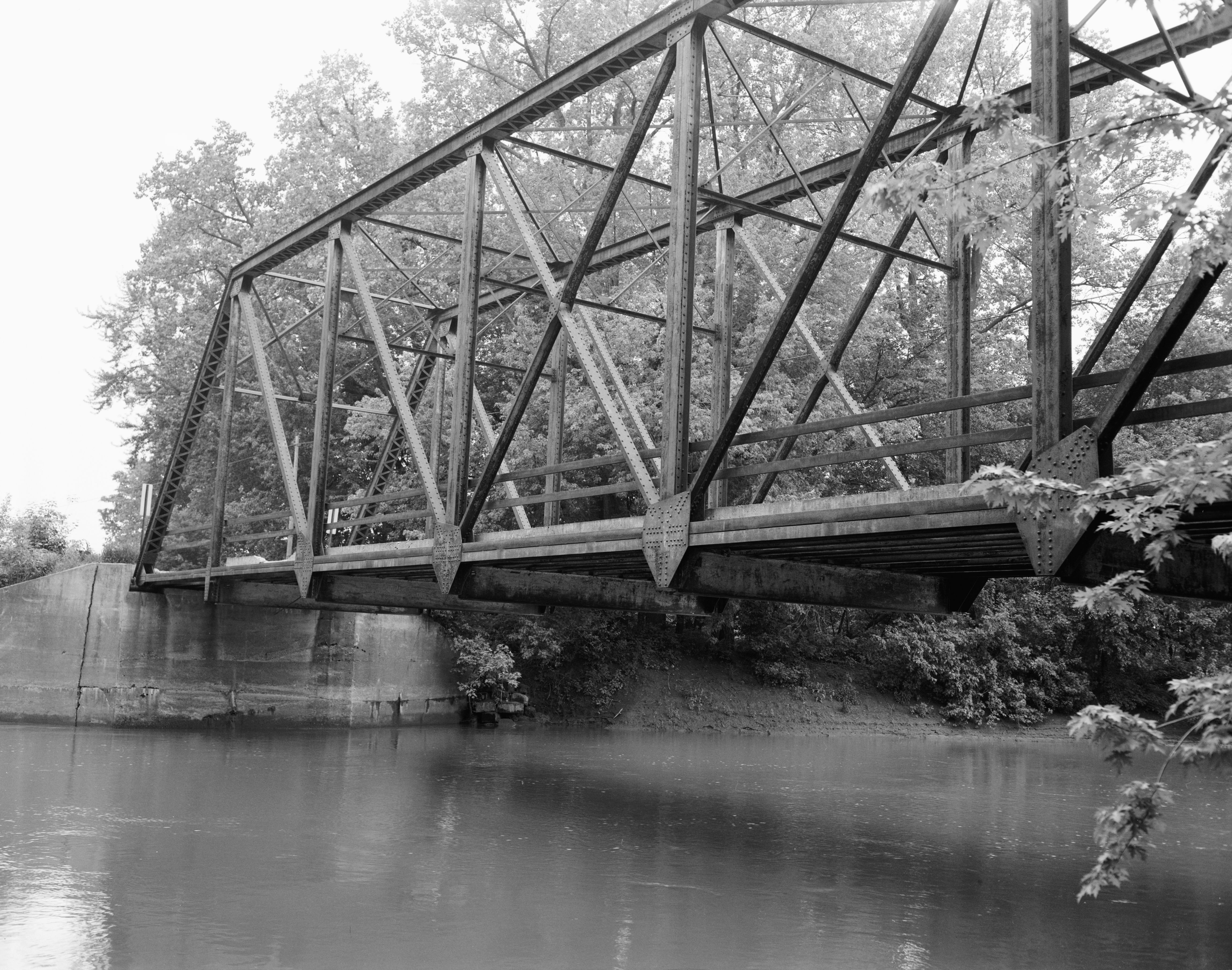
- The Indian Ford Bridge, one of five demolished Metal Highway Bridges of Fulton County
- Location: Fulton County, Illinois, United States
- Nearest city: Ellisville, Lewistown, London Mills, Seville, Smithfield
- Coordinates: 40°28′23″N 90°17′34″W
- Built: c. 1880-1915
- Architect: Various
- MPS: MPL011 - Metal Highway Bridges of Fulton County Thematic Resources
- NRHP reference No.: 80001355 - 80001363
- Added to NRHP: October 29, 1980

The Metal Highway Bridges of Fulton County Thematic Resources is the title for a Multiple Property Submission to the National Register of Historic Places in the U.S. state of Illinois. Originally the submission included nine separate bridges throughout Fulton County; however, since the Metal Highway Bridges' inclusion on the Register in 1980, more than half of those bridges have been destroyed.

== Bridges ==
The nine bridges are all located in rural settings. Away from cities and towns, the bridges were all located along dirt roads, though they were still all accessible by automobile save one. Even so, they were really only accessible in dry weather as rain renders many Illinois dirt roads impassable for the average car.

The original submission consisted of nine steel truss highway bridges in Fulton County, of nearly identical construction, spanning the Spoon River. They were located in or near various communities, and were collectively admitted to the National Register of Historic Places on October 29, 1980.

The nine bridges included with the original listing are: Seville Bridge, Bernadotte Bridge, Buckeye Bridge, London Mills Bridge, Babylon Bend Bridge, Elrod Bridge, Duncan Mills Bridge, Tartar's Ferry Bridge and Indian Ford Bridge. Of the nine, five have been destroyed since the listing on the Register in 1980. Four of the bridges – Tartar's Ferry, Bernadotte, Buckeye and Elrod – were located near Smithfield, Illinois. Of those four, only the Bernadotte Bridge remains. The Indian Ford Bridge and London Mills bridge were both located around London Mills, Illinois; neither still stands. The other three bridges – Babylon Bend, Seville, and Duncan Mills – were located near Ellisville, Seville and Lewistown, Illinois. Of those, only the Duncan Mills Bridge has been demolished.

== History ==
The location of Fulton County in Illinois

The nine bridges that make up the Metal Highway Bridges of Fulton County were all constructed between c. 1880 and c. 1915. All nine bridges were and are located on county and township roads in rural settings, and are all very similar in their construction materials and methods. They are early examples of steel truss bridges in Illinois.

=== Construction ===
The bridges in Fulton County exhibit two types of steel truss bridge construction, Pratt bridge and Parker, which were the most common early types of steel truss bridges. Due to variation within each type of bridge, the collection in Fulton County offered a unique opportunity to view the evolution of late 19th and early 20th century steel truss bridge construction. For example, the now-demolished London Mills Bridge, a Pratt built in 1883, featured pinned connection and double eyebars for the lower chord and for the diagonals. This is compared to the also destroyed Indian Ford Bridge, a Pratt bridge built in 1917, which used riveted connections and I-beam construction for its lower chords and diagonals.

Each of the bridges utilized similar construction materials; each one is/was almost all steel, with the possible exception of the London Mills Bridge and the Seville Bridge. Those two bridges—only the Seville still stands—are mostly steel but may include some iron construction due to their age. The bottom chords of the bridges range from 140 feet (43 m) to 200 feet (61 m) and the width averages 16 feet (4.9 m). In their massing, each bridge displays the lightness characteristic to metal bridges of the time period, although the later bridges began to exhibit characteristics more associated with modern steel truss bridges.

=== Destruction ===
The Elrod Bridge was completely destroyed by an F-4 tornado that moved through Fulton county during a 1995 tornado outbreak.

=== Significance ===
Together, the nine steel truss bridges stood out because of their proximity to each other within Fulton County. Indeed, they also held historical significance for their age and as examples of early steel truss bridge construction; but it is rare to find such a concentrated collection of so clearly related sites. When they were nominated for the National Register of Historic Places in 1980, before some were destroyed, they were the subject of local tours by canoe and road.
