= Seville Bridge =

- U.S. National Register of Historic Places
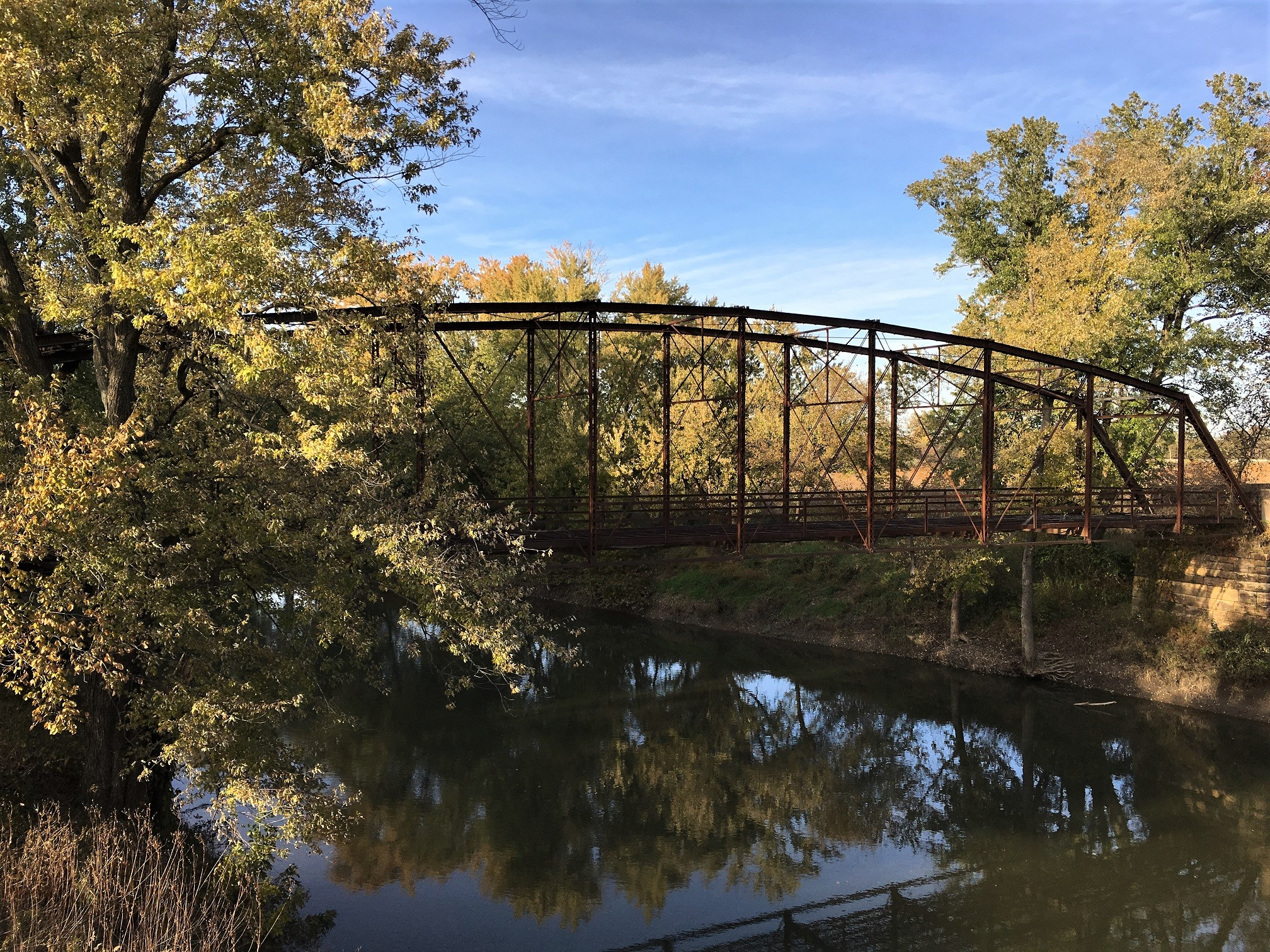

- Location within Illinois Location within the United States
- Location: Spans Spoon River in Seville, Seville, Illinois
- Coordinates: 40°29′9.4″N 90°20′35.2″W
- Area: less than one acre
- Built: c. 1880
- Architectural style: Parker truss
- MPS: MPL011 - Metal Highway Bridges of Fulton County Thematic Resources
- NRHP reference No.: 80001359
- Added to NRHP: October 29, 1980

The Seville Bridge is one of nine metal highway bridges in Fulton County, Illinois that were listed on the National Register of Historic Places. This particular one is located across the Spoon River in Seville. It was added to the National Register of Historic Places on October 29, 1980, along with the eight other bridges, as one of the "Metal Highway Bridges of Fulton County. Some of the other bridges include the Buckeye Bridge, Tartar's Ferry Bridge and the Bernadotte Bridge, all in Smithfield. Five of the nine bridges have been demolished, though Seville Bridge still stands.
