= Elrod Bridge =

- Formerly listed on the U.S. National Register of Historic Places
- Location within Illinois Location within the United States
- Nearest city: Smithfield, Illinois
- Coordinates: 40°23′29″N 90°15′16″W
- Built: 1890
- MPS: Metal Highway Bridges of Fulton County Thematic Resources
- NRHP reference No.: 80001362

Significant dates
- Added to NRHP: October 29, 1980
- Removed from NRHP: December 8, 1995

Elrod Bridge was one of nine metal highway bridges in Fulton County, Illinois once listed on the National Register of Historic Places. It was listed from 1980 until 1995.

Elrod was one of the six bridges that have been demolished out of nine similar bridges in the county. This particular one was over the Spoon River near Smithfield, Illinois, on Township Road 248 in Bernadotte Township. It was added to the National Register of Historic Places on October 29, 1980, along with the eight other bridges, as one of the "Metal Highway Bridges of Fulton County". The bridge was one of four near Smithfield listed on the Register, the others are the Buckeye Bridge, the Bernadotte Bridge and the Tartar's Ferry Bridge. Others, such as the Babylon Bend Bridge in Ellisville, are located throughout the county.

The Elrod Bridge was removed from the Register in 1995 after its destruction by an F-4 tornado.
