= Indian Ford Bridge =

- U.S. National Register of Historic Places
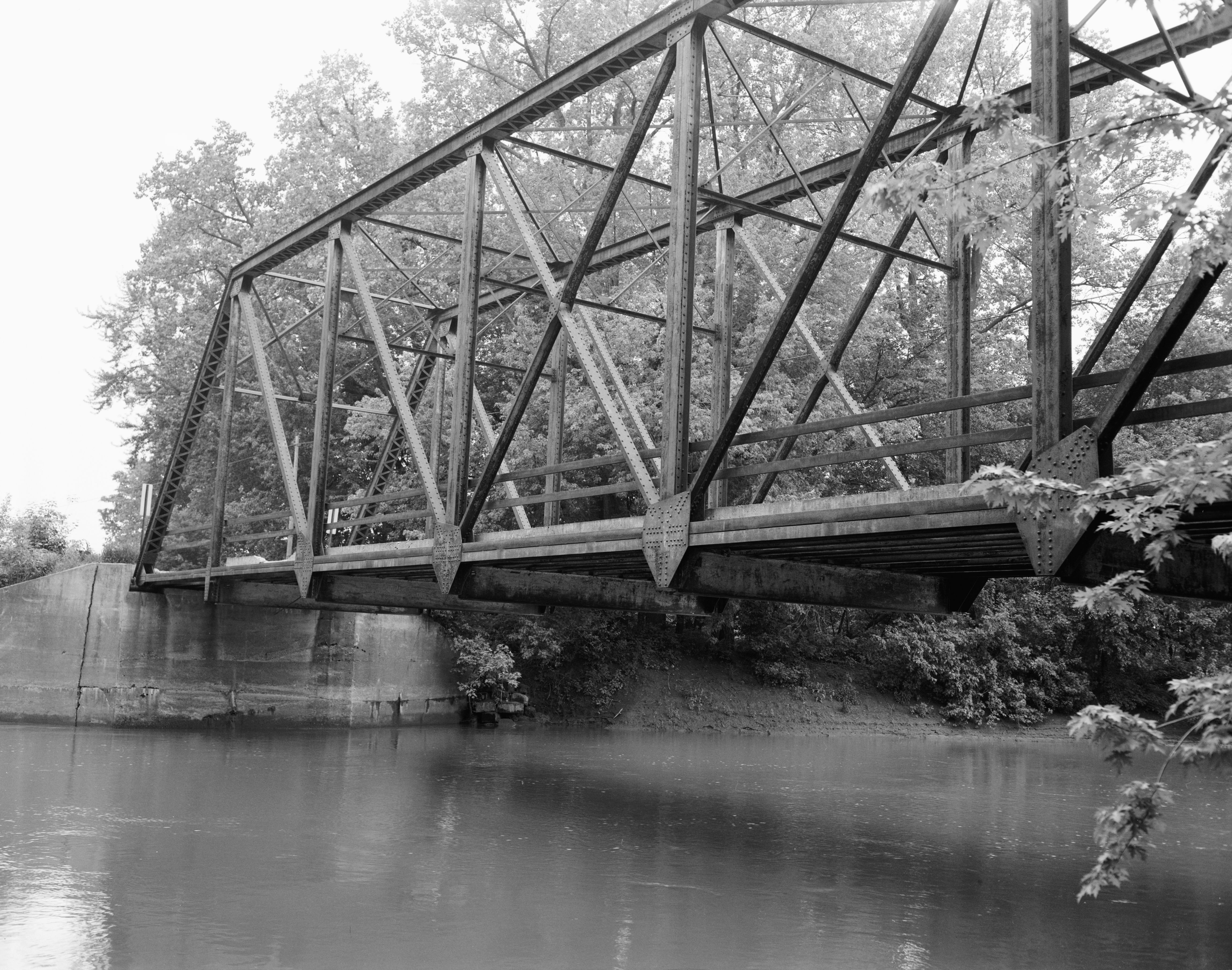
- The now destroyed Indian Ford Bridge near London Mills, Illinois.

- Location within Illinois Location within the United States
- Location: Fulton County, Illinois, USA
- Nearest city: London Mills
- Coordinates: 40°41′50″N 90°17′24″W
- Area: less than one acre
- Built: 1917
- MPS: Metal Highway Bridges of Fulton County TR
- NRHP reference No.: 80001357
- Added to NRHP: October 29, 1980

The Indian Ford Bridge was one of nine metal highway bridges in Fulton County, Illinois listed on the National Register of Historic Places. This particular one was located along County Highway 20 as spans the Spoon River, 1.5 miles (2.4 km) southwest of London Mills. It was added to the National Register of Historic Places on October 29, 1980, along with the eight other bridges, as one of the "Metal Highway Bridges of Fulton County." Some of the other bridges included London Mill's only other Registered Historic Place, the now demolished London Mills Bridge. Other demolished bridges include the Elrod Bridge, Duncan Mills Bridge and Buckeye Bridge.

Indian Ford Bridge is one of the five bridges submitted under the Fulton County Metal Highway Bridges Multiple Property Submission to have been demolished since its inclusion on the Register.

Indian Ford was a crossing of the Spoon River named by Job Babbit, an early Fulton County pioneer who helped survey a road from Farmington to Burlington in 1835 and named Union Township. According to Chapman's History of Fulton County (p. 886), Babbit discovered, where the road crossed the river, a trough made from an elm log that was fastened to the fork of a tree. It contained the skeletal remains of an American Indian.

== See also ==
- List of bridges documented by the Historic American Engineering Record in Illinois
