= Stephen A. Hoxworth =

American politician

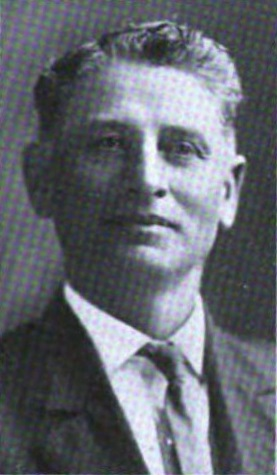
- From 1914's Blue Book of the State of Illinois

Member of the U.S. House of Representatives from Illinois's 15th district
- In office March 4, 1913 – March 3, 1915
- Preceded by: George W. Prince
- Succeeded by: Edward John King

Personal details
- Born: May 1, 1860 Maquon Township, Illinois, U.S.
- Died: January 25, 1930 (aged 69) Rapatee, Illinois, U.S.
- Party: Democratic

Stephen Arnold Hoxworth (May 1, 1860 – January 25, 1930) was a U.S. representative from Illinois.

Born in Maquon Township, near Maquon, Illinois, Hoxworth attended the public schools. He moved to Blue Springs, Nebraska, in 1880. He engaged in banking and in the grain and implement business. He served as member of the Nebraska State Militia. He returned to Illinois in 1885 and engaged in agricultural pursuits near Rapatee, Knox County. He served as supervisor of Maquon Township 1907–1912.

Hoxworth was elected as a Democrat to the Sixty-third Congress (March 4, 1913 – March 3, 1915). He was not a candidate for renomination in 1914. He resumed agricultural pursuits. He died in Rapatee, Illinois, January 25, 1930. He was interred in Lyons Cemetery.

U.S. House of Representatives
Preceded by George W. Prince	Member of the U.S. House of Representatives from Illinois's 15th congressional district 1913-1915	Succeeded by Edward John King
