= North Fulton High School =

North Fulton High School may refer to:

- North Fulton High School (Georgia) — a high school from 1920 to 1991, that merged into North Atlanta High School in the Buckhead section of Atlanta, Fulton County, Georgia, United States
- Atlanta International School — a private grade school and high school that moved in 1995 into the former North Fulton High School building in Buckhead, Atlanta, Fulton County, Georgia, United States
- Johns Creek High School — a high school established in 2009 in Johns Creek, Fulton County, Georgia, and temporarily referred to as the "North Fulton high school" during planning and construction
- North Fulton Cooperative — the combined high school sports teams of Cuba High School (Illinois) and Spoon River Valley High School in Fulton County, Illinois, United States, and using the Wildcats nickname
