= Prairieland Conference =

- Conference: IHSA
- No. of teams: 13
- Region: Western Central Illinois (Fulton, Knox, Mason, McDonough, Peoria, Schuyler, and Warren counties)

Locations
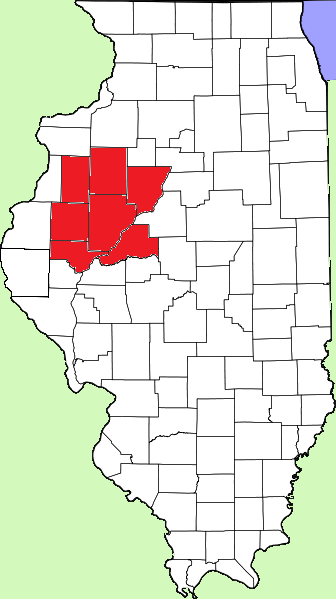
- The Prairieland Conference within Illinois

The Prairieland Conference is a high school athletic conference in western central Illinois. The conference participates in athletics and activities in the Illinois High School Association. The conference comprises small public high schools with enrollments between 50 and 400 students in portions of Fulton, Knox, Mason, McDonough, Peoria, Schuyler, and Warren counties.

== History ==
Formed in 1982, the Prairieland Conference had eight original members which included; Abingdon, Bushnell-Prairie City, Cuba, Elmwood, Farmington, Knoxville, Lewistown and London Mills (Spoon River Valley). Spoon River Valley would be the first school to leave the league, joining the Inter County Athletic Conference By 1990, Elmwood began a football coop with Brimfield but remained in the league. Meanwhile, Farmington and Knoxville would leave the conference and head to the Olympic Conference being replaced with schools from Havana and Astoria, who already had established a coop with Table Grove (VIT) for football. In 1995, Peoria Heights would join the conference. Coops would continue to form as Table Grove (VIT) and Astoria would join forces in 1997 and be known as South Fulton. Also in 1997, Spoon River Valley would return to the conference from the Bi-County Conference. Rounding out the 1990s, Petersburg (PORTA) would come into the league as well as a coop with Monmouth Yorkwood and Roseville in 1999. This would give the conference 10 teams for football.

Roseville and Monmouth Warren High Schools consolidated in 2004 to become Monmouth United. This would end the coop for Roseville with Yorkwood, however, Joy Westmer took the opportunity to join forces with Yorkwood and begin their coop that same year, pulling Yorkwood out of the conference into the Lincoln Trail. Yet another coop would form in 2006 as Cuba and Spoon River Valley would join forces and become known as North Fulton. Brimfield would fully join the league in 2008, leaving the Inter County Athletic. In 2009, Petersburg (PORTA) would leave the conference for the Sangamo Conference. Prior to the 2010 school year, Beardstown and Rushville-Industry would join the league and Farmington would make their return after being gone for 20 years. In 2013 Abingdon and Avon High Schools consolidated and Bushnell-Prairie City, West Prairie, North Fulton and Peoria Heights had opted to play 8-man football. Abingdon-Avon left the Prairieland and moved to the Lincoln Trail Conference in 2021. Sciota West Prairie moved to the Prairieland in 2014 from the Lincoln Trail Conference. Beardstown would leave the league in 2015 for the Western Illinois Valley. In 2018, Illini West would join the Prairieland, however, it would only stay for 3 years, returning to the West Central in 2021. In that same year, Macomb would leave the West Central and join the Prairieland. In 2022, the Cuba Spoon River Valley coop would join forces with Lewistown for football.

== Current membership ==
School	Location	Mascot	Colors	2017-18 Enrollment	IHSA Classes 2/3/4	IHSA Music Class	IHSA Football Class
Astoria; High School	Astoria, IL	Rebels	Purple, Green	110	A/1A/1A (VIT Coop - A/1A/1A)	D	1A (VIT Coop - 1A)
Brimfield; High School	Brimfield, IL	Indians	Red, White	225	A/1A/1A (Elmwood Coop- A/1A/2A)	C	1A (Elmwood Coop- 2A)
Bushnell-Prairie City; High School	Bushnell, IL	Spartans	Red, White, Blue	226	A/1A/1A	C	1A (West Prairie BWP Coop-2A)
Cuba; High School	Cuba, IL	Wildcats	Red, Black	142	A/1A/1A (SRV Coop- A/1A/1A)	D	1A (SRV Coop- 1A)
Elmwood; High School	Elmwood, IL	Trojans	Orange, Black	213	A/1A/1A (Brimfield Coop - A/1A/2A)	C	1A (Brimfield Coop - 2A)
Farmington High School	Farmington, IL	Farmers	Purple, Gold	413		B	3A
Havana; High School	Havana, IL	Ducks	Maroon, White	298	A/1A/1A	C	2A
Lewistown; High School	Lewistown, IL	Indians	Scarlet Red, Columbia Blue	220	A/1A/1A	C	1A
Macomb High School	Macomb, Illinois	Bombers	Orange and Black	581			
Peoria Heights; High School	Peoria Heights, IL	Patriots	Red, White, Blue	207	A/1A/1A	C	1A
Spoon River Valley; High School	London Mills, IL	Vikings	Black, Orange	109	A/1A/1A (Cuba Coop- A/1A/1A)	D	1A (Cuba Coop- 1A)
VIT; High School	Table Grove, IL	Rebels	White, Purple, Green	101	A/1A/1A (Astoria Coop- A/1A/1A)	D	1A (Astoria Coop- 1A)
West Prairie High School	Sciota, IL	Cyclones	Black, Silver	162	A/1A/1A (Bushnell-PC Coop 2A)		(BWP Coop-2A)

Sources:IHSA Conferences, IHSA Coop Teams, and IHSA Member Schools Directory

== Membership timeline ==
Full members Full members (non-football) Partial member (listed sports) Full members (8-man football) Full members (Football Coop)

=== Cooperative Arrangements ===
- Astoria+VIT=South Fulton
- Cuba+Spoon River Valley=North Fulton
- Havana+Illini Central for boys wrestling only
- Brimfield and Elmwood do not coop for basketball
- Bushnell-PC and West Prairie coop as BWP in baseball, football, softball and track. The schools do not coop in boys basketball, girls basketball, scholastic bowl or volleyball.

== Competitive Success ==
The Prairieland Conference has won 9 state championships in IHSA sponsored athletics and activities.

=== State Champions ===
Boys Baseball

- Lewistown (1992-1993 A)
- Peoria Heights (2017 1A)

Boys Basketball

- Brimfield (2015 1A)

Boys Cross Country

- Elmwood (1977-1978 A)
- Elmwood (1983-1984 A)
- Elmwood (1984-1985 A)
- Elmwood (1985-1986 A)
- Elmwood (2006-2007 A)
- Elmwood (2008-2009 1A)
- Elmwood (2013-2014 1A)
- Elmwood (2016-2017 1A)
- Elmwood (2017-2018 1A)

Boys Golf

- Havana (1998-1999 A)

Girls Basketball

- Brimfield (2022 1A)

Girls Volleyball

- West Prairie (2016 1A)
