= London Mills Bridge =

- U.S. National Register of Historic Places
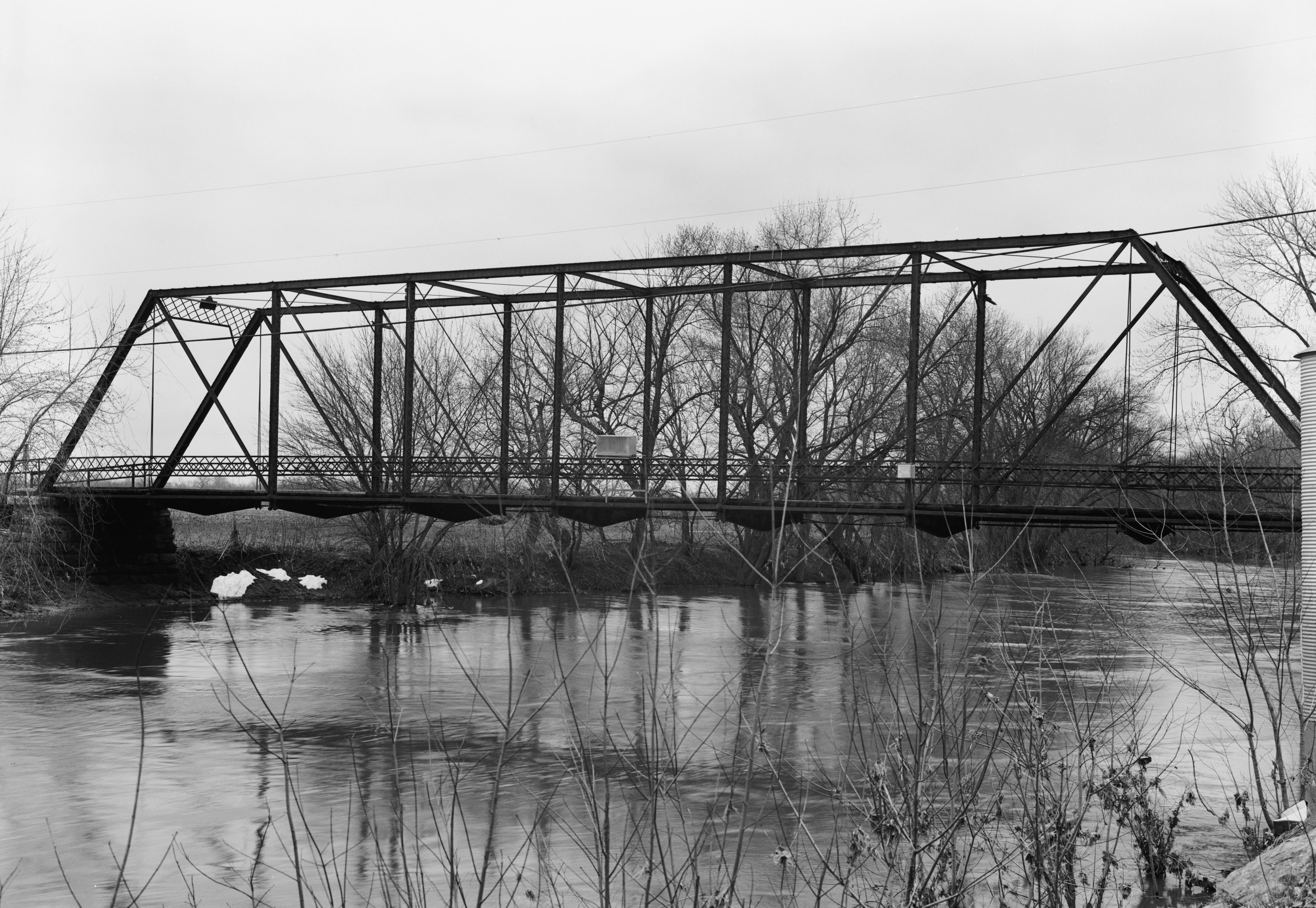
- The now demolished London Mills Bridge between Fulton and Knox Counties.

- Location within Illinois Location within the United States
- Location: County Highway 39, London Mills, Illinois
- Coordinates: 40°42′49″N 90°15′58″W
- Built: ca. 1917
- Architectural style: Pratt
- MPS: MPL011 - Metal Highway Bridges of Fulton County Thematic Resources
- NRHP reference No.: 80001358
- Added to NRHP: October 29, 1980

The London Mills Bridge was one of nine metal highway bridges in Fulton County, Illinois listed on the National Register of Historic Places. This particular one was located along County Highway 39 as it spans the Spoon River on the north side of London Mills. It was added to the National Register of Historic Places on October 29, 1980, along with the eight other bridges, as one of the "Metal Highway Bridges of Fulton County". Some of the other bridges included London Mill's only other Registered Historic Place, the Indian Ford Bridge.

London Mills Bridge and Indian Ford Bridge have both been demolished since their inclusion on the National Register of Historic Places.

== See also ==
- List of bridges documented by the Historic American Engineering Record in Illinois
