= Babylon Bend Bridge =

- U.S. National Register of Historic Places
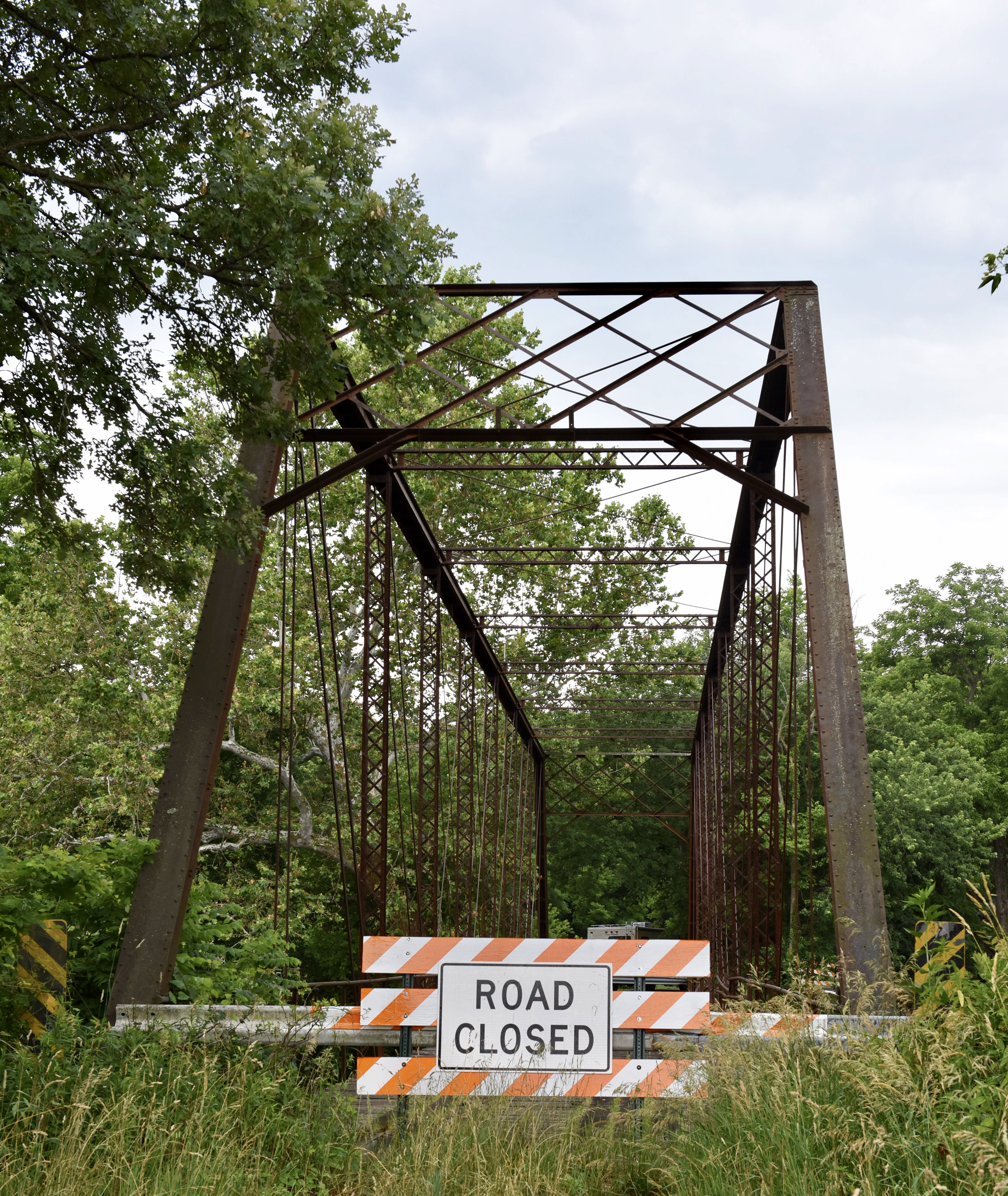

- Location within Illinois
- Location: Ellisville, Fulton County, Illinois, USA
- Coordinates: 40°35′25.2″N 90°20′52.6″W
- Area: less than one acre
- Built: 1890
- MPS: Metal Highway Bridges of Fulton County TR
- NRHP reference No.: 80001355
- Added to NRHP: October 29, 1980

The Babylon Bend Bridge is one of nine metal highway bridges in Fulton County, Illinois listed on the National Register of Historic Places and still standing. This bridge was built in 1890 over the Spoon River and is located along Illinois Route 123 near Ellisville. It was added to the National Register of Historic Places on October 29, 1980, along with the eight other bridges, as one of the "Metal Highway Bridges of Fulton County. Some of the other bridges included the now demolished Duncan Mills Bridge in Lewistown and the Indian Ford Bridge in London Mills, Illinois. In total, six of the nine bridges have been destroyed.
