= Spoon River Valley High School =

School in London Mills, Illinois, US

Location
- 35265 North IL Route 97; London Mills, Fulton & Knox Counties, Illinois 61544; USA; 40.70271°N 90.15587°W

Information
- Type: Comprehensive Public High School
- School district: Spoon River Valley Community Unit School District 4
- Principal: Christopher Janssen
- Teaching staff: 8.95 (FTE)
- Grades: 9–12
- Enrollment: 63 (2023–2024)
- Student to teacher ratio: 7.04
- Campus type: Rural
- Colors: Red, Black
- Athletics conference: Prairieland; Inter County Athletic
- Team name: Wildcats
- PSAE average: 41%
- Website: Spoon River Valley Schools Website

Spoon River Valley High School, also known as Spoon River Valley Senior High School, or SRVHS, is a public four-year high school located at 35265 North IL Route 97 east of London Mills, Illinois, a village in Fulton and Knox Counties, in the Midwestern United States, at the intersection of Illinois Routes 97 and 116. SRVHS is part of Spoon River Valley Community Unit School District 4, which serves the communities of Ellisville, Fairview, London Mills, Maquon, and Rapatee, and includes Spoon River Valley Junior High School, and Spoon River Valley Elementary School. The campus is located 15 miles (24 km) northwest of Canton, 20 miles (32 km) southeast of Galesburg, and serves a mixed village and rural residential community. The school districts lies within both the Canton and Galesburg micropolitan statistical areas.

== Enrollment ==
Spoon River Valley is a small school with an enrollment right at 145 students annually that commute daily from the neighboring villages and rural areas. The neighboring communities include: Maquon, Fairview, London Mills, Ellisville, and Rapatee.

== Location ==
Built in its current location, 35265 North IL Route 97, in 1973, the district has been around as early as 1949. The first school was located in Fairview.

Spoon River Valley High School is located 5 miles (8.0 km) north of Fairview, Illinois, 6 miles (9.7 km) east of London Mills and 7 miles (11 km) south of Maquon. It is nestled neatly at the southeast junction of Illinois Route 97 and Illinois Route 116.

== Academics ==
In 2009, Spoon River Valley High School did not make Adequate Yearly Progress, with 41% of students meeting/exceeding state standards, on the Prairie State Achievement Examination, a state test that is part of the No Child Left Behind Act. In 2010 Spoon River Valley saw the largest increase on the PSAE (with 52% meeting/exceeding) for the entire Peoria Journal Star Area. The school's average high school graduation rate between 1999-2009 was 94%.

== Sports ==
Spoon River Valley High School competes in the Prairieland Conference and Inter County Athletic Conference as a member school of the Illinois High School Association. The SRVHS mascot is the Vikings with colors of black and orange; however, they coop with neighboring Cuba High School for most athletics. Their combined name and mascot is the North Fulton Wildcats, with colors of red and black. The school has no state championships on record in team athletics and activities. The varsity football team, the North Fulton Wildcats, qualified for state tournament in 2007 and 2008, and reached the semi-finals in 2007.

== History ==
The history of Spoon River Valley High School is also the history of its component schools: Ellisville High School, Fairview High School, London Mills High School, and Maquon High School. SRVHS formed in 1948 when the Ellisville, Fairview, and London Mills schools consolidated, and Maquon joined in 1949 after a year consolidated with Knoxville High School. The high school was first located in Fairview, but later moved to a centralized rural setting east of London Mills when a new school building complex was completed in 1973.

=== Ellisville High School ===
The Pleasant Hill Academy is the first recorded school in Ellisville, Illinois. It opened in 1840. A community high school was later established in 1920 and served at the high school until the 1948 consolidation. The Ellisville high school mascot was the Eagles, with school colors of blue and silver. The combined Ellisville High School and Elementy School building continued to serve as a junior high and elementary school in the district until 1973, when a new school complex was built east of London Mills along Illinois Route 116 just south of the village of Raptee which serves all grades, K-12, in the district. The Ellisville school building was razed in the late 1980s.

=== Fairview High School ===
School are recorded in Fairview, Illinois as early as 1839, and a school named the Fairview Academy was established in 1863. A formal three year high school curriculum is known to have existed since 1897, and Fairview's first graduating class occurred in 1900. The four year curriculum was not adopted until 1908. The year 1900 also marked the completion of the village's new school building. Fairview High School's mascot was the Foxes, with school colors of orange and black. After outgrowing the 1900 building a 13-acre (53,000 m^{2}) parcel of land was purchased and new high school building was opened in the fall of 1922. When the consolidation of area schools occurred in 1948 Fairview High School was chosen to be the site of the consolidated Spoon River Valley High School. The building served as Spoon River Valley High School, sometimes called Valley High School, until 1973 when a modern and centralized school complex was completed east of London Mills. The 1922 Fairview High School building has been torn down.

=== London Mills High School ===
London Mills' schools originated in 1835. New buildings were completed in 1875 and 1912, with a gym addition occurring in 1936, and a final addition in 1939. The London High School mascot was the Lions, with school colors of orange and black. The school consolidated into the Spoon River Valley district in 1948. The 1912 building has since been torn down.

=== Maquon High School ===
Maquon first began building schools in the mid-to-late 19th century, with its first high school graduating class occurring in 1891. The first known building was completed in 1866, a simple two-story frame building. In 1904 a larger brick school building was completed adjacent to the original building, with a gym addition occurring in 1934. When the Spoon River Valley consolidation occurred in 1948 Maquon was originally part of the plan. However, in July before the 1948 school year began Maquon petition to detach from the newly formed Spoon River Valley in order to attend Knoxville schools. The petition was short-lived, as irregularities were found and Maqon reverted into the Spoon River Valley district under the original planned. Therefore, in 1949 the full Spoon River Valley High School was realized and students from Maquon were bused to Fairview, the location of the district's high school.

Because Spoon River Valley's villages continued to maintain separate grade and junior high schools, the remaining Maquon High School building continued to be used as a junior high school for grades 7, 8 and 9 until 1973 when the present Spoon River Valley High, Junior High and Grade School complex was completed east of London Mills. The 1904 building still stands today.
