= Tarter's Ferry Bridge =

- U.S. National Register of Historic Places
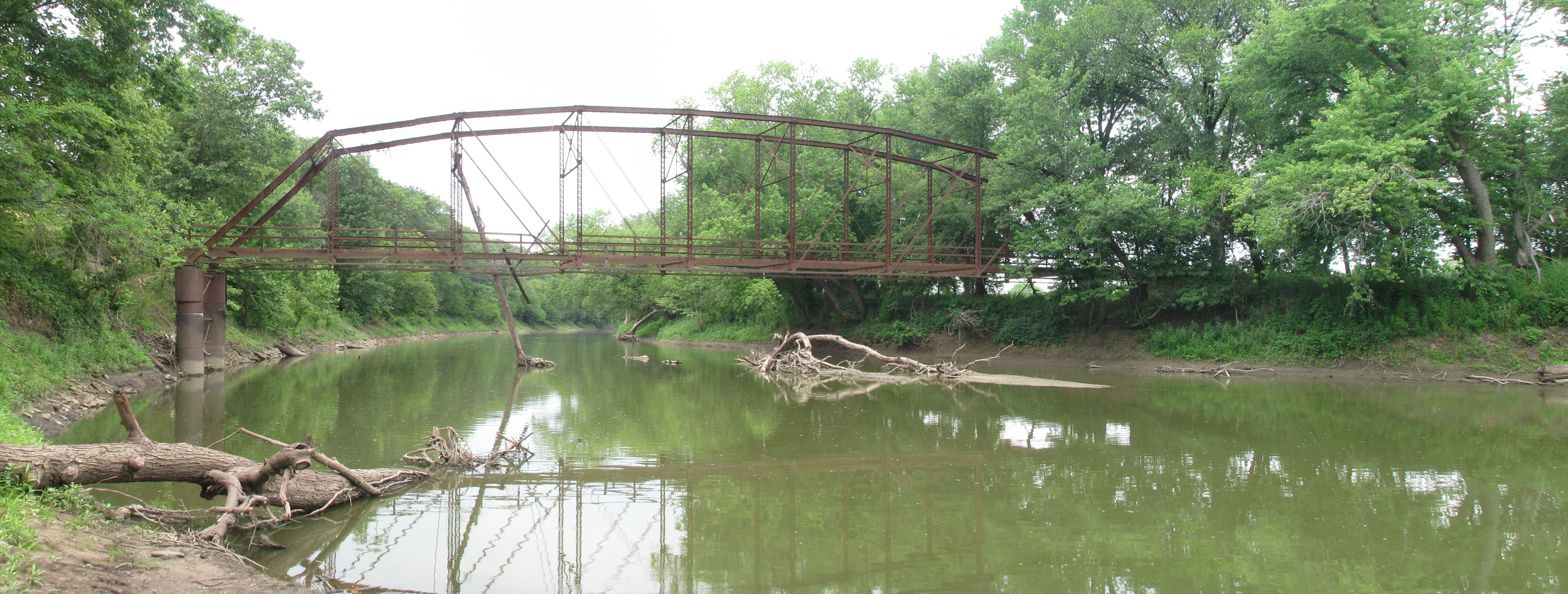
- 2012 view of the abandoned bridge, facing west

- Location within Illinois Location within the United States
- Location: Fulton County, Illinois
- Nearest city: Smithfield
- Coordinates: 40°28′23″N 90°17′34″W
- Area: less than one acre
- Built: ca. 1880
- Architectural style: Pin connected Parker through truss
- MPS: MPL011 - Metal Highway Bridges of Fulton County Thematic Resources
- NRHP reference No.: 80001363
- Added to NRHP: October 29, 1980

Tarter's Ferry Bridge was one of nine metal highway bridges in Fulton County, Illinois listed on the National Register of Historic Places. This particular one was a 9-panel Parker through truss that carried Tarter Ferry Road over the Spoon River near Smithfield, Illinois. It was added to the National Register of Historic Places on October 29, 1980, along with the eight other bridges, as one of the "Metal Highway Bridges of Fulton County. The bridge was one of three in Smithfield listed on the Register, the others are the Bernadotte Bridge and the destroyed Buckeye Bridge, as well as the demolished Elrod Bridge. Others, such as the Duncan Mills Bridge in Lewistown, are located throughout the county.

The bridge was washed off its substructure during a flood in the spring of 2013. It had been abandoned for many years.
