= Cass Township, Fulton County, Illinois =

Cass Township
- Township
- Location in Fulton County

- Fulton County's location in Illinois
- Coordinates: 40°29′41″N 90°16′54″W
- Country: United States
- State: Illinois
- County: Fulton
- Established: November 6, 1849

Area
  - Total: 39.55 sq mi (102.4 km^{2})
  - Land: 39.40 sq mi (102.0 km^{2})
  - Water: 0.15 sq mi (0.39 km^{2}) 0.37%
- Elevation: 630 ft (192 m)

Population (2020)
  - Total: 561
  - Density: 14.2/sq mi (5.50/km^{2})
- Time zone: UTC-6 (CST)
  - Summer (DST): UTC-5 (CDT)
- ZIP codes: 61427, 61477, 61542
- FIPS code: 17-057-11696

Cass Township is one of twenty-six townships in Fulton County, Illinois, USA. As of the 2020 census, its population was 561 and it contained 253 housing units.

== Geography ==
According to the 2021 census gazetteer files, Cass Township has a total area of 39.55 square miles (102.43 km^{2}), of which 39.40 square miles (102.05 km^{2}) (or 99.63%) is land and 0.15 square miles (0.39 km^{2}) (or 0.37%) is water.

=== Cities, towns, villages ===
- Smithfield

=== Unincorporated towns ===
- Buckeye
- Poverty Ridge

(This list is based on USGS data and may include former settlements.)

- Totten Prairie
- Gobbler's Knob
- Travis was an old town site near Poverty Ridge which was near seville and the old fuller mill. It is said that the foundation of the mill can still be found. Travis did not become nothing but an old forgotten town site which never organized.

=== Cemeteries ===
The township contains these six cemeteries: Baughman, Buckeye, Fuller, Henderson, Howard and Sinnett Chapel.

=== Major highways ===
- Illinois Route 95

== Demographics ==
As of the 2020 census there were 561 people, 227 households, and 154 families residing in the township. The population density was 14.19 inhabitants per square mile (5.48/km^{2}). There were 253 housing units at an average density of 6.40 per square mile (2.47/km^{2}). The racial makeup of the township was 95.37% White, 0.00% African American, 0.18% Native American, 0.71% Asian, 0.00% Pacific Islander, 0.53% from other races, and 3.21% from two or more races. Hispanic or Latino of any race were 1.25% of the population.

There were 227 households, out of which 30.80% had children under the age of 18 living with them, 56.39% were married couples living together, 7.93% had a female householder with no spouse present, and 32.16% were non-families. 30.00% of all households were made up of individuals, and 14.10% had someone living alone who was 65 years of age or older. The average household size was 2.30 and the average family size was 2.82.

The township's age distribution consisted of 21.9% under the age of 18, 8.3% from 18 to 24, 13.2% from 25 to 44, 28.1% from 45 to 64, and 28.6% who were 65 years of age or older. The median age was 49.7 years. For every 100 females, there were 126.5 males. For every 100 females age 18 and over, there were 120.0 males.

The median income for a household in the township was $55,313, and the median income for a family was $63,750. Males had a median income of $36,875 versus $31,250 for females. The per capita income for the township was $25,437. About 5.2% of families and 4.6% of the population were below the poverty line, including 7.0% of those under age 18 and 2.0% of those age 65 or over.

Historical population
Census	Pop.	Note	%±
2000	737		—
2010	622		−15.6%
2020	561		−9.8%
U.S. Decennial Census

== School districts ==
- Community Unit School District 3 Fulton City

== Political districts ==
- Illinois's 17th congressional district
- State House District 94
- State Senate District 47
