= Totten Prairie, Illinois =

Coordinates: 40°27′50.5″N 90°16′1.1″W

Totten Prairie or Totten's Prairie was a small settlement in Cass Township, Fulton County, Illinois, just to the southeast of the present Smithfield, Illinois. It was named after William Totten, who was the first to settle there in 1823. A small cemetery, called Totten Cemetery or Old Totten's Prairie Cemetery, still exists in that location.

The 1879 History of Fulton County, Illinois contains the following entry for William Totten:

When the red man was sporting over the prairie of Illinois and when the wolves were prowling through the forests, William Totten placed his family and effects in a one-horse cart in Ohio and found his way to Kentucky, thence to Indiana, and finally to Fulton Co., where in 1823 he settled on the well-known Totten's Prairie. It would require a large volume to recount all the incidents of his frontier life in Fulton Co. Mr. Totten was remarkable for retaining peace with the Indians. When on the war path they would visit him, trade and sport with him and leave peaceably. He was the first settler in Cass township, and settled on sec. 27. The widow of William Totten still lives on the old homestead with her son John Totten at the age of 84 years. John Totten followed the occupation of hunting for many years, raising such grain as was needed for family use. He was married in 1847 to Barbary Baughman. Their son, Michael P. Totten, was born in Fulton Co., Oct. 18, 1850; was educated in the common schools of this county; is a well-to-do farmer. Miss Almira, daughter of John Totten, is but 13 years of age, and is a remarkably good scholar for her age. Mrs. Totten was educated in Ohio, and came here with her parents in 1832. P. O., Smithfield."

—
