= Cuba High School =

Cuba High School may refer to:

- Cuba High School (Illinois), a public secondary school south of Cuba, Fulton County, Illinois, U.S.
- Cuba High School (Missouri), a public secondary school in Cuba, Crawford County, Missouri, U.S.
- Cuba High School (New Mexico), a public secondary school in Cuba, Sandoval County, New Mexico, U.S.
- Cuba City High School, a public secondary school in Cuba, Grant County, Wisconsin, U.S.
