= Buckeye Bridge =

- U.S. National Register of Historic Places
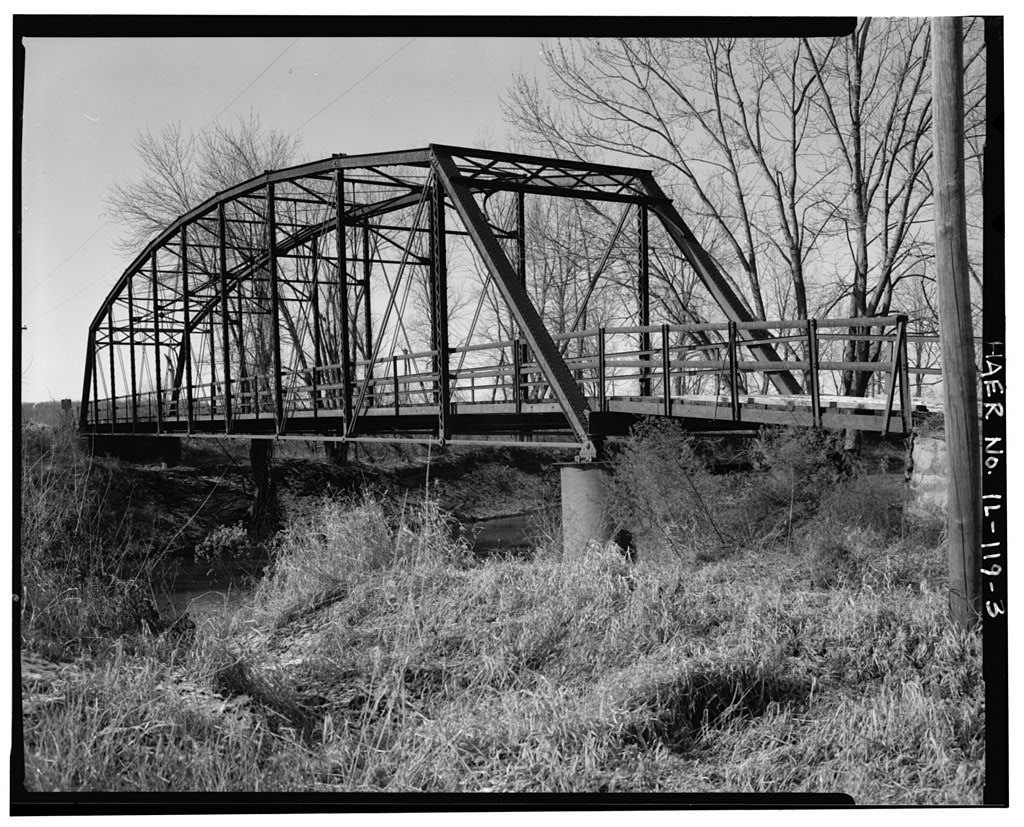
- Former bridge over the Spoon river. Removed in 1994

- Location within Illinois Location within the United States
- Location: Smithfield, Fulton County, Illinois, USA
- Coordinates: 40°28′23″N 90°17′34″W
- Built: 1910
- MPS: MPL011 - Metal Highway Bridges of Fulton County Thematic Resources
- NRHP reference No.: 80001361
- Added to NRHP: October 29, 1980

Buckeye Bridge also known as White's Ferry Bridge was one of nine metal highway bridges in Fulton County, Illinois once listed on the National Register of Historic Places. Buckeye is one of the five bridges that have been demolished out of nine similar bridges in the county. This particular one was over the Spoon River near Smithfield, Illinois. It was added to the National Register of Historic Places on October 29, 1980, along with the eight other bridges, as one of the "Metal Highway Bridges of Fulton County". The bridge was one of three near Smithfield listed on the Register, the others are the Bernadotte Bridge and the Tartar's Ferry Bridge. Others, such as the Babylon Bend Bridge in Ellisville, are located throughout the county. Another Smithfield area bridge, Elrod Bridge, was nominated with the original Multiple Property Submission but removed from the Register after its 1995 destruction by an F-4 tornado.

The Buckeye Bridge is one of the bridges in this particular Multiple Property Submission that has been demolished since its inclusion in the National Register of Historic Places in 1980.
