= VIT High School =

V.I.T. High School

Location
- 1500 East U.S. 136; Table Grove, Fulton County, Illinois 61482; USA; 40.35716°N 90.41795°W

Information
- Type: Comprehensive Public High School
- School district: V.I.T. Community Unit School District 2
- Principal: Mark Darr
- Teaching staff: 12.68 (FTE)
- Grades: 9–12
- Enrollment: 83 (2023-2024)
- Student to teacher ratio: 6.55
- Campus type: Rural
- Colors: Purple, Green
- Athletics conference: Prairieland
- Mascot: Rebels
- PSAE average: 41%
- Website: V.I.T. Schools Website

V.I.T. High School, or VHS, is a public four-year high school located at 1500 U.S. Hwy. 136 East near Table Grove, Illinois, a village in Fulton County, Illinois, in the Midwestern United States. VHS is part of V.I.T. Community Unit School District 2, which serves the communities of Vermont, Ipava, and Table Grove (V.I.T), and includes V.I.T. Junior High School, and V.I.T. Elementary School. The campus is located 30 miles southwest of Canton, IL, and serves a mixed village and rural residential community. The school lies within the Canton micropolitan statistical area.

== Academics ==
In 2009 V.I.T. High School did not make Adequate Yearly Progress, with 41% of students meeting standards, on the Prairie State Achievement Examination, a state test that is part of the No Child Left Behind Act. The school's average high school graduation rate between 1999-2009 was 95%.

== Athletics ==
V.I.T. High School competes in the Prairieland Conference and is a member school in the Illinois High School Association. It coops with neighboring Astoria High School for most athletics. Their combined name and mascot is the South Fulton Rebels. The school has no state championships on record in team athletics and activities.

== History ==
The history of V.I.T. High School is also the history of its component schools, Vermont High School, Ipava High School, and Table Grove High School. VHS formed in 1947 when the three schools consolidated.

=== Vermont High School ===
It is believed that a high school existed in the town of Vermont, Illinois since the late 19th century. However, the late 1940s brought the pressure of consolidation throughout the state of Illinois, especially smaller towns like Vermont, Ipava, and Table Grove. In 1947, the three towns consolidated to create the Vermont-Ipava-Table Grove (V.I.T.) School District. The schools for the district are now located just south of Table Grove.

=== Ipava High School ===
Education existed in Ipava, Illinois since the early 19th century with a stone building built in 1830 serving as the first school building. Another building was built in the 1850s. The first high school class graduated in 1884. The Ipava High School mascot was the Bulldog and its colors were blue and gold. After several decades of high school education, in the mid-1940s talks arose of a consolidation with the nearby school districts in Table Grove and Vermont. The consolidation became a reality in 1947 with the creation of the Vermont-Ipava-Table Grove School District. The Ipava school continued to host grades 1 - 6 for the V.I.T. school district for several years after the consolidation. A new elementary school was built near the V.I.T. high school in the 1970s. After this time the former Ipava school building served as a senior citizens center for a short while before being razed.

=== Table Grove High School ===
Table Grove's first school house was established in 1845. A high school was later started in the late 1880s, with its first graduate in 1891. A newer community high school was incorporated in 1920. Consolidation talks arose in the 1940s with the neighboring towns of Ipava and Vermont. The actual consolidation occurred in 1947 with the establishment of the Vermont-Ipava-Table Grove (V.I.T.) School District. A large and new complex was developed near Table Grove to house the students of the new district for all grades K-12.
