= Gilson, Illinois =

- Census-designated place
- Interactive map of Gilson, Illinois
- Coordinates: 40°51′46″N 90°11′57″W
- Country: United States
- State: Illinois
- County: Knox
- Township: Haw Creek

Area
  - Total: 0.33 sq mi (0.86 km^{2})
  - Land: 0.33 sq mi (0.86 km^{2})
  - Water: 0 sq mi (0.00 km^{2})
- Elevation: 682 ft (208 m)

Population (2020)
  - Total: 156
  - Density: 471.5/sq mi (182.03/km^{2})
- Time zone: UTC-6 (CST)
  - Summer (DST): UTC-5 (CDT)
- FIPS code: 17-29340
- GNIS feature ID: 2628550

Gilson is an unincorporated census-designated place in Knox County, Illinois, and is located southeast of Galesburg. As of the 2020 Census, its population was 156. It is part of the Galesburg Micropolitan Statistical Area. Gilson is located just east of Illinois Route 97 along Knox County Highway 12. The BNSF Railway runs through the town.

== Geography ==
Gilson lies on a flat plain yielding to hills and valleys close to Haw Creek, west of the town. The area is agricultural with corn, soybeans, hay, wheat, and hogs as the major commodities raised. Small parcels of timber are also located in several areas near Gilson.

According to the 2021 census gazetteer files, Gilson has a total area of 0.33 square miles (0.85 km^{2}), all land.

== Demographics ==
Historical population
Census	Pop.	Note	%±
2020	156		—
U.S. Decennial Census

As of the 2020 census there were 156 people, 63 households, and 63 families residing in the CDP. The population density was 471.30 inhabitants per square mile (181.97/km^{2}). There were 76 housing units at an average density of 229.61 per square mile (88.65/km^{2}). The racial makeup of the CDP was 92.95% White, 0.00% African American, 1.28% Native American, 0.00% Asian, 0.00% Pacific Islander, 1.28% from other races, and 4.49% from two or more races. Hispanic or Latino of any race were 1.92% of the population.

There were 63 households, out of which 31.7% had children under the age of 18 living with them, 68.25% were married couples living together, 31.75% had a female householder with no husband present, and 0.00% were non-families. 0.00% of all households were made up of individuals, and 0.00% had someone living alone who was 65 years of age or older. The average household size was 3.08 and the average family size was 3.08.

The CDP's age distribution consisted of 14.4% under the age of 18, 24.2% from 18 to 24, 19.1% from 25 to 44, 30.4% from 45 to 64, and 11.9% who were 65 years of age or older. The median age was 39.3 years. For every 100 females, there were 76.4 males. For every 100 females age 18 and over, there were 64.4 males.

The median income for a household in the CDP was $105,694, and the median income for a family was $105,694. Males had a median income of $64,722 versus $14,671 for females. The per capita income for the CDP was $33,079. About 19.0% of families and 16.5% of the population were below the poverty line, including 71.4% of those under age 18 and none of those age 65 or over.
