= Duncan Mills Bridge =

- U.S. National Register of Historic Places
- Location within Illinois Location within the United States
- Location: Fulton County, Illinois, USA
- Nearest city: Lewistown
- Coordinates: 40°20′28″N 90°11′27″W
- Built: 1910
- Built by: Illinois Steel Bridge Co.
- Architectural style: Parker truss
- MPS: MPL011 - Metal Highway Bridges of Fulton County Thematic Resources
- NRHP reference No.: 80001356
- Added to NRHP: October 29, 1980

The Duncan Mills Bridge was one of nine metal highway bridges in Fulton County, Illinois nominated for the National Register of Historic Places. This particular one was located along west of Havana, Illinois near Lewistown. It was added to the National Register of Historic Places on October 29, 1980, along with the seven of the eight other bridges, as one of the "Metal Highway Bridges of Fulton County". Some of the other bridges include the now demolished Buckeye Bridge and the Tartar's Ferry Bridge, both near Smithfield.

The Duncan Mills Bridge is one of the four bridges submitted under the Fulton County Metal Highway Bridges Multiple Property Submission to have been demolished since its inclusion on the Register.
