= Haw Creek Township, Knox County, Illinois =

Haw Creek Township
- Township
- Location in Knox County

- Knox County's location in Illinois
- Coordinates: 40°50′28″N 90°09′12″W
- Country: United States
- State: Illinois
- County: Knox
- Established: November 2, 1852

Government
  - Road Commissioner: Tim Rickard

Area
  - Total: 35.77 sq mi (92.6 km^{2})
  - Land: 35.77 sq mi (92.6 km^{2})
  - Water: 0 sq mi (0 km^{2}) 0%
- Elevation: 650 ft (198 m)

Population (2020)
  - Total: 383
  - Density: 10.7/sq mi (4.13/km^{2})
- Time zone: UTC-6 (CST)
  - Summer (DST): UTC-5 (CDT)
- ZIP codes: 61428, 61436, 61458
- FIPS code: 17-095-33552

Haw Creek Township is one of twenty-one townships in Knox County, Illinois, USA. As of the 2020 census, its population was 383 and it contained 187 housing units. Its name was changed from Ohio township on June 8, 1853.

== Geography ==
According to the 2021 census gazetteer files, Haw Creek Township has a total area of 35.77 square miles (92.64 km^{2}), all land.

=== Cities, towns, villages ===
- Maquon (north edge)

=== Unincorporated towns ===
- Gilson at 40.861705°N 90.201511°W

=== Cemeteries ===
The township contains these five cemeteries: Clark Chapel, Gilson, Harshbarger, Maquon and Russell.

== Demographics ==
As of the 2020 census there were 383 people, 98 households, and 85 families residing in the township. The population density was 10.71 inhabitants per square mile (4.14/km^{2}). There were 187 housing units at an average density of 5.23 per square mile (2.02/km^{2}). The racial makeup of the township was 95.82% White, 0.00% African American, 0.52% Native American, 0.00% Asian, 0.00% Pacific Islander, 0.78% from other races, and 2.87% from two or more races. Hispanic or Latino of any race were 0.78% of the population.

There were 98 households, out of which 25.50% had children under the age of 18 living with them, 61.22% were married couples living together, 25.51% had a female householder with no spouse present, and 13.27% were non-families. 7.10% of all households were made up of individuals, and 0.00% had someone living alone who was 65 years of age or older. The average household size was 2.64 and the average family size was 2.80.

The township's age distribution consisted of 12.7% under the age of 18, 20.8% from 18 to 24, 19.7% from 25 to 44, 32% from 45 to 64, and 14.7% who were 65 years of age or older. The median age was 41.9 years. For every 100 females, there were 79.9 males. For every 100 females age 18 and over, there were 73.8 males.

The median income for a household in the township was $107,222, and the median income for a family was $107,361. Males had a median income of $66,458 versus $33,125 for females. The per capita income for the township was $38,269. About 14.1% of families and 15.1% of the population were below the poverty line, including 60.6% of those under age 18 and 0.0% of those age 65 or over.

Historical population
Census	Pop.	Note	%±
2010	461		—
2020	383		−16.9%
U.S. Decennial Census

== School districts ==
- Farmington Central Community Unit School District 265
- Knoxville Community Unit School District 202
- Spoon River Valley Community Unit School District 4

== Political districts ==
- Illinois's 17th congressional district
- State House District 74
- State Senate District 37
