= Young Hickory Township, Fulton County, Illinois =

Young Hickory Township
- Township
- Location in Fulton County

- Fulton County's location in Illinois
- Coordinates: 40°40′27″N 90°14′57″W
- Country: United States
- State: Illinois
- County: Fulton
- Established: November 6, 1849

Area
  - Total: 24.2 sq mi (63 km^{2})
  - Land: 24.2 sq mi (63 km^{2})
  - Water: 0 sq mi (0 km^{2}) 0%
- Elevation: 636 ft (194 m)

Population (2020)
  - Total: 548
  - Density: 22.6/sq mi (8.74/km^{2})
- Time zone: UTC-6 (CST)
  - Summer (DST): UTC-5 (CDT)
- ZIP codes: 61415, 61431, 61432, 61544
- FIPS code: 17-057-84077

Young Hickory Township is one of twenty-six townships in Fulton County, Illinois, USA. As of the 2020 census, its population was 548 and it contained 260 housing units.

== Geography ==
According to the 2021 census gazetteer files, Young Hickory Township has a total area of 24.22 square miles (62.73 km^{2}), all land.

=== Cities, towns, villages ===
- London Mills (south three-quarters)

=== Extinct towns ===
- Midway at 40.698650°N 90.243457°W

(These towns are listed as "historical" by the USGS.)

=== Cemeteries ===
The township contains these three cemeteries: Beer, East Midway and West Midway.

=== Major highways ===
- Illinois Route 116

== Demographics ==
As of the 2020 census there were 548 people, 285 households, and 206 families residing in the township. The population density was 22.63 inhabitants per square mile (8.74/km^{2}). There were 260 housing units at an average density of 10.74 per square mile (4.15/km^{2}). The racial makeup of the township was 96.17% White, 0.55% African American, 0.18% Native American, 0.00% Asian, 0.00% Pacific Islander, 0.00% from other races, and 3.10% from two or more races. Hispanic or Latino of any race were 1.28% of the population.

There were 285 households, out of which 29.10% had children under the age of 18 living with them, 59.65% were married couples living together, 7.37% had a female householder with no spouse present, and 27.72% were non-families. 24.90% of all households were made up of individuals, and 7.40% had someone living alone who was 65 years of age or older. The average household size was 2.43 and the average family size was 2.87.

The township's age distribution consisted of 26.0% under the age of 18, 3.6% from 18 to 24, 25.9% from 25 to 44, 27.2% from 45 to 64, and 17.2% who were 65 years of age or older. The median age was 38.7 years. For every 100 females, there were 85.5 males. For every 100 females age 18 and over, there were 109.8 males.

The median income for a household in the township was $61,645, and the median income for a family was $85,455. Males had a median income of $50,694 versus $30,603 for females. The per capita income for the township was $34,992. About 1.9% of families and 3.6% of the population were below the poverty line, including none of those under age 18 and none of those age 65 or over.

Historical population
Census	Pop.	Note	%±
2000	728		—
2010	618		−15.1%
2020	548		−11.3%
U.S. Decennial Census

== School districts ==
- Avon Community Unit School District 176
- Spoon River Valley Community Unit School District 4

== Political districts ==
- Illinois' 17th congressional district
- State House District 94
- State Senate District 47
