= Seibert Q. Duntley =

American physicist (1911–1999)

Siebert Q. Duntley
- Born: October 2, 1911
- Died: October 22, 1999 (aged 88); La Jolla, California
- Scientific career
- Fields: Physics

Seibert Quimby Duntley was an American physicist. He was born in Bushnell, Illinois, on October 2, 1911.

== Education ==
He received an SB in physics from the Massachusetts Institute of Technology in 1933. Duntley received an MS degree from the California Institute of Technology in 1935 and an Sc.D. in physics from MIT in 1939.

== Career ==
While at MIT, Duntley met and worked with Karl Taylor Compton, Harold Eugene Edgerton, and many other prominent physicists. Duntley's primary interest was in applied physics particularly the optics of turbid media.

He started the Visibility Laboratory at the Massachusetts Institute of Technology in 1939/40. It was the brainchild of Duntley and MIT physics chair Dr. Arthur C. Hardy. It was focused on applying optics to such problems as camouflage, misdirection of aerial bombardment, target location, visibility of submerged objects at sea. In 1952, Roger Revelle and Quimby Duntley agreed that the laboratory would become part of the Scripps Institution of Oceanography in San Diego, and the U.S. Navy Bureau of Ships agreed to pay for the move. The work of the laboratory centered on the transmission of visible light through the atmosphere and water and the related problems of image formation and recognition. The nature of much of the research required measurements of the optical properties of the ocean or atmosphere for which no instruments existed. As a result of these requirements, many unique and very specialized instruments were developed by the laboratory, many of which were based on concepts or optical designs devised by Duntley. He earned the academic rank of professor in 1966 and taught at Scripps Institution of Oceanography and at the Department of Applied Physics and Information Science (APIS) at the University of California, San Diego until his retirement.

== Institutional affiliations and awards ==
Duntley was an active member of many professional associations, particularly the Optical Society of America, where he was a member of the inaugural class of Fellows in 1959, and Sigma Xi. He was president of the Optical Society of America in 1965. He was chairman of the Representatives of the Optical Society on the U.S. National Committee of the International Commission on Illumination. During the 1960s he was a member of the Armed Forces-National Research Council Committee on Vision. He was a participant in the 1971 JASON Laser Summer Study. He chaired the David Richardson Medal Committee of the Optical Society of America from 1972 to 1975. He received many awards, including the Army-Navy Certificate of Appreciation and, in 1961, the Frederic Ives Medal, the highest award of the Optical Society of America, "recognizing overall distinction in optics." Quimby Duntley died in La Jolla on October 22, 1999.

== See also ==
- Optical Society of America#Past Presidents of the OSA
