= Edward John King =

American politician

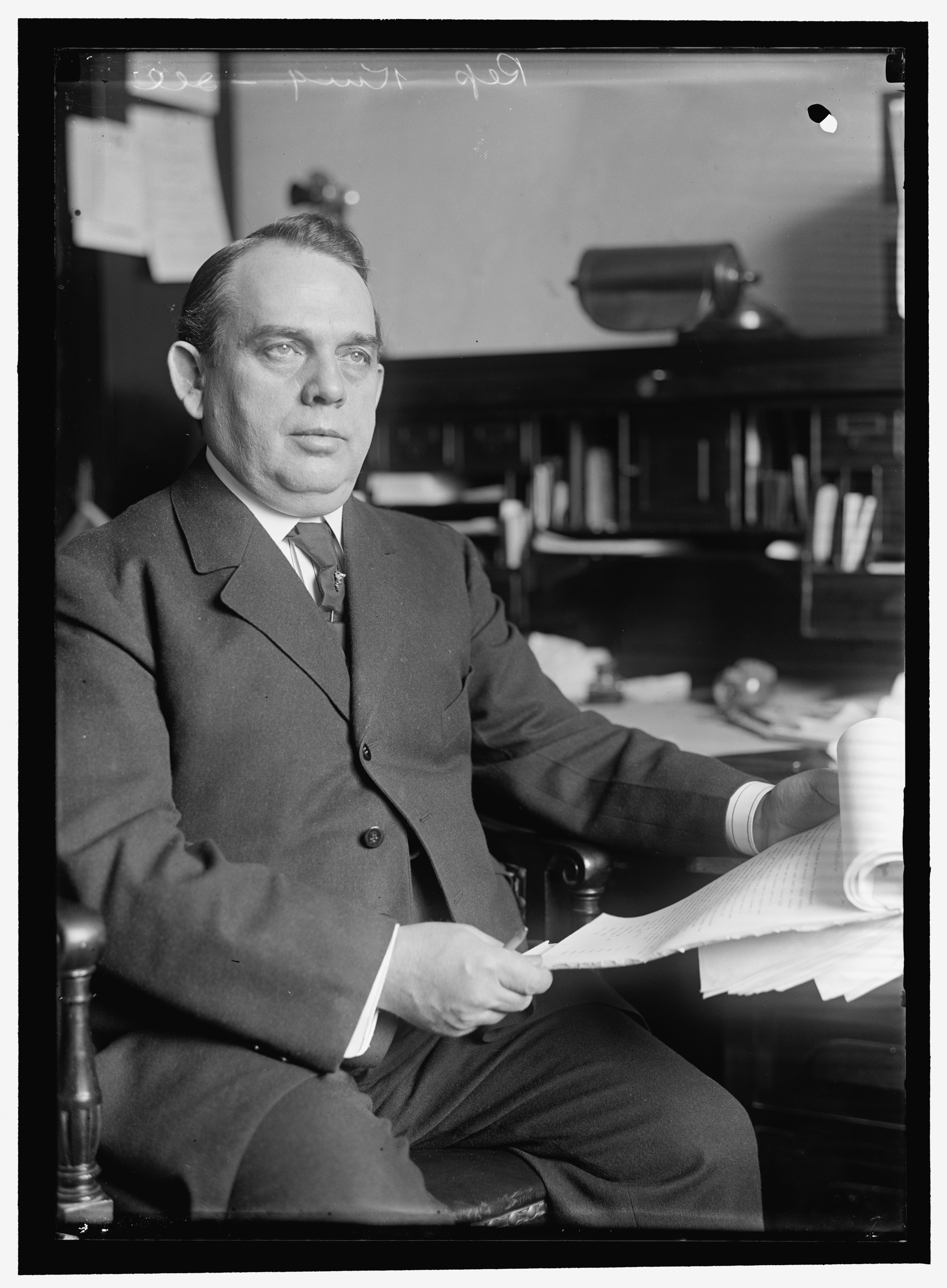

Member of the U.S. House of Representatives from Illinois's 15th district
- In office March 4, 1915 – February 17, 1929
- Preceded by: Stephen A. Hoxworth
- Succeeded by: Burnett M. Chiperfield

Member of the Illinois House of Representatives
- In office 1907-1914

Personal details
- Born: July 1, 1867 Springfield, Massachusetts, U.S.
- Died: February 17, 1929 (aged 61) Washington, D.C., U.S.
- Party: Republican

Edward John King (July 1, 1867 – February 17, 1929) was a U.S. representative from Illinois.

Born in Springfield, Massachusetts, King moved to Illinois with his parents, who settled in Galesburg, Knox County, in 1880. He attended the public schools, and Knox College at Galesburg, Illinois. He studied law. He was admitted to the bar in 1893 and commenced practice in Galesburg, Illinois. He was city attorney in 1893 and 1894. He served as member of the State house of representatives 1907–1914.

King was elected as a Republican to the Sixty-fourth and to the six succeeding Congresses and served from March 4, 1915, until his death. On April 5, 1917, he, with 49 other Representatives, voted against declaring war on Germany. He served as chairman of the Committee on Expenditures in the Department of Agriculture (Sixty-seventh through Sixty-ninth Congresses). He had been reelected to the Seventy-first Congress, but died in office in Washington, D.C., February 17, 1929. He was interred in Hope Abbey Mausoleum, Hope Cemetery, Galesburg, Illinois.

== See also ==
- List of members of the United States Congress who died in office (1900–1949)

U.S. House of Representatives
Preceded by Stephen A. Hoxworth	Member of the U.S. House of Representatives from Illinois's 15th congressional district March 4, 1915 - February 17, 1929	Succeeded by Burnett M. Chiperfield
