= Ellisville Township, Fulton County, Illinois =

Ellisville Township
- Township
- Location in Fulton County

- Fulton County's location in Illinois
- Coordinates: 40°39′49″N 90°18′02″W
- Country: United States
- State: Illinois
- County: Fulton
- Established: November 6, 1849

Area
  - Total: 13.91 sq mi (36.0 km^{2})
  - Land: 13.89 sq mi (36.0 km^{2})
  - Water: 0.02 sq mi (0.052 km^{2}) 0.14%
- Elevation: 522 ft (159 m)

Population (2020)
  - Total: 135
  - Density: 9.72/sq mi (3.75/km^{2})
- Time zone: UTC-6 (CST)
  - Summer (DST): UTC-5 (CDT)
- ZIP codes: 61415, 61431, 61544
- FIPS code: 17-057-23542

Ellisville Township is one of twenty-six townships in Fulton County, Illinois, USA. As of the 2020 census, its population was 135 and it contained 62 housing units.

== History ==
Ellisville Township is named for Levi D. Ellis, an early settler.

== Geography ==
According to the 2021 census gazetteer files, Ellisville Township has a total area of 13.91 square miles (36.03 km^{2}), of which 13.89 square miles (35.97 km^{2}) (or 99.86%) is land and 0.02 square miles (0.05 km^{2}) (or 0.14%) is water.

=== Cities, towns, villages ===
- Ellisville

=== Extinct towns ===
- Ellisville Station, a mining community on Narrow Gauge Railroad until the 1920s, consisted of a railroad depot, grocery store, butcher shop and barber shop plus numerous company-owned miner's houses. The mining company went under and the town vanished. It lasted from 1896 to about 1926. From 1909 to 1913 it had a post office here.

=== Cemeteries ===
The township contains these four cemeteries: Ellisville, Heartley, Landon and Pleasant Hill.

=== Major highways ===
- Illinois Route 116

=== Landmarks ===
- Mount Pisgah Park, a 40-acre tract located southeast of Ellisville, IL, was owned by Fulton County until September, 2009, when it was sold at public auction. Now known as "Mount Pisgah...a peaceful place", the new owner is maintaining the property as a private campground and recreational site.

== Demographics ==
As of the 2020 census there were 135 people, 55 households, and 37 families residing in the township. The population density was 9.70 inhabitants per square mile (3.75/km^{2}). There were 62 housing units at an average density of 4.46 per square mile (1.72/km^{2}). The racial makeup of the township was 98.52% White, 0.00% African American, 0.74% Native American, 0.00% Asian, 0.00% Pacific Islander, 0.00% from other races, and 0.74% from two or more races. Hispanic or Latino of any race were 2.22% of the population.

There were 55 households, out of which 5.50% had children under the age of 18 living with them, 47.27% were married couples living together, 20.00% had a female householder with no spouse present, and 32.73% were non-families. 32.70% of all households were made up of individuals, and 27.30% had someone living alone who was 65 years of age or older. The average household size was 2.11 and the average family size was 2.51.

The township's age distribution consisted of 5.2% under the age of 18, 7.8% from 18 to 24, 14.6% from 25 to 44, 28.4% from 45 to 64, and 44.0% who were 65 years of age or older. The median age was 63.5 years. For every 100 females, there were 75.8 males. For every 100 females age 18 and over, there were 74.6 males.

The median income for a household in the township was $39,583, and the median income for a family was $43,661. Males had a median income of $26,250 versus $26,667 for females. The per capita income for the township was $30,158. No families and 13.8% of the population were below the poverty line, including none of those under age 18 and 17.6% of those age 65 or over.

Historical population
Census	Pop.	Note	%±
2000	177		—
2010	155		−12.4%
2020	135		−12.9%
U.S. Decennial Census

== School districts ==
- Avon Community Unit School District 176
- Spoon River Valley Community Unit School District 4

== Political districts ==
- Illinois' 17th congressional district
- State House District 94
- State Senate District 47
