= Maquon, Illinois =

American village

- Village
- Location of Maquon in Knox County, Illinois
- Coordinates: 40°47′53″N 90°09′47″W
- Country: United States
- State: Illinois
- County: Knox
- Townships: Maquon, Haw Creek
- Founded: 1837
- Renamed: 1858 to Maquon
- Founder: Pernach Owen and Elisha Thurman

Government
  - Village President: Mark Thomas

Area
  - Total: 0.16 sq mi (0.42 km^{2})
  - Land: 0.16 sq mi (0.42 km^{2})
  - Water: 0 sq mi (0.00 km^{2})
- Elevation: 623 ft (190 m)

Population (2020)
  - Total: 218
  - Density: 1,344.7/sq mi (519.19/km^{2})
- Time zone: UTC-6 (CST)
  - Summer (DST): UTC-5 (CDT)
- ZIP code: 61458
- Area code: 309
- FIPS code: 17-46695
- GNIS feature ID: 2399250
- Website: maquon.org

Maquon is a village in Knox County, Illinois, United States. The population was 218 at the 2020 census. It is part of the Galesburg Micropolitan Statistical Area.

== Etymology ==
According to the 1976 book, "History of Maquon and Vicinity" by Ruth Simkins Swearingen, the name derives from the Potawatomi word "Amaquonsippi", literally meaning "mussel river", i.e. "spoon-shaped-shell river", which was simplified to "Maquon", i.e. "spoon". Nearby Spoon River takes its name from this meaning.

== History ==
The village was platted by Pernach Owen and Elisha Thurman in 1837 under the name Bennington, likely from Bennington, Vermont. In 1858 its name was changed to Maquon.

Oral reports by residents referred to a nineteenth-century battle between the Potawatomi and "white settlers" at Haw Creek Township, northeast from the center of Maquon. The Potawatomi were forced away from Maquon.

== Geography ==
Maquon is located in southern Knox County. Illinois Route 97 passes through the center of the village, leading northwest 16 miles (26 km) to Galesburg, the county seat, and southeast 1.5 miles (2.4 km) to Illinois Route 8.

According to the 2021 census gazetteer files, Maquon has a total area of 0.16 square miles (0.41 km^{2}), all land. The village sits on a low bluff 1 mile (1.6 km) north and west of the Spoon River.

== Demographics ==
Historical population
Census	Pop.	Note	%±
1880	548		—
1890	501		−8.6%
1900	475		−5.2%
1910	472		−0.6%
1920	441		−6.6%
1930	328		−25.6%
1940	429		30.8%
1950	361		−15.9%
1960	386		6.9%
1970	374		−3.1%
1980	350		−6.4%
1990	331		−5.4%
2000	318		−3.9%
2010	284		−10.7%
2020	218		−23.2%
U.S. Decennial Census

As of the 2020 census there were 218 people, 81 households, and 48 families residing in the village. The population density was 1,345.68 inhabitants per square mile (519.57/km^{2}). There were 133 housing units at an average density of 820.99 per square mile (316.99/km^{2}). The racial makeup of the village was 96.33% White, 0.00% African American, 0.00% Native American, 0.00% Asian, 0.00% Pacific Islander, 0.00% from other races, and 3.67% from two or more races. Hispanic or Latino of any race were 0.92% of the population.

There were 81 households, out of which 30.9% had children under the age of 18 living with them, 46.91% were married couples living together, 6.17% had a female householder with no husband present, and 40.74% were non-families. 35.80% of all households were made up of individuals, and 20.99% had someone living alone who was 65 years of age or older. The average household size was 2.92 and the average family size was 2.23.

The village's age distribution consisted of 24.9% under the age of 18, 3.9% from 18 to 24, 20.9% from 25 to 44, 30.4% from 45 to 64, and 19.9% who were 65 years of age or older. The median age was 45.1 years. For every 100 females, there were 123.5 males. For every 100 females age 18 and over, there were 109.2 males.

The median income for a household in the village was $48,250, and the median income for a family was $51,250. Males had a median income of $38,750 versus $27,917 for females. The per capita income for the village was $22,554. About 22.9% of families and 31.3% of the population were below the poverty line, including 53.5% of those under age 18 and 30.6% of those age 65 or over.

== School districts ==
It is in the Spoon River Valley Community Unit School District 4. The district's comprehensive high school is Spoon River Valley High School.
