= Bushnell-Prairie City High School =

Public high school in Bushnell, Illinois, US

Coordinates: 40°33′33″N 90°30′50″W

- Bushnell-Prairie City High School Logo

Location
- 845 North Walnut Street; Bushnell, McDonough County, Illinois 61422; United States

Information
- Type: Comprehensive Public High School
- School district: Bushnell-Prairie City Community Unit School District 170
- Principal: Jerry Butcher
- Teaching staff: 25.55 (on an FTE basis)
- Grades: 9–12
- Enrollment: 175 (2023–2024)
- Student to teacher ratio: 7.76
- Campus type: Small city
- Colors: Red, White, Blue
- Athletics conference: Prairieland
- Mascot: Spartans
- PSAE average: 45
- Feeder schools: Bushnell-Prairie City Junior High School
- Website: bpcschools.org/54166_3

Bushnell-Prairie City High School (BPCHS) is a public four-year high school located at 845 North Walnut Street in Bushnell, Illinois, a small city in McDonough County, Illinois, in the Midwestern United States. BPCHS is part of Bushnell-Prairie City Community Unit School District 170, which serves the communities of Bushnell and Prairie City, and also includes Bushnell-Prairie City Junior High School and Bushnell-Prairie City Elementary School. The campus is located 14 miles northeast of Macomb, Illinois, and serves a mixed small city, village, and rural residential community. The school lies within the Macomb micropolitan statistical area.

== Academics ==
In 2009 Bushnell-Prairie City High School did not make Adequate Yearly Progress, with 45% of students meeting standards, on the Prairie State Achievement Examination, a state test that is part of the No Child Left Behind Act. The school's average high school graduation rate between 1999 and 2009 was 84%.

BPCHS offers courses in the following academic areas:

- Agriculture
- Business
- Carl Sandburg College Dual Credit
- District Service
- Drivers Education
- Health
- English
- Family and Consumer Science
- Industrial Technology
- Math
- Music
- Physical Education
- Science
- Social Studies
- Spanish
- Western Area Career System

== Athletics and activities ==
Bushnell-Prairie City High School competes in the Prairieland Conference and is a member school in the Illinois High School Association. Their name and mascot are the Spartans. The school has no state championships on record in team athletics and activities.

=== Athletics ===
Sports offered at BPCHS include:

==== Boys ====
- Baseball
- Basketball
- Cross country
- Football
- Track & Field

==== Girls ====
- Basketball
- Cross country
- Softball
- Track & Field
- Volleyball

=== Activities ===
Clubs and other activities offered at BPCHS include:

- Band
- B-PC Printing Company
- Cheerleading
- Chorus
- District service
- Flag squad
- Future Farmers of America (FFA)
- Industrial arts
- Interact
- Scholastic bowl
- Student council
- Tech Prep
- Tutoring
- Varsity clubs
- Yearbook
- Spanish Club

== History ==
Bushnell-Prairie City High School was formed in 1952 from the consolidation of Bushnell's and Prairie City's high schools. The history of Bushnell-Prairie City High School is also the history of these original component schools.

=== Bushnell High School ===
It is not known when the school system in Bushnell was started. A consolidation effort between the towns of Bushnell and Prairie City took place in the early 1950s. The effort was realized in 1952. A new school was developed and is now called Bushnell-Prairie City High School. BPCHS built a new building on the grounds where the original building once stood. Bushnell High School's mascot was the Braves, and the school's colors were blue and purple.

=== Prairie City High School ===
The first school building in Prairie City was established in 1855, just one year after the town was platted. The town's growth was remarkable, reaching a population of 1,500 by 1860. By 1875 that number had settled to about 800. A learning "Academy" was established in 1857 for the Prairie City kids by a local church and was supported by the town's people. This idea soon went by the wayside and the school building was used for public school purposes. A high school curriculum was established in Prairie City by the late 19th century. Prairie City High School served the community for about six decades. It was at some point in the early 1950s that the communities of Bushnell and Prairie City decided to pool their educational resources. This effort was realized in 1952. It was then that Prairie City High School closed and the Bushnell-Prairie City School District was opened.

Even though the High School classes were relocated to Bushnell as a result of the Bushnell-Prairie City (B-PC) consolidation, the school remained as the Prairie City Elementary School grades 1 through 8 until 1962. Grades 7 and 8 then relocated to the B-PC Jr. High School (the former Bushnell High School bldg. in Bushnell). Grades 1 through 6 remained until the early 1970s.

The original Prairie City High School building has been torn down. Prairie City High School's mascot was the Cobras, and its colors were blue and white.

=== Future consolidation talks ===
Beginning in late 2008 the Bushnell-Prairie City School District began discussing reorganization or consolidation with neighboring school districts. In the summer of 2009 a feasibility study was commissioned to investigate the possibilities of consolidation with neighboring Avon and Abingdon school districts. The results of the study were released in January 2010. The recommendations of the study included: consolidation of all three districts into one unit district, placement of the combined high school in the current Bushnell-Prairie City High/Middle School buildings, placement of the combined middle school in the current Abingdon High/Middle School, and keeping the current elementary buildings in place.
