= Astoria High School (Illinois) =

Coordinates: 40.2298°N 90.3523°W

Location
- 402 North Jefferson Street; Astoria, Illinois 61501; United States

Information
- Type: Comprehensive Public High School
- School district: Astoria Community Unit School District 1
- Principal: Don Willet
- Staff: 11.63 (FTE)
- Grades: 9–12
- Enrollment: 80 (2023–2024)
- Student to teacher ratio: 6.88
- Campus type: Rural, village
- Colors: Purple, Green
- Athletics conference: Prairieland
- Mascot: Rebels
- PSAE average: 35%
- Website: acusd1.org}

Astoria High School, or AHS, is a public four-year high school located at 402 North Jefferson Street in Astoria, Illinois, a village in Fulton County, Illinois, in the American Midwest. AHS is part of Astoria Community Unit School District 1, which serves the community of Astoria, and includes grades kindergarten through twelfth grade in one building. The campus is located 30 miles southwest of Canton, Illinois, and serves a mixed village and rural residential community. The school lies within the Canton micropolitan statistical area.

== Academics ==
In 2009 Astoria High School did not make Adequate Yearly Progress, with 35% of students meeting standards, on the Prairie State Achievement Examination, a state test that is part of the No Child Left Behind Act. The school's average high school graduation rate between 1999 and 2009 was 93%.

== Athletics ==
Astoria High School competes in the Prairieland Conference and is a member school in the Illinois High School Association. It coops with neighboring VIT High School for most athletics. Their combined name and mascot is the South Fulton Rebels. The school has no state championships on record in team athletics and activities.

== History ==
The Astoria School District (pre-k through 12th grade) is housed in one building. Astoria built the present high school in the early fifties and built an addition to house the Junior High and Elementary in the early 1970s. Due to a builder's strike during construction, many aesthetic and basic design features were omitted. Since that time such amenities as floor tile, paint, carpet, and electrical outlets have been added. Astoria schools were awarded a Technology Grant for Economically Challenged Schools which allowed the district to inform the community and involve community members in academic planning. The school purchased new computers and software, as well as wired the building and started training the staff in computer skills. The award of Technology Integration Funds two years later continues the trend of improving the school's technology base.
