= Havana High School =

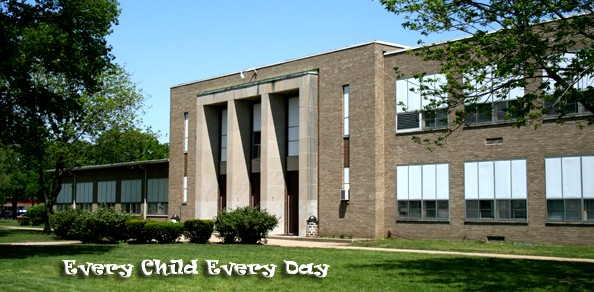
- Havana High School Building

Location
- 501 South McKinley Street; Havana, Mason County, Illinois 62644; USA
- Coordinates: 40.296221°N 90.05472°W

Information
- Type: Comprehensive Public High School
- Motto: "Every Child Every Day"
- School district: Havana Community Unit School District 126
- Principal: David McKinney
- Teaching staff: 21.50 (FTE)
- Grades: 9–12
- Enrollment: 262 (2022–2023)
- Student to teacher ratio: 12.19
- Campus type: Rural, fringe
- Colors: Maroon, White
- Athletics conference: Prairieland
- Mascot: Ducks
- PSAE average: 39%
- Feeder schools: Havana Junior High School
- Website: Havana High School Website

Havana High School, or HHS, is a public four-year high school located at 501 South McKinley Street in Havana, Illinois, a small town in Mason County, in the Midwestern United States. HHS is part of Havana Community Unit School District 126, which serves the communities of Bath, Havana, Kilbourne, and Topeka. The campus lies 45 miles southwest of Peoria, 45 miles northwest of Springfield, and serves a mixed small city, village, and rural residential community.

== Academics ==
In 2009, Havana High School did not make Adequate Yearly Progress, with 39% of students meeting standards, on the Prairie State Achievement Examination, a state test that is part of the No Child Left Behind Act. The school's average high school graduation rate between 1999 and 2009 was 82%.

== Athletics and activities ==
Havana High School competes in the Prairieland Conference and is a member school of the Illinois High School Association. The HHS mascot is the Ducks, with school colors of maroon and white. The school has one state championships on record in team athletics and activities, Boys Golf in 1998–1999.

The school offers competitive athletics opportunities in the following sports:

- Boys Baseball
- Boys and Girls Basketball
- Boys and Girls Cross Country
- Boys Football
- Boys Golf
- Girls Softball
- Boys and Girls Track & Field
- Girls Volleyball
- Boys Wrestling (coop with Mason City High School)

The school offers the activities in the following areas:

- Band
- Chorus
- Future Farmers of America (FFA)
- Scholastic Bowl
- Spirit
- Student Council
- Yearbook
- Spanish Club
- Science Club
- Science Olympiad
- FCCLA

== History ==
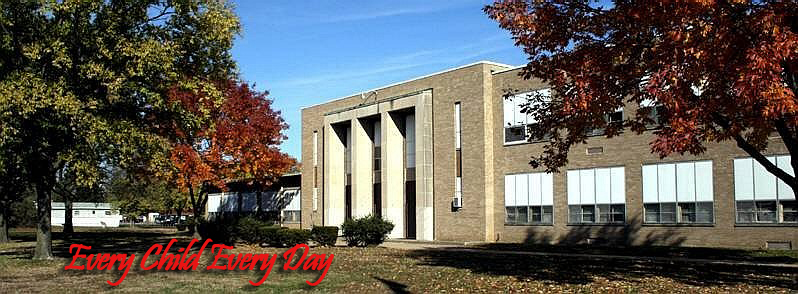
Havana High School Building in Autumn

Sources of material include:.
