= Lewistown High School (Illinois) =

Location
- 15205 North IL Route 100; Lewistown, Fulton County, Illinois 61542; USA; 40.40993°N 90.1543°W

Information
- Type: Comprehensive Public High School
- School district: Lewistown Community Unit School District 97
- Principal: Clay Ginglen
- Teaching staff: 23.07 (FTE)
- Grades: 7–12
- Enrollment: 268 (2023–2024)
- Student to teacher ratio: 11.62
- Colors: Scarlet Red, Columbia Blue
- Athletics conference: Prairieland
- Mascot: Indians
- PSAE average: 57%
- Yearbook: Legend
- Website: Lewistown High School Website

Lewistown High School, or LHS, is a public four-year high school located at 15205 North IL Route 100 in Lewistown, Illinois, a small city in Fulton County, in the Midwestern United States. LHS is part of Lewistown Community Unit School District 97, which serves the communities of Bryant, Lewistown, Little America, and St. David. The campus 13 miles southwest of Canton, and serves a mixed small city, village, and rural residential community. The school districts lies within the Canton micropolitan statistical area.

== Academics ==
In 2009 Lewistown High School did not make Adequate Yearly Progress, with 57% of students meeting standards, on the Prairie State Achievement Examination, a state test that is part of the No Child Left Behind Act. The school's average high school graduation rate between 1999–2009 was 86%.

== Athletics and activities ==
Lewistown High School competes in the Prairieland Conference and is a member school of the Illinois High School Association. The LHS mascot is the Indians with colors of scarlet red and Columbia blue. The school has one state championships on record in team athletics and activities, Boys Baseball in 1992–1993.

The school offers competitive athletics opportunities in the following sports:

- Boys Baseball
- Boys and Girls Basketball
- Girls Cheerleading
- Boys and Girls Cross Country
- Girls Dance Team
- Boys Football
- Girls Softball
- Boys and Girls Track & Field
- Girls Volleyball

The school offers the activities in the following areas:

- Marching Band
- Chorus
- FCCLA
- Future Farmers of America (FFA)
- Legend
- National Honor Society
- Scholastic Bowl
- Science Olympiad
- Spanish Club
- Spanish National Honor Society
- Speech
- Student Senate
- Tube band
- Web Design

== History ==
One source of potential material includes:.
