= Bushnell, Illinois =

- City
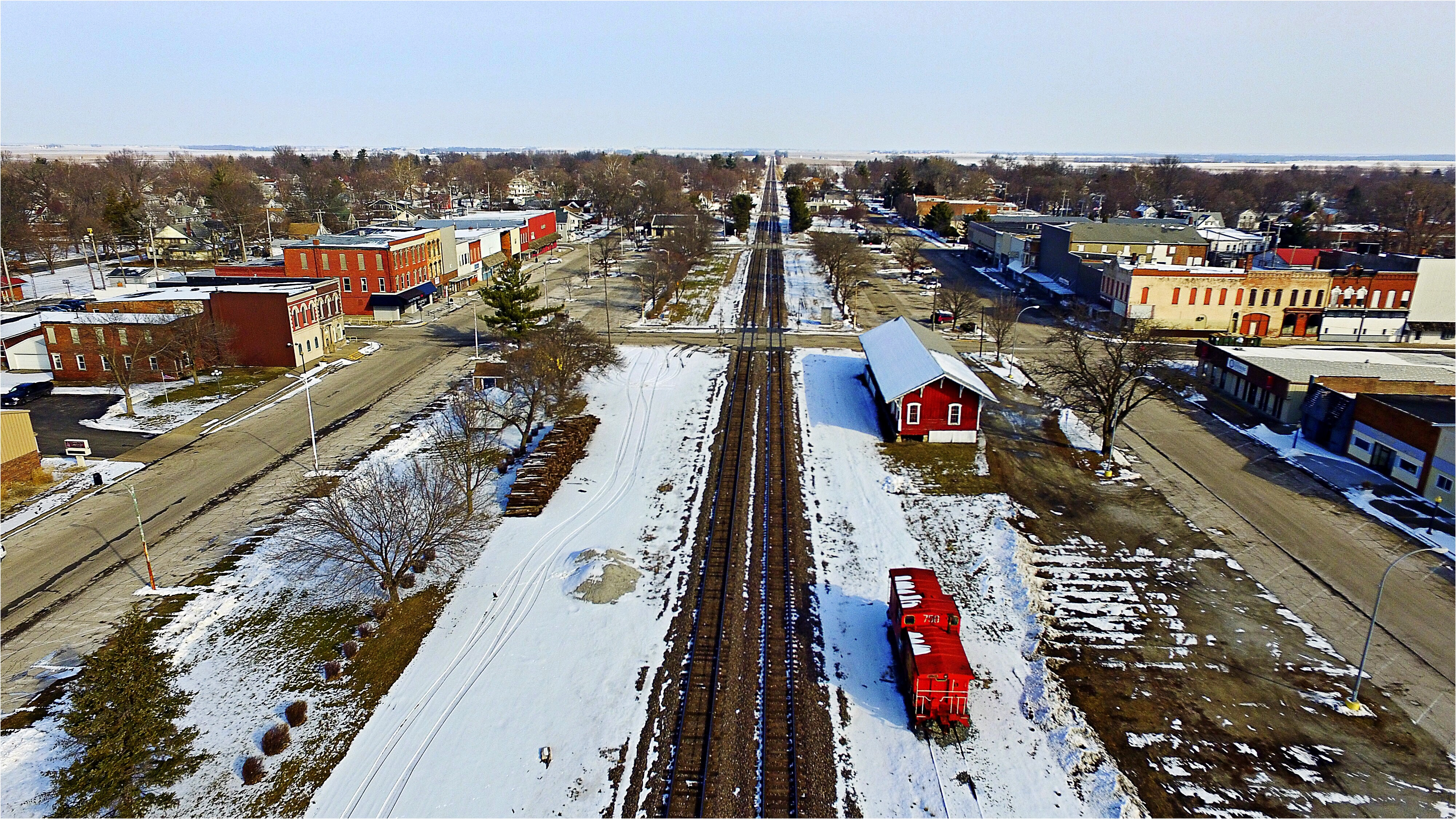
- The heart of rural Bushnell, bisected by two active railroad lines, one being Amtrak
- Motto: "Agricultura et industria"
- Location in McDonough County, Illinois
- Coordinates: 40°33′04″N 90°29′47″W
- Country: United States
- State: Illinois
- County: McDonough
- Township: Bushnell

Area
  - Total: 2.12 sq mi (5.50 km^{2})
  - Land: 2.12 sq mi (5.48 km^{2})
  - Water: 0.0077 sq mi (0.02 km^{2})
- Elevation: 643 ft (196 m)

Population (2020)
  - Total: 2,718
  - Density: 1,283.6/sq mi (495.62/km^{2})
- Time zone: UTC-6 (CST)
  - Summer (DST): UTC-5 (CDT)
- ZIP Code: 61422
- Area code: 309
- FIPS code: 17-10110
- GNIS ID: 2393478
- Website: bushnell.illinois.gov

Bushnell is a city in McDonough County, Illinois, United States. The population was 2,718 at the 2020 census, down from 3,117 in 2010.

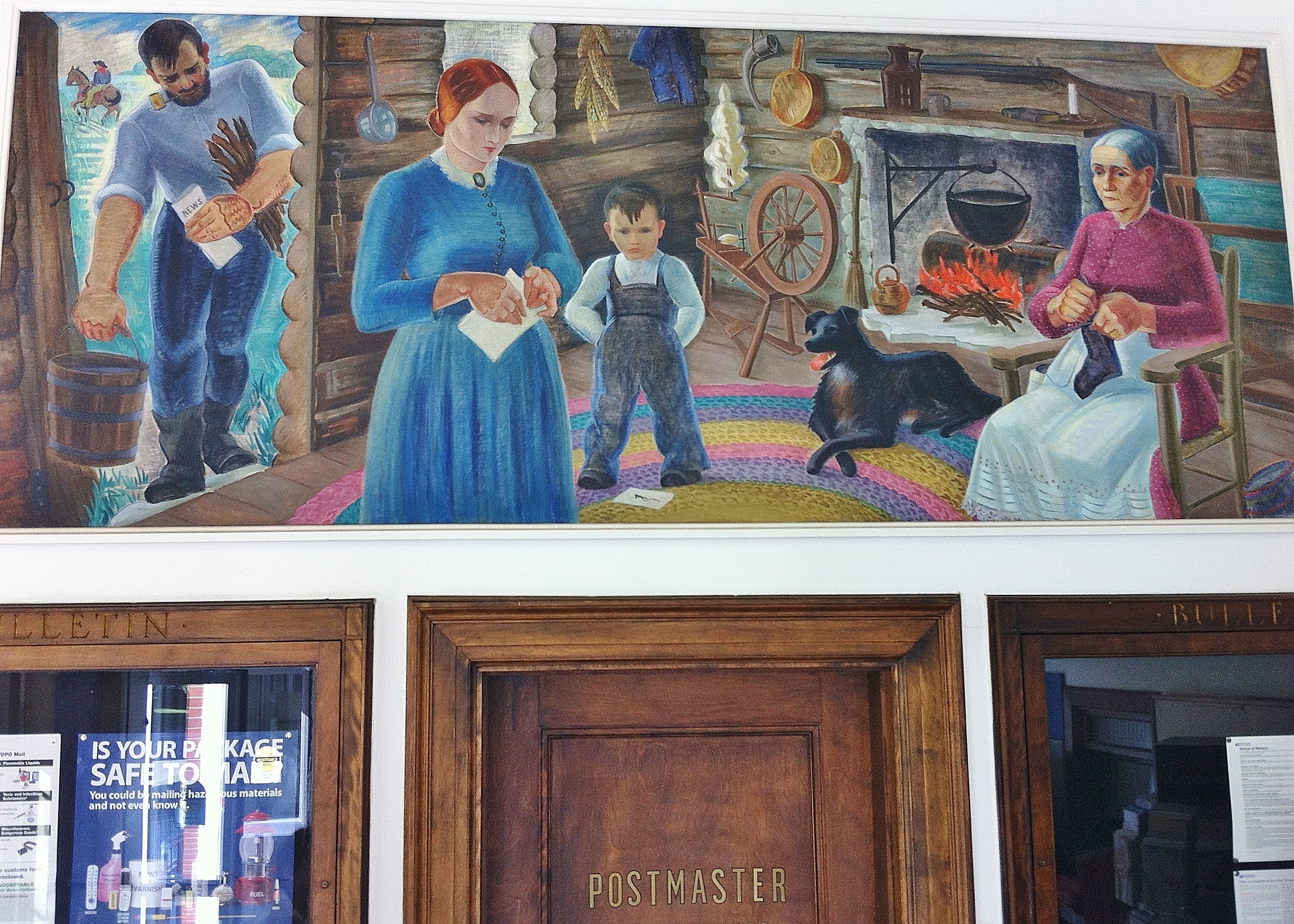
An oil on canvas mural, "Pioneer Home in Bushnell" by Reva Jackman is on display in the Bushnell Post Office

== History ==
The town was founded in 1854 when the Northern Cross Railroad built a line through the area. Nehemiah Bushnell was the president of the railroad, and townspeople honored him by naming their community after him. The railroad later became part of the Chicago, Burlington and Quincy Railroad, which continues to operate through Bushnell under the name Burlington Northern Santa Fe. Bushnell was also served by the Toledo, Peoria and Western Railway, now the Keokuk Junction Railway. Amtrak trains pass through the city but do not stop.

The Nagel Brothers of Bushnell were the first to invent a process of making rolled oats without having to steam the oats. Up until this time, the oats were first steamed to separate the groat from the hull. The patent for this new process was later sold to the Quaker Oats Company.

Bushnell is home to a Vaughan & Bushnell hammer factory.

== Geography ==
Bushnell is located in northeastern McDonough County. Illinois state routes 9 and 41 pass through the city center as Cole Street. Route 9 goes west out of the city on Charles Street, leading 19 miles (31 km) to Blandinsville, while to the east it leads 27 miles (43 km) to Canton. Route 41 leads north 31 miles (50 km) to Galesburg and south 7 miles (11 km) to its terminus at U.S. Route 136. Macomb, the McDonough county seat, is 14 miles (23 km) southwest of Bushnell.

According to the U.S. Census Bureau, Bushnell has a total area of 2.13 square miles (5.52 km^{2}), of which 0.01 square miles (0.03 km^{2}), or 0.38%, are water. The west side of the city drains to a south-flowing tributary of the East Fork of the La Moine River, while the east side drains to Shaw Creek, a southeast-flowing tributary of the Spoon River. The city is part of the Illinois River watershed.

== Demographics ==
Historical population
Census	Pop.	Note	%±
1870	2,003		—
1880	2,316		15.6%
1890	2,314		−0.1%
1900	2,490		7.6%
1910	2,619		5.2%
1920	2,716		3.7%
1930	2,850		4.9%
1940	2,906		2.0%
1950	3,317		14.1%
1960	3,710		11.8%
1970	3,703		−0.2%
1980	3,811		2.9%
1990	3,288		−13.7%
2000	3,221		−2.0%
2010	3,117		−3.2%
2020	2,718		−12.8%
U.S. Decennial Census

=== 2020 census ===
As of the 2020 census, Bushnell had a population of 2,718. The median age was 43.5 years. 20.9% of residents were under the age of 18 and 21.9% of residents were 65 years of age or older. For every 100 females there were 95.3 males, and for every 100 females age 18 and over there were 93.6 males age 18 and over.

0.0% of residents lived in urban areas, while 100.0% lived in rural areas.

There were 1,201 households in Bushnell, of which 24.3% had children under the age of 18 living in them. Of all households, 42.5% were married-couple households, 20.9% were households with a male householder and no spouse or partner present, and 27.8% were households with a female householder and no spouse or partner present. About 34.9% of all households were made up of individuals and 16.7% had someone living alone who was 65 years of age or older.

There were 1,386 housing units, of which 13.3% were vacant. The homeowner vacancy rate was 2.6% and the rental vacancy rate was 10.7%.

Racial composition as of the 2020 census
Race	Number	Percent
White	2,543	93.6%
Black or African American	31	1.1%
American Indian and Alaska Native	1	0.0%
Asian	2	0.1%
Native Hawaiian and Other Pacific Islander	1	0.0%
Some other race	13	0.5%
Two or more races	127	4.7%
Hispanic or Latino (of any race)	38	1.4%

=== 2000 census ===
As of the census of 2000, there were 3,221 people, 1,323 households, and 889 families residing in Bushnell. The population density was 1,573.9 inhabitants per square mile (607.7/km^{2}). There were 1,446 housing units at an average density of 706.6 per square mile (272.8/km^{2}). The racial makeup of the city was 98.79% White, 0.12% African American, 0.19% Native American, 0.09% Asian, 0.43% from other races, and 0.37% from two or more races. Hispanic or Latino of any race were 0.68% of the population.

There were 1,323 households, out of which 29.8% had children under the age of 18 living with them, 52.9% were married couples living together, 10.0% had a female householder with no husband present, and 32.8% were non-families. 27.7% of all households were made up of individuals, and 15.3% had someone living alone who was 65 years of age or older. The average household size was 2.43 and the average family size was 2.94.

In the city, the population was spread out, with 24.9% under the age of 18, 9.0% from 18 to 24, 26.4% from 25 to 44, 22.0% from 45 to 64, and 17.8% who were 65 years of age or older. The median age was 37 years. For every 100 females, there were 93.1 males. For every 100 females age 18 and over, there were 91.8 males.

The median income for a household in the town was $30,482, and the median income for a family was $38,450. Males had a median income of $27,266 versus $18,583 for females. The per capita income for the city was $17,263. About 12.2% of families and 17.0% of the population were below the poverty line, including 29.3% of those under age 18 and 6.5% of those age 65 or over.

== Horse show ==
Beginning in 1908, the Truman Pioneer Stud Farm in Bushnell was home to one of the largest horse shows in the Midwest. The show was well known for imported European horses. The Bushnell Horse Show returned in 2004 and has become one of the better draft horse hitch shows in the tri-state region. The Bushnell Horse Show features some of the best Belgian and Percheron hitches in the country. Teams have come from many different states and Canada to compete.

== Music ==
From 1991 to 2012, Bushnell was home to one of the largest Christian music and arts festivals in the world, known as the Cornerstone Festival. Each year around the 4th of July, 25,000 people from all over the world would descend on the small farm town to watch over 300 bands, authors and artists perform at the Cornerstone Farm Campgrounds. The festival was generally well received by locals, and businesses in the area would typically put up signs welcoming festival-goers to their town. Cornerstone held its final festival in 2012 and no longer operates.

== Education ==
Bushnell is home to the Bushnell-Prairie City Community Unit School District 170. Students attend Bushnell-Prairie City Elementary School, Bushnell-Prairie City Junior High School, and Bushnell-Prairie City High School which are all located in Bushnell.

== Notable people ==
- Seibert Q. Duntley (1911–1999), physicist and president of the Optical Society of America
- Charles Kuhn (1892–1989), cartoonist
- E. C. Mills (1873–1962), educator
- Earl Sheely (1893–1952), 1920s first baseman for Chicago White Sox
