= Poverty Ridge, Illinois =

- Unincorporated community
- Location within Illinois Location within the United States
- Coordinates: 40°27′43″N 90°20′27″W
- Country: United States
- State: Illinois
- County: Fulton
- Elevation: 663 ft (202 m)
- Time zone: UTC-6 (Central (CST))
  - Summer (DST): UTC-5 (CDT)
- Area code: 309
- GNIS feature ID: 1802240

Poverty Ridge is an unincorporated community in Fulton County, Illinois, United States, about eleven miles northwest of Lewistown. Its elevation is 633 feet (202 m), and it is located at 40°27′43″N 90°20′27″W (40.4619856, -90.3409579). The community is named for a line of hills near Seville, which likewise is named Poverty Ridge.
