= Rapatee, Illinois =

- Unincorporated community
- Location within Illinois Location within the United States
- Coordinates: 40°42′54″N 90°09′29″W
- Country: United States
- State: Illinois
- County: Knox
- Township: Maquon
- Elevation: 696 ft (212 m)
- Time zone: UTC-6 (Central (CST))
  - Summer (DST): UTC-5 (CDT)
- Area code: 309
- GNIS feature ID: 416393

Rapatee is an unincorporated community in Maquon Township, Knox County, Illinois, United States. Rapatee is located on Illinois Route 97, 5.7 miles (9.2 km) east of London Mills.
