= Cuba High School (Illinois) =

Public high school in Illinois, United States

Location
- 20325 North IL State Route 97; Cuba, Fulton County, Illinois 61427; United States
- Coordinates: 40°29′37″N 90°11′24″W

Information
- Other name: North Fulton High School
- Type: Comprehensive Public High School
- School district: Cuba Community Unit School District 3
- NCES School ID: 171140001370
- Principal: Jeff Braun
- Teaching staff: 12.55 (on an FTE basis)
- Grades: 9–12
- Enrollment: 123 (2023–2024)
- Student to teacher ratio: 9.80
- Campus type: Rural: Distant
- Colors: Red, Black
- Athletics conference: Prairieland
- Mascot: Wildcats
- Feeder schools: Cuba Middle School
- Website: www.cusd3.net/o/cusd-3-fulton-county/page/cuba-middle-high-school--2

Cuba High School, also known as Cuba Senior High School, or CHS, and more recently as North Fulton High School, is a public four-year high school located at 20325 North IL Route 97, south of Cuba, Illinois, a small city in Fulton County, in the Midwestern United States, at the intersection of Illinois Routes 95 and 97. CHS is part of Cuba Community Unit School District 3, which serves the communities of Cuba, Fiatt, Marietta, and Smithfield, and includes Cuba Middle School, and Cuba Elementary School. The campus is located 9 miles southwest of Canton, and serves a mixed small city, village, and rural residential community. The school districts lies within the Canton micropolitan statistical area.

== Enrollment ==
Cuba High School is a small school with an enrollment at 132 students, as of 2019, that commute daily from the neighboring villages and rural areas.

== Academics ==
The school's average high school graduation rate between 2015 and 2019 was 78%. 93% of the grade 9 students in 2019 were on track to graduate, and 53% of the students enroll in college after graduation.

== Athletics ==
Cuba High School competes in the Prairieland Conference and is a member school of the Illinois High School Association. The CHS mascot is the Wildcats with colors of red and black; however, they co-op with neighboring Spoon River Valley High School for most athletics. Their combined name and mascot is the North Fulton Wildcats, with colors of red and black. The school has no state championships on record in team athletics and activities. The varsity football team, the North Fulton Wildcats, qualified for state tournament most recently in 2017, and reached the semi-finals in 2007. The 2009 Wildcat baseball team, led by twin brothers Josh and Jeremy Ellsworth, finished with an overall record of 27 wins and 4 losses, earning third place in the IHSA state tournament.

== History ==
Smithfield High School consolidated into Cuba High School in the 1940s. The former Smithfield High School building then served as a grade school for the Cuba district until 1990. After 1990, the village of Smithfield then assumed control of the building and used it as a community center and private art gallery.
