= Maquon Township, Knox County, Illinois =

Maquon Township
- Township
- Location in Knox County

- Knox County's location in Illinois
- Coordinates: 40°45′09″N 90°08′52″W
- Country: United States
- State: Illinois
- County: Knox
- Established: November 2, 1852

Government
  - Road Commissioner: Brandon Gray

Area
  - Total: 36.10 sq mi (93.5 km^{2})
  - Land: 35.88 sq mi (92.9 km^{2})
  - Water: 0.22 sq mi (0.57 km^{2}) 0.60%
- Elevation: 610 ft (186 m)

Population (2020)
  - Total: 446
  - Density: 12.4/sq mi (4.80/km^{2})
- Time zone: UTC-6 (CST)
  - Summer (DST): UTC-5 (CDT)
- ZIP codes: 61436, 61458, 61531
- FIPS code: 17-095-46708

Maquon Township is one of twenty-one Knox County, Illinois, USA townships. As of the 2020 census, its population was 446 and contained 260 housing units.

== Geography ==
According to the 2021 census gazetteer files, Maquon Township has a total area of 36.10 square miles (93.50 km^{2}), of which 35.88 square miles (92.93 km^{2}) (or 99.40%) is land and 0.22 square miles (0.57 km^{2}) (or 0.60%) is water.

- Maquon (vast majority)

=== Unincorporated towns ===
- Rapatee at 40.715039°N 90.158176°W

(This list is based on USGS data and may include former settlements.)

=== Cemeteries ===
The township contains these three cemeteries: Housh, Ouderkirk and Thurman.

== Demographics ==
As of the 2020 census there were 446 people, 184 households, and 130 families residing in the township. The population density was 12.36 inhabitants per square mile (4.77/km^{2}). There were 260 housing units at an average density of 7.20 per square mile (2.78/km^{2}). The racial makeup of the township was 95.29% White, 0.22% African American, 0.00% Native American, 0.00% Asian, 0.00% Pacific Islander, 0.22% from other races, and 4.26% from two or more races. Hispanic or Latino of any race were 2.24% of the population.

There were 184 households, out of which 23.40% had children under the age of 18 living with them, 58.70% were married couples living together, 2.72% had a female householder with no spouse present, and 29.35% were non-families. 27.70% of all households were made up of individuals, and 14.70% had someone living alone who was 65 years of age or older. The average household size was 2.28 and the average family size was 2.73.

The township's age distribution consisted of 19.8% under the age of 18, 5.5% from 18 to 24, 12.1% from 25 to 44, 30.7% from 45 to 64, and 31.9% who were 65 years of age or older. The median age was 55.0 years. For every 100 females, there were 119.9 males. For every 100 females age 18 and over, there were 116.0 males.

The median income for a household in the township was $60,000, and the median income for a family was $66,389. Males had a median income of $43,125 versus $30,833 for females. The per capita income for the township was $28,910. About 11.5% of families and 15.6% of the population were below the poverty line, including 28.4% of those under age 18 and 14.9% of those age 65 or over.

Historical population
Census	Pop.	Note	%±
2010	556		—
2020	446		−19.8%
U.S. Decennial Census

== School districts ==
- Farmington Central Community Unit School District 265
- Knoxville Community Unit School District 202
- Spoon River Valley Community Unit School District 4

== Political districts ==
- Illinois's 18th congressional district
- State House District 74
- State Senate District 37
