= Bernadotte Bridge =

- U.S. National Register of Historic Places
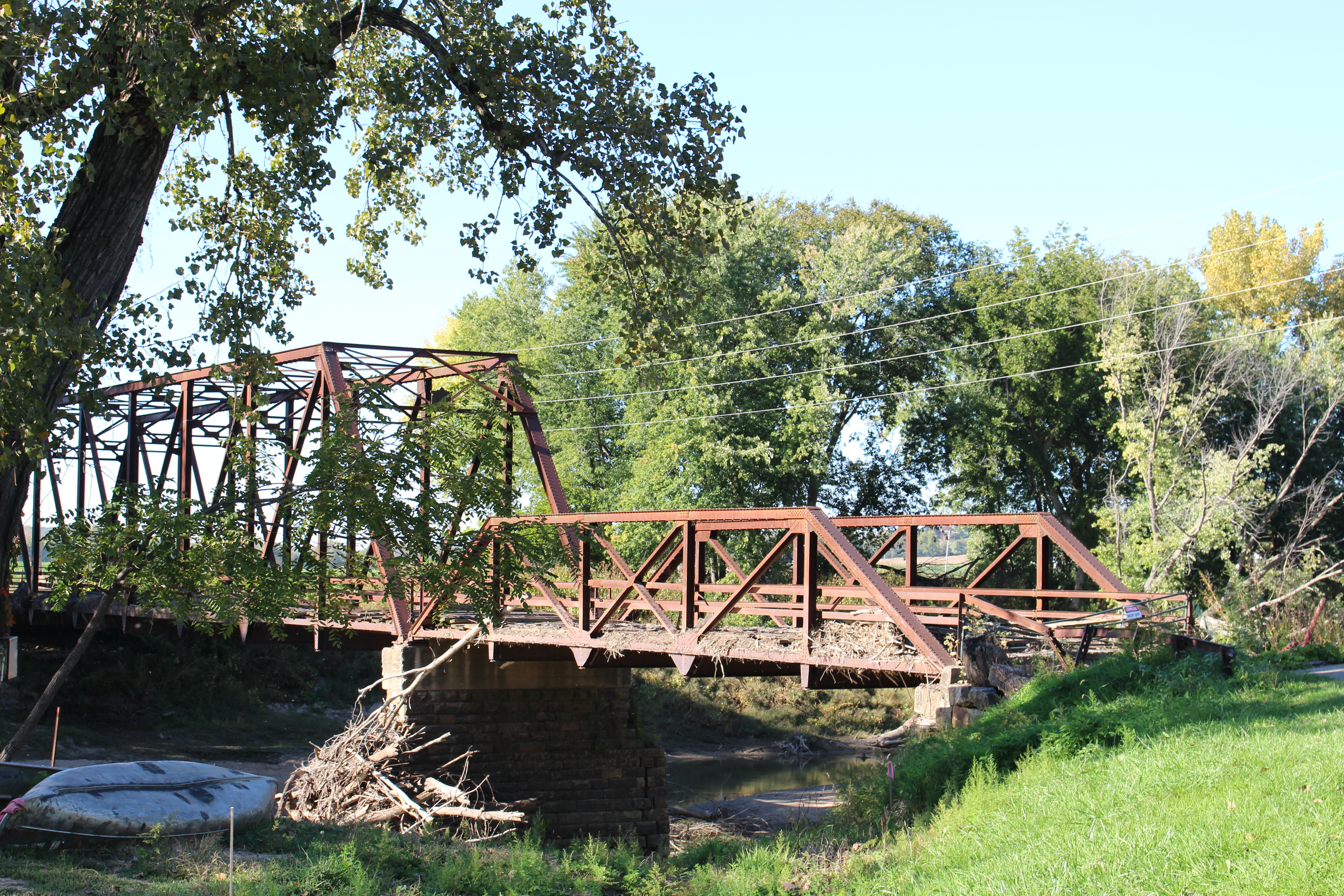

- Location within Illinois Location within the United States
- Location: Bernadotte, Fulton County, Illinois, USA
- Coordinates: 40°24′13″N 90°19′15″W
- Area: less than one acre
- Built: 1910
- Built by: Central States Bridge Co.
- Architectural style: Pratt
- MPS: Metal Highway Bridges of Fulton County TR
- NRHP reference No.: 80001360
- Added to NRHP: October 29, 1980

The Bernadotte Bridge at Bernadotte, built in 1910, is one of nine metal highway bridges in Fulton County, Illinois listed on the National Register of Historic Places. The bridge is located along County Route 2 between Smithfield, Illinois to the north, and Ipava, Illinois to the south. It was added to the National Register of Historic Places on October 29, 1980, along with the eight other bridges, as one of the "Metal Highway Bridges of Fulton County". The bridge is one of three near Smithfield listed on the Register, the others are the Buckeye Bridge (now demolished) and the Tartar's Ferry Bridge. A fourth bridge near the Smithfield was included on the Register but removed in 1996, following its 1995 destruction.

Bernadotte Bridge is one of the few remaining bridges in this Multiple Property Submission group still standing, five of the nine having been destroyed. In late 2010 part of the bridge collapsed due to flooding. In late 2014, the residue was cleaned up from the site. It is currently closed due to safety concerns. Fundraising is in place with the hope of restoring the bridge.
