= Ellisville, Illinois =

- Village
- Location of Ellisville in Fulton County, Illinois.

- Location of Illinois in the United States
- Coordinates: 40°37′37″N 90°18′22″W
- Country: United States
- State: Illinois
- County: Fulton
- Township: Ellisville

Area
  - Total: 0.27 sq mi (0.70 km^{2})
  - Land: 0.27 sq mi (0.70 km^{2})
  - Water: 0 sq mi (0.00 km^{2})
- Elevation: 545 ft (166 m)

Population (2020)
  - Total: 87
  - Density: 320.7/sq mi (123.81/km^{2})
- Time zone: UTC-6 (CST)
  - Summer (DST): UTC-5 (CDT)
- ZIP Code(s): 61431
- Area code: 309
- FIPS code: 17-23529
- GNIS ID: 2398810
- Wikimedia Commons: Ellisville, Illinois

Ellisville is a village in Fulton County, Illinois, United States. The population was 87 at the 2020 census.

== History ==
Ellisville is named for its founder, Levi D. Ellis.

== Geography ==
Ellisville is located in northwestern Fulton County on the west side of the Spoon River, a south-flowing tributary of the Illinois River. Ellisville is 19 miles (31 km) northwest of Canton and 15 miles (24 km) northeast of Bushnell.

According to the 2021 census gazetteer files, Ellisville has a total area of 0.27 square miles (0.70 km^{2}), all land.

== Demographics ==
Historical population
Census	Pop.	Note	%±
1880	260		—
1890	255		−1.9%
1900	219		−14.1%
1910	218		−0.5%
1920	244		11.9%
1930	164		−32.8%
1940	216		31.7%
1950	157		−27.3%
1960	140		−10.8%
1970	137		−2.1%
1980	168		22.6%
1990	116		−31.0%
2000	87		−25.0%
2010	96		10.3%
2020	87		−9.4%
U.S. Decennial Census

As of the 2020 census there were 87 people, 40 households, and 31 families residing in the village. The population density was 321.03 inhabitants per square mile (123.95/km^{2}). There were 32 housing units at an average density of 118.08 per square mile (45.59/km^{2}). The racial makeup of the village was 98.85% White, 0.00% African American, 1.15% Native American, 0.00% Asian, 0.00% Pacific Islander, 0.00% from other races, and 0.00% from two or more races. Hispanic or Latino of any race were 0.00% of the population.

There were 40 households, out of which 7.5% had children under the age of 18 living with them, 50.00% were married couples living together, 27.50% had a female householder with no husband present, and 22.50% were non-families. 22.50% of all households were made up of individuals, and 15.00% had someone living alone who was 65 years of age or older. The average household size was 2.65 and the average family size was 2.40.

The village's age distribution consisted of 6.3% under the age of 18, 9.4% from 18 to 24, 17.8% from 25 to 44, 23% from 45 to 64, and 43.8% who were 65 years of age or older. The median age was 56.7 years. For every 100 females, there were 84.6 males. For every 100 females age 18 and over, there were 83.7 males.

The median income for a household in the village was $41,250, and the median income for a family was $43,125. Males had a median income of $7,292 versus $34,375 for females. The per capita income for the village was $32,255. No families and 7.3% of the population were below the poverty line, including none of those under age 18 and none of those age 65 or over.
