= London Mills, Illinois =

- Village
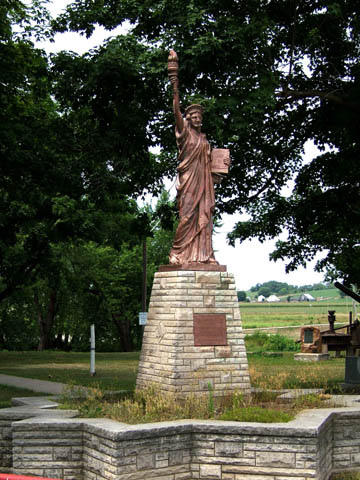
- Lady Liberty of London Mills

- Location of London Mills in Fulton County, Illinois.
- Coordinates: 40°42′38″N 90°15′58″W
- Country: United States
- State: Illinois
- Counties: Fulton, Knox
- Townships: Young Hickory, Chestnut

Area
  - Total: 0.68 sq mi (1.77 km^{2})
  - Land: 0.68 sq mi (1.77 km^{2})
  - Water: 0 sq mi (0.00 km^{2})
- Elevation: 541 ft (165 m)

Population (2020)
  - Total: 350
  - Density: 512/sq mi (197.6/km^{2})
- Time zone: UTC-6 (CST)
  - Summer (DST): UTC-5 (CDT)
- ZIP code: 61544
- Area code: 309
- FIPS code: 17-44446
- GNIS ID: 2398469
- Website: londonmillsil.gov

London Mills is a village in Fulton and Knox counties in the U.S. state of Illinois. The population was 350 at the 2020 census.

The Fulton County portion of London Mills is part of the Canton Micropolitan Statistical Area and the wider Peoria Consolidated Statistical Area, while the Knox County portion is part of the Galesburg Micropolitan Statistical Area.

== Geography ==
London Mills is located along the boundary between Fulton and Knox counties. In the 2000 census, 442 of London Mills' 447 residents (98.9%) lived in Fulton County and 5 (1.2%) lived in Knox County.

The village is bordered to the northwest by the Spoon River, a south-flowing tributary of the Illinois River. Illinois Route 116 forms the southern edge of the village. The highway leads east 14 miles (23 km) to Farmington and west 8 miles (13 km) to St. Augustine. Canton, the largest city in Fulton County, is 22 miles (35 km) to the southeast.

According to the 2010 census, London Mills has a total area of 0.68 square miles (1.76 km^{2}), all land.

== Demographics ==
Historical population
| Census | Pop. | Note | %± |
|---|---|---|---|
| 1890 | 661 | | — |
| 1900 | 528 | | −20.1% |
| 1910 | 555 | | 5.1% |
| 1920 | 546 | | −1.6% |
| 1930 | 432 | | −20.9% |
| 1940 | 579 | | 34.0% |
| 1950 | 581 | | 0.3% |
| 1960 | 617 | | 6.2% |
| 1970 | 610 | | −1.1% |
| 1980 | 587 | | −3.8% |
| 1990 | 485 | | −17.4% |
| 2000 | 447 | | −7.8% |
| 2010 | 392 | | −12.3% |
| 2020 | 350 | | −10.7% |
U.S. Decennial Census

As of the 2020 census, there were 350 people, 152 households, and 98 families residing in the village. The population density was 511.70 inhabitants per square mile (197.57/km^{2}). There were 160 housing units at an average density of 233.92 per square mile (90.32/km^{2}). The racial makeup of the village was 96.00% White, 0.57% African American, 0.29% Native American, 0.00% Asian, 0.00% Pacific Islander, 0.00% from other races, and 3.14% from two or more races. Hispanic or Latino of any race were 1.71% of the population.

There were 152 households, out of which 25.0% had children under the age of 18 living with them, 48.68% were married couples living together, 9.21% had a female householder with no husband present, and 35.53% were non-families. 30.26% of all households were made up of individuals, and 11.18% had someone living alone who was 65 years of age or older. The average household size was 2.56 and the average family size was 2.14.

The village's age distribution consisted of 17.5% under the age of 18, 3.4% from 18 to 24, 27.3% from 25 to 44, 28.2% from 45 to 64, and 23.6% who were 65 years of age or older. The median age was 46.3 years. For every 100 females, there were 100.0 males. For every 100 females age 18 and over, there were 126.1 males.

The median income for a household in the village was $43,750, and the median income for a family was $55,833. Males had a median income of $34,688 versus $16,458 for females. The per capita income for the village was $34,731. About 4.1% of families and 9.2% of the population were below the poverty line, including none of those under age 18 and none of those age 65 or over.

== Education ==
It is in the Spoon River Valley Community Unit School District 4.

The schools include Spoon River Valley High School, Spoon River Valley Junior High School, and Spoon River Valley Elementary School. The facility is located east of town at the intersection of Illinois routes 97 and 116.

== Notable people ==
- Gale Schisler, US congressman (Illinois's 19th congressional district)
