= Smithfield, Illinois =

- Village
- Location of Smithfield in Fulton County, Illinois.

- Location of Illinois in the United States
- Coordinates: 40°28′28″N 90°17′42″W
- Country: United States
- State: Illinois
- County: Fulton
- Township: Cass

Area
  - Total: 0.46 sq mi (1.20 km^{2})
  - Land: 0.46 sq mi (1.20 km^{2})
  - Water: 0 sq mi (0.00 km^{2})
- Elevation: 630 ft (190 m)

Population (2020)
  - Total: 191
  - Density: 411.1/sq mi (158.72/km^{2})
- Time zone: UTC-6 (CST)
  - Summer (DST): UTC-5 (CDT)
- ZIP Code(s): 61477
- Area code: 309
- FIPS code: 17-70226
- GNIS ID: 2399831
- Wikimedia Commons: Smithfield, Illinois

Smithfield is a village in Fulton County, Illinois, United States. The population was 191 at the 2020 census. The village is named in honor of Dr. Joseph N. Smith.

== History ==
Smithfield was founded in 1868.

Much of Smithfield was destroyed by fire in 1900.

Smithfield was once serviced by TP&W (Toledo, Peoria And Western Railway) before sold to KJRY (Keokuk Junction Railway).

Smithfield once had a grocery story, Bank, Hardware Store and Railroad Depot. The Bank is now the Historic Museum as well as the Red Brick School.

The Village once contained a Jail. The old jail cells can be seen in the Red Brick School parking lot.

== Geography ==
Smithfield is located in western Fulton County. Illinois Route 95 forms the northern edge of the village; the highway leads east 6 miles (10 km) to Cuba and west 5.5 miles (8.9 km) to Marietta. Lewistown, the county seat, is 12 miles (19 km) to the southeast via IL 95 and IL 97.

According to the 2021 census gazetteer files, Smithfield has a total area of 0.47 square miles (1.22 km^{2}), all land.

Smithfield is served by the Keokuk Junction Railway, a subsidiary of Pioneer Railcorp. BNSF once used the tracks through Smithfield.

== Demographics ==
Historical population
Census	Pop.	Note	%±
1880	118		—
1900	420		—
1910	389		−7.4%
1920	385		−1.0%
1930	315		−18.2%
1940	359		14.0%
1950	355		−1.1%
1960	329		−7.3%
1970	318		−3.3%
1980	340		6.9%
1990	277		−18.5%
2000	214		−22.7%
2010	230		7.5%
2020	191		−17.0%
U.S. Decennial Census

As of the 2020 census there were 191 people, 100 households, and 57 families residing in the village. The population density was 410.75 inhabitants per square mile (158.59/km^{2}). There were 95 housing units at an average density of 204.30 per square mile (78.88/km^{2}). The racial makeup of the village was 95.81% White, 0.00% African American, 0.00% Native American, 0.00% Asian, 0.00% Pacific Islander, 1.05% from other races, and 3.14% from two or more races. Hispanic or Latino of any race were 1.05% of the population.

There were 100 households, out of which 18.0% had children under the age of 18 living with them, 47.00% were married couples living together, 2.00% had a female householder with no husband present, and 43.00% were non-families. 38.00% of all households were made up of individuals, and 24.00% had someone living alone who was 65 years of age or older. The average household size was 2.19 and the average family size was 1.81.

The village's age distribution consisted of 11.6% under the age of 18, 5.5% from 18 to 24, 18.8% from 25 to 44, 31.5% from 45 to 64, and 32.6% who were 65 years of age or older. The median age was 60.3 years. For every 100 females, there were 112.9 males. For every 100 females age 18 and over, there were 97.5 males.

The median income for a household in the village was $43,750, and the median income for a family was $49,219. Males had a median income of $48,194 versus $22,500 for females. The per capita income for the village was $26,699. About 14.0% of families and 13.3% of the population were below the poverty line, including 38.1% of those under age 18 and 5.1% of those age 65 or over.
