= Spoon River =

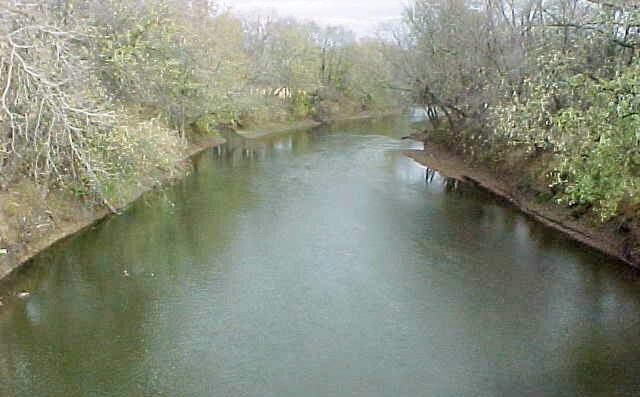
- The Spoon River at the community of Seville in Fulton County

Location
- Country: United States
- State: Illinois

Physical characteristics
- Source
  - location: North of Modena, Stark County
  - coordinates: 41°8′45″N 89°46′10″W
  - elevation: 661 ft (201 m)
- Mouth: Illinois River
  - location: Near Havana, Fulton County
  - coordinates: 40°18′25″N 90°4′14″W
  - elevation: 442 ft (135 m)
- Length: 147 mi (237 km)
- Discharge
  - location: Seville, Illinois
  - average: 1,277 cu/ft. per sec.

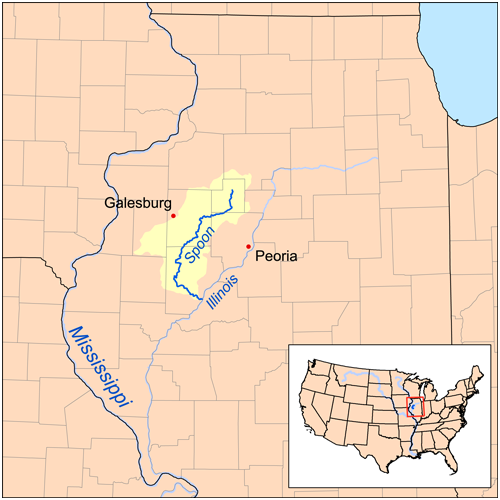
Map showing the Spoon River watershed

The Spoon River is a 147-mile-long (237 km) tributary of the Illinois River in west-central Illinois in the United States. The river drains largely agricultural prairie country between Peoria and Galesburg. The river is noted for giving its name to the fictional Illinois town in the 1915 poetry work Spoon River Anthology by Edgar Lee Masters, who was from Lewistown, which is near the river.

The river rises in two short forks, the West Fork near Kewanee in southern Henry County, and the East Fork in Neponset Township in southwest Bureau County. The East and West forks join in northern Stark County, approximately 10 miles (16 km) southeast of Kewanee, and the combined stream meanders south and southwest through rural Stark, Knox and Fulton counties. The lower portion of the river passes through a scenic region of hills in Fulton County, and passes approximately 5 miles (8 km) southwest of Lewistown. The river joins the Illinois from the west opposite Havana, approximately 40 miles (64 km) downstream and southwest of Peoria.

The Rock Island Trail passes over the Spoon River 1.75 miles (2.82 km) northwest of Wyoming, Illinois.

In 1857 Captain Charles H. Robinson collected a fiddle tune he heard at a country dance at Bradford, Illinois. He sent the tune to Edgar Lee Masters who passed it on to the Australian−American composer Percy Grainger. Grainger used it as the basis for his composition ″Spoon River″ written over the years 1919−1929. Several editions for concert band have been published.

== See also ==
- List of Illinois rivers
- Spoon River Anthology
