= List of crossings of the Upper Mississippi River =

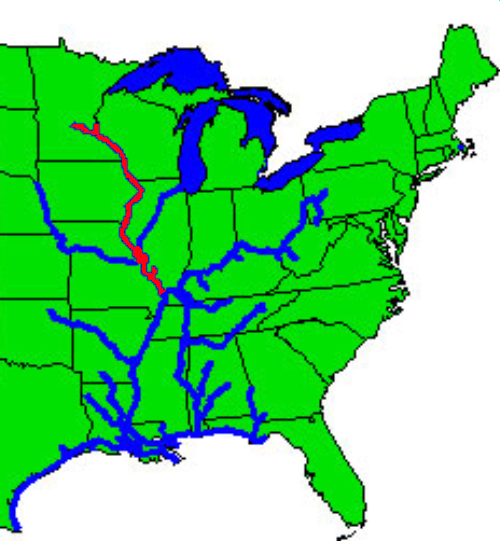
The inland and intercoastal waterways, with the Upper Mississippi highlighted in red.

This is a list of all current and notable former bridges or other crossings of the Upper Mississippi River which begins at the Mississippi River's source and extends to its confluence with the Ohio River at Cairo, Illinois.

== Minnesota ==
=== Headwaters to Crow Wing River ===
Crossing	Location	Miles above the Ohio	Coordinates
Lake Itasca – Source of the Mississippi			47°14′23″N 95°12′28″W
Headwaters rock weir pedestrian ford	Itasca State Park		47°14′23″N 95°12′28″W
Log bridge	Itasca State Park		
Footbridge	Itasca State Park		47°14′22″N 95°12′33″W
Footbridge (accessible)	Itasca State Park		47°14′24″N 95°12′35″W
Hiking / Bicycle path	Itasca State Park		47°14′27″N 95°12′32″W
CSAH 117 (Wilderness Drive)	Itasca State Park		47°14′36″N 95°12′39″W
MN 200	Just north of Itasca S.P.		47°15′12″N 95°13′32″W
CSAH 37	6½ miles east of Zerkel		47°18′40″N 95°14′48″W
CSAH 2 (Great River Road)	4 miles (6.4 km) south of Alida		47°19′34″N 95°13′29″W
CSAH 40	7 miles (11 km) west of Becida		47°20′24″N 95°12′35″W
Stumpghes Rapids Road; State Forest Road (gravel)	Mississippi Headwaters State Forest		47°23′56″N 95°08′52″W
CSAH 5 (Centerline Rd SW)	6 miles (9.7 km) south of Solway		47°26′00″N 95°07′49″W
CSAH 7 (Becida Rd)	6½ miles southwest of Bemidji		47°26′7″N 94°59′55″W
Fern Lake Road SW	4 miles (6.4 km) southwest of Bemidji		47°27′11″N 94°56′56″W
CSAH 11 (Carr Lake SW)	2½ miles south of Bemidji		47°26′11″N 94°53′38″W
US 2 / US 71	Just southwest of Bemidji		47°26′44″N 94°53′20″W
Yellowhead Rd. SE	Just southwest of Bemidji		47°26′46″N 94°53′17″W
BNSF Railway	Bemidji		47°27′59″N 94°52′45″W
Former Soo Line Railroad (abandoned)	Bemidji		47°28′00″N 94°52′43″W
Midway Drive (closed)	Bemidji		47°28′01″N 94°52′42″W
MN 197 (Paul Bunyan Drive)	Bemidji		47°28′03″N 94°52′43″W
Paul Bunyan State Trail; Former Northern Pacific Railway	Bemidji		47°29′30″N 94°50′04″W
Lake Avenue	Bemidji		47°29′30″N 94°49′56″W
Power Dam Road	7 miles (11 km) east of Bemidji		47°28′58″N 94°43′39″W
CSAH 8 (Roosevelt Road)	7 miles (11 km) east of Bemidji		47°27′12″N 94°42′41″W
CSAH 8 (Roosevelt Road)	9½ miles east of Bemidji		47°26′17″N 94°40′19″W
CSAH 33 (Mission Road)	4 miles (6.4 km) north of Cass Lake town		47°26′01″N 94°38′36″W
CSAH 39 (Scenic Hwy)	East end of Cass Lake		47°27′17″N 94°28′29″W
Forest Route 2171	2½ miles east of Beltrami County Road 39		47°26′39″N 94°25′31″W
Former Forest Route 2171 (demolished)	1-mile (1.6 km) east of current USFS Rt. 2171		47°26′43″N 94°24′57″W
Winnibigoshish Lake Dam CSAH 9 / CSAH 9	About 15 miles (24 km) northwest of Deer River		47°25′47″N 94°03′04″W
US 2	Ball Club		47°19′29″N 93°57′35″W
BNSF Railway	Ball Club		47°19′28″N 93°57′35″W
CSAH 18 / CSAH 3	3 miles (4.8 km) southeast of Ball Club		47°18′07″N 93°54′06″W
Days High Landing Bridge CSAH 18 / CSAH 3	Morse Township–Wahnea Township (10 miles (16 km) south of Deer River)		47°15′07″N 93°48′14″W
MN 6	West of Cohasset		47°13′45″N 93°45′29″W
CSAH 62 Central Avenue	Cohasset		47°15′44″N 93°37′22″W
BNSF Grand Rapids Rail Spur Bridge	Cohasset		47°15′05″N 93°35′25″W
Pokegama Dam Pedestrian / Bicycle	Cohasset		47°15′03″N 93°35′15″W
Verne V. Skallman Bridge CSAH 63/Pedestrian and bicycle trail	Grand Rapids		47°14′23″N 93°37′07″W
US 169/Pokegama Avenue	Grand Rapids		47°13′56″N 93°31′42″W
Grand Rapids Mississippi Riverfront Pedestrian Bridge	Grand Rapids		47°13′58″N 93°31′22″W
Robert K. Horn Bridge 7th Avenue East	Grand Rapids		47°13′50″N 93°31′4″W
Bill Powers Memorial Trail Bridge Pedestrian / Bicycle (Summer) Snowmobile (Winter)	Grand Rapids		47°13′44″N 93°30′43″W
Blackberry Bridge CSAH 91/Bluebird Drive (Formerly CSAH 441)	Blackberry Township		47°10′28″N 93°25′15″W
Mississippi, Hill City and Western Railway Co Rail Bridge (Historical)	North of Jacobson		47°01′15″N 93°15′46″W
480th Street Bridge MN 200	Jacobson		47°00′05″N 93°16′07″W
MN 232	Palisade		46°42′33″N 93°29′04″W
Palisade Rail Bridge Soo Line North ATV Trail	Palisade		46°42′32″N 93°29′11″W
US 169	About 11 miles (18 km) northeast of Aitkin		46°39′04″N 93°36′45″W
410th Avenue	Aitkin		46°32′26″N 93°42′27″W
MN 6	East of Wolford		46°32′39″N 93°57′22″W
CSAH 3, formerly MN 25	North of Brainerd		46°22′59″N 94°10′35″W
Washington Street Bridge MN 210	Brainerd		46°21′29″N 94°12′41″W
Brainerd Rail Bridge BNSF Railroad	Brainerd		46°21′23″N 94°12′38″W
Laurel Street Bridge	Brainerd		46°21′20″N 94°12′37″W
College Drive Bridge	Brainerd		46°20′55″N 94°12′28″W
Minnesota Highway 371 Bridge MN 371	South of Baxter		46°18′46″N 94°16′3″W

=== Crow Wing River to Minneapolis–Saint Paul ===
Crossing	Carries	Location	Miles above the Ohio	Coordinates
Camp Ripley Bridge	MN 115	North of Little Falls		46°04′28″N 94°20′06″W
United States Highway 10 Bridge	US 10	North of Little Falls		46°00′00″N 94°22′00″W
Little Falls North Rail Bridge	BNSF Railroad	Little Falls		45°59′07″N 94°21′43″W
Broadway Bridge (Little Falls)	MN 27 (Broadway)	Little Falls		45°58′38″N 94°22′06″W
Little Falls South Rail Bridge	BNSF Railroad	Little Falls		45°58′12″N 94°22′11″W
Soo Line Rail Bridge at Blanchard Dam	Pedestrian/Bike/ATV Trail	Northeast of Bowlus		45°51′37″N 94°21′35″W
Nature Road Bridge	CSAH 26 (Nature Road)	West of Royalton		45°49′32″N 94°21′24″W
125th Street Bridge	CSAH 1 / CSAH 2 (125th Street NW)	West of Rice		45°44′52″N 94°15′42″W
Old Sartell Bridge	Utility lines	Sartell		45°37′05″N 94°12′11″W
Sartell Bridge	CSAH 29 / CSAH 78	Sartell		45°36′58″N 94°12′05″W
Bridge of Hope	MN 15	Sauk Rapids		45°35′54″N 94°11′18″W
Sauk Rapids Regional Bridge	9th Avenue North (St. Cloud) / 2nd Street North (Sauk Rapids)	Sauk Rapids		45°35′17″N 94°10′12″W
Sauk Rapids Bridge (Historical)	Demolished; Replaced by Sauk Rapids Regional Bridge	Sauk Rapids		45°35′11″N 94°10′10″W
St. Cloud Rail Bridge	BNSF Railway	St. Cloud		45°33′50″N 94°09′27″W
Veterans Bridge	First Street North/East Saint Germain Street	St. Cloud		45°33′47″N 94°09′22″W
Granite City Crossing	MN 23	St. Cloud		45°33′40″N 94°09′07″W
University Bridge	University Drive	St. Cloud		45°32′56.5″N 94°08′51″W

=== Minneapolis–Saint Paul metropolitan area ===
Crossing	Carries	Location	Miles above the Ohio	Coordinates
Highway 24 Bridge	MN 24; Replaced previous bridge in 2017	Clearwater		45°25′04″N 94°02′37″W
New I-94 and Highway 10 Interregional Connection Bridge		East of Clearwater		
Highway 25 Bridge	MN 25	Monticello		45°18′31″N 93°47′29″W
Parrish Avenue Bridge	CSAH 42 (Parrish Avenue)	Otsego–Elk River		45°18′06″N 93°33′56″W
Betty Adkins Bridge	MN 101	Otsego–Elk River		45°17′19″N 93°33′29″W
Anoka–Champlin Mississippi River Bridge	US 169	Anoka–Champlin		45°11′30″N 93°23′43″W
Coon Rapids Dam pedestrian and bicycle bridge	pedestrian and bicycle trail	Brooklyn Park–Coon Rapids		45°08′37.64″N 93°18′41.77″W
Richard P. Braun Bridge	MN 610	Brooklyn Park–Coon Rapids	~865	45°07′45″N 93°17′57″W
I-694 Bridge	I-694	Brooklyn Center–Fridley	~860.4	45°04′09″N 93°16′54″W
Camden Bridge	42nd Avenue North to 37th Avenue Northeast	Minneapolis	~857.8	45°01′56″N 93°17′00″W
Canadian Pacific Camden Place Rail Bridge	Canadian Pacific Railway	Minneapolis	~857.6	45°01′56″N 93°17′00″W
Lowry Avenue Bridge	CSAH 153/Lowry Avenue	Minneapolis	~856.4	45°00′47″N 93°16′28″W
Northern Pacific-BNSF Minneapolis Rail Bridge	BNSF Railway	Minneapolis	~855.8	45°00′16″N 93°16′28″W
Broadway Avenue Bridge	CSAH 66/Broadway Avenue	Minneapolis	~855.4	44°59′56″N 93°16′31″W
Plymouth Avenue Bridge	Plymouth Avenue	Minneapolis	~855	44°59′35″N 93°16′23″W
Wisconsin Central Boom Island Rail Bridge	Pedestrian and Bicycle traffic – North end of Nicollet Island to Boom Island Park	Minneapolis	~854.7	44°59′27″N 93°15′56″W
Curved Wisconsin Central Rail Bridge	Abandoned Wisconsin Central Railway over East channel connecting via former tracks on Nicollet Island to Boom Island bridge	Minneapolis	~854.5	44°59′20.5″N 93°15′42″W
BNSF East Channel Rail Bridge	BNSF Railway over Nicollet Island East channel	Minneapolis	~854.5	44°59′20″N 93°15′41″W
Minneapolis BNSF Rail Bridge	BNSF Railway over the main river channel West of Nicollet Island	Minneapolis	~854.5	44°59′16″N 93°15′57″W
First Avenue Bridge	First Avenue over river channel East of Nicollet Island	Minneapolis	~854.4	44°59′14″N 93°15′38″W
East Hennepin Avenue Bridge	CSAH 52/East Hennepin Avenue over river channel East of Nicollet Island	Minneapolis	~854.3	44°59′12″N 93°15′36″W
Hennepin Avenue Bridge	CSAH 52/Hennepin Avenue over main river channel West of Nicollet Island	Minneapolis	~854.3	44°59′07″N 93°15′50″W
Merriam Street Bridge	Merriam Street over East channel of Nicollet Island	Minneapolis	~854.2	44°59′09″N 93°15′34″W
Third Avenue Bridge	MN 65/Central Avenue SE/Third Avenue S	Minneapolis	~854.1	44°58′58″N 93°15′40″W
Stone Arch Bridge	pedestrian and bicycle traffic	Minneapolis	~853.6	44°58′51″N 93°15′13″W
Tenth Avenue (Wagon) Bridge	10th Avenue South to 6th Avenue Southeast (demolished)	Minneapolis	~853.5	
Lower Saint Anthony Falls Lock and dam	restricted catwalk	Minneapolis	~853.3	44°58′44″N 93°14′52″W
I-35W Mississippi River bridge	Collapsed August 1, 2007 formerly I-35W	Minneapolis	~853.2	44°58′44″N 93°14′42″W
I-35W Saint Anthony Falls Bridge	I-35W	Minneapolis	~853.2	44°58′44″N 93°14′42″W
10th Avenue Bridge	10th Avenue SE to 19th Avenue South	Minneapolis	~853.1	44°58′44″N 93°14′38″W
Northern Pacific Bridge Number 9	pedestrian and bicycle trail	Minneapolis	~853	44°58′40″N 93°14′28″W
Washington Avenue Bridge (Minneapolis)	Lower Deck: CSAH 122/Washington Avenue and METRO Green Line light rail Upper Deck: Pedestrian and bicycle	Minneapolis	~852.6	44°58′24″N 93°14′21″W
Dartmouth Bridge	I-94	Minneapolis	~851.7	44°57′58″N 93°13′33″W
Franklin Avenue Bridge	CSAH 5/E Franklin Avenue	Minneapolis	~851.5	44°57′50″N 93°13′22″W
Short Line Bridge	Canadian Pacific Railway	Minneapolis	~850.7	44°57′22″N 93°12′45″W
Lake Street-Marshall Bridge	Lake Street and Marshall Avenue	Minneapolis–St. Paul	~849.9	44°56′54″N 93°15′06″W
Intercity Bridge / Ford Bridge	46th Street and Ford Parkway	Minneapolis–St. Paul	~847.6	44°55′04″N 93°12′05″W
Fort Road Bridge	MN 5	Saint Paul–Fort Snelling	~845.6	44°53′40″N 93°10′54″W
Lexington Bridge	I-35E	Saint Paul–Lilydale,	~843.3	44°54′16″N 93°08′20″W
Omaha Road Bridge Number 15	Union Pacific Railroad	Saint Paul	~841.4	44°55′24″N 93°07′02″W
High Bridge (St. Paul)	MN 149/Smith Ave	Saint Paul	~840.5	44°56′00″N 93°06′16″W
Raspberry Island Bridge	Vehicles, bicycles, and pedestrians over south channel of Raspberry Island	Saint Paul	~839.5	44°56′34″N 93°05′31″W
Wabasha Street Bridge	Wabasha Street	Saint Paul	~839.5	44°56′34″N 93°05′31″W
St. Paul Union Pacific Vertical-lift Rail Bridge	Union Pacific Railroad	Saint Paul	~839.3	44°56′39″N 93°05′18″W
Robert Street Bridge	Robert Street	Saint Paul	~839.2	44°56′38.13″N 93°05′14.65″W
Lafayette Bridge	US 52	Saint Paul	~838.8	44°56′48″N 93°04′45″W
St. Paul Union Pacific Rail Bridge	Union Pacific Railroad	Saint Paul–West Saint Paul	~835.6	44°55′07″N 93°02′03″W
Wakota Bridge	I-494	South St. Paul–Newport	~832.4	44°52′59″N 93°00′54″W
Rock Island Swing Bridge	Former Rock Island Railroad and 66th Street East to 3rd Avenue East	Inver Grove Heights–Saint Paul Park	~830.3	44°51′12″N 93°00′32″W
Hastings High Bridge	Demolished	Hastings	~814	44°44′47″N 92°51′10″W
Hastings Bridge	US 61	Hastings	~814	44°44′48.48″N 92°51′10.7994″W
Hastings Rail Bridge	Canadian Pacific Railway (Former Milwaukee Road)	Hastings	~813.7	44°44′48″N 92°50′52″W

== Minnesota–Wisconsin ==
Crossing	Carries	Location	Miles above the Ohio	Coordinates
Lloyd Spriggle Memorial Bridge (Wisconsin Channel)	US 63	Red Wing–Trenton	~792.6	44°35′18″N 92°32′36″W
Red Wing Bridge (Minnesota Channel)	US 63	Red Wing–Trenton	~790.6	44°34′12″N 92°32′02″W
Wabasha Rail Bridge	Demolished Railroad	Wabasha–Nelson	~762.6	44°24′02″N 92°04′17″W
Wabasha–Nelson Bridge	MN 60 / WIS 25	Wabasha–Nelson	~760.2	44°25′09″N 92°01′58″W
Main Channel Bridge	MN 43 / WIS 54	Winona–Buffalo	~725.8	44°03′26″N 91°38′24″W
North Channel Bridge	MN 43 / WIS 54	Winona–Buffalo	~725.8	
Winona Rail Bridge	Demolished Railroad	Winona–Buffalo	~725.7	44°03′30″N 91°38′11″W
Winona Green Bay and Western Rail Bridge	Demolished Railroad	Winona–Buffalo	~723.9	44°02′41″N 91°36′24″W
I-90 Mississippi River Bridge	I-90	Dresbach Township–Campbell	~701.8	43°51′28″N 91°17′57″W
La Crosse Rail Bridge	Canadian Pacific Railway	La Crescent–Campbell	~699.8	43°49′59″N 91°16′54″W
Mississippi River Bridge (Main Channel)	US 14 / US 61 / MN 16 / WIS 16	La Crescent–La Crosse	~697.5	43°48′33″N 91°15′34″W
La Crosse West Channel Bridge (West Channel)	US 14 / US 61 / MN 16 / WIS 16	La Crescent–La Crosse	~697.5	43°48′33″N 91°15′34″W

== Iowa–Wisconsin ==
Crossing	Photo	Carries	Location	Miles above the Ohio	Coordinates
Black Hawk Bridge		Iowa Highway 9, Wisconsin Highway 82	Lansing, Freeman	663.4	
Pile–Pontoon Railroad Bridge		Demolished railroad	Marquette, Prairie du Chien	634.7	
Marquette–Joliet Bridge		U.S. Route 18, Wisconsin Highway 60	Marquette, Prairie du Chien	634.7	
Cassville Car Ferry		Automotive / bicycle / pedestrian	Buena Vista Township, Cassville	607	
Eagle Point Bridge		U.S. Route 61, U.S. Route 151 (demolished)	Dubuque, Jamestown	582.8	
Dubuque–Wisconsin Bridge		U.S. Route 61, U.S. Route 151	Dubuque, Jamestown	581	

== Iowa–Illinois ==
Crossing	Carries	Location	Miles above the Ohio	Coordinates
Dubuque Rail Bridge	Canadian National Railway Dubuque Subdivision former Illinois Central Railroad (with Chicago Great Western Railway crossing rights)	Dubuque–East Dubuque	580	42°29′55″N 90°39′01″W
Julien Dubuque Bridge	US 20	Dubuque–East Dubuque	~579.5	42°29′30″N 90°39′22″W
Dale Gardner Veterans Memorial Bridge	US 52 / Iowa 64 / IL 64	Union Township–Savanna	537.7	42°06′15″N 90°09′38″W
Savanna–Sabula Bridge (Historical)	US 52 / Iowa 64 / IL 64	Union Township–Savanna	537.7	42°06′15″N 90°09′38″W
Sabula Rail Bridge	Canadian Pacific Chicago Subdivision former Iowa, Chicago, & Eastern Railroad, Milwaukee Road	Sabula–Savanna Township	535	42°03′51″N 90°09′58″W
Mark Morris Memorial Bridge	Iowa 136 / IL 136	Clinton–Fulton	520	41°51′53″N 90°10′23″W
Gateway Bridge	US 30	Clinton–Garden Plain Township	~518	41°50′16″N 90°11′02″W
Chicago and Northwestern Railroad Bridge	Union Pacific Railroad Geneva Subdivision former Chicago and North Western Railway	Clinton–Garden Plain Township	518	41°50′11″N 90°11′05″W
Fred Schwengel Memorial Bridge	I-80	LeClaire–Hampton Township	~495.5	41°34′49″N 90°21′54″W
I-74 Bridge / Iowa–Illinois Memorial Bridge	I-74 / US 6	Bettendorf–Moline	~485	41°31′12″N 90°30′48″W
Government Bridge	Iowa Interstate Railroad Iowa City Subdivision former Chicago, Rock Island and Pacific Railroad	Davenport–Rock Island Arsenal	483	41°31′09″N 90°34′01″W
Rock Island Centennial Bridge	US 67	Davenport–Rock Island	482	41°30′54″N 90°34′54″W
Crescent Rail Bridge	BNSF Railway former Davenport, Rock Island and Northwestern Railroad	Davenport–Rock Island	~481.5	41°30′42″N 90°35′41″W
Sergeant John F. Baker Jr. Bridge	I-280	Davenport–Blackhawk Township	~478.3	41°28′45″N 90°37′56″W
Norbert F. Beckey Bridge	Iowa 92 / IL 92	Muscatine–Drury Township	456	41°25′21″N 91°02′01″W
Keithsburg Rail Bridge	Railroad (abandoned) former Minneapolis and St. Louis Railway	Eliot Township–Keithsburg	428	41°06′18″N 90°57′10″W
Great River Bridge	US 34	Burlington–Gulf Port	404	40°48′43″N 91°05′44″W
Burlington Rail Bridge	BNSF Railway Ottumwa Subdivision former Chicago, Burlington & Quincy Railroad	Burlington–Gulf Port	403	40°47′55″N 91°05′31″W
Fort Madison Toll Bridge	IL 9 BNSF Railway Chillicothe Subdivision former Santa Fe Railway	Fort Madison–Niota	~384	40°37′37″N 91°17′45″W
Keokuk Rail Bridge	Keokuk Junction Railway former Toledo, Peoria and Western Railroad	Keokuk–Hamilton	~364.1	40°23′28″N 91°22′24″W
Keokuk–Hamilton Bridge	US 136	Keokuk–Hamilton	~363.9	40°23′25″N 91°22′24″W

== Missouri–Illinois ==
Crossing	Carries	Location	Miles above the Ohio	Coordinates
Quincy Rail Bridge	BNSF Railway Brookfield Subdivision formerly Chicago, Burlington & Quincy Railroad	Fabius Township–Quincy	328	39°56′30″N 91°25′51″W
Bayview Bridge	US 24 westbound	Fabius Township–Quincy	327	39°56′00″N 91°25′17″W
Quincy Memorial Bridge	US 24 eastbound	Fabius Township–Quincy	327	39°55′53″N 91°25′14″W
Wabash Bridge	Norfolk Southern Railway Springfield–Hannibal District formerly Wabash Railroad	Hannibal–Levee Township	~309.9	39°43′27″N 91°21′44″W
Mark Twain Memorial Bridge	I-72 / US 36	Hannibal–Levee Township	~309.5	39°43′13″N 91°21′30″W
Old Mark Twain Memorial Bridge (Historical)	Demolished	Hannibal–Levee Township	309	39°42′58″N 91°21′15″W
Champ Clark Bridge	US 54	Louisiana–Atlas Township	283	39°27′24″N 91°02′52″W
Old Champ Clark Bridge (Historical)	Demolished as of 2019	Louisiana–Atlas Township	283	39°27′24″N 91°02′52″W
Louisiana Rail Bridge	Kansas City Southern Railway Roodhouse Subdivision formerly Alton Railroad	Louisiana–Ross Township	282	39°26′43″N 91°02′01″W
Golden Eagle Ferry	Automotive / pedestrian	Rivers Township–Point Precinct	228	38°57′44″N 90°26′13″W
Grafton Ferry	Automotive / pedestrian (seasonal)	Rivers Township–Grafton	218	38°52′07″N 90°34′03″W
Alton Bridge (Historical)	formerly Burlington Northern (Demolished 1988)	West Alton–Alton	~202.9	38°52′53″N 90°11′09″W
Old Clark Bridge (Historical)	Demolished; US 67	West Alton–Alton	~202.9	38°53′01″N 90°10′57″W
Clark Bridge	US 67	West Alton–Alton	~202.8	38°52′56″N 90°10′44″W
New Chain of Rocks Bridge	I-270	St. Louis–Chouteau Township	~190.8	38°45′53″N 90°10′25″W
Chain of Rocks Bridge	Bicycle trail formerly US 66	St. Louis–Chouteau Township	~190.5	38°45′38″N 90°10′35″W
Merchants Bridge	Terminal Railroad Association of St. Louis Merchants Subdivision	St. Louis–Venice	~183.3	38°40′29″N 90°11′10″W
McKinley Bridge	US 66 formerly Illinois Traction System interurban electric railway	St. Louis–Venice	~182.6	38°39′54″N 90°10′58″W
Stan Musial Veterans Memorial Bridge	I-70	St. Louis–Brooklyn	~181.2	Est.38°38′40″N 90°10′42″W
Martin Luther King Bridge	Route 799	St. Louis–East St. Louis	~180.2	38°37′52″N 90°10′46″W
Eads Bridge	Washington Avenue; St. Louis MetroLink	St. Louis–East St. Louis	~180	38°37′45″N 90°10′47″W
Poplar Street Bridge	I-55 / I-64 / US 40	St. Louis–East St. Louis	~179.2	38°37′05″N 90°10′59″W
MacArthur Bridge	Terminal Railroad Association of St. Louis MacArthur Bridge Subdivision	St. Louis–East St. Louis	~178.8	38°36′53″N 90°11′01″W
Jefferson Barracks Bridge	I-255 / US 50	Mehlville–Precinct 10	~168.8	38°29′14″N 90°16′38″W
Ste. Genevieve - Modoc River Ferry	Automotive / pedestrian	Ste. Genevieve Township–Brewerville Precinct	~125.5	38°00′25″N 90°03′21″W
Chester Bridge	Route 51 / IL 150	Bois Brule Township–Chester	~109.9	37°54′11″N 89°50′11″W
Grand Tower Pipeline Bridge	Natural gas	Brazeau Township–Grand Tower	~80.8	37°38′31″N 89°31′03″W
Cape Girardeau Bridge (Historical)	Demolished	Cape Girardeau–McClure Precinct	~51.6	37°17′50″N 89°30′57″W
Bill Emerson Memorial Bridge	Route 34 / Route 74 / IL 146	Cape Girardeau–McClure Precinct	~51.5	37°17′43″N 89°30′57″W
Thebes Bridge	Union Pacific Railroad Chester Subdivision	Kelso Township–Thebes	~43.6	37°13′00″N 89°28′01″W
Cairo I-57 Bridge	I-57	Tywappity Township–Cairo	~7.5	37°01′23″N 89°12′42″W
Cairo Mississippi River Bridge	US 60 / US 62	Ohio Township–Cairo	~1.5	36°58′43″N 89°08′52″W

Confluence with the Ohio River (See List of crossings of the Lower Mississippi River)

== See also ==
- List of crossings of the Lower Mississippi River
- List of crossings of the Ohio River
- List of crossings of the Missouri River
- List of locks and dams of the Upper Mississippi River
