= Wabasha Rail Bridge (historical) =

Coordinates: 44°24′10″N 92°4′16″W

The Wabasha Rail Bridge was a floating pontoon bridge which crossed the Mississippi River north of Wabasha, Minnesota, between Reads Landing, Minnesota and Trevino, Wisconsin. The Milwaukee Road constructed the bridge in 1882, connecting the Chippewa Valley Line to the Milwaukee Road Main Line on the Minnesota side of the Mississippi River. The bridge was similar to the Pile-Pontoon Railroad Bridge at Prairie du Chien, Wisconsin.

Replacement spans were built in 1890 and 1932. Use of the bridge was discontinued in 1951 following a washout; the Milwaukee Road instead obtained trackage rights from Winona, Minnesota to Trevino, to continue use of the Chippewa Valley Line.

== See also ==
- List of crossings of the Upper Mississippi River
