= St. Cloud Rail Bridge =

Bridge across the Mississippi River in St. Cloud, Minnesota

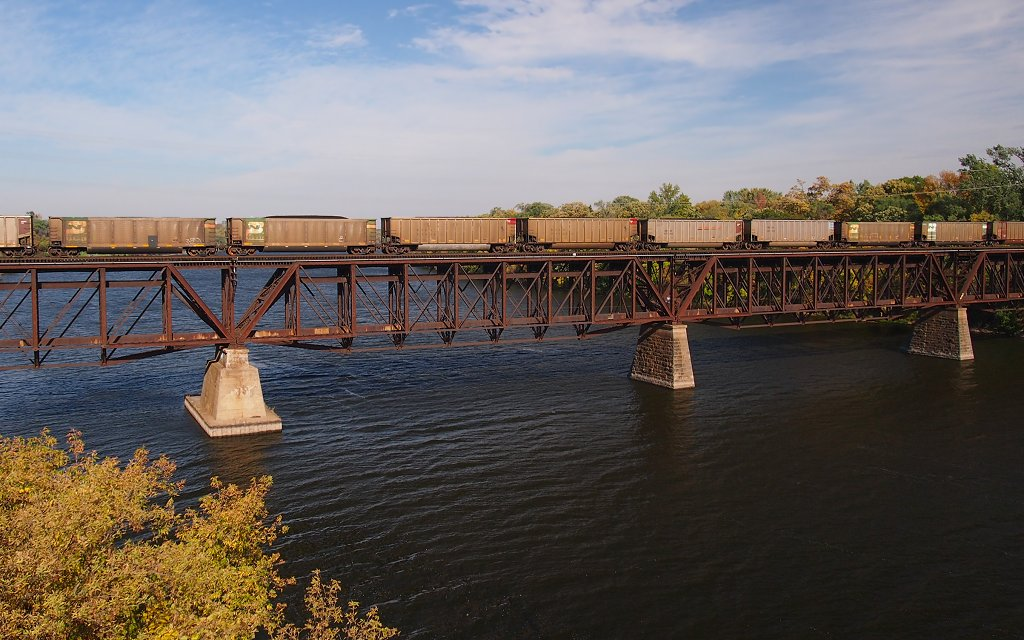
- The St. Cloud Rail Bridge from the Veterans Bridge just downstream
- Coordinates: 45°33′50″N 94°09′27″W
- Carries: One track of the BNSF Railway
- Crosses: Mississippi River
- Locale: St. Cloud, Minnesota
- Maintained by: BNSF Railway
- ID number: 74.2

Characteristics
- Design: Four-span high deck pin-connected truss bridge
- Total length: 587 feet
- Width: One track
- Longest span: 170 feet
- Clearance below: 20 feet

History
- Opened: 1892

The St. Cloud Rail Bridge is a pin-connected truss bridge that spans the Mississippi River in St. Cloud, Minnesota, United States. It was built in 1892 by Great Northern Railway and was probably designed by the railroad. Two of the piers are stone, while a third pier is newer and made of concrete. The bridge has an extra set of bracing that hangs about ten feet below the bottom trusses, appearing to hang like a hammock. This was added to increase the capacity of the bridge.

The Bridge is owned by Burlington Northern Santa Fe and used by BNSF and Northern Lines Railway to access the truncated rail lines that once extended to the northwest and southwest, west of the Mississippi River. The active rail lines currently extend through St. Cloud and Waite Park, MN with branches extending to St. Joseph, MN and Rockville, MN.

== See also ==
- List of crossings of the Upper Mississippi River
