= Tywappity Township =

Tywappity Township may refer to the following townships in the U.S. state of Missouri:

- Tywappity Township, Mississippi County, Missouri
- Tywappity Township, Scott County, Missouri
