= University Bridge =

University Bridge may refer to:

- University Bridge (Saskatoon), Saskatchewan, Canada
- University Bridge (Seattle), Washington, United States of America
- University Bridge (St. Cloud), Minnesota, United States of America
- University Heights Bridge, crosses the Harlem River, connecting West 207th Street in the Inwood neighborhood of Manhattan to West Fordham Road in the University Heights section of the Bronx
- University Avenue Bridge, crosses the Schuylkill River in Philadelphia, Pennsylvania
