= DeSoto Bridge =

Bridge in St. Cloud, Minnesota, U.S.

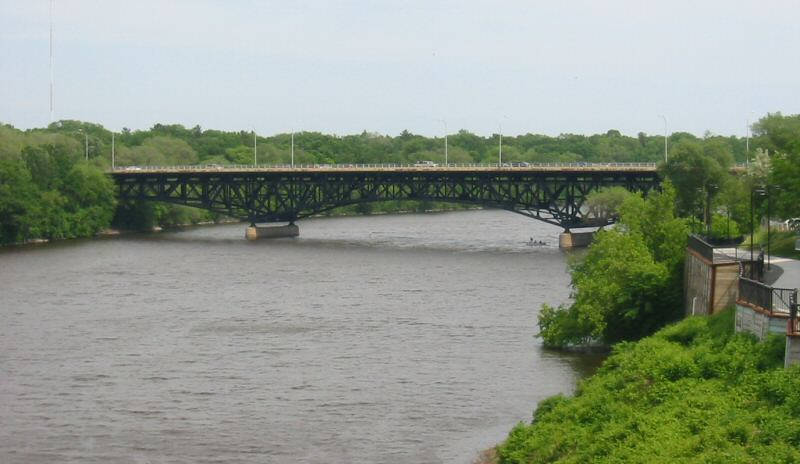
- The DeSoto Bridge as viewed from the north.
- Coordinates: 45°33′40″N 94°09′07″W
- Carries: Four lanes of MN 23
- Crosses: Mississippi River
- Locale: St. Cloud Minnesota, United States
- Maintained by: Minnesota Department of Transportation
- ID number: 6748

Characteristics
- Design: Trussed deck-arch bridge
- Total length: 890 feet
- Width: 70.5 feet
- Longest span: 280 feet
- Clearance below: 32 feet

History
- Opened: 1958
- Closed: 2008

DeSoto Bridge was a trussed deck-arch bridge that spanned the Mississippi River in St. Cloud, Minnesota. It was built in 1958 by the Minnesota Department of Transportation. The bridge was painted black, which is typical for railroad bridges but unusual for a highway bridge. The river banks on either side are relatively high, so the bridge required deep trusses which arched over the river.

After the collapse of the I-35W Mississippi River bridge in Minneapolis on August 1, 2007, Minnesota Governor Tim Pawlenty ordered the DeSoto Bridge and two other bridges in Minnesota to be inspected. The three bridges have a design similar to that of the former I-35W bridge.

The bridge was inspected on August 3, 2007 and found to be structurally sound. However, on March 20, 2008, four gusset plates were found to be bent. The bridge was closed indefinitely as a precaution and demolished in October 2008.

After inspections by the Minnesota Department of Transportation and the National Transportation Safety Board, it was determined that the DeSoto Bridge should be replaced. The replacement project started in September 2008 and was originally projected to be completed by June 2010. The new replacement bridge, named the Granite City Crossing, opened October 29, 2009.

== See also ==
- List of crossings of the Upper Mississippi River
