= St. Paul Union Pacific Vertical-lift Rail Bridge =

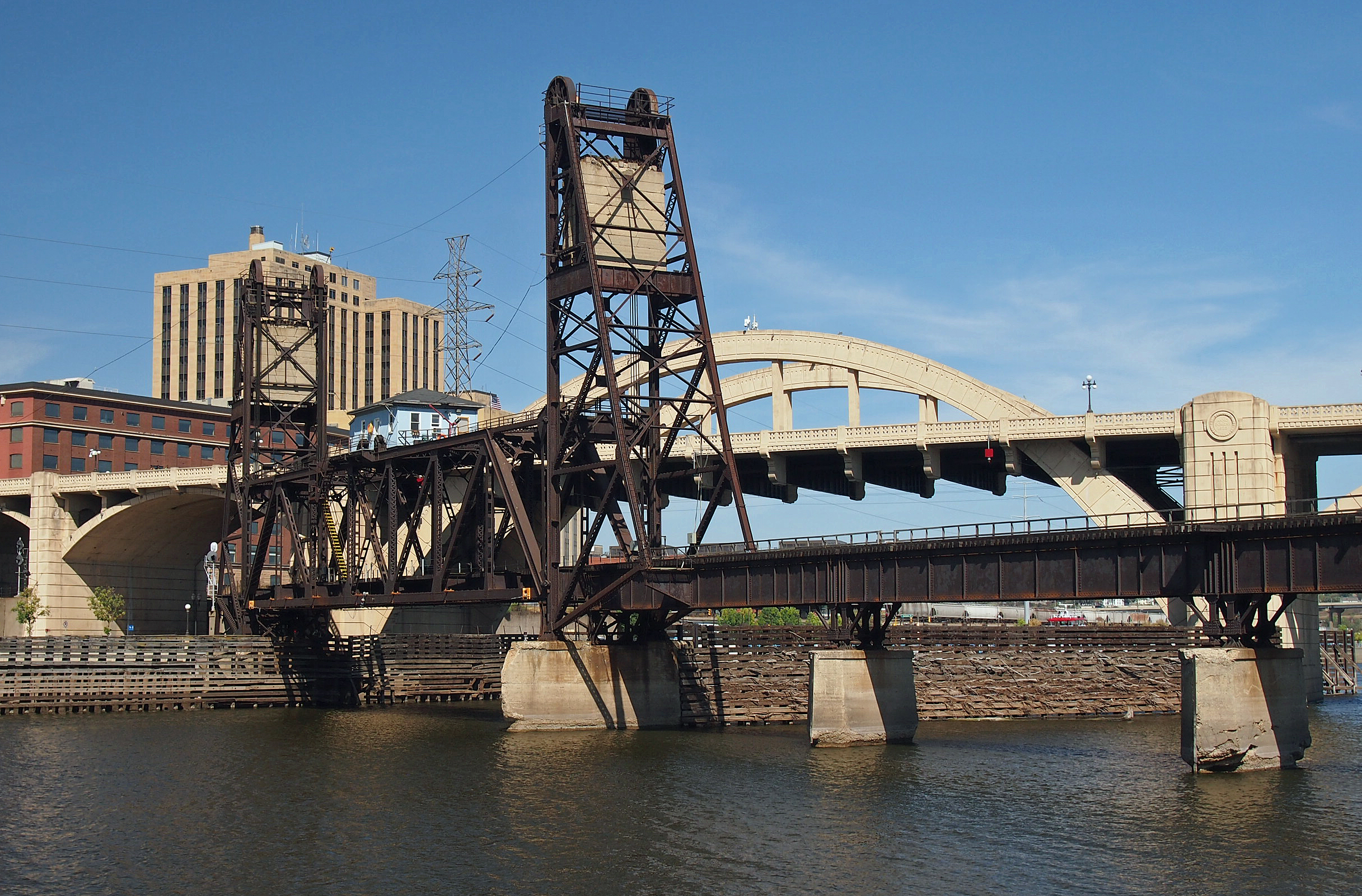
- The St. Paul Union Pacific Vertical-lift Rail Bridge with the Robert Street Bridge in the background
- Coordinates: 44°56′39″N 93°05′18″W
- Carries: One track of the Union Pacific Railroad
- Crosses: Mississippi River
- Locale: St. Paul, Minnesota
- Maintained by: Union Pacific Railroad
- ID number: L332

Characteristics
- Design: Vertical-lift bridge
- Total length: 940 feet
- Width: 21.9 feet
- Longest span: 192 feet
- Clearance below: 72 feet (with span lifted)

History
- Opened: 1913

The St. Paul Union Pacific Vertical-lift Rail Bridge is a vertical-lift bridge that spans the Mississippi River in downtown St. Paul, Minnesota, United States. It is one of only three vertical-lift bridges along the Mississippi River, along with the Hastings Rail Bridge in Hastings, Minnesota, and the Wabash Bridge in Hannibal, Missouri. It was designed by Waddell & Harrington and built in 1913. In 1925, the north end of the bridge was raised about 16 feet (4.9 m) to tie in with tracks that served the St. Paul Union Depot yard. The vertical-lift span has 105-foot-high (32 m) towers, and the electrical lift system was built with a possible 45-foot (14 m) elevation. However, by 1973, the amount of lift was reduced to 37 feet (11 m) because of aging of the equipment.

The bridge was originally built by the Chicago Great Western Railroad, which later became part of the Chicago and North Western Transportation Company. The Robert Street Bridge, built later in 1926, had to be carefully engineered around the railroad bridge.

In April 1997, high water on the Mississippi River reached the bottom of the span. The Union Pacific Railroad spotted a train of hopper cars laden with rocks on the bridge to help anchor it and keep it from being washed away.

In 2021, Union Pacific proposed demolishing the bridge and building a replacement with a drawbridge design.

== See also ==
- List of crossings of the Upper Mississippi River
