= Soo Line Rail Bridge at Blanchard Dam =

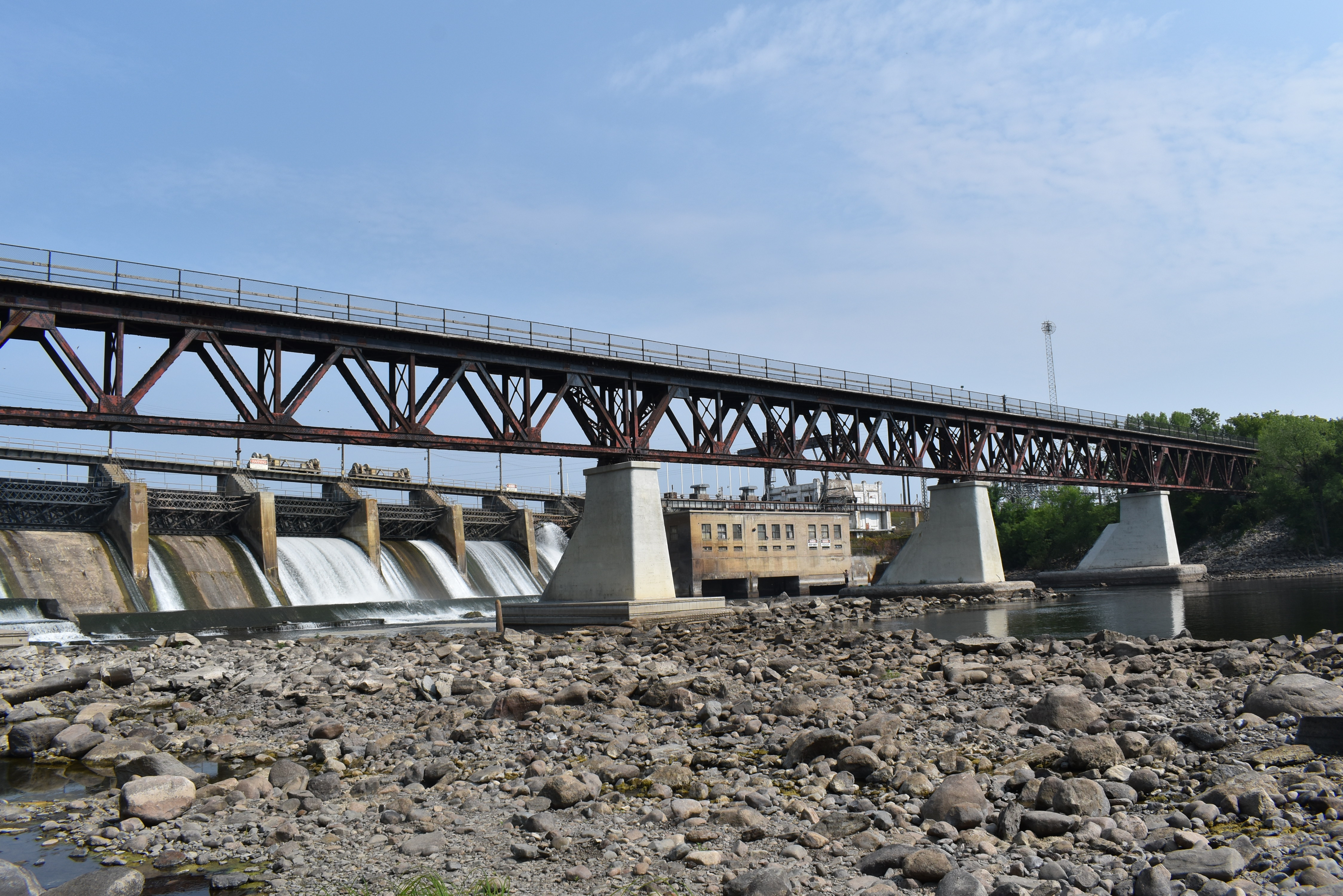
- The Soo Line Bridge with the Blanchard Dam in the background.
- Coordinates: 45°51′37″N 94°21′35″W
- Carries: Pedestrian/bike/ATV trail
- Crosses: Mississippi River
- Maintained by: Minnesota Department of Natural Resources

Characteristics
- Design: Deck truss bridge
- Total length: 605 feet (184 m)
- Width: 1 track/2 trail lanes
- Longest span: 105 feet (32 m)
- Clearance below: 50 feet (15 m)

History
- Opened: 1909

The Soo Line Rail Bridge (Blanchard Dam) is a steel deck truss bridge, built by the Minneapolis, St. Paul and Sault Ste. Marie Railway in 1909. The bridge crosses the Mississippi River northeast of Bowlus, Minnesota. The rail line was abandoned in 1993, and converted to a pedestrian/bicycle bridge as part of the Soo Line Recreation Trail in 2007. The bridge is directly downstream of the Blanchard Dam.

== See also ==
- List of crossings of the Upper Mississippi River
