= Northern Lines Railway =

Shortline railroad in Minnesota, US

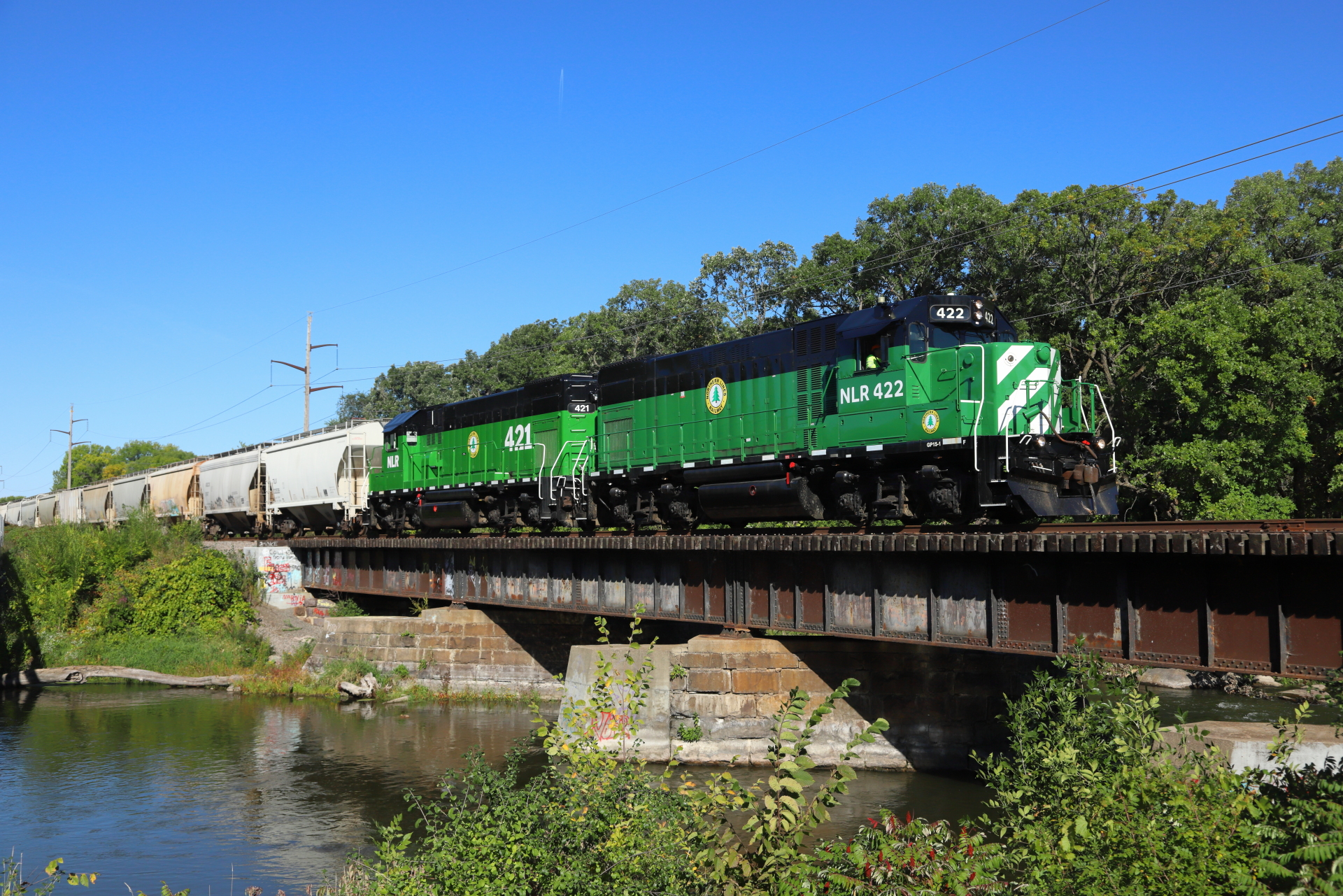
- NLR EMD GP15-1 #422 and #421 at Waite Park, 2021

Overview
- Headquarters: St. Cloud, Minnesota
- Reporting mark: NLR
- Locale: Minnesota; United States
- Dates of operation: 2005–

Technical
- Track gauge: 4 ft 8 1/2 in (1,435 mm) standard gauge

Other
- Website: anacostia.com/railroads/nlr

Northern Lines Railway (reporting mark NLR) is a shortline railroad operating 17 miles (27 km) of track in and near St. Cloud in central Minnesota. The railroad was formed in 2004 to operate BNSF Railway trackage in and near the St. Cloud area and started operations in 2005. Interchange is made with BNSF in east St. Cloud or at the rail yard in central St. Cloud.

== Lines ==
From the connection with BNSF in east St. Cloud Northern Lines Railway's mainline crosses the Mississippi River on the 1892 St. Cloud Rail Bridge, passes through the northern part of downtown St. Cloud, and reaches the large rail yard in central St. Cloud.

After the rail yard the line continues west into Waite Park where it splits. The St. Joseph branch continues westward, through the site of the longtime Great Northern car shops, through an industrial area, crosses the Sauk River and continues on to an industrial park in St. Joseph, approximately 4.2 miles (6.8 km) beyond the junction, where the line now ends. This line once extended through to Moorhead, Minnesota and the northernmost portion of the once through line continues to be operated by Otter Tail Valley Railroad.

The Rockville branch extends from the junction in Waite Park southwestward and terminates in Rockville, approximately 9.0 miles (14.5 km) beyond the split. In 2012, Archer Daniels Midland constructed a shuttle loading grain elevator on the Rockville line between Waite Park and Rockville, joining Wenner Gas's propane terminal (expanded in 2014) in Rockville and Martin Marietta Materials's aggregate quarry in Waite Park as customers on the line. This line once extended through to Willmar but was abandoned in the 1980s by Burlington Northern.

In addition to the main line and the two branches the railroad serves several customers in east St. Cloud via trackage rights on BNSF track.

== Traffic ==
As of 2021 traffic from approximately 20 customers consists mainly of aggregates, building products, chemicals, coal, food products, grain, lumber, manufactured goods, paper, propane, scrap, steel and stone. According to the railroad it handles approximately 10,500 carloads per year.

The railroad is owned by Anacostia and Pacific Company, Inc and has its local headquarters in the old Great Northern depot at the rail yard in central St. Cloud.

== Abandoned Trackage ==
Until the rail was removed in 2018, the East St. Cloud branch extended from the connection with BNSF in east St. Cloud, crossed U.S. Route 10, and terminated at the former Quebecor World printing plant in Sauk Rapids, approximately 2 miles (3.2 km).

Until 2012 the Cold Spring/Rockville branch extended southwestward from its connection in Waite Park, passed through Rockville and terminated just west of Cold Spring, approximately 16 miles (26 km). However, in 2011 Northern Lines applied to discontinue 7 miles (11 km) of service between Rockville and Cold Spring and in early 2012 track owner BNSF received permission to abandon the westernmost 3 miles (4.8 km) of track and convert an additional 4 miles (6.4 km) between Cold Spring and Rockville to industry track. Track was removed in Cold Spring and the last train, loaded with ties, left Cold Spring on August 22, 2012.
