= Florence Bridge (Alabama) =

- Coordinates: 34.7839°N 87.6694°W
- Crosses: Tennessee River

History
- Opened: 1840
- Closed: 1976

Location
- Interactive map of Florence Bridge

The Florence Bridge was a vertical-lift bridge that spanned the Tennessee River in Alabama between Florence and Sheffield. It was built in 1840 and closed in 1976. The bridge is now partially reopened as a recreational walking trail.

== History ==
The first attempt at building a bridge across the Tennessee River at Florence was attempted in the 1830s, but was met with failure as a flood destroyed the bridge shortly after its completion.

A second bridge was built in the late 1830s and opened for traffic in 1840 with the goal of replacing the ferry that operated in the same location.

After suffering damage from tornadoes in 1850 and 1854, the bridge was temporarily closed during both events, with a temporary ferry being opened to accommodate. Following the second tornado, the bridge was sold to the Memphis and Charleston Railroad, who intended to upgrade the bridge and connect it with the Tuscumbia, Courtland and Decatur Railroad, which had also been purchased by the company. In 1860, the bridge was reopened, now servicing steam locomotives alongside foot and horse traffic.

During the American Civil War, Confederate General Albert Sidney Johnston ordered Benjamin Hardin Helm to burn the bridge to impede federal troops advancing through Florence. The bridge was destroyed by April 13, 1862 when Ormsby M. Mitchel marched Union troops through the city.

The Memphis and Charleston Railroad rebuilt the bridge in 1870, following the end of the war. The bridge was later reorganized into the Southern Railway (U.S.) following its acquisition of the Memphis and Charleston Railroad.

In 1892 a span in the bridge failed while a steam locomotive was crossing the bridge.

A streetcar service ran across the bridge from 1904 to 1933. The bridge featured two decks, a railroad deck above and a traffic deck below, accessible by toll. The construction of the O'Neal Bridge by the highway department marked the end of the Florence Bridge's traffic service. The rail line continued to run until the Tennessee Valley Authority ceased operation of its Phosphate mining and plants.

In 1992, the lift span was relocated to Hannibal, Missouri, where it replaced the Swing span on the Wabash Bridge.
