= Lloyd Spriggle Memorial Bridge =

- Coordinates: 44°35′18″N 92°32′36″W
- Carries: US 63
- Crosses: Mississippi River
- Locale: Hager City, Wisconsin
- Maintained by: Wisconsin Department of Transportation

Characteristics
- Design: Steel girder bridge
- Total length: 739 feet
- Width: 30 feet
- Clearance below: 18 feet

History
- Opened: September 1960

The Lloyd Spriggle Memorial Bridge is a steel girder bridge with a concrete deck, crossing the Wisconsin Channel of the Mississippi River, which is the secondary channel at this point. The bridge carries U.S. Route 63 (US 63), connecting to the Eisenhower Bridge, which crosses the Minnesota Channel (Main Channel) of the Mississippi River at Red Wing, Minnesota. The bridge was named for Lloyd Spriggle, a longtime local leader who worked for environmental protection, including protections of local lakes, rivers, and streams.
