= Northern Pacific-BNSF Minneapolis Rail Bridge =

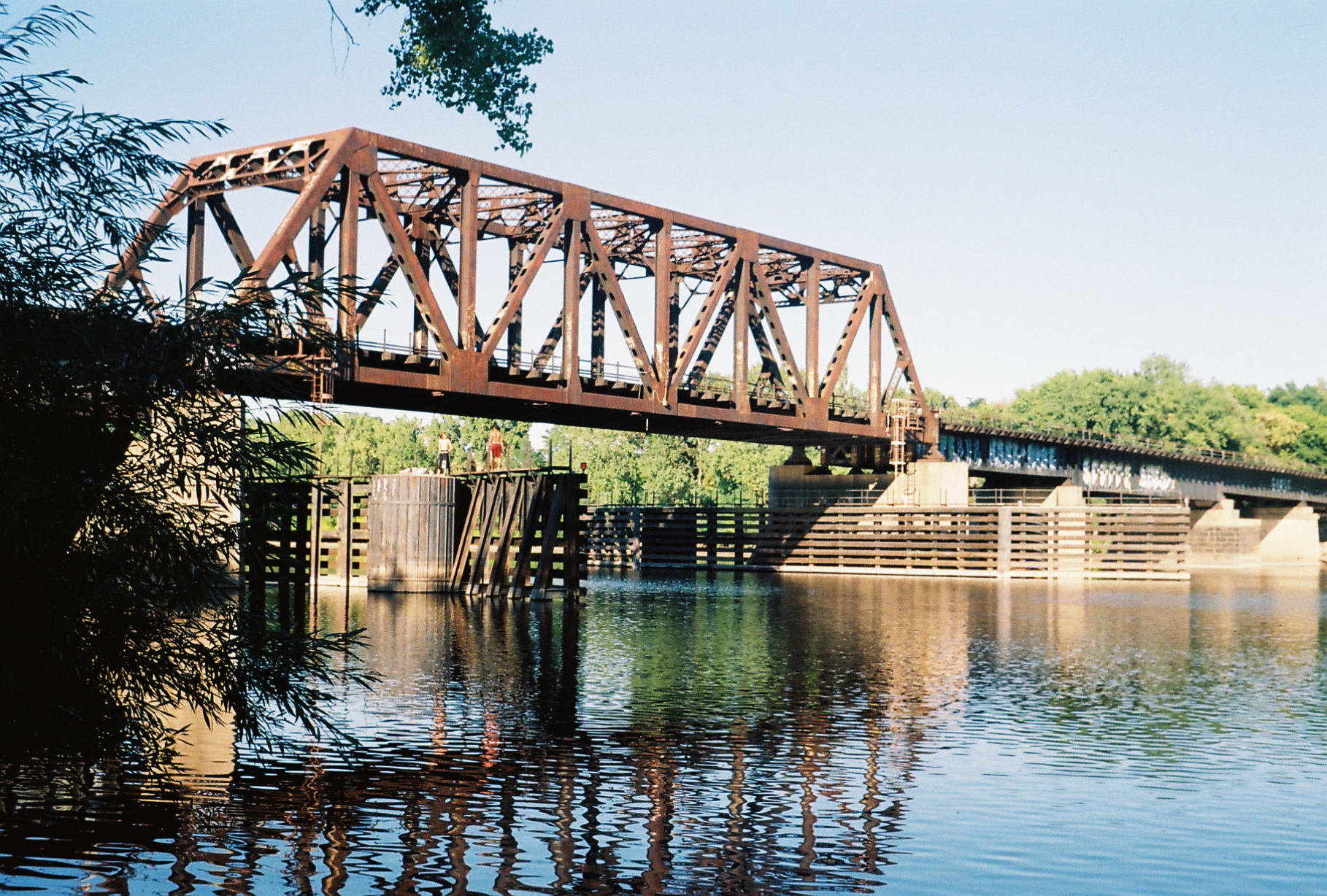
- Coordinates: 45°00′16″N 93°16′28″W
- Carries: One track of the BNSF Railway
- Crosses: Mississippi River
- Locale: Minneapolis, Minnesota
- Maintained by: BNSF Railway
- ID number: 12.1

Characteristics
- Design: Seven plate girder spans and one through-truss span
- Total length: 821 feet (250 m)
- Width: Two tracks
- Longest span: 192 feet (59 m)
- Clearance below: 27 feet (8.2 m)

History
- Opened: 1884

Northern Pacific-BNSF Minneapolis Rail Bridge is a combination plate girder bridge and truss bridge that spans the Mississippi River in Minneapolis, Minnesota.

It was built in 1884 by the Northern Pacific Railway. The bridge was originally built in 1884 with five through-trusses. In 1927, it was renovated with nine plate-girder spans. In 1963, to provide upstream river navigation, two girder spans and three regular piers were removed to make room for a Warren truss span over the main channel, set on two heavier piers. This work took almost two years.

The bridge was originally built to provide access to Northern Pacific's yards just north of downtown Minneapolis. By the 1980s the yards were mostly gone, but the bridge remains as a link to industries located north of downtown that still require rail service by Northern Pacific successor BNSF.

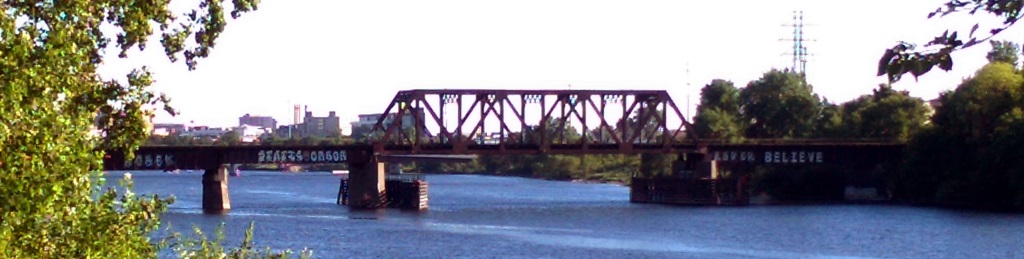
River span with center truss looking South, Minneapolis, MN

== See also ==
- List of crossings of the Upper Mississippi River
