= Robert Street Bridge =

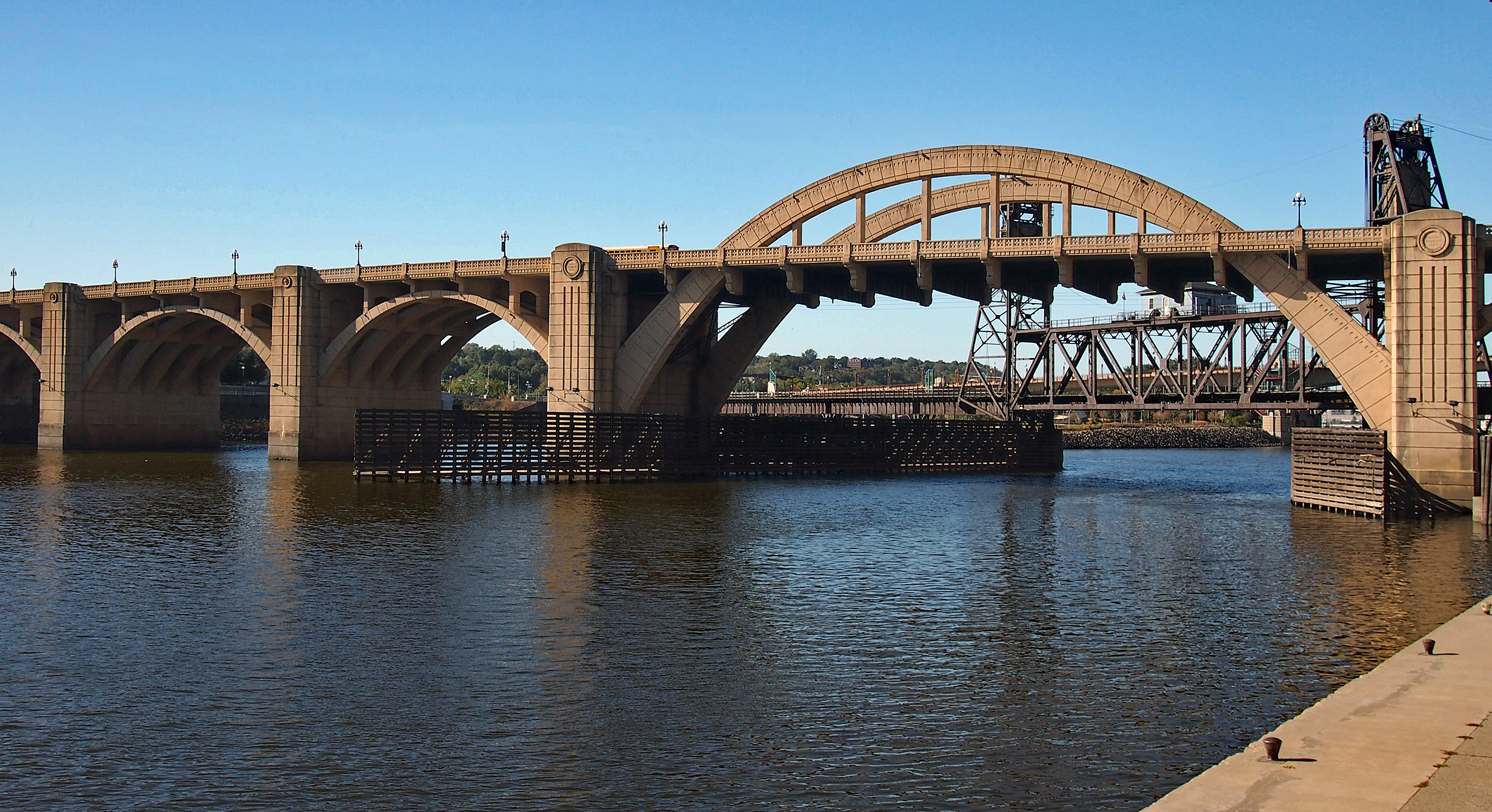
- The main spans of the Robert Street Bridge from the north
- Coordinates: 44°56′38.13″N 93°05′14.65″W
- Carries: Two lanes of MN 3
- Crosses: Mississippi River
- Locale: St. Paul, Minnesota
- Official name: Robert Street Bridge

Characteristics
- Design: Reinforced concrete multiple-arch
- Total length: 1,534.4 feet (467.7 meters)
- Width: 78.5 feet (23.9 meters)
- Longest span: 264 feet (80 meters)
- Clearance below: 62 feet (19 meters)

History
- Opened: 1926

The Robert Street Bridge is a reinforced concrete multiple-arch bridge that spans the Mississippi River in downtown Saint Paul, Minnesota, United States. The bridge is notable for its complex design that was required to accommodate river traffic, the St. Paul Union Pacific Vertical-lift Rail Bridge crossing underneath it at an angle, and roadways on the downtown side of St. Paul. The bridge is also notable for a monumental reinforced concrete rainbow arch. The rainbow arch not only provides 62 feet of headroom above the river, but also provides a strong aesthetic focus. It was built in 1924–1926 by Fegles Construction Company, Ltd. and designed by Toltz, King & Day. The bridge was added to the National Register of Historic Places in 1989. The bridge as well as Robert Street itself are named after Captain Louis Roberts, a notable French Canadian river boat captain, businessman and early settler of Saint Paul, MN.

The bridge was commissioned in the early 1920s to replace a wrought-iron span, originally built in 1884–1885, that had become obsolete due to increasing traffic. The engineers who designed the bridge had several obstacles to work around. The tracks of the Chicago, St. Paul, Minneapolis and Omaha Railway, St. Paul Union Depot, and the Chicago Great Western Railway mainline were factors. The engineers also had to provide adequate clearance above the river, as defined by the United States War Department at the time. Finally, the bridge had to clear Second Street in downtown St. Paul and work through a busy manufacturing district at the south end. The location of nearly every pier was dictated by these requirements. As a result, the bridge was designed with a combination of barrel-arch and rib-arch flanking spans and a rainbow arch for the central span.

One of the members of the crew building the bridge was Warren Burger, future Chief Justice of the United States.

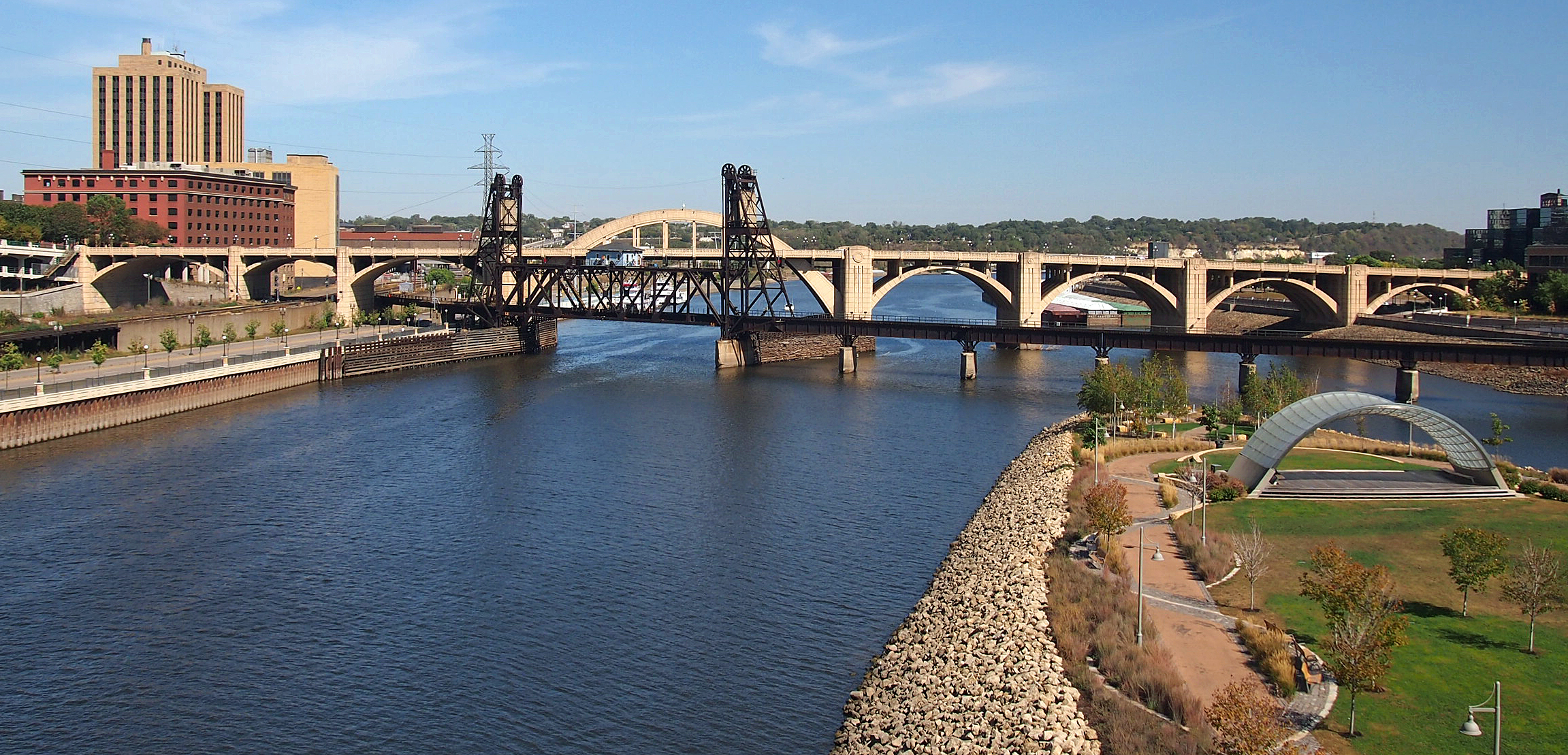
Full-width view from the east of the Robert Street Bridge with the rail bridge crossing it at an angle

== See also ==
- List of crossings of the Upper Mississippi River
- National Register of Historic Places listings in Ramsey County, Minnesota
