= Sauk Rapids Bridge =

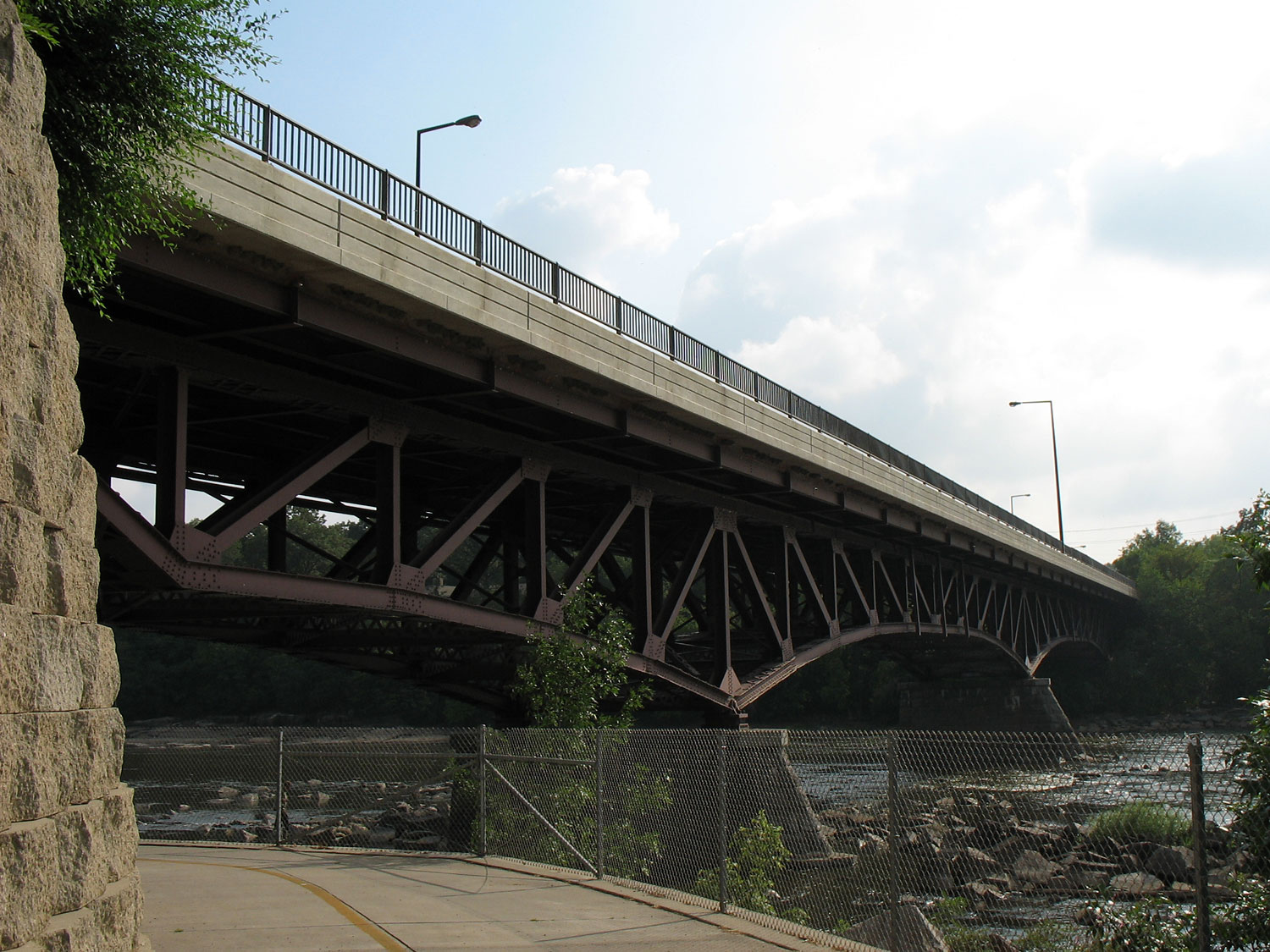
- The Sauk Rapids Bridge, as viewed from the east bank of the Mississippi River, north of the bridge
- Coordinates: 45°35′11″N 94°10′10″W
- Carries: Two lanes connecting First Street South, Sauk Rapids, MN and Ninth Avenue North, St. Cloud, MN (previously Minnesota State Highway 152 and Minnesota State Highway 15), pedestrians
- Crosses: Mississippi River
- Locale: Sauk Rapids, Minnesota
- Maintained by: Minnesota Department of Transportation
- ID number: 5947

Characteristics
- Design: Three-span steel spandrel braced arch bridge
- Total length: 565 feet
- Width: 38 feet
- Longest span: 175 feet
- Clearance below: 12 feet

History
- Opened: 1942
- Closed: 2007

The Sauk Rapids Bridge was a steel spandrel braced arch bridge that spanned the Mississippi River between the cities of St. Cloud and Sauk Rapids in the U.S. state of Minnesota. It was built in 1942 and was designed by the Minnesota Department of Transportation. The bridge consisted of three spans supported by two piers. It crossed the Mississippi River one-half mile (0.8 km) downstream from the rapids of the Sauk River. The river is still rough and fast-flowing at this location.

With the opening of the new Sauk Rapids Regional Bridge, located a short distance upstream, on October 23, 2007, the Sauk Rapids Bridge had been closed to all traffic.

After the collapse of the I-35W Mississippi River bridge in Minneapolis on August 1, 2007, Minnesota Governor Tim Pawlenty ordered the Sauk Rapids Bridge and two other bridges in Minnesota to be inspected. The three bridges have a design similar to that of the former I-35W bridge.

The bridge was inspected on August 4 and found to be structurally sound.

As of March 2008, the bridge had been completely dismantled.

== See also ==
- Sauk Rapids Regional Bridge
- List of crossings of the Upper Mississippi River
