= Highway 25 Bridge (Minnesota) =

Bridge in Minnesota, United States

Monticello Highway Bridge
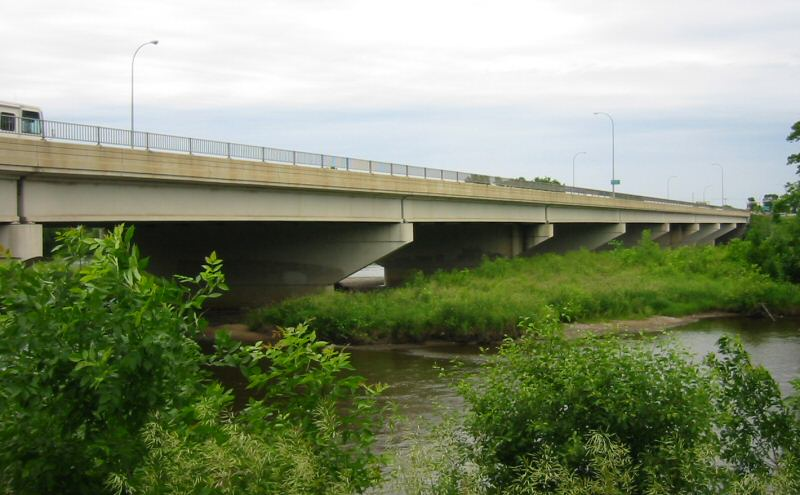
- Coordinates: 45°18′31″N 93°47′29″W
- Carries: Four lanes of MN 25
- Crosses: Mississippi River
- Locale: Monticello, Minnesota
- Maintained by: Minnesota Department of Transportation
- ID number: 71012

Characteristics
- Design: Concrete girder bridge
- Total length: 1007 feet
- Width: 68 feet
- Longest span: 111 feet
- Clearance below: 24 feet

History
- Opened: 1988

Location
- Interactive map of Monticello Highway Bridge

Highway 25 Bridge is a concrete girder bridge that spans the Mississippi River between Monticello, Minnesota and Big Lake, Minnesota. It was built in 1988 by the Minnesota Department of Transportation and was designed by VanDoren Hazard Stallings.

The previous bridge in this location, built in 1930, was a humpback truss bridge with a decorative wrought iron railing. One unique feature about the 1930 bridge was that it had restrooms built into the bridge, underneath the sidewalk in the southwest corner next to the bridge abutment. The restrooms were closed in 1962 when it was determined that they could not easily be connected to the new sewage treatment plant. Replacement restrooms were built in the nearby park.

The first bridge built at Monticello over the Mississippi River was completed in 1893. It was a wooden swing-span bridge, which could swing to allow river vessels to pass along the river.

== See also ==
- List of crossings of the Upper Mississippi River
