= Sabula Rail Bridge =

Bridge in United States of America

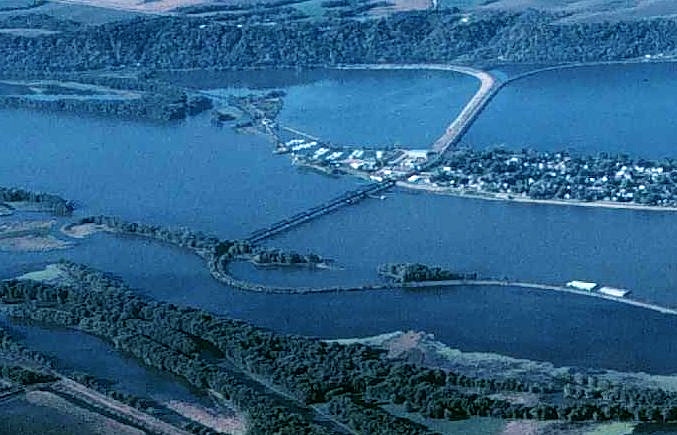
- Rail Bridge and Sabula, Iowa
- Coordinates: 42°03′51″N 90°09′58″W
- Carries: Single railroad track
- Crosses: Mississippi River
- Locale: Sabula, Iowa and Savanna, Illinois

Characteristics
- Design: Steel truss bridge with swing span

Location
- Interactive map of Sabula Rail Bridge

The Sabula Rail Bridge is a swing bridge that carries a single rail line across the Mississippi River between the island town of Sabula, Iowa and Savanna, Illinois. Originally built for the Milwaukee Road, and subsequently owned by the Iowa, Chicago and Eastern Railroad, the bridge is operational and is currently owned by Canadian Pacific Railway.

== 2014 barge accident ==
On April 8, 2014, the Sabula Railway bridge was struck by the Marquette Transportation Barge Wisconsin. No one was injured. The Sabula Fire Department was called alongside the Sabula ambulance crew to search for a missing bargeman, but he was later found on the barge unharmed. The protective wooden barrier was almost completely destroyed by the barge. The incident as of the day of the accident was investigated by the U.S. Coast Guard and Canadian Pacific Railway Police, with the assistance of the Sabula Fire Department, who provided their rescue boat as transportation until additional boats arrived. As of 2015, the bridge has been completely repaired.

== See also ==
- List of crossings of the Upper Mississippi River
