= Louisiana Railroad Bridge =

Bridge between Illinois and Missouri, U.S.

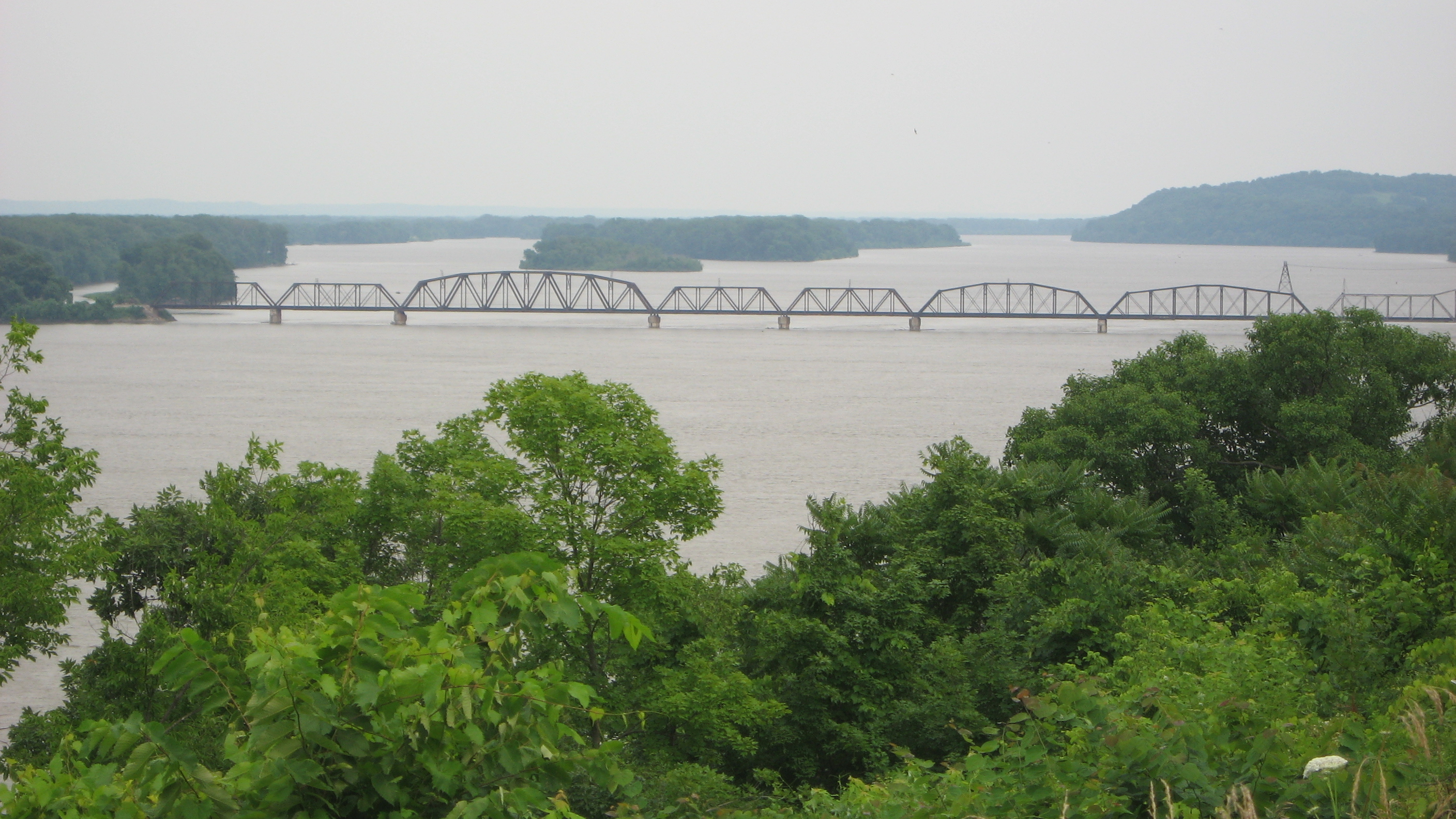
- Coordinates: 39°26′43″N 91°02′01″W
- Carries: Single track rail line
- Crosses: Mississippi River
- Locale: Louisiana, Missouri and Illinois

Characteristics
- Design: Truss bridge

History
- Opened: 1873

Location
- Interactive map of Louisiana Railroad Bridge

The Louisiana Railroad Bridge carries a single track rail line across the Mississippi River between Louisiana, Missouri and Pike County, Illinois, United States. Built by the Chicago and Alton Railroad, the structure is currently owned by the Canadian Pacific Kansas City following a series of sales and consolidation in the railroad industry.

== History ==
A predecessor of this bridge was opened for service in 1873 as one of the first 15 bridges across the Mississippi River. The current structure opened to traffic in 1898, having been fully reconstructed on the original piers from the 1873 bridge. When it opened, the 444-foot swing span was the longest swing span in the nation.

== Appearance ==
The bridge's distinctive appearance is derived from the variety of truss types installed as different spans were replaced over time. The most recent span replacement occurred in 1945, when three new spans were installed.

In its closed position, the bridge provides a vertical clearance of 15.8 feet above the normal pool for this section of the Mississippi River.

== See also ==
- List of crossings of the Upper Mississippi River
- List of bridges in the United States
