= Lowry Avenue Bridge =

Tied-arch bridge that crosses the Mississippi River in Minneapolis

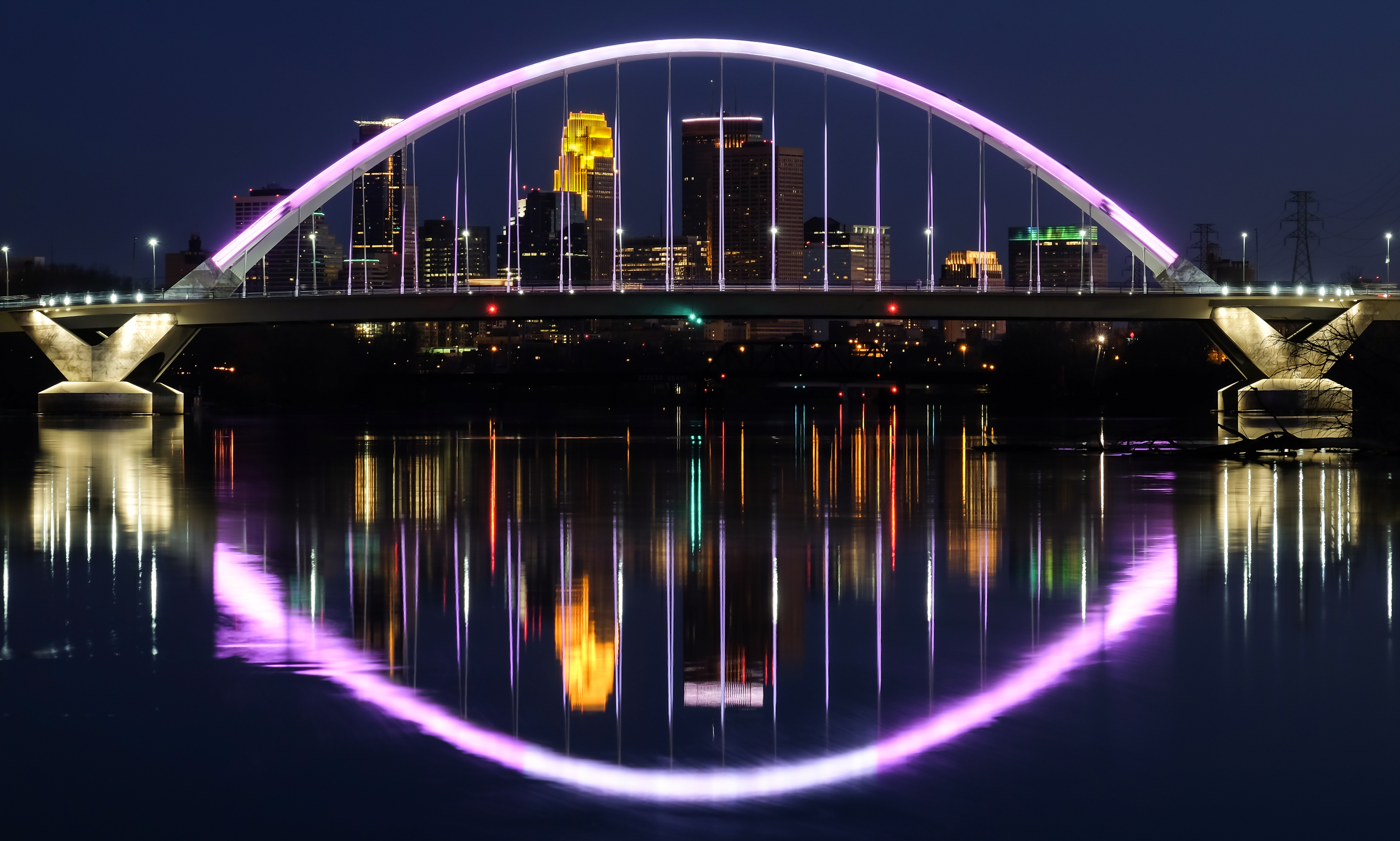
- The new bridge, completed in 2012 and pictured in 2015
- Coordinates: 45°00′47″N 93°16′28″W
- Carries: Four lanes of CSAH 153 (Lowry Avenue North)
- Crosses: Mississippi River
- Locale: Minneapolis, Minnesota
- Maintained by: Hennepin County, Minnesota
- ID number: 27B60

Characteristics
- Design: Basket handle tied-arch bridge, steel
- Total length: 1,576 feet (480 m)
- Width: 107 feet (33 m)
- Longest span: 450 feet (137 m)
- Clearance below: 37 feet (11 m)

History
- Opened: October 2012

Lowry Avenue Bridge
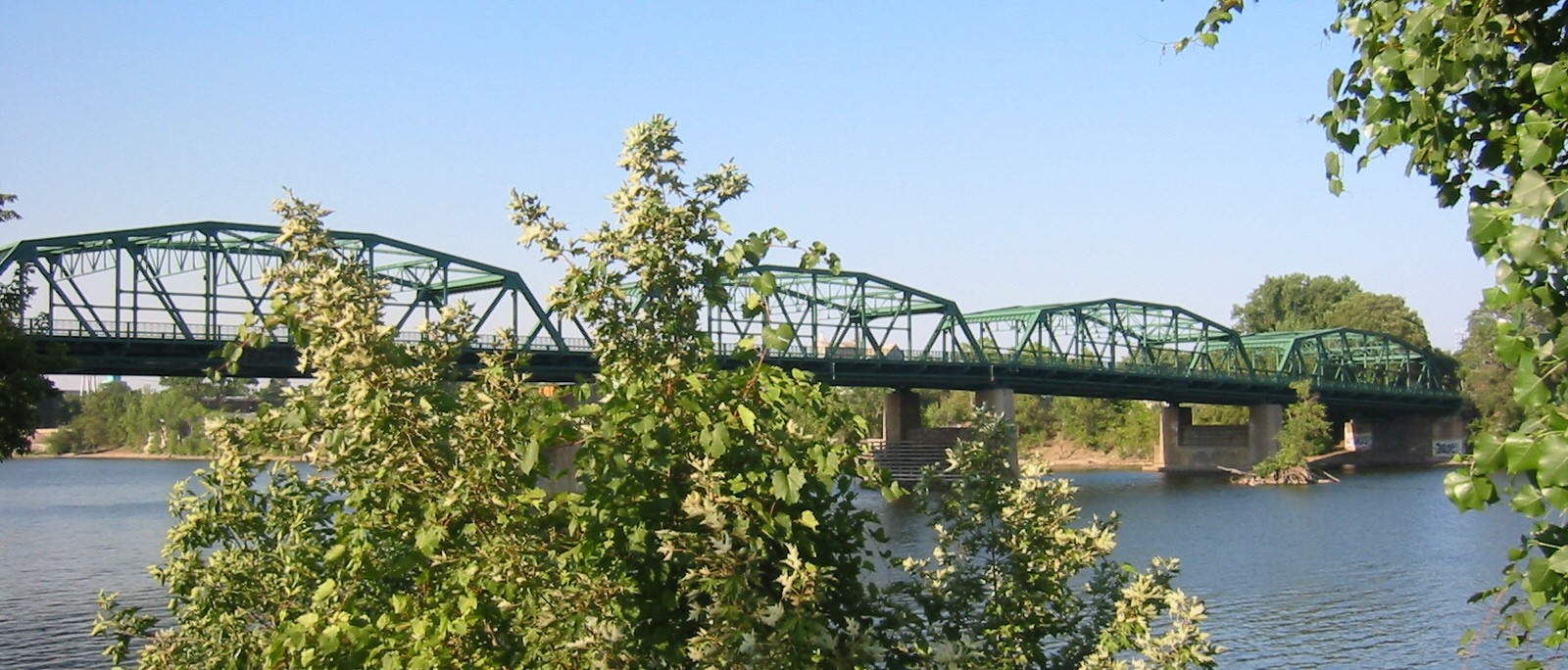
- A view of the 1958 bridge from the west bank of the Mississippi south of the bridge, showing four of the five truss spans.
- Coordinates: 45°00′47″N 93°16′28″W
- Carries: Two lanes of CSAH 153 (Lowry Avenue North)
- Crosses: Mississippi River
- Locale: Minneapolis, Minnesota
- Maintained by: Hennepin County, Minnesota
- ID number: 2723(726)

Characteristics
- Design: Truss bridge
- Total length: 889 feet
- Width: 57.2 feet
- Longest span: 143 feet
- Clearance below: 33 feet

History
- Opened: 1905; remodeled in 1958, 2006
- Closed: 2008 (demolished 2009)

Statistics
- Daily traffic: 16,600 (2001)

The Lowry Avenue Bridge is a steel tied-arch bridge over the Mississippi River in Minneapolis, Minnesota, completed in October 2012.

== History ==
The original structure was built in 1905 and utilized a 5-span truss bridge design. This bridge lasted 51 years until it became too weak to carry traffic.

In 1958, five new truss spans were built in this location, using the same piers but raised 20 feet to allow navigation on the upper Mississippi River. This bridge was notable in that it had a steel grid deck where the river was visible directly through the mesh, as opposed to the (currently) more common concrete deck.

Lead-based paint was removed from the bridge during a 2004 repainting effort and the steel grid deck was replaced in 2003. At this time, the bridge was expected to be replaced in the mid-2010s, and community meetings were held in 2007 to choose a design for the new span. However, the timetable to replace the bridge was accelerated as the condition of the 100-year-old piers deteriorated.

During the 2004 repainting, engineers discovered that the pier 3 bearings (east side of navigation channel) had displaced roughly 11 inches east of their original location as a result of unexpected movement of that pier (west) towards the main river channel. Hennepin County contracted with Wiss, Janey, Elstner and Associates (WJE) to investigate and report on the cause and extent of damage. The consultant's report concluded that evidence suggested the pier underwent many years, perhaps 50, of creep deflection due to sustained lateral earth pressure at the foundation which was held in check by the bearing assemblies. The bearing assemblies ultimate strength was finally overcome sometime in 2004 which allowed the unrestrained and rapid movement of the pier. The structural engineers at WJE were unable to predict the magnitude of future pier displacements.

Hennepin County, which owns and maintains the bridge, closed the bridge at 10:00 AM on April 25, 2008, due to safety concerns. Controlled explosions were used to demolish the bridge spans 14 months later on the morning of June 21, 2009.

Construction of the $80 million replacement bridge began early 2010 and was opened for traffic on October 27, 2012, at a cost of $104 million. The bridge includes a protected, 12-foot (3.7 m) shared-use path on both sides for pedestrians and bikes.

== See also ==
- List of crossings of the Upper Mississippi River
