= Sauk Rapids Regional Bridge =

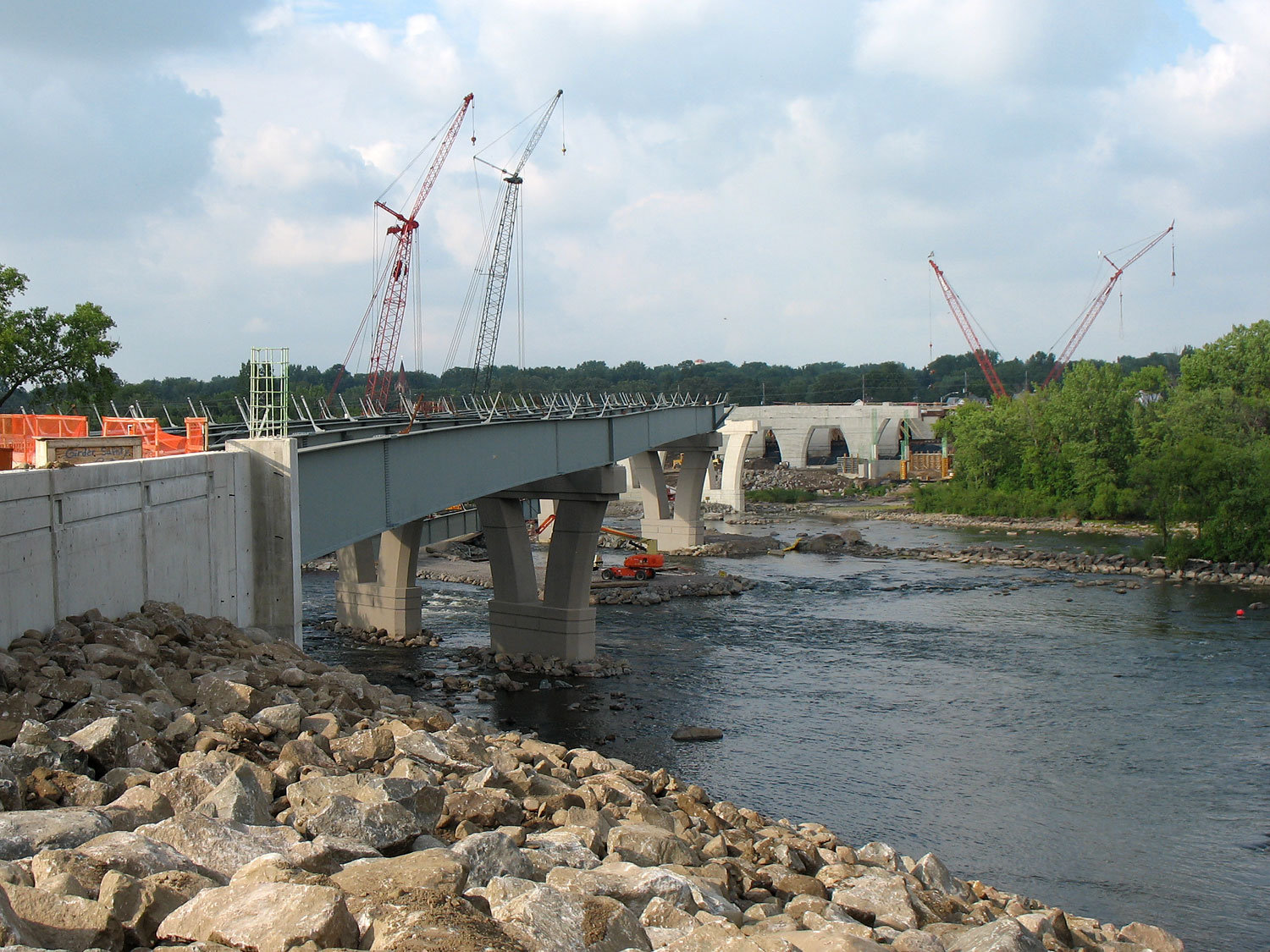
- Construction of the Sauk Rapids Regional Bridge as of August 18, 2006, shown from the west bank of Mississippi River, south of the bridge.
- Coordinates: 45°35′17″N 94°10′12″W
- Carries: Four lanes connecting Second Street North (Benton CSAH 3), Sauk Rapids, MN and Ninth Avenue North, St. Cloud, MN, pedestrians
- Crosses: Mississippi River, BNSF Railway
- Locale: Sauk Rapids, Minnesota
- Official name: Sauk Rapids Regional Bridge
- Maintained by: Stearns County, City of Sauk Rapids
- ID number: 05534

Characteristics
- Design: Plate girder bridge

History
- Opened: October 23, 2007

The Sauk Rapids Regional Bridge is a bridge spanning the Mississippi River in the U. S. city of Sauk Rapids, Minnesota. Construction began on September 26, 2005; the bridge was completed in September 2007 and opened to traffic on October 23, 2007. The official dedication and ribbon-cutting ceremony took place on November 16, 2007. The bridge replaced the former Sauk Rapids Bridge, located a short distance downriver, which was demolished in the fall and winter of 2007-2008.

The new bridge spans the BNSF Railway on the east bank of the river. Traffic flow is no longer disrupted during train crossings; this was a frequent problem with the former bridge.

The new span relied heavily on steel for its construction rather than concrete to reduce the number of piers needed to be placed in the river. This design choice increased the project cost by $2.3 million USD to a total cost estimated at $56.63 million. Construction of the bridge of itself cost an estimated $20.46 million, with other costs including right-of-way purchases, road construction, and a program to help businesses affected by the project relocate elsewhere in downtown Sauk Rapids.

The entire project was large in scope, due to the amount of business and residential properties that were affected by its chosen location. When the Sauk Rapids Bridge project began, it was considered to be the first downtown transportation project of its kind nationwide in terms of the scale of relocations of businesses that were necessary. The success of the project may set a precedent for future bridges.

The original design of the bridge was hotly contested between Benton County and the City of Sauk Rapids, and the dispute was nearly taken to court. The county had wished that the bridge land beyond Benton Drive (Sauk Rapids' "main street") on Second Avenue and connect with Second Street North. The city feared that such a design would adversely affect businesses in the downtown area and desired instead that the bridge land on Benton Drive. Benton County's stake in the project (Stearns County being the other contributor) was eventually handed over to the city, and it was elected that the bridge pass over the BNSF Railway, land on Benton Drive, and connect with Second Street North.

The Sauk Rapids Regional Bridge features a spiral walkway on the Sauk Rapids side of the bridge that allows pedestrians to access the city parking lot under the bridge.

== See also ==
- Sauk Rapids Bridge
- List of crossings of the Upper Mississippi River
