= University Bridge (St. Cloud) =

- Coordinates: 45°32′56.5″N 94°08′51″W
- Carries: University Drive
- Crosses: Mississippi River
- Locale: Saint Cloud, Minnesota
- Maintained by: City of St. Cloud
- ID number: 73540

Characteristics
- Design: Concrete girder bridge
- Total length: 1171 feet
- Width: 65 feet
- Longest span: 169 feet
- Clearance below: 20 feet

History
- Opened: 1985

University Bridge is a concrete girder bridge that spans the Mississippi River in Saint Cloud, Minnesota. Built in 1985, and designed by Howard Needles Tammen & Bergendoff, it is the second-newest bridge in St. Cloud, after Granite City Crossing. It is named for its proximity to St. Cloud State University. To accommodate bikers and walkers, the bridge has an approach ramp on one side and steps on the other side. For decoration, a scrollwork pattern is cut into the approach walls' concrete, and the piers are a curved "V" shape.

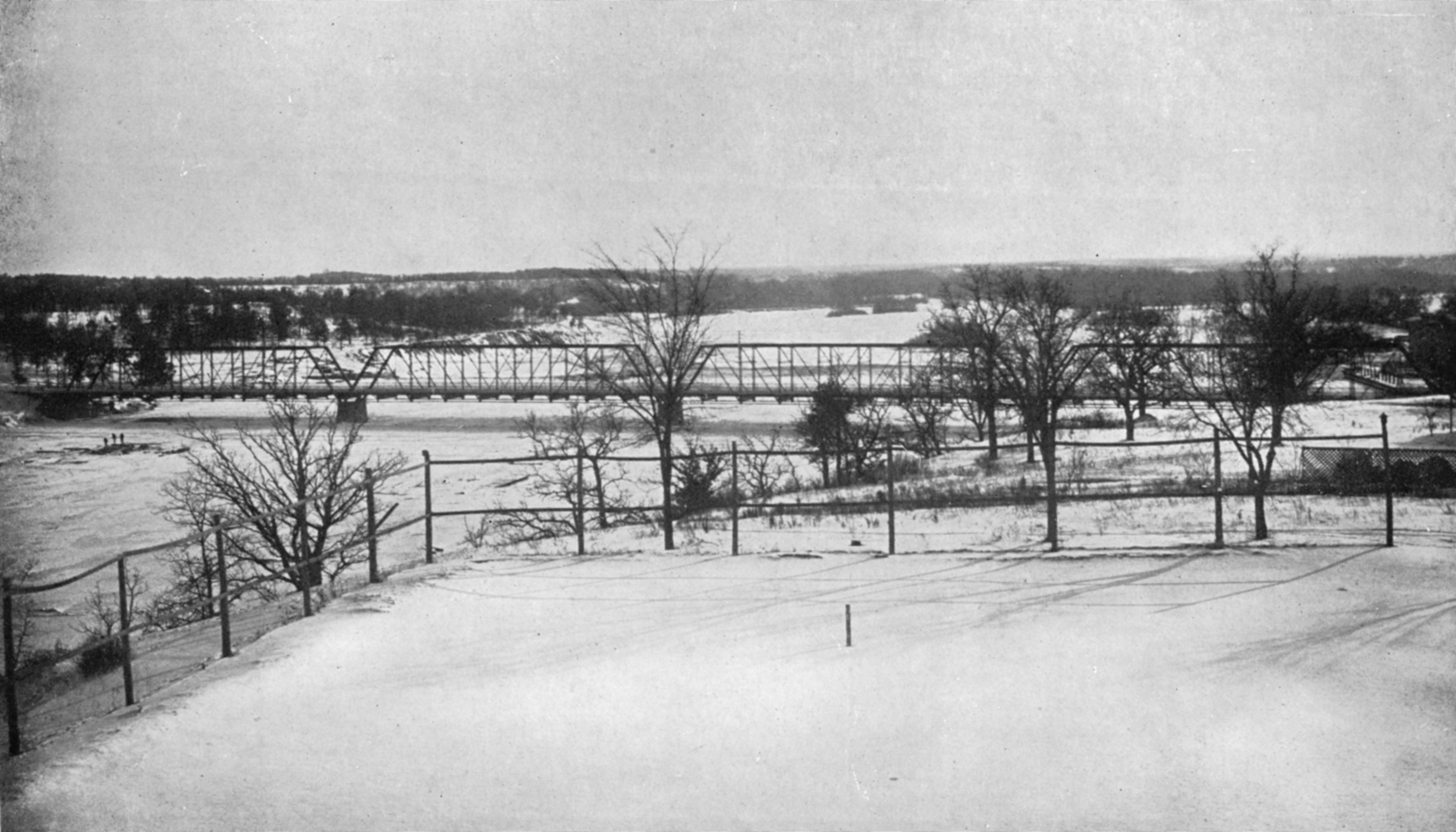
Tenth Street bridge in winter, St. Cloud, Minnesota, 1922

The previous bridge at this structure, built in 1892, was a through-truss bridge.

== See also ==
- List of crossings of the Upper Mississippi River
