= Nature Road Bridge =

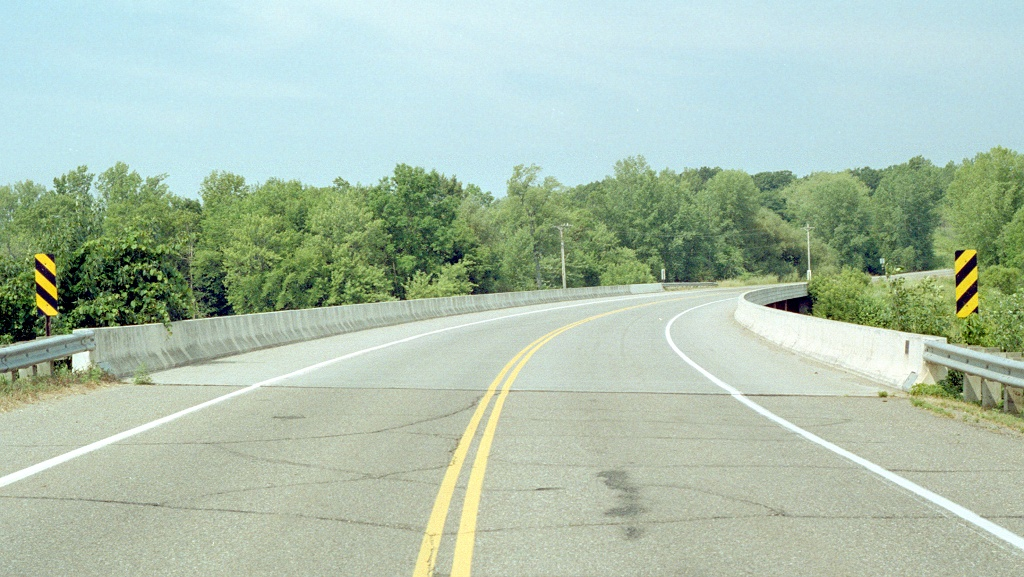
- Coordinates: 45.8256°N 94.3568°W
- Carries: Morrison County Road 26 (Nature Road)
- Crosses: Mississippi River
- Maintained by: Morrison County, Minnesota

Characteristics
- Design: concrete girder bridge

Statistics
- Daily traffic: 2350

Location
- Interactive map of Nature Road Bridge

The Nature Road Bridge is a bridge that crosses the Mississippi River in the U.S. state of Minnesota.

== See also ==
- List of crossings of the Upper Mississippi River
