= Parrish Avenue Bridge =

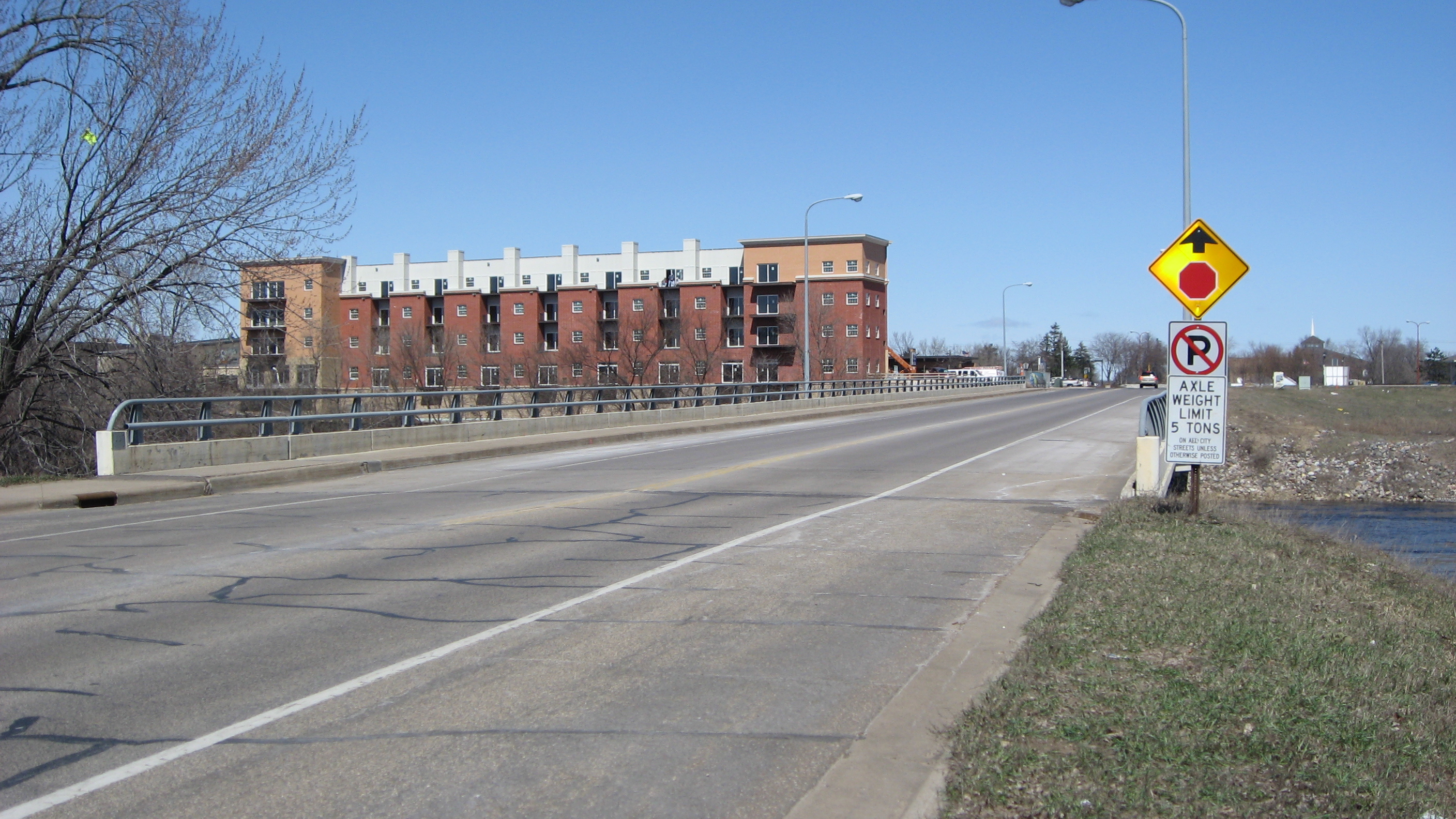
- Coordinates: 45°18′06″N 93°33′56″W
- Carries: Two lanes of County Road 42
- Crosses: Mississippi River
- Locale: Elk River, Minnesota
- Maintained by: Minnesota Department of Transportation
- ID number: 86515

Characteristics
- Design: Concrete girder bridge
- Total length: 450 feet
- Width: 46 feet
- Longest span: 112 feet
- Clearance below: 13.8 feet

History
- Opened: 1985

Statistics
- Daily traffic: 7200

The Parrish Avenue Bridge is a concrete girder bridge that spans the Mississippi River between Otsego, Minnesota and Elk River, Minnesota. It was built in 1985 and was designed by Toltz, King, Duval and Anderson.

The previous bridge in this location, built in 1906, was designed by C.A.P. Turner's engineering firm. Since it could not be determined that C.A.P. Turner himself had designed the bridge, however, the old bridge was not saved or included on the National Register of Historic Places. Despite the historic nature of the old bridge, it had deteriorated to the point where it had to be demolished in 1984.

== See also ==
- List of crossings of the Upper Mississippi River
