= Wabash Bridge =

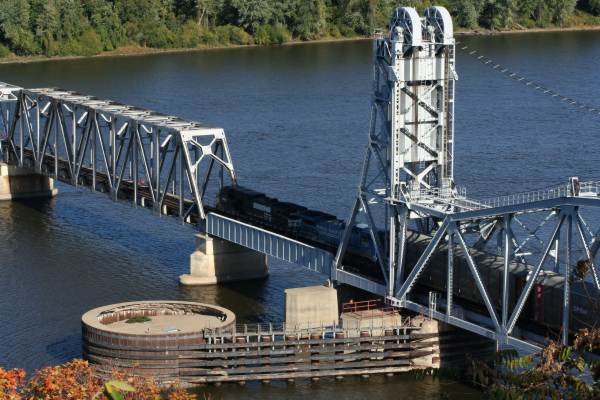
- The Wabash Bridge looking southeast
- Coordinates: 39°43′27″N 91°21′44″W
- Carries: Norfolk Southern Railway
- Crosses: Mississippi River
- Locale: Hannibal, Missouri and Pike County, Illinois
- Maintained by: Norfolk Southern Railway

Characteristics
- Design: 5 Truss spans with Vertical lift over main channel
- Longest span: 409 feet (125 m)

Rail characteristics
- No. of tracks: 1

Statistics
- Daily traffic: 11.0 trains per day (as of 2014)

Location
- Interactive map of Wabash Bridge

The Wabash Bridge carries one railroad track across the Mississippi River between Hannibal, Missouri, and Pike County, Illinois. Built by the Wabash Railroad, the bridge is today owned by the Norfolk Southern Railway.

== History ==
On May 3, 1982, the towboat Northern King lost power in one engine while pushing 12 grain-filled barges in heavy currents. The craft struck a 250-foot (76 m) truss span, which collapsed into the river, entangling the tug and several barges and halting river traffic for nine hours. Three barges broke loose and drifted downstream, missing Mark Twain Memorial Bridge. The bridge, then owned by Norfolk and Western Railway, predecessor of the current owner, was repaired.

Built as a swing span, the bridge was converted in 1994 to a vertical lift bridge to increase the width of the navigational channel. The vertical lift span was taken from the former Florence Bridge spanning the Tennessee River in Florence, Alabama. To minimize the effect on river traffic, the new span was installed over the course of three days.

Before the Mark Twain Memorial Bridge opened in 1936, the Wabash Bridge was also a toll bridge carrying U.S. Route 36 across the river.

== Gallery ==
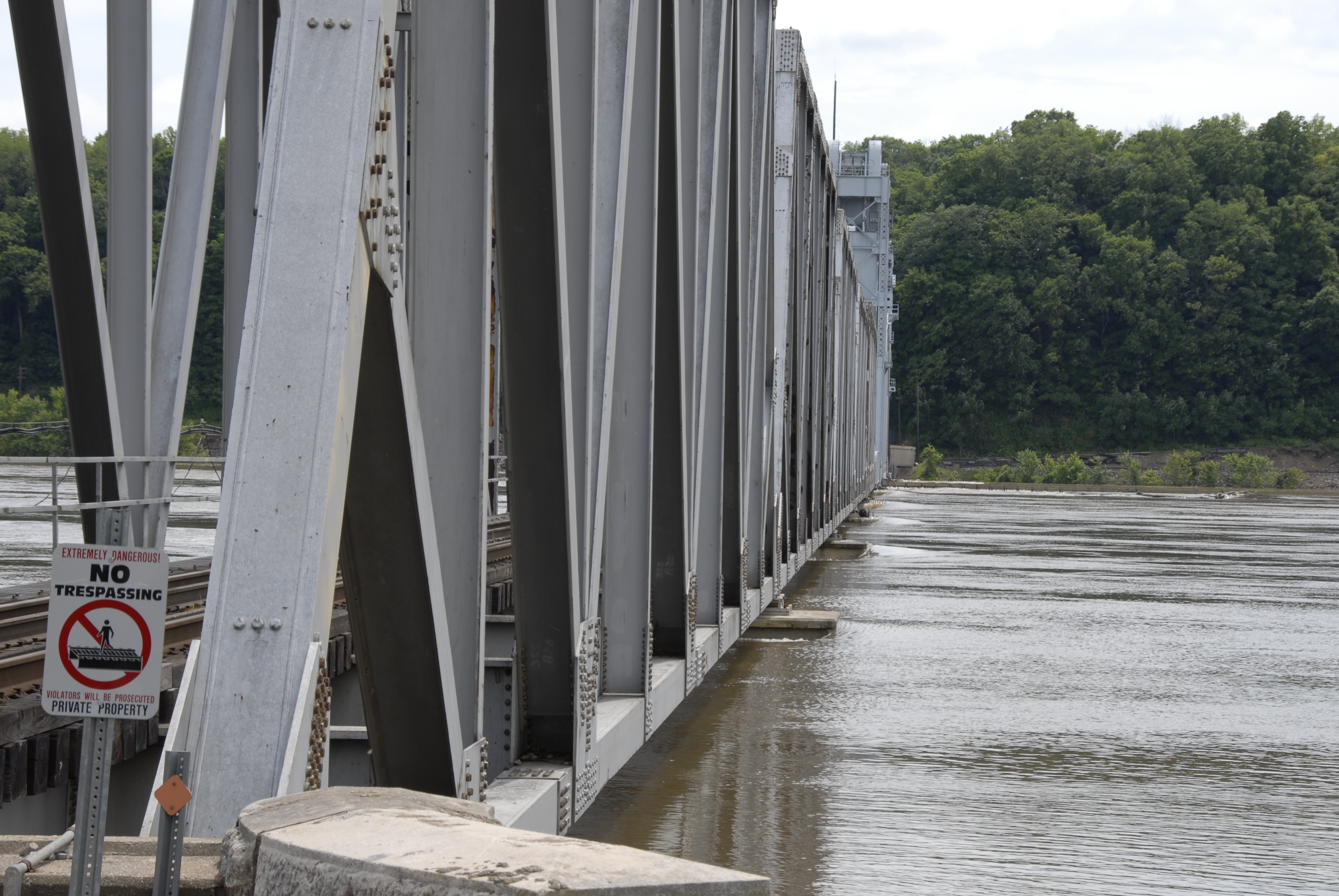
Bridge during June 2008 Midwest floods. Normally, there is about 20 feet clearance below the bridge.

== See also ==
- List of crossings of the Upper Mississippi River
