= Pile–Pontoon Railroad Bridge =

Historic Bridge on the Mississippi River

Coordinates: 43°02′43″N 91°10′32″W

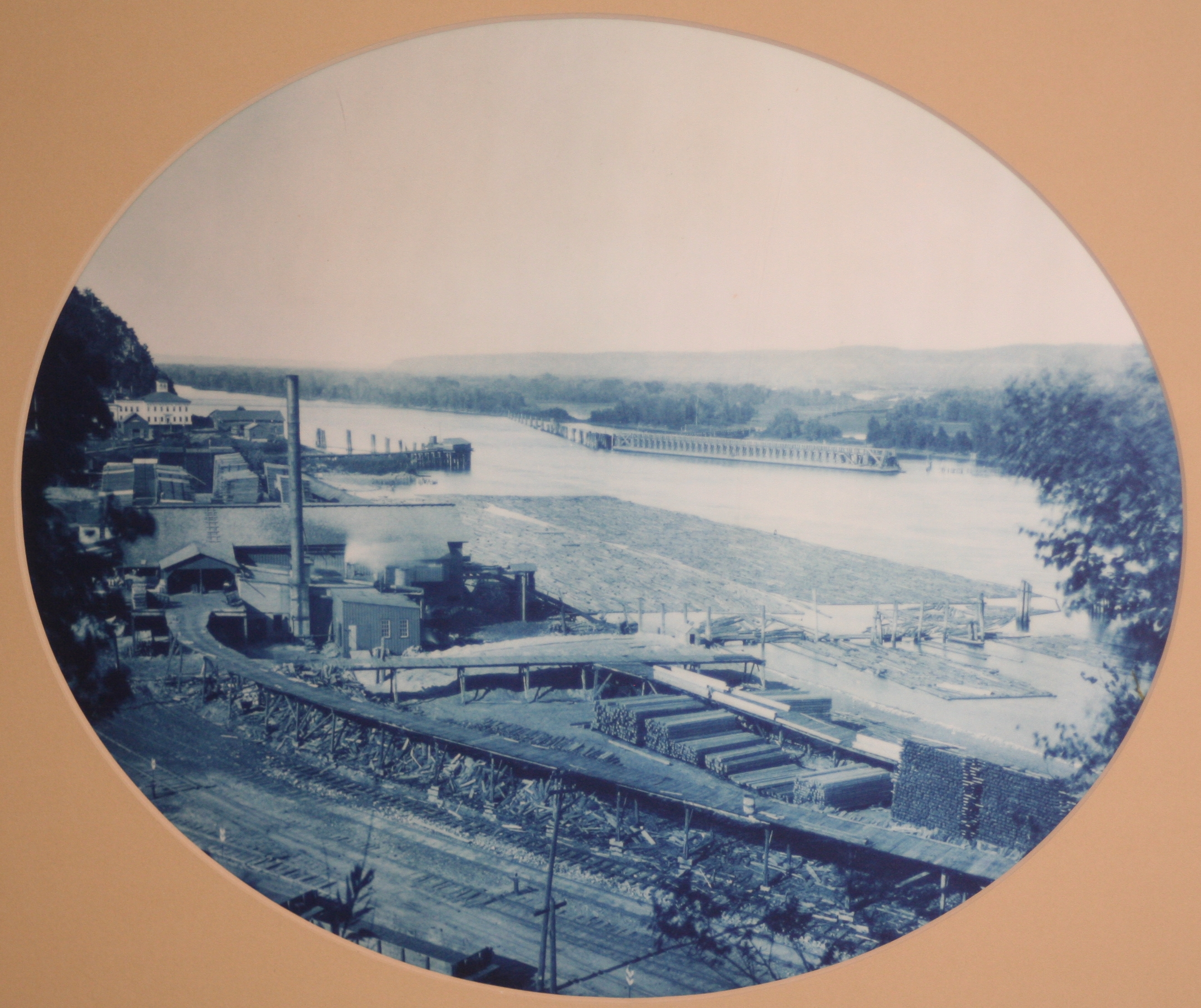
Old Pontoon Bridge, North McGregor, Iowa 1885

The Pile–Pontoon Railroad Bridge was a floating bridge that crossed the Mississippi River in northern Iowa.

From 1857 Marquette, Iowa, became a major hub on the Chicago, Milwaukee and St. Paul Railway, as grain from throughout Iowa and Minnesota was sent through the city en route to Lake Michigan. A permanent bridge between Marquette and Prairie du Chien, Wisconsin was thought impractical, in part due to substantial river traffic which would have required clear spans high above the water.

Goods were initially transported by boat across the river, which required unloading and reloading of railroad cars. In the late 1860s, the Milwaukee Road's agent John Lawler conceived a ferry crossing, using barges with rail tracks on their decks. Because there are two channels separated by an island, each channel required a barge which was pulled across by cables, and a small rail yard crossing the island connecting the two ferries. This allowed transshipment of railroad cars without unloading, but was still less than efficient.

A better solution was found by Michael Spettel and Lawler, who patented a permanent pontoon bridge system to span the river in 1874. This comprised piled trestles built out into the river, and two pontoons: A 210-foot (64 m) unit on the east channel, and a 227-foot (69 m) unit on the west. Each pontoon was hinged at one end to allow it to float open, and was pulled closed by a steam-powered cable. As well as allowing for river traffic, this allowed end-of-winter ice floes to pass down the river without risk of damaging the structure.

The pontoons were built with a timber-framed deck which could be raised or lowered by as much as 18 feet (5.5 m) to allow for changes in the river level, which can vary by as much as 22.5 feet (6.9 m) (at extreme high water, the bridge could not be used). Adjusting and supporting the deck with timber blocks was a laborious process requiring much manual work. At each end, a short, ramped length of steel span was provided, carrying the track onto the adjoining trestles. Train speed across the pontoons was limited to 7 miles per hour (11 km/h) .

Prairie du Chien businessman Lawler took most of the credit for this invention, and made a small fortune through its operation. Marquette subsequently became home to a major rail yard, which even as late as 1920 was the busiest in Iowa, employing 400 people.

The original crossing was upgraded with replacement of the eastern pontoon in 1914, and a longer 276-foot (84 m) western pontoon in 1916; the longest in the world at that time. The replacement spans included steam-powered lift machinery to adjust the height of the track deck.

The railroad's significance declined and the last passenger train stopped in Marquette in 1960. The pontoon bridge was disassembled in 1961.

== See also ==
- List of crossings of the Upper Mississippi River
