= Mark Twain Memorial Bridge (1936) =

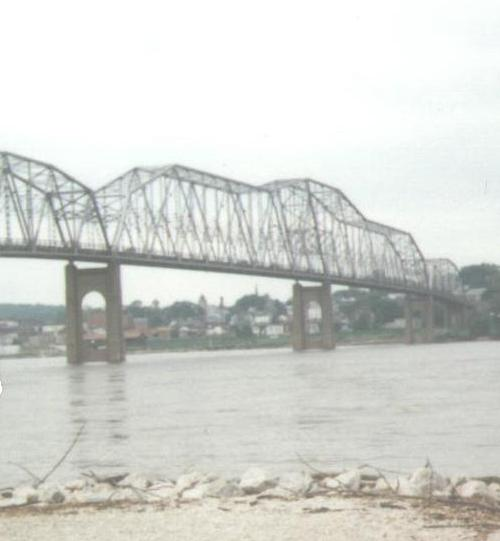
- Coordinates: 39°42′58″N 91°21′10″W
- Carries: US 36
- Crosses: Mississippi River
- Locale: Hannibal, Missouri / Levee Township, Pike County, Illinois

Characteristics
- Design: Continuous truss bridge

History
- Opened: 1936; 89 years ago
- Closed: 2000; 25 years ago

The Mark Twain Memorial Bridge was a cantilevered through truss bridge carrying US 36 over the Mississippi River. It was replaced in 2000 with the extension of I-72 and subsequently demolished.

== History ==
The bridge, which replaced motor vehicle use of the Wabash Bridge, was opened in 1936 by President Franklin D. Roosevelt and entered Missouri at the foot of Cardiff Hill which appeared in Twain's books The Adventures of Tom Sawyer and The Adventures of Huckleberry Finn. A crosswalk crossed the highway, connecting the Twain boyhood home with the lighthouse at the top of the hill. It originally carried the two-lane U.S. Route 36, but with the extension of Interstate 72 west across Missouri, a new bridge was needed and was built to the north of the original bridge. On the Missouri side, the bridge ran into downtown Hannibal, just north of Hill Street. On the Illinois side, the route connected to present-day Illinois Route 106 (Old US 36), now served by I-72's Exit 1 to go east to Hull, Pittsfield, and points beyond.

The Mark Twain Bridge was initially a toll bridge.

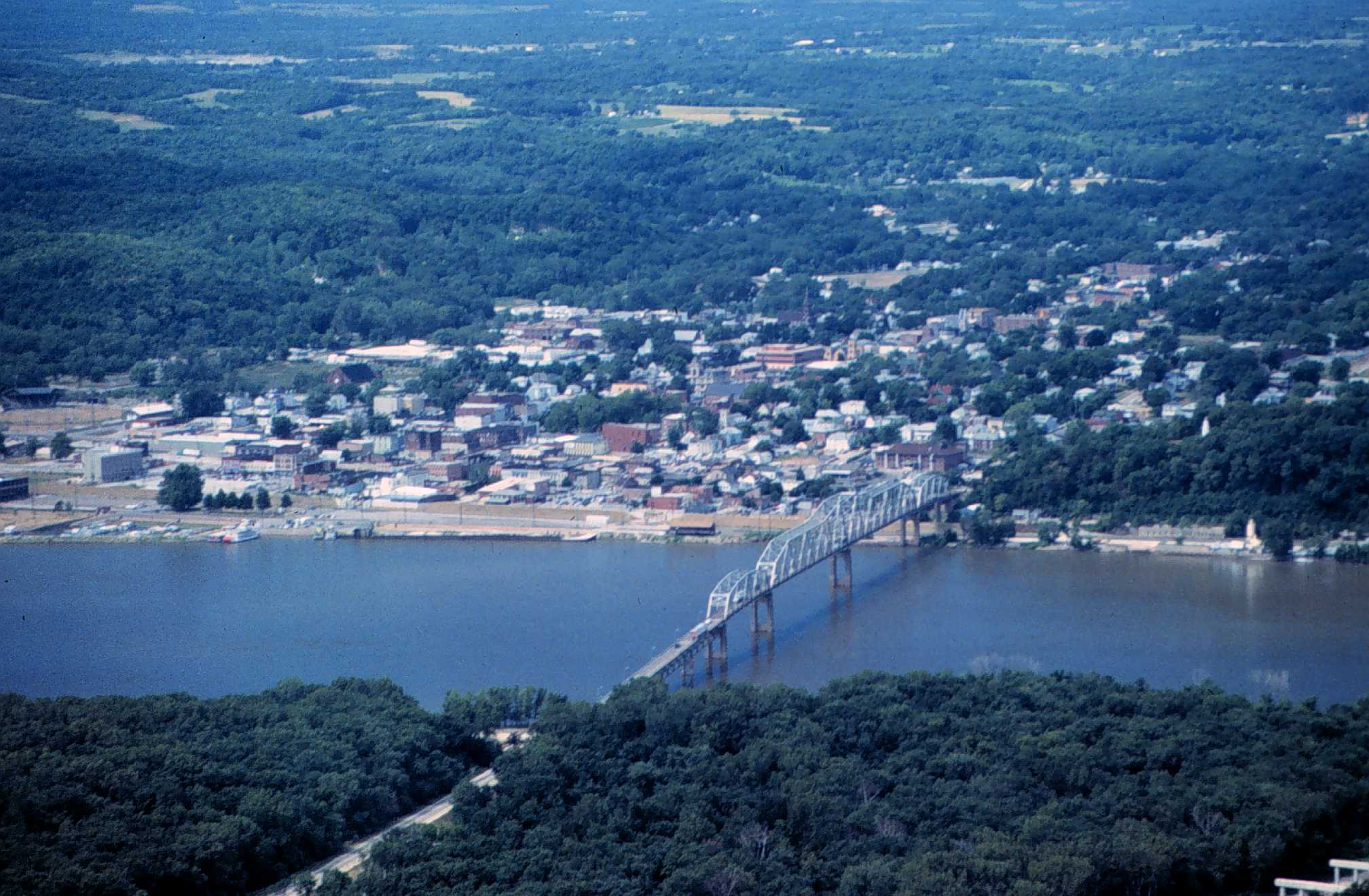
The original Mark Twain Memorial Bridge with Hannibal in the background.

== Replacement ==
In the late 1990s, construction started on a new bridge to carry I-72 west into Hannibal (I-72 turned into I-172 at milepost 4). Increased traffic on the deteriorating, old, narrow bridge was also a contributing factor. After the new bridge opened in 2000, the bridge was demolished. Today, only the western abutment remains with informational signs along the old roadway.

== See also ==
- List of bridges documented by the Historic American Engineering Record in Illinois
- List of bridges documented by the Historic American Engineering Record in Missouri
