= Ohio Township, Mississippi County, Missouri =

Inactive township in Missouri

Coordinates: 36.9319°N 89.1847°W

Ohio Township is an inactive township in Mississippi County, in the U.S. state of Missouri.

Ohio Township was established in 1847, taking its name from the nearby Ohio River.
