= Morse Township, Itasca County, Minnesota =

Morse Township, Minnesota
- Township
- Morse Town Hall

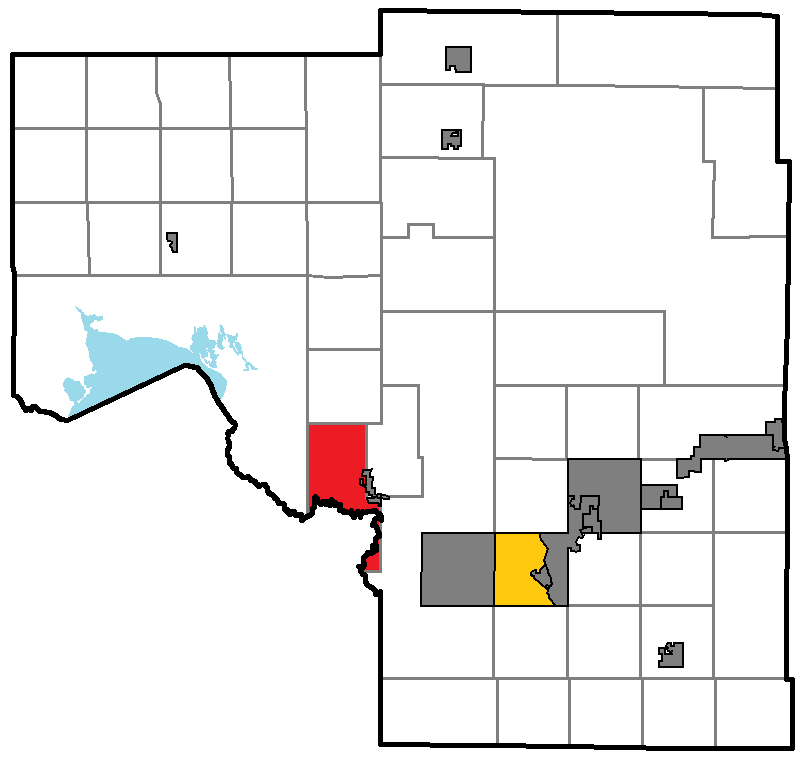
- Location of Morse Township, within Itasca County, Minnesota
- Coordinates: 47°20′14″N 93°50′35″W
- Country: United States
- State: Minnesota
- County: Itasca

Area
  - Total: 37.3 sq mi (96.5 km^{2})
  - Land: 36.4 sq mi (94.2 km^{2})
  - Water: 0.89 sq mi (2.3 km^{2})
- Elevation: 1,299 ft (396 m)

Population (2020)
  - Total: 555
  - Density: 15.3/sq mi (5.89/km^{2})
- Time zone: UTC-6 (Central (CST))
  - Summer (DST): UTC-5 (CDT)
- ZIP code: 56636
- Area code: 218
- FIPS code: 27-44332
- GNIS feature ID: 0665042

Morse Township is a township in Itasca County, Minnesota, United States. The population was 555 at the 2020 census.

The unincorporated community of Ball Club is located within Morse Township.

== Geography ==
According to the United States Census Bureau, the township has a total area of 37.3 square miles (96.5 km^{2}), of which 36.4 square miles (94.2 km^{2}) is land and 0.9 square miles (2.3 km^{2}), or 2.39%, is water.

== Demographics ==
As of the census of 2000, there were 605 people, 194 households, and 156 families living in the township. The population density was 16.6 people per square mile (6.4/km^{2}). There were 213 housing units at an average density of 5.9/sq mi (2.3/km^{2}). The racial makeup of the township was 89.92% White, 0.50% African American, 5.95% Native American, and 3.64% from two or more races. Hispanic or Latino of any race were 0.17% of the population.

There were 194 households, out of which 40.7% had children under the age of 18 living with them, 69.1% were married couples living together, 4.6% had a female householder with no husband present, and 19.1% were non-families. 16.5% of all households were made up of individuals, and 7.2% had someone living alone who was 65 years of age or older. The average household size was 3.12 and the average family size was 3.43.

In the township the population was spread out, with 32.6% under the age of 18, 9.3% from 18 to 24, 24.3% from 25 to 44, 24.8% from 45 to 64, and 9.1% who were 65 years of age or older. The median age was 34 years. For every 100 females, there were 97.1 males. For every 100 females age 18 and over, there were 107.1 males.

The median income for a household in the township was $39,821, and the median income for a family was $45,694. Males had a median income of $44,375 versus $18,125 for females. The per capita income for the township was $14,499. About 7.9% of families and 12.4% of the population were below the poverty line, including 15.1% of those under age 18 and 11.5% of those age 65 or over.
