= Granite City Crossing =

Bridge in United States of America

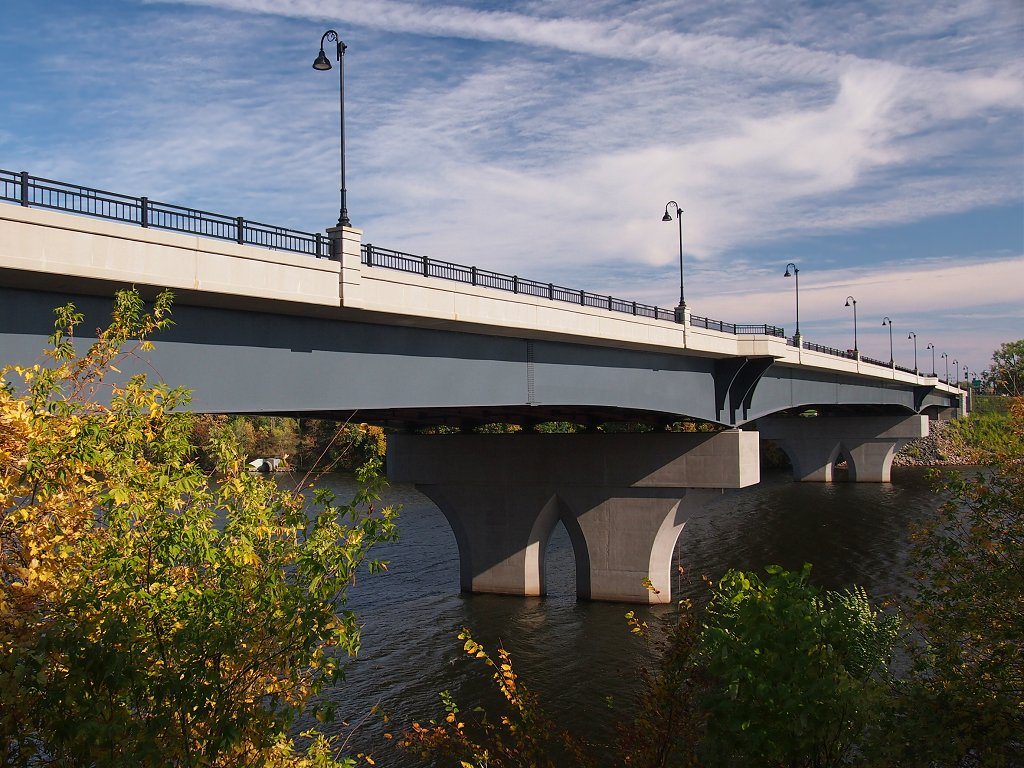
- Granite City Crossing from the southwest
- Coordinates: 45°33′40″N 94°09′07″W
- Carries: Four lanes of MN 23
- Crosses: Mississippi River
- Locale: St. Cloud Minnesota
- Maintained by: Minnesota Department of Transportation
- ID number: 73014

History
- Opened: 2009

The Granite City Crossing is a bridge that carries Minnesota State Highway 23 across the Mississippi River in the city of St. Cloud, Minnesota, United States. It was built to replace the DeSoto Bridge in the same location. Construction began in the fall of 2008, after the demolition of the DeSoto Bridge was completed. The bridge opened to traffic on October 29, 2009.

== See also ==
- DeSoto Bridge
- St. Cloud
- List of crossings of the Upper Mississippi River
