= Red Wing Bridge =

Eisenhower Bridge
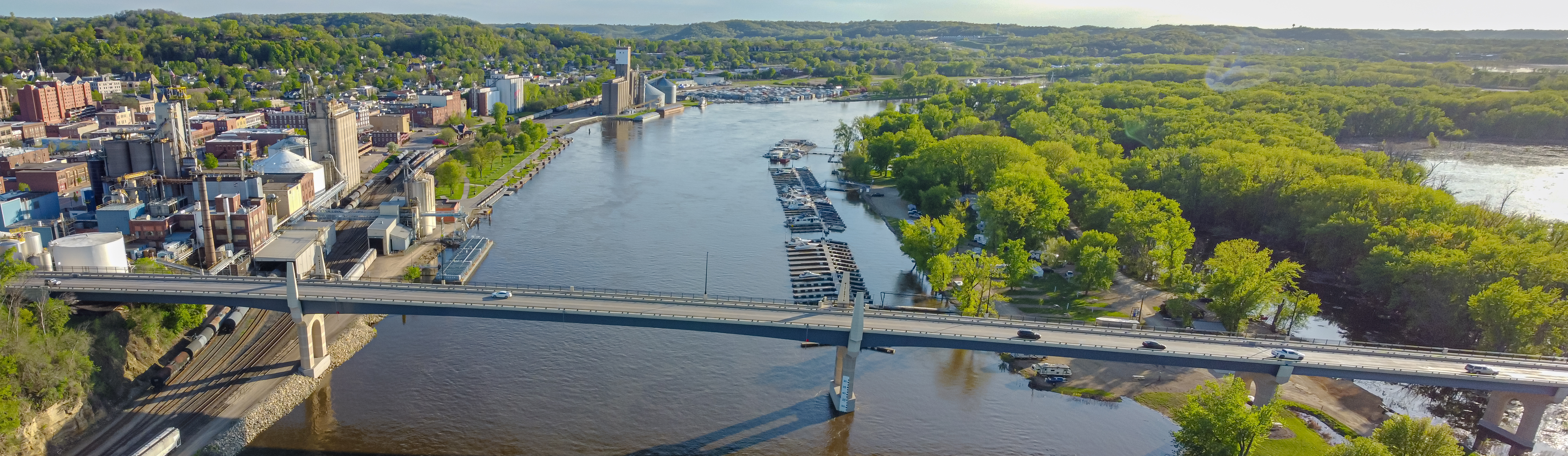
- The bridge in 2024
- Coordinates: 44°34′12″N 92°32′02″W
- Carries: US 63
- Crosses: Mississippi River
- Locale: Red Wing, Minnesota
- Official name: Eisenhower Bridge
- Maintained by: Minnesota Department of Transportation and Wisconsin Department of Transportation
- ID number: 9040 (Minnesota), B-47-0027 (Wisconsin)

Characteristics
- Design: Cantilever bridge
- Total length: 1631 feet
- Width: 35 feet
- Longest span: 432 feet
- Clearance below: 64 feet

History
- Opened: November 1960

Location
- Interactive map of Eisenhower Bridge

The Red Wing Bridge is a bridge that carries U.S. Route 63 across the Mississippi River from Wisconsin to Red Wing, Minnesota.

The previous bridge at the site was a cantilever bridge. It was officially named the Eisenhower Bridge for Dwight D. Eisenhower, the 34th President of the United States, who opened the bridge in November 1960.

After the collapse of the I-35W bridge in Minneapolis, the State of Minnesota conducted a thorough investigation of the state's road infrastructure, and the Red Wing Bridge was identified as in need of replacement. Construction on the replacement span began in 2017 and the original bridge was demolished in February 2020.

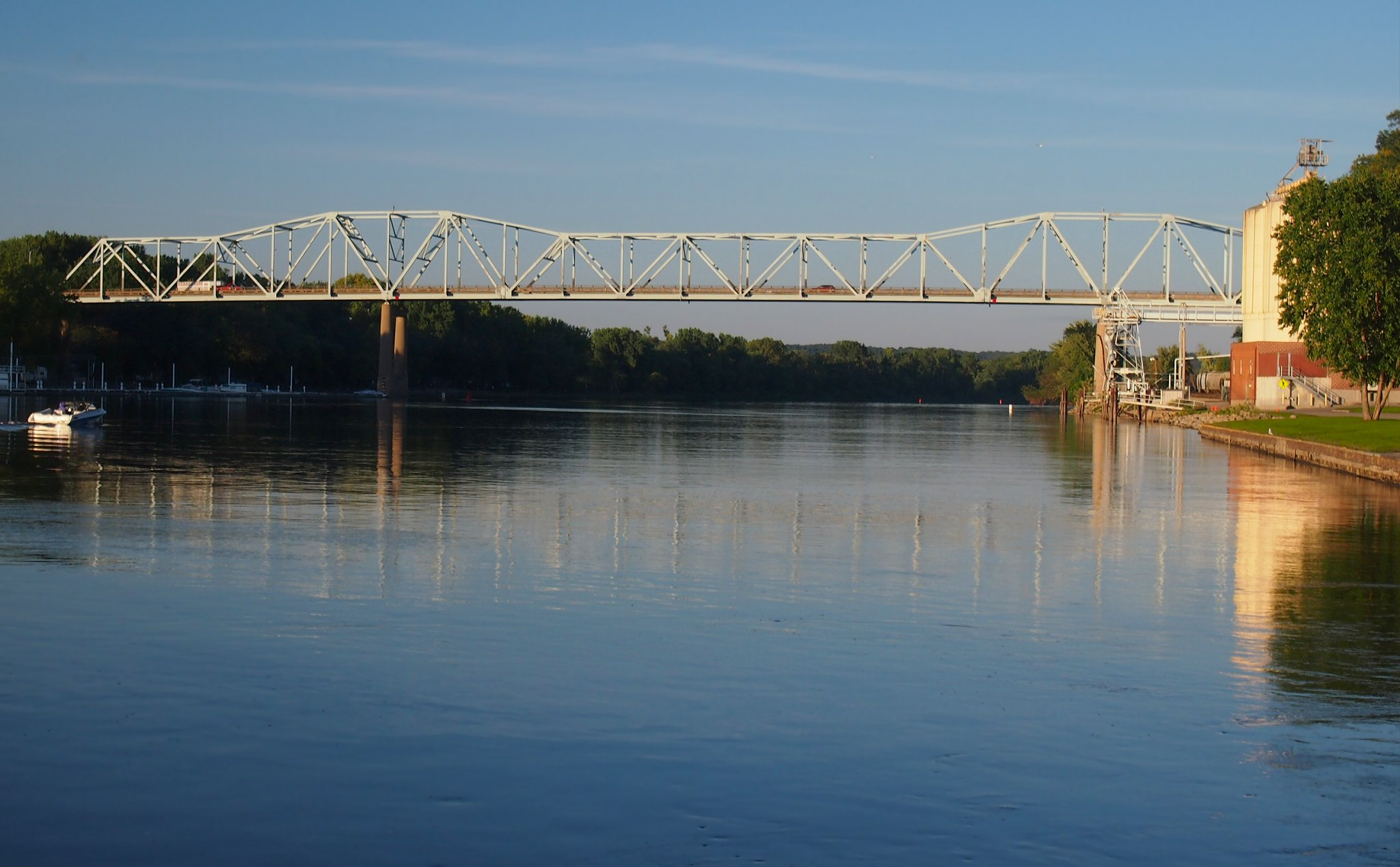
The previous cantilever bridge, demolished 2020.

== See also ==
- List of crossings of the Upper Mississippi River
