= Veterans Bridge (St. Cloud, Minnesota) =

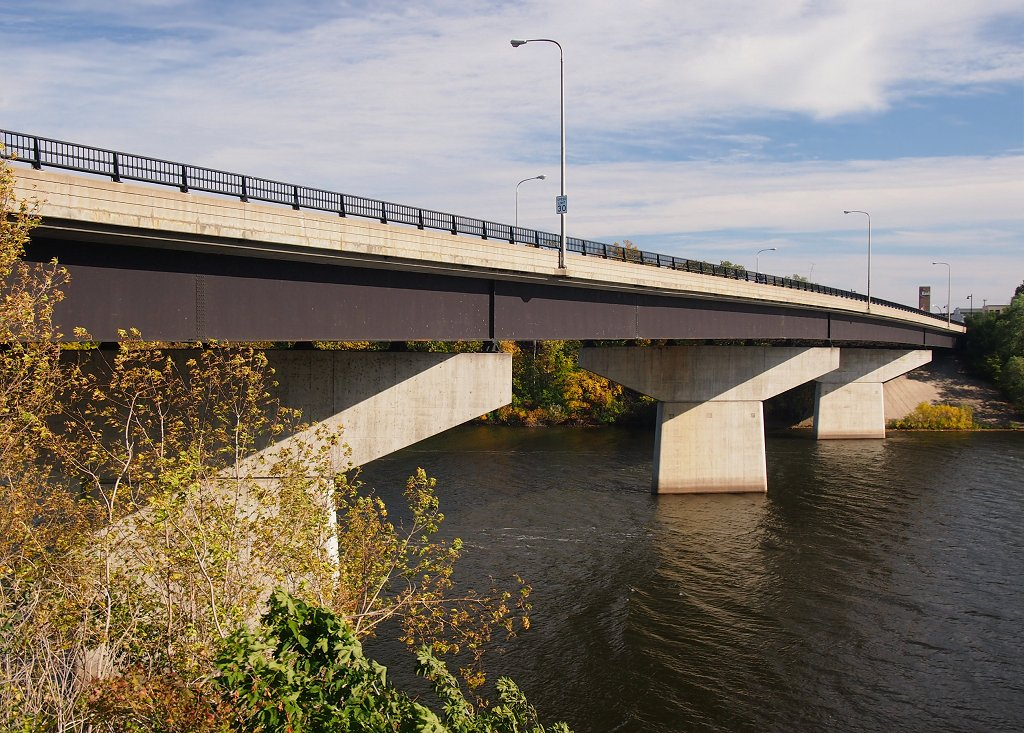
- The Veterans Bridge from the southwest
- Coordinates: 45°33′47″N 94°09′22″W
- Carries: Four lanes of First Street North / East St. Germain Street
- Crosses: Mississippi River
- Locale: St. Cloud, Minnesota
- Maintained by: City of St. Cloud
- ID number: 73514

Characteristics
- Design: Girder bridge
- Total length: 767 feet
- Width: 70 feet
- Longest span: 215 feet
- Clearance below: 42 feet

History
- Opened: 1971

Veterans Bridge is a steel girder bridge that spans the Mississippi River in St. Cloud, Minnesota, United States. It was built in 1971 and was designed by Howard, Needles, Tammen & Bergendoff.

There have been three previous bridges at this location. The first was built in 1867 by the St. Cloud Bridge Company and was a wooden toll bridge. The city bought the bridge in 1887 and rebuilt it with iron and wood. In 1894, the wooden bridge was replaced with a deck truss bridge, which survived until the new bridge was built in 1971.

== See also ==
- List of crossings of the Upper Mississippi River
