= Tywappity Township, Mississippi County, Missouri =

Township in Mississippi County, Missouri, U.S.

Coordinates: 36.9361°N 89.3206°W

Tywappity Township is an inactive township in Mississippi County, in the U.S. state of Missouri.

Tywappity is a name possibly derived from the Shawnee language.
