= U.S. Route 36 in Illinois =

Segment of American highway

U.S. Route 36
- US 36 highlighted in red

Route information
- Maintained by IDOT
- Length: 216.47 mi (348.37 km)

Major junctions
- West end: I-72 / US 36 / Route 110 (CKC) in Hull
- I-172 / IL 110 (CKC) in Hull; US 54 / IL 107 in Pittsfield; US 67 in Jacksonville; I-55 in Springfield; I-72 / US 51 in Decatur; US 45 in Tuscola; I-57 in Tuscola; US 150 / IL 1 in Chrisman
- East end: US 36 in Chrisman

Location
- Country: United States
- State: Illinois
- Counties: Pike, Scott, Morgan, Sangamon, Macon, Piatt, Moultrie, Douglas, Edgar

Highway system
- United States Numbered Highway System; List; Special; Divided; Illinois State Highway System; Interstate; US; State; Tollways; Scenic
← IL 35	→ IL 37

In the U.S. state of Illinois, U.S. Route 36 (US 36) is an east–west highway that runs across the central portion of the state. It runs east from Missouri over the Mark Twain Memorial Bridge over the Mississippi River with Interstate 72. The eastern terminus of U.S. 36 in Illinois is located near the unincorporated area of Raven near the Illinois-Indiana state line. This is a distance of 216.47 miles (348.37 km).

== Route description ==
U.S. 36 parallels the old Wabash Railroad from the Mississippi River at Hannibal, MO east to Decatur, IL. Norfolk Southern Railway operates on this route today.

U.S. 36 is overlapped with Interstate 72 for more than half its routing in Illinois, 133 miles (214 km). At Decatur, I-72 separates from it and travels around the city to the north, while US 36 enters the city and passes through downtown on the four-lane Eldorado Street. Just beyond 19th Street, US 36 turns to the southeast on a four-lane divided alignment paralleling a railroad, exiting Decatur on the southeast side. The road crosses Lake Decatur and narrows to two lanes before turning due east. After turning east, U.S. 36 runs largely in a straight line, mostly through open country, until it exits the state.

== History ==
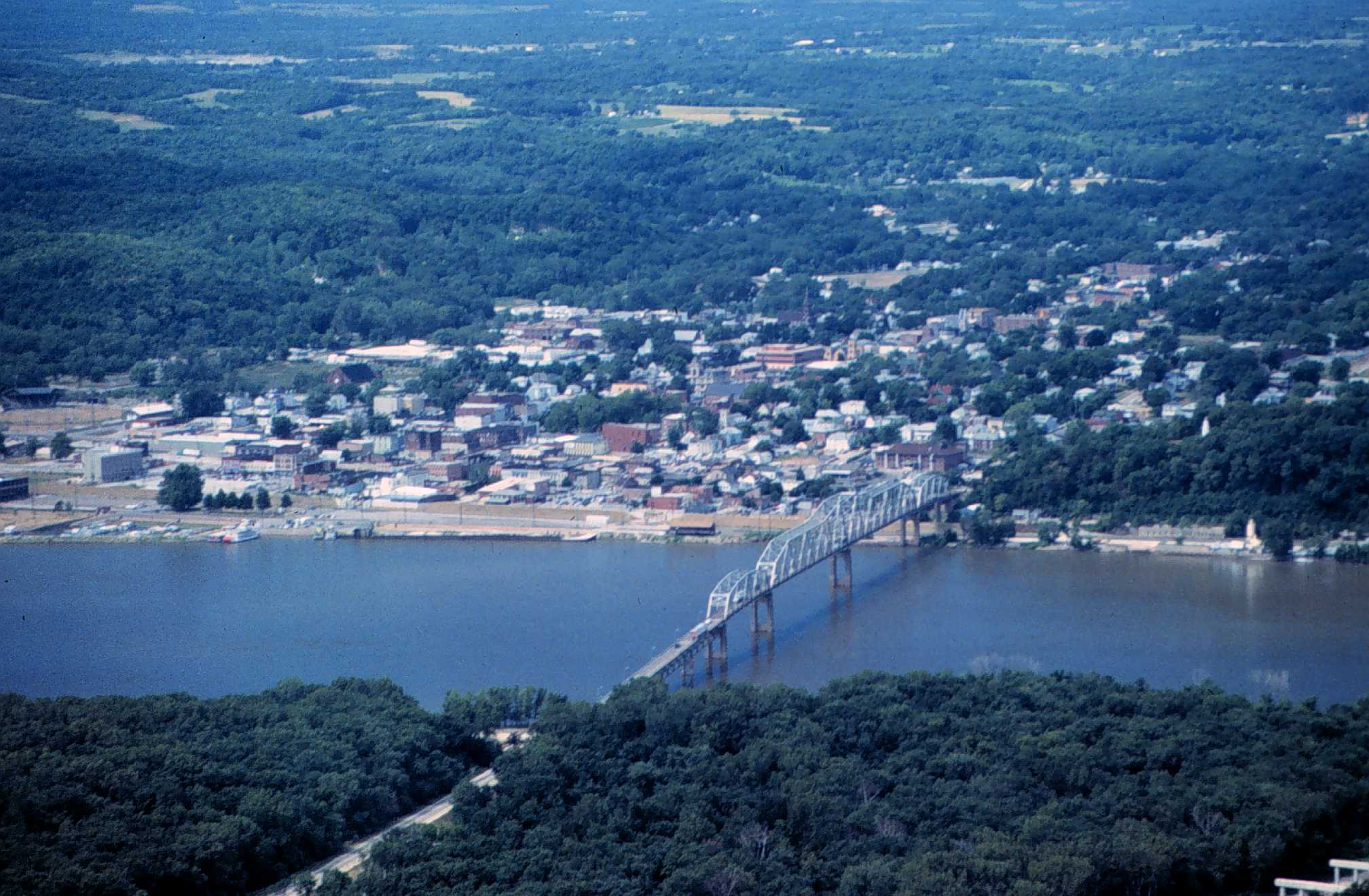
1997 picture of the old Mark Twain Memorial Bridge; three years before its closure

Initially, US 36 followed part of IL 106, IL 36, IL 3, IL 10, and IL 121 (which is newly built back then). A couple of portions were under construction. In 1935, these state routes were either truncated or removed due to confusion (like IL 36) and redundancy. In 1936, US 36 moved from the Wabash Bridge (now used by railroad) to the old Mark Twain Memorial Bridge.

From 1942 to 1971, US 54 ran concurrently with US 36 from New Hartford to the east side of Springfield, where US 54 diverged for Chicago.

Until around 1977, no significant changes to US 36 were made. Then, Interstate 72 (and another part of the freeway that would later become I-72) extended from Monticello to Jacksonville. As a result, US 36 moved to a part of I-72 from Decatur to Jacksonville. By 1979, the freeway then extended west near Riggston. By 1988, it extended west to IL 100. At this point, the Valley City Eagle Bridges were completed. However, by 1992, the twin spans, as well as the freeway west to IL 336, opened. By 1996, the Interstate 72 designation extends west using the new US 36 freeway and ends abruptly as soon as US 36 leaves the freeway. Also, Interstate 172 acquired the whole of the IL 336 freeway portion. In 2000, I-72 extended west to connect to Hannibal, Missouri, after a new Mark Twain Memorial Bridge opened. As a result, US 36 moved northward to get onto the new bridge. After that, the old bridge was demolished.

== Major intersections ==
County	Location	mi	km	Exit	Destinations	Notes
Mississippi River		0.0	0.0		I-72 west / US 36 west / Route 110 (CKC) west – Hannibal	Continuation into Missouri
Mississippi River		0.0	0.0	Mark Twain Memorial Bridge; Missouri–Illinois state line		
Pike	Levee Township	1.2	1.9	1	IL 106 – Hull	
Pike	Levee Township	4.2	6.8	4	I-172 north / IL 110 (CKC) east – Quincy	Left exit from both directions; I-172 exit 0.
Pike	Kinderhook Township	10.2	16.4	10	IL 96 to IL 106 – Payson, Hull	
Pike	Barry	20.1	32.3	20	To IL 106 – Barry	
Pike	New Salem Township	31.2	50.2	31	Pittsfield, New Salem	
Pike	Griggsville Township	35.0	56.3	35	US 54 west – Pittsfield IL 107 north – Griggsville	Eastern terminus of US 54; southern terminus of IL 107
Scott	Bloomfield Precinct	45.8	73.7	46	IL 100 – Bluffs, Detroit	Detroit signed westbound only
Scott	Winchester No. 2 Precinct	51.9	83.5	52	To IL 106 – Winchester	
Morgan	Lynnville Precinct	60.5	97.4	60	I-72 BL east / US 67 – Alton, Beardstown, Jacksonville	Signed as exits 60A (south) and 60B (north)
Morgan	South Jacksonville	64.1	103.2	64	IL 267 – Alton, Jacksonville	
Morgan	Pisgah Precinct	68.5	110.2	68	I-72 BL west to IL 104 – Jacksonville	
Morgan	Alexander Precinct	75.6	121.7	76	Ashland, Alexander	
Sangamon	Island Grove–New Berlin township line	81.9	131.8	82	New Berlin	
Sangamon	Springfield	91.2	146.8	91	Wabash Avenue	
Sangamon	Springfield	93.8	151.0	93	IL 4 (Veterans Parkway) – Chatham	
Sangamon	Springfield	95.6	153.9	96	MacArthur Blvd	
Sangamon	Springfield	97.0	156.1	92; 97	I-55 south / I-55 BL north (6th Street) – Springfield, St. Louis	West end of I-55 overlap; signed as exit 97 (south). Signed as exit 92A (north) westbound. I-72 westbound exits I-55 via exit 92B.
Sangamon	Springfield	99.5	160.1	94	Stevenson Drive, East Lake Drive	
Sangamon	Springfield	101.5	163.3	96	IL 29 (South Grand Avenue) – Taylorville	Signed as exits 96A (south) and 96B (north)
Sangamon	Springfield	102.6	165.1	98; 103	I-55 north – Chicago IL 97 west (Clear Lake Avenue)	East end of I-55 overlap; I-72 eastbound exits I-55 via exit 98A, I-72 westbound exits itself via exit 103A. IL 97 signed as exit 98B eastbound. Northbound I-55 signed as exit 103B westbound.
Sangamon	Clear Lake Township	103.4	166.4	104	Camp Butler	
Sangamon	Clear Lake Township	107.6	173.2	108	Riverton, Dawson	Dawson signed eastbound only
Sangamon	Mechanicsburg Township	113.7	183.0	114	Buffalo, Mechanicsburg, Dawson	Dawson signed westbound only
Sangamon	Illiopolis Township	121.8	196.0	122	Mt. Auburn, Illiopolis	
Macon	Niantic Township	127.0	204.4	128	Niantic	
Macon	Decatur	132.9	213.9	133	I-72 east / US 51 – Champaign, Urbana, Vandalia, Bloomington	Eastern end of I-72 concurrency
Macon	Decatur	136.8	220.2		IL 48 (Fairview Ave)	
Macon	Decatur	138.4	222.7		US 51 Bus. (Main St, Franklin St)	One-way pair
Macon	Decatur	139.6	224.7		IL 105 north / IL 121 (22nd St)	Western end of IL 121 concurrency
Macon	Decatur	142.7	229.7		IL 121 south (Mount Zion Rd)	Eastern end of IL 121 concurrency
Moultrie–Piatt county line	La Place	151.6	244.0		IL 32 – La Place, Lovington	
Douglas	Tuscola	174.3	280.5		US 45 – Champaign, Mattoon	
Douglas	Tuscola	175.8	282.9		I-57 – Effingham, Champaign	I-57 exit 212
Douglas	Camargo	180.5	290.5		IL 130 south – Charleston	Western end of IL 130 concurrency
Douglas	Camargo	181.3	291.8		IL 130 north – Urbana	Eastern end of IL 130
Edgar	Newman	193.0	310.6		IL 49 – Kankakee, Casey	
Edgar	Chrisman	207.0	333.1		US 150 / IL 1 – Chrisman, Paris	
Edgar	Chrisman	216.47	348.37		US 36 east – Rockville	Indiana state line
1.000 mi = 1.609 km; 1.000 km = 0.621 mi: Concurrency terminus

U.S. Route 36
Previous state: Missouri	Illinois	Next state: Indiana
