= Interstate 72 =

Interstate Highway in Illinois and Missouri

Interstate 72
- I-72 highlighted in red

Route information
- Maintained by MoDOT and IDOT
- Length: 179.29 mi (288.54 km)
- Existed: 1971–present
- NHS: Entire route

Major junctions
- West end: US 36 / US 36 Bus. / US 61 (Avenue of the Saints) / Route 110 (CKC) in Hannibal, MO
- I-172 / IL 110 (CKC) in Fall Creek, IL; US 54 / IL 107 in Griggsville, IL; I-72 BL / US 67 in Jacksonville, IL; I-55 in Springfield, IL; US 36 / US 51 in Decatur, IL; I-57 in Champaign, IL
- East end: University Avenue & Church Street in Champaign, IL

Location
- Country: United States
- States: Missouri, Illinois
- Counties: MO: Marion; IL: Pike, Scott, Morgan, Sangamon, Macon, Piatt, Champaign

Highway system
- Interstate Highway System; Main; Auxiliary; Suffixed; Business; Future
- Missouri State Highway System; Interstate; US; State; Supplemental
- Illinois State Highway System; Interstate; US; State; Tollways; Scenic
← US 71	MO	→ Route 72
← IL 71	IL	→ IL 72

Interstate 72 (I-72) is an Interstate Highway in the Midwestern United States. Its western terminus is in Hannibal, Missouri, at an interchange with U.S. Route 61 (US 61); its eastern terminus is at University Avenue and Church Street in Champaign, Illinois. The route runs through the major cities of Decatur, Illinois, and Springfield, Illinois. In 2006, the Illinois General Assembly dedicated all of I-72 as Purple Heart Memorial Highway. The stretch between Springfield and Decatur is also called Penny Severns Memorial Expressway, and the section between mile 35 and the Mississippi River is known as the Free Frank McWorter Historic Highway.

== Route description ==
Lengths
	mi	km
MO	2.04	3.28
IL	177.25	285.26
Total	179.29	288.54

=== Missouri ===
I-72 runs for just over two miles (3.2 km) in the state of Missouri. Its western terminus is an interchange with US 61 to the Mark Twain Memorial Bridge over the Mississippi River. This bridge connects the city of Hannibal with Illinois. Presently, there are only two exits for I-72 in Missouri, only one of which is numbered

=== Illinois ===
I-72 parallels the old Wabash Railroad from Hannibal, east through Illinois to Champaign, Illinois. The Norfolk Southern Railway operates this railroad route today.

In Illinois, I-72 runs for 182 miles (293 km). The portion of I-72 and I-172 from Springfield to Quincy is commonly referred to as the Central Illinois Expressway (CIE). As of 2007, I-72 has one business route; I-72 Business (I-72 Bus.) in Jacksonville.

Near Valley City at mile-marker 42 are the Valley City Eagle Bridges. These two individual two-lane spans bridge the Illinois River in rural west-central Illinois. Near milemarker 78, a sign marks 90 degrees longitude.

At its eastern terminus in Champaign, I-72 continues as Church Street (westbound) and University Avenue (eastbound), which stay as one-way streets for an additional three miles (4.8 km) into downtown Champaign.

== History ==
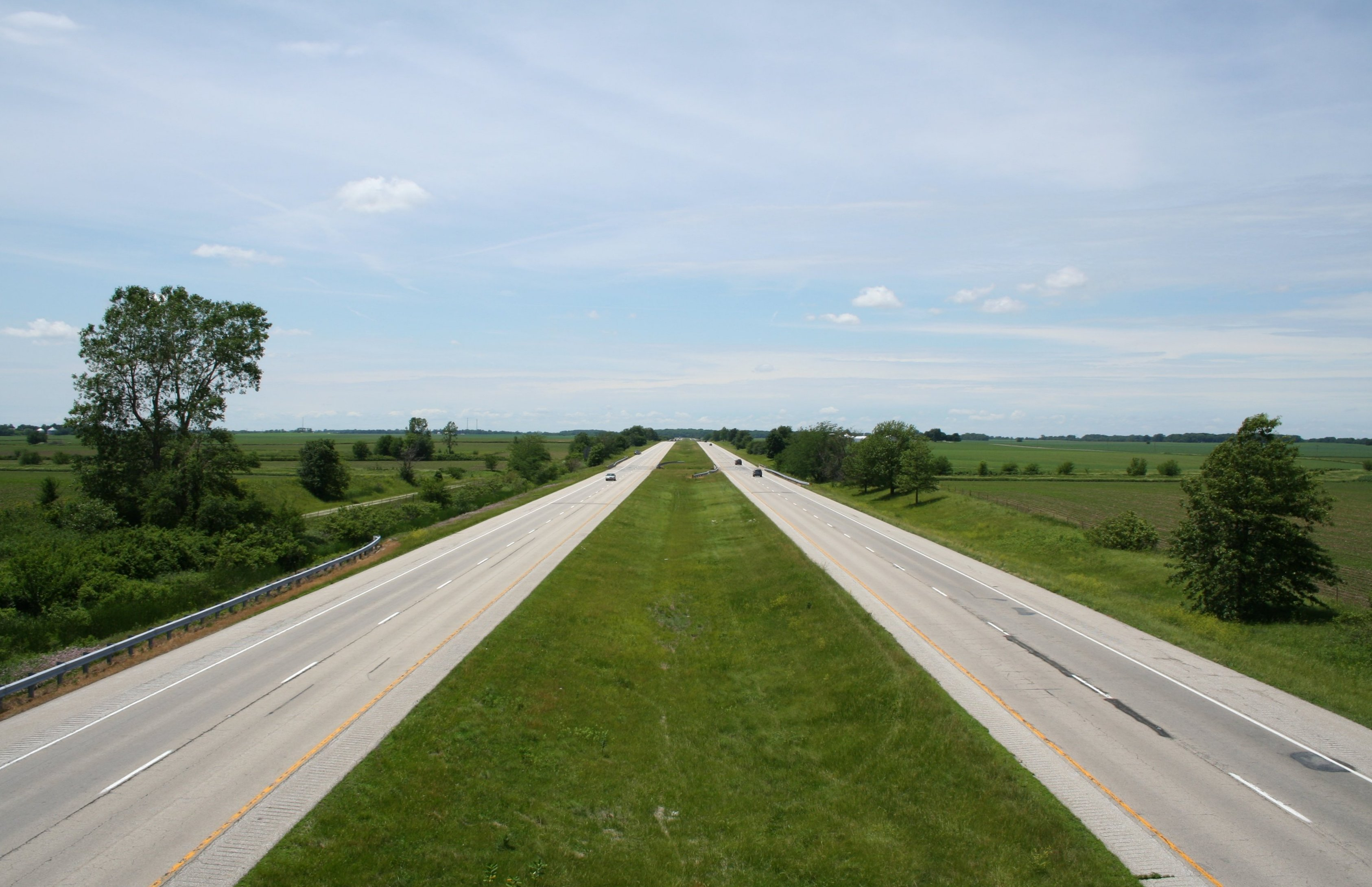
A section of I-72, north of Seymour, Illinois, looking west

First constructed in 1971, I-72 ran from Springfield at I-55 to Champaign at I-57 until the 1990s. On June 9, 1991, the American Association of State Highway and Transportation Officials (AASHTO) approved the establishment of I-172 from the western terminus of I-72 at Springfield to Fall Creek, four miles (6.4 km) east of Hannibal, Missouri, though it was contingent on Federal Highway Administration (FHWA) approval. The FHWA preferred to designate the route I-72.

After discussions regarding extending an Interstate Highway through the state of Missouri, on April 22, 1995, AASHTO approved another renumbering. I-172 was renumbered in its entirety as I-72. The US 36 extension west of Fall Creek was also given the I-72 designation. The Illinois Route 336 (IL 336) expressway was renumbered to I-172 from Fall Creek to Fowler.

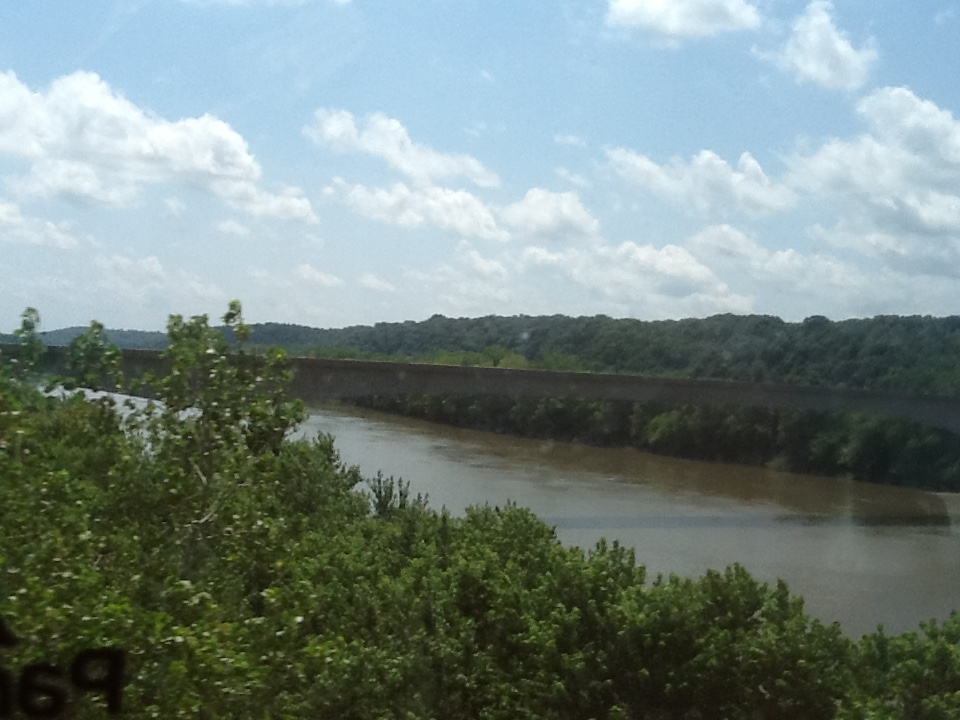
The bridge of Interstate 72 and U.S. Route 36 over the Illinois River, near Valley City, Illinois.

Prior to September 2000, Mark Twain Avenue (old US 36) was composed of the current Mark Twain Avenue (now Route 79) and the portion of I-72 and US 36 west of exit 157 to the Hannibal city limits. Route 79 terminated at the foot of the old Mark Twain Memorial Bridge at the corner of Third Street and Mark Twain Avenue. Signs along the four-lane expressway portion of Mark Twain Avenue marked the route as "Future I-72", while signs along what is now Route 79 had I-72 trailblazers to direct drivers to the temporary terminus at Fall Creek, Illinois. When the new Mark Twain Memorial Bridge was completed in September 2000, I-72 was routed over the new bridge, along with US 36. Route 79 was extended along Mark Twain Avenue to terminate at exit 157.

=== Chicago–Kansas City Expressway ===
The concept of I-72 across Missouri was to create the Chicago–Kansas City Expressway, a rural four-lane highway across northern Missouri and west central Illinois from Cameron, Missouri, at I-35 to Springfield, Illinois, at I-55. This would provide a series of rural four-lane highways (I-35, US 36, I-72, and I-55) connecting Chicago to the North American Free Trade Agreement (NAFTA) Corridor (High Priority Corridor 23). This would reduce the amount of through traffic, primarily truck traffic, in the St. Louis, Des Moines, and Quad Cities metropolitan areas by serving as an alternate route for I-70 and I-80. The Missouri portion of this route is designated as part of High Priority Corridor 61.

Based on the 157-mile (253 km) marker at Route 79, if/when US 36 is upgraded to Interstate standards across Missouri, the future western terminus of I-72 would be at Cameron at the intersection with I-35. Currently, the west end of I-72 route is west of US 61 and flows concurrent with US 36 into Illinois. In 2004, US 36 was upgraded to a four-lane expressway between US 61 and US 24 at the Rocket Junction (seven miles (11 km)). There are three exits along this expressway: Veterans Road, Shinn Lane (Hannibal Regional Hospital), and US 24 east at the Rocket Junction. Also, an interchange with Route 15 was installed in Shelbina.

Due to funding priorities, upgrading US 36 between Macon and Hannibal was a low-priority project and was shelved. The Missouri Department of Transportation (MoDOT) committed to constructing the four-lane highway as an at-grade expressway only if the five counties served by US 36 east of Macon would contribute half of the $100 million (equivalent to $140 million in 2024) cost. Road construction to complete the 52.4 miles (84.3 km) between Hannibal and Macon began in 2007. In August 2010, the four-lane expressway was completed from Macon to Hannibal, completing Missouri's portion of the Chicago–Kansas City Expressway.

== Future ==
Plans exist to extend I-72 westward from its current terminus in Hannibal to St. Joseph, Missouri along the existing US 36, but the proposal was shelved for years despite most of the route being a part of the Chicago–Kansas City Expressway. In May 2023, Missouri lawmakers approved a $2.5 million study on the conversion of US 36 into I-72. The extension of I-72 is seen as a way to relieve the pressure off of I-70 as well as reduce truck traffic in St. Louis. However, in July 2023, the bill was vetoed by Governor Mike Parson who said that it was not the right time to run the study. The extension to I-29 is listed under High Priority Corridor 61B, although part of it was for the CKC and not I-72.

== Exit list ==
State	County	Location	mi	km	Exit	Destinations	Notes
Missouri	Marion	Hannibal	0.000	0.000		US 36 / Route 110 (CKC) west – Monroe City, Kansas City	Continuation beyond US 36 Bus. / US 61
Missouri	Marion	Hannibal	0.184	0.296	–	US 36 Bus. east / US 61 (McMasters Avenue / Avenue of the Saints) / Great River Road – New London, Palmyra	Western end of US 61 Bus. concurrency
Missouri	Marion	Hannibal	1.226	1.973	157	US 36 Bus. west / US 61 Bus. south / Route 79 south / Route N north / Great River Road – Downtown Hannibal, Louisiana	Eastern end of US 61 Bus. concurrency; exit number based on possible future western terminus at I-35 in Cameron
Mississippi River			2.056 0.00	3.309 0.00	Mark Twain Memorial Bridge		
Illinois	Pike	Levee Township	1.20	1.93	1	IL 106 – Hull	
Illinois	Pike	Levee Township	4.25	6.84	4	I-172 north / IL 110 (CKC) east – Quincy, Chicago	Left exit from both directions; I-172 exit 0
Illinois	Pike	Kinderhook Township	10.31	16.59	10	IL 96 / IL 106 – Payson, Hull	
Illinois	Pike	Barry	20.23	32.56	20	To IL 106 – Barry	
Illinois	Pike	New Salem Township	31.35	50.45	31	Pittsfield, New Salem	
Illinois	Pike	Griggsville Township	35.07	56.44	35	US 54 west – Pittsfield IL 107 north – Griggsville	Eastern terminus of US 54
Illinois	Scott	Bloomfield Precinct	45.90	73.87	46	IL 100 – Bluffs, Detroit	Detroit signed westbound only
Illinois	Scott	Winchester No. 2 Precinct	51.97	83.64	52	To IL 106 – Winchester	
Illinois	Morgan	Lynnville Precinct	60.57	97.48	60	I-72 BL east / US 67 – Alton, Beardstown, Jacksonville	Signed as exits 60A (south) and 60B (north)
Illinois	Morgan	South Jacksonville	64.15	103.24	64	IL 267 (Main Street) – Alton, Jacksonville	
Illinois	Morgan	Pisgah Precinct	68.56	110.34	68	I-72 BL west to IL 104 (Morton Avenue) – Jacksonville	
Illinois	Morgan	Alexander Precinct	75.69	121.81	76	Ashland, Alexander	
Illinois	Sangamon	Island Grove–New Berlin township line	81.99	131.95	82	New Berlin	
Illinois	Sangamon	Springfield	91.35	147.01	91	Wabash Avenue	
Illinois	Sangamon	Springfield	93.86	151.05	93	IL 4 (Veterans Parkway) – Chatham	
Illinois	Sangamon	Springfield	95.67	153.97	96	MacArthur Boulevard	
Illinois	Sangamon	Springfield	97.16	156.36	92; 97	I-55 south / I-55 BL north (6th Street) – Springfield, St. Louis	Western end of I-55 concurrency; signed as exit 97A (south) and 97B (north) eastbound; signed as exit 92A (north) westbound; westbound I-72 exits southbound I-55 via exit 92B
Illinois	Sangamon	Springfield	99.61	160.31	94	Stevenson Drive, East Lake Drive	
Illinois	Sangamon	Springfield	101.56	163.44	96	IL 29 (South Grand Avenue) – Taylorville	Signed as exits 96A (south) and 96B (north); access to Illinois State Museum
Illinois	Sangamon	Springfield	102.66	165.22	98; 103	I-55 north – Chicago IL 97 west (Clear Lake Avenue)	Eastern end of I-55 concurrency; I-72 eastbound exits I-55 via exit 98A, I-72 westbound exits itself via exit 103A; IL 97 signed as exit 98B eastbound; northbound I-55 signed as exit 103B westbound
Illinois	Sangamon	Clear Lake Township	103.58	166.70	104	Camp Butler	Access to Camp Butler National Cemetery
Illinois	Sangamon	Clear Lake Township	107.75	173.41	108	Riverton, Dawson	Dawson signed eastbound only
Illinois	Sangamon	Mechanicsburg Township	113.82	183.18	114	Buffalo, Mechanicsburg, Dawson	Dawson signed westbound only
Illinois	Sangamon	Illiopolis Township	121.88	196.15	122	Mt. Auburn, Illiopolis	
Illinois	Macon	Niantic Township	127.11	204.56	128	Niantic	
Illinois	Macon	Harristown	132.77	213.67	133	US 36 east / US 51 south – Decatur, Pana	Eastern end of US 36 concurrency; western end of US 51 concurrency; signed as exits 133A (east) and 133B (south)
Illinois	Macon	Decatur	137.51	221.30	138	IL 121 – Decatur, Lincoln	
Illinois	Macon	Decatur	140.58	226.24	141	US 51 north – Bloomington, Decatur	Eastern end of US 51 concurrency, signed as exit 141A (south) and 141B (north)
Illinois	Macon	Whitmore Township	143.81	231.44	144	IL 48 – Oreana, Decatur	
Illinois	Macon	Whitmore Township	149.03	239.84	150	Argenta	
Illinois	Macon–Piatt county line	Friends Creek–Willow Branch township line	155.33	249.98	156	IL 48 – Cisco, Weldon	
Illinois	Piatt	Monticello Township	163.40	262.97	164	Monticello	
Illinois	Piatt	Monticello–Sangamon township line	165.38	266.15	166	IL 105 west – Monticello	
Illinois	Piatt	Sangamon Township	168.39	271.00	169	White Heath Road	
Illinois	Piatt	Sangamon Township	170.95	275.12	172	IL 10 – Clinton	
Illinois	Champaign	Scott Township	175.72	282.79	176	IL 47 – Mahomet	
Illinois	Champaign	Champaign	181.13	291.50	182	I-57 to I-74 – Memphis, Chicago; University Avenue, Church Street	Signed as exits 182A (south) and 182B (north); I-57 exit 235; roadway continues as University Avenue and Church Street
1.000 mi = 1.609 km; 1.000 km = 0.621 mi: Concurrency terminus

== Related routes ==
=== Interstate 172 ===
Interstate 172
- Location: Hull–Quincy, IL
- Length: 19.69 mi (31.69 km)
- Existed: 1995–present

Interstate 172 (I-172) is a spur route, the only auxiliary route of I-72. It is located entirely within the US state of Illinois and is completely concurrent with IL 110. The highway runs north from its start outside of Hannibal, Missouri, to about 2.5 miles (4.0 km) west of Fowler. At US 24, I-172 becomes Illinois Route 336 (IL 336), which runs north and east to Macomb via Carthage. The entire portion of I-172 and I-72 from I-172 east to Springfield is also known by its former name, the Central Illinois Expressway.

=== Jacksonville business route ===
Interstate 72 Business
- Location: Jacksonville, IL
- Length: 9.5 mi (15.3 km)

Interstate 72 Business (I-72) is a business loop of I-72 in Jacksonville. It runs from the I-72/US 36/US 67 interchange southwest of Jacksonville north along the US 67 bypass of Jacksonville to the former alignment of US 36 (Morton Avenue). On Morton Avenue, I-72 Bus. runs east through downtown Jacksonville until it reaches I-72 at exit 68. This is a distance of 9.5 miles (15.3 km).

Major intersections
The entire route is in Morgan County.

Location	mi	km	Destinations	Notes
Lynnville Precinct	0.0	0.0	I-72 west / US 36 west / US 67 south – Quincy, Jerseyville	Western end of US 67 concurrency; western terminus
Jacksonville	2.7	4.3	US 67 north – Beardstown, Rushville	Eastern end of US 67 concurrency
Jacksonville	3.8	6.1	US 67 Bus. north / IL 104 west	Western end of Bus. US 67/IL 104 concurrency
Jacksonville	5.1	8.2	Lincoln Avenue – Illinois College	
Jacksonville	6.1	9.8	US 67 Bus. south to IL 267	Eastern end of Bus. US 67 concurrency
Jacksonville	7.6	12.2	IL 104 east	Eastern end of IL 104 concurrency
Jacksonville	9.5	15.3	I-72 east / US 36 east – Springfield	Eastern terminus
1.000 mi = 1.609 km; 1.000 km = 0.621 mi: Concurrency terminus
