= U.S. Route 54 in Illinois =

U.S. Highway in Illinois

U.S. Route 54
- US 54 highlighted in red

Route information
- Maintained by IDOT
- Length: 23.9 mi (38.5 km)
- Existed: 1926–present

Major junctions
- West end: US 54 near Louisiana, MO
- IL 96 in Atlas; IL 106 between New Hartford and Pittsfield
- East end: I-72 / US 36 / IL 107 near Griggsville

Location
- Country: United States
- State: Illinois
- Counties: Pike

Highway system
- United States Numbered Highway System; List; Special; Divided; Illinois State Highway System; Interstate; US; State; Tollways; Scenic
← IL 53	→ IL 54

U.S. Route 54 (US 54) in Illinois is a 23.9-mile-long (38.5 km) east–west highway that travels from the Champ Clark Bridge on the Missouri state line to I-72/US 36/IL 107 south of Griggsville. At its greatest extent, US 54 used to continue east to Springfield, then northeast to Onarga, and then north all the way to Downtown Chicago.

== Route description ==
Beginning at the Champ Clark Bridge above the Mississippi River, US 54 travels in a northeastern direction. It then intersects IL 96 in Atlas and then travels in a northern direction. Along the way, US 54 comes across Lyman Scott House in Summer Hill. In New Hartford, the route then travels in a northeastern direction again. After that, it begins to run concurrently with IL 106 all the way toward Pittsfield. In Pittsfield, one block east of Pike County Courthouse, US 54 splits northward. After leaving Pittsfield, the route comes across I-72/US 36/IL 107. At this point, US 54 terminates at this diamond interchange.

== History ==
Map of US 54 prior to its truncation

Initially, US 54 ended at the junction of present-day IL 106 (former portion of US 36). In 1935, it replaced a portion of IL 107 between Louisiana, Missouri and New Hartford, Illinois. From 1942 to 1971, US 54 traveled all the way to Downtown Chicago. Before it was truncated back to its previous eastern terminus, it followed portions of current-day US 36, IL 54, US 45, IL 50, Governors Highway, Wood Street, 127th Street, Halsted Street, Vincennes Avenue, State Street, and Michigan Avenue. The four-lane section of US 36 northeast of Pittsfield now also carries Interstate 72 east to Springfield. As of 1992, US 54 was extended northeast to US 36 and present-day I-72 (exit 35). That same year, the section of road that once carried Illinois Route 54 through Springfield is no longer designated as a numbered highway. Now Illinois Route 54 starts at the Interstate 55 exit and goes northeast to Onarga, where it ends at U.S. Route 45. US 54 once joined with US 45 to Kankakee, but that highway is now designated as US 45 alone to Gilman, then US 45 and US 24 through Gilman, then US 45 alone again until a four-way intersection with U.S. Route 52 and Illinois Route 49, and US 45 and US 52 through Kankakee. Between Kankakee and Monee, the section that once carried US 54 is now marked as Illinois Route 50.

== Major intersections ==
The entire route is in Pike County.

Location	mi	km	Destinations	Notes
Atlas Township	0.0	0.0	US 54 west – Louisiana	Continuation into Missouri
Atlas Township	0.0– 0.3	0.0– 0.48	Champ Clark Bridge Great River Road Spur begins	
Atlas	5.9	9.5	IL 96 / Great River Road – Quincy, Pleasant Hill Great River Road Spur ends	Eastern terminus of Great River Road Spur
Pittsfield Township	14.9	24.0	IL 106 west – Hannibal, Missouri	West end of IL 106 concurrency
Pittsfield	18.7	30.1	IL 106 east – Detroit; Jackson Street south – Time, Nebo	East end of IL 106 concurrency
Griggsville Township	23.9	38.5	I-72 / US 36 – Quincy, Hannibal, Missouri, Springfield IL 107 north – Griggsville	Eastern terminus of US 54; southern terminus of IL 107
1.000 mi = 1.609 km; 1.000 km = 0.621 mi: Concurrency terminus
