= Illinois Route 107 =

State highway in Pike and Brown Counties, Illinois, US

Illinois Route 107
- IL 107 highlighted in red

Route information
- Maintained by IDOT
- Length: 23.14 mi (37.24 km)
- Existed: 1924–present

Major junctions
- South end: I-72 / US 36 / US 54 in Pittsfield
- North end: IL 99 in Mt. Sterling

Location
- Country: United States
- State: Illinois
- Counties: Pike, Brown

Highway system
- Illinois State Highway System; Interstate; US; State; Tollways; Scenic
← IL 106	→ IL 108

Illinois Route 107 is a north–south state highway in western Illinois. It runs from the northern terminus of U.S. Route 54 between Pittsfield and Griggsville north to Illinois Route 99 in Mt. Sterling. This is a distance of 23.14 miles (37.24 km).

== Route description ==
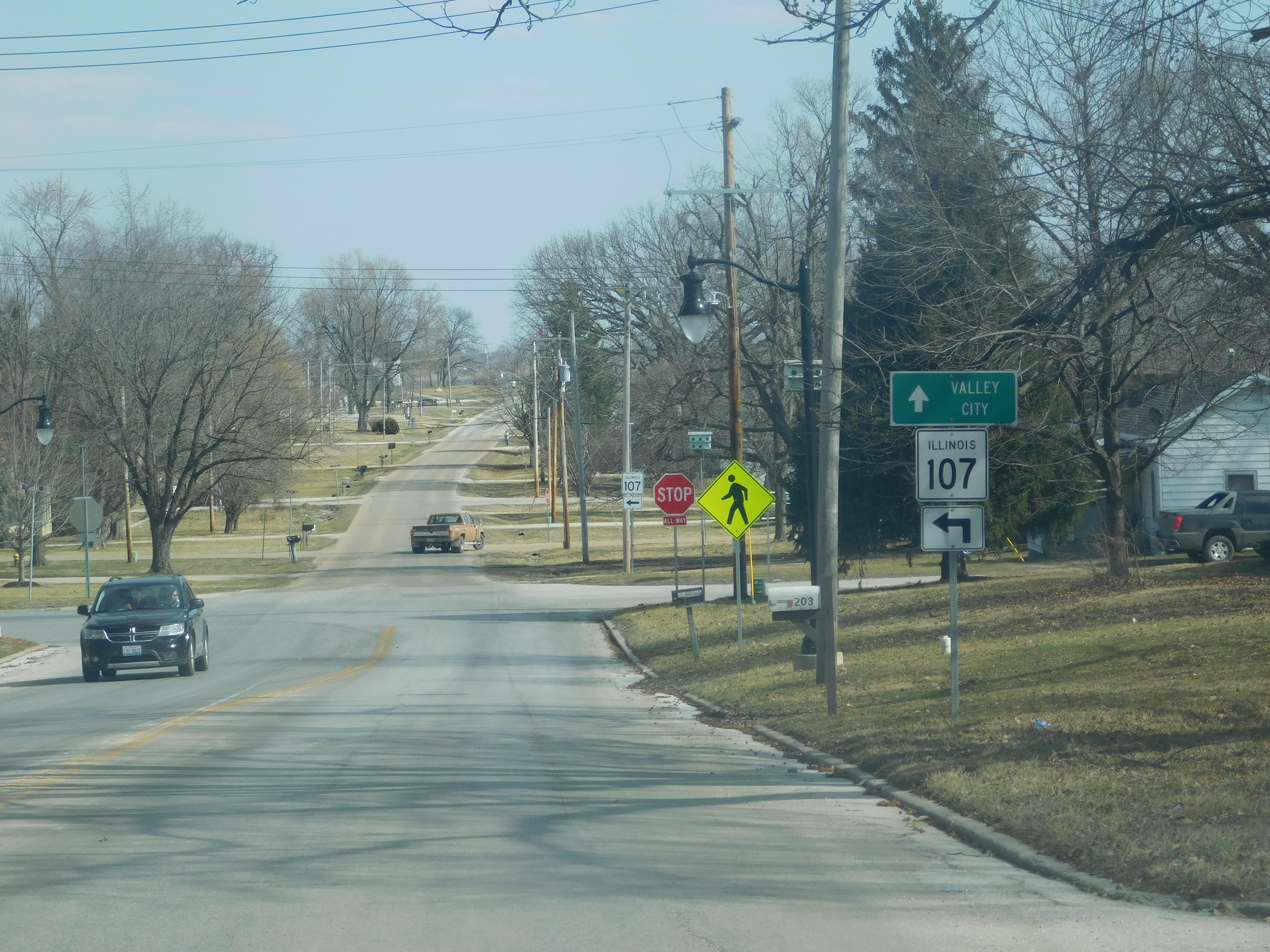
IL 107 in Griggsville

Illinois 107 begins at an interchange with Interstate 72, U.S. Route 36, and U.S. Route 54 in Pike County; this interchange also serves as US 54's northern terminus. Illinois 107 heads northeast from the interchange and passes through Griggsville. The route heads north from Griggsville before turning northwest and passing Perry. After a junction with Illinois Route 104 north of Perry, Illinois 107 enters Brown County and heads north toward Mt. Sterling. The road terminates at a junction with Illinois 99 in southern Mt. Sterling. Illinois 107 is a rural two-lane surface road for its entire length.

== History ==
SBI Route 107 originally ran from Pike Station (located at what is now U.S. Route 54 and the Mississippi River) to Griggsville. In 1935, all of the routes south of Pittsfield was changed to U.S. 54, leaving the portion between Pittsfield and Griggsville as Illinois 107. In 1964 the northern extension to Mount Sterling was added. In 1992, U.S. 54 replaced Illinois 107 north to the new U.S. Route 36 freeway, which then became Interstate 72. As a result, Illinois 107 and U.S. 54 now terminate at the same interchange.

== Major intersections ==
County	Location	mi	km	Destinations	Notes
Pike	Griggsville Township	0.00	0.00	US 54 west I-72 / US 36 – Springfield, Quincy, Hannibal	Southern terminus; I-72 exit 35; highway continues west as US 54
Pike	Perry Township	10.9	17.5	IL 104 – Quincy, Meredosia	
Brown	Mount Sterling Township	23.1	37.2	IL 99 – Mt. Sterling, Meredosia	Northern terminus
1.000 mi = 1.609 km; 1.000 km = 0.621 mi: Route transition
