= Illinois Route 96 =

State highway in western Illinois, US

Illinois Route 96
- Illinois Route 96 highlighted in red

Route information
- Maintained by IDOT
- Length: 141.16 mi (227.17 km)
- Existed: 1924–present

Major junctions
- South end: IL 100 in Kampsville
- US 54 in Rockport; I-72 / US 36 in Kinderhook I-172 / IL 110 (CKC) in Quincy; US 24 in Quincy; US 136 in Hamilton
- North end: IL 94 in Lomax

Location
- Country: United States
- State: Illinois
- Counties: Calhoun, Adams, Pike, Hancock, Henderson

Highway system
- Illinois State Highway System; Interstate; US; State; Tollways; Scenic
← IL 95	→ IL 97

Illinois Route 96 (IL 96) is a 141.16-mile-long (227.17 km) north–south state highway in far western Illinois, United States. It runs from IL 100 in Kampsville, not far from a ferry crossing across the Illinois River, to IL 94 north of Terre Haute.

== Route description ==
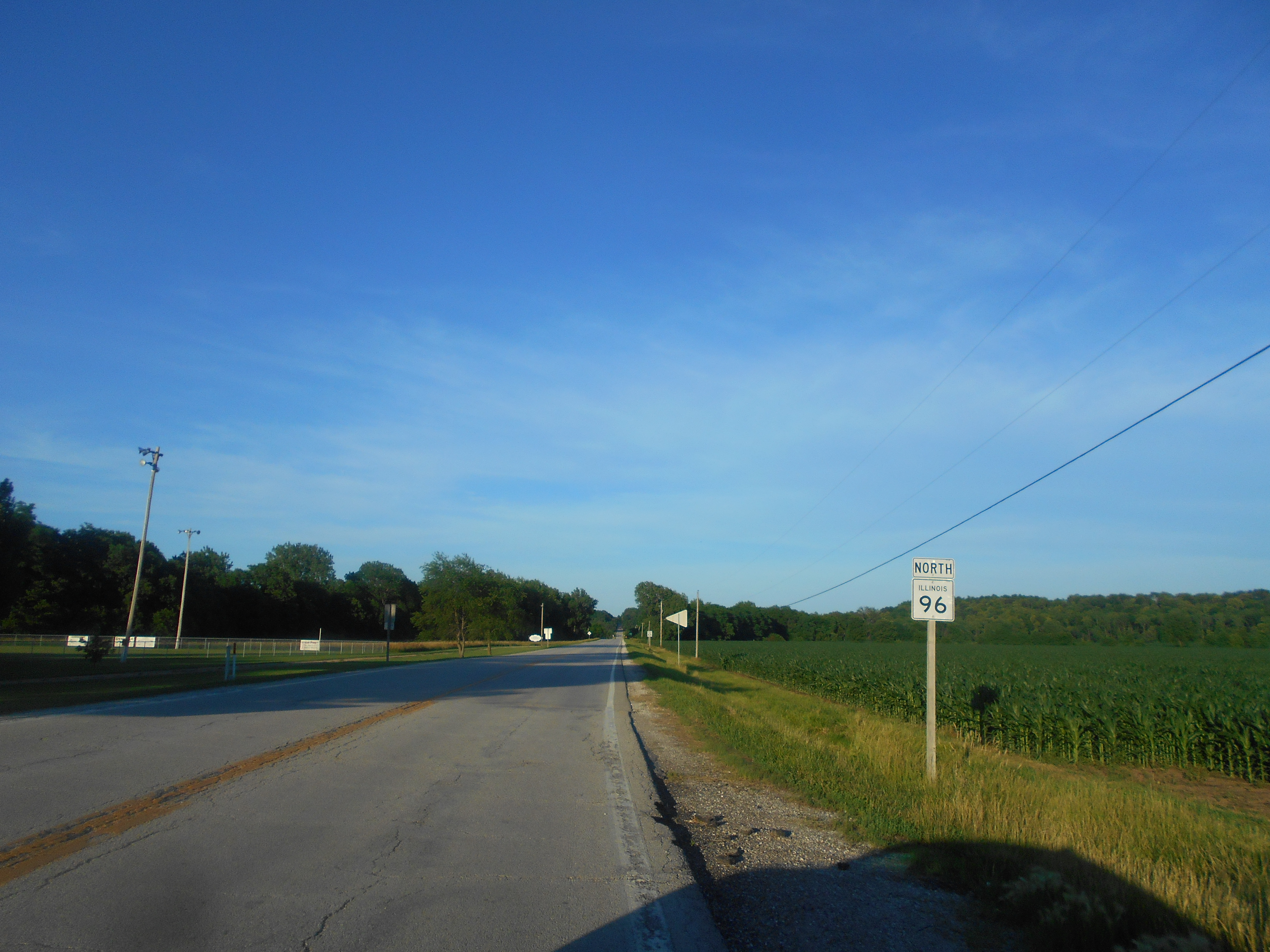
IL 96 in Lomax

Illinois 96 follows much of the Great River Road in Illinois north from Kampsville, where it runs west to the Mississippi River and then turns north, passing U.S. Route 54 at a rural intersection and Interstate 72 at an old terminus near Kinderhook. It overlaps Illinois Route 106 west of Kinderhook and then runs parallel to Illinois Route 57 into Quincy. Within Quincy it follows 36th Street, State Street and 24th Street before overlapping briefly with U.S. Route 24. It also overlaps U.S. Route 136 in Hamilton, Illinois, (across from Keokuk, Iowa) and Illinois Route 9 from Niota to Dallas City, Illinois. Between Hamilton and Dallas City, Illinois 96 also passes through historic Nauvoo along Durphy and Mulholland Streets, two major streets that intersect in the middle of the town.

== History ==
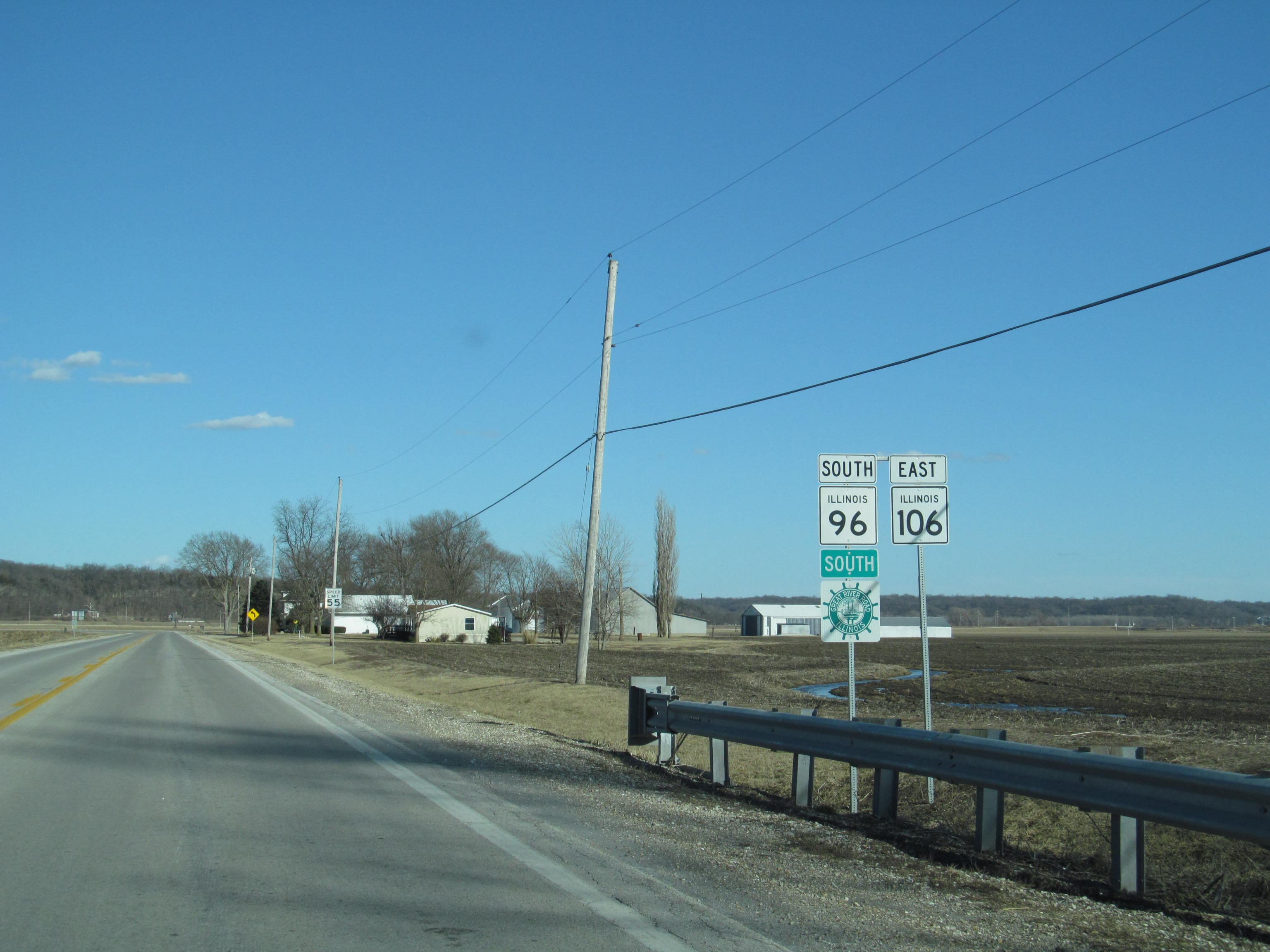
IL 96 concurrent with IL 106

SBI Route 96 originally followed the modern-day Illinois 96 from Niota south to Kinderhook. In 1941, the state announced that IL 96 was extended north through Dallas City and Lomax to Terre Haute. Various state route designations (IL 96A) were used for Carmen Road between Lomax and Gulfport until the 1965 Mississippi River floods. In March 1941, IL 96 was extended south to Hamburg to a historical ferry crossing. The Hamburg ferry stopped running in 1960. In 1950, Illinois 96 was rerouted into Kampsville, where another ferry crossing is located nearby on Illinois Route 108.

== Major intersections ==
County	Location	mi	km	Destinations	Notes
Calhoun	Kampsville	0.0	0.0	IL 100 / Great River Road south / Illinois River Road – Detroit, Alton, Archeological Museum	south end of Great River Road overlap
Calhoun	Mozier	7.3	11.7	Mississippi River Road - Hamburg	
Pike		19.7	31.7	County Highway 10 - Nebo	
Pike	Pleasant Hill	20.6	33.2	Main Street - Martinsburg	
Pike	Atlas	27.7	44.6	US 54 / Great River Road Spur – Louisiana, Pittsfield, Pike Station River Access	
Pike	New Canton	38.8	62.4	Mississippi Street - Barry, El Dara	
Pike	Kinderhook	44.4	71.5	IL 106 east (Quincy Street) – Barry	south end of IL 106 overlap
Pike	Hull	47.0	75.6	IL 106 west – Hull	north end of IL 106 overlap
Pike		47.4	76.3	I-72 / US 36 – Quincy, Hannibal, Springfield	I-72 exit 10
Pike		48.0	77.2	Great River Road north (County Highway 57) – Quincy	north end of Great River Road overlap; former IL 57
Adams		62.8	101.1	I-172 / IL 110 (CKC) to I-72 – Hannibal, Quincy, Macomb	I-172 exit 10
Adams	Quincy	68.6	110.4	IL 104 (Broadway Street)	
Adams		73.2	117.8	US 24 west / Great River Road (National Route) south / Lincoln Heritage Trail (Western Branch) spur – Quincy	south end of US 24 / Great River Road / Lincoln Heritage Trail spur overlap
Adams		73.8	118.8	US 24 east / Lincoln Heritage Trail (Western Branch) south – Quincy Airport, Mount Sterling	north end of US 24 / Lincoln Heritage Trail spur overlap; south end of Lincoln Heritage Trail overlap
Adams	Ursa	78.4	126.2	Maple Street - Meyer, Bear Creek Public Use Area, Canton Toll Ferry	
Adams	Ursa	78.5	126.3	IL 61 north	
Hancock		98.3	158.2	Great River Road (National Route) north – Warsaw, Warsaw Historical District	north end of Great River Road overlap
Hancock	Hamilton	102.2	164.5	US 136 east – Carthage	south end of US 136 overlap
Hancock	Hamilton	102.8	165.4	Great River Road Spur (7th Street) – Wildcat Springs Park	south end of Great River Road spur overlap
Hancock	Hamilton	102.9	165.6	US 136 west / Great River Road (National Route) south – Keokuk	north end of US 136 / Great River Road spur overlap; south end of Great River Road overlap
Hancock	Niota	123.7	199.1	IL 9 west / Great River Road (National Route) north – Fort Madison	south end of IL 9 overlap; north end of Great River Road (National Route) overlap (IL 96 north of here is an alternate route of the Great River Road)
Hancock	Dallas City	130.3	209.7	IL 9 east – La Harpe	north end of IL 9 overlap
Henderson	Lomax	136.3	219.4	Great River Road north / Lincoln Heritage Trail (Western Branch) north (Carman Road) to US 34	north end of Great River Road / Lincoln Heritage Trail overlap
Henderson	Lomax	141.16	227.17	IL 94 – Biggsville, La Harpe	
1.000 mi = 1.609 km; 1.000 km = 0.621 mi: Concurrency terminus; Tolled
