= Pittsfield High School (Illinois) =

Location
- 201 East Higbee Street; Pittsfield, Pike County, Illinois 62363; United States; 39.602°N 90.805°W

Information
- Other name: PHS
- Type: Comprehensive Public High School
- School district: Pikeland Community Unit School District 10
- Principal: Angie Greger
- Faculty: 29.00 (FTE)
- Grades: 9–12
- Enrollment: 323 (2018–19)
- Student to teacher ratio: 11.14
- Campus type: Small city
- Colors: Red, Black
- Athletics conference: Sangamo (Football), Pike County (Girls Basketball and Baseball)
- Mascot: Saukees
- Website: www.phs.net

Pittsfield High School, or PHS, is a public four-year high school located at 201 East Higbee Street in Pittsfield, Illinois, a small city in Pike County, Illinois, in the Midwestern United States. PHS serves the communities of Pittsfield, Baylis, Milton, Nebo, Pearl, and Rockport. The campus is located 35 miles west of Jacksonville, Illinois, and serves a mixed small city, village, and rural residential community.

== Academics ==
Potential reference:

== Athletics ==
Pittsfield High School competes in the Sangamo Conference in football and the Pike County Conference in Baseball and Girls Basketball. They are also a member school in the Illinois High School Association. The PHS mascot is the Saukees, with school colors of red and black. The school has 3 state championships on record in team athletics and activities: IDTA Pom A in 2009, IDTA Pom A in 2025, IDTA Hip-Hop A in 2025, Boys Basketball in 1990–1991 (A), and Boys Golf in 1982–1983 (A).

Pittsfield High School holds the IHSA state record for Most Consecutive football wins. Sixty four consecutive wins occurred from 6 September 1966 – 21 September 1973. http://www.ihsa.org/SportsActivities/BoysFootball/RecordsHistory.aspx?url=/data/fb/records/index.htm

== History ==
Former Milton, Nebo, and Pearl High Schools now attend Pittsfield. Baylis and Rockport may have also possessed high schools at some time which were consolidated into the current PHS. Potential citation:
