= Illinois Route 106 =

State highway in western Illinois, US

Illinois Route 106
- IL 106 highlighted in red

Route information
- Maintained by IDOT
- Length: 66.47 mi (106.97 km)
- Existed: 1938–present

Major junctions
- West end: I-72 / US 36 / IL 110 (CKC) in Hull
- US 54 in Pittsfield
- East end: US 67 in White Hall

Location
- Country: United States
- State: Illinois
- Counties: Pike, Scott, Greene

Highway system
- Illinois State Highway System; Interstate; US; State; Tollways; Scenic
← IL 105	→ IL 107

Illinois Route 106 (IL 106) is a 66.47-mile-long (106.97 km) east–west state highway in western Illinois. It runs from a new interchange with Interstate 72 (I-72) near East Hannibal (across from Hannibal, Missouri) to U.S. Route 67 (US 67) in White Hall.

== Route description ==
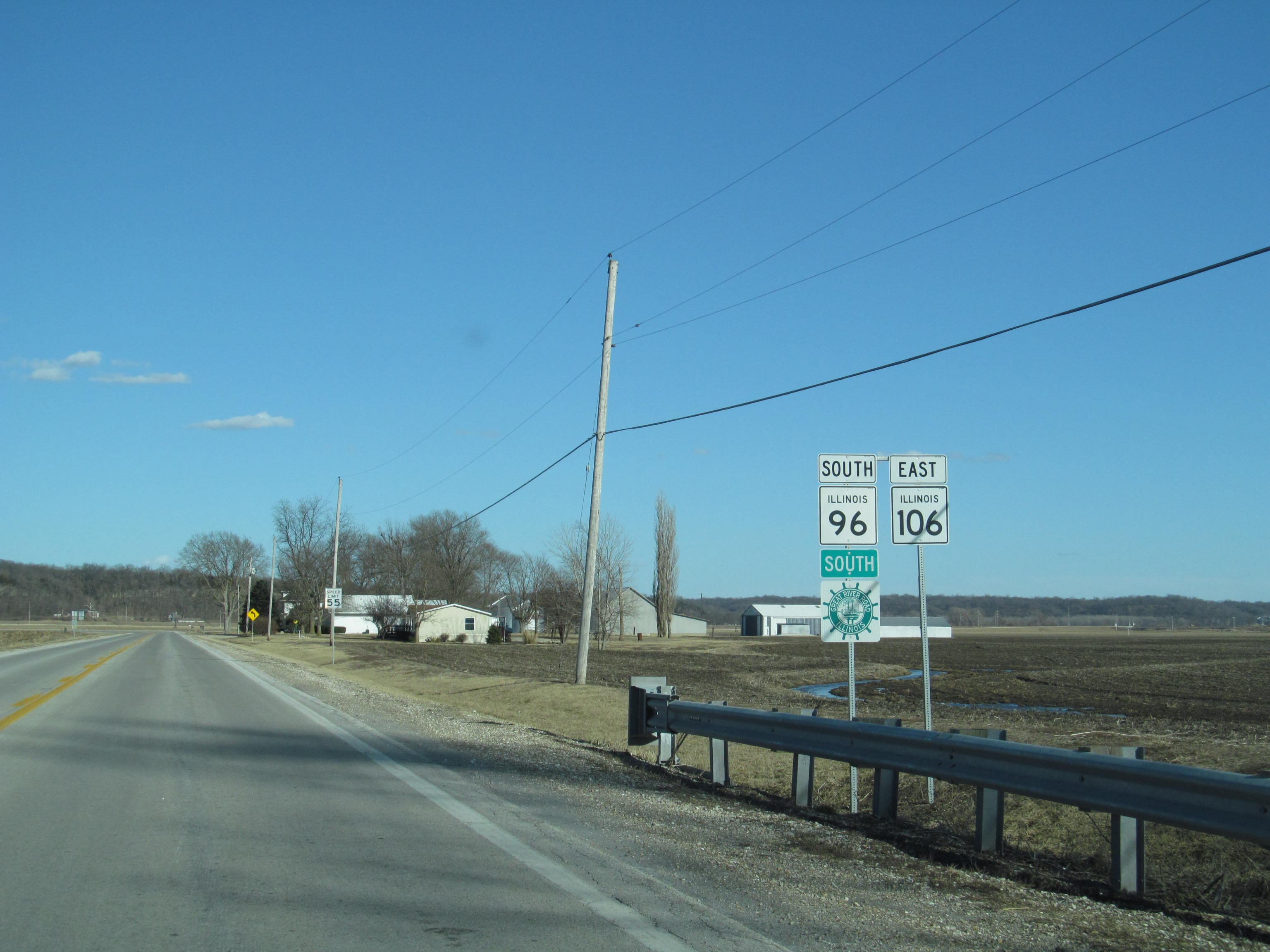
IL 106 concurrent with IL 96

IL 106 is an undivided, two-lane surface road for its entire length. A large portion west of Winchester largely parallels I-72/US 36.

Starting at I-72/US 36 interchange at East Hannibal, IL 106 travels southeastward before turning eastward near Aladdin. In Hull, it begins to overlaps IL 96. In Kinderhook, the concurrency ends as IL 96 branches south. Continuing east, IL 106 is briefly being sandwiched between I-72/US 36 and a railroad. Moving on, IL 106 passes through Barry. At this point, it turns southeast towards US 54. It then runs concurrently east with US 54 until reaching Pittsfield. At this point, US 54 turns north to I-72, US 54's eastern terminus. Further east, IL 106 starts to run concurrently east with IL 100 in Detroit. Near Florence, the concurrency then crosses the Illinois River via the Florence Bridge. After crossing the bridge, the concurrency continues until IL 100 branches north near Bloomfield. West of Winchester, IL 106 keeps continuing east towards downtown. On the other hand, the road that curves north was part of the former alignment of US 36. After leaving Winchester, IL 106 curves south. It passes Alsey and Barrow before terminating at US 67 near downtown White Hall.

== History ==
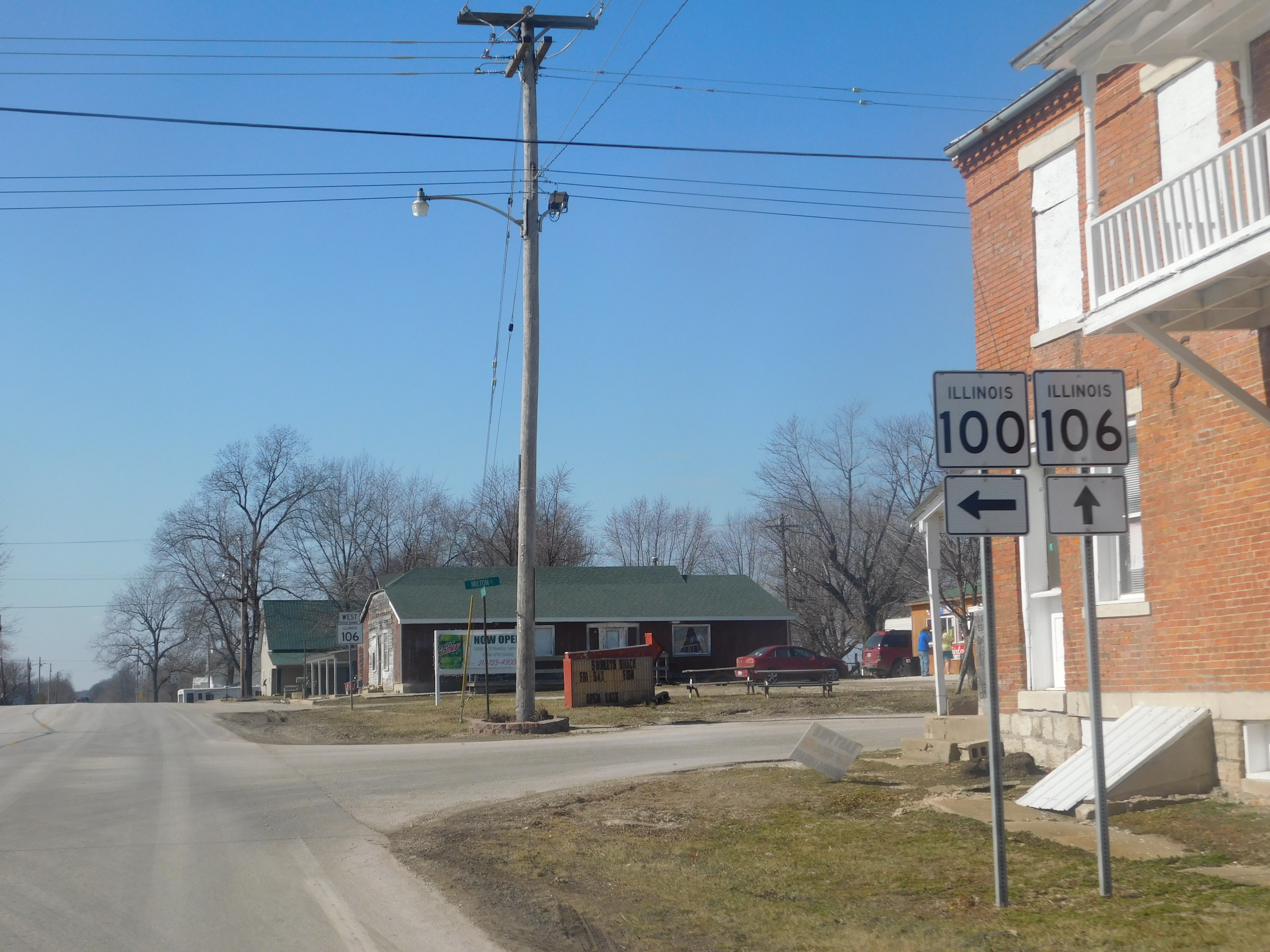
IL 100 and IL 106 at their fork in Detroit

SBI Route 106 was the current Illinois 106 from East Hannibal to Kinderhook. It was completely dropped and replaced with U.S. Route 36. In 1938, Illinois 106 was reapplied from White Hall to Winchester. It was extended west as U.S. 36 was moved onto the new freeway that would become Interstate 72. On June 28, 2012, the Florence Bridge over the Illinois River was closed for at least 9 months by IDOT due to difficulties with the lifting mechanism that allows barge traffic to pass under the bridge. Inspections suggested that continued use of the lift span could harm the structural integrity of the bridge. As barges need to pass under the bridge, the lifting span was raised up and the bridge was closed. Motorists wishing to cross the river must use the signed detour utilizing US Route 54, Interstate 72 and Illinois Route 100. Repairs were made, and the bridge reopened on April 22, 2013.

== Major intersections ==
County	Location	mi	km	Destinations	Notes
Pike	Hull	0.0	0.0	I-72 / US 36 / IL 110 (CKC) to I-172 – Hannibal, Quincy, Springfield	Western terminus; exit 1 (I-72); diamond interchange
Pike	Hull	8.1	13.0	IL 96 north / Great River Road north to I-72 / US 36 – Quincy	West end of IL 96 / Great River Road concurrency
Pike	Kinderhook	10.7	17.2	IL 96 south / Great River Road south – New Canton	East end of IL 96 / Great River Road concurrency
Pike		29.1	46.8	US 54 west – Louisiana, Mo.	West end of US 54 concurrency
Pike	Pittsfield	32.9	52.9	US 54 east (Jackson Street) to IL 107 – Jacksonville, Hannibal, Mo., Mt. Sterling, Time, Nebo	East end of US 54 concurrency
Pike	Detroit	39.9	64.2	IL 100 south / Illinois River Road (Western Branch) – Hardin	West end of IL 100 / Illinois River Road concurrency
Scott		45.5	73.2	IL 100 north / Illinois River Road – Bluffs, Springfield, Beardstown	East end of IL 100 concurrency
Scott				Illinois River Road (Eastern Branch) / 675 East / Hillview Road	East end of Illinois River Road overlap
Scott	Winchester			Jacksonville	Former US 36 east
Greene	White Hall	66.47	106.97	US 67 – Carrollton, Roodhouse	Eastern terminus
1.000 mi = 1.609 km; 1.000 km = 0.621 mi: Concurrency terminus
