= Montezuma Township =

Montezuma Township may refer to the following townships in the United States:

- Montezuma Township, Pike County, Illinois
- Montezuma Township, Gray County, Kansas

== See also ==
- Montezuma, California, a former hamlet and township in Solano County, California
