= Kinderhook Township =

Kinderhook Township may refer to the following places in the United States:

- Kinderhook Township, Pike County, Illinois
- Kinderhook Township, Michigan
