= Valley City Eagle Bridges =

Bridge in Illinois, USA

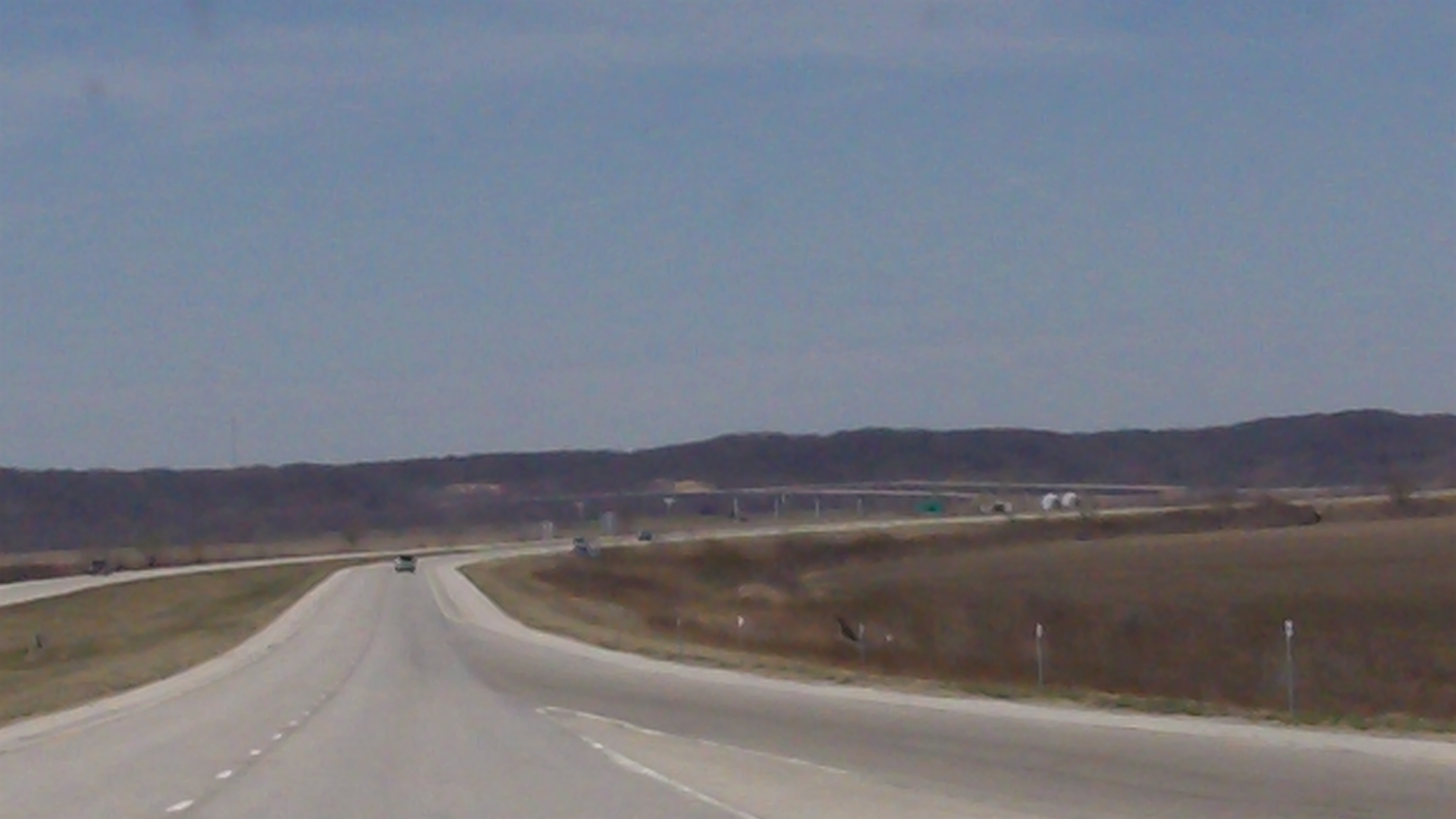
- The Valley City Eagle Bridges from westbound I-72 just past the Bluffs exit.
- Coordinates: 39.68838°N 90.64182°W
- Carries: 4 lanes of I-72 / US 36
- Crosses: Illinois River
- Maintained by: Illinois Department of Transportation

Characteristics
- Design: Concrete box girder twin bridges
- Total length: 3,203 feet (976 m)
- Width: 39 feet (12 m)

History
- Construction end: 1988
- Opened: 1992

Statistics
- Daily traffic: 4,325

Location
- Interactive map of Valley City Eagle Bridges

The Valley City Eagle Bridges is a set of bridges that carry Interstate 72 and U.S. Route 36 across the Illinois River. The bridge is located near Valley City, Illinois, the smallest municipality in the state.

== Description ==
The bridges are post tensioned cast-in-place concrete box girder bridges. Each bridge has two lanes of travel on a 39-foot deck. The bridge has roughly 7,500 travelers per day.

== History ==
The bridges were completed in 1988. The highway was not completed until 1992, when Highway 36 was rerouted onto I-72 and the older Florence Bridge began carrying Illinois Routes 100 and 106.

== See also ==
- List of crossings of the Illinois River
