= Pittsfield High School =

Pittsfield High School may refer to:

- Pittsfield High School (Illinois)
- Pittsfield High School (Massachusetts)
