= Atlas Township =

Atlas Township may refer to:

- Atlas Township, Pike County, Illinois
- Atlas Township, Michigan
