= Dutton, Illinois =

- Ghost town
- Location within Illinois Location within the United States
- Coordinates: 39°40′28″N 90°47′59″W
- Country: United States
- State: Illinois
- County: Pike
- Township: New Salem
- Elevation: 755 ft (230 m)
- Time zone: UTC-6 (CST)
  - Summer (DST): UTC-5 (CDT)
- Area code: 217

Dutton is a ghost town in New Salem Township, Pike County, in the U.S. state of Illinois.

The town derived its name from David Dutton, a county official.
