= Hardin Township, Pike County, Illinois =

Coordinates: 39°31′42″N 90°44′49″W

Hardin Township
- Township
- Location in Pike County

- Pike County's location in Illinois
- Country: United States
- State: Illinois
- County: Pike
- Established: November 8, 1853

Area
  - Total: 37.41 sq mi (96.9 km^{2})
  - Land: 37.39 sq mi (96.8 km^{2})
  - Water: 0.03 sq mi (0.078 km^{2}) 0.08%

Population (2010)
  - Estimate (2016): 206
  - Density: 5.7/sq mi (2.2/km^{2})
- Time zone: UTC-6 (CST)
  - Summer (DST): UTC-5 (CDT)
- FIPS code: 17-149-32863

Hardin Township is located in Pike County, Illinois. As of the 2010 census, its population was 212 and it contained 105 housing units.

== Geography ==
According to the 2010 census, the township encompasses an area of 37.41 square miles (96.9 km^{2}), of which 37.39 square miles (96.8 km^{2}) (or 99.95%) is land and 0.03 square miles (0.078 km^{2}) (or 0.08%) is water.

== Demographics ==
Historical population
Census	Pop.	Note	%±
2016 (est.)	206
U.S. Decennial Census
