= East Hannibal, Illinois =

- Unincorporated community
- Location within Illinois Location within the United States
- Coordinates: 39°43′47″N 91°21′04″W
- Country: United States
- State: Illinois
- County: Pike
- Elevation: 459 ft (140 m)
- Time zone: UTC-6 (Central (CST))
  - Summer (DST): UTC-5 (CDT)
- Area code: 217
- GNIS feature ID: 422650

East Hannibal is an unincorporated community in Levee Township, Pike County, in the U.S. state of Illinois. The community was named for its location east of Hannibal, Missouri.
