= Baylis, Illinois =

- Village
- Location of Baylis in Pike County, Illinois.
- Coordinates: 39°43′46″N 90°54′34″W
- Country: United States
- State: Illinois
- County: Pike
- Township: New Salem

Area
  - Total: 0.47 sq mi (1.22 km^{2})
  - Land: 0.47 sq mi (1.22 km^{2})
  - Water: 0 sq mi (0.00 km^{2})
- Elevation: 869 ft (265 m)

Population (2020)
  - Total: 172
  - Density: 365.0/sq mi (140.92/km^{2})
- Time zone: UTC-6 (CST)
  - Summer (DST): UTC-5 (CDT)
- ZIP Code(s): 62314
- Area code: 217
- FIPS code: 17-04247
- GNIS feature ID: 2398053

Baylis is a village in New Salem Township, Pike County, Illinois, United States. The population was 172 at the 2020 census.

== Geography ==
According to the 2010 census, Baylis has a total area of 0.47 square miles (1.22 km^{2}), all land.

== Demographics ==
Historical population
| Census | Pop. | Note | %± |
|---|---|---|---|
| 1890 | 368 | | — |
| 1900 | 340 | | −7.6% |
| 1910 | 385 | | 13.2% |
| 1920 | 388 | | 0.8% |
| 1930 | 352 | | −9.3% |
| 1940 | 363 | | 3.1% |
| 1950 | 307 | | −15.4% |
| 1960 | 284 | | −7.5% |
| 1970 | 307 | | 8.1% |
| 1980 | 299 | | −2.6% |
| 1990 | 257 | | −14.0% |
| 2000 | 265 | | 3.1% |
| 2010 | 205 | | −22.6% |
| 2020 | 172 | | −16.1% |
U.S. Decennial Census

As of the census of 2000, there were 265 people, 91 households, and 70 families residing in the village. The population density was 552.8 inhabitants per square mile (213.4/km^{2}). There were 106 housing units at an average density of 221.1 per square mile (85.4/km^{2}). The racial makeup of the village was 98.11% White, 0.38% Asian, and 1.51% from two or more races.

There were 91 households, out of which 44.0% had children under the age of 18 living with them, 61.5% were married couples living together, 12.1% had a female householder with no husband present, and 22.0% were non-families. 20.9% of all households were made up of individuals, and 17.6% had someone living alone who was 65 years of age or older. The average household size was 2.91 and the average family size was 3.37.

In the village, the population was spread out, with 33.6% under the age of 18, 6.4% from 18 to 24, 28.3% from 25 to 44, 18.1% from 45 to 64, and 13.6% who were 65 years of age or older. The median age was 32 years. For every 100 females, there were 92.0 males. For every 100 females age 18 and over, there were 91.3 males.

The median income for a household in the village was $32,344, and the median income for a family was $32,422. Males had a median income of $17,250 versus $17,500 for females. The per capita income for the village was $11,251. About 16.0% of families and 15.8% of the population were below the poverty line, including 16.9% of those under the age of eighteen and 3.8% of those 65 or over.
