= Pleasant Hill Township, Pike County, Illinois =

Coordinates: 39°26′47″N 90°51′18″W

Pleasant Hill Township
- Township
- Location in Pike County

- Pike County's location in Illinois
- Country: United States
- State: Illinois
- County: Pike
- Established: November 8, 1853

Area
  - Total: 37.6 sq mi (97 km^{2})
  - Land: 37.56 sq mi (97.3 km^{2})
  - Water: 0.04 sq mi (0.10 km^{2}) 0.11%

Population (2010)
  - Estimate (2016): 1,225
  - Density: 33.5/sq mi (12.9/km^{2})
- Time zone: UTC-6 (CST)
  - Summer (DST): UTC-5 (CDT)
- FIPS code: 17-149-60547

Pleasant Hill Township is located in Pike County, Illinois. As of the 2010 census, its population was 1,259 and it contained 631 housing units.

== Geography ==
According to the 2010 census, the township has a total area of 37.6 square miles (97 km^{2}), of which 37.56 square miles (97.3 km^{2}) (or 99.89%) is land and 0.04 square miles (0.10 km^{2}) (or 0.11%) is water.

== Demographics ==
Historical population
Census	Pop.	Note	%±
2016 (est.)	1,225
U.S. Decennial Census
