= Mark Twain Memorial Bridge =

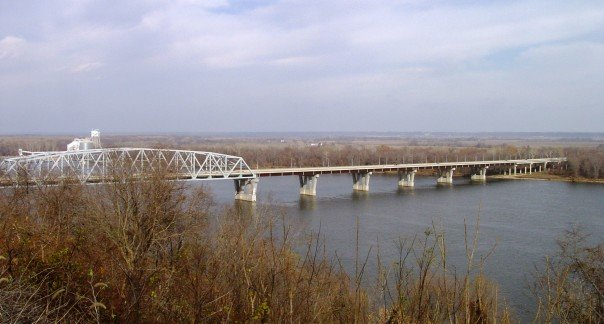
- Coordinates: 39°43′13″N 91°21′30″W
- Carries: 4 lanes of I-72 / US 36 / Route 110 (Chicago–Kansas City Expressway) / IL 110
- Crosses: Mississippi River
- Locale: Hannibal, Missouri / Levee Township, Pike County, Illinois
- Maintained by: Missouri Department of Transportation

Characteristics
- Design: Truss bridge
- Total length: 4,491 feet (1,369 m)
- Width: 86 feet (26 m)
- Longest span: 640 feet (195 m)

History
- Opened: September 16, 2000; 26 years ago

Statistics
- Daily traffic: 11,000

Location
- Interactive map of Mark Twain Memorial Bridge

The Mark Twain Memorial Bridge is a bridge over the Mississippi River at Hannibal, Missouri, childhood home of Mark Twain, for whom the bridge is named. The bridge, north of the original bridge, was finished in 2000. The bridge carries traffic for Interstate 72 and U.S. Highway 36. The state of Missouri has put up a stone picture of Twain on the Missouri side of the bridge.

The bridge opened to traffic on September 16, 2000. As part of the construction project, U.S. 36 was rerouted farther north, eliminating a dangerous sharp curve that had been on the Missouri approach. The cost of the bridge was $55 million.

== See also ==
- List of crossings of the Upper Mississippi River
