= Straut, Illinois =

- Unincorporated community
- Location within Illinois Location within the United States
- Coordinates: 39°26′36″N 90°42′21″W
- Country: United States
- State: Illinois
- County: Pike
- Elevation: 656 ft (200 m)
- Time zone: UTC-6 (Central (CST))
  - Summer (DST): UTC-5 (CDT)
- Area code: 217
- GNIS feature ID: 423212

Straut (also Stewart Station) is an unincorporated community in southern Pike County, Illinois, United States. The community is approximately four miles east of Nebo.
