= Newburg Township, Pike County, Illinois =

Coordinates: 39°37′07″N 90°45′41″W

Newburg Township
- Township
- Location in Pike County

- Pike County's location in Illinois
- Country: United States
- State: Illinois
- County: Pike
- Established: November 8, 1853

Area
  - Total: 37.55 sq mi (97.3 km^{2})
  - Land: 37.21 sq mi (96.4 km^{2})
  - Water: 0.35 sq mi (0.91 km^{2}) 0.93%

Population (2010)
  - Estimate (2016): 925
  - Density: 25.5/sq mi (9.8/km^{2})
- Time zone: UTC-6 (CST)
  - Summer (DST): UTC-5 (CDT)
- FIPS code: 17-149-52259

Newburg Township is located in Pike County, Illinois. As of the 2010 census, its population was 949 and it contained 428 housing units.

== Geography ==
According to the 2010 census, the township has a total area of 37.55 square miles (97.3 km^{2}), of which 37.21 square miles (96.4 km^{2}) (or 99.09%) is land and 0.35 square miles (0.91 km^{2}) (or 0.93%) is water.

== Demographics ==
Historical population
Census	Pop.	Note	%±
2016 (est.)	925
U.S. Decennial Census
