= Seehorn, Illinois =

Seehorn
- Unincorporated community
- Location of Seehorn within Illinois Seehorn (the United States)
- Coordinates: 39°45′19″N 91°15′41″W
- Country: United States
- State: Illinois
- County: Pike
- Elevation: 476 ft (145 m)
- Time zone: UTC-6 (CST)
  - Summer (DST): UTC-5 (CDT)
- Area code: 217
- GNIS feature ID: 0423171

Seehorn is an unincorporated community in northern Pike County, Illinois, United States.

The community lies just south of the Pike–Adams county line. It is on the eastern edge of the Mississippi River bottomlands approximately six miles northeast of Hannibal, Missouri.
