= Atlas, Illinois =

Atlas
- Unincorporated community
- Location of Atlas within Illinois Atlas (the United States)
- Coordinates: 39°30′50″N 90°58′10″W
- Country: United States
- State: Illinois
- County: Pike
- Elevation: 489 ft (149 m)
- Time zone: UTC-6 (CST)
  - Summer (DST): UTC-5 (CDT)
- GNIS feature ID: 422420

Atlas is an unincorporated community which lies at the intersection of US Route 54 and Illinois Route 96 in western Pike County, Illinois. The Illinois community of Rockport lies about 2.5 miles to the northwest along Route 96, while the city of Louisiana, Missouri, lies about six miles to the southwest across the Mississippi River.
