= Barry Township, Pike County, Illinois =

Coordinates: 39°42′40″N 91°05′26″W

Barry Township
- Township
- Location in Pike County

- Pike County's location in Illinois
- Country: United States
- State: Illinois
- County: Pike
- Established: November 8, 1853

Area
  - Total: 38.51 sq mi (99.7 km^{2})
  - Land: 38.5 sq mi (100 km^{2})
  - Water: 0.01 sq mi (0.026 km^{2}) 0.03%

Population (2010)
  - Estimate (2016): 1,615
  - Density: 43.5/sq mi (16.8/km^{2})
- Time zone: UTC-6 (CST)
  - Summer (DST): UTC-5 (CDT)
- FIPS code: 17-149-03974

Barry Township is located in Pike County, Illinois. As of the 2010 census, its population was 1,675 and it contained 791 housing units.

== Geography ==
According to the 2010 census, the township has a total area of 38.51 square miles (99.7 km^{2}), of which 38.5 square miles (100 km^{2}) (or 99.97%) is land and 0.01 square miles (0.026 km^{2}) (or 0.03%) is water.

== Demographics ==
Historical population
Census	Pop.	Note	%±
2016 (est.)	1,615
U.S. Decennial Census
