= Martinsburg Township, Pike County, Illinois =

Coordinates: 39°31′56″N 90°51′21″W

Martinsburg Township
- Township
- Location in Pike County

- Pike County's location in Illinois
- Country: United States
- State: Illinois
- County: Pike
- Established: November 8, 1853

Area
  - Total: 37.74 sq mi (97.7 km^{2})
  - Land: 37.74 sq mi (97.7 km^{2})
  - Water: 0 sq mi (0 km^{2}) 0%

Population (2010)
  - Estimate (2016): 408
  - Density: 11.1/sq mi (4.3/km^{2})
- Time zone: UTC-6 (CST)
  - Summer (DST): UTC-5 (CDT)
- FIPS code: 17-149-47241

Martinsburg Township is located in Pike County, Illinois. As of the 2010 census, its population was 419 and it contained 186 housing units.

== Geography ==
According to the 2010 census, the township has a total area of 37.74 square miles (97.7 km^{2}), all land.

== Demographics ==
Historical population
Census	Pop.	Note	%±
2016 (est.)	408
U.S. Decennial Census
