= Fairmount Township, Pike County, Illinois =

Coordinates: 39°48′07″N 90°51′40″W

Fairmount Township
- Township
- Location in Pike County

- Pike County's location in Illinois
- Country: United States
- State: Illinois
- County: Pike
- Established: November 8, 1853

Area
  - Total: 37.62 sq mi (97.4 km^{2})
  - Land: 37.62 sq mi (97.4 km^{2})
  - Water: 0 sq mi (0 km^{2}) 0%

Population (2010)
  - Estimate (2016): 183
  - Density: 5/sq mi (1.9/km^{2})
- Time zone: UTC-6 (CST)
  - Summer (DST): UTC-5 (CDT)
- FIPS code: 17-149-24972

Fairmount Township is located in Pike County, Illinois. As of the 2010 census, its population was 188 and it contained 109 housing units.

== Geography ==
According to the 2010 census, the township has a total area of 37.62 square miles (97.4 km^{2}), all land.

== Demographics ==
Historical population
Census	Pop.	Note	%±
2016 (est.)	183
U.S. Decennial Census
