= Pearl Township, Pike County, Illinois =

Coordinates: 39°26′28″N 90°39′01″W

Pearl Township
- Township
- Location in Pike County

- Pike County's location in Illinois
- Country: United States
- State: Illinois
- County: Pike
- Established: November 8, 1853

Area
  - Total: 25.26 sq mi (65.4 km^{2})
  - Land: 24.63 sq mi (63.8 km^{2})
  - Water: 0.63 sq mi (1.6 km^{2}) 2.49%

Population (2010)
  - Estimate (2016): 274
  - Density: 11.4/sq mi (4.4/km^{2})
- Time zone: UTC-6 (CST)
  - Summer (DST): UTC-5 (CDT)
- FIPS code: 17-149-58356

Pearl Township is located in Pike County, Illinois. As of the 2010 census, its population was 282 and it contained 193 housing units.

== Geography ==
According to the 2010 census, the township has a total area of 25.26 square miles (65.4 km^{2}), of which 24.63 square miles (63.8 km^{2}) (or 97.51%) is land and 0.63 square miles (1.6 km^{2}) (or 2.49%) is water.

== Demographics ==
Historical population
Census	Pop.	Note	%±
2016 (est.)	274
U.S. Decennial Census
