= Pike, Illinois =

Pike Station, Illinois
- Unincorporated community
- Location within Illinois Location within the United States
- Coordinates: 39°27′35″N 91°02′06″W
- Country: United States
- State: Illinois
- County: Pike
- Elevation: 453 ft (138 m)
- Time zone: UTC-6 (Central (CST))
  - Summer (DST): UTC-5 (CDT)
- Area code: 217

Pike Station is an unincorporated community in Pike County, Illinois, United States. Pike Station is located on the Mississippi River and U.S. Route 54 across from the city of Louisiana, Missouri.
