= Pittsfield Township, Pike County, Illinois =

Coordinates: 39°37′15″N 90°51′40″W

Pittsfield Township
- Township
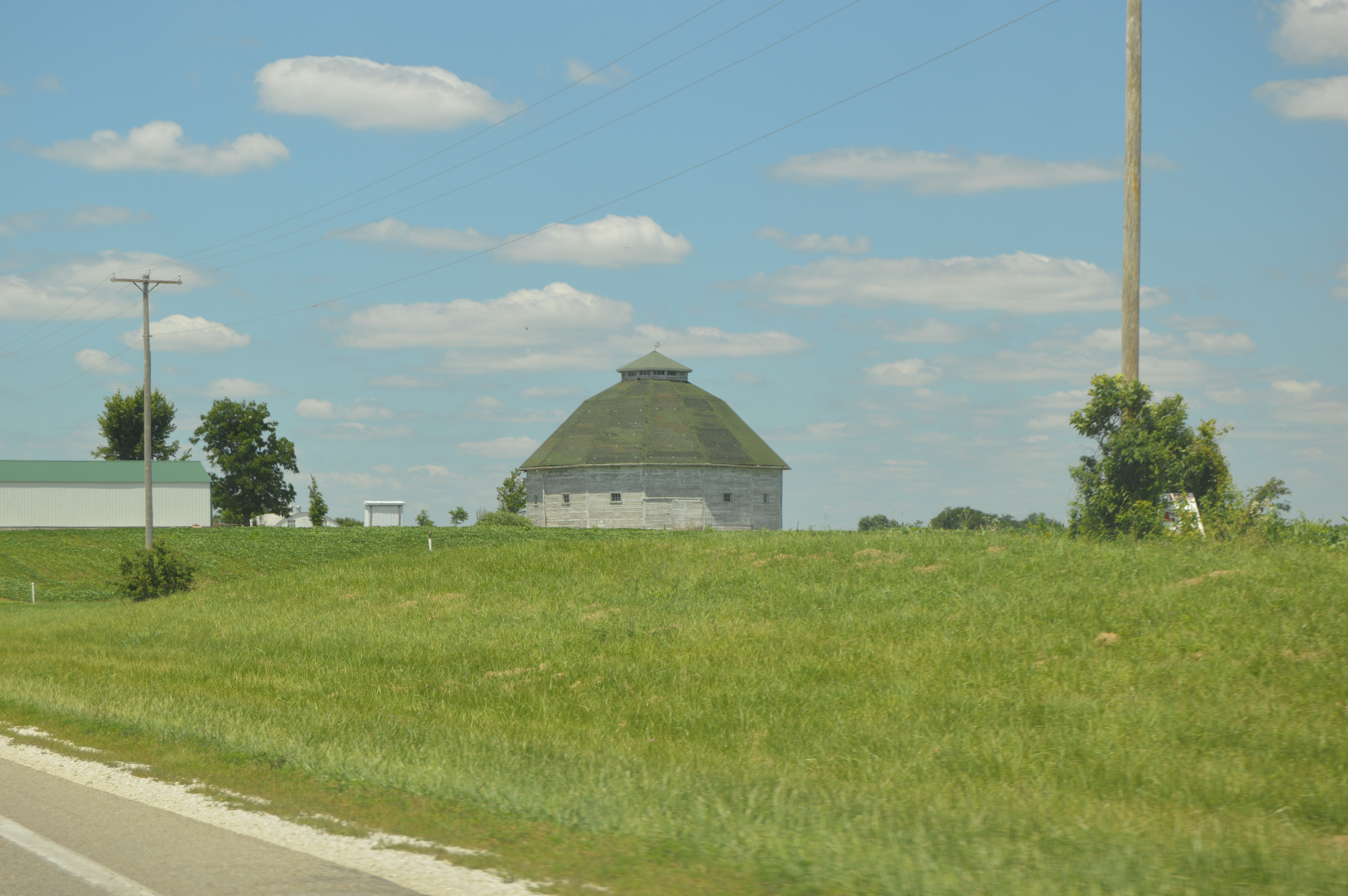
- Round barn west of Pittsfield

- Location in Pike County

- Pike County's location in Illinois
- Country: United States
- State: Illinois
- County: Pike
- Established: November 8, 1853

Area
  - Total: 37.86 sq mi (98.1 km^{2})
  - Land: 37.81 sq mi (97.9 km^{2})
  - Water: 0.06 sq mi (0.16 km^{2}) 0.16%

Population (2010)
  - Estimate (2016): 4,365
  - Density: 118.4/sq mi (45.7/km^{2})
- Time zone: UTC-6 (CST)
  - Summer (DST): UTC-5 (CDT)
- FIPS code: 17-149-60235

Pittsfield Township is located in Pike County, Illinois. As of the 2010 census, its population was 4,477 and it contained 1,982 housing units.

== Geography ==
According to the 2010 census, the township has a total area of 37.86 square miles (98.1 km^{2}), of which 37.81 square miles (97.9 km^{2}) (or 99.87%) is land and 0.06 square miles (0.16 km^{2}) (or 0.16%) is water.

== Demographics ==
Historical population
Census	Pop.	Note	%±
2016 (est.)	4,365
U.S. Decennial Census
