= El Dara, Illinois =

El Dara
- Village
- Location of El Dara in Pike County, Illinois.
- Coordinates: 39°37′22″N 90°59′45″W
- Country: United States
- State: Illinois
- County: Pike

Area
  - Total: 1.01 sq mi (2.62 km^{2})
  - Land: 1.01 sq mi (2.62 km^{2})
  - Water: 0 sq mi (0.00 km^{2})
- Elevation: 738 ft (225 m)

Population (2020)
  - Total: 63
  - Density: 62.3/sq mi (24.05/km^{2})
- Time zone: UTC-6 (CST)
  - Summer (DST): UTC-5 (CDT)
- ZIP code: 62331
- Area code: 217
- GNIS ID: 2398792
- FIPS code: 17-22957

El Dara is a village in Pike County, Illinois, United States. The population was 63 at the 2020 census, down from 78 in 2010.

== Geography ==
According to the 2010 census, El Dara has a total area of 0.97 square miles (2.51 km^{2}), all land.

== Demographics ==
Historical population
Census	Pop.	Note	%±
1880	307		—
1890	241		−21.5%
1900	249		3.3%
1910	195		−21.7%
1920	165		−15.4%
1930	149		−9.7%
1940	158		6.0%
1950	137		−13.3%
1960	98		−28.5%
1970	82		−16.3%
1980	87		6.1%
1990	94		8.0%
2000	89		−5.3%
2010	78		−12.4%
2020	63		−19.2%
U.S. Decennial Census

As of the 2000 United States census, there were 89 people, 32 households, and 24 families residing in the village. The population density was 92.0 inhabitants per square mile (35.5/km^{2}). There were 35 housing units at an average density of 36.2 per square mile (14.0/km^{2}). The racial makeup of the village was 100.00% White.

There were 32 households, out of which 37.5% had children under the age of 18 living with them, 75.0% were married couples living together, 3.1% had a female householder with no husband present, and 21.9% were non-families. 21.9% of all households were made up of individuals, and 21.9% had someone living alone who was 65 years of age or older. The average household size was 2.78 and the average family size was 3.24.

In the village, the population was spread out, with 33.7% under the age of 18, 2.2% from 18 to 24, 25.8% from 25 to 44, 23.6% from 45 to 64, and 14.6% who were 65 years of age or older. The median age was 35 years. For every 100 females, there were 74.5 males. For every 100 females age 18 and over, there were 73.5 males.

The median income for a household in the village was $36,250, and the median income for a family was $48,750. Males had a median income of $30,313 versus $15,000 for females. The per capita income for the village was $11,422. There were 7.7% of families and 9.6% of the population living below the poverty line, including 8.2% of under eighteens and 16.7% of those over 64.
