= Perry Township, Pike County, Illinois =

Coordinates: 39°47′27″N 90°44′20″W

Perry Township
- Township
- Location in Pike County

- Pike County's location in Illinois
- Country: United States
- State: Illinois
- County: Pike
- Established: November 8, 1853

Area
  - Total: 37.22 sq mi (96.4 km^{2})
  - Land: 37.21 sq mi (96.4 km^{2})
  - Water: 0.01 sq mi (0.026 km^{2}) 0.03%

Population (2010)
  - Estimate (2016): 578
  - Density: 16/sq mi (6.2/km^{2})
- Time zone: UTC-6 (CST)
  - Summer (DST): UTC-5 (CDT)
- FIPS code: 17-149-59169

Perry Township is in Pike County, Illinois. At the 2010 census, its population was 594 and it contained 310 housing units.

== Geography ==
According to the 2010 census, the township has a total area of 37.22 square miles (96.4 km^{2}), of which 37.21 square miles (96.4 km^{2}) (or 99.97%) is land and 0.01 square miles (0.026 km^{2}) (or 0.03%) is water.

== Demographics ==
Historical population
Census	Pop.	Note	%±
2016 (est.)	578
U.S. Decennial Census
