= Pike County, Illinois =

County in Illinois, United States

- County
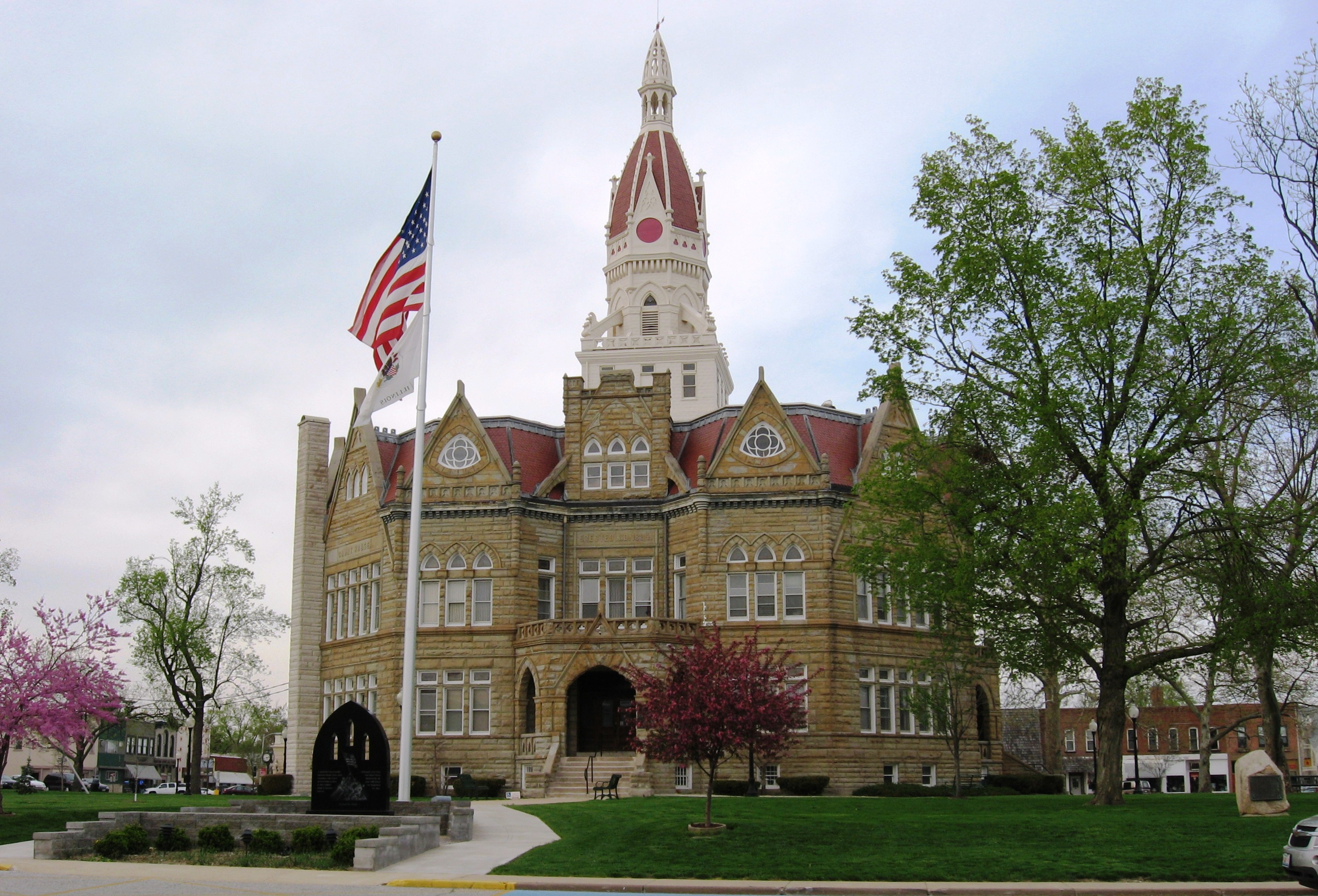
- Pike County Courthouse, Pittsfield

- Location within the U.S. state of Illinois
- Coordinates: 39°37′N 90°53′W
- Country: United States
- State: Illinois
- Founded: January 31, 1821
- Named for: Zebulon Pike
- Seat: Pittsfield
- Largest city: Pittsfield

Area
  - Total: 849 sq mi (2,200 km^{2})
  - Land: 831 sq mi (2,150 km^{2})
  - Water: 18 sq mi (47 km^{2}) 2.1%

Population (2020)
  - Total: 14,739
  - Estimate (2025): 14,231 ▼
  - Density: 17.7/sq mi (6.85/km^{2})
- Time zone: UTC−6 (Central)
  - Summer (DST): UTC−5 (CDT)
- Congressional district: 15th
- Website: www.pikecountyil.org

Pike County is a county in the U.S. state of Illinois. It is located between the Mississippi River and the Illinois River in western Illinois. According to the 2020 United States census, it had a population of 14,739. Its county seat is Pittsfield.

== History ==
Pike County was formed in January 1821 out of Edwards and Madison Counties. It was named in honor of Zebulon Pike, leader of the Pike Expedition in 1806 to map out the south and west portions of the Louisiana Purchase. Pike served at the Battle of Tippecanoe, and was killed in 1813 in the War of 1812.

Prior to the coming of the first European settler to the future Pike County, French traders, hunters, and travelers passed through the native forests and prairies. Originally Pike County began on the south junction of the Illinois and Mississippi rivers. The east boundary was the Illinois River north to the Kankakee River to the Indiana State line on north to Wisconsin territorial line and then west to the Mississippi River to the original point at the south end. The first county seat was Cole's Grove, a post town, in what later became Calhoun County. The Gazetteer of Illinois and Missouri, published in 1822, mentioned Chicago as "a village of Pike County" containing 12 or 15 houses and about 60 or 70 inhabitants.

The New Philadelphia Town Site was listed on the National Register of Historic Places in 2005, designated a National Historic Landmark in 2009, and established as a National Park in 2022. Founded by Frank McWorter, an early free black settler in Pike County, it was the first town founded by a black man in the United States. McWorter had invested in land there sight unseen after purchasing the first few members of his family out of slavery. In 1836 he founded the town of New Philadelphia, near Barry. He was elected mayor and lived there the rest of his life. With the sale of land, he made enough money to purchase the freedom of his children. After the railroad bypassed the town, its growth slowed and it was eventually abandoned in the 20th century. The town site is now an archaeological site.

In the early 21st century, Pike County acquired notability as a whitetail deer hunting center, especially for bowhunting.

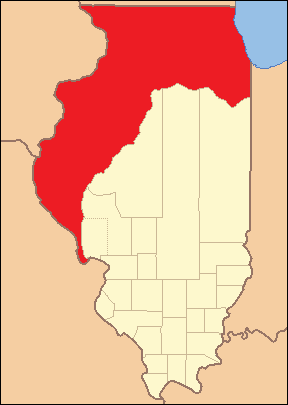
Pike County from the time of its creation to 1823

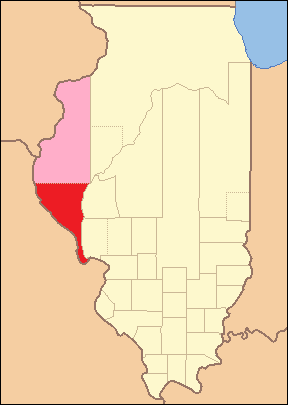
Pike County between 1823 and 1825, including unorganized territory temporarily attached to it

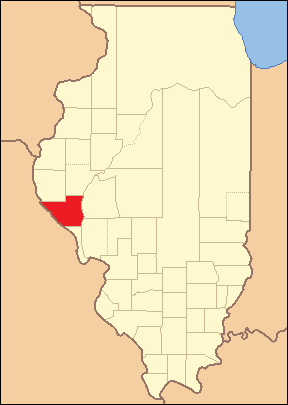
Pike County in 1825, reduced to its present borders

== Geography ==
According to the US Census Bureau, the county has a total area of 849 square miles (2,200 km^{2}), of which 831 square miles (2,150 km^{2}) is land and 18 square miles (47 km^{2}) (2.1%) is water.

Pike County is located on the highlands between the Illinois River, which forms its eastern border, and the Mississippi River, which borders Missouri. It has two interstate highways, I-72, with bridges spanning both rivers to enter the county, and I-172 which extends about 300 feet (91 m) into the county to its intersection with I-72.

=== Climate and weather ===
Pittsfield, Illinois

Climate chart (precipitation, max. and min. temperature)
J	F	M	A	M	J	J	A	S	O	N	D
1.7 33 15	1.8 40 20	3.2 51 30	3.9 64 42	4.1 74 52	3.3 82 62	4.1 86 66	3 85 63	3.2 78 54	2.9 66 43	3.4 51 31	2.6 38 21
- █ Average max. and min. temperatures in °F
- █ Precipitation totals in inches
- Source: The Weather Channel
Metric conversion
J	F	M	A	M	J	J	A	S	O	N	D
44 1 −9	45 4 −7	81 11 −1	99 18 6	104 23 11	84 28 17	103 30 19	77 29 17	82 26 12	72 19 6	86 11 −1	66 3 −6
- █ Average max. and min. temperatures in °C
- █ Precipitation totals in mm

In recent years, average temperatures in the county seat of Pittsfield have ranged from a low of 15 °F (−9 °C) in January to a high of 86 °F (30 °C) in July, although a record low of −25 °F (−32 °C) was recorded in February 1905 and a record high of 115 °F (46 °C) was recorded in July 1954. Average monthly precipitation ranged from 1.74 inches (44 mm) in January to 4.11 inches (104 mm) in May.

=== Major highways ===
- I-72
- I-172
- US 36
- US 54
- IL 57
- IL 96
- IL 99
- IL 100
- IL 104
- IL 106
- IL 107
- IL 110 (CKC)

=== Adjacent counties ===
- Adams County – north
- Brown County – northeast
- Scott County – east
- Morgan County – east
- Greene County – southeast
- Calhoun County – south
- Pike County, Missouri – southwest
- Ralls County, Missouri – west
- Marion County, Missouri – northwest

Pike County is one of the few US counties to border as many as nine counties. Illinois has two – Pike and LaSalle.

=== National protected area ===
- Great River National Wildlife Refuge (part)

== Demographics ==
Historical population
Census	Pop.	Note	%±
1830	2,396		—
1840	11,728		389.5%
1850	18,819		60.5%
1860	27,249		44.8%
1870	30,768		12.9%
1880	33,751		9.7%
1890	31,000		−8.2%
1900	31,595		1.9%
1910	28,622		−9.4%
1920	26,866		−6.1%
1930	24,357		−9.3%
1940	25,340		4.0%
1950	22,155		−12.6%
1960	20,552		−7.2%
1970	19,185		−6.7%
1980	18,896		−1.5%
1990	17,577		−7.0%
2000	17,384		−1.1%
2010	16,430		−5.5%
2020	14,739		−10.3%
2025 (est.)	14,231	▼	−3.4%
US Decennial Census; 1790-1960 1900-1990; 1990-2000 2010

=== 2020 census ===
As of the 2020 census, the county had a population of 14,739. The median age was 43.0 years. 22.7% of residents were under the age of 18 and 22.7% of residents were 65 years of age or older. For every 100 females there were 98.1 males, and for every 100 females age 18 and over there were 95.7 males age 18 and over.

The racial makeup of the county was 94.8% White, 0.5% Black or African American, 0.3% American Indian and Alaska Native, 0.3% Asian, <0.1% Native Hawaiian and Pacific Islander, 0.7% from some other race, and 3.4% from two or more races. Hispanic or Latino residents of any race comprised 1.8% of the population.

<0.1% of residents lived in urban areas, while 100.0% lived in rural areas.

There were 6,138 households in the county, of which 27.6% had children under the age of 18 living in them. Of all households, 49.1% were married-couple households, 18.5% were households with a male householder and no spouse or partner present, and 25.1% were households with a female householder and no spouse or partner present. About 30.5% of all households were made up of individuals and 15.6% had someone living alone who was 65 years of age or older.

There were 7,260 housing units, of which 15.5% were vacant. Among occupied housing units, 77.4% were owner-occupied and 22.6% were renter-occupied. The homeowner vacancy rate was 2.2% and the rental vacancy rate was 12.9%.

=== Racial and ethnic composition ===
Pike County, Illinois – Racial and ethnic composition Note: the US Census treats Hispanic/Latino as an ethnic category. This table excludes Latinos from the racial categories and assigns them to a separate category. Hispanics/Latinos may be of any race.
Race / Ethnicity (NH = Non-Hispanic)	Pop 1980	Pop 1990	Pop 2000	Pop 2010	Pop 2020	% 1980	% 1990	% 2000	% 2010	% 2020
White alone (NH)	18,760	17,444	16,868	15,802	13,874	99.28%	99.24%	97.03%	96.18%	94.13%
Black or African American alone (NH)	9	8	260	274	63	0.05%	0.05%	1.50%	1.67%	0.43%
Native American or Alaska Native alone (NH)	23	24	29	24	33	0.12%	0.14%	0.17%	0.15%	0.22%
Asian alone (NH)	20	32	41	38	43	0.11%	0.18%	0.24%	0.23%	0.29%
Native Hawaiian or Pacific Islander alone (NH)	x	x	5	4	6	x	x	0.03%	0.02%	0.04%
Other race alone (NH)	8	0	5	4	20	0.04%	0.00%	0.03%	0.02%	0.14%
Mixed race or Multiracial (NH)	x	x	89	112	438	x	x	0.51%	0.68%	2.97%
Hispanic or Latino (any race)	76	69	87	172	262	0.40%	0.39%	0.50%	1.05%	1.78%
Total	18,896	17,577	17,384	16,430	14,739	100.00%	100.00%	100.00%	100.00%	100.00%

=== 2010 census ===
As of the 2010 United States census, there were 16,430 people, 6,639 households, and 4,527 families residing in the county. The population density was 19.8 inhabitants per square mile (7.6/km^{2}). There were 7,951 housing units at an average density of 9.6 per square mile (3.7/km^{2}). The racial makeup of the county was 96.9% white, 1.7% black or African American, 0.2% Asian, 0.2% American Indian, 0.2% from other races, and 0.7% from two or more races. Those of Hispanic or Latino origin made up 1.0% of the population. In terms of ancestry, 26.3% were German, 16.8% were American, 15.1% were English, and 13.4% were Irish.

Of the 6,639 households, 30.3% had children under the age of 18 living with them, 54.5% were married couples living together, 9.0% had a female householder with no husband present, 31.8% were non-families, and 27.8% of all households were made up of individuals. The average household size was 2.38 and the average family size was 2.87. The median age was 42.5 years.

The median income for a household in the county was $40,205 and the median income for a family was $50,426. Males had a median income of $39,071 versus $26,835 for females. The per capita income for the county was $19,996. About 11.3% of families and 15.4% of the population were below the poverty line, including 23.7% of those under age 18 and 11.2% of those age 65 or over.

== Politics ==
Pike County was reliably Democratic from 1892 through 1948; only 2 Republican Party nominees carried the county vote during that period. However, it was a national bellwether in every presidential election from 1912 to 2004 aside from 1924 & 1988. Since 2000, the county has become a Republican stronghold, with Donald Trump winning it in the 2016 presidential election by a margin of 57.6 points.

The county is located in Illinois's 15th Congressional District and is currently represented by Republican Mary Miller. In the Illinois General Assembly, the county is located in the 50th legislative district and the 100th house district represented by Senator Steve McClure and Representative C. D. Davidsmeyer.

United States presidential election results for Pike County, Illinois
Year	Republican		Democratic		Third party(ies)	
Year	No.	%	No.	%	No.	%
1892	2,751	36.62%	3,494	46.51%	1,268	16.88%
1896	3,111	36.26%	5,329	62.12%	139	1.62%
1900	3,045	38.01%	4,715	58.85%	252	3.15%
1904	3,007	44.42%	3,112	45.97%	650	9.60%
1908	2,932	40.36%	3,859	53.12%	474	6.52%
1912	1,169	17.65%	3,371	50.90%	2,083	31.45%
1916	5,293	41.35%	7,005	54.73%	501	3.91%
1920	5,564	54.12%	4,279	41.62%	437	4.25%
1924	4,989	45.59%	5,424	49.57%	530	4.84%
1928	6,705	61.88%	4,008	36.99%	123	1.14%
1932	4,181	33.58%	8,013	64.35%	258	2.07%
1936	5,589	40.00%	8,187	58.59%	198	1.42%
1940	6,619	45.83%	7,676	53.15%	146	1.01%
1944	5,633	48.85%	5,833	50.58%	66	0.57%
1948	4,722	45.00%	5,674	54.07%	98	0.93%
1952	6,382	54.97%	5,219	44.95%	10	0.09%
1956	5,920	52.31%	5,382	47.55%	16	0.14%
1960	5,965	52.16%	5,461	47.75%	10	0.09%
1964	4,113	38.48%	6,576	61.52%	0	0.00%
1968	5,035	50.66%	4,191	42.17%	713	7.17%
1972	5,940	60.23%	3,883	39.37%	40	0.41%
1976	4,975	49.21%	5,006	49.52%	129	1.28%
1980	5,301	56.63%	3,695	39.47%	365	3.90%
1984	5,295	57.03%	3,965	42.70%	25	0.27%
1988	3,965	46.11%	4,614	53.66%	20	0.23%
1992	3,342	36.98%	4,016	44.44%	1,679	18.58%
1996	3,225	40.56%	3,604	45.32%	1,123	14.12%
2000	4,706	58.01%	3,198	39.42%	208	2.56%
2004	5,032	63.06%	2,849	35.70%	99	1.24%
2008	4,457	58.31%	3,024	39.57%	162	2.12%
2012	4,860	66.56%	2,278	31.20%	164	2.25%
2016	5,754	76.41%	1,413	18.76%	363	4.82%
2020	6,332	79.50%	1,484	18.63%	149	1.87%
2024	6,086	80.88%	1,302	17.30%	137	1.82%

== Education ==
School districts include:

- Griggsville-Perry Community Unit School District 4
- Liberty Community Unit School District 2
- Meredosia-Chambersburg Community Unit School District 11
- Pikeland Community Unit School District 10
- Pleasant Hill Community Unit School District 3
- Western Community Unit School District 12

== Communities ==
=== Settlements ===
Settlement	Population	Type	Townships
Barry	1,303	City	Barry
Baylis	172	Village	New Salem
Detroit	76	Village	Detroit
El Dara	63	Village	Derry
Florence	17	Village	Detroit
Griggsville	1,097	City	Griggsville
Hull	392	Village	Kinderhook
Kinderhook	189	Village	Barry, Kinderhook
Milton	214	Village	Montezuma
Nebo	282	Village	Spring Creek
New Canton	334	Town	Pleasant Vale
New Salem	121	Village	New Salem
Pearl	103	Village	Pearl
Perry	314	Village	Perry
Pittsfield†	4,206	City	Newburg, Pittsfield
Pleasant Hill	924	Village	Pleasant Hill
Rockport	67	CDP	Atlas
Time	26	Village	Hardin
Valley City	14	Village	Flint

† – County seat

=== Townships ===
Township	Population	Housing Units	Total Area	Land Area	Water Area
Atlas	468	251	67.88 mi^{2} (175.8 km^{2})	63.71 mi^{2} (165.0 km^{2})	4.17 mi^{2} (10.8 km^{2})
Barry	1,605	745	38.51 mi^{2} (99.7 km^{2})	38.50 mi^{2} (99.7 km^{2})	0.01 mi^{2} (0.026 km^{2})
Chambersburg	124	78	29.63 mi^{2} (76.7 km^{2})	29.09 mi^{2} (75.3 km^{2})	0.54 mi^{2} (1.4 km^{2})
Cincinnati	34	13	26.73 mi^{2} (69.2 km^{2})	23.82 mi^{2} (61.7 km^{2})	2.91 mi^{2} (7.5 km^{2})
Derry	214	98	37.40 mi^{2} (96.9 km^{2})	37.40 mi^{2} (96.9 km^{2})	0.00 mi^{2} (0 km^{2})
Detroit	263	149	26.98 mi^{2} (69.9 km^{2})	26.24 mi^{2} (68.0 km^{2})	0.74 mi^{2} (1.9 km^{2})
Fairmount	149	88	37.62 mi^{2} (97.4 km^{2})	37.62 mi^{2} (97.4 km^{2})	0.00 mi^{2} (0 km^{2})
Flint	89	40	16.17 mi^{2} (41.9 km^{2})	15.31 mi^{2} (39.7 km^{2})	0.86 mi^{2} (2.2 km^{2})
Griggsville	1,310	610	37.64 mi^{2} (97.5 km^{2})	37.64 mi^{2} (97.5 km^{2})	0.00 mi^{2} (0 km^{2})
Hadley	219	115	36.86 mi^{2} (95.5 km^{2})	36.84 mi^{2} (95.4 km^{2})	0.02 mi^{2} (0.052 km^{2})
Hardin	212	105	37.41 mi^{2} (96.9 km^{2})	37.39 mi^{2} (96.8 km^{2})	0.02 mi^{2} (0.052 km^{2})
Kinderhook	741	369	37.91 mi^{2} (98.2 km^{2})	37.86 mi^{2} (98.1 km^{2})	0.05 mi^{2} (0.13 km^{2})
Levee	54	26	25.03 mi^{2} (64.8 km^{2})	22.02 mi^{2} (57.0 km^{2})	3.01 mi^{2} (7.8 km^{2})
Martinsburg	360	167	37.74 mi^{2} (97.7 km^{2})	37.74 mi^{2} (97.7 km^{2})	0.00 mi^{2} (0 km^{2})
Montezuma	417	222	34.45 mi^{2} (89.2 km^{2})	33.75 mi^{2} (87.4 km^{2})	0.70 mi^{2} (1.8 km^{2})
Newburg	967	425	37.55 mi^{2} (97.3 km^{2})	37.21 mi^{2} (96.4 km^{2})	0.35 mi^{2} (0.91 km^{2})
New Salem	515	245	38.21 mi^{2} (99.0 km^{2})	38.21 mi^{2} (99.0 km^{2})	0.00 mi^{2} (0 km^{2})
Pearl	197	148	25.26 mi^{2} (65.4 km^{2})	24.63 mi^{2} (63.8 km^{2})	0.63 mi^{2} (1.6 km^{2})
Perry	522	283	37.22 mi^{2} (96.4 km^{2})	37.21 mi^{2} (96.4 km^{2})	0.01 mi^{2} (0.026 km^{2})
Pittsfield	4,037	1,954	37.86 mi^{2} (98.1 km^{2})	37.81 mi^{2} (97.9 km^{2})	0.06 mi^{2} (0.16 km^{2})
Pleasant Hill	1,205	579	37.60 mi^{2} (97.4 km^{2})	37.56 mi^{2} (97.3 km^{2})	0.04 mi^{2} (0.10 km^{2})
Pleasant Vale	484	263	67.88 mi^{2} (175.8 km^{2})	63.71 mi^{2} (165.0 km^{2})	4.17 mi^{2} (10.8 km^{2})
Ross	64	32	38.98 mi^{2} (101.0 km^{2})	38.97 mi^{2} (100.9 km^{2})	0.01 mi^{2} (0.026 km^{2})
Spring Creek	489	255	37.41 mi^{2} (96.9 km^{2})	37.40 mi^{2} (96.9 km^{2})	0.01 mi^{2} (0.026 km^{2})

- Atlas Township
- Barry Township
- Chambersburg Township
- Cincinnati Township
- Derry Township
- Detroit Township
- Fairmount Township
- Flint Township
- Griggsville Township
- Hadley Township
- Hardin Township
- Kinderhook Township
- Levee Township
- Martinsburg Township
- Montezuma Township
- Newburg Township
- New Salem Township
- Pearl Township
- Perry Township
- Pittsfield Township
- Pleasant Hill Township
- Pleasant Vale Township
- Ross Township
- Spring Creek Township

=== Unincorporated communities ===
- Atlas
- Bedford
- Chambersburg
- East Hannibal
- Fishhook
- Maysville
- New Hartford
- Pike Station
- Seehorn
- Straut
- Summer Hill

=== Ghost towns ===
- Dutton
- Griggsville Landing
- New Philadelphia

== See also ==
- National Register of Historic Places listings in Pike County, Illinois
