= Montezuma Township, Pike County, Illinois =

Coordinates: 39°32′N 90°38′W

Montezuma Township
- Township
- Location in Pike County

- Pike County's location in Illinois
- Country: United States
- State: Illinois
- County: Pike
- Established: November 8, 1853

Area
  - Total: 34.45 sq mi (89.2 km^{2})
  - Land: 33.75 sq mi (87.4 km^{2})
  - Water: 0.7 sq mi (1.8 km^{2}) 2.03%

Population (2010)
  - Estimate (2016): 526
  - Density: 16/sq mi (6.2/km^{2})
- Time zone: UTC-6 (CST)
  - Summer (DST): UTC-5 (CDT)
- FIPS code: 17-149-50192

Montezuma Township is located in Pike County, Illinois. As of the 2010 census, its population was 540 and it contained 254 housing units.

It is located in Township 6 South, Range 2 West of the 3rd Principal Meridian. Villages include Bedford, Greenpond, Milton and Montezuma.

== Geography ==
According to the 2010 census, the township has a total area of 34.45 square miles (89.2 km^{2}), of which 33.75 square miles (87.4 km^{2}) (or 97.97%) is land and 0.7 square miles (1.8 km^{2}) (or 2.03%) is water.

== Demographics ==
Historical population
Census	Pop.	Note	%±
2016 (est.)	526
U.S. Decennial Census
