= Rockport, Illinois =

Rockport
- Unincorporated community
- Location of Rockport within Illinois Rockport (the United States)
- Coordinates: 39°32′21″N 91°00′46″W
- Country: United States
- State: Illinois
- County: Pike
- Elevation: 489 ft (149 m)
- Time zone: UTC-6 (CST)
  - Summer (DST): UTC-5 (CDT)
- ZIP code: 62370
- Area code: 217
- GNIS feature ID: 2806557

Rockport is an unincorporated community in western Pike County, Illinois, United States. As of the 2020 census, Rockport had a population of 67. The community is on Illinois Route 96 about eight miles southeast of New Canton.

== Demographics ==
Rockport first appeared as a census designated place in the 2020 U.S. census.
