= Island Grove Township, Sangamon County, Illinois =

Coordinates: 39°45′43″N 89°53′59″W

Island Grove Township
- Township
- Location in Sangamon County

- Sangamon County's location in Illinois
- Country: United States
- State: Illinois
- County: Sangamon
- Established: November 6, 1860

Area
  - Total: 28.15 sq mi (72.9 km^{2})
  - Land: 28.15 sq mi (72.9 km^{2})
  - Water: 0 sq mi (0 km^{2}) 0%

Population (2010)
  - Estimate (2016): 613
  - Density: 22.1/sq mi (8.5/km^{2})
- Time zone: UTC-6 (CST)
  - Summer (DST): UTC-5 (CDT)
- FIPS code: 17-167-37881

Island Grove Township is located in Sangamon County, Illinois. As of the 2010 census, its population was 621 and it contained 273 housing units.

== Geography ==
According to the 2010 census, the township has a total area of 28.15 square miles (72.9 km^{2}), all land.

== Demographics ==
Historical population
Census	Pop.	Note	%±
2016 (est.)	613
U.S. Decennial Census
