= Time, Illinois =

Time
- Village
- Location of Time in Pike County, Illinois.
- Coordinates: 39°33′40″N 90°43′25″W
- Country: United States
- State: Illinois
- County: Pike

Area
  - Total: 0.25 sq mi (0.66 km^{2})
  - Land: 0.25 sq mi (0.66 km^{2})
  - Water: 0 sq mi (0.00 km^{2})
- Elevation: 692 ft (211 m)

Population (2020)
  - Total: 26
  - Density: 102.4/sq mi (39.54/km^{2})
- Time zone: UTC-6 (CST)
  - Summer (DST): UTC-5 (CDT)
- ZIP code: 62363
- Area code: 217
- FIPS code: 17-75419
- GNIS feature ID: 2399985

Time was a village in Pike County, Illinois, United States, disestablished in 2022. As of the 2020 census, Time had a population of 26.

== History ==
Time was a village in the Midwestern United States, in the West Central region of Illinois. It was established as a village in 1857 in Hardin Township, which was then located in Pike County, Illinois. The slogan for the village, created in 1910, was "Time marches on 1857-2007." It thrived during the 20th century but later met a decline. For an extended period of time, the Dyer family was very prominent. This family is the ancestors of the Pittsfield resident Richard Dyer.

When the censuses began in 1880, there were 182 members of the community. There were also 4 stores, 2 wagons, a blacksmith shop, and a flouring mill. The popularity of the community has slowly declined and in the 2010 census, there were only 22 community members. They reside under a village president. The current village president is Joe Chiatello.

The town was a religious outlet for members of the surrounding community. It originally contained a Methodist and Christian church. This was later reduced to the current Time community church under the leadership of pastor Musgrove.

One of the possessions of the township was the bandstand which is located on the square next to the shelter house. The bandstand was established around the years of 1906 and 1907. This housed the concerts of the brass band that was known around the county in the 19th and 20th century. It also had a string band in 1867. Time was also known for its invention of the granitoid sidewalk.

As for the schooling, there was a two room brick schoolhouse. This school still resides on the east side of the village and is no longer in use. It has been vacant since 1950. It is just west of the cemetery. The village is also known for its croquet course. It was found in the square, alongside the bandstand. This sport was available to the residents until 1910.

== Geography ==
According to the 2010 census, Time has a total area of 0.44 square miles (1.14 km^{2}), all land.

== Demographics ==
Historical population
Census	Pop.	Note	%±
1880	182		—
1890	146		−19.8%
1900	125		−14.4%
1910	158		26.4%
1920	95		−39.9%
1930	74		−22.1%
1940	52		−29.7%
1950	57		9.6%
1960	45		−21.1%
1970	39		−13.3%
1980	27		−30.8%
1990	36		33.3%
2000	29		−19.4%
2010	23		−20.7%
2020	26		13.0%
U.S. Decennial Census

As of the census of 2000, there were 29 people, 13 households, and 7 families residing in the village. The population density was 66.5 inhabitants per square mile (25.7/km^{2}). There were 14 housing units at an average density of 32.1 per square mile (12.4/km^{2}). The racial makeup of the village was 100.00% White.

There were 13 households, out of which 23.1% had children under the age of 18 living with them, 46.2% were married couples living together, 15.4% had a female householder with no husband present, and 38.5% were non-families. 30.8% of all households were made up of individuals, and 23.1% had someone living alone who was 65 years of age or older. The average household size was 2.23 and the average family size was 2.75.

In the village, the population was spread out, with 10.3% under the age of 18, 10.3% from 18 to 24, 24.1% from 25 to 44, 34.5% from 45 to 64, and 20.7% who were 65 years of age or older. The median age was 46 years. For every 100 females, there were 93.3 males. For every 100 females age 18 and over, there were 85.7 males.

The median income for a household in the village was $14,375, and the median income for a family was $33,750. Males had a median income of $38,750 versus $13,750 for females. The per capita income for the village was $12,253. There were no families and 5.3% of the population living below the poverty line, including no under eighteens and none of those over 64.

== Culture ==
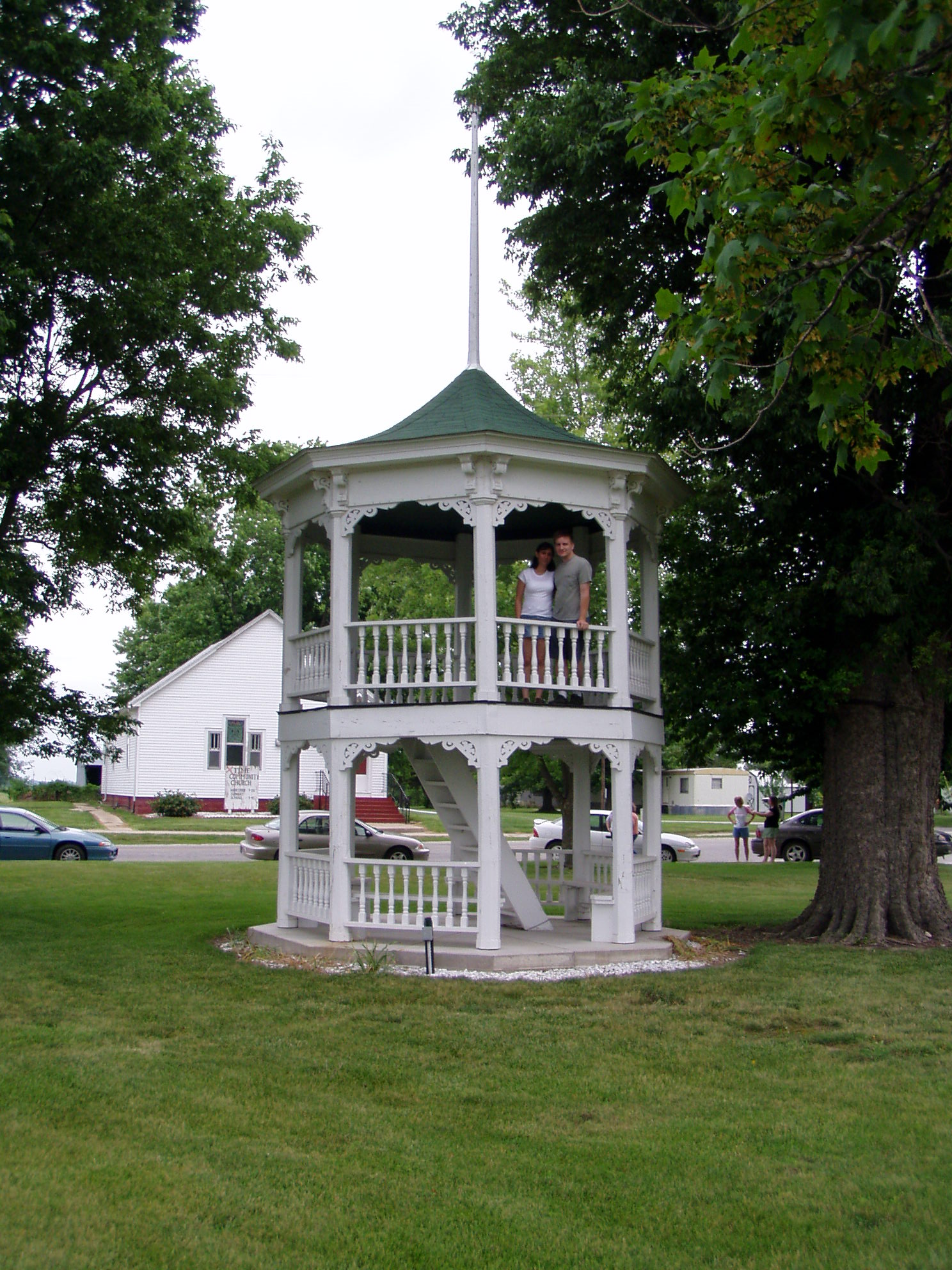
Band Stand, Time Square

In the past, Time was a popular tourist location in Illinois during the annual "Fall Color Tour" and "Ice Cream Social" celebrations, centered on the historic Band Stand in Time Square. Time had a thriving local tourist economy during these events under the supervision of former mayor Richard Perry.

Science writer Rebecca Boyle visited the village for her 2018 essay "Heartland Driving is Good for the Soul." She published with it a picture of a road sign pointing to Time. She mentioned visiting its bandstand and thinking "about why mid-19th-century Americans would name a town Time..."

=== Public architecture ===
The Time band stand is (2012) a classic example of a public park gazebo.
