= New Salem, Pike County, Illinois =

New Salem
- Village
- Location of New Salem in Illinois
- Coordinates: 39°42′28″N 90°50′52″W
- Country: United States
- State: Illinois
- County: Pike
- Township: New Salem

Area
  - Total: 1.05 sq mi (2.72 km^{2})
  - Land: 1.05 sq mi (2.72 km^{2})
  - Water: 0 sq mi (0.00 km^{2})
- Elevation: 787 ft (240 m)

Population (2020)
  - Total: 121
  - Density: 115.3/sq mi (44.53/km^{2})
- Time zone: UTC-6 (CST)
  - Summer (DST): UTC-5 (CDT)
- Area code: 217
- FIPS code: 17-52805
- GNIS feature ID: 2399482

New Salem is a village in Pike County, Illinois, United States. The population was 136 at the 2000 census.

== Geography ==
According to the 2010 census, the village has a total area of 1.05 square miles (2.7 km^{2}), all land.

== Demographics ==
Historical population
Census	Pop.	Note	%±
1870	316		—
1880	175		−44.6%
1890	307		75.4%
1900	290		−5.5%
1910	260		−10.3%
1920	262		0.8%
1930	206		−21.4%
1940	257		24.8%
1950	184		−28.4%
1960	172		−6.5%
1970	165		−4.1%
1980	170		3.0%
1990	147		−13.5%
2000	136		−7.5%
2010	137		0.7%
2020	121		−11.7%
U.S. Decennial Census

As of the census of 2000, there were 136 people, 53 households, and 35 families residing in the village. The population density was 130.4 inhabitants per square mile (50.3/km^{2}). There were 67 housing units at an average density of 64.3 per square mile (24.8/km^{2}). The racial makeup of the village was 99.26% White, 0.74% from other races.

There were 53 households, out of which 30.2% had children under the age of 18 living with them, 56.6% were married couples living together, 5.7% had a female householder with no husband present, and 32.1% were non-families. 22.6% of all households were made up of individuals, and 15.1% had someone living alone who was 65 years of age or older. The average household size was 2.49 and the average family size was 2.97.

In the village, the population was spread out, with 26.5% under the age of 18, 6.6% from 18 to 24, 23.5% from 25 to 44, 25.0% from 45 to 64, and 18.4% who were 65 years of age or older. The median age was 40 years. For every 100 females, there were 76.6 males. For every 100 females age 18 and over, there were 81.8 males.

The median income for a household in the village was $27,917, and the median income for a family was $26,875. Males had a median income of $20,625 versus $16,250 for females. The per capita income for the village was $19,351. There were 21.6% of families and 24.7% of the population living below the poverty line, including 47.1% of under eighteens and 4.2% of those over 64.
