= Atlas Township, Pike County, Illinois =

Coordinates: 39°31′40″N 91°00′47″W

Atlas Township
- Township
- Location in Pike County

- Pike County's location in Illinois
- Country: United States
- State: Illinois
- County: Pike
- Established: November 6, 1849

Area
  - Total: 67.88 sq mi (175.8 km^{2})
  - Land: 63.71 sq mi (165.0 km^{2})
  - Water: 4.17 sq mi (10.8 km^{2}) 6.14%

Population (2010)
  - Estimate (2016): 548
  - Density: 8.8/sq mi (3.4/km^{2})
- Time zone: UTC-6 (CST)
  - Summer (DST): UTC-5 (CDT)
- FIPS code: 17-149-02791

Atlas Township is located in Pike County, Illinois. As of the 2010 census, its population was 563 and it contained 321 housing units.

== Geography ==
According to the 2010 census, the township has a total area of 67.88 square miles (175.8 km^{2}), of which 63.71 square miles (165.0 km^{2}) (or 93.86%) is land and 4.17 square miles (10.8 km^{2}) (or 6.14%) is water.

== Demographics ==
Historical population
Census	Pop.	Note	%±
2016 (est.)	548
U.S. Decennial Census

According to the census of 2017, the population is 417.
