= Levee Township, Pike County, Illinois =

Coordinates: 39°43′33″N 91°18′21″W

Levee Township
- Township
- Location in Pike County

- Pike County's location in Illinois
- Country: United States
- State: Illinois
- County: Pike
- Established: November 1875

Area
  - Total: 25.03 sq mi (64.8 km^{2})
  - Land: 22.02 sq mi (57.0 km^{2})
  - Water: 3.01 sq mi (7.8 km^{2}) 12.03%

Population (2010)
  - Estimate (2016): 46
  - Density: 2.1/sq mi (0.81/km^{2})
- Time zone: UTC-6 (CST)
  - Summer (DST): UTC-5 (CDT)
- FIPS code: 17-149-43003

Levee Township is located in Pike County, Illinois. As of the 2010 census, its population was 47 and it contained 39 housing units. Levee formed as Douglas Township from Pike Township in November 1875. Douglas changed its name to Levee in April, 1876.

== Geography ==
According to the 2010 census, the township has a total area of 25.03 square miles (64.8 km^{2}), of which 22.02 square miles (57.0 km^{2}) (or 87.97%) is land and 3.01 square miles (7.8 km^{2}) (or 12.03%) is water.

== Demographics ==
Historical population
| Census | Pop. | Note | %± |
|---|---|---|---|
| 2016 (est.) | 46 |
U.S. Decennial Census
