= List of U.S. Highways in Illinois =

United States Numbered Highway System in Illinois
- Standard Illinois U.S. Highway markers

System information
- Maintained by IDOT, ISTHA, and CDOT
- Formed: November 11, 1926

Highway names
- Interstates: Interstate X (I-X)
- US Highways: U.S. Route X (US X)
- State: Illinois Route X (IL X)

System links
- Illinois State Highway System; Interstate; US; State; Tollways; Scenic

This is a list of U.S. Highways in Illinois, all of which are owned and maintained by the U.S. state of Illinois. The Illinois Department of Transportation (IDOT) is responsible for maintaining the U.S Highways in Illinois. The system in Illinois consists of 20 primary highways.

== Mainline highways ==
| Number | Length (mi) | Length (km) | Southern or western terminus | Northern or eastern terminus | Formed | Removed | Notes |
|---|---|---|---|---|---|---|---|
| US 6 | 179.88 | 289.49 | I-74/US 6 in Moline | I-80/I-94/US 6 in Lansing | 1932 | current | Grand Army of the Republic Highway |
| US 12 | 85.14 | 137.02 | US 12 near Richmond | US 12/US 20/US 41 in Chicago | 1928 | current | |
| US 14 | 69.55 | 111.93 | US 14 near Harvard | US 41 in Chicago | 1933 | current | Ronald Reagan Highway / Northwest Highway |
| US 20 | 233.93 | 376.47 | US 20 in East Dubuque | US 12/US 20/US 41 in Chicago | 1926 | current | Ulysses S. Grant Memorial Highway |
| US 24 | 255.13 | 410.59 | US 24 in Quincy | US 24/US 52 in Sheldon | 1926 | current | |
| US 30 | 153.79 | 247.50 | US 30 in Fulton | US 30 in Lynwood | 1926 | current | |
| US 32 | — | — | US 6 at Moline | US 41 in Chicago | 1926 | 1934 | Now US 6 and US 34 |
| US 34 | 211.37 | 340.17 | US 34 in Gladstone | IL 43 in Berwyn | 1926 | current | Walter Payton Memorial Highway |
| US 36 | 216.47 | 348.37 | I-72/US 36/Route 110 in Hull | US 36 in Chrisman | 1926 | current | |
| US 40 | 159.99 | 257.48 | I-55/I-64/US 40 in East St. Louis | I-70/US 40 near Marshall | 1926 | current | National Road |
| US 41 | 64.81 | 104.30 | US 12/US 20/US 41 in Chicago | I-94/US 41 near Russell | 1926 | current | Brian Piccolo Memorial Highway |
| US 45 | 428.99 | 690.39 | US 45 near Brookport | US 45 near Antioch | 1926 | current | |
| US 50 | 165.79 | 266.81 | I-255/US 50 in Columbia | US 50 in Lawrenceville | 1926 | current | |
| US 51 | 415.95 | 669.41 | US 51/US 60/US 62 at Cairo | US 51 in South Beloit | 1926 | current | |
| US 52 | 216 | 348 | US 52/Iowa 64 in Savanna | US 24/US 52 in Sheldon | 1926 | current | |
| US 54 | 23.96 | 38.56 | US 54 near Pittsfield | I-72/US 36 near Pittsfield | 1926 | current | |
| US 60 | 0.92 | 1.48 | US 60/US 62 at Cairo | US 51/US 60/US 62 at Cairo | 1926 | current | Concurrent with US 62 |
| US 61 | 2.42 | 3.89 | US 61/US 151 at East Dubuque | US 61/US 151 at East Dubuque | 1971 | 1982 | Concurrent with US 151 |
| US 62 | 0.92 | 1.48 | US 60/US 62 at Cairo | US 51/US 60/US 62 at Cairo | 1926 | current | Concurrent with US 60 |
| US 66 | 301 | 484 | US 66 at East St. Louis | US 41 in Chicago | 1926 | 1974 | Will Rogers Highway / Mother Road |
| US 67 | 213.99 | 344.38 | US 67 in Alton | US 67 in Rock Island | 1926 | current | |
| US 124 | 80 | 130 | — | — | 1926 | 1938 | |
| US 136 | 225.95 | 363.63 | US 136 at Hamilton | US 136 at Danville | 1926 | current | |
| US 150 | 267.47 | 430.45 | US 6 at Moline | US 150 near Paris | 1926 | current | |
| US 151 | 2.42 | 3.89 | US 61/US 151 at East Dubuque | US 61/US 151 at East Dubuque | 1971 | 1982 | Concurrent with US 61 |
| US 330 | — | — | — | — | 1926 | 1942 | Replaced by US 30 Alt.; part of it is now IL 38 |
| US 430 | — | — | — | — | 1926 | 1934 | Replaced by US 330; now part of IL 31 |
| US 460 | — | — | — | — | 1947 | 1974 | Replaced by I-64 |
Former

== Special routes ==
| Number | Length (mi) | Length (km) | Southern or western terminus | Northern or eastern terminus | Formed | Removed | Notes |
|---|---|---|---|---|---|---|---|
| Temp. US 6 | — | — | Moline | Joliet | — | — | |
| US 6 Bus. | — | — | Lansing | Illinois–Indiana state line | — | — | |
| City US 12 | — | — | — | — | 1938 | 1960 | Served Chicago |
| US 12 Bus. | — | — | — | — | 1960 | 1968 | Served Chicago |
| US 20 Bus. | — | — | — | — | 1988 | current | Serves Freeport |
| US 20 Bus. | — | — | Winnebago | Belvidere | 1926 | current | State Street; Serves Rockford |
| US 20 Bus. | — | — | — | — | 1962 | 1984 | Served Elgin |
| US 20 Bus. | — | — | — | — | 1938 | 1968 | Serves Chicago; Formerly designated as City US Route 20 |
| City US 30 | — | — | — | — | 1959 | 1960 | Served Aurora |
| US 30 Bus. | — | — | — | — | 1960 | 1970 | Served Aurora; Formerly designated as City US Route 30 |
| US 30 Toll | — | — | Aurora | Ford Heights | — | — | |
| US 30 Alt. | — | — | — | — | 1942 | 1971 | Served Chicago; Formerly designated as US Route 330 |
| US 40 Alt. | — | — | — | — | 1948 | 1967 | Served Greenville-Vandalia |
| US 40 Byp. | — | — | Chain of Rocks Bridge | US 40 in Troy | 1938 | 1965 | Served the Greater St. Louis Area |
| Temp. US 41 | — | — | Lincolnwood | Skokie | — | — | |
| Temp. US 41 | — | — | Highland Park | Del Mar Woods | — | — | |
| US 41 Toll | — | — | Lansing | Antioch | — | — | |
| US 45 Byp. | — | — | — | — | — | — | Served Norris City |
| US 50 Byp. | — | — | — | — | 1955 | 1975 | Serves the Greater St. Louis Area; replaced by I-255 as well as mainline US 50 |
| US 50 Bus. | — | — | — | — | 1962 | current | Serves Lawrenceville |
| US 51 Bus. | — | — | — | — | — | — | Serves Elwin-Decatur |
| US 51 Bus. | — | — | — | — | 1926 | current | Serves Clinton |
| US 51 Bus. | — | — | — | — | 1926 | current | Serves Bloomington-Normal |
| US 51 Bus. | — | — | — | — | — | — | Serves LaSalle, Illinois |
| US 54 Bus. | 6 | 9.7 | — | — | 1959 | 1969 | Serves Kankakee |
| US 66 Byp. | — | — | Chain of Rocks Bridge | US 66/IL 140 in Hamel | 1957 | — | Served the Greater St. Louis Area |
| City US 66 | — | — | — | — | — | 1957 | Served the Greater St. Louis Area |
| US 66 Bus. | — | — | — | — | — | — | Served East St. Louis |
| US 66 Bus. | — | — | — | — | — | — | Served Springfield |
| US 66 Bus. | — | — | — | — | — | — | Served Lincoln |
| US 66 Bus. | — | — | — | — | — | — | Served Bloomington |
| US 66 Alt. | 40 | 64 | — | — | — | — | Served Joliet |
| US 67 Alt. | — | — | — | — | 1953 | 1965 | |
| US 67 Alt. | — | — | — | — | 1939 | 1964 | Served the Greater St. Louis Area |
| US 150 Bus. | — | — | — | — | — | — | Served Peoria |
| City US 150 | — | — | — | — | — | — | Served Peoria |
| US 150 Bus. | — | — | — | — | — | — | Served Champaign |
| Temp. US 150 | — | — | Ogden | Paris | — | — | |
| US 460 Alt. | — | — | — | — | — | — | Served Mount Vernon |
Former
