= Griggsville Township, Pike County, Illinois =

Coordinates: 39°42′29″N 90°44′30″W

Griggsville Township
- Township
- Location in Pike County

- Pike County's location in Illinois
- Country: United States
- State: Illinois
- County: Pike
- Established: November 8, 1853

Area
  - Total: 37.64 sq mi (97.5 km^{2})
  - Land: 37.64 sq mi (97.5 km^{2})
  - Water: 0 sq mi (0 km^{2}) 0%

Population (2010)
  - Estimate (2016): 1,369
  - Density: 38/sq mi (15/km^{2})
- Time zone: UTC-6 (CST)
  - Summer (DST): UTC-5 (CDT)
- FIPS code: 17-149-31784

Griggsville Township is located in Pike County, Illinois. As of the 2010 census, its population was 1,430 and it contained 671 housing units.

== History ==
Griggsville Township was named for Richard Griggs.

== Geography ==
According to the 2010 census, the township has a total area of 37.64 square miles (97.5 km^{2}), all land.

== Demographics ==
Historical population
Census	Pop.	Note	%±
2016 (est.)	1,369
U.S. Decennial Census
