= Kinderhook Township, Pike County, Illinois =

Coordinates: 39°42′45″N 91°12′29″W

Kinderhook Township
- Township
- Location in Pike County

- Pike County's location in Illinois
- Country: United States
- State: Illinois
- County: Pike
- Established: November 8, 1853

Area
  - Total: 37.91 sq mi (98.2 km^{2})
  - Land: 37.86 sq mi (98.1 km^{2})
  - Water: 0.05 sq mi (0.13 km^{2}) 0.13%

Population (2010)
  - Estimate (2016): 806
  - Density: 22.2/sq mi (8.6/km^{2})
- Time zone: UTC-6 (CST)
  - Summer (DST): UTC-5 (CDT)
- FIPS code: 17-149-39935

Kinderhook Township is located in Pike County, Illinois. As of the 2010 census, its population was 840 and it contained 422 housing units.

== Geography ==
According to the 2010 census, the township has a total area of 37.91 square miles (98.2 km^{2}), of which 37.86 square miles (98.1 km^{2}) (or 99.87%) is land and 0.05 square miles (0.13 km^{2}) (or 0.13%) is water.

== Demographics ==
Historical population
Census	Pop.	Note	%±
2016 (est.)	806
U.S. Decennial Census
