= National Register of Historic Places listings in Pike County, Illinois =

Location of Pike County in Illinois

This is a list of the National Register of Historic Places listings in Pike County, Illinois.

This is intended to be a complete list of the properties and districts on the National Register of Historic Places in Pike County, Illinois, United States. Latitude and longitude coordinates are provided for many National Register properties and districts; these locations may be seen together in a map.

There are 14 properties and districts listed on the National Register in the county, including 1 National Historic Landmark.

This National Park Service list is complete through NPS recent listings posted March 21, 2025.

== Current listings ==
	Name on the Register	Image	Date listed	Location	City or town	Description
1	Barry Historic District	Barry Historic District	March 13, 1979 (#79000862)	U.S. Route 36; 39°41′36″N 91°02′26″W	Barry	
2	Church of Christ	Church of Christ	August 8, 2006 (#06000675)	102 Main St. 39°47′05″N 90°44′41″W	Perry	
3	Griggsville Historic District	Griggsville Historic District	January 17, 1979 (#79000863)	Irregular pattern along Corey, Stanford, Quincy, and Liberty Sts. 39°42′24″N 90°43′28″W	Griggsville	
4	Griggsville Landing Lime Kiln		August 30, 1999 (#99000974)	Township Road 490, north of Napoleon Hollow; 39°41′24″N 90°38′46″W	Valley City	
5	Lock and Dam No. 22 Historic District	Lock and Dam No. 22 Historic District	March 10, 2004 (#04000182)	Road 920E; 39°38′18″N 91°14′44″W	Hull	Extends into Ralls County, Missouri
6	Massie Variety Store		August 20, 2004 (#04000864)	110 S. Main St. 39°38′18″N 91°05′45″W	New Canton	
7	Free Frank McWorter Grave Site		April 19, 1988 (#87002533)	Off U.S. Route 36, 4 miles (6.4 km) east of Barry; 39°41′37″N 90°57′02″W	Barry	
8	Naples Mound 8	Naples Mound 8	October 14, 1975 (#75000671)	North of Interstate 72 just west of the Illinois River; 39°41′15″N 90°39′08″W	Griggsville	
9	New Philadelphia Town Site	New Philadelphia Town Site	August 11, 2005 (#05000869)	Township Road 156, east of Barry; 39°41′45″N 90°57′35″W	Barry	Designated an NHL on January 16, 2009
10	Pittsfield East School	Pittsfield East School	February 12, 1971 (#71000295)	400 E. Jefferson St. 39°41′50″N 90°48′04″W	Pittsfield	
11	Pittsfield Historic District	Pittsfield Historic District	June 4, 1980 (#80001404)	Roughly bounded by Washington Court and Sycamore, Morrison, and Griggsville Sts. 39°36′27″N 90°48′19″W	Pittsfield	
12	Lyman Scott House	Lyman Scott House	February 10, 1983 (#83000334)	U.S. Route 54; 39°32′35″N 90°55′15″W	Summer Hill	
13	John Shastid House	John Shastid House	June 26, 2003 (#03000579)	326 E. Jefferson; 39°36′33″N 90°48′06″W	Pittsfield	
14	Zoe Theatre	Zoe Theatre	January 2, 2013 (#12001116)	209 N. Madison St. 39°36′30″N 90°48′23″W	Pittsfield	

== See also ==
- List of National Historic Landmarks in Illinois
- National Register of Historic Places listings in Illinois
