= Zoe Theatre =

- U.S. National Register of Historic Places
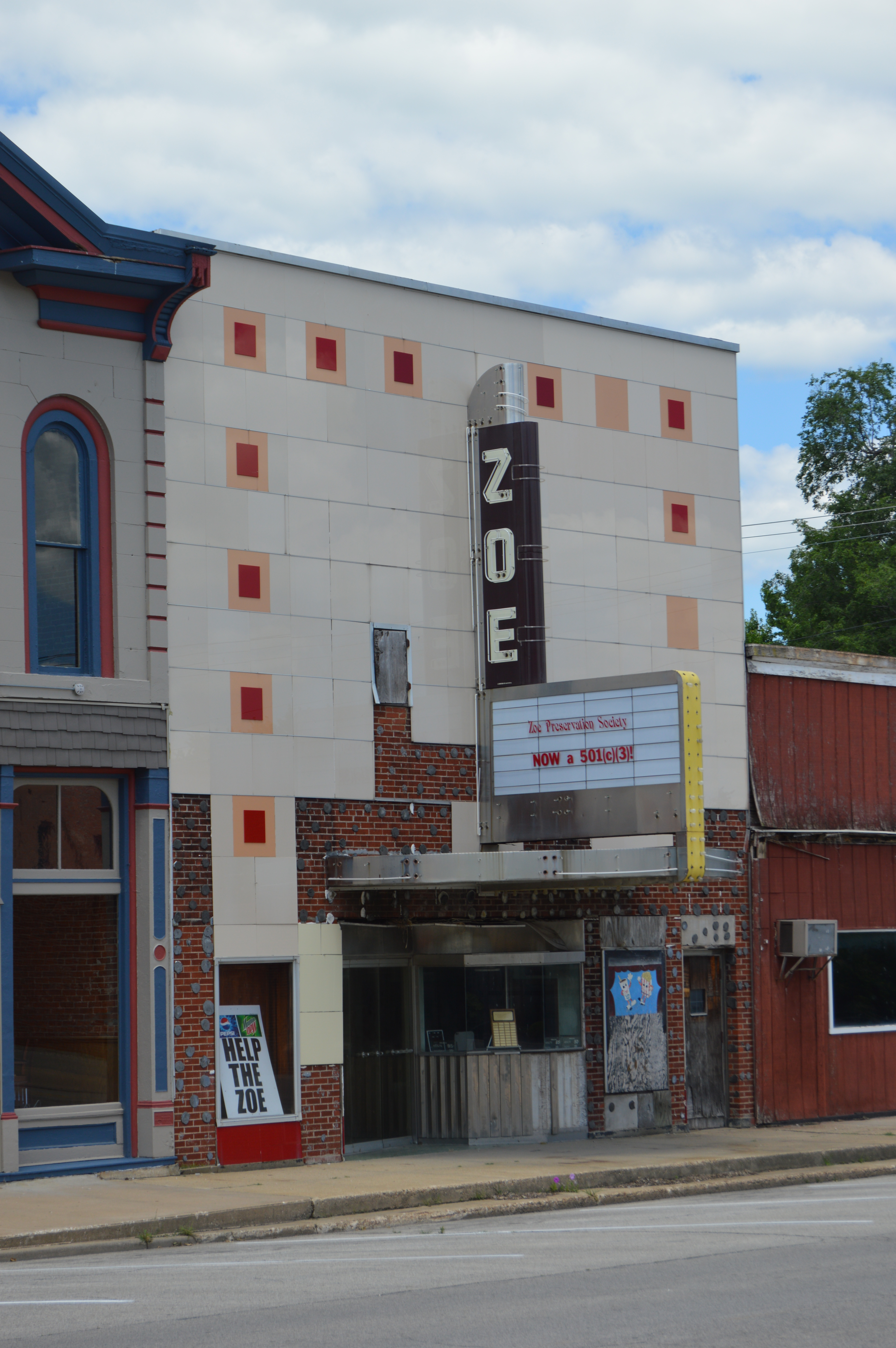

- Location within Illinois Location within the United States
- Location: 209 N. Madison St., Pittsfield, Illinois
- Coordinates: 39°36′30″N 90°48′23″W
- Built: 1950
- Architectural style: Streamline Moderne
- NRHP reference No.: 12001116
- Added to NRHP: January 2, 2013

The Zoe Theatre is a historic movie theater located at 209 North Madison Street in Pittsfield, Illinois.

== History ==
The Zoe Theatre was built by Clark Armentrout, originally from Louisiana, Missouri. Before he built the Zoe, there was the Clark Theatre. Armentrout and his son Russel owned both the Clark and Zoe Theatres in the city of Pittsfield.

Clark first opened the Zoe Theatre on September 17, 1950. As well as the Zoe, Clark also owned the Clark Drive-In at Summer Hill and the Clark Theatres in Barry, Louisiana, Missouri and Shelbina, Missouri.

The Zoe Theatre was named after Clark's daughter, Zoe Armentrout, who died on September 26, 1992. She lived in Pittsfield and was buried at the Pittsfield West Cemetery.

After Clark died in 1960, both the Clark and Zoe Theatres closed.

== Construction ==
The Streamline Moderne style theater was designed by Ted Dell. The building received an Annual Merit Award in Theatre Catalog's annual design review in 1951; it was one of thirty-six theaters nationwide and two in Illinois to earn the award.

The building has a striking structural glass (commonly known as Vitrolite) and stainless steel front. Predominant colors when the Zoe first opened was rose and green with a smooth flowing marine theme carried out in the design. The air conditioning and heating system was the most modern and most automatic type available in 1950. The seats were more widely spaced than usual. A special feature of the theatre was a "cry baby" room for babies.

The entry doors are solid panes of glass. Locks and closing mechanisms are concealed in small metal strips along the top and bottom.

General Contractors were Eugene Dark and Sons, sheet metal work was done by Galloway Hardware of Pleasant Hill, Rex Fenton installed the heating and air conditioning units which are located in a small basement beneath the stage, and Mike Carroll was the painting contractor.

Excavating was done by Pittsfield Sand and Gravel Company. Gravel was furnished by Ed Beard and concrete work was done by Frank Cawthon's crew. Building materials were furnished by Alexander Lumber Company. Glass was furnished by Pittsburgh Plate Glass Company. The marquee and box office was made and installed by C Bendsen Company of Decatur.

== Zoe Preservation Society ==
The theatre closed in 1987 and has been vacant. The city of Pittsfield assumed ownership in 2004 and repaired the roof in 2005.

Since 2008, Kaye Iftner, who is the treasurer of the Zoe Preservation Society, or ZPS, has had her group working towards completely renovating the Zoe and even attempting to bring it back to life in the near future. The project, estimated to cost between $350,000 and $500,000, has not come to fruition. But with the support of the community through the use of fundraisers, volunteering, and helping spread awareness of ZPS, in the near future, Pike County could very well have its own fully functional movie theatre. To date, the closest movie theatre is 45 miles away in Jacksonville, Illinois.

The ZPS has also received help from the Pittsfield High School’s Social Problems class, who is making a collection of flyers, presentations, surveys, and even updating this Wikipedia page. Kaye Iftner has provided the class with documents and information to help update this page and teach the class about their purpose.

The theater was added to the National Register of Historic Places on January 2, 2013.
