= Christopher C. Fennell =

American anthropologist and lawyer

Christopher C. Fennell (born c. 1964) is an American anthropologist and lawyer, an assistant professor of Anthropology at the University of Illinois, Urbana-Champaign. His first book Crossroads and Cosmologies: Diasporas and Ethnogenesis in the New World (2008) received the John L. Cotter Award from the Society for Historical Archaeology. Fennell is editor of the African Diaspora Archaeology Network and Newsletter, and an associate of the editorial board of the International Journal of Historical Archaeology.

== Education ==
Fennell earned his M.A. in American Civilization from the University of Pennsylvania in 1986. He received his J.D. in 1989 from Georgetown University Law Center.

Returning to graduate study and a second career, in 2000 he received an M.A. in anthropology from the University of Virginia. In 2003, Fennell completed his Ph.D. in anthropology from the University of Virginia, where he specialized in historical archaeology and African diaspora archaeology.

== Academic career ==
In his first years, Fennell taught at a variety of institutions: first was the University of Virginia, Charlottesville, including a course on witchcraft and magic which he designed, and historical archaeology theory and methods. In the spring of 2001, Fennell was an instructor at Roosevelt University in Chicago, Illinois, teaching cross-cultural anthropology. During the fall of 2003, Fennell was a lecturer at Texas State University in San Marcos, Texas, teaching an introduction to cultural anthropology. From 2003 to 2004, Fennell was adjunct professor of law and senior research fellow at the University of Texas School of Law in Austin, Texas, where he taught “Anthropology and Law” and “Social Norms and the Law.” From 2004 until now, Fennell is assistant professor of anthropology at the University of Illinois, Urbana-Champaign in Urbana, Illinois. He is also a staff member in the College of Law, teaching interdisciplinary lectures in anthropology and law, the Department of Landscape Architecture, the African American Studies Program, and the Center for African Studies.

== Editor ==
Fennell has done extensive editorial work. From 1998 to the present, he has been editor and co-founder (with historians James Deetz and Patricia Scott Deetz) of the online-based "Plymouth Colony Archive Project", which is “ethnohistorical and archaeological analyses and historical texts”. This project was recognized by the National Endowment for the Humanities and "peer-reviewed for outstanding intellectual quality, superior design, and educational impact." Since 2004, Fennell has been an article and book referee for various publications, including, American Anthropologist, Historical Archaeology, and Mid-Continental Journal of Archaeology.

Since 2005, Fennell has been editor of the African Diaspora Archaeology Network (ADAN) and Newsletter and an editorial board member of International Journal of Historical Archaeology.

== Excavations and research ==
In 2008 Fennell led summer research and excavations at the New Philadelphia Town Site in Illinois. It is listed on the National Register of Historic Places in 2005 and designated a National Historic Landmark in 2009. The town site is at New Philadelphia, Illinois.

This plot of land in Pike County, Illinois, was the site of the first town platted and registered by an African American before the American Civil War. It had black and white residents, and an integrated school. As a railroad was built bordering a neighboring community, the New Philadelphia expansion seemed to come to a halt. By the early 20th century, only a few homes and families remained. Today only prairie remains with no evidence of a once-flourishing community.

During the fall and spring of 2002 and 2003, Fennell and a team from University of Illinois, University of Maryland and other institutions used topographical and historical maps to find the exact location of the New Philadelphia Site. They found plots of land with artifacts such as nails, ceramic pieces, and shards of glass, showing obvious signs of a previous settlement. The archaeologists are working with the New Philadelphia Land Trust to excavate and preserve the site and its history.

In 1999 and 2000, Fennell performed excavations and studies in the upper Potomac River and northern Shenandoah River region surrounding Harpers Ferry, West Virginia. Included were an 18th-century house and St. Peter's Church and School in Harper's Valley. He examined three cultural processes: the formation and dissipation of social groups, the development of language and communication through material culture, and regional exchange systems.

== Books ==
- Crossroads and Cosmologies: Diasporas and Ethnogenesis in the New World (2008) (received award, see below)
- African Diaspora Archaeology (2008) Society for Historical Archaeology.

== Awards ==
- 2009 John L. Cotter Award, the Society for Historical Archaeology

== Other publications ==
- "BaKongo Identity and Symbolic Expression in the Americas", The Archaeology of Atlantic Africa and the African Diaspora, ed. Toyin Falola and Akin Ogundiran, Bloomington, IN: Indiana University Press, 2007
- "Conjuring Boundaries: Inferring Past Identities from Religious Artifacts", International Journal of Historical Archaeology, 4(4): 281-313 (2000).
- "Molded Malevolence: Instrumental Symbolism Rendered in Clay", Ceramics in America, Vol. 3, pp. 270–273, University Press of New England and the Chipstone Foundation (2003).
- "New Philadelphia: The XYZs of the First Excavations", with Terrance J. Martin and Paul A. Shackel, Living Museum, 66(4): 8-13 (2004/2005).
- Editor, African Diaspora Archaeology Network, University of Illinois, 2008
- “Historical Archaeology in Harpers Ferry”, University of Illinois, Urbana-Champaign, 14 December 2007
