= Lyman Scott House =

Historic house in Illinois, United States

- U.S. National Register of Historic Places
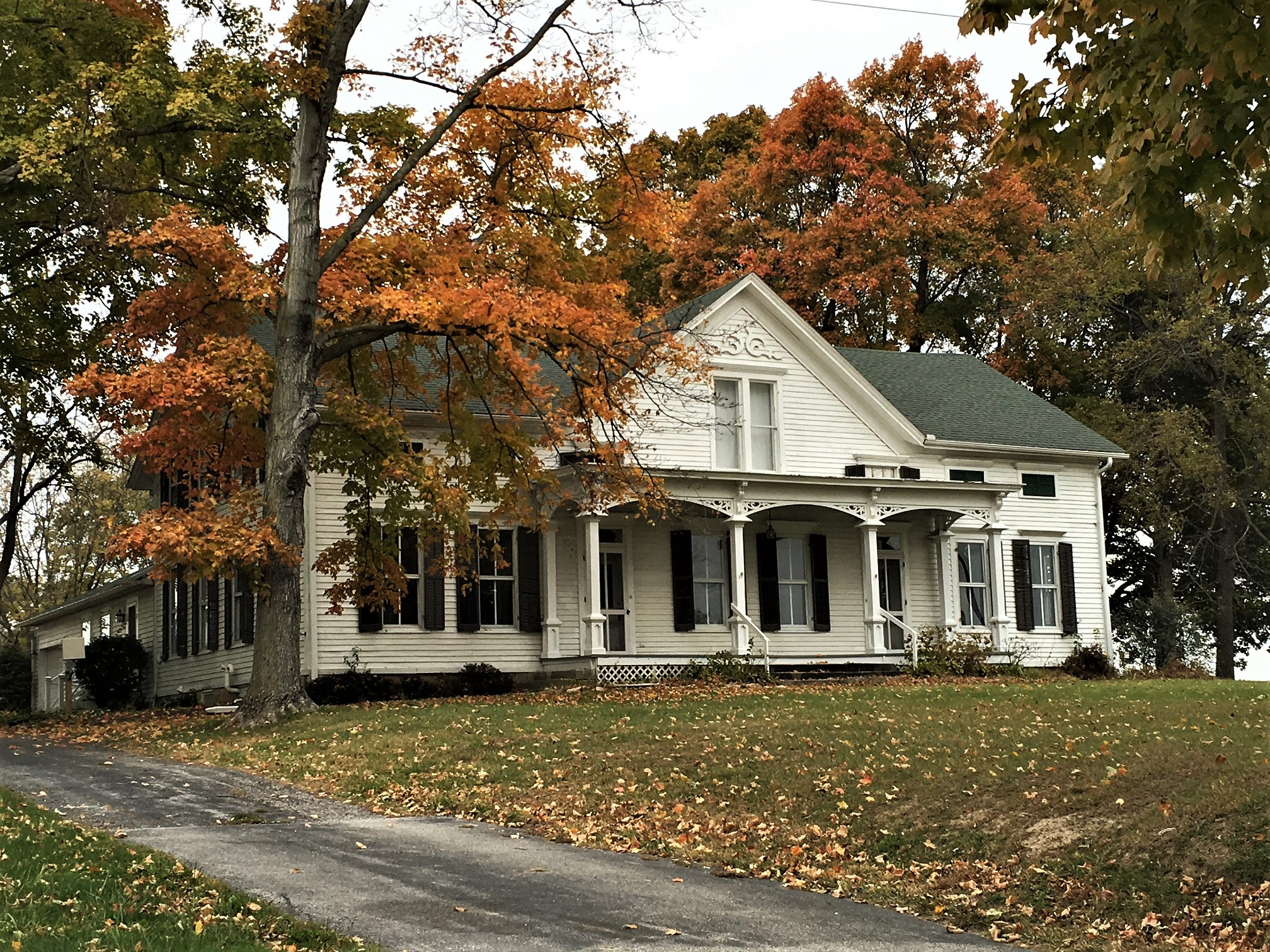

- Location within Illinois Location within the United States
- Location: U.S. 54; Summer Hill, Illinois
- Coordinates: 39°32′47″N 90°55′9″W
- Area: less than one acre
- Built: 1844
- NRHP reference No.: 83000334
- Added to NRHP: February 10, 1983

The Lyman Scott House is a historic house located on U.S. Route 54 in Summer Hill, Pike County, Illinois. The house was built in 1844 by Lyman Scott, who founded Summer Hill the following year. Scott, an early Pike County settler who also founded Rockport, built the house as a summer home for his family. The two-story post and beam house features a front porch over its two front entrances; a gabled dormer was added to the porch in 1870. Scott, a prominent local merchant, also founded and funded Summer Hill's first school. Scott also served as a representative to the International Peace Conference in 1850. In 1853, Scott moved to Kansas, where he served in the state legislature. The house is the oldest surviving building in Summer Hill.

The house was listed on the National Register of Historic Places on February 10, 1983.

== See also ==
- National Register of Historic Places in Pike County, Illinois
