= Pittsfield East School =

- U.S. National Register of Historic Places
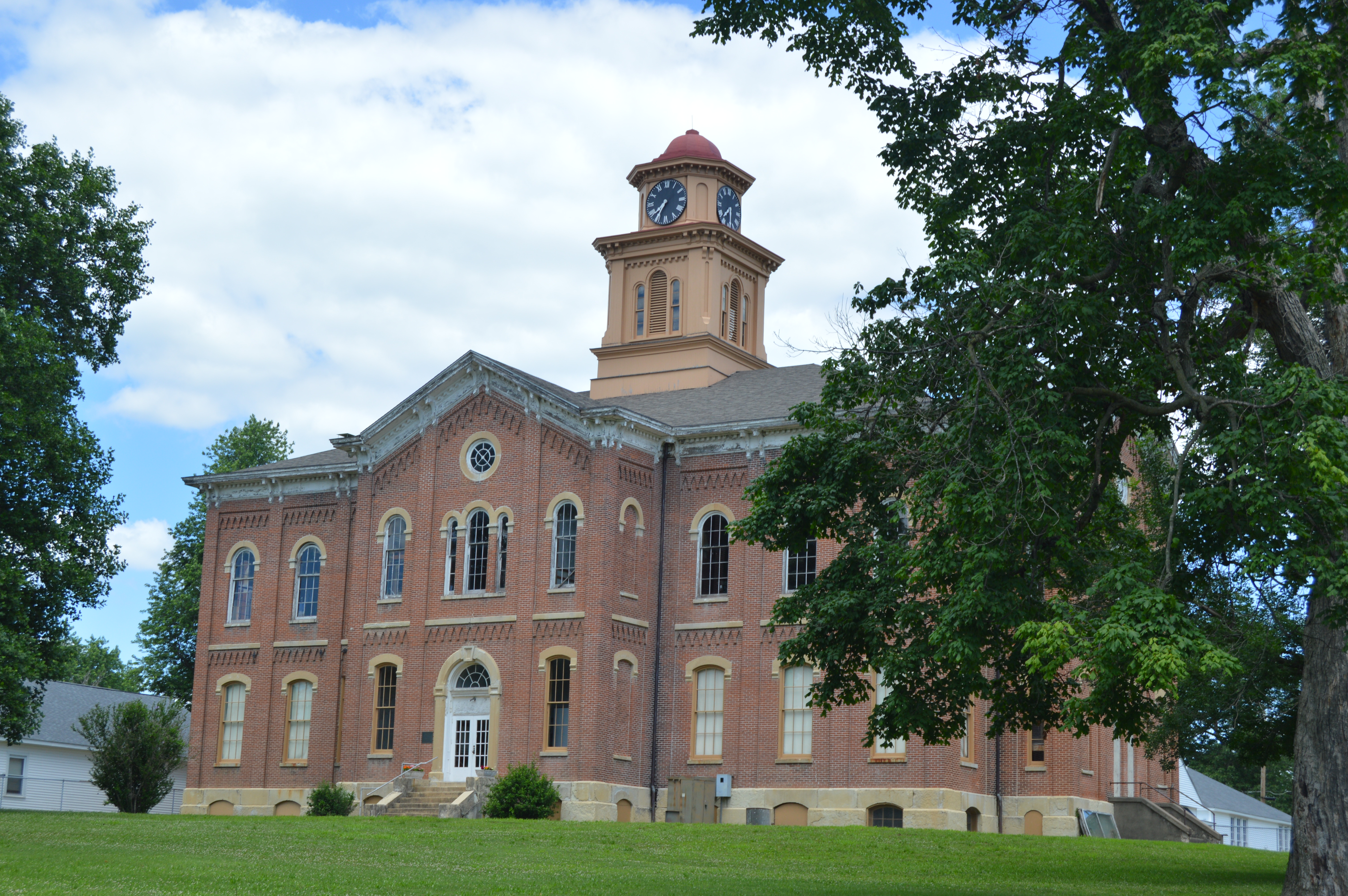
- Front and eastern site

- Location within Illinois Location within the United States
- Location: 400 E. Jefferson St., Pittsfield, Illinois
- Coordinates: 39°36′35″N 90°48′30″W
- Area: 9.9 acres (4.0 ha)
- Built: 1861 - 1866
- Architect: John M. Van Osdel
- NRHP reference No.: 71000295
- Added to NRHP: February 12, 1971

Pittsfield East School is located in Pittsfield, Illinois, Pike County, United States. The building was placed on the National Register of Historic Places in 1971.

== History ==
The East Ward School, built between 1861 and 1866, was designed by architect John M. Van Osdel, who also designed the Palmer House in Chicago, as well as the Governor's Mansion in Springfield. John Houston of Griggsville built the school for the contract price of $35,000, which was financed by bonding. The building is stone (boated from Joliet on the Illinois River) and brick burned in Pittsfield. Both the grade school and high school were located in this building. Its large clock and bell were donated by Colonel Ross and mounted in the tower. The school closed in 1955 and was unoccupied until 1978 when it was renovated and became the home of the Pike County Historical Society and the Pike County Historic Museum.

== Pike County Historical Society Museum ==
Today the building houses the Pike County Historical Society Museum, with artifacts and exhibits of local history.

The Society also owns and provides tours of the John Shastid House.

== See also ==
Other locations listed on the National Register of Historic Places in Pittsfield include, Pittsfield Historic District and the John Shastid House.
