= Cliff Padgett =

American motorboat builder

Clifford E. Padgett (December 19, 1879 – August 7, 1951) was an American motorboat builder who built racing boats. He broke the world water speed record in hydroplane boat racing in 1924.

== Life ==
Padgett was born in 1879 in Barry, Illinois. In 1894 he moved to Quincy, Illinois, where he began an apprenticeship at a blacksmith shop owned by John Reagan. In 1903, Padgett began to take an interest in the river as well as in building a racing boat with a Pierce-Budd 3-cylinder engine. In 1906, he married Reagan's daughter Lillian and opened his own blacksmith shop.

With only a fifth-grade education, Padgett took a correspondence course in mechanical drawing and design. He developed a skill for "blueprinting" and carving miniature boat models out of mahogany. He entered and won his first regatta in 1914, and in 1916 his 16-foot hydroplane convinced him to give up blacksmithing for boat building.

For the next 25 years, Padgett built and raced boats. Many of the races he participated in were on the Mississippi River along the Quincy waterfront.

By 1928, Padgett was too busy building boats to race and his racing designs and boat construction skills were becoming well known, even outside the Midwest. He died in 1951 after a career that included building more than 200 pleasure and racing boats.

== Racing ==
Padgett designed, built, and drove racing motorboats in Quincy. He also chaired the planning committee of the Quincy Boat Club, the organization responsible for sponsoring many of Quincy's races and related celebrations. He won trophies and in 1924 at Palm Beach, Florida, in competition with twenty-one other boats in the 151-class hydroplane races, he clocked a world record 41.96 miles per hour (67.53 km/h).
