= Pike County Courthouse (Illinois) =

Local government building in the United States

- U.S. Historic district – Contributing property
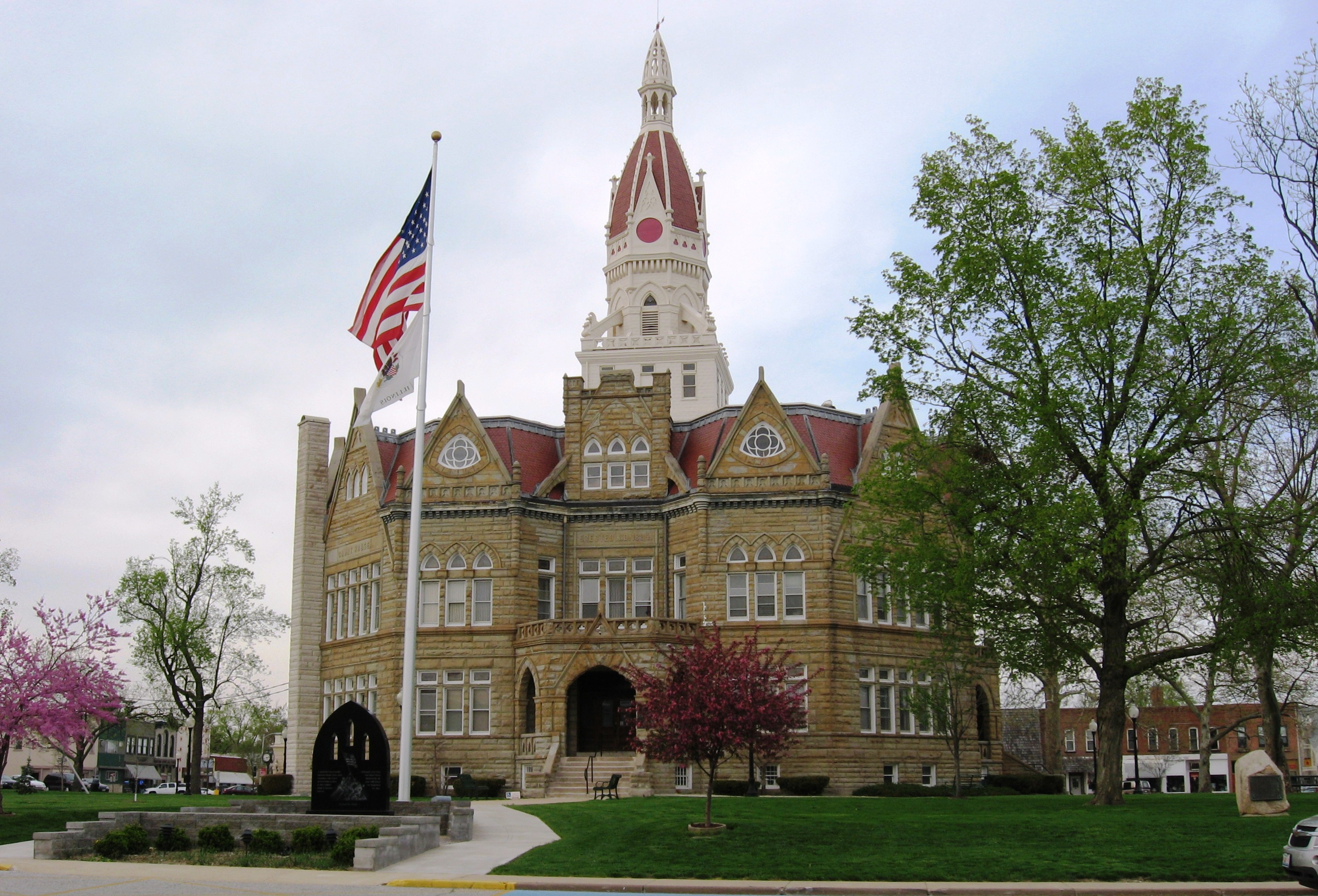
- Southern facade

- Location within Illinois Location within the United States
- Interactive map showing the location of Pike County Courthouse
- Location: 100 E. Washington Street, Pittsfield, Illinois
- Coordinates: 39°36′27″N 90°48′19″W
- Built: 1895
- Architectural style: Gothic Revival
- Part of: Pittsfield Historic District (ID80001404)
- Added to NRHP: June 4, 1980

The Pike County Courthouse is a government building in Pittsfield, the county seat of Pike County, Illinois, United States. Completed in 1895, it is the fifth courthouse in the county's history.

== Foundation ==
Pike County's first settler was Ebenezer Franklin, who built a cabin in early 1820 near the future location of Atlas. Other settlers followed him to the vicinity; as late as 1829, Atlas was the only properly platted town in Pike County. Rapid growth in the Military Tract prompted the legislature to create Pike County in 1821, with the first seat being the settlement of Coles Grove in what has since become Calhoun County.

== Previous courthouses ==
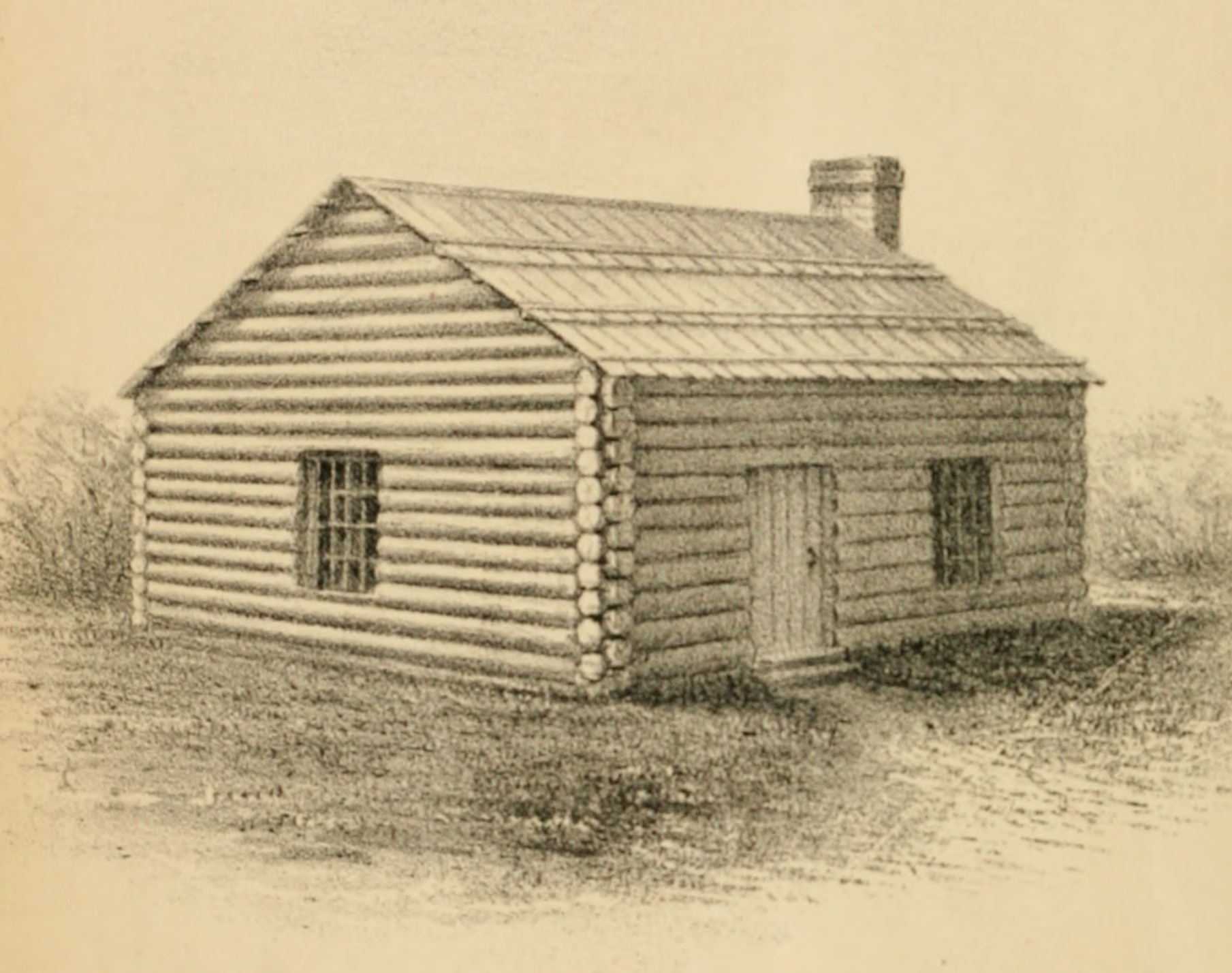
Original courthouse

The first Pike County Courthouse was completed in mid-1821; it was a log building, 16 by 18 feet (4.9 m × 5.5 m), and the county paid $32 to Daniel Shinn for the project. Despite this expense, officials soon sought to leave; a commission chose Atlas to be the permanent county seat in early 1823, although the official move was delayed until 1824 by a lawsuit. A new courthouse was built at Atlas by year's end, although the courts had been meeting there since the previous year. This being a temporary log building, county officials soon outgrew it, and a better structure was ordered in 1826 at a cost of nearly $1,500. However, the commissioners' plans were too grand; this building was never constructed, and county offices began operating out of rented quarters. The commissioners' second attempt at a courthouse was more successful; it was ordered in early 1829, and by September the county had paid approximately $1,800 for its new building, 36 by 24 feet (11.0 m × 7.3 m) and two stories tall.

Despite the expense of this building, county residents living far from Atlas sought to have the seat relocated, and in 1833 it was moved to a new location to be named "Pittsfield". The first courthouse there was a wooden building ordered in 1833 and erected near the public square, but as early as 1836 county officials ordered yet another new building. When it was completed in 1839, the county had spent $15,000 building one of the region's grandest courthouses, and the old courthouse was relegated to commercial purposes.

== Current courthouse ==
Pike County's current courthouse was constructed in 1894 and 1895. Its architect, Henry Elliott, was also responsible for designing the Edgar County Courthouse, which features a very similar design. The building's exterior features twenty-four sides; its plan is basically that of an octagon 110 by 119 feet (34 m × 36 m) with recesses in the middle of each of the four long sides. Built of rusticated stone, the courthouse is two and a half stories tall with belt courses separating the stories. Rectangular windows are placed in each of the sides, grouped in clusters of three or five except on the shortest walls, while small ogive windows placed above many of the rectangular windows give the appearance of the Gothic Revival style. Atop the center sits a 136 feet (41 m) tower. The interior is built around a large lightwell.

Comparatively little change has occurred in the courthouse square since the First World War, and the courthouse continues to dominate the downtown. It is one of the key buildings included within the Pittsfield Historic District, which was added to the National Register of Historic Places in 1980.
