= New Philadelphia National Historic Site =

Archaeological site in Illinois, United States

- New Philadelphia
- U.S. National Register of Historic Places
- U.S. National Historic Landmark
- U.S. National Historic Site
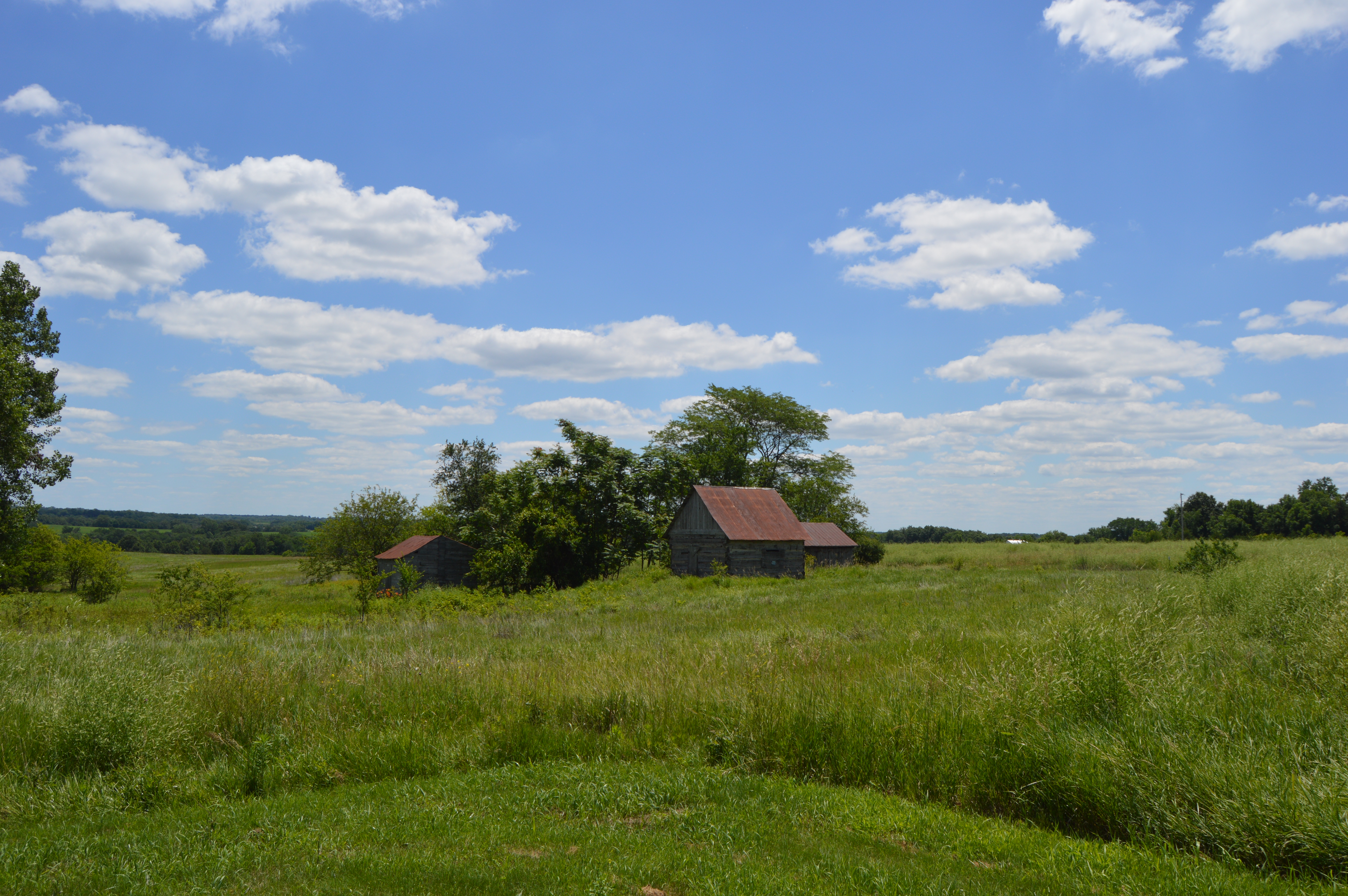
- Overview from the interpretive site

- Location within Illinois Location within the United States
- Location: Pike County, Illinois
- Nearest city: Barry
- Coordinates: 39°41′45″N 90°57′35″W
- Area: 42 acres (17 ha)
- Built: 1869
- Website: www.nps.gov/neph/index.htm
- NRHP reference No.: 05000869

Significant dates
- Added to NRHP: August 11, 2005
- Designated NHL: January 16, 2009

The New Philadelphia National Historic Site is the original site of the now-vanished town of New Philadelphia, Illinois, in the United States. It is located near the western Illinois city of Barry, in Pike County.

Founded in 1836, New Philadelphia was the first town in the United States platted and registered by an African American before the American Civil War. The founder, Free Frank McWorter (1777–1854), was a former slave who was able to save money from work and his own business to purchase the freedom of his wife, then himself, and over time, 13 members of his family from Kentucky. Several of his freedom purchases were funded by the sale of New Philadelphia lots. The town was integrated and reached a population of about 160 near the close of the Civil War in 1865. A few years later, the town was bypassed by the railroad line leading to its eventual decline; the town lots were generally turned into farmland in the late 19th century, although some survived into the 1920s.

The town site was listed on the National Register of Historic Places in 2005, and designated a National Historic Landmark in 2009. In 2013, the site was added to the National Underground Railroad Network to Freedom. It was designated a National Historic Site in 2022.

Another settlement named New Philadelphia in Illinois was laid out in 1866 in Mound Township, McDonough County, Illinois, near the city of Macomb, Illinois. It is unlikely the two are related.

== History ==
Free Frank McWorter purchased a 160-acre tract in Pike County, Illinois in 1830 and settled with his family in 1831. McWorter founded a town, which he thought might benefit from increasing commerce in Illinois due to the planned Illinois and Michigan Canal. He purchased the 80-acre tract from the federal government in 1835. The original town plan consisted of 144 lots in a 12 x 12 square, including 22 crisscrossing named streets. McWorter officially registered his town with government authorities and sold the lots to both blacks and whites. The town was integrated, with blacks and whites involved together in community organizations, except only a typical 19th-century segregated cemetery. There was one integrated public school.

McWorter lived there for the rest of his life, apart from brief visits to Kentucky to purchase freedom for much of the remainder of his family. These freedom purchases were largely financed by his sale of lots in New Philadelphia. He died in 1854.

Before the Civil War, New Philadelphia had become one of the stations along the Underground Railroad for shepherding escaped slaves to Canada. Escapees from Missouri were known to swim the Mississippi River to reach the town. With emancipation, more settlers arrived in New Philadelphia. Its population peaked at close to 160 shortly after 1865.

In 1869, the Hannibal and Naples Railroad was built. It bypassed the town on the north; a station was built in nearby Barry, soon to be followed by transit and commerce. New Philadelphia rapidly declined in population thereafter. A small number of residents turned to farming a portion of the former townsite. Such changes and abandonment were not unusual for U.S. small towns in the late 19th century, especially those bypassed by changing transportation facilities.

A portion of the town was legally dissolved in 1885, reverting to farmland. Modern archaeological studies indicate the area was inhabited through the 1920s. However, by the late 20th century, all vestiges of New Philadelphia had vanished save fragments of glass and pottery, along with traces of the town's gravel streets.

== Excavation and preservation ==
A three-year excavation of the area began in 2003 with a US$226,500 grant from the National Science Foundation. It was coordinated by Dr. Paul A. Shackel, the lead at University of Maryland, College Park, with participation by scholars from the University of Illinois, Urbana-Champaign. By 2006, the archaeology team had surveyed 14 of the 144 lots. In 2008, Christopher C. Fennell of the University of Illinois at Urbana-Champaign led the summer excavation team under a new grant.

The town site was added to the U.S. National Register of Historic Places in 2005. Four years later, in 2009, the Department of the Interior designated the New Philadelphia Town Site a National Historic Landmark based on the significance of its history and archaeology. Furthermore, it was added to the National Underground Railroad Network to Freedom in 2013.

New Philadelphia was the subject of an episode of the television show Time Team America – the episode was filmed in June 2008.

A preliminary study conducted by the National Park Service in 2012 found that New Philadelphia had significant archaeological and historical value, but because the sites' remains are buried underground, challenges in providing for public enjoyment and other issues would make it unsuitable as a unit of the National Park System. Despite the NPS's recommendation against a full special resource study, the Carl Levin and Howard P. "Buck" McKeon National Defense Authorization Act for Fiscal Year 2015 incorporated a bill from Representative Darin LaHood directing the Department of Interior to study the New Philadelphia townsite for possible NPS designation.

Although the special resource study had not yet been completed, legislation was included in the Consolidated Appropriations Act, 2023 to establish New Philadelphia National Historic Site, consisting of 124.33 acres. The National Historic Site will ensure protection and exploration of the site and education about interracial cooperation in Illinois.

== See also ==
- List of National Historic Landmarks in Illinois
- National Register of Historic Places listings in Pike County, Illinois
