= Church of Christ (Perry, Illinois) =

Historic church in Illinois, United States

- U.S. National Register of Historic Places
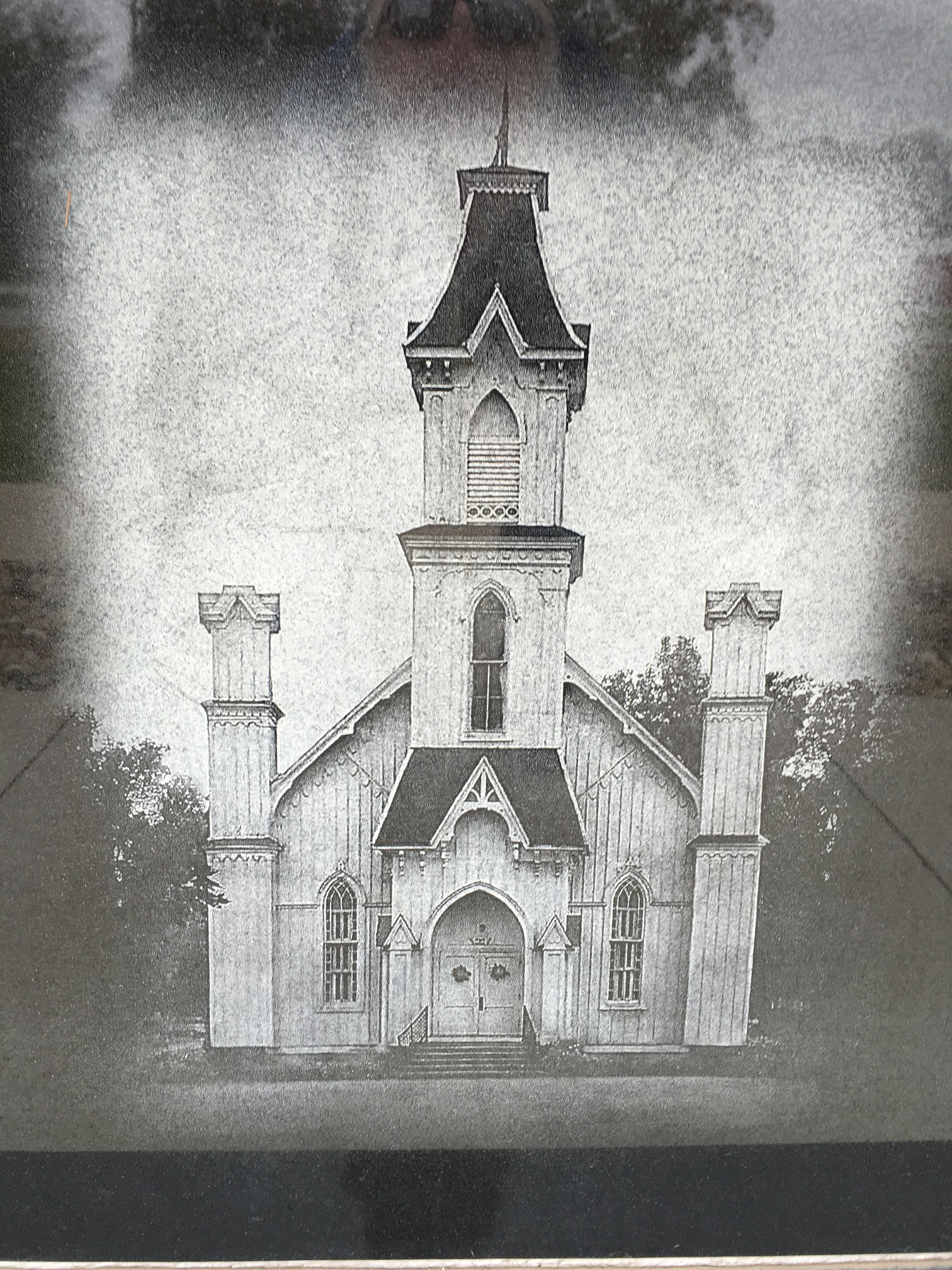
- Image of the church on the monument

- Location within Illinois Location within the United States
- Location: 102 Main St. Perry, Illinois
- Coordinates: 39°46′57″N 90°44′42″W
- Area: less than one acre
- Built: 1880
- Built by: E. Shonen
- Architectural style: Gothic
- Demolished: 2014
- NRHP reference No.: 06000675
- Added to NRHP: August 8, 2006

The Church of Christ was a historic church located at 102 Main Street in Perry, Pike County, Illinois.

== Architecture ==
The Carpenter Gothic church was built in 1880 for Perry's Church of Christ congregation, which formed in 1837. The one-story wooden building with board-and-batten siding had a limestone foundation. The front facade featured a three-section steeple and chimneys at the two corners; the steeple consisted of a tower with arched windows, a lantern with louvered windows, and a spire atop a mansard roof. The Gothic arched front entrance to the church was located at the base of the tower. Arched stained glass windows with floral and geometric patterns were located on either side of the entrance.

The church was added to the National Register of Historic Places on August 8, 2006.

== Destruction ==
On October 1, 2014, the church was struck by lightning. Firefighters from eight local areas (Perry, North Pike, Griggsville, Baylis, Pittsfield, Mount Sterling, Versailles, and Meredosia) were unable to save it. The remnants of the church were demolished.

The site is now a memorial park with a historical marker.

== Notes ==
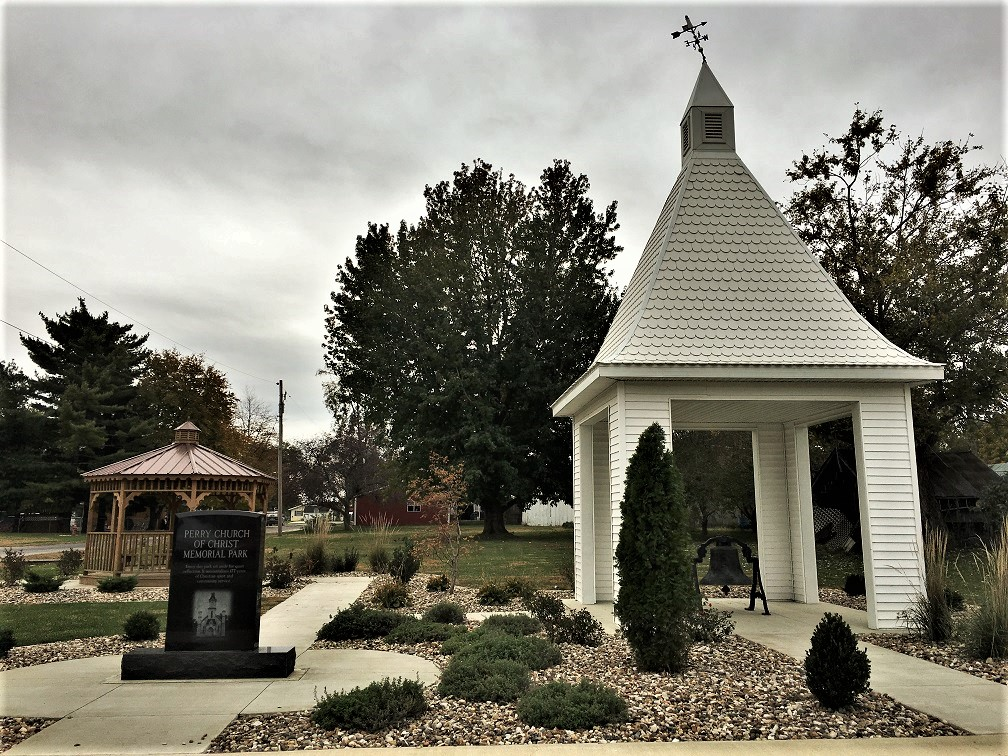
Church site in 2018
