= John Shastid House =

Historic house in Illinois, United States

- U.S. National Register of Historic Places
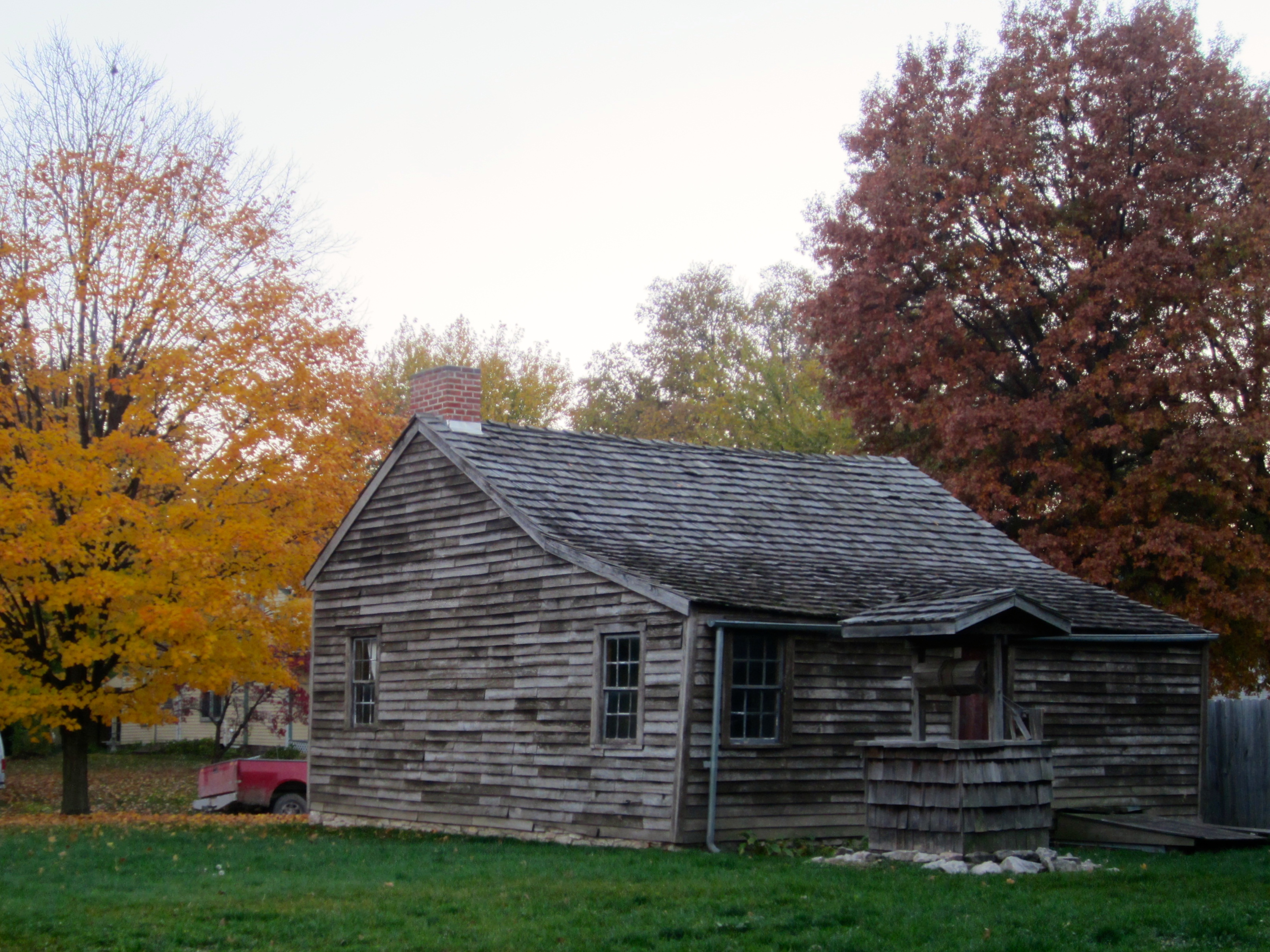

- Location within Illinois Location within the United States
- Location: 326 East Jefferson, Pittsfield, Illinois
- Coordinates: 39°36′35″N 90°48′30″W
- Area: less than one acre
- Built: 1838
- Built by: Shastid, John Greene
- Architectural style: Timber Frame
- NRHP reference No.: 03000579
- Added to NRHP: June 26, 2003

The John Shastid House is a historic house located at 326 E. Jefferson St. in Pittsfield, Illinois. John Shastid, a settler from New Salem, built the house in 1838. The timber-frame house is a well-preserved early example of the construction technique in Illinois. The house was added to the National Register of Historic Places in 2003.

== History ==
John Greene Shastid, the builder of the house, was born in Kentucky in 1798. By 1828, he and his family had settled in Illinois at the Sangamon County town of New Salem. Seeking economic opportunities in sparsely-settled Pike County, Shastid and his family moved to Pittsfield in 1836; at the time, the city had only six other houses. Shastid built his house two years later, where he lived with his wife Elizabeth and his four children. Shastid worked as a farmer and eventually held public office, serving as Pike County Sheriff for eight years. Elizabeth died in 1863, and John Shastid died in 1874; while their children had moved elsewhere by this point, the family owned and rented the house until 1927.

According to John Shastid's grandson Thomas, Abraham Lincoln visited the house while conducting legal work in Pittsfield. Family legend holds that on one such visit, Lincoln ate an entire pot of one dozen broiled pigeons prepared as a family dinner. The house's connection to Lincoln was likely influential in its early preservation.

The Shastid House was listed on the National Register of Historic Places on June 26, 2003. The house is now owned by the Pike County Historical Society, which provides tours by appointment. The Society also operates the Pike County Historical Society Museum in Pittsfield.

== Design ==
The John Shastid House is a timber frame house, a style which used wooden beams for structural support. The house is built from squared beams connected by mortise and tenon joints, the characteristic method of timber-frame construction; the style differs from both log cabins, which used rounded logs, and balloon framing, which typically used nails and smaller beams. The beams were hewn rather than sawn, an unusual technique that likely resulted from Pittsfield's lack of a sawmill in 1838. Well-preserved timber-frame houses are rare in Illinois, and the Shastid House is the only surviving example of the method in Pittsfield.

== See also ==
- National Register of Historic Places listings in Pike County, Illinois
