= Summer Hill, Illinois =

Summer Hill
- Unincorporated community
- Location of Summer Hill within Illinois Summer Hill (the United States)
- Coordinates: 39°32′47″N 90°55′09″W
- Country: United States
- State: Illinois
- County: Pike
- Elevation: 758 ft (231 m)

Population (2000)
  - Total: 250
- Time zone: UTC-6 (CST)
  - Summer (DST): UTC-5 (CDT)
- ZIP code: 62363
- Area code: 217
- GNIS feature ID: 0419343

Summer Hill is an unincorporated community in Pike County, Illinois, United States. U.S. Route 54 runs through the town connecting it with Pittsfield approximately six miles to the northeast.

== History ==
Lyman Scott founded Summer Hill in 1845, one year after building a summer home at the site. Scott, a prominent local merchant, established and funded the community's first school shortly thereafter. Scott's house, which is listed on the National Register of Historic Places, is the oldest surviving home in the community.
