= Pittsfield Historic District =

Historic district in Illinois, United States

- U.S. National Register of Historic Places
- U.S. Historic district
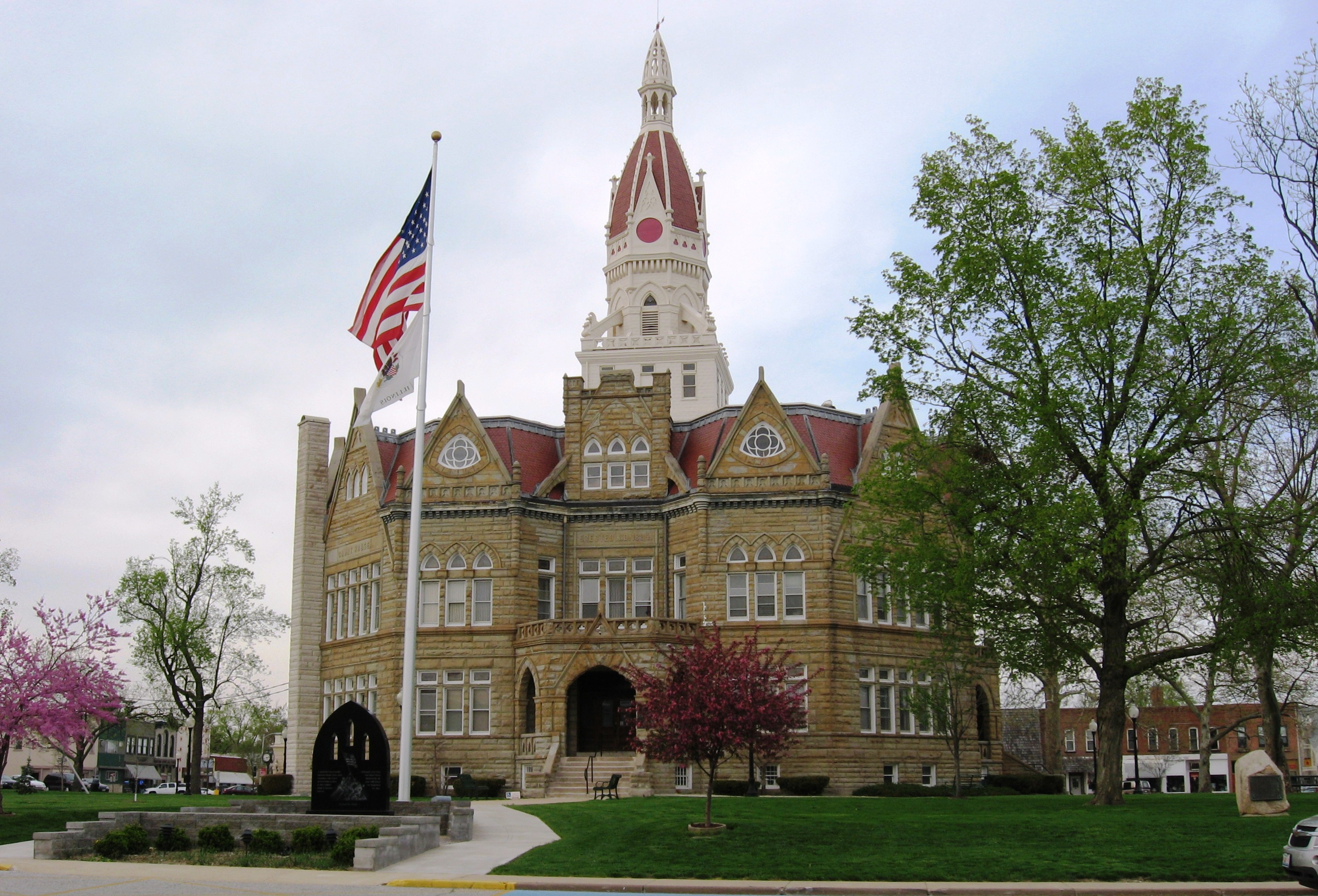
- Pike County Courthouse, near the center of the district, in 2008

- Location within Illinois Location within the United States
- Location: Roughly bounded by Washington Ct., Sycamore, Morrison and Griggsville Sts., Pittsfield, Illinois
- Coordinates: 39°36′35″N 90°48′30″W
- Area: 214 acres (87 ha)
- Architectural style: Italianate, Queen Anne
- NRHP reference No.: 80001404
- Added to NRHP: June 4, 1980

Pittsfield Historic District is a historic district in Pittsfield, Illinois, the county seat of Pike County. The district is centered on the Pike County Courthouse and the surrounding courthouse square; it also encompasses nearby residential areas. The courthouse was built in 1894–95; architect Henry Elliott based its Romanesque design off his earlier design for the Edgar County, Illinois, courthouse. The district's historic commercial buildings are mostly located on the courthouse square, which surrounds the courthouse; these buildings are mainly two-story brick structures. The Italianate and Queen Anne styles are prevalent among the district's houses, with the former being the most prominent; the Greek Revival and Federal styles are also common in the district's earlier homes.

The district was listed on the National Register of Historic Places on June 4, 1980.

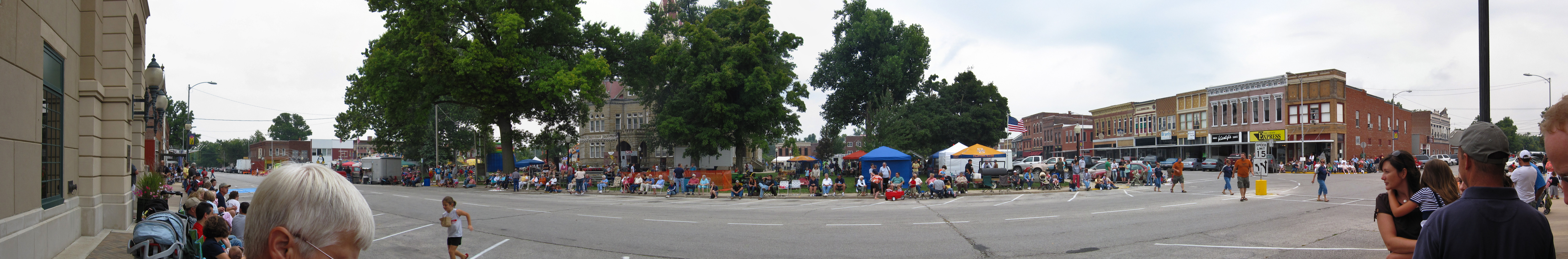
Panorama of the courthouse square; the courthouse is obscured by trees
