= Paul A. Shackel =

American anthropologist and archaeologist (born 1959)

Paul A. Shackel (born 1959) is an American anthropologist and a Professor of Anthropology in the Department of Anthropology at the University of Maryland, College Park. He joined the Department of Anthropology in 1996 after working for the National Park Service for seven and a half years. His research interests include Historical Archaeology, Civic Engagement, Social Justice, African Diaspora, Labor Archaeology, and Heritage Studies. He teaches courses in Historical Archaeology, The Anthropology of Work, Archaeology of the Chesapeake, and Method and Theory in Archaeology. He is the 2025 recipient of the J.C. Harrington Medal by the Society for Historical Archaeology.

== Education ==
Shackel earned his PhD in Anthropology, which was awarded with distinction, at the State University of New York at Buffalo in 1987. His dissertation focused on the archaeology and probate records from eighteenth-century Annapolis, Maryland and he described the development of modern behavior during early capitalism.

== Academic career ==
Shackel began his teaching career as an Adjunct Instructor, Department of Social Sciences, Suffolk Community College. During the summers of 1983 and 1984, he led a team of students in an archaeological excavation to locate the homestead of the founder of the Town of Islip, on Long Island. In 1984 and 1986 he served as an instructor in the Department of Anthropology at State University of New York at Buffalo, teaching Introduction to Archaeology, and Historical Archaeology. He co-taught a course with Barbara Little and Parker Potter in the Department of Social Sciences at Anne Arundel Community College in 1986. He served as a lecturer in the Department of Anthropology, University of Maryland in the 1987–88 academic year, and served as a Visiting Asst. Professor, Department of Anthropology, University of Maryland College Park in 1988–1989.

Shackel came to the Department of Anthropology at the University of Maryland and served as an Assistant Professor from 1996–1999; Associate Professor from 1999–2002 and Professor from 2002–present. He served as Department Chair from 2008-2020.

== Research projects ==
Shackel participated in the Archaeology in Annapolis project and earned his Ph.D. in 1987, examining archaeological materials, probate inventories, and courtesy/etiquette guidebooks. His dissertation examines the development of personal discipline and its relationship to the advent of the Industrial Revolution and the development of capitalism.

In 1989 Shackel began working for Harpers Ferry National Historical Park as an archaeologist, and he was part of a large program related to the restoration of Lower Town Harpers Ferry. His extensive work at Harpers Ferry delves into issues of class and labor and has resulted in several books and articles. In 1996, Shackel came to the University of Maryland, where he served as PI or Co-PI on several projects with the National Park Service.

In 2002 he helped to initiate a long-term archaeology project at New Philadelphia, Illinois, a multi-racial town that was founded by a freed African American in 1836. In the 1860s, the railroad bypassed New Philadelphia, and by the 1920s, it was virtually abandoned. In 2002 and 2003, the University of Maryland partnered with the Illinois State Museum (ISM), the University of Illinois (UI), and the friend's group, the New Philadelphia Association (NPA), to perform an archaeological survey of the land. In 2004, the University of Maryland received a 3-year National Science Foundation Research Experiences for Undergraduates award that allowed Shackel to partner with UI and ISM to train undergraduates in archaeology and explore issues of race, class, and ethnicity on the Illinois western frontier. New Philadelphia was placed on the National Register of Historic Places in 2005 and was designated as a National Historic Landmark in 2009. Helping to preserve the site, in 2010 The Archaeological Conservancy purchased 9 acres of the townsite. In 2014 a bill passed in the U.S. Senate and the United States House of Representatives to perform a Special Resource Study to determine the feasibility of making New Philadelphia a National Park. In December 2022, the site became the 424th National Park, and it is now known as New Philadelphia National Historic Site.

His work focuses on the anthracite region of Northeastern, Pennsylvania. During the fall and winter of 2010, an archaeological survey was conducted to locate the site of the Lattimer Massacre. In 1897, 25 miners of Eastern European descent were killed while protesting for equal pay and better working conditions. Documentary research, oral histories, and archaeological excavations of the domestic sites of coal miners and laborers in the coal patch towns of northeastern Pennsylvania are the emphasis of the Anthracite Heritage Project. Since 2015, archaeology, preservation, and heritage research has been conducted at Eckley Miners' Village, which is overseen by the Pennsylvania Historical and Museum Commission. This research focuses on issues related to labor, class, and historic and contemporary immigration. Work continues with the Anthracite Heritage Museum in Scranton, PA, to connect anthracite heritage with the established and newest immigrants to the region. In 2023 he worked with others to develop a web-based exhibition, “We Are Anthracite” (http://www.anthracitemuseum.org/we-are-anthracite/), hosted by the Anthracite Heritage Museum. The exhibition connects common experiences, past and present, to create a form of bridging social capital that connects these different populations. While the northeastern Pennsylvania immigrant story is not well-known, it is rich and complex, like many Rust Belt communities undergoing this major demographic shift.

== Publications ==
=== Books authored ===
- 1993 Personal Discipline and Material Culture: An Archaeology of Annapolis, Maryland, 1695–1870. The University of Tennessee Press, Knoxville, TN.
- 1996 Culture Change and The New Technology: An Archaeology of the Early American Industrial Era. Plenum Publishing Corp, New York, NY.
- 2000 Archaeology and Created Memory: Public History in a National Park. Kluwer Academic/Plenum Publishing, New York, NY.
- 2003 Memory in Black and White: Race, Commemoration, and the Post–Bellum Landscape. AltaMira Press, Walnut Creek, California.
- 2006 "They Worked Regular": Craft, Labor, Family and the Archaeology of an Industrial Community (with Matthew Palus). University of Tennessee Press, Knoxville.
- 2008 The Making of Harpers Ferry National Historical Park: A Devil, Two Rivers, and a Dream (with Teresa Moyer). AltaMira Press, Lanham, MD.
- 2009 An Archaeology of American Labor and Working Class Life. University of Florida Press, Gainesville, FL.
- 2011 New Philadelphia: An Archaeology of Race in the Heartland. University of California Press, Berkeley.
- 2014 Archaeology, Heritage and Civic Engagement: Working Toward the Public Good (with Barbara J. Little). Left Coast Press, Walnut Creek, CA.
- 2018 Remembering Lattimer: Migration, Labor, and Race in Pennsylvania Anthracite Country. University of Illinois Press, Champaign/Urbana, IL.
- 2020 An Archaeology of Unchecked Capitalism: From the American Rust Belt to the Developing World. NY: Berghahn Books.
- 2023 The Ruined Anthracite: Historical Trauma in Coal Mining Labor Communities. University of Illinois Press, Champaign/Urbana, IL.

=== Edited volumes ===
- 1992 Meanings and Uses of Material Culture (with Barbara J. Little). Historical Archaeology 26(3).
- 1994 An Archaeology of Harpers Ferry's Commercial and Residential District (with Susan E. Winter). Historical Archaeology 28(4).
- 1994 Historical Archaeology of The Chesapeake (with Barbara J. Little). Smithsonian Institution Press, Washington, DC.
- 1998 Annapolis Pasts: Contributions From Archaeology in Annapolis (with Paul Mullins and Mark S. Warner). The University of Tennessee Press, Knoxville, Tennessee.
- 2001 Myth, Memory and The Making of The American Landscape. University Press of Florida, Gainesville, Florida. (Paper edition issued in 2008).
- 2003 Remembering Landscapes of Conflict. Historical Archaeology 37(3).
- 2004 Places in Mind: Archaeology as Applied Anthropology (with Erve Chambers). Routledge Press, NY.
- 2007 Archaeology as a Tool of Civic Engagement (with Barbara Little). AltaMira Press, Lanham, Maryland. National Council for Public History Book Award finalist, 2008
- 2009 The Archaeology and Ethnography of Cultural Heritage Management (with David Gadsby and Antoinette Jackson) Practicing Anthropology 31(3).
- 2010 New Philadelphia: Racism, Community, and the Illinois (with Christopher Fennel and Terrance Martin) Historical Archaeology 44(1).
- 2011 Archaeologies of Engagement, Representation, and Identity (with David Gadsby) Historical Archaeology, 45(1).
- 2011 Heritage, Labour and the Working Class (with Laurajane Smith and Gary Campbell). Routledge Press, NY.
- 2013 Reversing the Narrative (with Michael Roller) Historical Archaeology, 47(3).
- 2014 Reprint of: Historical Archaeology of the Chesapeake (with Barbara J. Little). Percheron Press, Clinton Corners, New York.
- 2019. Heritages Haunting the American Narrative. (Hayes, Katherine, Barbara J. Little, and Paul A. Shackel. Eds.) International Journal of Heritage Studies. 25(7).

=== Selected articles in refereed journals ===
- 1987 Toward a Critical Archaeology (with Mark P. Leone and Parker B. Potter Jr.). Current Anthropology 28(3): 283–301.
- 1992 Post–Processual Approaches to Meanings and Uses of Material Culture (with Barbara J. Little). In Meanings and Uses of Material Culture, edited by Barbara J. Little and Paul A. Shackel. Historical Archaeology 26(3): 5–11.
- 1995 Terrible Saint: Changing Meanings of the John Brown Fort. Historical Archaeology 29(4): 11–25.
- 1998 Classical and Liberal Republicanism and the New Consumer Culture. International Journal of Historical Archaeology 2(1): 1–20.
- 2001 Public Memory and the Search for Power in American Historical Archaeology. American Anthropologist 102(3): 655–670.
- 2004 Labor's Heritage: Remembering the American Industrial Landscape. Historical Archaeology 38(4): 43–57.
- 2006 The Gilded Age: An Archaeology of Working-Class Communities (with Matthew Palus). American Anthropologist 108(4): 828-841.
- 2012 "The Gilded Age Wasn’t So Gilded in the Anthracite Region of Pennsylvania (with Michael Roller)." International Journal of Historical Archaeology 16(4): 761-775.
- 2013 An Historical Archaeology of Labor and Social Justice. American Anthropologist 115(2): 212-215.
- 2016 The Meaning of Place in the Anthracite Region of Northeastern Pennsylvania. International Journal of Heritage Studies 22(3): 200-213. doi.org/10.1080/13527258.2015.1114009
- 2017 Transgenerational Impact of Structural Violence: Epigenetics and the Legacy of Anthracite Coal. International Journal of Historical Archaeology. doi.org/10.1007/s10761-017-0451-0
- 2018 "Immigration Heritage in the Anthracite Coal Region of Northeastern Pennsylvania." Journal of Community Archaeology & Heritage 5(2):101-113. doi.org/10.1080/20518196.2017.1385947
- 2018 "Structural Violence and the Industrial Landscape." International Journal of Heritage Studies. doi.org/10.1080/13527258.2018.1517374
- 2019 “Structural Violence and the Industrial Landscape.” International Journal of Heritage Studies 25(7): 750-762. doi.org/10.1080/13527258.2018.1517374
- 2023 (with Brown, Madeline) “Text Mining Oral Histories in Historical Archaeology.” International Journal of Historical Archaeology 27(3): 865-881. doi.org/10.1007/s10761-022-00680-5
- 2023 (with Brown, Madeline) “Anthracite Memories: Semantic Tagging and Coal Mining Oral Histories.” International Journal of Heritage Studies 29(11): 1178-1194. doi.org/10.1080/13527258.2023.2243461
- 2023 “Remembering Labor Conflict as an American Battlefield.” Special Issue: Back to the Battlefields: Historians Take a Fresh Look at American Sites of Conflict. Parks Stewardship Forum: The Interdisciplinary Journal of Place-Based Conservation 39(3): 389-402. doi.org/10.5070/P539362024
- 2024 (with Neurock-Schriner, Aryn) “Past and Present: Immigration and Museum Exhibitions in the Anthracite Coal Region.” Museum Anthropology 47(1): 13-22. doi.org/10.1111/muan.12281
- 2024 “The Unchecked Capitalism Behind the Bird’s Eye View.” Pennsylvania History: A Journal of Mid-Atlantic Studies 91(1): 26-46. doi.org/10.5325/pennhistory.91.1.0026
- 2024 “Radical Hope: Re-Contextualizing Oral Histories from Deindustrialized Mining Communities.” International Journal of Heritage Studies 30(5): 507-518. doi.org/10.1080/13527258.2024.2320322
- 2025 “Recovering Psychological Trauma in Coal Mining Communities.” Labor History. doi.org/10.1080/0023656X.2024.2426017
- 2025 “’For God and Country:’ Memory of the 1912 Lawrence Textile Strike.” International Journal of Heritage Studies 31(4): 458-472. doi.org/10.1080/13527258.2024.2443916

== Awards ==
- 2004 – Choice Award, for Outstanding Academic Title: Memory in Black and White (2003 AtltaMira)
- 2006 – National Society Daughters of the American Revolution Historic Preservation Medal: For work to place New Philadelphia on the National Register of Historic Places.
- 2007 – Ethel Jane Westfeldt Bunting Fellow: School for Advanced Research Summer Fellowship. Santa Fe, New Mexico.
- 2008 – NCPH Book Award finalist for Archaeology as a Tool of Civic Engagement (w/Barbara Little).
- 2015 – WCRM Distinguished Scholar Lecture, Department of Anthropology at the University of Denver, Denver, CO, February
- 2016 – Resident Scholar, Center for Heritage and Museum Studies, Australian National University, Canberra, Australia, October
- 2017 – Resident Scholar, Institute for Advanced Study, University of Minnesota, Minneapolis, MN, April
- 2019 – Mark E. Mack Community Engagement Award, Society for Historical Archaeology, (Anthracite Heritage Project)
- 2025 – J.C. Harrington Award, Society for Historical Archaeology
