= Free Frank McWorter =

Formerly enslaved African American (1777–1854)

- Born: c.1777 South Carolina, United States
- Died: September 7, 1854 (aged 76–77); Illinois, United States
- Resting place: Illinois
- Other name: Frank McWorter
- Known for: Founder of New Philadelphia in Illinois, the first black man in the U.S. to register a town
- Spouse: Lucy (married 1799)

Free Frank McWorter (c. 1777 – September 7, 1854) was an American born into slavery who bought his freedom in Kentucky and in 1836 founded the town of New Philadelphia in Illinois; he was the first African American to plat and register a town, and establish a planned community in the United States. The New Philadelphia town site was designated a National Historic Landmark in 2009 and made a National Park Service site in 2022.

Frank McWorter was born enslaved on a Southern plantation to an enslaved African-American mother. His and his mother's white enslaver was also his biological father. As an adult, in his spare time, after completing work for his enslaver (and father), Frank was allowed to use a cave to gather and prepare for sale saltpeter, a natural ingredient for gunpowder. In this way, Frank saved sufficient funds first to buy his wife's freedom, and Frank then bought his own (thus, he became "Free" Frank). He eventually gave up his saltpeter operation in exchange for the freedom of some of his children and moved to Illinois. Over several decades, McWorter and his estate spent about $500,000 (in 2021 dollars) to buy the freedom of some 15 to 22 enslaved family members in Kentucky. Several of these freedom purchases were financed by selling his New Philadelphia lots.

In the late 20th century, a local history group recruited archaeologists to explore the long-abandoned Illinois town site. Teams from the University of Maryland, College Park, University of Illinois, Urbana-Champaign, and DePaul University have worked for years on research and excavations, collected data about residents from census and land records, and turned up thousands of artifacts. In addition, they have trained students at summer field schools and published reports, articles, and books on the history of McWorter, his family, and his town.

McWorter's descendants donated the collected 11 volumes of documentation to the Abraham Lincoln Presidential Library in February 2008. In addition, the family donated a bronze bust of Frank McWorter by his great-great-granddaughter Shirley McWorter Moss.

== Biography ==
Frank McWorter was born in 1777 into slavery in South Carolina to Juda, born in West Africa, abducted into slavery and transported to the colony. His father was likely her white enslaver, George McWhorter, a Scots-Irish planter. According to family tradition, Juda had to convince McWhorter to allow his mixed-race son to live.

In 1795, McWhorter moved to Pulaski County, Kentucky, and took Frank to build and later manage his holdings there. Frank tended the farm, but McWhorter also leased him to work for neighbors as a laborer. From being hired out, Frank learned business skills and earned more money than his master required him to hand over. After McWhorter moved to Tennessee, he continued having Frank manage his Kentucky farm. Frank used his savings to create a saltpeter production operation, for which considerable demand was during the War of 1812.

=== Marriage and family ===
In 1799, Frank married Lucy, an enslaved African American on a neighboring plantation. They had 13 children born into slavery, of whom four – Juda, Frank, Sally, and Solomon – survived. By 1817, Frank had earned enough money to buy Lucy from her master for $800 (~$21,319 in 2025). She was pregnant at the time with their son Squire, and because she was now free, he was (later) freeborn. Two years later, in 1819, Frank bought his freedom at the same price. He then called himself "Free Frank", which served as notice that he was legally free and that it was known to townspeople that he was free. It was not uncommon for free black citizens to be kidnapped and enslaved. In 1829, Free Frank traded his saltpeter plant for the freedom of his son Frank, who had fled to Canada and was a fugitive. This allowed his son to return to the United States as a free man. By this time, he and Lucy also had three surviving freeborn children: Squire, Commodore, and Lucy Ann.

=== Move to Illinois ===
In 1830, Frank, Lucy, and their four free children moved to Pike County, Illinois. By the second year, they started farming. In 1836, Frank filed a plat to create the village of New Philadelphia on 80 acres (320,000 m^{2}) that he had purchased from the federal government for $100 (~$3,071 in 2025). The town site, divided into 144 lots, was registered with government authorities in 1836. McWorter established residence in New Philadelphia with his family and sold other lots to new residents. Both blacks and whites settled there and supported an integrated school. It was the crossroads of an agricultural community and, when founded, proposed as being on the route of a planned Illinois-Michigan canal (which was never built.)

In 1837, Free Frank petitioned the Illinois legislature (as was required) to officially take the surname McWorter. In that same year, the legislation was passed to "make 'Frank McWorter' his legal name." This technicality gave him certain rights normally reserved for white men in Illinois. He could bring lawsuits to court and legally marry his wife of more than 40 years. But, he still could not vote."

McWorter was the first black man in the United States to incorporate a municipality. He served as mayor of New Philadelphia, which was soon settled by African and European Americans, for years.

McWorter lived most of the rest of his life in western Illinois, with intervals in Kentucky before the American Civil War to buy freedom for his three grown children and grandchildren left in Kentucky. For instance, in 1835, he returned and purchased the freedom of his son Solomon. On each trip, he risked capture by unscrupulous slave traders despite his legally free status.

- Free Frank McWorter Grave Site
- U.S. National Register of Historic Places
- Location within Illinois Location within the United States
- Location: Pike County, Illinois
- Nearest city: Barry
- Coordinates: 39°41′41″N 91°2′27″W
- Area: less than one acre
- Built: 1854
- NRHP reference No.: 87002533
- Added to NRHP: April 19, 1988

McWorter died on September 7, 1854; by then, he had bought the freedom of eight more of his relatives. Through his work, he gained freedom for 16 members of his family. His heirs used his inheritance to free seven more relatives.

== Town's decline ==
In 1869, the first railroad was built through Pike County, bypassing New Philadelphia to the north for Baylis, which had a train station. Businesses moved there for better access. The population of New Philadelphia rapidly declined. By the end of the nineteenth century, some townsites had reverted to farmland for cultivation, but other areas were inhabited through the 1920s.

== Legacy ==
- McWorter's gravesite was listed on the National Register of Historic Places in 1988. It is located about 4 miles east of Barry, Illinois, off U.S. Route 36.
- A portion of I-72 in Pike County was designated the Frank McWorter Memorial Highway.
- The New Philadelphia Town Site was listed on the National Register of Historic Places in 2005 and designated a National Historic Landmark in 2009.
