= Barry Historic District =

Historic district in Illinois, United States

- U.S. National Register of Historic Places
- U.S. Historic district
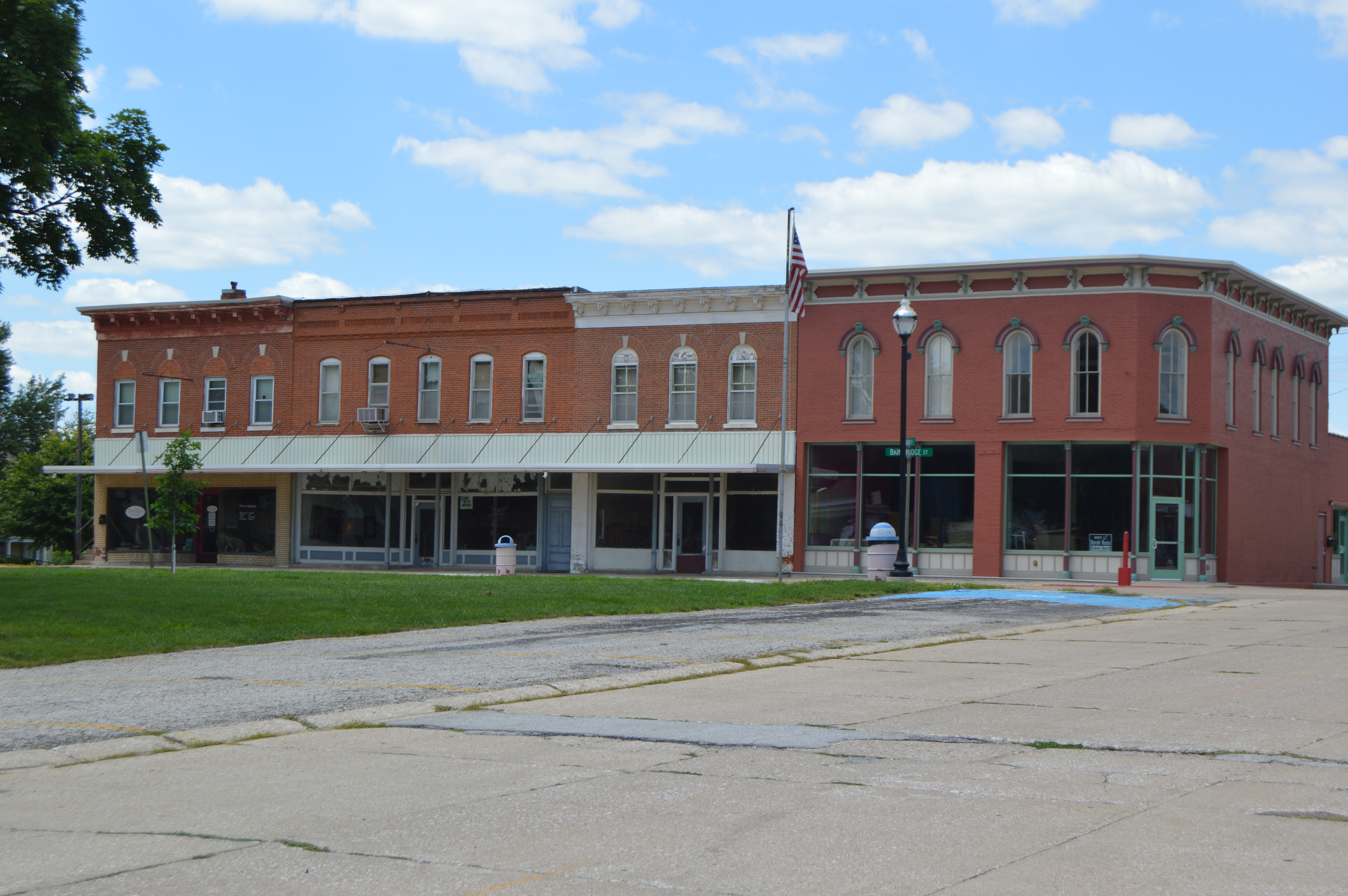
- Western side of the public square

- Location within Illinois Location within the United States
- Location: U.S. 36, Barry, Illinois
- Coordinates: 39°41′41″N 91°2′27″W
- Area: 103 acres (42 ha)
- Built: Various
- NRHP reference No.: 79000862
- Added to NRHP: March 13, 1979

Barry Historic District is a historic district comprising the commercial and older residential areas of Barry, Pike County, Illinois. Barry was founded as an agricultural community in the 1830s, and most of its development took place between its founding and the Civil War. The city's commercial core, however, was mainly built in 1894 after a fire destroyed most of the existing commercial buildings. The 1894 buildings are well-preserved examples of typical commercial architecture of the period, and several have metal storefronts. The district also includes Barry's "Diamond Hill" residential district on Mortimer Street east of Brown Street and several other residential sections. Prominent architectural styles in the residential areas include Italianate, Queen Anne, Carpenter Gothic, and vernacular types from the late 19th century.

The district was added to the National Register of Historic Places on March 13, 1979.
