= Barry, Illinois =

- City
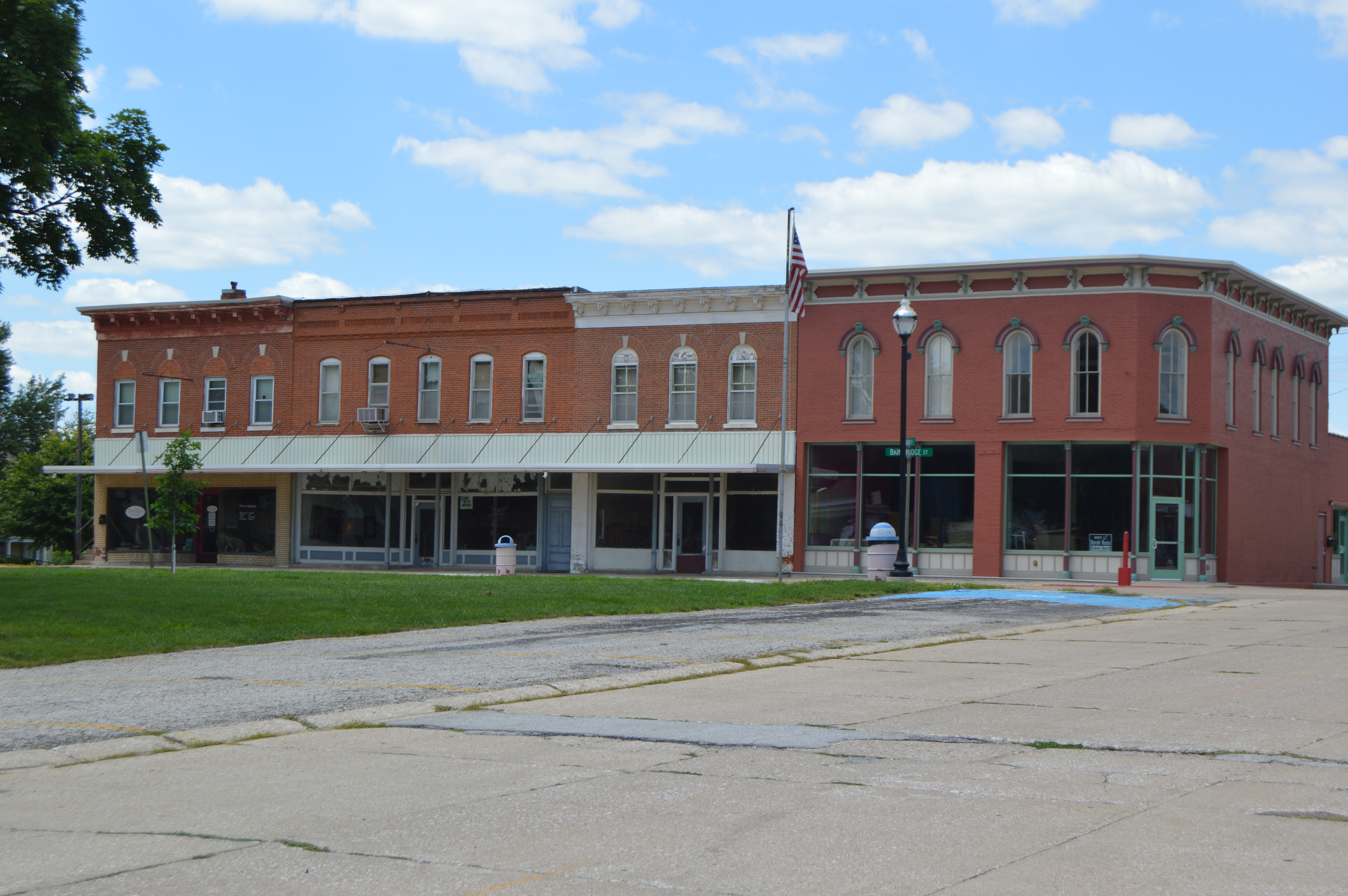
- Downtown buildings

- Seal

- Location of Barry in Pike County, Illinois.
- Coordinates: 39°41′54″N 91°02′24″W
- Country: United States
- State: Illinois
- County: Pike
- Township: Barry, Hadley
- Established: 1836
- Incorporated (city): 1872

Area
  - Total: 1.43 sq mi (3.71 km^{2})
  - Land: 1.43 sq mi (3.71 km^{2})
  - Water: 0 sq mi (0.00 km^{2})
- Elevation: 673 ft (205 m)

Population (2020)
  - Total: 1,303
  - Density: 909.8/sq mi (351.26/km^{2})
- Time zone: UTC-6 (CST)
  - Summer (DST): UTC-5 (CDT)
- ZIP Code(s): 62312
- Area code: 217
- FIPS code: 17-03948
- GNIS feature ID: 2394070
- Website: www.barryil.org

Barry is a city in Pike County, Illinois, United States. The population was 1,303 at the 2020 census.

== History ==
Barry was previously known as Worcester, which was platted in 1836. In 1839, residents petitioned to establish a post office, but because there was already a post office named Worcester, a new name was required. The name 'Barre' was chosen after Barre, Vermont, the home city of a prominent settler, Mary Brown, who was arbitrarily selected to choose a name. The state clerk misrecorded the name as 'Barry'.

In 1872, Barry was incorporated as a city.

== Geography ==
According to the 2010 census, Barry has a total area of 1.41 square miles (3.65 km^{2}), all land.

== Demographics ==
Historical population
Census	Pop.	Note	%±
1880	1,392		—
1890	1,354		−2.7%
1900	1,643		21.3%
1910	1,647		0.2%
1920	1,490		−9.5%
1930	1,506		1.1%
1940	1,545		2.6%
1950	1,529		−1.0%
1960	1,422		−7.0%
1970	1,444		1.5%
1980	1,487		3.0%
1990	1,391		−6.5%
2000	1,368		−1.7%
2010	1,318		−3.7%
2020	1,303		−1.1%
U.S. Decennial Census

=== 2020 census ===
As of the 2020 census, Barry had a population of 1,303. The median age was 41.3 years. 23.2% of residents were under the age of 18 and 23.2% of residents were 65 years of age or older. For every 100 females there were 85.1 males, and for every 100 females age 18 and over there were 82.7 males age 18 and over.

0.0% of residents lived in urban areas, while 100.0% lived in rural areas.

There were 513 households in Barry, of which 28.5% had children under the age of 18 living in them. Of all households, 41.1% were married-couple households, 17.7% were households with a male householder and no spouse or partner present, and 31.8% were households with a female householder and no spouse or partner present. About 32.4% of all households were made up of individuals and 15.4% had someone living alone who was 65 years of age or older.

There were 590 housing units, of which 13.1% were vacant. The homeowner vacancy rate was 3.0% and the rental vacancy rate was 8.4%.

Racial composition as of the 2020 census
Race	Number	Percent
White	1,216	93.3%
Black or African American	4	0.3%
American Indian and Alaska Native	3	0.2%
Asian	7	0.5%
Native Hawaiian and Other Pacific Islander	0	0.0%
Some other race	8	0.6%
Two or more races	65	5.0%
Hispanic or Latino (of any race)	21	1.6%

=== 2010 census ===
As of the census of 2010, there were 1,318 people, 545 households, and 341 families living in the city.

=== 2000 census ===
As of the census of 2000, there were 1,368 people, 552 households, and 363 families living in the city. The population density was 1,198.0 inhabitants per square mile (462.6/km^{2}). There were 623 housing units at an average density of 545.6 per square mile (210.7/km^{2}). The racial makeup of the city was 99.42% White, 0.44% Asian, and 0.15% from two or more races. Hispanic or Latino of any race were 0.80% of the population.

There were 552 households, out of which 29.5% had children under the age of 18 living with them, 52.5% were married couples living together, 10.3% had a female householder with no husband present, and 34.2% were non-families. 32.4% of all households were made up of individuals, and 20.3% had someone living alone who was 65 years of age or older. The average household size was 2.32 and the average family size was 2.91.

In the city, the population was spread out, with 23.2% under the age of 18, 7.4% from 18 to 24, 24.3% from 25 to 44, 21.4% from 45 to 64, and 23.8% who were 65 years of age or older. The median age was 41 years. For every 100 females, there were 84.6 males. For every 100 females age 18 and over, there were 79.4 males.

The median income for a household in the city was $27,635, and the median income for a family was $37,143. Males had a median income of $26,607 versus $18,050 for females. The per capita income for the city was $18,097. About 9.2% of families and 11.5% of the population were below the poverty line, including 13.4% of those under age 18 and 14.0% of those age 65 or over.

== Notable people ==
- Floyd Dell, novelist, playwright, poet and literary critic; managing editor (The Masses); born in Barry.
- George Nicol, pitcher and outfielder for four teams; born in Barry.
- Lottie Holman O'Neill, state representative; first female member of the General Assembly.
- Cliff Padgett (1879–1951), motorboat builder
- Ernie Triplett, racing driver
- Scott Wike, U.S. Representative, Assistant Secretary of the Treasury to Grover Cleveland; died in Barry

== See also ==
- Barry Historic District
- Free Frank McWorter Grave Site
- New Philadelphia National Historic Site
