= Pittsfield, Illinois =

- City
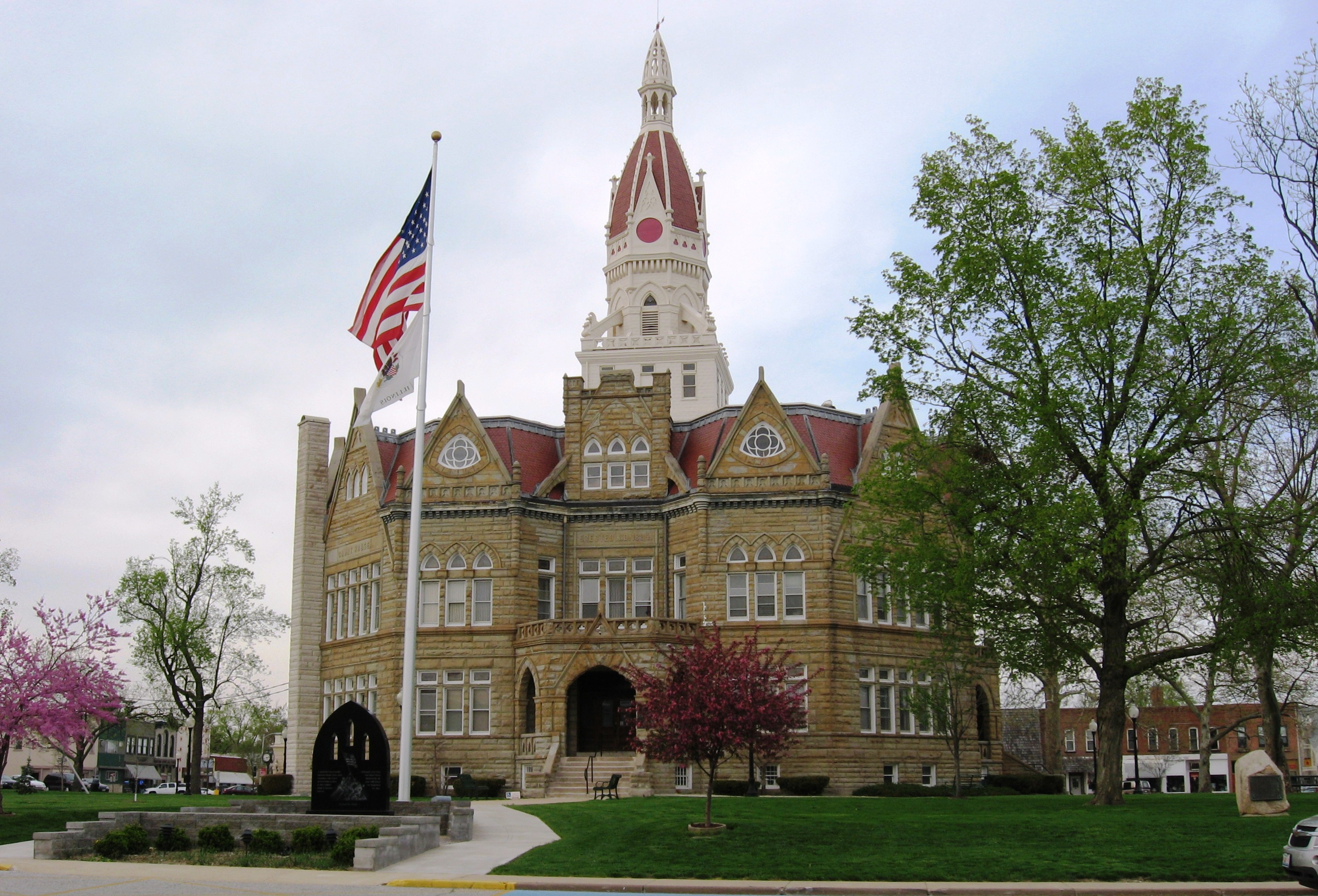
- Pike County Courthouse

- Seal
- Interactive map of Pittsfield, Illinois
- Location within Illinois Location within the United States
- Coordinates: 39°37′28″N 90°46′25″W
- Country: USA
- State: Illinois
- County: Pike
- Townships: Pittsfield, Newburg

Area
  - Total: 5.17 sq mi (13.39 km^{2})
  - Land: 4.78 sq mi (12.39 km^{2})
  - Water: 0.39 sq mi (1.00 km^{2})
- Elevation: 732 ft (223 m)

Population (2020)
  - Total: 4,206
  - Density: 879.5/sq mi (339.58/km^{2})
- Time zone: UTC-6 (CST)
  - Summer (DST): UTC-5 (CDT)
- ZIP code: 62363
- Area code: 217
- FIPS code: 17-60222
- GNIS feature ID: 2396217
- Website: www.pittsfieldil.org

Pittsfield is a city in and the county seat of Pike County, Illinois, United States. The population was 4,206 at the 2020 census, a decrease from 4,576 in 2010.

== History ==
Pittsfield was initially settled by settlers from New England. These settlers were of old Yankee stock, descended from the English Puritans who had founded and settled New England in the 1600s. A group of settlers from Pittsfield, Massachusetts headed west and settled this region of Illinois in 1820. When they arrived the area was a virgin wilderness, they constructed farms, roads and government buildings.

As county seat, the town was one of the various places in central Illinois where Abraham Lincoln practiced law as part of the circuit court, working on 34 cases between 1839 and 1852. One local newspaper, now known as the Pike Press, was then owned by another of Lincoln's future secretaries, John Nicolay, and featured an editorial containing one of the first known suggestions of Lincoln as the Republican nominee for the presidency. Pittsfield was also home to John Hay, Lincoln's personal secretary, ambassador to England under President William McKinley, later Secretary of State for Theodore Roosevelt and creator of the Open Door Policy.

Pittsfield is the self-proclaimed "Pork Capital" of the Midwest, owing to the long history of pork production in the region, which fed into the large meat-packing industry of Chicago. Though agriculture in the region is no longer so dependent on pork, the town still hosts a yearly "Pig Days" festival.

The local high school football team, the Saukees, still holds the record for longest winning streak in the state, and the 21st longest in the country. Starting with their season opening 6–0 win over North Greene in 1966, the Pittsfield Saukees reeled off 64 consecutive wins, which included 15 straight shutouts between 1969 and 1971. In 1970, the team outscored their opponents 341-0 and allowed negative rushing yards for the season. The streak extended all the way through to the second game of the 1973 season, when Pittsfield dropped a 12-0 decision to Winchester, Illinois.

Pittsfield's Saukees basketball team won the Illinois State basketball title in 1991 under Coach David T. Bennett, who was later installed into the Illinois Basketball Hall of Fame. Exactly 20 years later in 2011, the Saukees would return to the Illinois State basketball court and take home 4th place under Coach Brad Tomhave.

Pittsfield is the setting for Jamie Gilson's book Hello, My Name Is Scrambled Eggs. Singer/songwriter Sufjan Stevens wrote a song about Pittsfield on his album The Avalanche.

== Geography ==
Pittsfield is on U.S. Route 54 between the Mississippi River approximately eight miles to the southwest and the Illinois River approximately eight miles to the east. Bay Creek flows past just north and east of the city.

According to the 2010 census, Pittsfield has a total area of 4.968 square miles (12.87 km^{2}), of which 4.58 square miles (11.86 km^{2}) (or 92.19%) is land and 0.388 square miles (1.00 km^{2}) (or 7.81%) is water.

Pittsfield's drinking water supply is provided by Lake Pittsfield, an artificial reservoir held in by an earth and concrete dam. The 200-acre (0.81 km^{2}) lake is located within a 680-acre (2.8 km^{2}) park that has become a prime recreational area offering boating, fishing, RV and primitive camping, hiking, disc golf, and other outdoor activities.

Pittsfield, along with the bulk of Pike County, is located in the land between the Illinois and Mississippi rivers as they move toward convergence in St. Louis. The land is riddled with streams and bottom lands mostly draining through the McGee Creek drainage basin into the Illinois River. Thus, the land around Pittsfield and Pike County is much more hilly and forested than the rest of the plains of central Illinois. This geography, combined with a relative lack of heavy development, make the areas around Pittsfield particularly suited to wildlife. Pittsfield regularly attracts large numbers of out-of-state game hunters, and Pike county consistently leads all other Illinois counties in the number of deer harvested during fall hunting seasons.

=== Landmarks ===
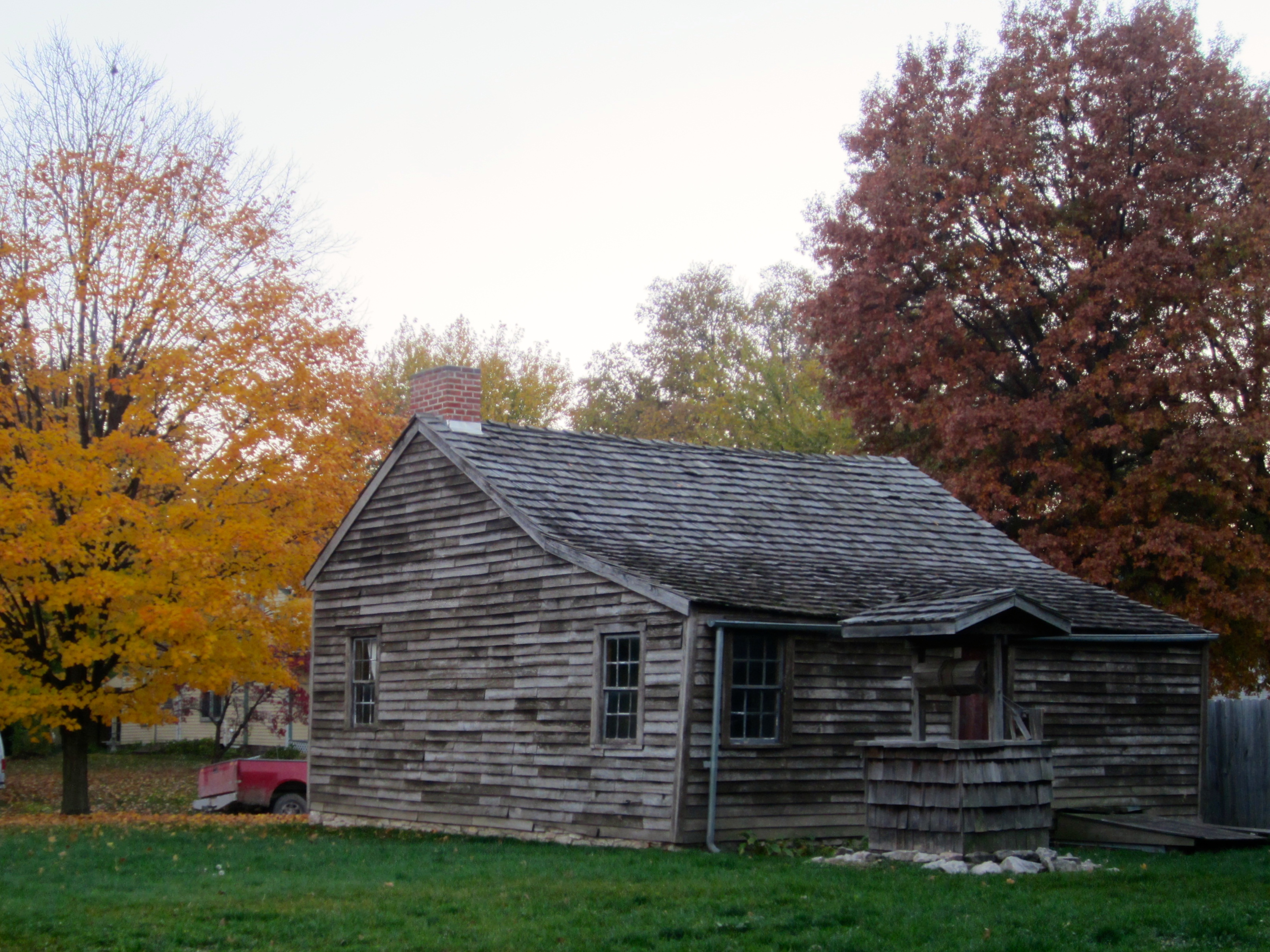
The Shastid House, one of the historic buildings in Pittsfield.

Pittsfield is home to the most locations in the world that have documented connections to Abraham Lincoln. There are nine homes still in existence in Pittsfield that are connected to Lincoln, including the Shastid House, where Lincoln often stayed while practicing cases in the county. His personally signed documents have been stolen from the courthouse. Many people in the county have seen them and know they exist. The public is alerted to watch for them, should they surface at sales, in museums, or private collections. The dockets listing Lincoln's cases still remain, stored in ancient records in the courthouse basement.

There are many historic landmarks within the city limits, the most notable of which is the Pike County Courthouse. The courthouse was designed by Architect Henry Elliott of Chicago and Jacksonville. Contractors were Yeager and Schultz of Danville, Illinois. The courthouse was to be completed within 400 days after the signing of the contract at a cost of $45,000. Groundbreaking for the courthouse was on May 11, 1894. The cornerstone was laid on July 12, 1894, and the dedication of the new courthouse was on November 16, 1895. Robert Franklin, a master mason from Nebo, Illinois designed and supervised the keystone architecture of the courthouse. It was the third courthouse in Pittsfield and the fifth in Pike County. The building is of octagon shape 96 x 96 feet of Cleveland sandstone veneering, backed by heavy walls of brick; the dimensions over all, is over the steps and porches, is 119 feet by 119 feet. Four entrances, all exactly alike, face the four cardinal points – north, south, east, and west.

The entrances are large, double doors of oak and glass and are overhung with beautiful stone porches. The park in which the building stands is 340 feet square. There are four sidewalks leading up to the doors of the courthouse and a sidewalk circles the building. From the center of the building rise the graceful outlines of the tower and dome to an imposing height of 136 feet. The corridors, which cross under the dome are ten feet in width, with marbled tiled floors, wainscoting and frescoed ceilings. Standing on the lower floor in the center of the corridor under the dome and looking upward, one may observe a beautiful concave of colored lights which spans the vault of the rotunda at a point near the top of the main building. The dome roof is of red slate. Total cost of building and fixtures was $68,520. The Pike County Illinois Courthouse is widely recognized as one of the most beautiful courthouses in the state and the Midwest. The Pike County Illinois courthouse was the fifth courthouse designed by Mr Elliott who also designed the Greene County Courthouse (1891) in Carrollton, Illinois; Edgar County Courthouse (1891) in Paris, Illinois; Jersey County Courthouse (1893) in Jerseyville, Illinois; and DeWitt County Illinois Courthouse (1893) in Clinton, Illinois. The DeWitt County Courthouse was demolished in 1987.

The East Ward School, built between 1861 and 1866, was designed by Architect John M. Van Osdel, who also designed the Palmer House in Chicago, as well as the Governor's Mansion in Springfield. John Houston of Griggsville built the school for the contract price of $35,000, which was financed by bonding. The building is stone (boated from Joliet on the Illinois river) and brick burned in Pittsfield. Both the grade school and high school were located in this building. At the completion of the East School in 1866, it was one of the finest and largest buildings of its kind in the state and "fulfilled the requirements of a modern school plant." Original blackboards were simply black paint on the plastered walls. Generally, they were completely around the room, including between the windows. The original building was heated by hot air piped from furnaces in the basement. There were no inside toilet facilities, but there were outside "privies" located east of the building next to the street. Presently, restrooms are in the basement, through the side doors near the front. Its large clock and bell were donated by Colonel Ross and mounted in the tower. The Clock Tower is one of the few tower clocks in its original state left in the United States. The school closed in 1955 and was unoccupied until 1978 when it was renovated and became the home of the Pike County Historical Society and the Pike County Historic Museum.

The William Watson hotel was built in 1838, and called Mansion House, by William Watson, who was the first settler of Pittsfield. The original hotel is said to have been a frequent stop for Abraham Lincoln and many of his contemporaries.

=== Climate ===
Climate data for Pittsfield, Illinois, 1991–2020 normals, extremes 1995–present
| Month | Jan | Feb | Mar | Apr | May | Jun | Jul | Aug | Sep | Oct | Nov | Dec | Year |
|---|---|---|---|---|---|---|---|---|---|---|---|---|---|
| Record high °F (°C) | 71 (22) | 78 (26) | 83 (28) | 90 (32) | 96 (36) | 103 (39) | 104 (40) | 104 (40) | 97 (36) | 93 (34) | 84 (29) | 73 (23) | 104 (40) |
| Mean maximum °F (°C) | 60.1 (15.6) | 64.4 (18.0) | 76.1 (24.5) | 84.9 (29.4) | 89.1 (31.7) | 94.5 (34.7) | 95.5 (35.3) | 96.6 (35.9) | 98.8 (37.1) | 84.5 (29.2) | 73.9 (23.3) | 63.5 (17.5) | 98.2 (36.8) |
| Mean daily maximum °F (°C) | 36.5 (2.5) | 41.9 (5.5) | 53.0 (11.7) | 65.8 (18.8) | 75.4 (24.1) | 84.1 (28.9) | 87.5 (30.8) | 86.5 (30.3) | 80.1 (26.7) | 67.9 (19.9) | 53.8 (12.1) | 41.5 (5.3) | 64.5 (18.1) |
| Daily mean °F (°C) | 27.5 (−2.5) | 32.1 (0.1) | 42.2 (5.7) | 54.1 (12.3) | 64.6 (18.1) | 73.6 (23.1) | 76.8 (24.9) | 75.1 (23.9) | 67.4 (19.7) | 55.8 (13.2) | 43.5 (6.4) | 32.6 (0.3) | 53.8 (12.1) |
| Mean daily minimum °F (°C) | 18.5 (−7.5) | 22.3 (−5.4) | 31.5 (−0.3) | 42.4 (5.8) | 53.9 (12.2) | 63.0 (17.2) | 66.1 (18.9) | 63.7 (17.6) | 54.8 (12.7) | 43.8 (6.6) | 33.3 (0.7) | 23.7 (−4.6) | 43.1 (6.2) |
| Mean minimum °F (°C) | −0.6 (−18.1) | 0.8 (−17.3) | 13.8 (−10.1) | 27.8 (−2.3) | 38.3 (3.5) | 51.3 (10.7) | 56.2 (13.4) | 52.5 (11.4) | 42.0 (5.6) | 28.9 (−1.7) | 17.8 (−7.9) | 5.7 (−14.6) | −5.0 (−20.6) |
| Record low °F (°C) | −25 (−32) | −18 (−28) | −7 (−22) | 18 (−8) | 29 (−2) | 44 (7) | 50 (10) | 45 (7) | 33 (1) | 26 (−3) | 6 (−14) | −10 (−23) | −25 (−32) |
| Average precipitation inches (mm) | 2.03 (52) | 2.14 (54) | 2.95 (75) | 4.14 (105) | 4.83 (123) | 5.01 (127) | 4.10 (104) | 3.43 (87) | 3.61 (92) | 3.01 (76) | 2.92 (74) | 2.33 (59) | 40.5 (1,028) |
| Average snowfall inches (cm) | 4.0 (10) | 5.1 (13) | 1.7 (4.3) | 0.3 (0.76) | 0.0 (0.0) | 0.0 (0.0) | 0.0 (0.0) | 0.0 (0.0) | 0.0 (0.0) | 0.0 (0.0) | 1.1 (2.8) | 3.4 (8.6) | 15.6 (39.46) |
| Average precipitation days (≥ 0.01 in) | 6.2 | 6.5 | 8.8 | 10.7 | 12.2 | 10.3 | 8.4 | 7.7 | 7.8 | 8.4 | 7.8 | 6.8 | 101.6 |
| Average snowy days (≥ 0.1 in) | 2.6 | 2.5 | 0.8 | 0.1 | 0.0 | 0.0 | 0.0 | 0.0 | 0.0 | 0.0 | 0.4 | 1.9 | 8.3 |
Source 1: NOAA
Source 2: National Weather Service (mean maxima/minima 2006–2020)

== Demographics ==
Historical population
| Census | Pop. | Note | %± |
|---|---|---|---|
| 1850 | 637 | | — |
| 1870 | 1,621 | | — |
| 1880 | 2,104 | | 29.8% |
| 1890 | 2,295 | | 9.1% |
| 1900 | 2,293 | | −0.1% |
| 1910 | 2,095 | | −8.6% |
| 1920 | 2,129 | | 1.6% |
| 1930 | 2,356 | | 10.7% |
| 1940 | 2,884 | | 22.4% |
| 1950 | 3,564 | | 23.6% |
| 1960 | 4,089 | | 14.7% |
| 1970 | 4,244 | | 3.8% |
| 1980 | 4,170 | | −1.7% |
| 1990 | 4,231 | | 1.5% |
| 2000 | 4,211 | | −0.5% |
| 2010 | 4,576 | | 8.7% |
| 2020 | 4,206 | | −8.1% |
U.S. Decennial Census

=== 2020 census ===
As of the 2020 census, Pittsfield had a population of 4,206. The median age was 42.5 years. 21.1% of residents were under the age of 18 and 25.2% of residents were 65 years of age or older. For every 100 females there were 93.8 males, and for every 100 females age 18 and over there were 90.7 males age 18 and over.

0.0% of residents lived in urban areas, while 100.0% lived in rural areas.

There were 1,804 households in Pittsfield, of which 24.7% had children under the age of 18 living in them. Of all households, 45.1% were married-couple households, 17.3% were households with a male householder and no spouse or partner present, and 31.6% were households with a female householder and no spouse or partner present. About 36.3% of all households were made up of individuals and 18.8% had someone living alone who was 65 years of age or older.

There were 2,034 housing units, of which 11.3% were vacant. The homeowner vacancy rate was 2.4% and the rental vacancy rate was 14.4%.

Racial composition as of the 2020 census
| Race | Number | Percent |
|---|---|---|
| White | 3,937 | 93.6% |
| Black or African American | 48 | 1.1% |
| American Indian and Alaska Native | 18 | 0.4% |
| Asian | 19 | 0.5% |
| Native Hawaiian and Other Pacific Islander | 0 | 0.0% |
| Some other race | 48 | 1.1% |
| Two or more races | 136 | 3.2% |
| Hispanic or Latino (of any race) | 130 | 3.1% |

=== 2000 census ===
As of the 2000 census, there were 4,211 people, 1,805 households, and 1,126 families residing in the city. The population density was 1,178.2 inhabitants per square mile (454.9/km^{2}). There were 1,985 housing units at an average density of 555.4 per square mile (214.4/km^{2}). The racial makeup of the city was 98.43% White, 0.21% African American, 0.19% Native American, 0.36% Asian, 0.17% from other races, and 0.64% from two or more races. Hispanic or Latino of any race were 0.62% of the population.

There were 1,805 households, out of which 25.8% had children under the age of 18 living with them, 52.5% were married couples living together, 8.0% had a female householder with no husband present, and 37.6% were non-families. 34.9% of all households were made up of individuals, and 21.6% had someone living alone who was 65 years of age or older. The average household size was 2.22 and the average family size was 2.86.

In the city, the population was spread out, with 21.3% under the age of 18, 7.2% from 18 to 24, 22.8% from 25 to 44, 22.7% from 45 to 64, and 25.9% who were 65 years of age or older. The median age was 44 years. For every 100 females, there were 83.4 males. For every 100 females age 18 and over, there were 78.6 males.

The median income for a household in the city was $29,129, and the median income for a family was $42,000. Males had a median income of $26,989 versus $18,255 for females. The per capita income for the city was $16,628. About 7.9% of families and 12.3% of the population were below the poverty line, including 15.7% of those under age 18 and 10.4% of those age 65 or over.

== Notable people ==
- George E. Abbott, Wyoming politician
- Ryan Carnes, actor
- Charles Russell Davis, US congressman from Minnesota
- Woodbridge N. Ferris, 28th governor of Michigan
- Craig J. Findley, Illinois state representative
- Michael Rea, affectionately known as “Mayor Mike”
- Jamie Gilson, author of children's books
- John Hay, Secretary of State under William McKinley and Theodore Roosevelt
- Russell W. Keeney, US congressman
- Asa C. Matthews, Illinois state representative
- John George Nicolay, diplomat, editor of Pittsfield newspaper
- Terry R. Parke, Illinois state representative
- Timothy D. Rose, actor
- Sid Simpson, US congressman
- Scott Wike, US congressman
- William E. Williams, US congressman

== See also ==
- List of photographs of Abraham Lincoln
