= Big Blue Island =

Island in Pike County, Illinois, United States

Coordinates: 39.661°N 90.625°W

Big Blue Island is an uninhabited fluvial island in the Illinois River. Approximately 1.5 mile (2.4 km) long, it is legally part of Detroit Township and Flint Township within Pike County in the U.S. state of Illinois. The mud island is operated for game management purposes as part of the Ray Norbut State Fish and Wildlife Area, although the larger part of the state hunting area is across the river at Griggsville Landing. The island, located at Mile 58 on the Illinois River, is separated by a narrow side channel from adjacent Scott County.
