= Naples Mound 8 =

Archaeological site in Illinois, United States

- U.S. National Register of Historic Places
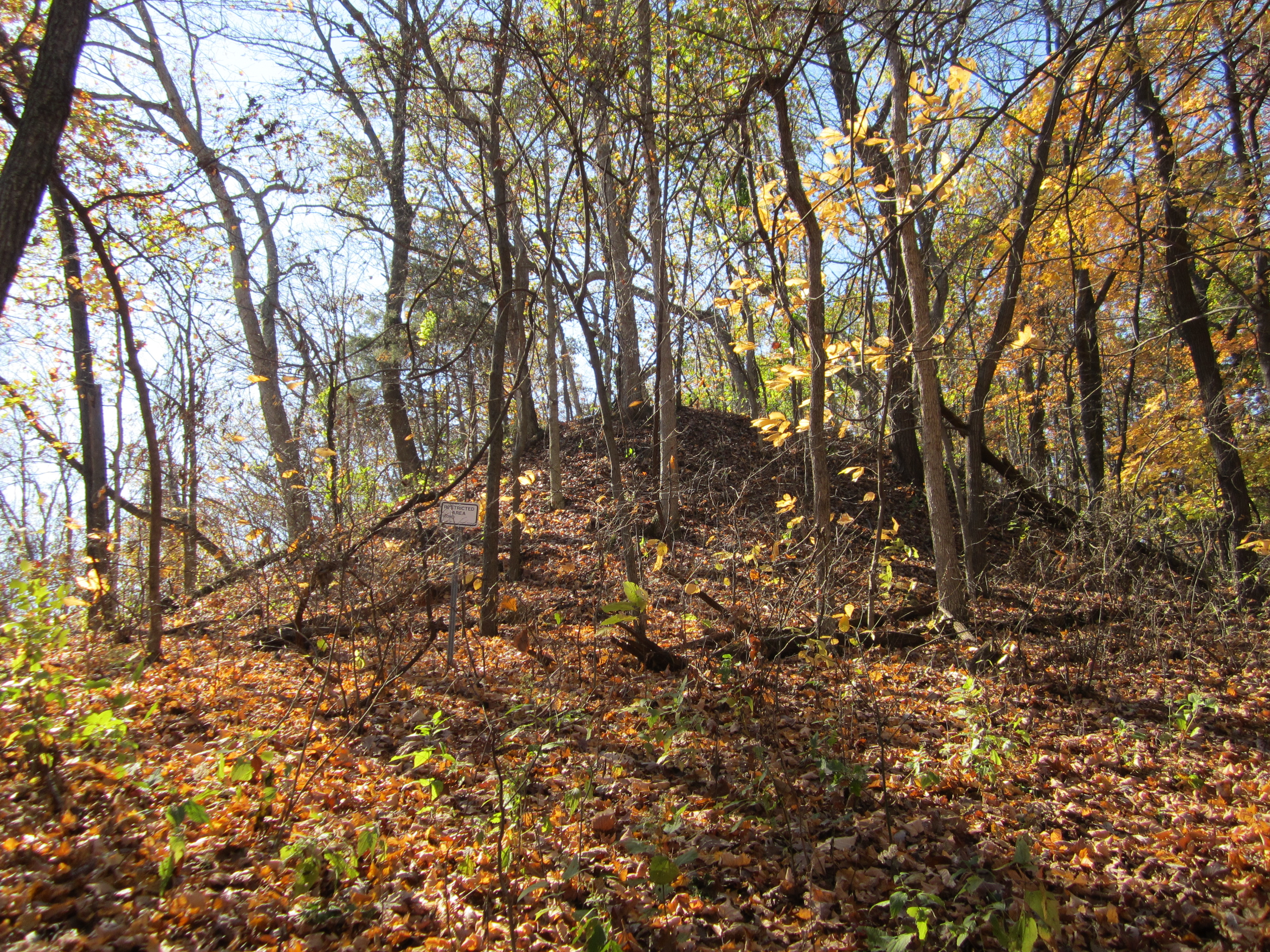

- Location within Illinois
- Location: Pike County, Illinois
- Nearest city: Griggsville
- Coordinates: 39°41′36.9″N 90°38′56″W
- Area: less than one acre
- NRHP reference No.: 75000671
- Added to NRHP: October 14, 1975

The Naples Mound 8 (also Naples-Russel Mound 8 or Illinois Archaeological Survey #PK 335) is a Havana Hopewell culture mound site located in Pike County, Illinois, United States, three miles east of the city of Griggsville. It is the largest mound on the bluff-top in the lower Illinois Valley. The mound was given the name Naples Mound #8 in 1882. The mound was listed on the National Register of Historic Places in 1975.

== First recorded visit by Mormon settlers ==
In May and June 1834, Joseph Smith led a Latter Day Saint group of 150 men known as Zion's Camp on a march from Kirtland, Ohio, to Jackson County, Missouri. On June 3, while passing through west-central Illinois three miles east of Griggsville, Illinois, some men discovered a large burial mound on the west side of the Illinois River one mile south of present-day Valley city. Their report said that there were remains of bones on the surface and that when digging it up they found a skeleton about a foot beneath the surface, with a stone arrow point in the ribs. Wilford Woodruff indicated that they had gone to the top of the mound and then while descending, halfway down the mound, Joseph Smith pointed to a location that was then excavated. Through visions this was interpreted as a white Lamanite warrior named Zelph who was killed during a battle with the Nephites. They took the leg bones of "Zelph" away in Wilford Woodruff's wagon and reburied them near Liberty, Missouri, but the arrow head was retained. The Zelph Mound incident was recorded by six men of Zion's Camp in their journals: Woodruff, Heber C. Kimball, Levi Hancock, George A. Smith, Moses Martin, and Reuben McBride. The "Zelph Mound incident" was formally recorded in church history from available sources in 1842 by church historian, Willard Richards.

== First recorded visits by local settlers ==
Illinois was made a state in 1818 and white settlers came in and opened some of the burial mounds in the former Native American lands. Judge John G. Henderson of Winchester, Illinois, was impressed by beautifully carved stone smoking pipes a friend showed him which were obtained from burial mounds in Naples, Illinois. Accordingly, he and a Mr. Merrill, in 1876, did some excavations and documentation of some of the Naples mounds in which were found a raccoon and a turtle pipe, copper axes, and human skeletal remains. Henderson also mapped the location of fifteen mounds near Naples, including Naples Mound #8. A map he made shows Naples Mound #8 as being a mile south of Valley City, Illinois and across the Illinois River from Naples, Illinois. Being impressed with mound #8, Henderson illustrated an Eagle pipe unearthed from the mound about 40 years earlier by a Daniel Burn, John W. Windsor and others. In describing Naples Mound #8 Henderson states, "On the right bank of the Illinois river about 300 yards below [south of] Griggsville Landing, rises a lofty bluff fully 300 feet above the level of the river. On the summit is a beautiful, oval mound, 150 long, 92 feet wide in the middle, and 25 or 30 feet high. ... within a radius of 5 miles from Naples there are a least fifty mounds, very few of which have ever been opened". After Henderson wrote an article describing the Naples mounds and the relics found in them, the Smithsonian Institution, in December 1879 began a thorough exploration of them, furnishing six laborers to help with the excavations. Afterwards, Henderson authored the article describing the results in the Smithsonian Annual Report.

== Rediscovery of the Mound ==
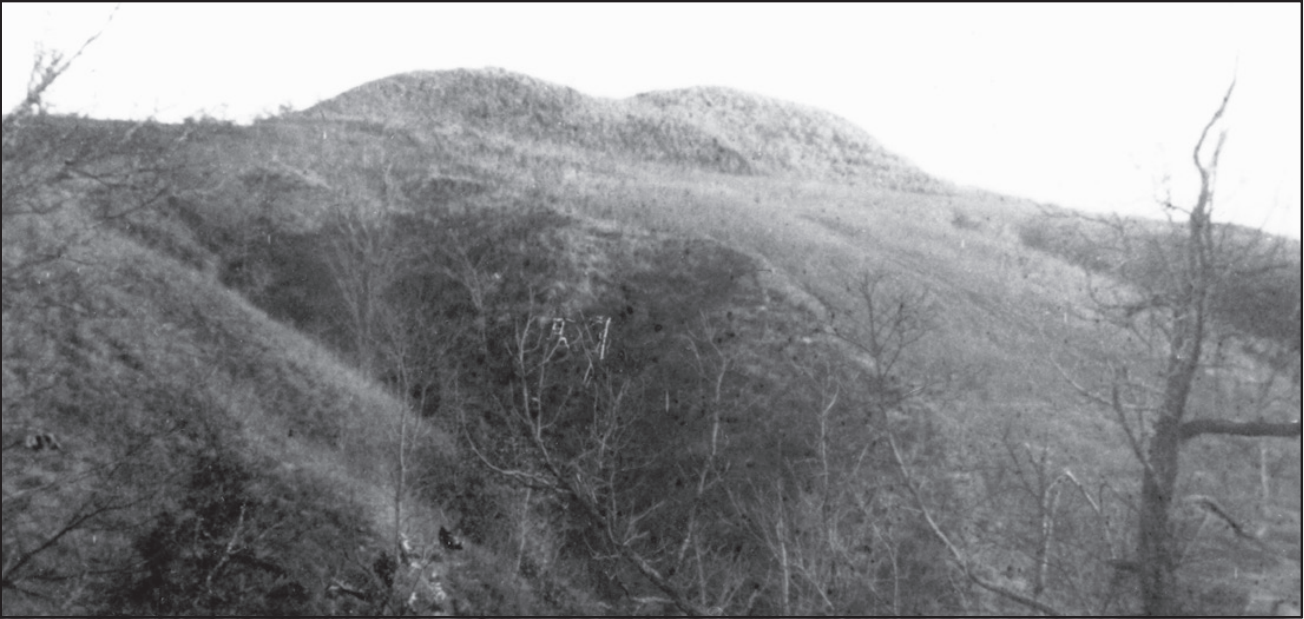
Naples Mound ca 1880

The mound was forgotten after 1882 and no records of visits have been found until 1974. Due to the Central Illinois Expressway bridge being planned across the Illinois River, the river bluffs were again visited by archaeologists. A team of graduate students from Northwestern University led by Archaeology Professor Jane E. Buikstra combed the bluffs of the Illinois River a mile South of Valley City, Illinois mapping burial mounds. They located an extraordinarily large mound and were excited to inform local historian, Warren Winston, about it. James Bradley, a Mormon Historian from Utah, who had been searching for Zelph Mound for 25 years, visited Warren Winston the day after Professor Buikstra's visit and the connection was made. The Zelph Mound was re-identified using historic journals, historic landmarks and mound surveys. The archaeological name Naples Mound #8, which archaeologist Henderson had given it over ninety years earlier, was changed by Professor Buikstra in 1974 to Naples-Russell Mound #8 (RN8). The name "Russell" was added due to the mound being on private land owned by a Mr. Roy Russell. Shortly after that event, in 1975, Buikstra applied to have the mound placed on the National Register of Historic Places. Seven years later, in 1988, The State of Illinois purchased 280 acres of Illinois River frontage land, including the mound.

== Scientific investigation of the Mound ==
In 2001, the mound underwent an archeological investigation. What was identified as Burial 1 Skeleton 1 (QL-4904) was interred on the top of the upper west side of the tumulus, and was one of the last burials in the mound. QL-4904 was thus determined to be the end use of the structure. By radiometric dating it was determined that QL-4904 was interred in 91 AD (Calibrated Range (2σ) AD 58–127). The mound in question is now known as Naples-Russell Mound 8, and is part of the Napoleon Hollow Archeological District which consists of twenty-six burial mounds and two possible burial knolls known collectively as the Russell Mound Group. Occupation and burials in the Napoleon Hollow Archeological District existed from 50 BC to 100 AD as determined by extensive radiometric dating. During the 2001 excavation two areas about halfway down the hill were noted as having looter disturbance, either location consistent with the 1834 Latter Day Saint excavation. No intrusive burials (burials after completion of the mound) were observed by archeologists investigating the mound.

Previously archaeologists, after excavating in the Elizabeth Mounds and Napoleon Hollow for ten years where an expressway bridge was to be built, excavated the mound, located just a hundred and fifty yards to the north of the Elizabeth Mound group. A scientific excavation of RN8 was carried out in 1990 by The University of Illinois at Urbana-Champaign, in cooperation with the Center for American Archaeology at Kampsville, Illinois. The dig was funded by the Illinois Department of Transportation and supervised by archaeologist Ken Farnsworth. The artifacts found during the excavation confirmed the mound to be a Hopewell burial mound, with estimated dating from 100 B.C. to 250 A.D. Further investigations published in 2019 determined that the occupation in the area commenced in 50 B.C. and ended in 100 A.D. The artifacts are now located in the Illinois State Museum. The artifacts of the RN8 Mound were found to be from many parts of the eastern two thirds of United States or east of the Rocky Mountains, illustrating the wide trade network of the Hopewell culture. Photographs of the artifacts from NR8 have recently been published. The mound is located at the Ray Norbut Fish and Wildlife Area, overseen by the Illinois Department of Natural Resources.

== See also ==
- List of archaeological sites on the National Register of Historic Places in Illinois
