= Griggsville Landing, Illinois =

Griggsville Landing
- Ghost town
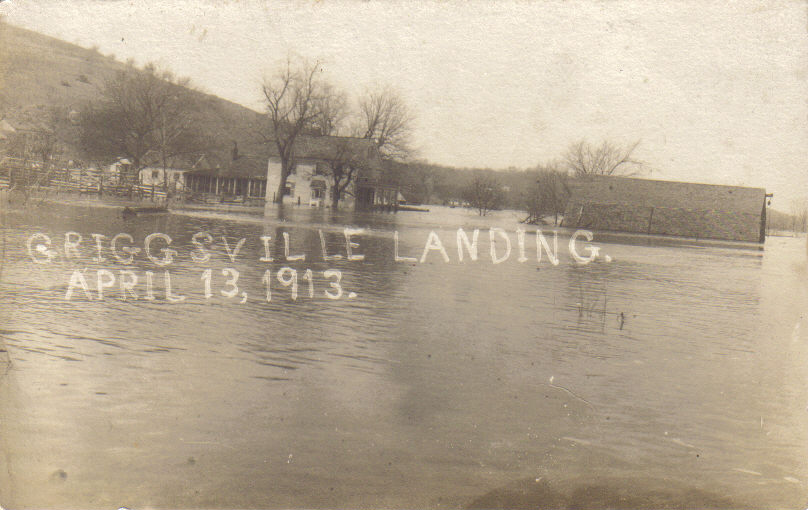
- Griggsville Landing, 1913
- Nicknames: Phillips' Ferry; Phillipsburg; Phillips Landing; Parkers Landing
- Location within Illinois
- Coordinates: 39°41′49″N 90°38′51″W
- Country: United States
- State: Illinois
- County: Pike County

Griggsville Landing, also known as Phillips Landing or Phillips Ferry, was located in Flint Township, just south of Valley City, Illinois. It is a former town site on the Illinois River in Pike County. The town was a steamboat stop which began sometime in the 1830s. There was a lime kiln there that was part of a commercial lime operation prior to post-Civil War industrial intensification in the lime industry. The town at Griggsville Landing was home to a boat yard, a grist mill and a hotel in addition to the Griggsville Landing Lime Kiln, built around 1850, which is still standing as of 2007. The town was eventually abandoned, rendering it a ghost town. Griggsville Landing is adjacent to the Ray Norbut State Fish and Wildlife Area.

== History ==
=== Early history ===
Pike County, Illinois was surveyed by the United States government in 1817–1819.^{:43}

The site became known as Phillipsburg, then Griggsville Landing, then the landing for Valley City; in 1906, the book Past and Present of Pike County, Illinois, giving this sequence of names, notes that "Valley City is the only town in the township and is on the Wabash Railroad."^{:80} The same book refers to "Phillips' ferry, the present site of Valley City."^{:168} In a 1912 county atlas, the name had changed again to Parkers Landing.

== Industry ==
There was a lime kiln there that was part of a commercial lime operation prior to post-Civil War industrial intensification in the lime industry. The town at Griggsville Landing was home to a boat yard, a grist mill and a hotel in addition to the Griggsville Landing Lime Kiln, built around 1850, which is still standing as of 2007.

=== Boats ===
==== Ferry ====
In 1822, Garrett Van Dusen, the second settler in Flint Township,^{:80} started a ferry using a canoe, ferrying footmen and swimming horses.^{:56} Judge William Thomas of Jacksonville, in an 1873 letter, recalled crossing the river here in September 1827:

Passing Colonel Seeley's, I found no other house until I reached Blue river, where Van Deusen had a small grist mill, and I crossed the Illinois river on Van Deusen's ferry. That night I reached Exeter.

— ^{:117}

Van Deusen later sold the ferry and land claim to Nimrod Phillips.^{:56} By 1832, the site was referred to as Phillips' Ferry.^{:53} It was used by Hyrum Smith and his family during the Mormon migration to Missouri. According to Juliet Walker writing for the Illinois Historical Journal, "Until the railroads, the Phillips Ferry Road, as it was commonly called, would remain the most traveled east-west route in the county."

At Valley City, William Windsor (March 4, 1822 – March 12, 1885) ran a horse-powered ferry, and later a steam ferry.^{:483}

==== Steamboats ====
The town was a steamboat stop which began sometime in the 1830s. It continued as a steamboat stop until the 1930s.

In 1844, Captain Samuel Rider constructed a boat called Olitippa at Griggsville Landing. The boat was powered by horses and designed to carry freight across low water levels. Rider constructed two steamboats at Griggsville Landing, Timolian and Prairie State.

=== Decline ===
==== Levees ====
The town was eventually abandoned, rendering it a ghost town due in part because, by Congressional mandate, the United States Army Corps of Engineers constructed levees along the Illinois River leading to flooding of lower elevation settlements along the river. The annual floods as a result of the levees wreaked havoc on Valley City leading to decimation of the town's businesses, abandonment of homes, and the eventual death of the town.

Prior to the levees, Valley City was a vibrant river town with an economy based on commercial fishing, transportation of agricultural products such as hogs packed in oak barrels, apples, and cattle to markets in St. Louis and New Orleans, and a host of small businesses including an ice house that harvested ice from the Illinois River each winter packing it in sawdust and delivering ice to residents of Griggsville some four miles west.

==== Railroads ====
When rail service expanded into Pike County in the 1860s and 1870s, reliance on river landings for trade decreased. By 1870, only four steamboats made regular trips between Peoria and St. Louis.

In 1877, Valley City was platted a half-mile north of Griggsville Landing where the railroad crossed the Illinois River. With its proximity to the railroad, Valley City soon displaced Griggsville Landing as an important economic and trade location.

==== Other factors ====
Sometime in the late 1990s, the last major plant in Valley City, the Tate Cheese Company, closed its doors for good. After Tate Cheese Company abandoned the processing plant in Valley City there was less interest in the remaining buildings adjacent to the plant. People began to permanently abandon their homes after the Great Flood of 1993 that devastated many homes across the Midwest.

== Geography ==
Griggsville Landing was located at 39°41′49″N 90°38′51″W.
