= Detroit, Illinois =

- Village
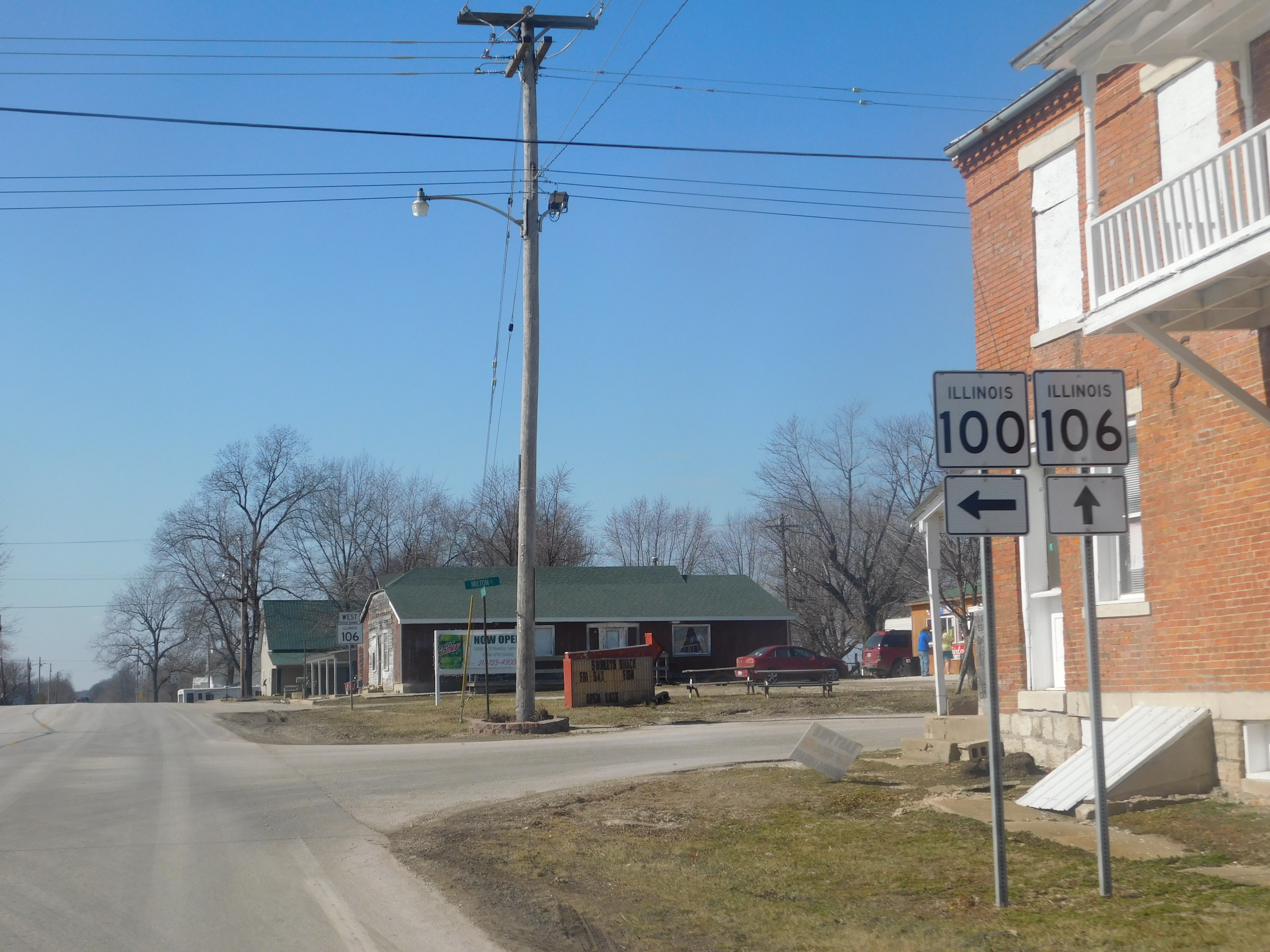
- The junction of IL 100 and IL 106 in Detroit.

- Location of Detroit in Pike County, Illinois.
- Coordinates: 39°37′13″N 90°40′33″W
- Country: United States
- State: Illinois
- County: Pike
- Township: Detroit
- Platted: 1837
- Named for: Detroit, Michigan

Area
  - Total: 0.25 sq mi (0.65 km^{2})
  - Land: 0.25 sq mi (0.65 km^{2})
  - Water: 0 sq mi (0.00 km^{2})
- Elevation: 640 ft (200 m)

Population (2020)
  - Total: 76
  - Density: 303.2/sq mi (117.05/km^{2})
- Time zone: UTC-6 (CST)
  - Summer (DST): UTC-5 (CDT)
- ZIP code: 62363
- Area code: 217
- FIPS code: 17-19681
- GNIS feature ID: 2398717

Detroit, Illinois is a village in Detroit Township, Pike County, Illinois, United States. The population was 76 at the 2020 census, a decline from 83 in 2010.

== History ==
Detroit was laid out in 1837, taking its name after Detroit, Michigan. A post office was established at Detroit in 1845, and remained in operation until the 1970s.

== Geography ==
According to the 2010 census, Detroit has a total area of 0.24 square miles (0.62 km^{2}), all land.

== Demographics ==
Historical population
Census	Pop.	Note	%±
1870	160		—
1880	168		5.0%
1890	161		−4.2%
1900	149		−7.5%
1910	127		−14.8%
1920	129		1.6%
1930	144		11.6%
1940	140		−2.8%
1950	126		−10.0%
1960	126		0.0%
1970	124		−1.6%
1980	156		25.8%
1990	126		−19.2%
2000	93		−26.2%
2010	83		−10.8%
2020	76		−8.4%
U.S. Decennial Census

As of the 2000 census, there were 93 people, 37 households, and 21 families residing in the village. The population density was 388.7 inhabitants per square mile (150.1/km^{2}). There were 46 housing units at an average density of 192.3 per square mile (74.2/km^{2}). The racial makeup of the village was 98.92% White, and 1.08% from two or more races. Hispanic or Latino of any race were 6.45% of the population.

Of a total 37 households, 27.0% included children under the age of 18, 56.8% were married couples living together, and 43.2% were non-families. 35.1% of all households were made up of individuals, and 16.2% had someone living alone who was 65 years of age or older. The average household size was 2.51 and the average family size was 3.43.

In the village, the population was spread out, with 31.2% under the age of 18, 4.3% from 18 to 24, 31.2% from 25 to 44, 25.8% from 45 to 64, and 7.5% who were 65 years of age or older. The median age was 32 years. For every 100 females, there were 97.9 males. For every 100 females age 18 and over, there were 93.9 males.

The median income for a household in the village was $21,875, and the median income for a family was $35,000. Males had a median income of $34,063 versus $19,375 for females. The per capita income for the village was $11,127. There were 15.4% of families and 13.1% of the population living below the poverty line, including 8.6% of under eighteens and none of those over 64.
