= Zelph =

Lamanite chieftain-warrior

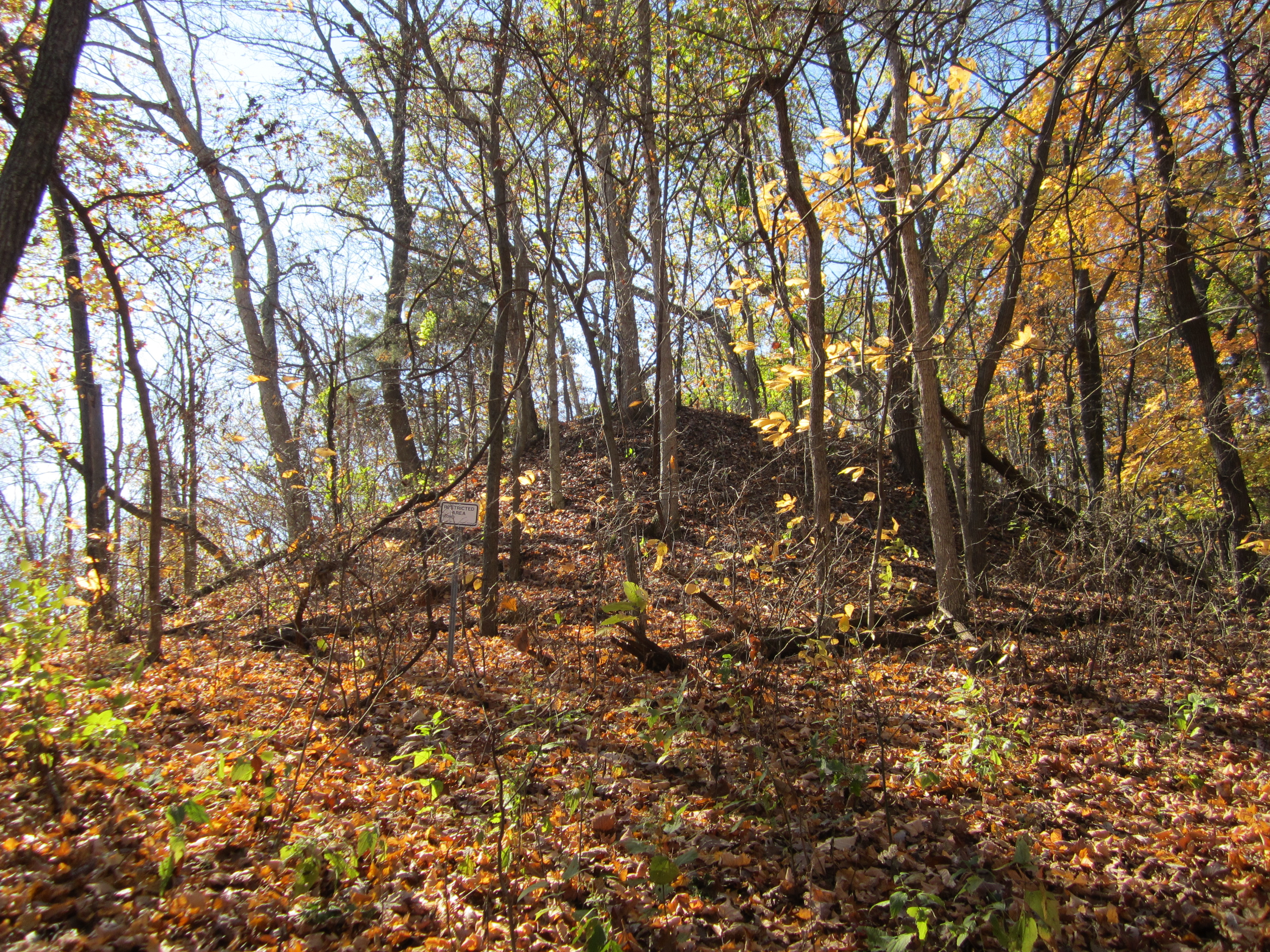
Naples-Russel Mound 8, where the bones identified as Zelph were unearthed.

Zelph (/zɛlf/) is a figure of interest in Mormon studies. In May and June 1834 Joseph Smith led an expedition known as Zion's Camp (a paramilitary Latter Day Saint group) on a march from Kirtland, Ohio to Jackson County, Missouri. On June 3, while passing through west-central Illinois near Griggsville, some bones were unearthed from a mound. These bones were identified by Smith as belonging to a Lamanite chieftain-warrior named Zelph. The mound in question is now known as Naples-Russell Mound 8, and is part of the Napoleon Hollow Archeological District, which consists of twenty-six burial mounds and two possible burial knolls known collectively as the Russell Mound Group. Occupation and burials in the Napoleon Hollow Archeological District existed from 50 BC to 100 AD as determined by extensive radiometric dating.

== Background ==
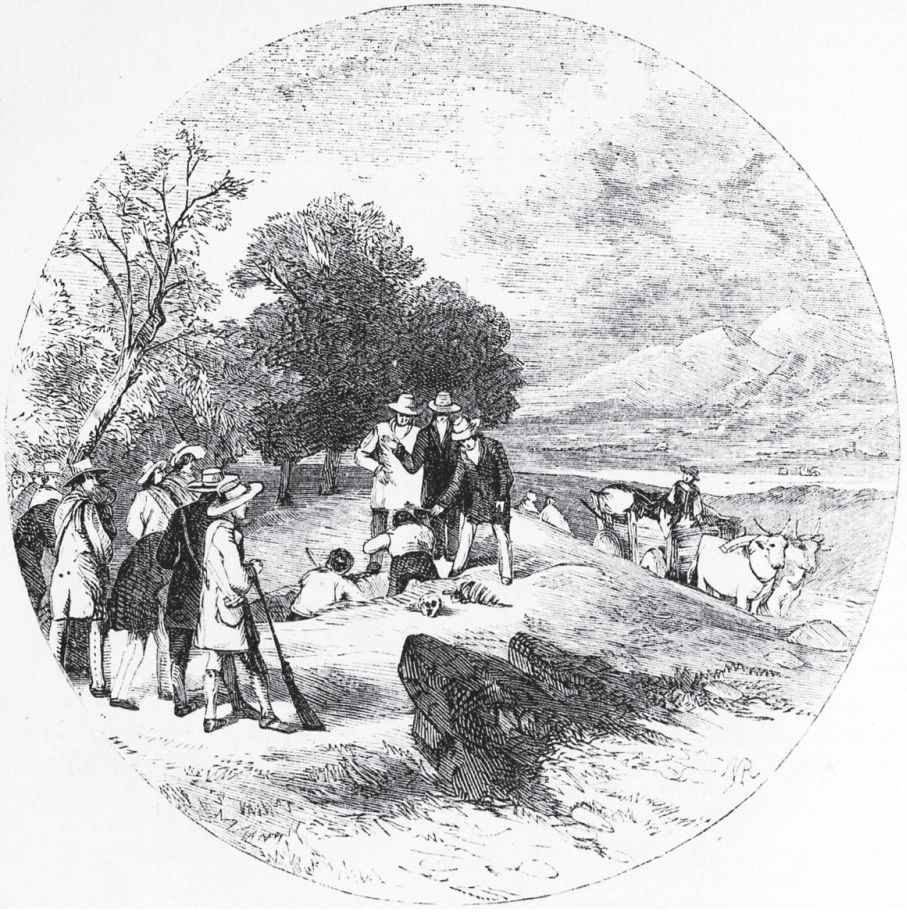
An 1853 artistic representation of the excavation of Zelph in Harper's Weekly

In 1834, Joseph Smith said he received a revelation from God, calling for a militia to be raised in Kirtland which would then march to Missouri and "redeem Zion." About 200 men and a number of women and children volunteered to join this militia, which became known as "Zion's Camp." On June 3, 1834, in Pike County, Illinois, some of the men of Zion's Camp located some bones and an arrowhead about a foot below the ground. Smith himself wrote nothing about the event; however, seven of the members of Zion's Camp who were with him either recorded or orally related their accounts of what was said. These accounts declared that the bones were from Zelph, a "white Lamanite" general who was a righteous man.

A reference to this event is made in E.D. Howe's 1834 book Mormonism Unvailed, which states:

A large mound was one day discovered, upon which Gen. Smith ordered an excavation to be made into it; and about one foot from the top of the ground, the bones of a human skeleton were found, which were carefully laid out upon a board, when Smith made a speech, prophesying or declaring that they were the remains of a celebrated General among the Nephites, mentioning his name and the battle in which he was slain, some 1500 years ago.

Contrary to Howe's statement that the group found the remains of a "General among the Nephites," all of the recorded accounts agree that Zelph was identified as a Lamanite.

== Accounts ==
Although he was not a witness to the event, John Taylor, publisher of the Times and Seasons, had been writing History of Joseph Smith and included in the January 1, 1846 issue, the following account:

On the top of the mound were stones which presented the appearance of three alters [sic] having been erected one above the other, according to ancient order; and human bones were strewn over the surface of the ground. The brethren procured a shovel and hoe, and removing the earth to the depth of about one foot discovered skeleton of a man, almost entire, and between his ribs was a Lamanitish arrow which evidently produced his death, Elder Brigham Young retained the arrow and the brethren carried some pieces of the skeleton to Clay county. The contemplation of the scenery before us produced peculiar sensations in our bosoms; and the visions of the past being opened to my understandings by the sprit of the Almighty I discovered that the person whose skeleton was before us, was a white Lamanite, a large thick set man, and a man of God. He was a warrior and chieftain under the great prophet Omandagus, who was known from the hill Cumorah, or Eastern sea, to the Rocky Mountains. His name was Zelph. The curse was taken from him, or at least in part; one of his thigh bones was broken, by a stone flung from a sling while in battle years before his death. He was killed in battle, by the arrow found among his ribs, during the last great struggle of the Lammanites and Nephites.

— John Taylor

Actual witnesses to the event (McBride, Martin, Woodruff, and Hancock) of which John Taylor was not one, who recorded their observations in 1834 concurrent with the event, make no mention of Zelph's death being related to any struggle or battle of the Nephites or Lamanites. Godfrey (1989) notes that in 1842, the primary source for the History of the Church which is entitled the "Manuscript History of the Church, Book A-1" specifically crosses out the reference to the "hill Cumorah" and the "last" and "and Nephites" pertaining to the "great struggle.'

Heber C. Kimball in a later recollection written in 1843 and published in 1845, indicated that several of the group, along with Joseph Smith, walked to the top of a mound that they had located on the bank of the Illinois River. Kimball states, "On the top of this mound there was the appearance of three altars, which had been built of stone, one above another, according to the ancient order; and the ground was strewn over with human bones." Wilford Woodruff indicated that they had gone to the top of the mound and then while descending, halfway down the mound, Joseph Smith pointed to a location that was then excavated. During a 2001 archeological excavation of the mound, two areas about halfway down the hill were noted as having looter disturbance, either location consistent with the 1834 description of the digging. After Joseph Smith had identified the location, Kimball and the others then dug into the side of the mound, having previously sent for a shovel and a hoe. Kimball describes what was discovered:

At about one foot deep we discovered the skeleton of a man, almost entire; and between two of his ribs we found an Indian arrow, which had evidently been the cause of his death. We took the leg and thigh bones and carried them along with us to Clay county. All four appeared sound.

— Heber C. Kimball

Nothing more is contained in Kimball's account regarding the altars.

After continuing on their journey, Kimball reports that it "was made known to Joseph that he had been an officer who fell in battle, in the last destruction among the Lamanites, and his name was Zelph. This caused us to rejoice much, to think that God was so mindful of us as to show these things to his servant. Brother Joseph had enquired of the Lord and it was made known in a vision."

Reuben McBride's journal account states, "His name was Zelph a war[r]ior under the Prophet Onandagus Zelph a white Laman[i]te." McBride also wrote that "an arrow was found in his Ribs ... which he said he sup[p]osed oc[c]aisoned his death." McBride wrote that Zelph "was known from the atlantic to the Rocky Mountains." Moses Martin stated, "Soon afterward, Joseph had a vision and the Lord shewed him that this man was once a mighty Prophet and many other things concerning his death in which he had fal[l]en no doubt in some great bat[t]le." Martin also described the skeleton "to be eight or nine feet tall because of the size of the thigh bone." Levi Hancock's journal also refers to "Onendagus," stating that "Zelf he was a white Lamanite who fought with the people of Onendagus for freedom." Onondaga is the name of a county in New York state as well as the name of the Onondaga people, a tribe of the Iroquois Confederacy that once occupied the area. Wilford Woodruff's journal mentions that the bones were "probably" from the Lamanites and Nephites, even though the printed vision omitted the "probably."

== Zelph and the question of Book of Mormon geography ==
The accounts related to Zelph are used as evidence by some Book of Mormon scholars to suggest that the Lehites inhabited the entire North American continent as proposed by the Hemispheric Geographical Model, rather than merely portions of Central America as suggested by the Limited Geography Model. (See also Archaeology and the Book of Mormon)

Although Smith did not mention the Zelph event specifically in his journal, it is clear that during this period he considered the area in which the group was traveling to have been part of the land described in the Book of Mormon. In a letter that Smith wrote to his wife Emma the following day (June 4, 1834), he stated:

The whole of our journey, in the midst of so large a company of social honest and sincere men, wandering over the plains of the Nephites, recounting occasionally the history of the Book of Mormon, roving over the mounds of that once beloved people of the Lord, picking up their skulls & their bones, as a proof of its divine authenticity, and gazing upon a country the fertility, the splendour and the goodness so indescribable, all serves to pass away time unnoticed.

Smith's thinking regarding the location of Book of Mormon events may have evolved over time. In the 1842 periodical Times and Seasons, which names Joseph Smith as publisher, stories about the discovery of ancient Maya ruins on the Yucatán Peninsula offered evidence to the Book of Mormon's authenticity. Zelph is not an individual mentioned in the Book of Mormon narrative and would therefore not necessarily be associated with any of the events presumed by some people, including many apologists associated with the Foundation for Ancient Research and Mormon Studies (FARMS), to have occurred in Mesoamerica. The implication of belief in a hemispheric Book of Mormon geography by these men is supported by several references made by Wilford Woodruff. Woodruff writes that he "visited many of the mounds which were flung up by the ancient inhabitants of this continent probably by the Nephites & Lamanites." Woodruff also states that Zelph "that was known from the hill Cumorah or East sea to the Rocky mountains," thus implying that the hill Cumorah in New York is the same hill Cumorah referred to in the Book of Mormon. Some LDS scholars believe that "hill Cumorah" was Woodruff's term rather than Joseph Smith's, since other accounts refer only to the sea and fail to mention either Nephites or the hill Cumorah.

During the 2001 archeological investigation, a skeleton discovered as Burial 1 Skeleton 1 (QL-4904) was found interred on the top of the upper west side of the tumulus, and was one of the last burials in the mound. QL-4904 was thus determined to be the end use of the structure. No intrusive burials (burials after completion of the mound) were observed by archeologists investigating the mound. By radiometric dating it was determined that QL-4904 was interred in 91 AD (Calibrated Range (2σ) AD 58–127). The Naples-Russell Mound 8 is part of the Napoleon Hollow Archeological District, which consists of twenty-six burial mounds and two possible burial knolls known collectively as the Russell Mound Group. Occupation and burials in the Napoleon Hollow Archeological District existed from 50 BC to 100 AD as determined by extensive radiometric dating. Thus, the Zelph skeleton, which was located further down the hill indicative of an earlier time frame, could not be a candidate to be involved in any final battle of the Nephites and Lamanites, which occurred much later (late 4th century AD).

In 1842 Willard Richards compiled a number of records in order to produce a history of the church. Among the records examined were the various accounts related to Zelph. In the process of combining the accounts, Richards crossed out Woodruff's references to "hill Cumorah," and Heber C. Kimball's reference to the "last" great struggle with the Lamanites."
