= Flint Township =

Flint Township may refer to:

- Flint Township, Pike County, Illinois
- Flint Township, Michigan
- Flint Township, Stutsman County, North Dakota, in Stutsman County, North Dakota
