= Detroit Township =

Detroit Township may refer to the following townships in the United States:

- Detroit Township, Pike County, Illinois
- Detroit Township, Becker County, Minnesota
