= Valley City, Illinois =

Valley City
- Village
- Location of Valley City in Pike County, Illinois.
- Coordinates: 39°42′24″N 90°39′03″W
- Country: United States
- State: Illinois
- County: Pike

Area
  - Total: 0.32 sq mi (0.83 km^{2})
  - Land: 0.27 sq mi (0.70 km^{2})
  - Water: 0.054 sq mi (0.14 km^{2})
- Elevation: 433 ft (132 m)

Population
  - Total: 13
  - Density: 51.9/sq mi (20.05/km^{2})
- Time zone: UTC-6 (CST)
  - Summer (DST): UTC-5 (CDT)
- ZIP code: 62340
- Area code: 217
- FIPS code: 17-77187
- GNIS feature ID: 2400038

Valley City is a village in Pike County, Illinois, United States. The population was 14 at the 2020 census, making Valley City the smallest incorporated place in Illinois in terms of population. As of 2024, the population was 13. In late December 2015 and early January 2016 the village flooded, leaving many roads underwater.

== Geography ==
According to the 2010 census, Valley City has a total area of 0.212 square miles (0.55 km^{2}), of which 0.2 square miles (0.52 km^{2}) (or 94.34%) is land and 0.012 square miles (0.03 km^{2}) (or 5.66%) is water.

== Demographics ==
Historical population
Census	Pop.	Note	%±
1880	60		—
1960	109		—
1970	66		−39.4%
1980	60		−9.1%
1990	23		−61.7%
2000	14		−39.1%
2010	13		−7.1%
2020	14		7.7%
U.S. Decennial Census

At the 2000 census there were 14 people, 4 households, and 3 families in the village. The population density was 71.5 inhabitants per square mile (27.6/km^{2}). There were 7 housing units at an average density of 35.7 per square mile (13.8/km^{2}). The racial makeup of the village was 100.00% White. Of the 4 households 25.0% had children under the age of 18 living with them, 75.0% were married couples living together, and 25.0% were non-families. 25.0% of households were one person and 25.0% were one person aged 65 or older. The average household size was 3.50 and the average family size was 4.00.

The age distribution was 14.3% under the age of 18, 35.7% from 18 to 24, 21.4% from 25 to 44, 21.4% from 45 to 64, and 7.1% 65 or older. The median age was 32 years. For every 100 females, there were 75.0 males. For every 100 females age 18 and over, there were 71.4 males.

The median household income was $41,250 and the median family income was $41,250. Males had a median income of $36,250 versus $0 for females. The per capita income for the village was $6,833. None of the population and none of the families were below the poverty line.

== See also ==
- Griggsville Landing, Illinois
- Griggsville Landing Lime Kiln
