= Griggsville Historic District =

Historic district in Illinois, United States

- U.S. National Register of Historic Places
- U.S. Historic district
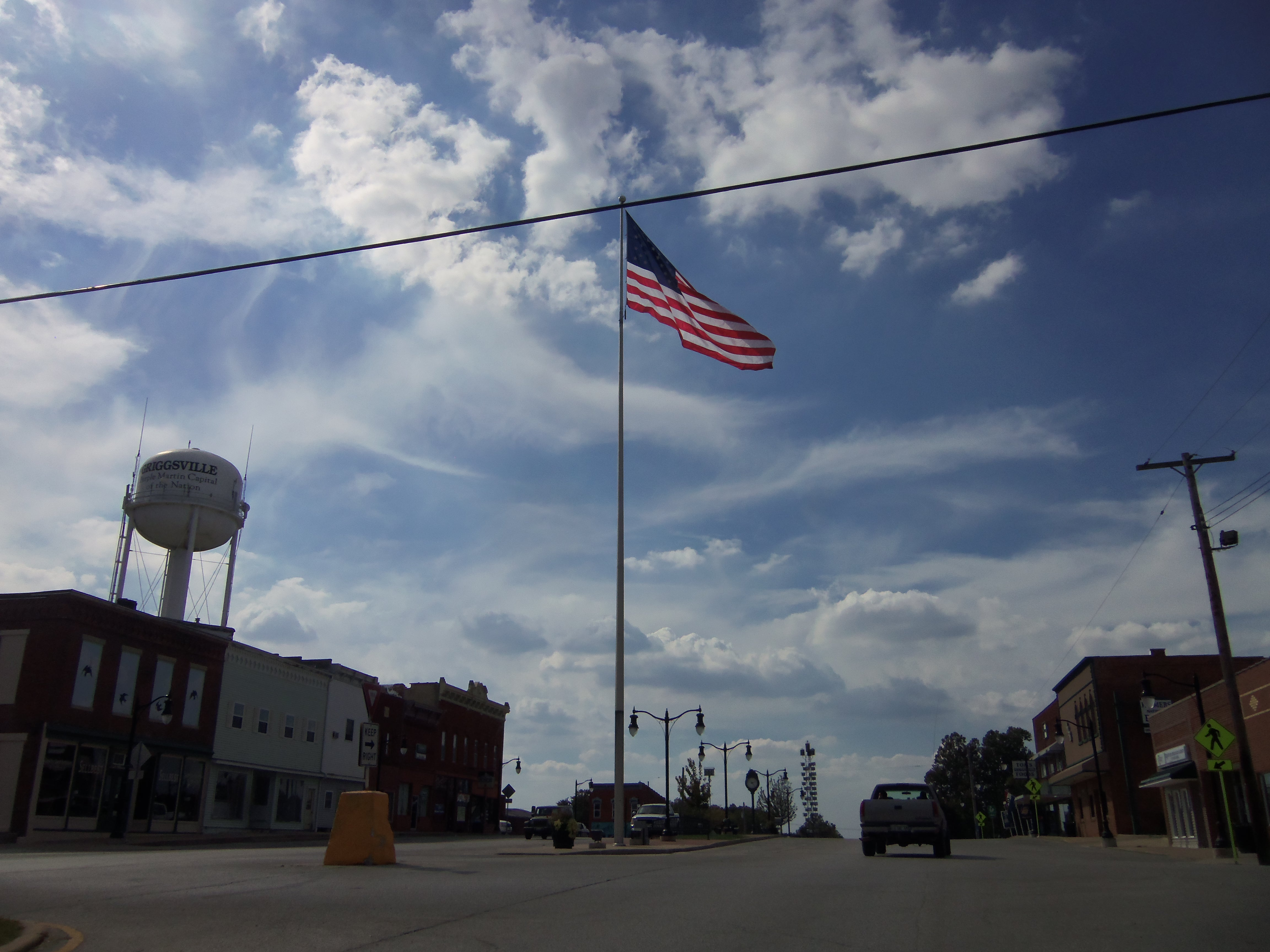

- Location within Illinois Location within the United States
- Location: Irregular pattern along Corey, Stanford, Quincy and Liberty Sts., Griggsville, Illinois
- Coordinates: 39°42′30″N 90°43′33″W
- Area: 100 acres (40 ha)
- Built: 1834
- Architectural style: Greek Revival, Italianate, Queen Anne
- NRHP reference No.: 79000863
- Added to NRHP: January 17, 1979

Griggsville Historic District is a historic district comprising the oldest sections of the city of Griggsville, Pike County, Illinois. The district encompasses Griggsville's commercial center and two of its residential areas. Development began in the commercial center in the 1830s; however, most of its significant buildings were built between 1850 and 1880. These buildings are mainly two-story brick structures, and several have Italianate influences. The southern residential area also has a heavy Italianate influence, as most of the homes there are designed in the style. The northwest residential area includes a variety of architectural styles and has a more rural character.

The district was listed on the National Register of Historic Places on January 17, 1979.
