= Buffalo Grove Lime Kiln =

- U.S. National Register of Historic Places
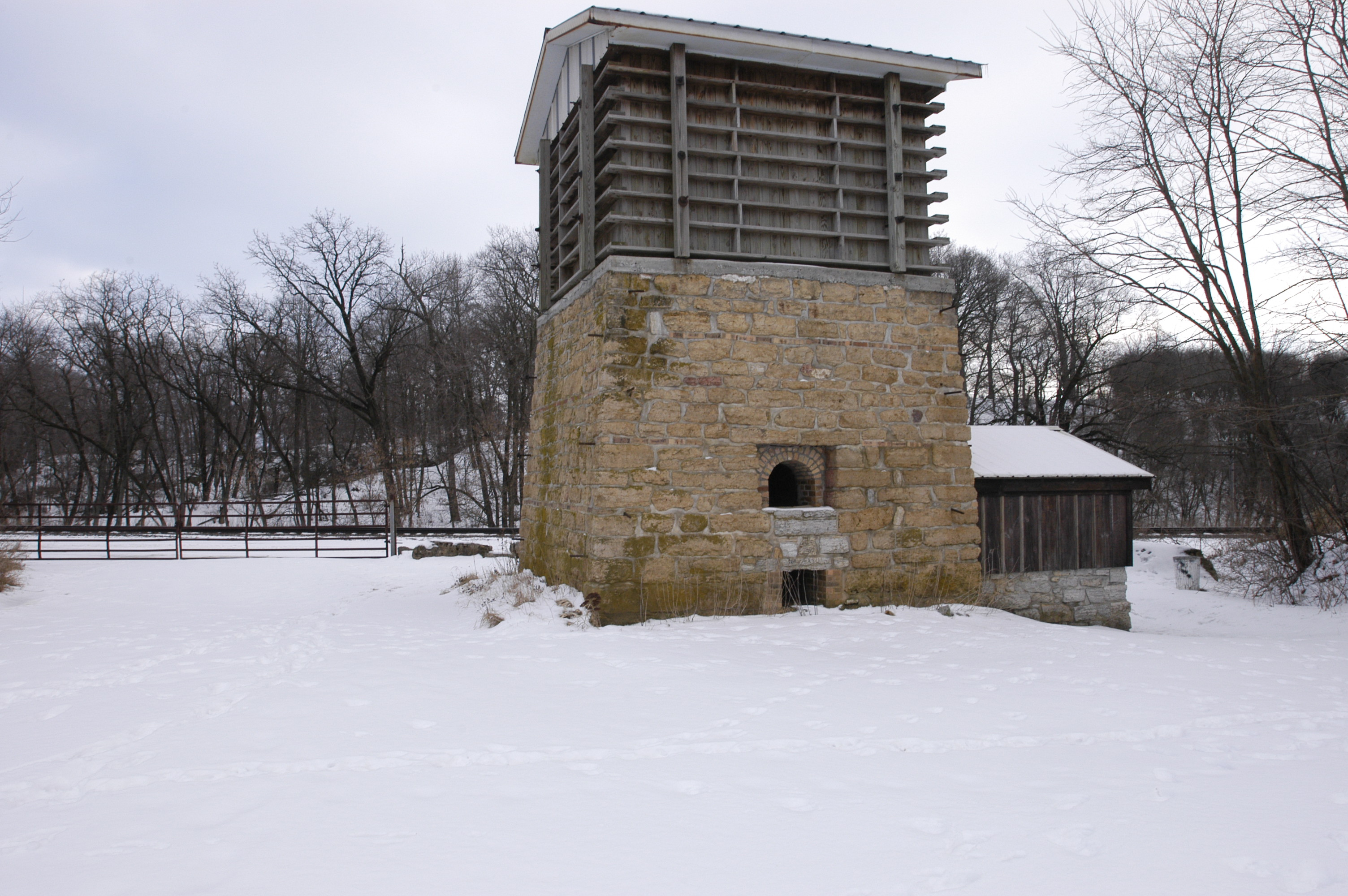
- The stone Buffalo Grove Lime Kiln is one of the best preserved perpetual lime kilns in Illinois.

- Location within Illinois Location within the United States
- Location: Galena Trail Rd., Polo, Illinois
- Coordinates: 41°59′13″N 89°34′38″W
- Area: 3 acres (1.2 ha)
- Built: 1870
- NRHP reference No.: 02001348
- Added to NRHP: November 20, 2002

Buffalo Grove Lime Kiln is one of two old lime kilns in Illinois listed on the National Register of Historic Places. The other is the Griggsville Landing Lime Kiln in Pike County. Buffalo Grove Lime Kiln is located near the Ogle County city of Polo. When in use, the kiln would have produced raw quicklime. The lime kiln was added to the National Register in 2002.

== Location ==
The Buffalo Grove Lime Kiln is found outside of the city of Polo, off Galena Trail Road. The kiln sits on the floor of a limestone quarry, a little over 1,400 feet (430 m) from the road. Railroad tracks pass by within ten feet to the kiln's south and Buffalo Creek is just over the railroad tracks. The quarry's limestone bluffs are set off to the north, behind the kiln.

== Characteristics ==
=== Kiln ===
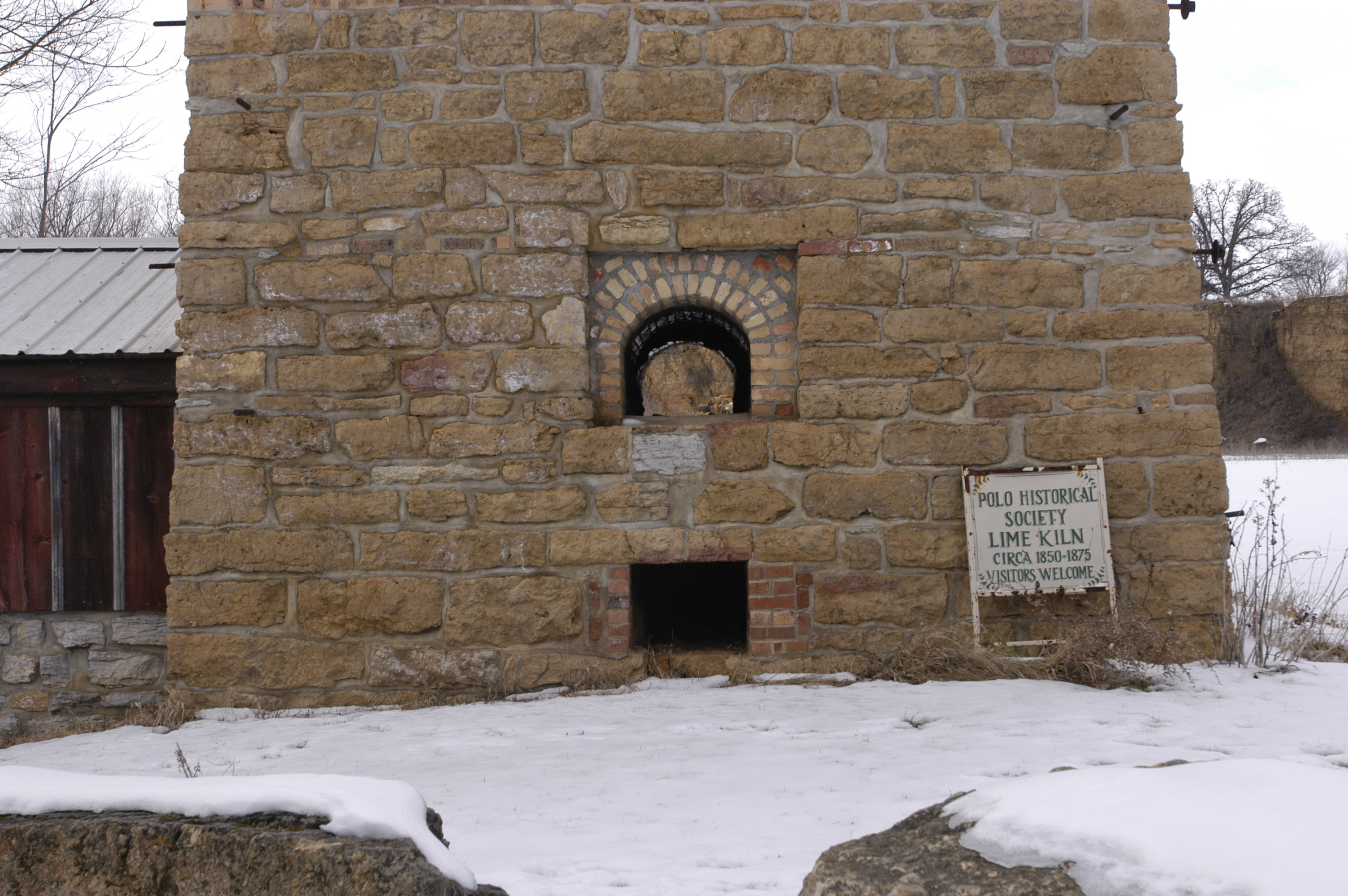
The limestone base of the perpetual lime kiln near Polo, Illinois.

The fire boxes are found outside the interior vertical column, which climbs 25 feet (7.6 m) into the air. The kiln was constructed of native limestone, quarried on its location in 1870, according to news articles of the day. It is a wood-burning perpetual kiln, or draw-down kiln, which means it must be continuously fired. Between the kiln's outer limestone rock wall and the interior fire brick vertical column is a layer of dirt for insulation. The 16-foot (4.9 m) tall stone base is topped with a wooden structure, which was rebuilt from the original in 1992. On top of that is a metal gabled roof. Attached to the kiln section, is a dry shed/lime house, into which the draw section open. The dry shed was long gone when the kiln was restored in 1992 and had to be replaced along with the deteriorated original wood sections topping the base.

=== Dimensions ===
Inside the kiln the fire brick column extends 25 feet (7.6 m) into the air and has an interior diameter of six feet. Below, at the kiln's base, is a four-foot section for cooling, below that are the draw outs. The handcut stone base is 16 feet (4.9 m) square by 16 feet (4.9 m) high. The dry shed is nine feet high by 12 feet (3.7 m) wide and sits on a six-foot stone base.

== History ==
After sitting idle for decades the Buffalo Grove Lime Kiln was acquired by the Polo Historical Society in 1985. They began clearing trees, brush and debris around the kiln. A restoration project began in 1992 at a cost of $10,000. The lime kiln at Buffalo Grove has had a long history that dates back even further than the lime kiln that stands on the site today.

=== Restoration ===
In 1992 a restoration project began under the guidance of the Polo Historical Society and member Paul Graehling. The old, loose mortar had to be removed from around the stones and replaced. The replacement was a fifty percent mortar fifty percent cement mix, to preserve the restoration. The wooden upper portion of the kiln had deteriorated completely beyond repair and had to be entirely replaced. The top portion was constructed in sections off-site and then lifted into place using a crane. The whole structure was then topped with an aluminum roof to protect it from future deterioration. The attachment of the roof rendered the kiln inoperable, although, if it were removed the Buffalo Grove Lime Kiln would be fully functional and ready for lime production.

The lime house, attached to the kiln, was also fully restored. When the lime kiln was in use the small, attached room had served as a storage area but it had been gone since at least the 1930s. Using early historical photographs as references, the lime house was reconstructed atop a stone foundation. The lumber used to construct the new lime house was authentic late 19th-century barn lumber. Atop, the lime house, like the kiln itself, an aluminum roof was placed.

The restoration was completed in 1993 at a final cost of around $10,000.
