= Griggsville Landing Lime Kiln =

- U.S. National Register of Historic Places
- Location within Illinois Location within the United States
- Nearest city: Valley City, Illinois
- Coordinates: 39°42′22″N 90°39′13″W
- Area: 0.2 acres (0.081 ha)
- Built: c. 1850
- Architectural style: Periodic Lime Kiln
- NRHP reference No.: 99000974
- Added to NRHP: August 30, 1999

The Griggsville Landing Lime Kiln is located near the village of Valley City, Illinois in Pike County. The periodic lime kiln is listed on the National Register of Historic Places, a designation it gained in August 1999. It is actually within the boundaries of the Ray Norbut State Fish and Wildlife Area. The kiln represents an example of an 1850s lime kiln, one of the best-preserved examples of such a kiln. In its heyday the kiln's raw product would have been quicklime. The kiln is one of twelve Pike County sites included in the National Register of Historic Places. Some other examples are the Lyman Scott House, in Summer Hill and the New Philadelphia Town Site, somewhere near Barry, Illinois.

== Griggsville Landing ==
The lime kiln is about one quarter mile north of a town site once known as Griggsville Landing. The Landing was a steamboat stop on the Illinois River, which started in the 1830s. It was home to a warehouse, a boat yard, hotel and a grist mill. The lime kiln here is a remnant of a commercial operation that would have flourished when the steamboat stop at Griggsville Landing was operational. Such commercial operations involving lime would become impossible after the American Civil War as the lime industry became the target of industrial intensification.

== History ==
The Griggsville Landing Lime Kiln is one of the best-preserved periodic lime kilns found in the U.S. state of Illinois. When it was built is unknown but it has been established that it is likely it was constructed in the mid-1850s. Local traditions hold that the Griggsville Landing kiln was used by English stonemason William Hobson. It is said Hobson used the kiln in conjunction with the construction of homes, barns and stone arch bridges in the area during the 19th century. A report prepared for the Illinois Department of Conservation posits that the kiln was constructed for James Hutchinson after he purchased the property in 1854, based on available land, deed, and tax records.

== Architecture ==
The lime kiln was built into the side of the river bluff. It was constructed of local quarried stone and without mortar; the stones were either laid dry or with mud as a binder. The kiln is approximately 19 ft (5.8 m) in diameter and 17 ft (5.2 m) with 3 ft (0.91 m) thick walls. The remains of two wing walls at a 45 degree angle are barely visible above ground, but originally may have extended at least two-thirds of the total height of the kiln. A stone arch at the entrance measures approximately 4 ft (1.2 m) wide, 3.5 ft (1.1 m) tall, and 12 in (300 mm) thick.

== Kiln technology ==
The kiln at Griggsville Landing is known as a periodic kiln. The periodic kiln is an older technology which was used in the United States mostly before the Civil War. The technology utilized at Griggsville Landing, however, is far superior to the so-called heap kilns used in lime production.

=== Heap kilns ===
A heap kiln is a fairly simple kiln. It is made by stacking alternating layers of wood, for fuel, and limestone blocks on the ground or in a pit. The method is fast but highly inefficient. Despite these drawbacks, the heap kiln was used as means of lime production in association with land clearing operations. Heap kilns inherent flaw lies in the impossibility of burn-quality control in the log heaps. The product that resulted from this method of lime production was often of variable quality and used for little other than fertilizer. Heap kilns were being replaced in the more urban parts of the country as early as 1818.

=== Periodic kilns ===
The heap kiln went by the wayside as the periodic kiln came into vogue. Periodic kilns are much more efficient than the log heap kiln that preceded them. The most efficient type of periodic kiln is a stone or brick walled vertical kiln. This walled vertical kiln is what appears at Griggsville Landing. The specific kiln at Griggsville has an opening at the base and at the top, with walls nearly three feet thick. The appearance of the walls of the Griggsville Landing Kiln suggests that they were either dry laid or laid with a mud mortar that has since been dusted away by time. The walls of the vertical kiln at Griggsville Landing rise 17 feet above the forest floor and the inside has a diameter of 13 feet.

== Other lime kilns ==
The Griggsville Landing Lime Kiln is one of only a few old lime kilns preserved across the state of Illinois. Some examples can be found in such places as, Maeystown, where a periodic vertical kiln remains, Kankakee River State Park in Will County, where pieces of an old lime kiln lie in an old limestone quarry. Other kilns can be found in Ogle County, near Polo, where a stone kiln remains, a poorly preserved vertical kiln in Port Byron, and a well-preserved kiln in Cordova, Illinois.

== See also ==
- Buffalo Grove Lime Kiln
- List of archaeological sites on the National Register of Historic Places in Illinois
