= Ray Norbut State Fish and Wildlife Area =

State park in Illinois, USA

- IUCN category IV (habitat/species management area)
- Location within Illinois Location within the United States
- Location: Pike County, Illinois, USA
- Nearest city: Griggsville, Illinois
- Coordinates: 39°40′42″N 90°38′43″W
- Area: 1,140 acres (460 ha)
- Established: 1970
- Governing body: Illinois Department of Natural Resources

The Ray Norbut State Fish and Wildlife Area is a 1,140-acre (460 ha) state park located near Griggsville in Pike County, Illinois. It borders on the Illinois River and is primarily made of steeply sloped bluffland that is part of the river's valley. Heavily wooded, this region is managed for whitetail deer hunting. The Ray Norbut complex also includes Big Blue Island, a 100-acre (40 ha) riparian island in the Illinois River. The park is managed by the Illinois Department of Natural Resources (IDNR).

== Ecosystems ==
The mainland section of the Ray Norbut State Fish and Wildlife Area is made up of Illinois River bluffland oak and hickory temperate hardwood forest. It centers on Napoleon Hollow, a steep-sided ravine cut into the limestone bluff, that discharges rainwater from the forest down into the Illinois River. Whitetail deer and a wide variety of small mammals thrive on the acorn mast generated by the oak/hickory forest. Arborists took core samples from two white oak trees in 2001, and found that one tree was 378 years old and the other one 322 years old.

Big Blue Island is wooded with wetland trees such as the cottonwood, silver maple, and willow. The island, and the mainland river banks and bluffs surrounding it, are noted wintering spots of the bald eagle, which eats the Asian carps and bottom-feeding fish that live in the Illinois River.

== History ==
Archeological evidence indicates that the Napoleon Hollow area has been used by hunters for over 7,000 years. The region's obvious resources attracted Euro-American settlement, with frontiersmen founding the village of Big Blue Hollow at the southern end of the state park about 1840. After several decades of life as a local center for hunting, fishing, and grain-milling, Big Blue Hollow was bypassed by Illinois railroads, and the hamlet dwindled out of existence.

Another village site within the state park, Griggsville Landing, met a similar fate. Although the landing served steamboats during the decades prior to the Civil War, the landing could not survive the triumph of railroad technology over steamboating. A small factory ruin, the Griggsville Landing Lime Kiln (circa 1850), survives as a reminder of the vanished village.

The state of Illinois acquired 860 acres (350 ha) of the area in and around Napoleon Hollow in 1970, dedicating the land to hunting as the Pike County Conservation Area. The conservation area was enlarged by a further 280 acres (110 ha) in 1988. IDNR changed the name of the park from Pike County Conservation Area to Ray Norbut Fish and Wildlife Area in 1995 to honor a longtime head of the state parks division of the department.

== Controversy ==
The Central Illinois Expressway, now part of Interstate 72, was a key Illinois Department of Transportation (IDOT) project of the 1980s, meant to create the first four-lane, divided-highway link between western Illinois (particularly the Quincy, Illinois area) and the U.S. Interstate Highway System. IDOT engineers decided that the best place for the freeway to cross the Illinois River was through the Pike County Conservation Area, with the four-lane highway using Napoleon Hollow as a ramp to achieve the gradient necessary to mount the bluffs that border the Illinois River's western edge.

Environmentalists protested the use of the historic hollow and its bald-eagle habitat for construction purposes. However, Illinois Governor James R. Thompson decided to follow the engineers' recommendations and build the Western Illinois segment of Interstate 72 through Napoleon Hollow.

As a result of this decision, what is now the Ray Norbut State Fish and Wildlife Area is bifurcated by Interstate 72. The interstate's Exit 35, at Griggsville, provides access to the state park.
