= Griggsville, Illinois =

Town in Illinois, United States

- Town
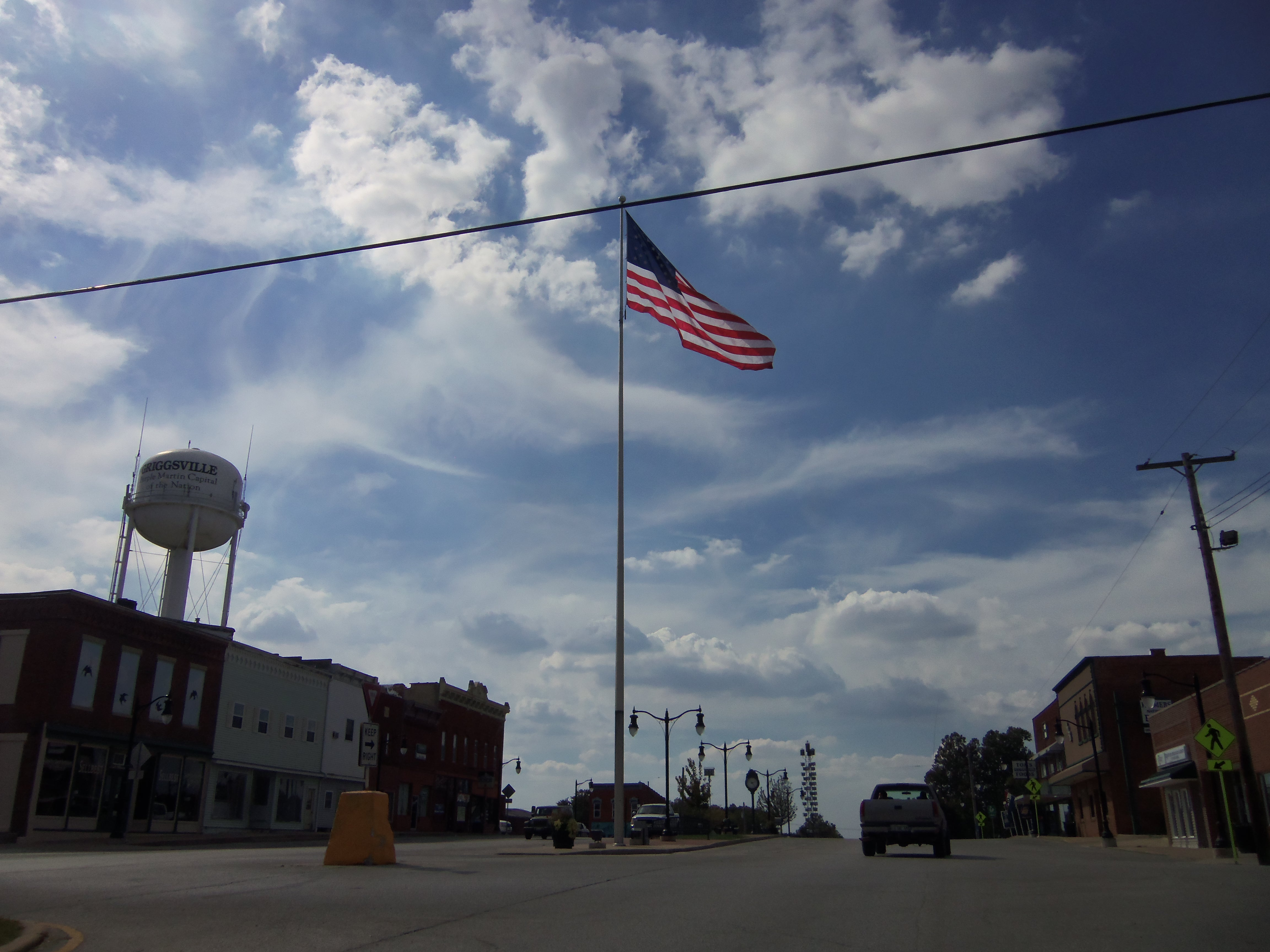
- Downtown Griggsville
- Motto: The Bird City
- Location of Griggsville in Pike County, Illinois.
- Coordinates: 39°42′28″N 90°43′40″W
- Country: United States
- State: Illinois
- County: Pike
- Township: Griggsville
- Founded: 1833
- Incorporated: September 10, 1872
- Named for: Richard Griggs

Area
  - Total: 1.10 sq mi (2.86 km^{2})
  - Land: 1.10 sq mi (2.86 km^{2})
  - Water: 0 sq mi (0.00 km^{2})
- Elevation: 692 ft (211 m)

Population (2020)
  - Total: 1,097
  - Density: 992.2/sq mi (383.09/km^{2})
- Time zone: UTC-6 (CST)
  - Summer (DST): UTC-5 (CDT)
- ZIP code: 62340
- FIPS code: 17-31771
- GNIS feature ID: 2394251
- Website: www.griggsville-il.org

Griggsville is a rural town in Griggsville Township, Pike County, Illinois, United States. The population was 1,097 according to the 2020 census.

== History ==
Griggsville was named for its founder, Richard Griggs.

In 1833, Griggsville was platted by pioneers Richard Griggs (for whom the town is named), Joshua Stanford, and Nathan W. Jones. On September 10, 1872, Griggsville was officially incorporated.

=== Gallery ===
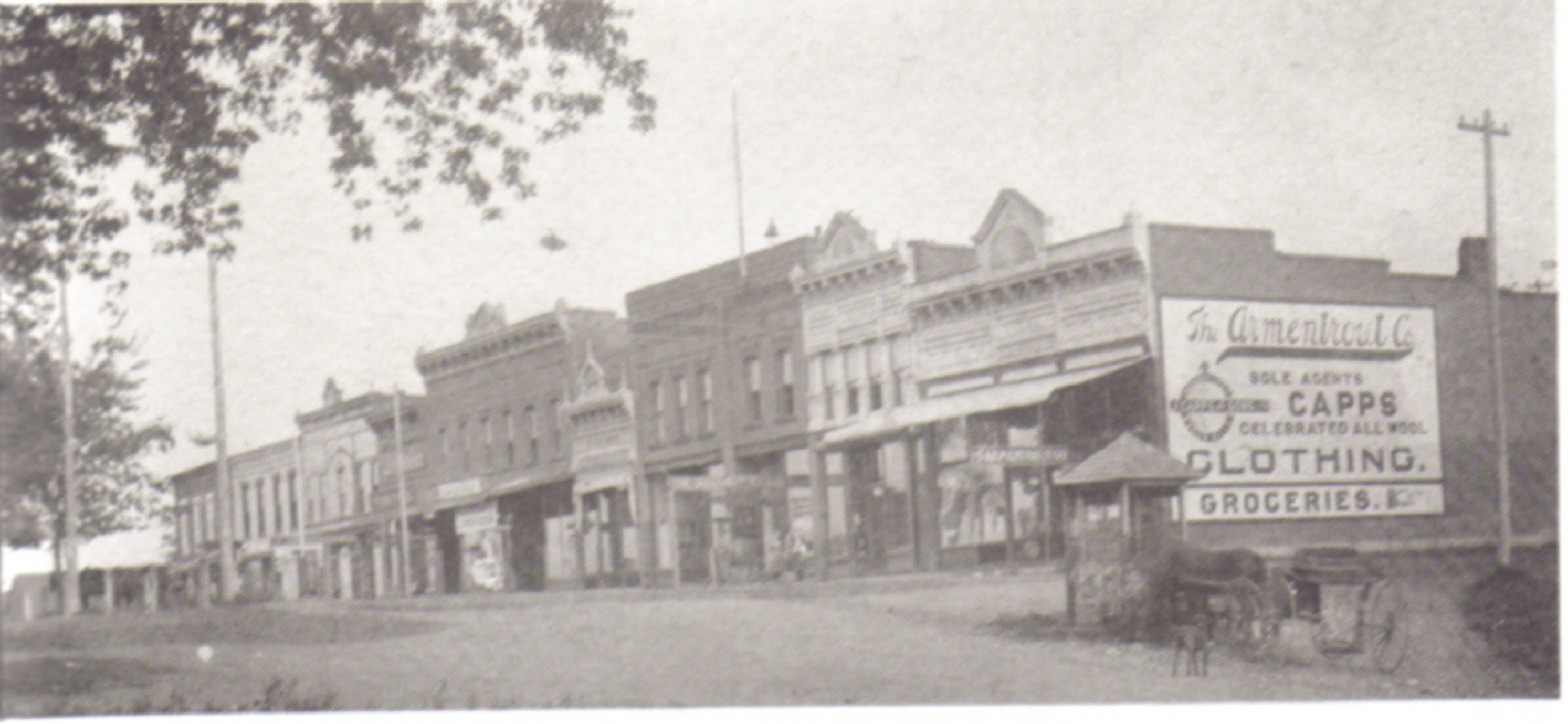
Griggsville Square c. 1900

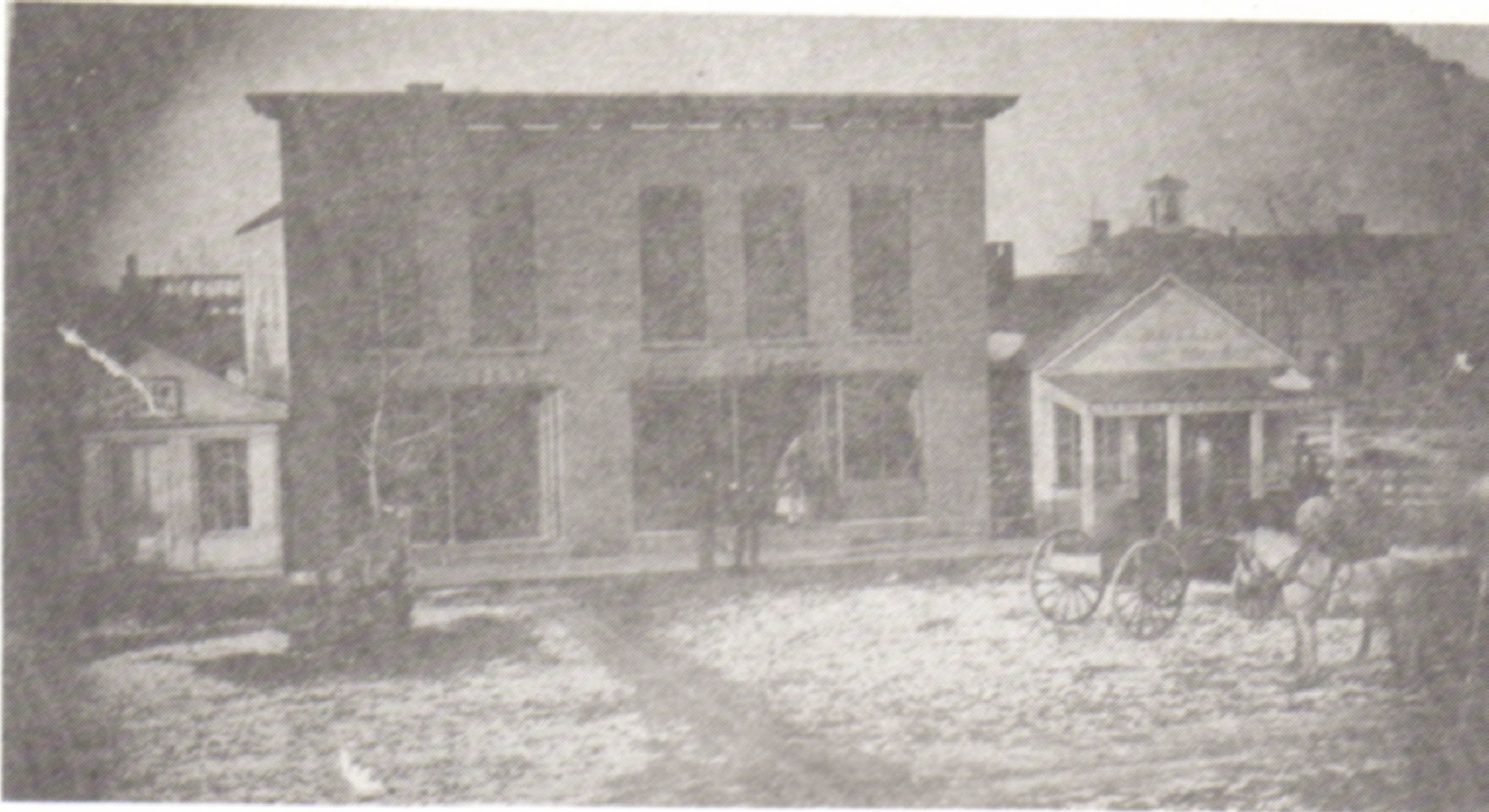
Ayres & Lombard Bank & Store

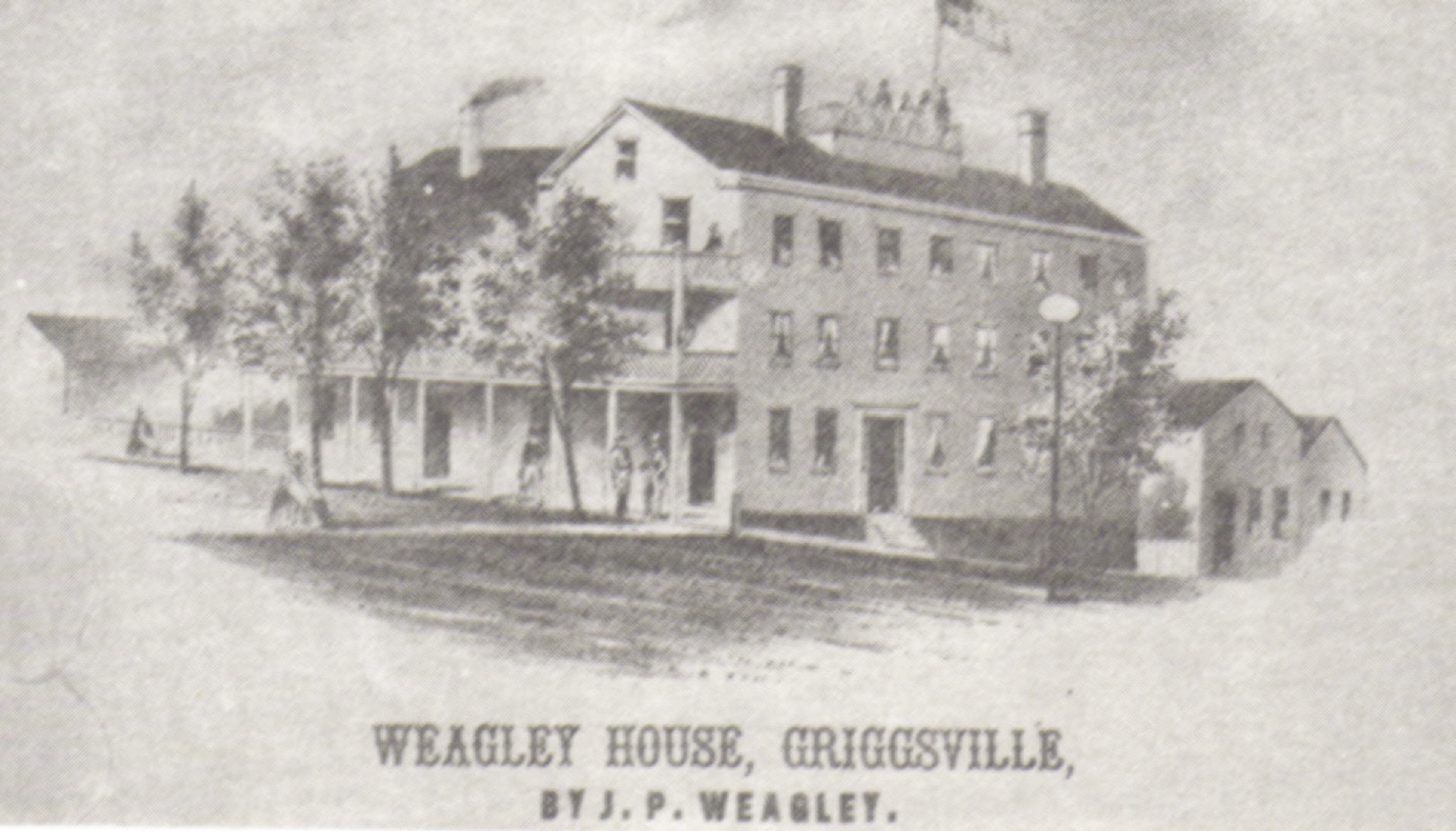
Weagley Hotel

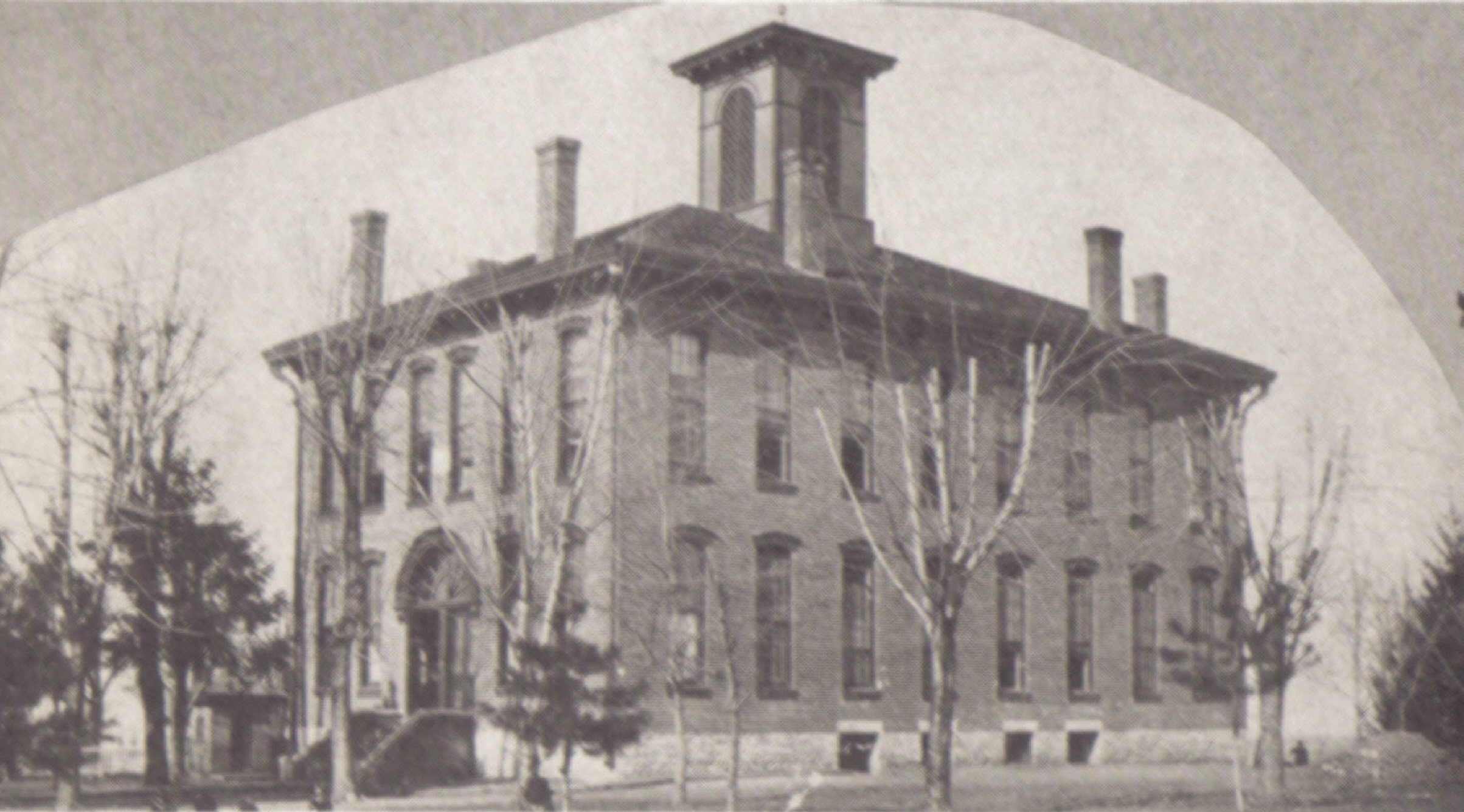
Griggsville Academy

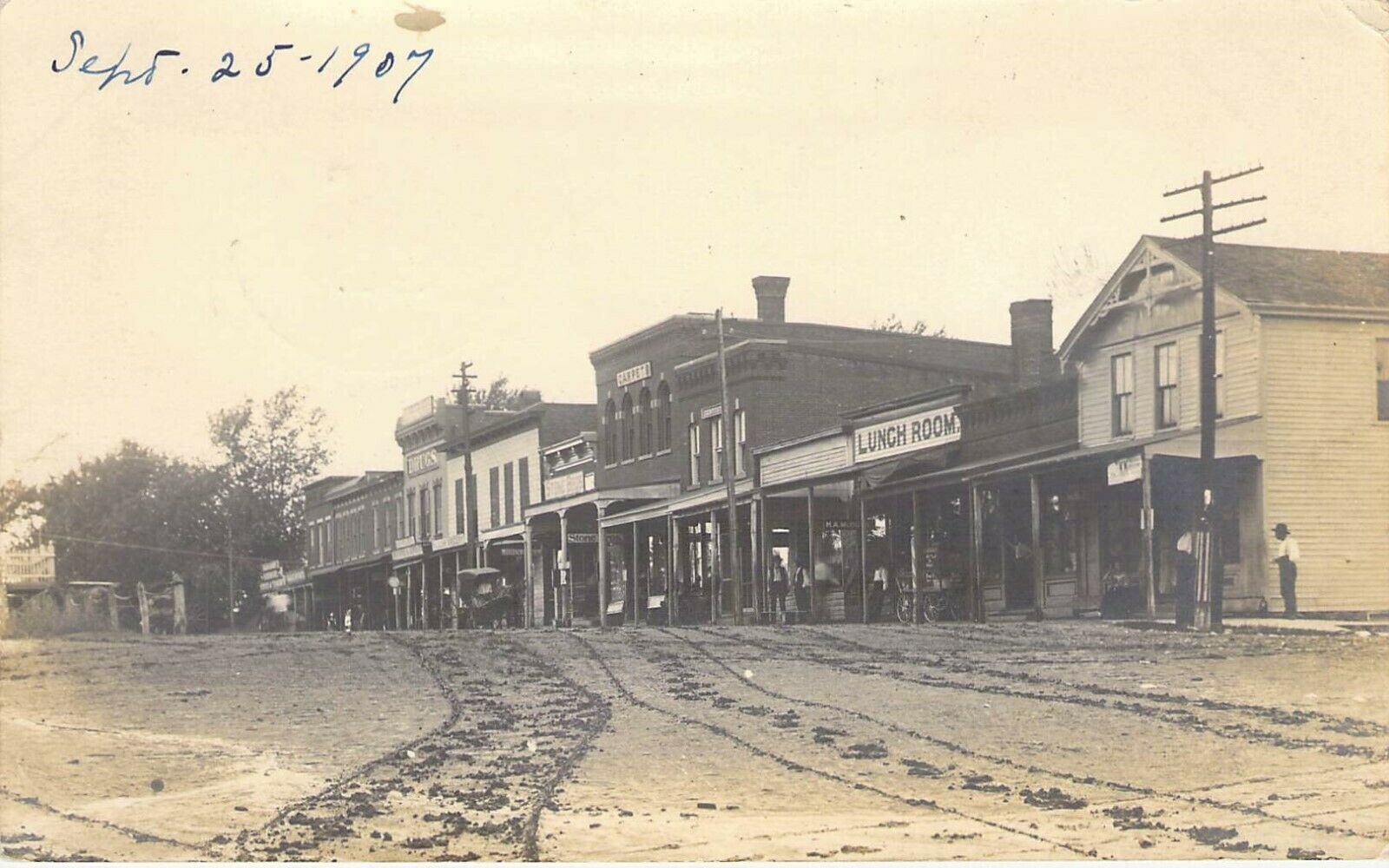
Griggsville in 1907

== Geography ==
The community is in northeast Pike County approximately four miles west of the Illinois River. Pittsfield lies about seven miles to the southwest along Illinois Route 107.

According to the 2010 census, Griggsville has a total area of 1.08 square miles (2.80 km^{2}), all land.

== Demographics ==
Historical population
Census	Pop.	Note	%±
1850	585		—
1870	1,456		—
1880	1,515		4.1%
1890	1,400		−7.6%
1900	1,404		0.3%
1910	1,262		−10.1%
1920	1,343		6.4%
1930	1,184		−11.8%
1940	1,266		6.9%
1950	1,199		−5.3%
1960	1,240		3.4%
1970	1,245		0.4%
1980	1,301		4.5%
1990	1,218		−6.4%
2000	1,258		3.3%
2010	1,226		−2.5%
2020	1,097		−10.5%
U.S. Decennial Census

As of the census of 2000, there were 1,258 people, 500 households, and 360 families residing in the city. The population density was 1,215.0 inhabitants per square mile (469.1/km^{2}). There were 548 housing units at an average density of 529.3 per square mile (204.4/km^{2}). The racial makeup of the city was 99.21% White, 0.16% African American, 0.08% Asian, 0.24% from other races, and 0.32% from two or more races. Hispanic or Latino of any race were 0.24% of the population.

There were 500 households, out of which 36.2% had children under the age of 18 living with them, 58.2% were married couples living together, 10.2% had a female householder with no husband present, and 27.8% were non-families. 24.2% of all households were made up of individuals, and 12.0% had someone living alone who was 65 years of age or older. The average household size was 2.49 and the average family size was 2.92.

In the city, the population was spread out, with 27.9% under the age of 18, 6.6% from 18 to 24, 26.9% from 25 to 44, 22.1% from 45 to 64, and 16.5% who were 65 years of age or older. The median age was 37 years. For every 100 females, there were 92.6 males. For every 100 females age 18 and over, there were 88.2 males.

The median income for a household in the city was $31,875, and the median income for a family was $36,071. Males had a median income of $27,454 versus $18,182 for females. The per capita income for the city was $14,578. About 10.2% of families and 12.3% of the population were below the poverty line, including 15.3% of those under age 18 and 10.8% of those age 65 or over.

== Events ==
Griggsville hosts the Apple Festival on the third weekend of each September, along with the Western Illinois Fair, traditionally held during the third week of June. The regional Western Illinois Fair servicing seven surrounding counties is the oldest continuously operating local fair in the state of Illinois, held annually since 1888.

=== Purple martins ===
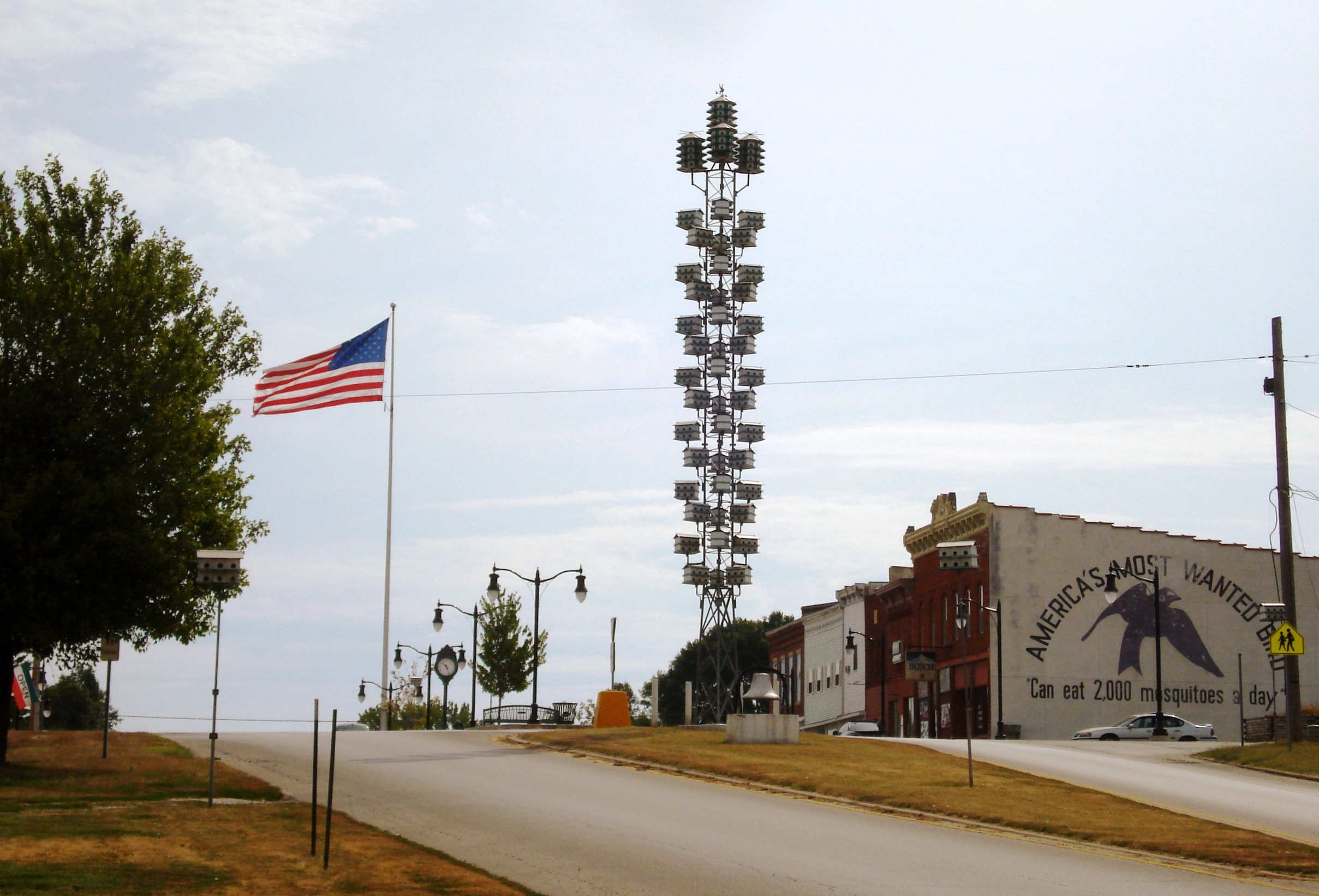
Purple martin houses

Griggsville is located between the Mississippi River and the Illinois River and the hot muggy summers are the perfect habitat for mosquitoes. Amid growing concern over the use of pesticides to control mosquitoes, the town came up with an alternate abatement method. J.L. Wade, a Griggsville resident and owner of a local antenna manufacturing factory realized that Griggsville was right in the migration path of the purple martin, the largest bird in the swallow family, supposedly able to eat 2,000 mosquitoes in a single day. J.L. Wade quickly realized that to get the purple martins to stay, he simply needed to give them a reason to stay, so he converted his antenna factory into a bird house building factory. The mosquito population dwindled, which lead the town to adopt the nickname "The Purple Martin Capital of the Nation", as well as labeling the purple martin "America's Most Wanted Bird." Additionally, Wade's purple martin business, formerly Trio Manufacturing, published a newsletter called The Nature Society News. The purple martin factory has been recently sold to a Chicago businessman. Griggsville has installed over 5,000 birdhouses along the city streets, including a 562-apartment high rise installed in 1962, reaching a height of 70 ft.

== Notable person ==
- Lew Hitch, basketball player for the Minneapolis Lakers (1951–1957)

== Points of interest ==
- The Purple Martin High-Rise is located in central Griggsville on Illinois Route 107.
- Ray Norbut State Fish and Wildlife Area
- Griggsville Historic District
- Lighthouse Baptist church, the oldest continuous operating church in Pike County.

== See also ==
- Griggsville Landing Lime Kiln

== Sources ==
Stead, George A. "Prologue to the Genealogy of the Steads" [transcribed by JN Mahon - 1999] "Griggsville--Boom, Town on the Frontier" retrieved from archives at the Skinner House in Griggsville, IL. November 29, 2007
