= Flint Township, Pike County, Illinois =

Coordinates: 39°42′29″N 90°39′16″W

Flint Township
- Township
- Location in Pike County

- Pike County's location in Illinois
- Country: United States
- State: Illinois
- County: Pike
- Established: November 8, 1853

Area
  - Total: 16.17 sq mi (41.9 km^{2})
  - Land: 15.31 sq mi (39.7 km^{2})
  - Water: 0.86 sq mi (2.2 km^{2}) 5.32%

Population (2010)
  - Estimate (2016): 94
  - Density: 6.3/sq mi (2.4/km^{2})
- Time zone: UTC-6 (CST)
  - Summer (DST): UTC-5 (CDT)
- FIPS code: 17-149-26415

Flint Township is located in Pike County, Illinois. As of the 2010 census, its population was 96 and it contained 47 housing units.

== Geography ==
According to the 2010 census, the township has a total area of 16.17 square miles (41.9 km^{2}), of which 15.31 square miles (39.7 km^{2}) (or 94.68%) is land and 0.86 square miles (2.2 km^{2}) (or 5.32%) is water.

== Demographics ==
Historical population
Census	Pop.	Note	%±
2016 (est.)	94
U.S. Decennial Census
