= Detroit Township, Pike County, Illinois =

Coordinates: 39°37′15″N 90°38′30″W

Detroit Township
- Township
- Location in Pike County

- Pike County's location in Illinois
- Country: United States
- State: Illinois
- County: Pike
- Established: November 8, 1853

Area
  - Total: 26.98 sq mi (69.9 km^{2})
  - Land: 26.24 sq mi (68.0 km^{2})
  - Water: 0.74 sq mi (1.9 km^{2}) 2.74%

Population (2010)
  - Estimate (2016): 304
  - Density: 11.9/sq mi (4.6/km^{2})
- Time zone: UTC-6 (CST)
  - Summer (DST): UTC-5 (CDT)
- FIPS code: 17-149-19694

Detroit Township is located in Pike County, Illinois. As of the 2010 census, its population was 312 and it contained 163 housing units.

== History ==
Detroit Township is named after Detroit, Michigan.

== Geography ==
According to the 2010 census, the township has a total area of 26.98 square miles (69.9 km^{2}), of which 26.24 square miles (68.0 km^{2}) (or 97.26%) is land and 0.74 square miles (1.9 km^{2}) (or 2.74%) is water.

== Demographics ==
Historical population
Census	Pop.	Note	%±
2016 (est.)	304
U.S. Decennial Census
