= Illinois's 17th congressional district =

U.S. House district for Illinois

Coordinates: 41°23′22″N 90°13′07″W

- Interactive map of district boundaries since January 3, 2023. Points indicate major cities in the district.
- Representative: Eric Sorensen; D–Moline
- Area: 4,571.4 mi^{2} (11,840 km^{2})
- Distribution: 73.3% urban; 26.7% rural
- Population (2025): 732,713
- Median household income: $61,962
- Ethnicity: 67.5% White; 14.2% Black; 11.2% Hispanic; 4.4% Two or more races; 2.1% Asian; 0.6% other
- Cook PVI: D+3

The 17th congressional district of Illinois is represented by Democrat Eric Sorensen. It includes most of the northwestern portion of the state, with most of its population living on the Illinois side of the Quad Cities, as well as parts of Peoria and Rockford.

The 17th congressional district has shifted northward after redistricting in 2012. It subsequently lost Quincy and Decatur, as well as its share of Springfield. It was generally thought that the redrawn map would allow the district to revert to the Democrats, who held it without interruption from 1983 to 2011. As expected, incumbent Representative Bobby Schilling was defeated, after serving only one term, by Democratic opponent Cheri Bustos in the 2012 election cycle, who served until 2023.

The boundaries were drawn in a bipartisan deal to protect both Democratic incumbent Lane Evans and neighboring Republican incumbents. The lines of the district were drawn to move Republican voters into neighboring districts and to include Democratic neighborhoods in Springfield and Decatur. Evans retired in 2006 as a result of declining health, and the seat was won by his longtime aide Phil Hare. Although the district had been designed to elect a Democrat, Hare lost in 2010 to Republican pizzeria owner Bobby Schilling. In 2012, Democrat Cheri Bustos won the district election.

== History ==
=== 2011 redistricting ===
The district covers parts of Peoria, Tazewell and Winnebago counties, and all of Carroll, Fulton, Henderson, Henry, Jo Daviess, Knox, Mercer, Rock Island, Stephenson, Warren and Whiteside counties, as of the 2011 redistricting which followed the 2010 census. All or parts of Canton, East Moline, Freeport, Galesburg, Kewanee, Moline, Peoria, Rock Island, Rockford, Pekin and Sterling are included. The representatives for these districts were elected in the 2012 primary and general elections, and the boundaries became effective on January 5, 2013.

=== 2001 redistricting ===
From 2003 to 2013 the district was known as "the rabbit on a skateboard" for its unusual shape devised as the outcome of gerrymandering.

=== Representation ===
From 1982 to 2011, the district's representatives hailed from Rock Island, these being Lane Evans and Phil Hare. Since 2013, the district's representatives have hailed from neighboring Moline, and include Cheri Bustos and Eric Sorenson.

In early 2021, Cheri Bustos announced her intention to retire at the end of the 117th Congress. In November 2021, former WREX and WQAD meteorologist Eric Sorenson announced his candidacy for the seat. He later won the election with 52% of the vote.

== Composition ==
For the 118th and successive Congresses (based on redistricting following the 2020 census), the district contains all or portions of the following counties, townships, and municipalities:

Carroll County (19)

All 19 townships and municipalities

Fulton County (29)

Avon, Banner, Banner Township, Bryant, Buckheart Township, Canton, Canton Township, Cass Township, Cuba, Deerfield Township, Dunfermline, Ellisville, Ellisville Township, Fairview, Fairview Township, Farmington (part, shared with Peoria County), Farmington Township, Harris Township, Joshua Township, Lee Township, London Mils (part, shared with Knox County), Marietta, Norris, Orion Township, Putnam Township, Smithfield, St. David, Union Township, Young Hickory Township

Henry County (8)

Cleveland, Colona, Colona Township (part, also 16th), Galva, Galva Township, Kewanee, Kewanee Township, Wethersfield Township

Knox County (36)

All 36 townships and municipalities

McDonough County (6)

Bardolph, Emmet Township (part, also 15th), Macomb (part, also 15th), Macomb Township, Mound Township (part, also 15th), Scotland Township (part, also 15th)

McLean County (10)

Allin Township (part, also 16th), Bloomington (part, also 16th), Bloomington Township (part, also 16th), Dale Township (part, also 16th; includes Shirley), Dry Grove Township (part, also 16th), Funks Grove Township, McLean, Mount Hope Township, Normal (part, also 16th), Normal Township (part, also 16th)

Mercer County (12)

Alexis (part, shared with Warren County), Greene Township, Matherville, North Henderson, North Henderson Township, Preemption Township, Richland Grove Township, Rivoli Township, Sherrard, Suez Township, Viola, Windsor

Peoria County (21)

Bartonville, Bellevue (part, also 16th), Elmwood, Elmwood Township, Glasford, Hanna City, Hollis Township, Kingston Mines, Limestone Township (part, also 16th), Logan Township, Mapleton, Norwood (part, also 16th), Pekin (part, also 16th; shared with Tazewell County), Peoria (part, also 16th), Peoria Heights, Richwoods Township, Rosefield Township (part, also 16th), Timber Township, Trivoli Township, West Peoria, West Peoria Township (part, also 16th)

Rock Island County (33)

All 33 townships and municipalities

Stephenson County (16)

Cedarville (part, also 16th), Erin Township, Florence Township, Freeport, Freeport Township, German Valley, Harlem Township, Jefferson Township, Kent Township, Lancaster Township, Lena (part, also 16th), Loran Township, Pearl City, Ridott, Ridott Township, Silver Creek Township

Tazewell County (15)

Armington, Boynton Township, Cincinnati Township (part, also 16th), Delavan, Delavan Township, Dillon Township, Green Valley, Hittle Township, Hopedale Township (part, also 16th), Little Mackinaw Township (part, also 16th), Malone Township, Sand Prairie Township, Spring Lake Township, Pekin (part, also 16th; shared with Peoria County), South Pekin (part, also 16th)

Warren County (6)

Alexis (part, shared with Mercer County), Coldbrook Township, Kelly Township, Monmouth, Monmouth Township, Spring Grove Township

Whiteside County (33)

All 33 townships and municipalities

Winnebago County (5)

Cherry Valley Township (part, also 16th), Loves Park (part, also 16th), Rockford (part, also 16th; shared with Ogle County), Rockford Township (part, also 16th), Seward Township

== Recent election results from statewide races ==
Year	Office	Results
2008	President	Obama 60% - 38%
2012	President	Obama 59% - 41%
2016	President	Clinton 50% - 43%
2016	Senate	Duckworth 50% - 44%
2016	Comptroller (Spec.)	Mendoza 48% - 47%
2018	Governor	Pritzker 50% - 41%
2018	Attorney General	Raoul 50% - 47%
2018	Secretary of State	White 64% - 33%
2018	Comptroller	Mendoza 55% - 41%
2018	Treasurer	Frerichs 54% - 42%
2020	President	Biden 53% - 45%
2020	Senate	Durbin 53% - 43%
2022	Senate	Duckworth 52% - 45%
2022	Governor	Pritzker 50% - 47%
2022	Attorney General	DeVore 49% - 48%
2022	Secretary of State	Brady 51% - 47%
2022	Comptroller	Mendoza 52% - 46%
2022	Treasurer	Frerichs 49% - 48%
2024	President	Harris 51% - 46%

== List of members representing the district ==
Representative	Party	Years	Cong ress	Electoral history	District location
District created March 4, 1873
William R. Morrison (Waterloo)	Democratic	March 4, 1873 – March 3, 1883	43rd 44th 45th 46th 47th	Elected in 1872. Re-elected in 1874. Re-elected in 1876. Re-elected in 1878. Re-elected in 1880. Redistricted to the 18th district.	
Samuel W. Moulton (Shelbyville)	Democratic	March 4, 1883 – March 3, 1885	48th	Redistricted from the 15th district and re-elected in 1882. Retired.	
John R. Eden (Sullivan)	Democratic	March 4, 1885 – March 3, 1887	49th	Elected in 1884. Lost re-election.	
Edward Lane (Hillsboro)	Democratic	March 4, 1887 – March 3, 1895	50th 51st 52nd 53rd	Elected in 1886. Re-elected in 1888. Re-elected in 1890. Re-elected in 1892. Redistricted to the 18th district and lost re-election there.	
James A. Connolly (Springfield)	Republican	March 4, 1895 – March 3, 1899	54th 55th	Elected in 1894. Re-elected in 1896. Retired.	
Ben F. Caldwell (Chatham)	Democratic	March 4, 1899 – March 3, 1903	56th 57th	Elected in 1898. Re-elected in 1900. Redistricted to the 21st district.	
John A. Sterling (Bloomington)	Republican	March 4, 1903 – March 3, 1913	58th 59th 60th 61st 62nd	Elected in 1902. Re-elected in 1904. Re-elected in 1906. Re-elected in 1908. Re-elected in 1910. Lost re-election.	
Louis FitzHenry (Bloomington)	Democratic	March 4, 1913 – March 3, 1915	63rd	Elected in 1912. Lost re-election.	
John A. Sterling (Bloomington)	Republican	March 4, 1915 – October 17, 1918	64th 65th	Elected in 1914. Re-elected in 1916. Died.	
Vacant		October 17, 1918 – March 3, 1919	65th		
Frank L. Smith (Dwight)	Republican	March 4, 1919 – March 3, 1921	66th	Elected in 1918. Retired to run for U.S. Senator.	
Frank H. Funk (Bloomington)	Republican	March 4, 1921 – March 3, 1927	67th 68th 69th	Elected in 1920. Re-elected in 1922. Re-elected in 1924. Lost renomination.	
Homer W. Hall (Bloomington)	Republican	March 4, 1927 – March 3, 1933	70th 71st 72nd	Elected in 1926. Re-elected in 1928. Re-elected in 1930. Lost re-election.	
Frank Gillespie (Bloomington)	Democratic	March 4, 1933 – January 3, 1935	73rd	Elected in 1932. Lost re-election.	
Leslie C. Arends (Melvin)	Republican	January 3, 1935 – January 3, 1973	74th 75th 76th 77th 78th 79th 80th 81st 82nd 83rd 84th 85th 86th 87th 88th 89th 90th 91st 92nd	Elected in 1934. Re-elected in 1936. Re-elected in 1938. Re-elected in 1940. Re-elected in 1942. Re-elected in 1944. Re-elected in 1946. Re-elected in 1948. Re-elected in 1950. Re-elected in 1952. Re-elected in 1954. Re-elected in 1956. Re-elected in 1958. Re-elected in 1960. Re-elected in 1962. Re-elected in 1964. Re-elected in 1966. Re-elected in 1968. Re-elected in 1970. Redistricted to the 15th district.	
George M. O'Brien (Joliet)	Republican	January 3, 1973 – January 3, 1983	93rd 94th 95th 96th 97th	Elected in 1972. Re-elected in 1974. Re-elected in 1976. Re-elected in 1978. Re-elected in 1980. Redistricted to the 4th district.	
Lane Evans (Rock Island)	Democratic	January 3, 1983 – January 3, 2007	98th 99th 100th 101st 102nd 103rd 104th 105th 106th 107th 108th 109th	Elected in 1982. Re-elected in 1984. Re-elected in 1986. Re-elected in 1988. Re-elected in 1990. Re-elected in 1992. Re-elected in 1994. Re-elected in 1996. Re-elected in 1998. Re-elected in 2000. Re-elected in 2002. Re-elected in 2004. Retired.	1983–1993 [data missing]
Lane Evans (Rock Island)	Democratic	January 3, 1983 – January 3, 2007	98th 99th 100th 101st 102nd 103rd 104th 105th 106th 107th 108th 109th	Elected in 1982. Re-elected in 1984. Re-elected in 1986. Re-elected in 1988. Re-elected in 1990. Re-elected in 1992. Re-elected in 1994. Re-elected in 1996. Re-elected in 1998. Re-elected in 2000. Re-elected in 2002. Re-elected in 2004. Retired.	1993–2003 [data missing]
Lane Evans (Rock Island)	Democratic	January 3, 1983 – January 3, 2007	98th 99th 100th 101st 102nd 103rd 104th 105th 106th 107th 108th 109th	Elected in 1982. Re-elected in 1984. Re-elected in 1986. Re-elected in 1988. Re-elected in 1990. Re-elected in 1992. Re-elected in 1994. Re-elected in 1996. Re-elected in 1998. Re-elected in 2000. Re-elected in 2002. Re-elected in 2004. Retired.	2003–2013
Phil Hare (Rock Island)	Democratic	January 3, 2007 – January 3, 2011	110th 111th	Elected in 2006. Re-elected in 2008. Lost re-election.	2003–2013
Bobby Schilling (Colona)	Republican	January 3, 2011 – January 3, 2013	112th	Elected in 2010. Lost re-election.	2003–2013
Cheri Bustos (Moline)	Democratic	January 3, 2013 – January 3, 2023	113th 114th 115th 116th 117th	Elected in 2012. Re-elected in 2014. Re-elected in 2016. Re-elected in 2018. Re-elected in 2020. Retired.	2013–2023
Eric Sorensen (Moline)	Democratic	January 3, 2023 – present	118th 119th	Elected in 2022. Re-elected in 2024. Re-elected in 2026.	2023–present

== Election results ==
=== 1982 ===
Illinois's 17th congressional district election, 1982
Party	Candidate	Votes	%
Democratic	Lane Evans (incumbent)	94,483	52.84
Republican	Kenneth McMillan	84,347	47.16
Total votes		178,830	100.00
Democratic hold			

=== 1984 ===
Illinois's 17th congressional district election, 1984
Party	Candidate	Votes	%
Democratic	Lane Evans (incumbent)	128,273	56.67
Republican	Kenneth McMillan	98,069	43.33
Total votes		226,342	100.00
Democratic hold			

=== 1986 ===
Illinois's 17th congressional district election, 1986
Party	Candidate	Votes	%
Democratic	Lane Evans (incumbent)	85,442	55.65
Republican	Sam McHard	68,101	44.35
Total votes		153,543	100.00
Democratic hold			

=== 1988 ===
Illinois's 17th congressional district election, 1988
Party	Candidate	Votes	%
Democratic	Lane Evans (incumbent)	132,130	64.87
Republican	William E. Stewart	71,560	35.13
Total votes		203,690	100.00
Democratic hold			

=== 1990 ===
Illinois's 17th congressional district election, 1992
Party	Candidate	Votes	%
Democratic	Lane Evans (incumbent)	102,062	66.52
Republican	Dan Lee	51,380	33.48
Total votes		153,442	100.00
Democratic hold			

=== 1992 ===
Illinois's 17th congressional district election, 1992
Party	Candidate	Votes	%
Democratic	Lane Evans (incumbent)	156,233	60.10
Republican	Kenneth Schloemer	103,719	39.90
Total votes		259,952	100.00
Democratic hold			

=== 1994 ===
Illinois's 17th congressional district election, 1998
Party	Candidate	Votes	%
Democratic	Lane Evans (incumbent)	95,312	54.53
Republican	Jim Anderson	79,471	45.47
Total votes		174,783	100.00
Democratic hold			

=== 1996 ===
Illinois's 17th congressional district election, 1996
Party	Candidate	Votes	%
Democratic	Lane Evans (incumbent)	120,008	51.913
Republican	Mark W. Baker	109,240	47.254
Libertarian	William J. Herrman	1,925	0.833
Total votes		231,173	100.00
Democratic hold			

=== 1998 ===
Illinois's 17th congressional district election, 1998
Party	Candidate	Votes	%
Democratic	Lane Evans (incumbent)	100,128	51.56
Republican	Mark W. Baker	94,072	48.44
Total votes		194,200	100.00
Democratic hold			

=== 2000 ===
Illinois's 17th congressional district election, 2000
Party	Candidate	Votes	%
Democratic	Lane Evans (incumbent)	132,494	54.90
Republican	Mark W. Baker	108,853	45.10
Total votes		241,347	100.00
Democratic hold			

=== 2002 ===
Illinois's 17th congressional district election, 2004l2
Party	Candidate	Votes	%
Democratic	Lane Evans (incumbent)	127,093	62.42
Republican	Peter Calderone	76,519	37.58
Total votes		203,612	100.00
Democratic hold			

=== 2004 ===
Illinois's 17th congressional district election, 2004
Party	Candidate	Votes	%
Democratic	Lane Evans (incumbent)	172,320	60.68
Republican	Andrea Zinga	111,680	39.32
Total votes		284,000	100.00
Democratic hold			

=== 2006 ===
2006 Illinois's 17th congressional district election
Party	Candidate	Votes	%
Democratic	Phil Hare	115,025	57.17
Republican	Andrea Zinga	86,161	42.83
Total votes		201,186	100.00
Democratic hold			

=== 2008 ===
Illinois's 17th congressional district election, 2008
Party	Candidate	Votes	%
Democratic	Phil Hare (incumbent)	220,961	99.77
Write-ins		517	0.23
Total votes		221,478	100.00
Democratic hold			

=== 2010 ===
Illinois's 17th district general election, November 2, 2010
Party	Candidate	Votes	%
Republican	Bobby Schilling	104,583	52.58
Democratic	Phil Hare (incumbent)	85,454	42.96
Green	Roger K. Davis	8,861	4.46
Total votes		198,898	100.00
Republican gain from Democratic			

=== 2012 ===
Illinois's 17th congressional district election results, 2012
Party	Candidate	Votes	%
Democratic	Cheri Bustos	153,519	53.3
Republican	Bobby Schilling (incumbent)	134,623	46.7
Independent	Eric Reyes (write-in)	10	0.0
Independent	Joe Faber (write-in)	9	0.0
Total votes		288,161	100.0
Democratic gain from Republican			

=== 2014 ===
Illinois's 17th congressional district, 2014
Party	Candidate	Votes	%
Democratic	Cheri Bustos (incumbent)	110,560	55.5
Republican	Bobby Schilling	88,785	44.5
Independent	Bill Fawell (write-in)	16	0.0
Total votes		199,361	100.0
Democratic hold			

=== 2016 ===
Illinois's 17th congressional district, 2016
Party	Candidate	Votes	%
Democratic	Cheri Bustos (incumbent)	173,125	60.3
Republican	Patrick Harlan	113,943	39.7
Total votes		287,068	100.0
Democratic hold			

=== 2018 ===
Illinois's 17th congressional district, 2018
Party	Candidate	Votes	%
Democratic	Cheri Bustos (incumbent)	142,659	62.1
Republican	Bill Fawell	87,090	37.9
Total votes		229,749	100.0
Democratic hold			

=== 2020 ===
Illinois's 17th congressional district, 2020
Party	Candidate	Votes	%
Democratic	Cheri Bustos (incumbent)	156,011	52.02
Republican	Esther Joy King	143,863	47.97
Write-in		21	0.01
Total votes		299,895	100.0
Democratic hold			

=== 2022 ===
Illinois's 17th congressional district, 2022
Party	Candidate	Votes	%
Democratic	Eric Sorensen	121,186	51.98
Republican	Esther Joy King	111,931	48.01
Write-in		6	0.00
Total votes		233,123	100.0
Democratic hold			

=== 2024 ===
Illinois's 17th congressional district, 2024
Party	Candidate	Votes	%	±%
Democratic	Eric Sorensen (incumbent)	170,261	54.43	+2.45%
Republican	Joseph McGraw	142,567	45.57	−2.44%
Total votes		312,828	100.0	
Democratic hold				

== See also ==
- Illinois's congressional districts
- List of United States congressional districts
- Gerrymandering
