= Dunlap Community Unit School District 323 =

School district in Illinois, United States

Address
- 400 South 4th Street Dunlap, Illinois, 61525; United States
- Coordinates: 40°50′N 89°40′W

District information
- Type: Public
- Grades: PreK–12
- Superintendent: Scott Dearman
- NCES District ID: 1712700

Students and staff
- Students: 4,652

Other information
- Website: www.dunlapcusd.net

Dunlap Community Unit School District 323 is a public school district in Peoria County, Illinois. It is based near Dunlap, Illinois, and has one high school, two middle schools, and five elementary schools. Its territory consists of Radnor Township, northeastern Kickapoo Township, the western third of Medina Township, and parts of Akron, Hallock, and Richwoods Townships. It serves the towns of Dunlap and Princeville, the unincorporated communities of Edelstein and Edwards, and the outer northern portions of Peoria.

As of 2017, the district had 4,565 students, and a student-teacher ratio of 20:1 for elementary/middle schools and 21:1 for the high school.

Its mascot is an eagle, typically represented as an American bald eagle.

== Schools ==
- Dunlap High School – High school education in Dunlap started in 1893. The high school got its own building in 1926. It was its own high school district, #158, until District 323 was created. The current high school was built in 1976.

Principal: Katie Cazalet

- Dunlap Middle School This school opened in spring 1999. Additions of the new modular building in 2016 to add more students.

Principal: Antonio Johnson Assistant Principal: Jennifer Wilke

- Dunlap Valley Middle School This school opened in fall 2008. Additions are planned for 2019 to increase the capacity to 700 students.

Principal: Dustin Hess Assistant Principal: Brian Bishop

- Dunlap Grade School – across from the Rock Island Trail in Alta

Principal: Michaela Rychener

- Banner Elementary School – not to be confused with the old District 81 school

Principal: Greg Fairchild

- Ridgeview Elementary School This school opened in fall 2001

Principal: Kyle James Assistant Principal: Kara Chambers

- Wilder-Waite Grade School – This school was opened in autumn 1948 to replace the schools whose five districts had consolidated into new District 303 in 1946.

Principal: Stacy Berg

- Hickory Grove Elementary School This school opened in fall 2012

Principal: Jeremy Entyre Assistant Principal: Cheryl Wooden

== History ==
By 1945, Radnor Township had at least 9 grade school districts; most of these districts, along with a few in nearby townships, merged around 1945–1946. In 1969, District 323 was created by the consolidation of the three remaining districts: Dunlap Township High School District 158, Dunlap Consolidated Grade School District 302, and Wilder-Waite Consolidated Grade School District 303.

=== Dunlap Grade School District 302 ===
Dunlap District #302 traced is lineage back to several school districts.

- Potter School (District #7), was located in Section 35 of Akron Township. The school was built in 1867, west of the Chicago and North Western Railway, and was named after a family who migrated to the area in 1847 and had several generations of students attend the school. The district merged into Dunlap #302 in 1953.
- Summit (#8), was originally represented by Toehead School, built in 1858; this building was sold off and moved to a nearby farm when the new school, named the Summit, was built on the same property in 1883. This district merged into Dunlap #302 in 1954.
- Rice School (#80) was built in 1855. The district was split in 1953 and given to Dunlap #302 (which later consolidated into #323) and Edelstein #313 (which later consolidated into Princeville #326). The Rice School building still exists as a house on Illinois Route 40.
- Banner School (#81) was originally District 3, started around 1844. Medina's District 3 merged with Radnor's District 10, and the new school was built in 1872; the county school superintendent called it a "Banner School" and the name stuck. It was the first school in Peoria County to have single desks. This school closed in 1953 and the district split among Dunlap #302, Wilder-Waite #303, and Mossville #306 (which later consolidated into IVC #321). The school was at the corner of "Dunlap Road" and Illinois 88 (now Illinois 40), and the original bricks from this old Banner School are on display at the new Banner School on Allen Road.
- Keady (#102), consolidated to form Dunlap #302 in 1945.
- Bell Tree (#103), split from Hazel Dell #108 around 1865, then consolidated again with it and others to form Dunlap #302 in 1945.
- Salem (#104), was established around 1849; it moved to a new school in 1868 on the spare ground of the Methodist Church church yard. The school was rebuilt there in 1913 after a fire. It consolidated to form Dunlap #302 in 1945.
- Dunlap (#105) traced its history back to 1841, in the more populated sections south of what is now the village of Dunlap. Three schools were built. When Dunlap itself was laid out in 1871, one of the schools moved to just south of the new village; in 1877, it moved into a building in town owned by Alva Dunlap; and 1899, a newer school was erected. #105 consolidated to form Dunlap #302 in 1945.
- Hazel Dell (#108) had the first building actually built as a school in Radnor Township, built around 1850. Township sections 17, 18, 19, and 20 were in this district. It consolidated to form Dunlap #302 in 1945.
- Parks (#109) (originally Radnor School District #8) was township sections 3, 4, 9, and 10. The school was built in the southwest quarter of section 3, and was named Dunlap School, after Napoleon Dunlap, who donated the land in 1848. There is no record for the date of the first school building, but the second was built in 1875. This school was renamed to Parks School, from a prominent new family in the area, to avoid confusion after the new village of Dunlap got its own school. Around 1945, District #109 was divided between Dunlap District #105 (soon to consolidate into #302) and Akron Township, Peoria County, Illinois's Summit District #8, which itself merged into Dunlap #302 in 1954.

=== Wilder-Waite District 303 ===
Wilder-Waite District 303 was created in 1946 by the consolidation of several school districts. The school itself opened in autumn 1948.

- Orange Prairie (#53) was originally Kickapoo Township District 1; the first school was a log building built in 1840; it was replaced with a brick building in 1876. It was on Illinois Route 91 near U.S. Route 150. Orange Prairie School was one of the District 303 schools that remained open while Wilder-Waite was being built. It has since been demolished.
- An Orange Grange School or Grange Hall was across from Orange Prairie School. It was also one of the District 303 schools that remained open while Wilder-Waite was being built.
- Alta School (#84), originally District 6, was originally built around 1858. The new school was built in the summer of 1877 in the then-new town of Alta. The school burnt down in 1945; the students completed the year in the Alta Masonic hall, and then went to other schools when the district consolidated into #303 at the end of the year.
- Glendale School (#106), Alta, had a history back to 1849. It was one of the District 303 schools that remained open while Wilder-Waite was being built.
- Tucker School (#107), Edwards, was established in 1855, but with education traceable back to 1840; there was a District 9 that merged into it in 1858.
- Dewey School (#110), township section 34, had a history back to 1856 and was known as District 9 until 1903. Its first school, built in 1856, was known as the British Institute. Dewey School was built in 1898, and named after General George Dewey from the Spanish–American War.
- Richwoods School (#116) was in the northwest corner of Richwoods Township. Its first building was a log school; the second was built in 1860 on the south side of the road, east of the original school; when it burnt down 1906, a third school was built. The final school was at the corner of what is now University Street and Pioneer Parkway (former Illinois Route 174). The school was dormant for six years starting in 1912 due to lack of students, but re-opened in spring 1918 and continued from then until 1946. The district consolidated into Wilder-Waite #303 in 1946. The school building itself was moved down University Street, where it was used as a house for a few years until it burnt down. The district's former territory was gradually transferred into Peoria District 150 over the years as the city of Peoria grew.
