= Illinois Route 90 =

Highway in Peoria County, Illinois

Illinois Route 90
- IL 90 highlighted in red

Route information
- Maintained by IDOT
- Length: 15.80 mi (25.43 km)
- Existed: 1924–present

Major junctions
- West end: IL 78 near Laura
- East end: IL 40 / CR D19 near Edelstein

Location
- Country: United States
- State: Illinois
- Counties: Peoria

Highway system
- Illinois State Highway System; Interstate; US; State; Tollways; Scenic
← I-90	→ IL 91

Illinois Route 90 (IL 90) is an east–west state highway in northern Peoria County in central Illinois. It runs from IL 78 north of Laura to IL 40 south of Edelstein. This is a distance of 15.80 miles (25.43 km).

== Route description ==
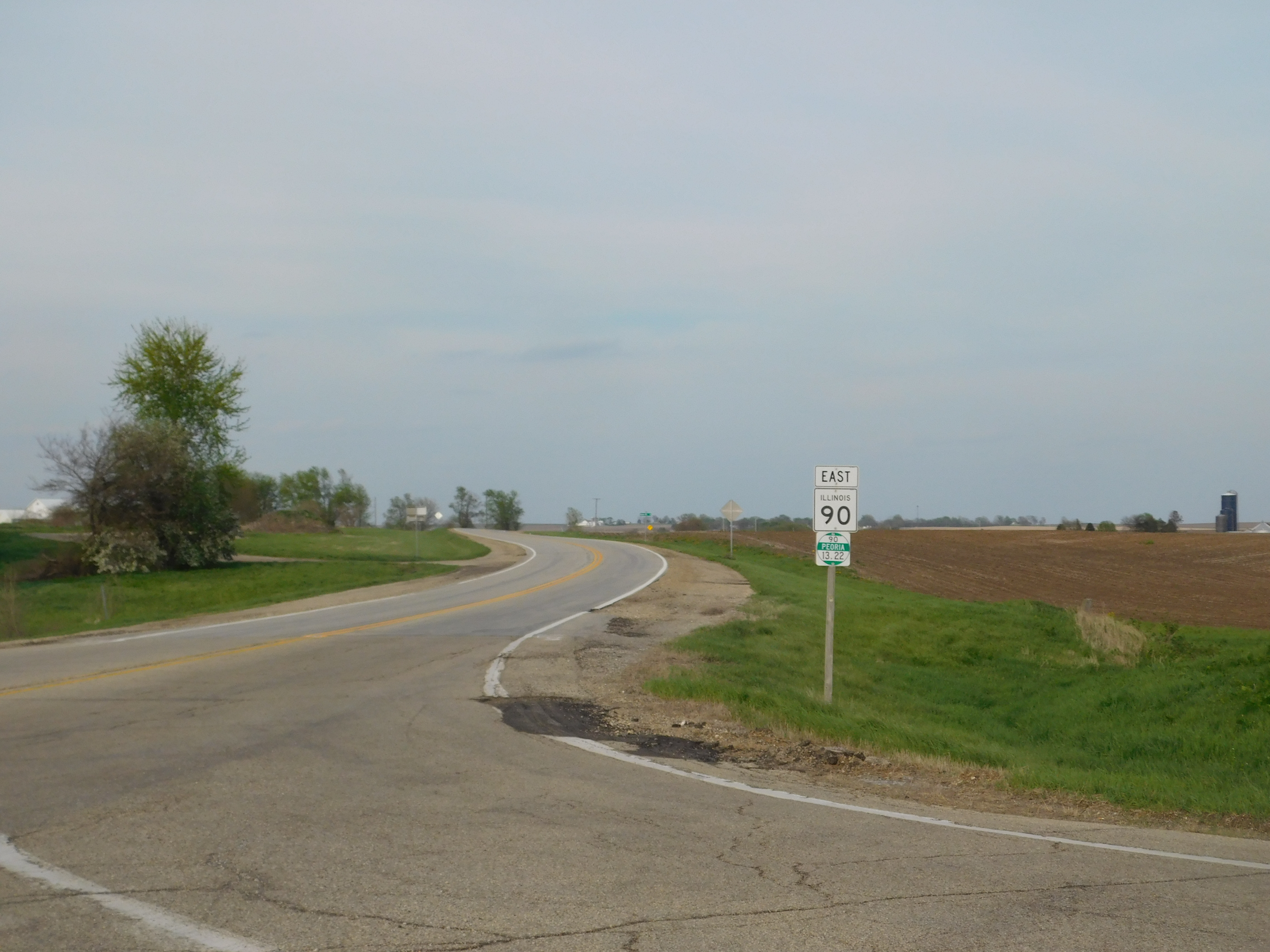
IL 90 east of IL 91

IL 90 is an undivided two-lane surface road for its entire length. It passes north of the community of Monica and through the village of Princeville. While in Princeville, IL 90 runs concurrent with IL 91 from Princeville east for 4 miles (6.4 km).

== History ==
SBI Route 90 ran from Laura in Peoria County to Sparland in Marshall County along current Illinois 90, IL 17 and IL 40. This was changed to its current alignment in 1938.

== Major intersections ==
The entire route is in Peoria County.

Location	mi	km	Destinations	Notes
Millbrook Township	0.00	0.00	IL 78 / Nightengale Road – Kewanee, Canton	Western terminus
Princeville	8.91	14.34	IL 91 north (Santa Fe Avenue) – Wyoming	Western end of IL 91 concurrency
Akron Township	13.22	21.28	IL 91 south – Dunlap	Eastern end of IL 91 concurrency
Hallock Township	15.80	25.43	IL 40 – Bradford, Peoria CR D19 east (Truitt Road) – Chillicothe	Eastern terminus; roadway continues as CR D19 east
1.000 mi = 1.609 km; 1.000 km = 0.621 mi: Concurrency terminus
