= Trivoli Township =

Trivoli Township may refer to the following townships in the United States:

- Trivoli Township, Peoria County, Illinois
- Trivoli Township, Ellsworth County, Kansas
