= Brimfield Township =

Brimfield Township may refer to the following townships in the United States:

- Brimfield Township, Peoria County, Illinois
- Brimfield Township, Ohio
