= Dunlap High School (disambiguation) =

Dunlap High School may refer to:

- Dunlap High School — the high school of Dunlap Community Unit School District 323 in Dunlap, Peoria County, Illinois
- Dunlap High School (Iowa) — a former high school in Dunlap, Iowa that merged to form Boyer Valley High School between 1989 and 1994
- Pennfield-Dunlap High School — a former high school in Battle Creek, Michigan
- Dunlap High School (Virginia) — a former high school in Alleghany County, Virginia
