= Mount Hawley Auxiliary Airport =

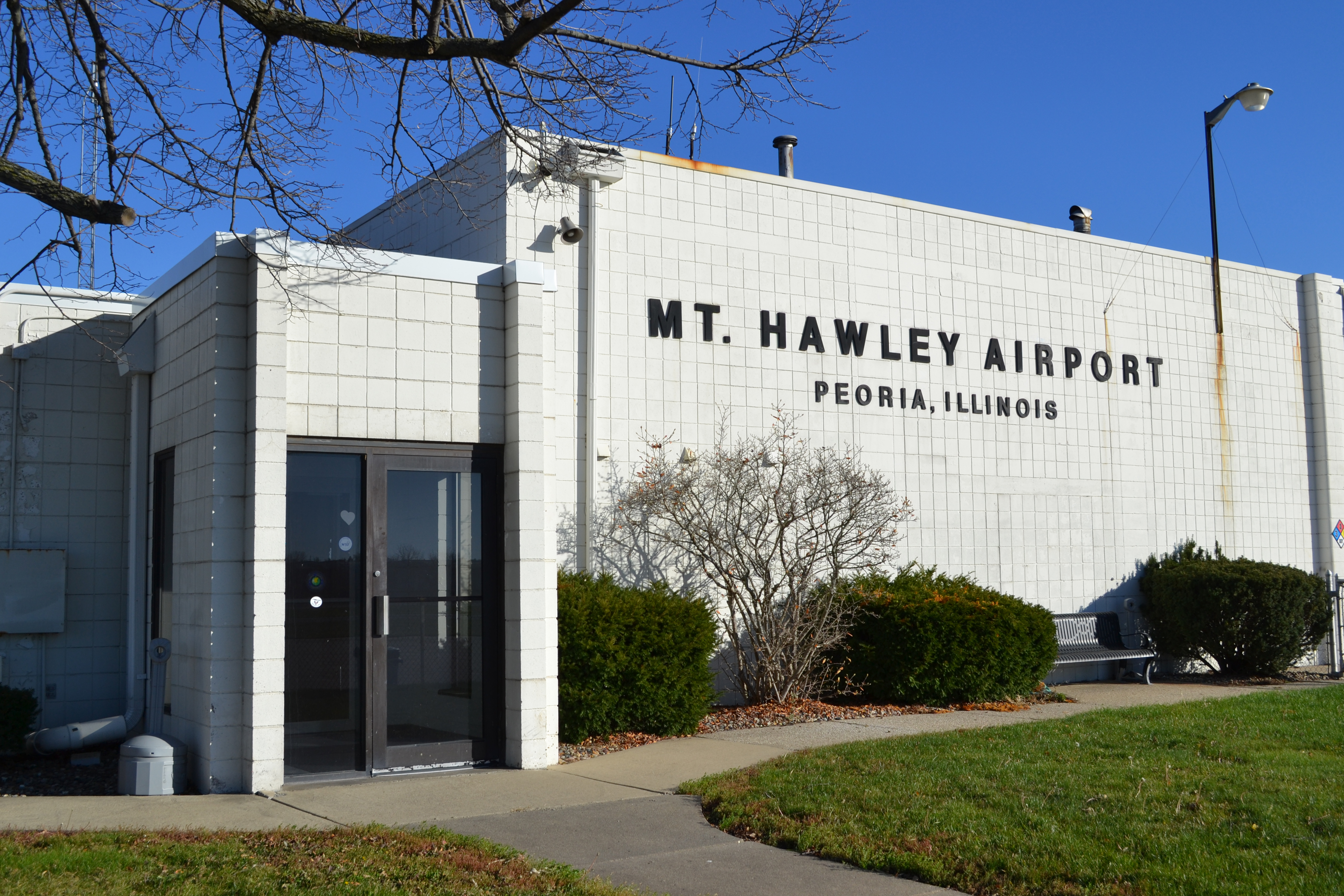
- Mt Hawley Airport in Peoria
- IATA: none; ICAO: none; FAA LID: 3MY

Summary
- Airport type: Public
- Owner: Greater Peoria Airport Authority
- Serves: Peoria, Illinois
- Time zone: UTC−06:00 (-6)
  - Summer (DST): UTC−05:00 (-5)
- Elevation AMSL: 786 ft / 240 m
- Coordinates: 40°47′43″N 89°36′48″W

Maps
- Location of Peoria County in Illinois

- Location of airport in Peoria County

Runways
Direction	Length		Surface
Direction	ft	m	Surface
18/36	4,000	1,219	Asphalt

Statistics (2008)
- Aircraft operations: 21,000
- Based aircraft: 45
- Source: Federal Aviation Administration

Mount Hawley Auxiliary Airport (FAA LID: 3MY) is a public use airport located seven nautical miles (13 km) north of the central business district of Peoria, a city in Peoria County, Illinois, United States. It is owned by the Greater Peoria Airport Authority. According to the FAA's National Plan of Integrated Airport Systems for 2009–2013, it is categorized as a general aviation facility.

== Facilities and aircraft ==
Mount Hawley Auxiliary Airport covers an area of 84 acres (34 ha) at an elevation of 786 feet (240 m) above mean sea level. It has one runway designated 18/36 with an asphalt surface measuring 4,000 by 60 feet (1,219 x 18 m).

The runway was lengthened from 3,600' to 4,000' in 2012, though there was desire to lengthen it further and widen it by 15 feet with the desire of attracting a wider array of aircraft. An additional $159,000 in funding was released to the airport in 2021 as part of the Bipartisan Infrastructure Bill.

The airport is served by an fixed-base operator. Besides fuel, the FBO offers catering, a lounge, refreshments, supplies, a weather briefing station, and a courtesy car.

For the 12-month period ending April 30, 2020, the airport had 21,000 aircraft operations, an average of 57 per day: 99% general aviation and 1% air taxi. At that time, there were 51 aircraft based at this airport: 45 single-engine and 6 multi-engine airplanes.

== Ground transportation ==
While no public transit service is provided directly to the airport, Greater Peoria Mass Transit District provides bus service nearby.

== See also ==
- List of airports in Illinois
