= Illinois Route 91 =

State highway in central Illinois, US

Illinois Route 91

Route information
- Maintained by IDOT
- Length: 40.72 mi (65.53 km)
- Existed: 1941–present
- History: Signed as IL 30 before 1941

Major junctions
- South end: US 150 in Peoria
- North end: US 34 / IL 78 in Kewanee

Location
- Country: United States
- State: Illinois
- Counties: Peoria, Stark, Henry

Highway system
- Illinois State Highway System; Interstate; US; State; Tollways; Scenic
← IL 90	→ IL 92
← US 30	IL 30	→ IL 31

Illinois Route 91 (IL 91) is a rural state route in central Illinois. It runs from the northwest edge of Peoria at U.S. Highway 150 (US 150) to U.S. Highway 34 and Illinois Route 78 south of Kewanee. Illinois 91 is 40.72 miles (65.53 km) long.

== Route description ==
IL 91 serves the cities of Toulon, Wyoming, Princeville, and Dunlap. It travels concurrently with IL 90 around Princeville.

IL 91 does not travel in a straight line between any two major towns. IL 91's endpoints are generally northwest-to-southeast, but the route consists entirely of north–south and east–west stretches.

The Rock Island Trail State Park follows IL 91 for much of its length. This State Park trail is the former right-of-way of a Peoria branch line of the Chicago, Rock Island and Pacific Railroad.

== History ==
SBI Route 91 was the current U.S. Route 150 from Knoxville to Peoria. Prior to 1936, Illinois Route 30 mostly followed present-day IL 91 and a part of IL 17 east of Galva. Later, IL 30 was rerouted north of Toulon which entirely followed current IL 91. In March 1941, the state announced that IL 91 was replacing the designation of IL 30 from Kewanee to US 150, and has remained so to this day.

== Major intersections ==
County	Location	mi	km	Destinations	Notes
Peoria	Peoria	0.0	0.0	US 150 (War Memorial Drive) – Peoria, Galesburg	
Peoria		10.7	17.2	IL 90 east	South end of IL 90 concurrency
Peoria	Princeville	15.0	24.1	IL 90 west (Spring Street)	North end of IL 90 concurrency
Stark	Wyoming	25.5	41.0	IL 17 east (7th Street)	South end of IL 17 concurrency
Stark	Toulon	31.5	50.7	IL 17 west (Main Street)	North end of IL 17 concurrency
Stark		37.3	60.0	IL 93 east	
Henry	Kewanee	40.72	65.53	US 34 / IL 78 – Galva, Canton, Kewanee	
1.000 mi = 1.609 km; 1.000 km = 0.621 mi: Concurrency terminus
