= Limestone Township, Peoria County, Illinois =

Coordinates: 40°40′23″N 89°42′08″W

LimestoneTownship
- Township
- Flag Seal

- Location in Peoria County

- Peoria County's location in Illinois
- Country: United States
- State: Illinois
- County: Peoria
- Established: November 6, 1849

Area
  - Total: 35.95 sq mi (93.1 km^{2})
  - Land: 35.7 sq mi (92 km^{2})
  - Water: 0.26 sq mi (0.67 km^{2}) 0.72%

Population (2010)
  - Estimate (2016): 19,236
  - Density: 552/sq mi (213/km^{2})
- Time zone: UTC-6 (CST)
  - Summer (DST): UTC-5 (CDT)
- FIPS code: 17-143-43523
- Website: www.limestonetownship.org

Limestone Township is located in Peoria County, Illinois. As of the 2020 census, its population was 18,357 and it contained 8,111 housing units.

For the census year of 2010, its population was 19,705 and it contained 8,103 housing units.

== History ==
Limestone Township was named from the abundance of limestone and attendant lime kilns in the area. After the dissolution of neighboring West Peoria Township, portions of the township outside of the City of West Peoria's corporate boundaries were absorbed into Limestone Township.

== Geography ==
According to the 2010 census, the township has a total area of 35.95 square miles (93.1 km^{2}), of which 35.7 square miles (92 km^{2}) (or 99.30%) is land and 0.26 square miles (0.67 km^{2}) (or 0.72%) is water.

=== Cities ===
- Bartonville (vast majority)
- Bellevue
- Norwood
- Peoria (small portion)
- West Peoria (partial)

=== Other Community ===
- Lake Camelot (east three fifths)

== Demographics ==
Historical population
| Census | Pop. | Note | %± |
|---|---|---|---|
| 2016 (est.) | 19,236 |
U.S. Decennial Census
