= Hollis Township, Peoria County, Illinois =

Coordinates: 40°35′16″N 89°42′13″W

Hollis Township
- Township
- Location in Peoria County

- Peoria County's location in Illinois
- Country: United States
- State: Illinois
- County: Peoria
- Established: November 6, 1849
- Named for: Denzil Hollis

Government
  - Supervisor: Gary Thomas
  - Clerk: Roger Hostetter, Sr.
  - Assessor: Debra Emert
  - Road Commissioner: Dennis Beckman

Area
  - Total: 25.11 sq mi (65.0 km^{2})
  - Land: 23.97 sq mi (62.1 km^{2})
  - Water: 1.13 sq mi (2.9 km^{2}) 4.50%

Population (2010)
  - Estimate (2016): 1,881
  - Density: 78.5/sq mi (30.3/km^{2})
- Time zone: UTC-6 (CST)
  - Summer (DST): UTC-5 (CDT)
- FIPS code: 17-143-35645
- Website: http://www.hollistownship.org

Hollis Township is located in Peoria County, Illinois. As of the 2010 census, its population was 1,881 and it contained 768 housing units. The village of Mapleton is the only incorporated town in the township.

== Geography ==
According to the 2010 census, the township has a total area of 25.11 square miles (65.0 km^{2}), of which 23.97 square miles (62.1 km^{2}) (or 95.46%) is land and 1.13 square miles (2.9 km^{2}) (or 4.50%) is water.

== Demographics ==
Historical population
Census	Pop.	Note	%±
2016 (est.)	1,881
U.S. Decennial Census
