= Kingston Mines, Illinois =

Kingston Mines
- Village
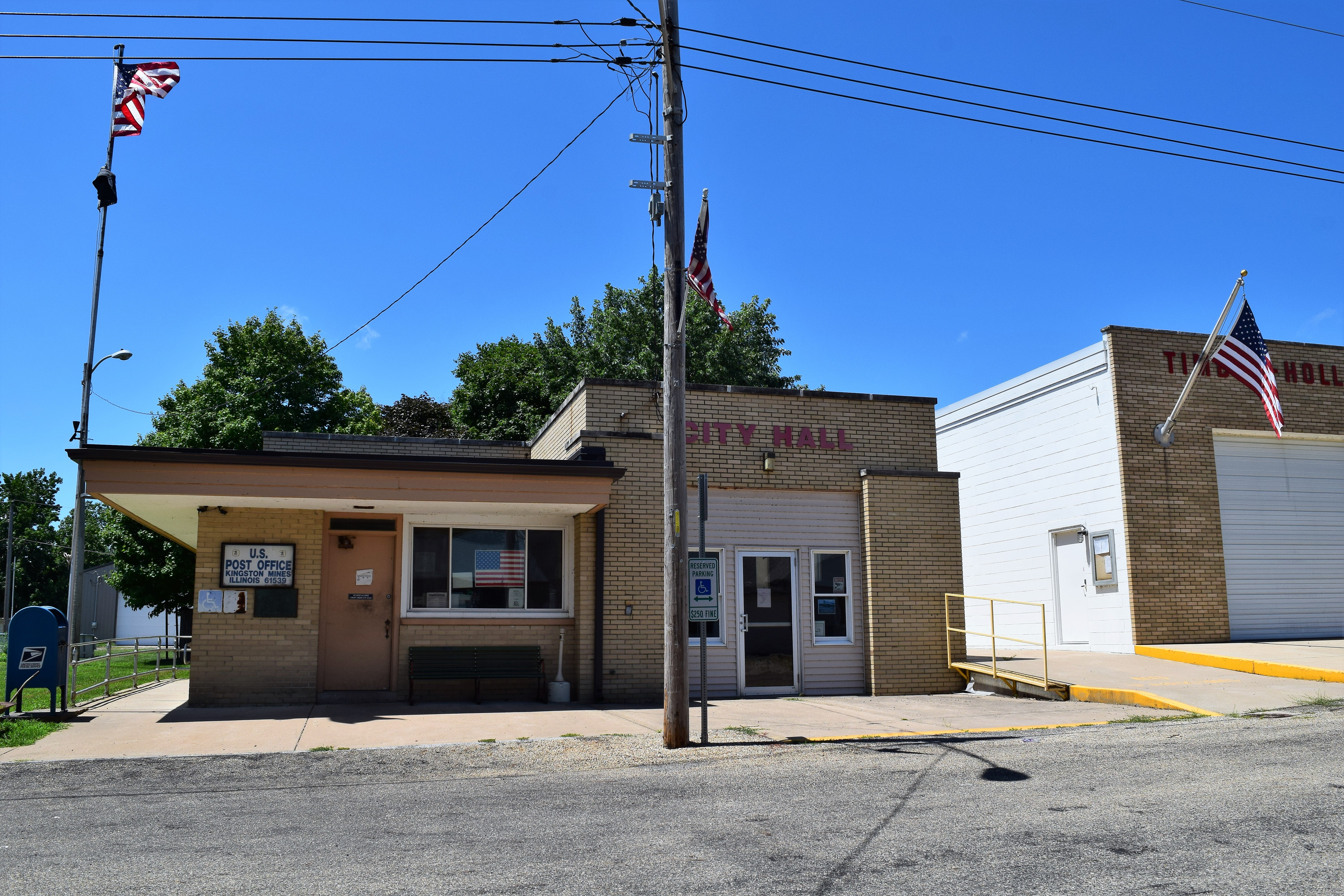
- Kingston Mines post office and city hall

- Location of Kingston Mines in Peoria County, Illinois.
- Coordinates: 40°33′31″N 89°46′19″W
- Country: United States
- State: Illinois
- County: Peoria

Area
  - Total: 1.59 sq mi (4.11 km^{2})
  - Land: 1.44 sq mi (3.74 km^{2})
  - Water: 0.14 sq mi (0.37 km^{2})
- Elevation: 479 ft (146 m)

Population (2020)
  - Total: 266
  - Density: 184.2/sq mi (71.11/km^{2})
- Time zone: UTC-6 (CST)
  - Summer (DST): UTC-5 (CDT)
- ZIP code: 61539
- Area code: 309
- FIPS code: 17-40091
- GNIS feature ID: 2398355
- Website: villageofkingstonmines.org

Kingston Mines is a village in Peoria County, Illinois, United States. As of the 2020 census, Kingston Mines had a population of 266. It is part of the Peoria, Illinois Metropolitan Statistical Area. Located on the Illinois River, it was a shipping port, loading coal from the nearby mines (the largest nearby mine was called Kingston).

== History ==
In the early 20th century, an archeological site of an indigenous village on the north shore of Kingston Lake, Illinois River was destroyed by the Kingston Lake Gravel Company. The Peoria Academy of Science performed some fieldwork in the 1930s.

The original post office and village hall were constructed circa 1880. These facilities were rebuilt in 1953.

== Geography ==
Kingston Mines is located in the southwestern corner of Timber Township, mostly within the bounds of quarter sections 25 and 26.

According to the 2010 census, Kingston Mines has a total area of 1.528 square miles (3.96 km^{2}), of which 1.38 square miles (3.57 km^{2}) (or 90.31%) is land and 0.148 square miles (0.38 km^{2}) (or 9.69%) is water.

== Demographics ==
Historical population
Census	Pop.	Note	%±
1900	509		—
1910	492		−3.3%
1920	360		−26.8%
1930	326		−9.4%
1940	390		19.6%
1950	404		3.6%
1960	375		−7.2%
1970	380		1.3%
1980	340		−10.5%
1990	293		−13.8%
2000	259		−11.6%
2010	302		16.6%
2020	266		−11.9%
U.S. Decennial Census

As of the census of 2000, there were 259 people, 98 households, and 68 families residing in the village. The population density was 193.2 inhabitants per square mile (74.6/km^{2}). There were 105 housing units at an average density of 78.3 per square mile (30.2/km^{2}). The racial makeup of the village was 95.75% White, 2.32% from other races, and 1.93% from two or more races. Hispanic or Latino of any race were 3.09% of the population.

There were 98 households, out of which 29.6% had children under the age of 18 living with them, 56.1% were married couples living together, 11.2% had a female householder with no husband present, and 29.6% were non-families. 26.5% of all households were made up of individuals, and 14.3% had someone living alone who was 65 years of age or older. The average household size was 2.64 and the average family size was 3.20.

In the village, the population was spread out, with 23.2% under the age of 18, 12.4% from 18 to 24, 27.4% from 25 to 44, 21.2% from 45 to 64, and 15.8% who were 65 years of age or older. The median age was 35 years. For every 100 females, there were 105.6 males. For every 100 females age 18 and over, there were 101.0 males.

The median income for a household in the village was $31,250, and the median income for a family was $45,556. Males had a median income of $26,000 versus $21,875 for females. The per capita income for the village was $14,908. About 2.9% of families and 5.2% of the population were below the poverty line, including 7.8% of those under the age of eighteen and none of those 65 or over.
