= Peoria County, Illinois =

County in Illinois, United States

- County
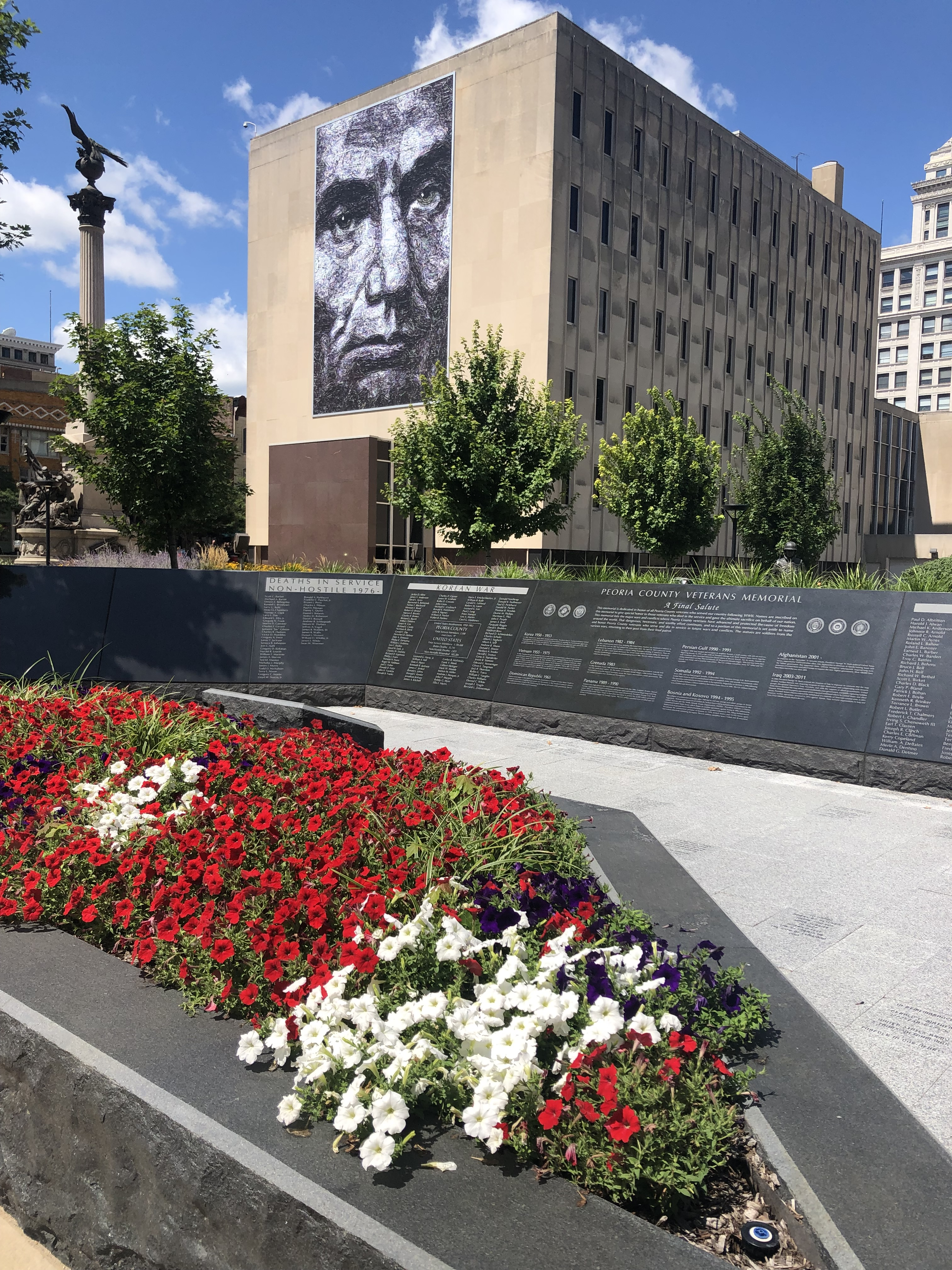
- Peoria County Courthouse

- Flag Seal

- Location within the U.S. state of Illinois
- Coordinates: 40.79°N 89.76°W
- Country: United States
- State: Illinois
- Founded: 1825
- Named for: Peoria tribe
- Seat: Peoria
- Largest city: Peoria

Area
  - Total: 631 sq mi (1,630 km^{2})
  - Land: 619 sq mi (1,600 km^{2})
  - Water: 11 sq mi (28 km^{2}) 1.8%

Population (2020)
  - Total: 181,830
  - Estimate (2025): 178,553 ▼
  - Density: 294/sq mi (113/km^{2})
- Time zone: UTC−6 (Central)
  - Summer (DST): UTC−5 (CDT)
- ZIP Codes: 61451, 61517, 61523, 61525, 61526, 61528, 61529, 61531, 61533, 61536, 61539, 61547, 61552, 61559, 61562, 61569, 61601, 61602, 61603, 61604, 61605, 61606, 61607, 61612, 61613, 61614, 61615, 61616, 61625, 61629, 61630, 61633, 61634, 61636, 61637, 61638, 61639, 61641, 61643, 61650, 61651, 61652, 61653, 61654, 61655, 61656
- Congressional districts: 16th, 17th
- Website: www.peoriacounty.gov

Peoria County is located in the U.S. state of Illinois. The 2020 United States census listed its population at 181,830. Its county seat is Peoria. Peoria County is part of the Peoria metropolitan area.

== History ==
Peoria County was formed in 1825 out of Fulton County. It was named for the Peoria, an Illiniwek people who lived there. It included most of the western valley of the Illinois River up to the Chicago river portage.

== Geography ==
According to the US Census Bureau, the county has a total area of 631 square miles (1,630 km^{2}), of which 619 square miles (1,600 km^{2}) is land and 11 square miles (28 km^{2}) (1.8%) is water. The county is drained by Spoon River, Kickapoo Creek, Elbow Creek, and Copperas Creek.

=== Climate and weather ===
Peoria, Illinois

Climate chart (precipitation, max. and min. temperature)
J	F	M	A	M	J	J	A	S	O	N	D
1.5 31 14	1.7 37 20	2.8 49 30	3.6 62 40	4.2 73 51	3.8 82 60	4 86 65	3.2 84 63	3.1 77 54	2.8 64 42	3 49 31	2.4 35 20
- █ Average max. and min. temperatures in °F
- █ Precipitation totals in inches
- Source: The Weather Channel
Metric conversion
J	F	M	A	M	J	J	A	S	O	N	D
38 −1 −10	42 3 −7	72 9 −1	90 17 4	106 23 11	98 28 16	102 30 18	80 29 17	79 25 12	70 18 6	76 9 −1	61 2 −7
- █ Average max. and min. temperatures in °C
- █ Precipitation totals in mm

In recent years, average temperatures in the county seat of Peoria have ranged from a low of 14 °F (−10 °C) in January to a high of 86 °F (30 °C) in July, although a record low of −27 °F (−33 °C) was recorded in January 1884 and a record high of 113 °F (45 °C) was recorded in July 1936. Average monthly precipitation ranged from 1.50 inches (38 mm) in January to 4.17 inches (106 mm) in May.

=== Adjacent counties ===
- Knox County – northwest
- Stark County – north
- Marshall County – northeast
- Woodford County – east
- Tazewell County – south
- Fulton County – southwest

== Transportation ==
=== Transit ===
- Greater Peoria Mass Transit District

=== Major highways ===
- Interstate 74
- Interstate 474
- U.S. Route 24
- U.S. Route 150
- Illinois Route 6
- Illinois Route 8
- Illinois Route 9
- Illinois Route 29
- Illinois Route 40
- Illinois Route 78
- Illinois Route 90
- Illinois Route 91
- Illinois Route 116

=== Defunct highways ===
- Illinois Route 174
- Illinois Route 175

=== Airports ===
- General Wayne A. Downing Peoria International Airport (PIA), formerly Greater Peoria Regional Airport
- Mount Hawley Auxiliary Airport (3MY) – Peoria, Illinois

== Demographics ==
Historical population
Census	Pop.	Note	%±
1840	6,153		—
1850	17,547		185.2%
1860	36,601		108.6%
1870	47,540		29.9%
1880	55,355		16.4%
1890	70,378		27.1%
1900	88,608		25.9%
1910	100,255		13.1%
1920	111,710		11.4%
1930	141,344		26.5%
1940	153,374		8.5%
1950	174,347		13.7%
1960	189,044		8.4%
1970	195,318		3.3%
1980	200,466		2.6%
1990	182,827		−8.8%
2000	183,433		0.3%
2010	186,494		1.7%
2020	181,830		−2.5%
2025 (est.)	178,553	▼	−1.8%
US Decennial Census; 1790–1960 1900–1990; 1990–2000 2010–2019

=== 2020 census ===
As of the 2020 census, the county had a population of 181,830. The median age was 38.5 years; 23.2% of residents were under the age of 18 and 17.9% of residents were 65 years of age or older. For every 100 females there were 95.4 males, and for every 100 females age 18 and over there were 92.2 males age 18 and over.

The racial makeup of the county was 67.4% White, 18.7% Black or African American, 0.3% American Indian and Alaska Native, 4.3% Asian, <0.1% Native Hawaiian and Pacific Islander, 2.8% from some other race, and 6.5% from two or more races. Hispanic or Latino residents of any race comprised 5.5% of the population.

83.1% of residents lived in urban areas, while 16.9% lived in rural areas.

There were 75,808 households in the county, of which 28.1% had children under the age of 18 living in them. Of all households, 40.9% were married-couple households, 21.0% were households with a male householder and no spouse or partner present, and 31.1% were households with a female householder and no spouse or partner present. About 33.8% of all households were made up of individuals and 12.8% had someone living alone who was 65 years of age or older.

There were 85,074 housing units, of which 10.9% were vacant. Among occupied housing units, 63.3% were owner-occupied and 36.7% were renter-occupied. The homeowner vacancy rate was 2.8% and the rental vacancy rate was 12.5%.

=== Racial and ethnic composition ===
Peoria County, Illinois – Racial and ethnic composition Note: the US Census treats Hispanic/Latino as an ethnic category. This table excludes Latinos from the racial categories and assigns them to a separate category. Hispanics/Latinos may be of any race.
Race / Ethnicity (NH = Non-Hispanic)	Pop 1980	Pop 1990	Pop 2000	Pop 2010	Pop 2020	% 1980	% 1990	% 2000	% 2010	% 2020
White alone (NH)	174,586	152,801	143,932	135,620	120,629	87.09%	83.58%	78.47%	72.72%	66.34%
Black or African American alone (NH)	21,349	24,746	29,320	32,720	33,635	10.65%	13.54%	15.98%	17.54%	18.50%
Native American or Alaska Native alone (NH)	275	303	365	373	342	0.14%	0.17%	0.20%	0.20%	0.19%
Asian alone (NH)	1,322	2,193	3,010	5,819	7,730	0.66%	1.20%	1.64%	3.12%	4.25%
Native Hawaiian or Pacific Islander alone (NH)	x	x	39	59	61	x	x	0.02%	0.03%	0.03%
Other race alone (NH)	462	188	288	314	783	0.23%	0.10%	0.16%	0.17%	0.43%
Mixed race or Multiracial (NH)	x	x	2,652	4,487	8,559	x	x	1.45%	2.41%	4.71%
Hispanic or Latino (any race)	2,472	2,596	3,827	7,102	10,091	1.23%	1.42%	2.09%	3.81%	5.55%
Total	200,466	182,827	183,433	186,494	181,830	100.00%	100.00%	100.00%	100.00%	100.00%

=== 2010 census ===
In terms of ancestry, per the 2010 US Census, 28.3% were German, 14.8% were Irish, 10.4% were English, and 5.5% were American.

Of the 75,793 households, 30.5% had children under the age of 18 living with them, 44.1% were married couples living together, 14.1% had a female householder with no husband present, 37.7% were non-families, and 31.0% of all households were made up of individuals. The average household size was 2.39 and the average family size was 3.00. The median age was 36.8 years.

The median income for a household in the county was $49,747 and the median income for a family was $63,163. Males had a median income of $51,246 versus $32,881 for females. The per capita income for the county was $28,157. About 10.3% of families and 14.5% of the population were below the poverty line, including 21.8% of those under age 18 and 7.8% of those age 65 or over.

== Points of interest ==
- Glasford crater
- Jubilee College State Park
- WMBD World's Most Beautiful Drive (Grandview Drive/Prospect)
- Forest Park Nature Center
- Peoria Heights Tower Park
- Rock Island Trail

== Communities ==
=== Cities ===
- Chillicothe
- Elmwood
- Farmington (part)
- Pekin (part)
- Peoria (seat)
- West Peoria

=== Villages ===
- Bartonville
- Bellevue
- Brimfield
- Dunlap
- Glasford
- Hanna City
- Kingston Mines
- Mapleton
- Norwood
- Peoria Heights
- Princeville

=== Census-designated places ===
- Lake Camelot
- Mossville
- Rome
- Smithville
- Trivoli

=== Unincorporated communities ===
- Edelstein
- Edwards
- Kickapoo
- Laura
- Mossville

=== Townships ===
The cities of Peoria and West Peoria are considered independent from all of the townships within this county.

- Akron
- Brimfield
- Chillicothe
- Elmwood
- Hallock
- Hollis
- Jubilee
- Kickapoo
- Limestone
- Logan
- Medina
- Millbrook
- Peoria City
- Princeville
- Radnor
- Richwoods
- Rosefield
- Timber
- Trivoli
- West Peoria (former, now defunct and majority part of West Peoria and south segment ceded to Limestone Township)

== Notable residents ==
People from Peoria County other than in the city of Peoria:

- Chris Brackett, host of Arrow Affliction on The Sportsman Channel
- Mike Dunne, pitcher for several Major League Baseball teams
- Mary Emma Holmes (1839-1937), reformer, suffragist, and educator
- Bill Krieg, Major League Baseball player
- Lance (Henry) LeGault, TV and movie actor: Colonel Roderick Decker on The A-Team
- Zach McAllister, Major League Baseball player: Cleveland Indians pitcher
- Johnston McCulley, pulp fiction author: creator of Zorro
- Richard Pryor, Actor, Comedian
- David Ogden Stiers, actor, Major Charles Emerson Winchester III on M*A*S*H
- Josh Taylor, TV actor: Chris Kostichek on the soap opera Days of Our Lives
- Jim Thome, first baseman for several Major League Baseball teams

== Government ==
Peoria County is governed by an 18-member County Board which meets on the second Thursday of each month. Each member represents a district with roughly 10,000 residents.

District	Board Member	Residence	In office since	Party
1	Sharon K. Williams	Peoria	2012	Democratic
2	Camille Coates	Peoria	2022	Democratic
3	Betty Duncan	Peoria	2020	Democratic
4	Brandy Bryant	Peoria	2019	Democratic
5	James C. Dillon (Chair)	West Peoria	2006	Democratic
6	Eden Blair, Ph.D.	Peoria	2019	Democratic
7	Phillip Salzer	Peoria	2000	Democratic
8	Marsha McCann	Peoria	2024	Democratic
9	Danny Phelan	Peoria Heights	2022	Democratic
10	Rob Reneau	Peoria	2018	Democratic
11	Linda E. Daley	Peoria	2019	Republican
12	Daniel Kelch	Edwards	2022	Republican
13	Terry Ruthland	Chillicothe	2022	Republican
14	Brian Elsasser	Princeville	1998	Republican
15	Steven B. Rieker	Peoria	2016	Republican
16	Matt Windish	Brimfield	2018	Republican
17	Jennifer Groves Allison	Peoria	2019	Democratic
18	Paul Rosenbohm	Peoria	2010	Republican

The County also elects a Circuit Clerk, Coroner, County Clerk, Sheriff, State's Attorney, Regional Superintendent (of Education), and Treasurer to four-year terms. The elected Auditor position was eliminated by public referendum in 2022.

Office	Current Holder	In office since	Party
Circuit Clerk	Bobby Spears	2002	Democratic
Coroner	Jamie Harwood	2016	Democratic
County Clerk	Rachael Parker	2019	Democratic
Sheriff	Chris Watkins	2022	Republican
State's Attorney	Jodi Hoos	2019	Democratic
Regional Superintendent	George McKenna, Ph.D.	2024	Democratic
Treasurer	Branden Martin	2024	Republican

== Politics ==
United States presidential election results for Peoria County, Illinois
Year	Republican		Democratic		Third party(ies)	
Year	No.	%	No.	%	No.	%
1892	7,266	45.63%	8,053	50.57%	605	3.80%
1896	10,486	52.70%	9,068	45.57%	344	1.73%
1900	10,700	51.82%	9,433	45.69%	514	2.49%
1904	11,868	62.02%	5,697	29.77%	1,570	8.20%
1908	10,828	52.47%	8,898	43.12%	909	4.41%
1912	9,229	41.91%	8,364	37.98%	4,427	20.10%
1916	18,615	48.38%	18,718	48.65%	1,145	2.98%
1920	24,541	66.00%	9,453	25.42%	3,188	8.57%
1924	25,243	58.55%	6,343	14.71%	11,526	26.74%
1928	31,024	56.50%	23,150	42.16%	739	1.35%
1932	25,166	39.50%	37,605	59.02%	945	1.48%
1936	25,425	33.96%	48,063	64.20%	1,377	1.84%
1940	34,911	45.21%	42,009	54.40%	301	0.39%
1944	34,171	50.81%	32,837	48.83%	243	0.36%
1948	35,018	52.78%	31,026	46.76%	308	0.46%
1952	49,245	59.09%	33,955	40.74%	139	0.17%
1956	50,888	62.72%	30,145	37.15%	108	0.13%
1960	45,529	53.77%	39,061	46.13%	86	0.10%
1964	33,327	41.30%	47,360	58.70%	0	0.00%
1968	37,021	49.96%	30,937	41.75%	6,147	8.29%
1972	50,324	64.49%	27,264	34.94%	444	0.57%
1976	46,526	56.65%	34,606	42.14%	991	1.21%
1980	47,815	57.26%	28,276	33.86%	7,419	8.88%
1984	45,607	55.02%	36,830	44.43%	462	0.56%
1988	37,605	51.35%	35,253	48.14%	372	0.51%
1992	30,718	37.77%	38,099	46.85%	12,511	15.38%
1996	30,990	41.82%	37,383	50.45%	5,729	7.73%
2000	36,398	47.39%	38,604	50.26%	1,810	2.36%
2004	41,051	49.60%	41,121	49.68%	599	0.72%
2008	34,579	42.32%	45,906	56.19%	1,219	1.49%
2012	36,774	46.90%	40,209	51.28%	1,428	1.82%
2016	35,633	45.05%	38,060	48.12%	5,409	6.84%
2020	38,252	45.55%	43,578	51.90%	2,143	2.55%
2024	36,896	46.28%	40,564	50.88%	2,262	2.84%

Prior to 1992, Peoria County, like most of central Illinois, was overwhelmingly Republican. Usually, it only voted for Democratic Party presidential candidates when they won nationally by a landslide. It began trending away from the GOP in the mid-1980s, as evidenced when Ronald Reagan only carried it with 55 percent of the vote in 1984 even as he was winning reelection in a landslide nationally.

From 1992 onward, the county has backed the Democratic candidate in every presidential election, though never by a margin greater than 10 percent aside from 2008 when Illinoisan Barack Obama won it by nearly 14 points. This relative closeness in results was most evident in 2004 when the county backed John Kerry over George W. Bush by only 70 votes.

In Congress, Peoria County is represented by Democrat Eric Sorensen of Illinois's 17th congressional district and Republican Darin LaHood of the Illinois's 18th congressional district.

In the Illinois Senate, Peoria County is represented by Republican Win Stoller of the 37th Legislative District and Democrat Dave Koehler of the 46th Legislative District. In the Illinois House of Representatives, Peoria County is represented by Republican Ryan Spain of the 73rd Representative District, Republican Travis Weaver of the 91st Representative District and Democrat Jehan Gordon-Booth of the 92nd Representative District.

== Education ==
K-12 school districts include:

- Brimfield Community Unit School District 309
- Dunlap Community Unit School District 323
- Elmwood Community Unit School District 322
- Farmington Central Community Unit School District 265
- Illini Bluffs Community Unit School District 327
- Illinois Valley Central Unit School District 321
- Peoria School District 150
- Peoria Heights Community Unit School District 325
- Princeville Community Unit School District 326
- Stark County Community Unit School District 100
- Williamsfield Community Unit School District 210

Secondary school districts include:

- Limestone Community High School District 310

Elementary school districts include:

- Bartonville School District 66
- Hollis Consolidated School District 328
- Limestone Walters Community Consolidated School District 316
- Monroe School District 70
- Norwood Elementary School District 63
- Oak Grove School District 68
- Pleasant Hill School District 69
- Pleasant Valley School District 62

== See also ==
- National Register of Historic Places listings in Peoria County, Illinois
