= Rome, Illinois =

Rome is a census-designated place (CDP) in Chillicothe Township, Peoria County, Illinois, United States. As of the 2020 census, Rome had a population of 1,604. Rome is part of the Peoria, Illinois Metropolitan Statistical Area.

== Geography ==
Rome is located at 40°52′37″N 89°30′42″W.

According to the United States Census Bureau, the CDP has a total area of 1.9 square miles (4.9 km^{2}), all land.

== Demographics ==
Historical population
Census	Pop.	Note	%±
2000	1,776		—
2010	1,738		−2.1%
2020	1,604		−7.7%
U.S. Decennial Census

=== Racial and ethnic composition ===
Rome CDP, Illinois – Racial and ethnic composition Note: the US Census treats Hispanic/Latino as an ethnic category. This table excludes Latinos from the racial categories and assigns them to a separate category. Hispanics/Latinos may be of any race.
Race / Ethnicity (NH = Non-Hispanic)	Pop 2000	Pop 2010	Pop 2020	% 2000	% 2010	% 2020
White alone (NH)	1,729	1,676	1,476	97.35%	96.43%	92.02%
Black or African American alone (NH)	5	6	7	0.28%	0.35%	0.44%
Native American or Alaska Native alone (NH)	0	3	1	0.00%	0.17%	0.06%
Asian alone (NH)	6	5	4	0.34%	0.29%	0.25%
Native Hawaiian or Pacific Islander alone (NH)	2	0	0	0.11%	0.00%	0.00%
Other race alone (NH)	1	1	6	0.06%	0.06%	0.37%
Mixed race or Multiracial (NH)	11	19	67	0.62%	1.09%	4.18%
Hispanic or Latino (any race)	22	28	43	1.24%	1.61%	2.68%
Total	1,776	1,738	1,604	100.00%	100.00%	100.00%

=== 2020 census ===
As of the 2020 census, Rome had a population of 1,604. The median age was 43.6 years. 22.3% of residents were under the age of 18 and 21.1% were 65 years of age or older. For every 100 females, there were 103.3 males, and for every 100 females age 18 and over, there were 101.8 males age 18 and over.

87.2% of residents lived in urban areas, while 12.8% lived in rural areas.

There were 670 households, of which 28.7% had children under the age of 18 living in them. Of all households, 50.6% were married-couple households, 17.0% were households with a male householder and no spouse or partner present, and 21.6% were households with a female householder and no spouse or partner present. About 25.2% of all households were made up of individuals, and 12.7% had someone living alone who was 65 years of age or older.

There were 724 housing units, of which 7.5% were vacant. The homeowner vacancy rate was 1.9% and the rental vacancy rate was 3.6%.

=== 2000 census ===
At the 2000 census, there were 1,776 people, 704 households and 508 families residing in the CDP. The population density was 932.5 inhabitants per square mile (360.0/km^{2}). There were 746 housing units at an average density of 391.7 per square mile (151.2/km^{2}). The racial makeup was 98.20% White, 0.28% African American, 0.34% Asian, 0.11% Pacific Islander, 0.34% from other races, and 0.73% from two or more races. Hispanic or Latino of any race were 1.24% of the population.

There were 704 households, of which 29.8% had children under the age of 18 living with them, 60.5% were married couples living together, 8.8% had a female householder with no husband present, and 27.7% were non-families. 23.0% of all households were made up of individuals, and 7.2% had someone living alone who was 65 years of age or older. The average household size was 2.51 and the average family size was 2.95.

23.6% of the population were under the age of 18, 7.4% from 18 to 24, 29.7% from 25 to 44, 26.7% from 45 to 64, and 12.6% who were 65 years of age or older. The median age was 40 years. For every 100 females, there were 105.3 males. For every 100 females age 18 and over, there were 104.7 males.

The median household income was $40,962 and the median family income was $46,250. Males had a median income of $35,036 and females $25,486. The per capita income was $18,345. About 3.7% of families and 4.4% of the population were below the poverty line, including 2.5% of those under age 18 and 10.7% of those age 65 or over.

== Education ==
The school district is Illinois Valley Central Unit School District 321.
