= Kickapoo Township, Peoria County, Illinois =

Kickapoo Township
- Township
- Location in Peoria County

- Peoria County's location in Illinois
- Country: United States
- State: Illinois
- County: Peoria
- Established: November 6, 1849

Area
  - Total: 32.08 sq mi (83.1 km^{2})
  - Land: 32.01 sq mi (82.9 km^{2})
  - Water: 0.07 sq mi (0.18 km^{2}) 0.22%

Population (2010)
  - Estimate (2016): 7,120
  - Density: 223.6/sq mi (86.3/km^{2})
- Time zone: UTC-6 (CST)
  - Summer (DST): UTC-5 (CDT)
- FIPS code: 17-143-39818

Kickapoo Township is located in Peoria County, Illinois. As of the 2010 census, its population was 7,158 and it contained 3,005 housing units. Kickapoo Township changed its name from Orange Township on an unknown date, but the best guess is 1850.

== Geography ==
According to the 2010 census, the township has a total area of 32.08 square miles (83.1 km^{2}), of which 32.01 square miles (82.9 km^{2}) (or 99.78%) is land and 0.07 square miles (0.18 km^{2}) (or 0.22%) is water.

=== Cities ===
- Peoria (part)

=== Other Communities ===
- Kickapoo at 40.789884°N 89.751198°W

== Demographics ==
Historical population
Census	Pop.	Note	%±
2010	7,158		—
2016 (est.)	7,120		−0.5%
U.S. Decennial Census
