= Brimfield Township, Peoria County, Illinois =

Coordinates: 40°50′48″N 89°55′23″W

Brimfield Township
- Township
- Location in Peoria County

- Peoria County's location in Illinois
- Country: United States
- State: Illinois
- County: Peoria
- Established: November 6, 1849

Area
  - Total: 36.49 sq mi (94.5 km^{2})
  - Land: 36.49 sq mi (94.5 km^{2})
  - Water: 0 sq mi (0 km^{2}) 0%

Population (2010)
  - Estimate (2016): 1,209
  - Density: 33.8/sq mi (13.1/km^{2})
- Time zone: UTC-6 (CST)
  - Summer (DST): UTC-5 (CDT)
- FIPS code: 17-143-08316

Brimfield Township is located in Peoria County, Illinois, United States. As of the 2010 census, its population was 1,235 and it contained 503 housing units. The village of Brimfield is located in Brimfield Township.

== Geography ==
According to the 2010 census, the township has a total area of 36.49 square miles (94.5 km^{2}), all land.

== Demographics ==
Historical population
| Census | Pop. | Note | %± |
|---|---|---|---|
| 2016 (est.) | 1,209 |
U.S. Decennial Census
