= Sand Prairie Township, Tazewell County, Illinois =

Coordinates: 40°26′04″N 89°39′27″W

Sand Prairie Township
- Township
- Location in Tazewell County
- Country: United States
- State: Illinois
- County: Tazewell
- Established: November 6, 1849

Area
  - Total: 35.46 sq mi (91.8 km^{2})
  - Land: 35.46 sq mi (91.8 km^{2})
  - Water: 0 sq mi (0 km^{2}) 0%

Population (2010)
  - Estimate (2016): 1,400
  - Density: 40.6/sq mi (15.7/km^{2})
- Time zone: UTC-6 (CST)
  - Summer (DST): UTC-5 (CDT)
- FIPS code: 17-179-67483

Sand Prairie Township is located in Tazewell County, Illinois. As of the 2010 census, its population was 1,441 and it contained 582 housing units. Sand Prairie Township changed its name from Jefferson Township May 20, 1850.

== Geography ==
According to the 2010 census, the township has a total area of 35.46 square miles (91.8 km^{2}), all land.

== Demographics ==
Historical population
| Census | Pop. | Note | %± |
|---|---|---|---|
| 2016 (est.) | 1,400 |
U.S. Decennial Census
