= West Peoria, Illinois =

West Peoria
- City
- Location of West Peoria in Peoria County, Illinois.
- Coordinates: 40°41′46″N 89°37′52″W
- Country: United States
- State: Illinois
- County: Peoria
- Township: Limestone
- Incorporated: 1993

Government
  - Mayor: James R. Dillon

Area
  - Total: 2.10 sq mi (5.45 km^{2})
  - Land: 2.10 sq mi (5.45 km^{2})
  - Water: 0 sq mi (0.00 km^{2})
- Elevation: 591 ft (180 m)

Population (2020)
  - Total: 4,263
  - Estimate (2024): 4,204
  - Density: 2,024.5/sq mi (781.65/km^{2})
- Time zone: UTC-6 (CST)
  - Summer (DST): UTC-5 (CDT)
- ZIP code: 61604
- Area code: 309
- FIPS code: 17-80736
- GNIS feature ID: 2397272
- Website: www.cityofwestpeoria.org

West Peoria is a city in Peoria County, Illinois, United States. As of the 2020 census, West Peoria had a population of 4,263. West Peoria is a suburb of Peoria and is part of the Peoria, Illinois Metropolitan Statistical Area.

== Geography ==
According to the 2010 census, West Peoria has a total area of 1.27 square miles (3.29 km^{2}), all land.

West Peoria is home to many geographical landmarks such as Rocky Glen, which is a series of abandoned mines.

== Demographics ==
Historical population
Census	Pop.	Note	%±
2000	4,762		—
2010	4,458		−6.4%
2020	4,263		−4.4%
U.S. Decennial Census

=== Racial and ethnic composition ===
West Peoria city, Illinois – Racial and ethnic composition Note: the US Census treats Hispanic/Latino as an ethnic category. This table excludes Latinos from the racial categories and assigns them to a separate category. Hispanics/Latinos may be of any race.
Race / Ethnicity (NH = Non-Hispanic)	Pop 2000	Pop 2010	Pop 2020	% 2000	% 2010	% 2020
White alone (NH)	4,159	3,491	2,968	87.34%	78.31%	69.62%
Black or African American alone (NH)	405	634	823	8.50%	14.22%	19.31%
Native American or Alaska Native alone (NH)	8	23	9	0.17%	0.52%	0.21%
Asian alone (NH)	41	48	37	0.86%	1.08%	0.87%
Native Hawaiian or Pacific Islander alone (NH)	0	0	0	0.00%	0.00%	0.00%
Other race alone (NH)	9	10	17	0.19%	0.22%	0.40%
Mixed race or Multiracial (NH)	74	120	250	1.55%	2.69%	5.86%
Hispanic or Latino (any race)	66	132	159	1.39%	2.96%	3.73%
Total	4,762	4,458	4,263	100.00%	100.00%	100.00%

=== 2020 census ===
As of the 2020 census, West Peoria had a population of 4,263. The median age was 40.7 years. 19.7% of residents were under the age of 18 and 20.2% were 65 years of age or older. For every 100 females, there were 92.9 males, and for every 100 females age 18 and over, there were 89.0 males age 18 and over.

100.0% of residents lived in urban areas, while 0.0% lived in rural areas.

There were 1,887 households, of which 23.8% had children under the age of 18 living in them. Of all households, 33.6% were married-couple households, 23.2% were households with a male householder and no spouse or partner present, and 34.4% were households with a female householder and no spouse or partner present. About 38.0% of all households were made up of individuals, and 14.6% had someone living alone who was 65 years of age or older.

There were 2,116 housing units, of which 10.8% were vacant. The homeowner vacancy rate was 3.7%, and the rental vacancy rate was 11.5%.

=== 2000 census ===
As of the census of 2000, there were 4,762 people, 1,984 households, and 1,222 families residing in the city. The population density was 3,703.7 inhabitants per square mile (1,430.0/km^{2}). There were 2,128 housing units at an average density of 1,655.1 per square mile (639.0/km^{2}). The racial makeup of the city was 88.09% White, 8.53% African American, 0.19% Native American, 0.86% Asian, 0.73% from other races, and 1.60% from two or more races. Hispanic or Latino of any race were 1.39% of the population.

There were 1,984 households, out of which 25.7% had children under the age of 18 living with them, 47.8% were married couples living together, 10.5% had a female householder with no husband present, and 38.4% were non-families. 32.1% of all households were made up of individuals, and 12.9% had someone living alone who was 65 years of age or older. The average household size was 2.29 and the average family size was 2.89.

In the city, the population was spread out, with 21.9% under the age of 18, 7.8% from 18 to 24, 27.8% from 25 to 44, 22.7% from 45 to 64, and 19.8% who were 65 years of age or older. The median age was 40 years. For every 100 females, there were 86.3 males. For every 100 females age 18 and over, there were 82.5 males.

The median income for a household in the city was $41,148, and the median income for a family was $51,420. Males had a median income of $36,130 versus $28,519 for females. The per capita income for the city was $22,247. About 5.0% of families and 8.1% of the population were below the poverty line, including 13.2% of those under age 18 and 6.6% of those age 65 or over.

== Transportation ==
CityLink provides bus service on Routes 5 and 11 connecting West Peoria to downtown Peoria, Northwoods Mall and other destinations.

== Education ==
It is partly in Peoria School District 150, and partly in Pleasant Valley School District 62 and Limestone Community High School District 310.
