= Malone Township, Tazewell County, Illinois =

Coordinates: 40°21′35″N 89°39′19″W

Malone Township
- Township
- Location in Tazewell County
- Country: United States
- State: Illinois
- County: Tazewell
- Established: November 1854

Area
  - Total: 29.68 sq mi (76.9 km^{2})
  - Land: 29.68 sq mi (76.9 km^{2})
  - Water: 0 sq mi (0 km^{2}) 0%

Population (2010)
  - Estimate (2016): 214
  - Density: 7.4/sq mi (2.9/km^{2})
- Time zone: UTC-6 (CST)
  - Summer (DST): UTC-5 (CDT)
- FIPS code: 17-179-46266

Malone Township is located in Tazewell County, Illinois. As of the 2010 census, its population was 220 and it contained 95 housing units. Malone Township formed from Delavan Township in November, 1854.

== Geography ==
According to the 2010 census, the township has a total area of 29.68 square miles (76.9 km^{2}), all land.

== Demographics ==
Historical population
Census	Pop.	Note	%±
2016 (est.)	214
U.S. Decennial Census

The median age in Malone is 40. 53.5% of residents are male, and 46.5% of residents are female. 100% of residents are white. The median income per capita is $77,782. 58% of residents are married. 100% of residents have a high school education or higher, and 45.6% of residents have a bachelor's degree or higher.
