= Jubilee Township, Peoria County, Illinois =

Coordinates: 40°50′31″N 89°48′35″W

Jubilee Township
- Township
- Location in Peoria County

- Peoria County's location in Illinois
- Country: United States
- State: Illinois
- County: Peoria
- Established: November 6, 1849

Area
  - Total: 36.26 sq mi (93.9 km^{2})
  - Land: 36.25 sq mi (93.9 km^{2})
  - Water: 0.01 sq mi (0.026 km^{2}) 0.03%

Population (2010)
  - Estimate (2016): 1,695
  - Density: 46.8/sq mi (18.1/km^{2})
- Time zone: UTC-6 (CST)
  - Summer (DST): UTC-5 (CDT)
- FIPS code: 17-143-38765

Jubilee Township is located in Peoria County, Illinois. As of the 2010 census, its population was 1,695 and it contained 601 housing units.

== Geography ==
According to the 2010 census, the township has a total area of 36.26 square miles (93.9 km^{2}), of which 36.25 square miles (93.9 km^{2}) (or 99.97%) is land and 0.01 square miles (0.026 km^{2}) (or 0.03%) is water.

== Demographics ==
Historical population
Census	Pop.	Note	%±
2016 (est.)	1,695
U.S. Decennial Census
