= Elmwood Township, Peoria County, Illinois =

Coordinates: 40°46′16″N 89°56′44″W

Elmwood Township
- Township
- Location in Peoria County

- Peoria County's location in Illinois
- Country: United States
- State: Illinois
- County: Peoria
- Established: November 6, 1849

Area
  - Total: 36.55 sq mi (94.7 km^{2})
  - Land: 36.1 sq mi (93 km^{2})
  - Water: 0.45 sq mi (1.2 km^{2}) 1.23%

Population (2010)
  - Estimate (2016): 2,570
  - Density: 72/sq mi (28/km^{2})
- Time zone: UTC-6 (CST)
  - Summer (DST): UTC-5 (CDT)
- FIPS code: 17-143-23711
- Website: elmwoodtownshp.com

Elmwood Township is located in Peoria County, Illinois, United States. As of the 2010 census, its population was 2,598 and it contained 1,094 housing units.

== Geography ==
According to the 2010 census, the township has a total area of 36.55 square miles (94.7 km^{2}), of which 36.1 square miles (93 km^{2}) (or 98.77%) is land and 0.45 square miles (1.2 km^{2}) (or 1.23%) is water.

== Demographics ==
Historical population
Census	Pop.	Note	%±
2016 (est.)	2,570
U.S. Decennial Census
