= Rosefield Township, Peoria County, Illinois =

Coordinates: 40°44′58″N 89°49′04″W

Rosefield Township
- Township
- Location in Peoria County

- Peoria County's location in Illinois
- Country: United States
- State: Illinois
- County: Peoria
- Established: November 6, 1849

Area
  - Total: 36.53 sq mi (94.6 km^{2})
  - Land: 36.38 sq mi (94.2 km^{2})
  - Water: 0.15 sq mi (0.39 km^{2}) 0.41%

Population (2010)
  - Estimate (2016): 1,210
  - Density: 33.5/sq mi (12.9/km^{2})
- Time zone: UTC-6 (CST)
  - Summer (DST): UTC-5 (CDT)
- FIPS code: 17-143-65715

Rosefield Township is located in Peoria County, Illinois. At the 2010 census, its population was 1,217 and it contained 489 housing units.

== Geography ==
According to the 2010 census, the township has a total area of 36.53 square miles (94.6 km^{2}), of which 36.38 square miles (94.2 km^{2}) (or 99.59%) is land and 0.15 square miles (0.39 km^{2}) (or 0.41%) is water.

== Demographics ==
Historical population
Census	Pop.	Note	%±
2016 (est.)	1,210
U.S. Decennial Census
