= Chillicothe Township, Peoria County, Illinois =

Coordinates: 40°54′52″N 89°29′41″W

Chillicothe Township
- Township
- Location in Peoria County

- Peoria County's location in Illinois
- Country: United States
- State: Illinois
- County: Peoria
- Established: November 6, 1849

Area
  - Total: 20.44 sq mi (52.9 km^{2})
  - Land: 17.92 sq mi (46.4 km^{2})
  - Water: 2.52 sq mi (6.5 km^{2}) 12.33%

Population (2010)
  - Estimate (2016): 8,461
  - Density: 466.9/sq mi (180.3/km^{2})
- Time zone: UTC-6 (CST)
  - Summer (DST): UTC-5 (CDT)
- FIPS code: 17-143-14130

Chillicothe Township is located in Peoria County, Illinois, United States. As of the 2010 census, its population was 8,364 and it contained 3,694 housing units.

== Geography ==
According to the 2010 census, the township has a total area of 20.44 square miles (52.9 km^{2}), of which 17.92 square miles (46.4 km^{2}) (or 87.67%) is land and 2.52 square miles (6.5 km^{2}) (or 12.33%) is water.

== Demographics ==
Historical population
Census	Pop.	Note	%±
2016 (est.)	8,461
U.S. Decennial Census
