= Greater Peoria Mass Transit District =

CityLink

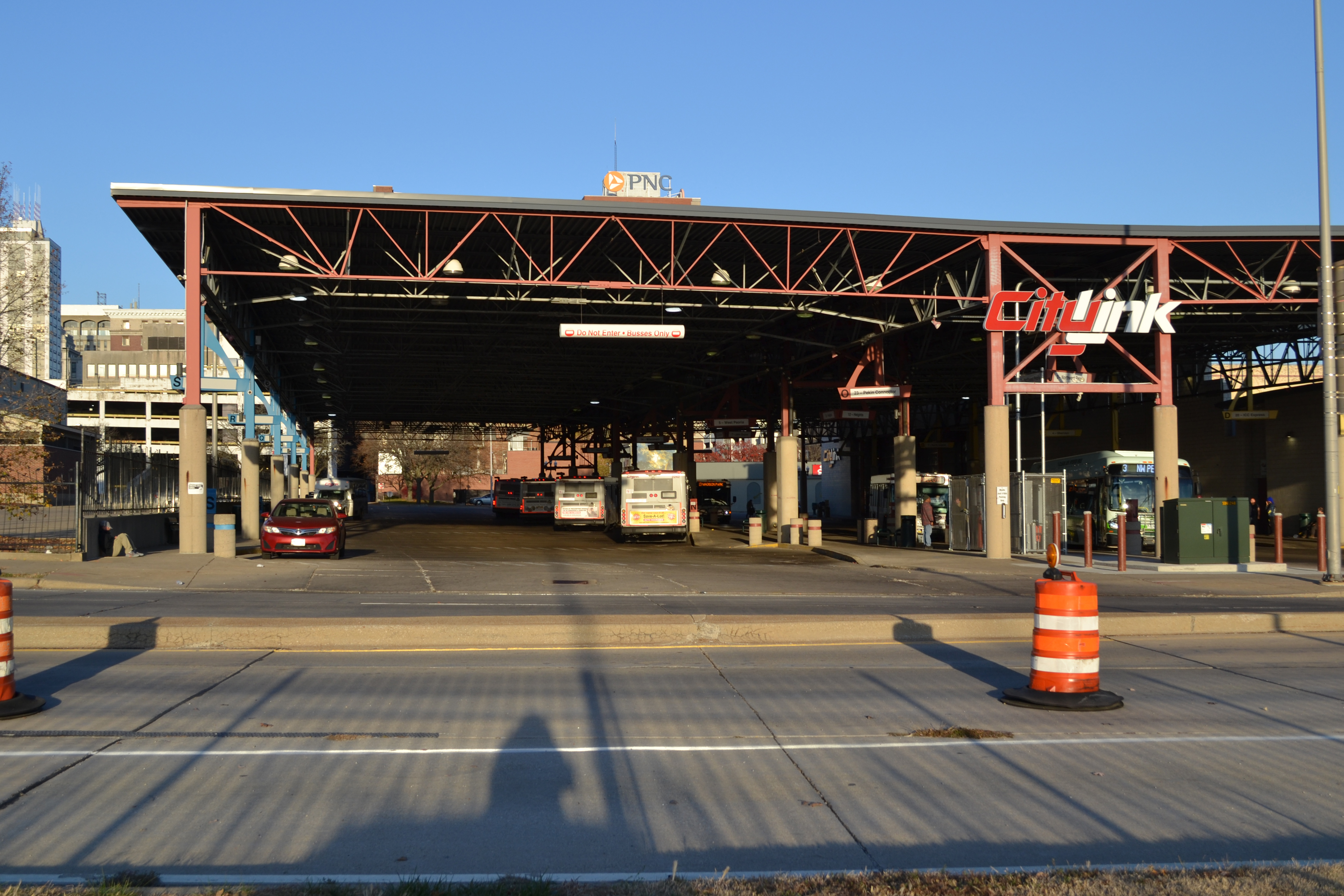
- CityLink station in downtown Peoria
- Parent: Greater Peoria Mass Transit District
- Founded: May 4, 1970
- Headquarters: 2105 NE Jefferson St.
- Locale: Peoria, Illinois
- Service area: Peoria County, Illinois; Tazewell County, Illinois
- Service type: bus service; paratransit; rural transportation
- Routes: 18
- Daily ridership: 6,300 (weekdays, Q2 2026)
- Annual ridership: 2,066,000 (2025)
- Fuel type: Diesel, hybrid, electric
- Operator: First Transit (CityLink); Transdev (CityLift, CountyLink)
- Chief executive: Doug Roelfs
- Website: ridecitylink.org

The Greater Peoria Mass Transit District is a mass transit district based in Peoria, Illinois, United States; the district itself also includes Peoria Heights and West Peoria. It was established in 1970 and, prior to adopting the name CityLink, it was known as GPTransit. Regularly scheduled fixed route bus service is operated under the name CityLink, with the paratransit service being CityLift, and rural transportation service being CountyLink. In 2025, the system had a ridership of 2,066,000, or about 6,300 per weekday as of the second quarter of 2026.

== History ==
Public Transit in Peoria began in 1870 with horse-drawn streetcars. Between 1889 and 1892, these were replaced by electric streetcars. The first buses were introduced in 1923 and from 1931 on trolleybuses were operated as well. The last streetcars and trolleybuses ran in 1946, being replaced by diesel buses. Greater Peoria Mass Transit District was formed in 1970 to take over operations of the struggling privately run bus service.

In 1991, GP Transit became the first transit system in the country to test an ethanol powered bus. GP Transit was rebranded as CityLink in 2000, and soon after, in 2003, a new transit center was opened in downtown Peoria. On June 8, 2014, CityLink began offering Sunday service for the first time, which helped lead to fiscal year 2015 having the highest ever ridership for the system, at 3,420,705 riders.

CityLink unveiled its first three electric buses in September 2021.The buses were manufactured by Proterra, Inc. and funded by a federal grant and lawsuit settlement.

== Routes ==
CityLink operates 18 fixed routes in Peoria County and Tazewell County, Illinois, including one "intercity" route between the main network and the Pekin, Illinois network.

- 1 University
- 2 North Adams
- 3 Northwest Peoria
- 4 Sheridan
- 5 West Peoria
- 7 John Gwynn
- 8 East Peoria / Sunnyland
- 10 Forrest Hill
- 11 Western
- 12 Heights
- 13 South Adams
- 14 Wisconsin
- 15 Lincoln
- 17 Pekin North
- 18 Pekin South
- 20 ICC Express
- 23 Pekin Connector

== Peoria Transit Center ==
The Peoria Transit Center serves as the primary hub for CityLink, located at 407 SW Adams Street in downtown Peoria. It was completed in 2003 and remodeled in 2019–2020. The center has an indoor waiting area, covered transfer area and ticket sales. In addition to CityLink, Burlington Trailways intercity buses also serve the facility.

== Fixed route ridership ==
The ridership statistics shown here are of fixed route services only and do not include demand response.

== See also ==
- List of bus transit systems in the United States
