= Lake Camelot, Illinois =

- Census-designated place
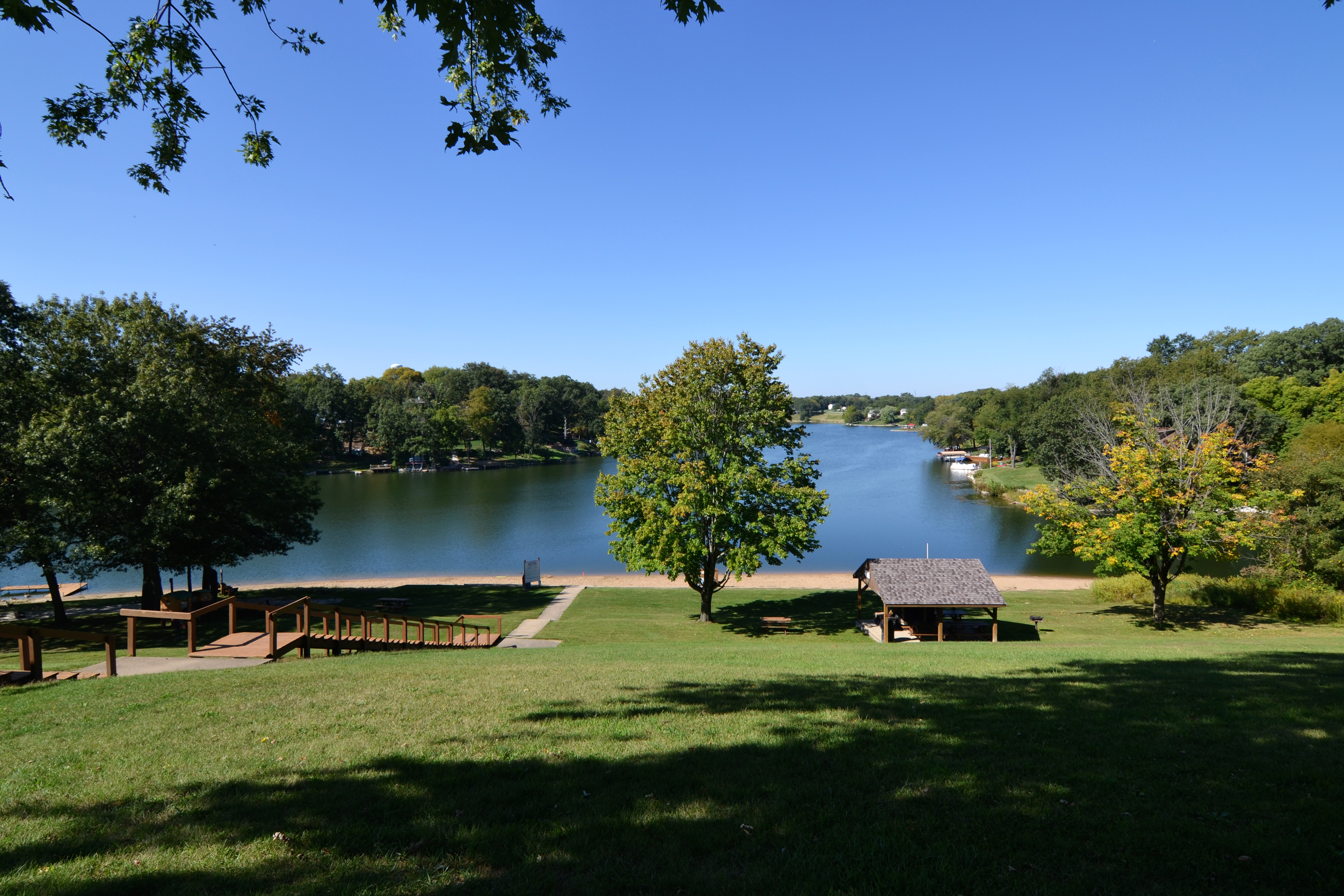
- View from Lake Camelot Clubhouse

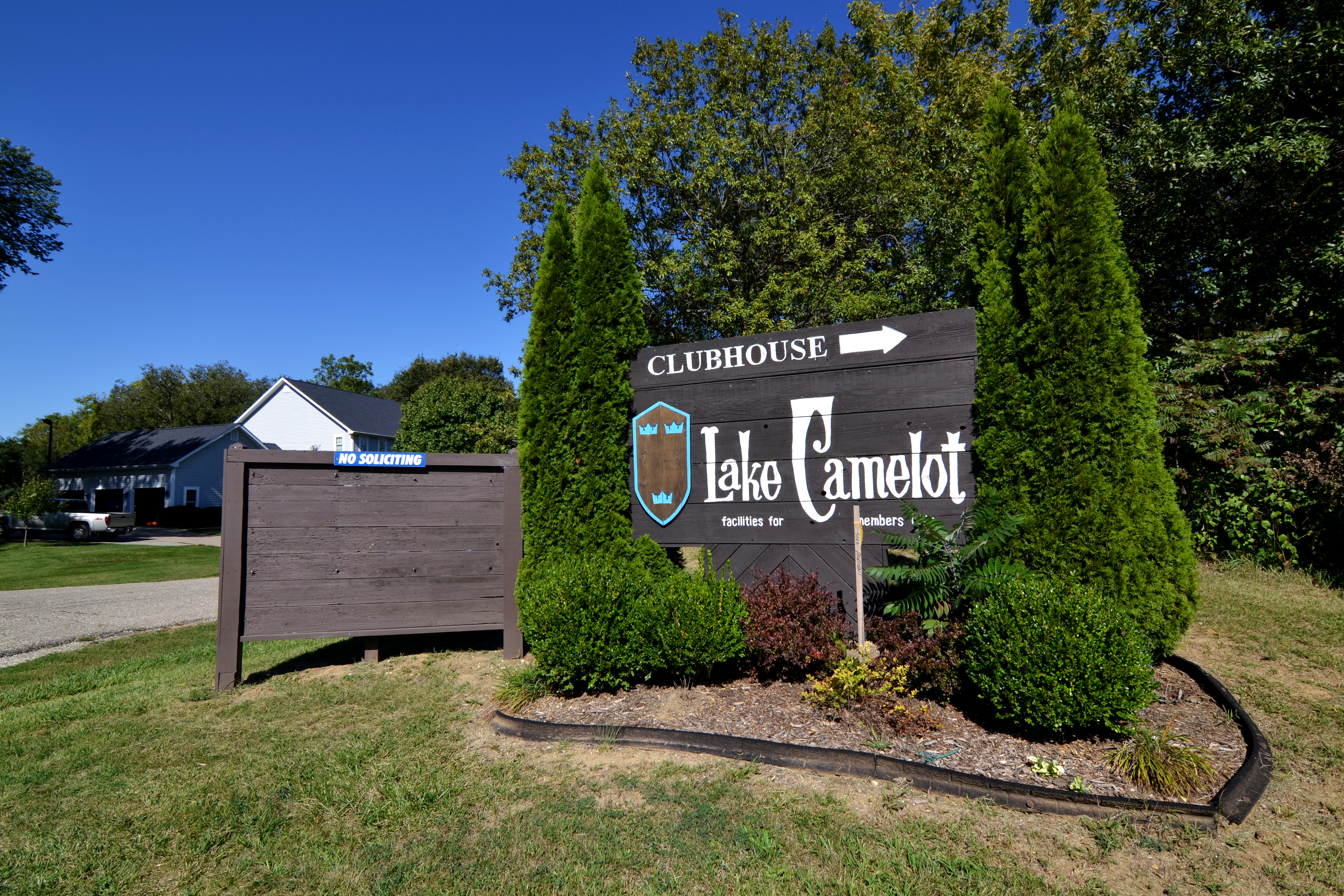
- Seal

- Location within Illinois
- Coordinates: 40°37′50″N 89°44′46″W
- Country: United States
- State: Illinois
- County: Peoria
- Established: 1969

Area
  - Total: 1.87 sq mi (4.85 km^{2})
  - Land: 1.74 sq mi (4.51 km^{2})
  - Water: 0.13 sq mi (0.34 km^{2})
- Elevation: 623 ft (190 m)

Population (2020)
  - Total: 1,798
  - Density: 1,032.5/sq mi (398.65/km^{2})
- Time zone: UTC-6 (Central (CST))
  - Summer (DST): UTC-5 (CDT)
- Zip code: 61547
- Area code: 309
- GNIS feature ID: 2629893

Lake Camelot is a census-designated place (CDP) in Peoria County, Illinois, United States. Its population was 1,798 as of the 2020 census.

Lake Camelot was developed in 1969 and consists of 640 acres. As of 2023, there are approximately 620 homes.

There are two lakes, Lake Camelot (45 acres (18 ha)) and Lake Lancelot (42 acres (17 ha)) which are stocked with a variety of fish and have boat ramps and docks available. The clubhouse complex comprises three pools and a beach that are open from Memorial Day to Labor Day each year to members and their guests.

It is named after Camelot, the castle and court from Arthurian legends.

== Demographics ==
Historical population
Census	Pop.	Note	%±
2010	1,686		—
2020	1,798		6.6%
U.S. Decennial Census

Lake Camelot first appeared as a census designated place in the 2010 U.S. census.

=== Racial and ethnic composition ===
Lake Camelot CDP, Illinois – Racial and ethnic composition Note: the US Census treats Hispanic/Latino as an ethnic category. This table excludes Latinos from the racial categories and assigns them to a separate category. Hispanics/Latinos may be of any race.
Race / Ethnicity (NH = Non-Hispanic)	Pop 2010	Pop 2020	% 2010	% 2020
White alone (NH)	1,609	1,683	95.43%	93.60%
Black or African American alone (NH)	21	9	1.25%	0.50%
Native American or Alaska Native alone (NH)	1	3	0.06%	0.17%
Asian alone (NH)	9	7	0.53%	0.39%
Native Hawaiian or Pacific Islander alone (NH)	2	0	0.12%	0.00%
Other race alone (NH)	0	3	0.00%	0.17%
Mixed race or Multiracial (NH)	9	61	0.53%	3.39%
Hispanic or Latino (any race)	35	32	2.08%	1.78%
Total	1,686	1,798	100.00%	100.00%

=== 2020 census ===
As of the 2020 census, Lake Camelot had a population of 1,798. The median age was 40.7 years. 26.1% of residents were under the age of 18 and 17.0% of residents were 65 years of age or older. For every 100 females there were 96.9 males, and for every 100 females age 18 and over there were 100.0 males age 18 and over.

0.0% of residents lived in urban areas, while 100.0% lived in rural areas.

There were 633 households in Lake Camelot, of which 38.7% had children under the age of 18 living in them. Of all households, 72.8% were married-couple households, 11.1% were households with a male householder and no spouse or partner present, and 11.2% were households with a female householder and no spouse or partner present. About 12.5% of all households were made up of individuals and 7.2% had someone living alone who was 65 years of age or older.

There were 656 housing units, of which 3.5% were vacant. The homeowner vacancy rate was 2.2% and the rental vacancy rate was 10.0%.

== Education ==
The school district is Illini Bluffs Community Unit School District 327.
