= Illinois Route 40 =

State highway in central Illinois, US

Illinois Route 40
- IL 40 highlighted in red

Route information
- Maintained by IDOT
- Length: 112.05 mi (180.33 km)
- Existed: November 5, 1918–present

Major junctions
- South end: I-74 / IL 29 in East Peoria
- I-74 in Peoria; US 150 in Peoria; US 6 / US 34 in Sheffield; I-80 in Sheffield I-88 / IL 110 (CKC) in Rock Falls; US 30 in Rock Falls
- North end: IL 78 in Mount Carroll

Location
- Country: United States
- State: Illinois
- Counties: Tazewell, Peoria, Marshall, Stark, Bureau, Whiteside, Carroll

Highway system
- Illinois State Highway System; Interstate; US; State; Tollways; Scenic
← US 40	→ I-41
← I-88	→ IL 89

Illinois Route 40 (IL 40) is a 112.05-mile-long (180.33 km) north–south route in central portion of the U.S. state of Illinois. It runs from Interstate 74 (I-74) in East Peoria north to IL 78 at Mt. Carroll, just south of U.S. Route 52 (US 52) and IL 64.

== Route description ==
Illinois 40 is known as Knoxville Avenue in the Peoria area, generally south of Illinois Route 6. Route 40 crosses over Interstate 74 north of downtown, and then grows complex in the downtown area, as there are three turns in a one-block length. Illinois 40 then emerges onto William Kumpf Boulevard and crosses over the Illinois River using the Bob Michel Bridge. On the other side of the river, Illinois 40 is briefly called Washington Street. It then is routed onto an onramp to Interstate 74, where there is an exit to Camp Street before terminating at I-74.

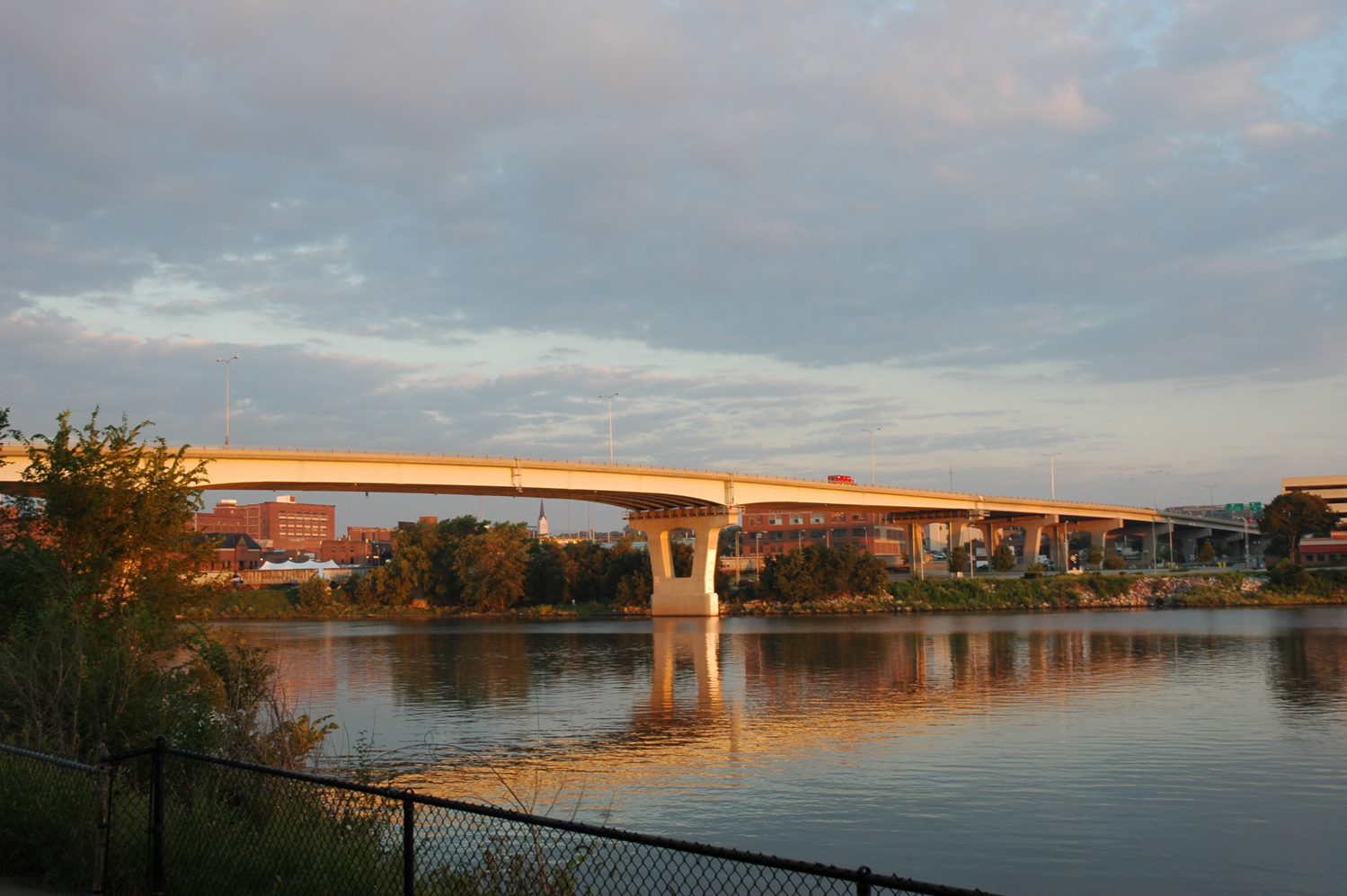
Bob Michel Bridge carrying IL 40 over the Illinois River

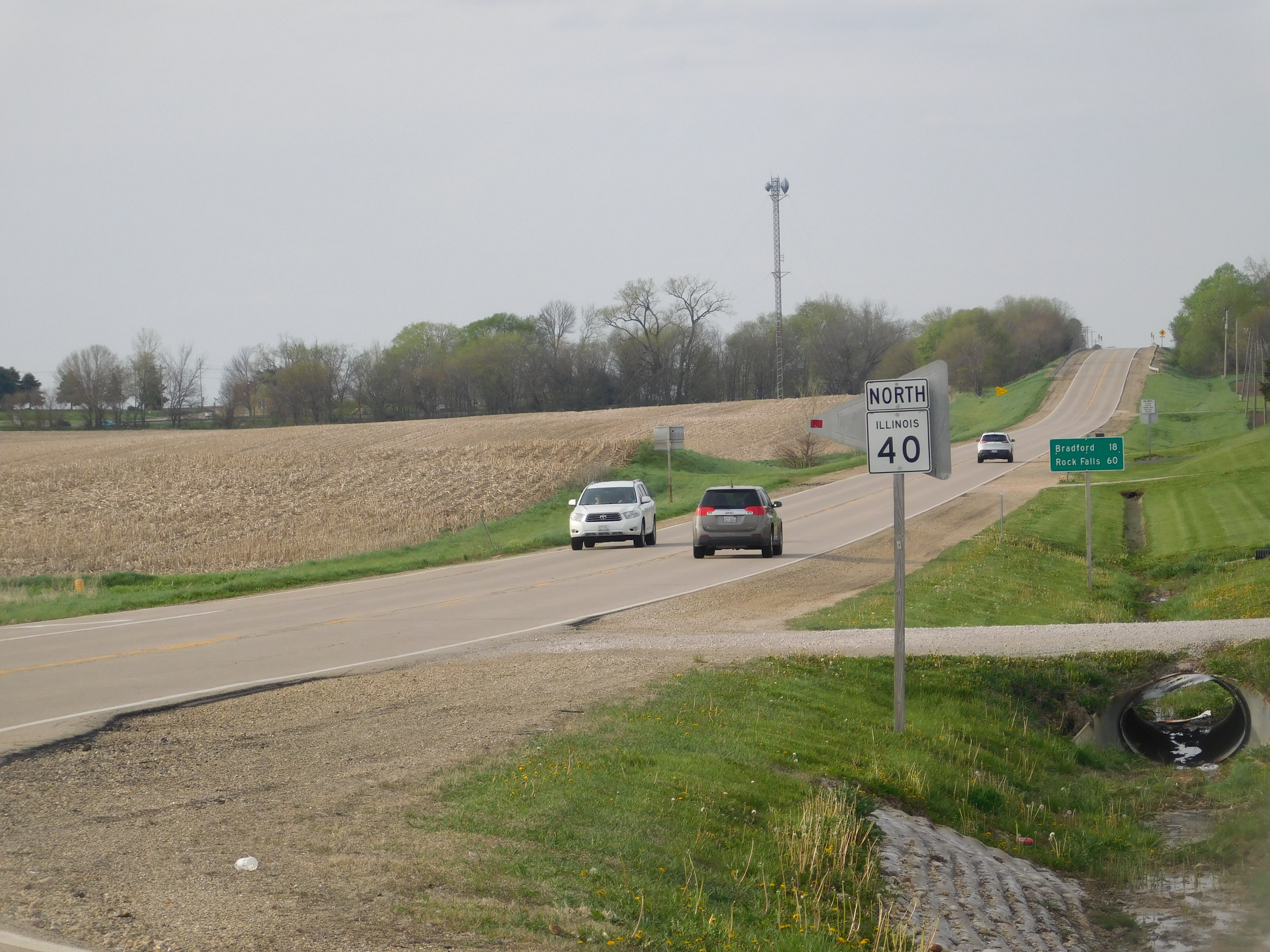
IL 40 in Peoria County, north of IL 90

== History ==
Originally, SBI Route 40 ran from Sterling to Stockton. In 1935, IL 40 got cut back to Mount Carroll in favor of IL 78. By 1938, Illinois Route 88 entirely acquired IL 40 north of Sterling. In 1987, Illinois Route 5, a four-lane freeway, was designated Interstate 88 east of I-80, leading to two identically-numbered routes intersecting each other at an interchange. By 1995, IDOT redesignated IL 88 as IL 40 to prevent confusion. Although the new number is also the number of a Federal Highway that passes through Illinois (U.S. Route 40), a great enough distance exists between them that the possibility of confusing one for the other is negligible.

Prior to 2003, the Illinois 40 exit on I-74 southeast of Peoria was called "Industrial Spur". As part of the Upgrade 74 Project, the exit was renamed by the Illinois Department of Transportation to Riverfront Drive.

== Major intersections ==
County	Location	mi	km	Destinations	Notes
Tazewell	East Peoria	0.0	0.0	I-74 / IL 29 – Peoria, Bloomington	Southern terminus; I-74 exit 94
Tazewell	East Peoria	0.3	0.48	Camp Street	Interchange; southbound exit and entrance
Tazewell	East Peoria	0.4	0.64	W. Washington Street east – East Peoria	Interchange; left entrance northbound, left exits
Illinois River		0.8	1.3	Bob Michel Bridge	
Peoria	Peoria	2.5	4.0	I-74 – Galesburg, Bloomington	I-74 exits 92A–B
Peoria	Peoria	4.4	7.1	US 150 (War Memorial Drive)	
Peoria	Peoria	9.7	15.6	IL 6 to I-74 / I-474 – Chillicothe	IL 6 exit 6
Peoria		18.6	29.9	IL 90 west (Truitt Road)	
Marshall		25.6	41.2	IL 17 east	South end of IL 17 concurrency
Stark		30.1	48.4	IL 17 west	North end of IL 17 concurrency
Stark		38.1	61.3	IL 93 west	
Bureau		51.2	82.4	US 6 (Grand Army of the Republic Highway) / US 34 (Walter Payton Memorial Highway)	
Bureau		52.8	85.0	I-80 – Moline, Rock Island, Joliet	I-80 exit 45
Bureau		64.9	104.4	IL 92	
Whiteside		73.4	118.1	IL 172 south (Star Road)	
Whiteside		78.0	125.5	I-88 / IL 110 (CKC) (Ronald Reagan Memorial Highway) – Moline, Rock Island, Dixon	I-88 exit 41
Whiteside	Rock Falls	78.9	127.0	US 30 (Rock Falls Road)	
Whiteside	Sterling	80.6	129.7	IL 2 north / Lincoln Highway east (3rd Street, 4th Street)	
Whiteside	Sterling	80.8	130.0	Lincoln Highway west (5th Street)	
Carroll	Mount Carroll	112.05	180.33	IL 78 (Clay Street)	
1.000 mi = 1.609 km; 1.000 km = 0.621 mi: Concurrency terminus; Incomplete access
