= Millbrook Township, Peoria County, Illinois =

Coordinates: 40°55′58″N 89°55′46″W

Millbrook Township
- Township
- Location in Peoria County

- Peoria County's location in Illinois
- Country: United States
- State: Illinois
- County: Peoria
- Established: November 6, 1849

Area
  - Total: 36.67 sq mi (95.0 km^{2})
  - Land: 36.57 sq mi (94.7 km^{2})
  - Water: 0.11 sq mi (0.28 km^{2}) 0.30%

Population (2010)
  - Estimate (2016): 481
  - Density: 13.3/sq mi (5.1/km^{2})
- Time zone: UTC-6 (CST)
  - Summer (DST): UTC-5 (CDT)
- FIPS code: 17-143-49113

Millbrook Township is located in Peoria County, Illinois. As of the 2020 census, its population was 419 and it contained 192 housing units.

As of the 2010 census, its population was 488 and it contained 197 housing units.

== Geography ==
According to the 2010 census, the township has a total area of 36.67 square miles (95.0 km^{2}), of which 36.57 square miles (94.7 km^{2}) (or 99.73%) is land and 0.11 square miles (0.28 km^{2}) (or 0.30%) is water.

== Demographics ==
Historical population
Census	Pop.	Note	%±
2016 (est.)	481
U.S. Decennial Census
