= Mapleton, Illinois =

Mapleton
- Village
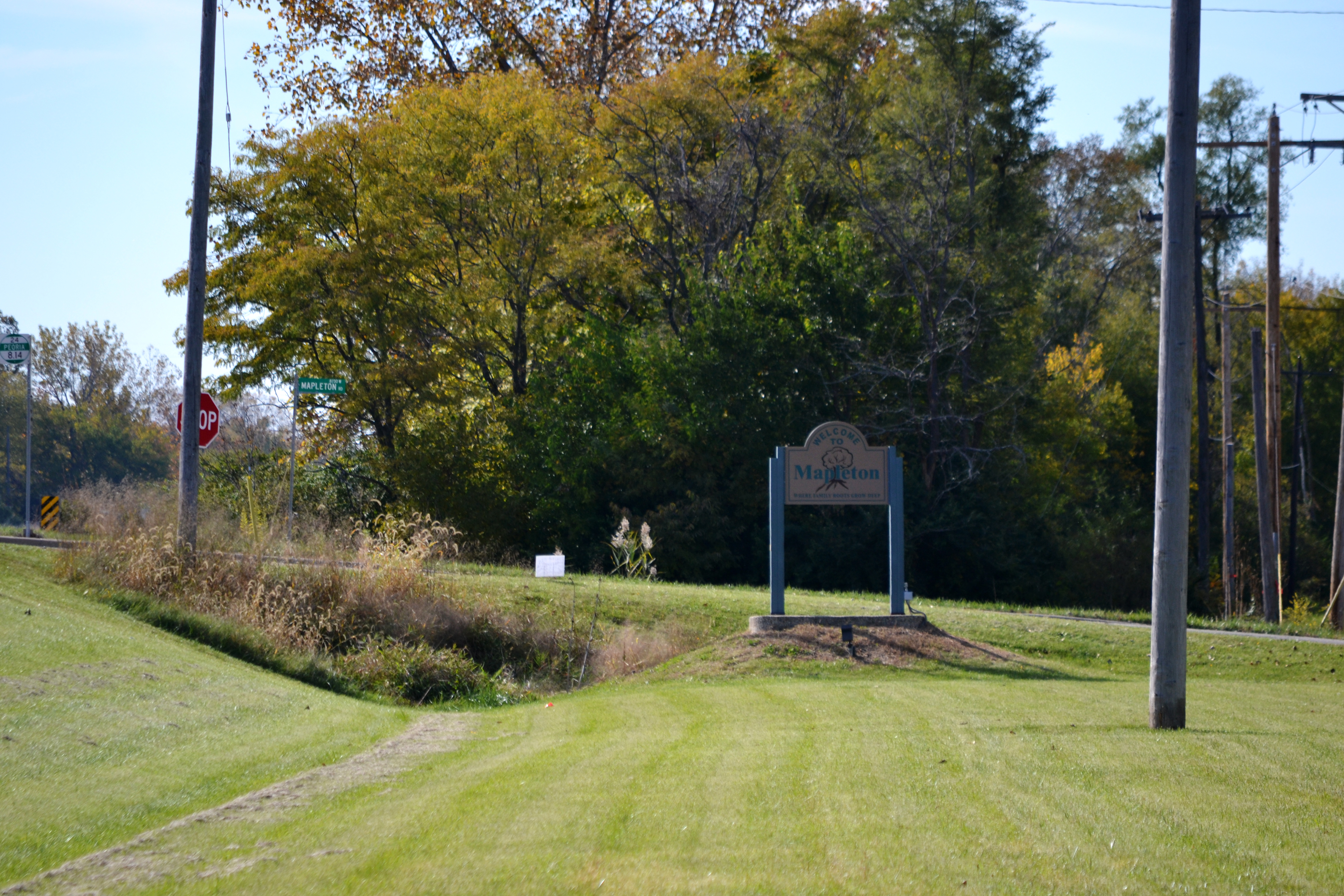
- Mapleton sign from US Route 24

- Location of Mapleton in Peoria County, Illinois.
- Coordinates: 40°34′23″N 89°43′29″W
- Country: United States
- State: Illinois
- County: Peoria
- Incorporated: 1872
- Founder: William T. Maple

Government
  - Mayor: Rhonda Hodges

Area
  - Total: 0.88 sq mi (2.29 km^{2})
  - Land: 0.88 sq mi (2.29 km^{2})
  - Water: 0 sq mi (0.00 km^{2})
- Elevation: 607 ft (185 m)

Population (2020)
  - Total: 261
  - Estimate (2024): 253
  - Density: 294.8/sq mi (113.82/km^{2})
- Time zone: UTC-6 (CST)
  - Summer (DST): UTC-5 (CDT)
- ZIP Code(s): 61547
- Area code: 309
- FIPS code: 17-46643
- GNIS feature ID: 2399249
- Website: www.mapletonillinois.com

Mapleton is a small village in Peoria County, Illinois, United States. As of the 2020 census, Mapleton had a population of 261. Mapleton is part of the Peoria, Illinois Metropolitan Statistical Area. There are four different plants in Mapleton, all located along U.S. Route 24: an Evonik chemical plant, an Arxada, LLC plant (formerly Lonza Group), a Caterpillar Inc. foundry, and an Ingredion facility.

== History ==
Mapleton was laid out in 1868 by William T. Maple, for whom it was named. Its post office was established on July 17, 1872.

== Geography ==
According to the 2010 census, Mapleton has a total area of 0.91 square miles (2.36 km^{2}), all land.

== Demographics ==
Historical population
Census	Pop.	Note	%±
1880	135		—
1960	309		—
1970	281		−9.1%
1980	255		−9.3%
1990	216		−15.3%
2000	227		5.1%
2010	270		18.9%
2020	261		−3.3%
U.S. Decennial Census

As of the census of 2000, there were 227 people, 100 households, and 57 families residing in the village. The population density was 316.1 inhabitants per square mile (122.0/km^{2}). There were 111 housing units at an average density of 154.6 per square mile (59.7/km^{2}). The racial makeup of the village was 96.92% White, 1.32% Native American, and 1.76% from two or more races.

There were 100 households, out of which 21.0% had children under the age of 18 living with them, 51.0% were married couples living together, 3.0% had a female householder with no husband present, and 43.0% were non-families. 36.0% of all households were made up of individuals, and 18.0% had someone living alone who was 65 years of age or older. The average household size was 2.27 and the average family size was 3.07.

In the village, the population was spread out, with 16.3% under the age of 18, 11.0% from 18 to 24, 30.0% from 25 to 44, 27.8% from 45 to 64, and 15.0% who were 65 years of age or older. The median age was 41 years. For every 100 females, there were 122.5 males. For every 100 females age 18 and over, there were 118.4 males.

The median income for a household in the village was $45,357, and the median income for a family was $63,750. Males had a median income of $35,208 versus $19,423 for females. The per capita income for the village was $22,728. About 3.3% of families and 6.6% of the population were below the poverty line, including none of those under the age of 18 or 65 or over.

== Education ==
The school district is Illini Bluffs Community Unit School District 327.
