= Hallock Township, Peoria County, Illinois =

Coordinates: 40°55′41″N 89°35′18″W

Hallock Township
- Township
- Location in Peoria County

- Peoria County's location in Illinois
- Country: United States
- State: Illinois
- County: Peoria
- Established: November 6, 1849

Government
  - Supervisor: Kevin Lee Peterson

Area
  - Total: 36.19 sq mi (93.7 km^{2})
  - Land: 36.15 sq mi (93.6 km^{2})
  - Water: 0.03 sq mi (0.078 km^{2}) 0.08%

Population (2010)
  - Estimate (2016): 1,594
  - Density: 44.3/sq mi (17.1/km^{2})
- Time zone: UTC-6 (CST)
  - Summer (DST): UTC-5 (CDT)
- FIPS code: 17-143-32304

Hallock Township is located in Peoria County, Illinois, United States. As of the 2010 census, its population was 1,600 and it contained 619 housing units.

== Geography ==
According to the 2010 census, the township has a total area of 36.19 square miles (93.7 km^{2}), of which 36.15 square miles (93.6 km^{2}) (or 99.89%) is land and 0.03 square miles (0.078 km^{2}) (or 0.08%) is water.

== Demographics ==
Historical population
Census	Pop.	Note	%±
2016 (est.)	1,594
U.S. Decennial Census
