= Dunlap, Illinois =

Dunlap
- Village
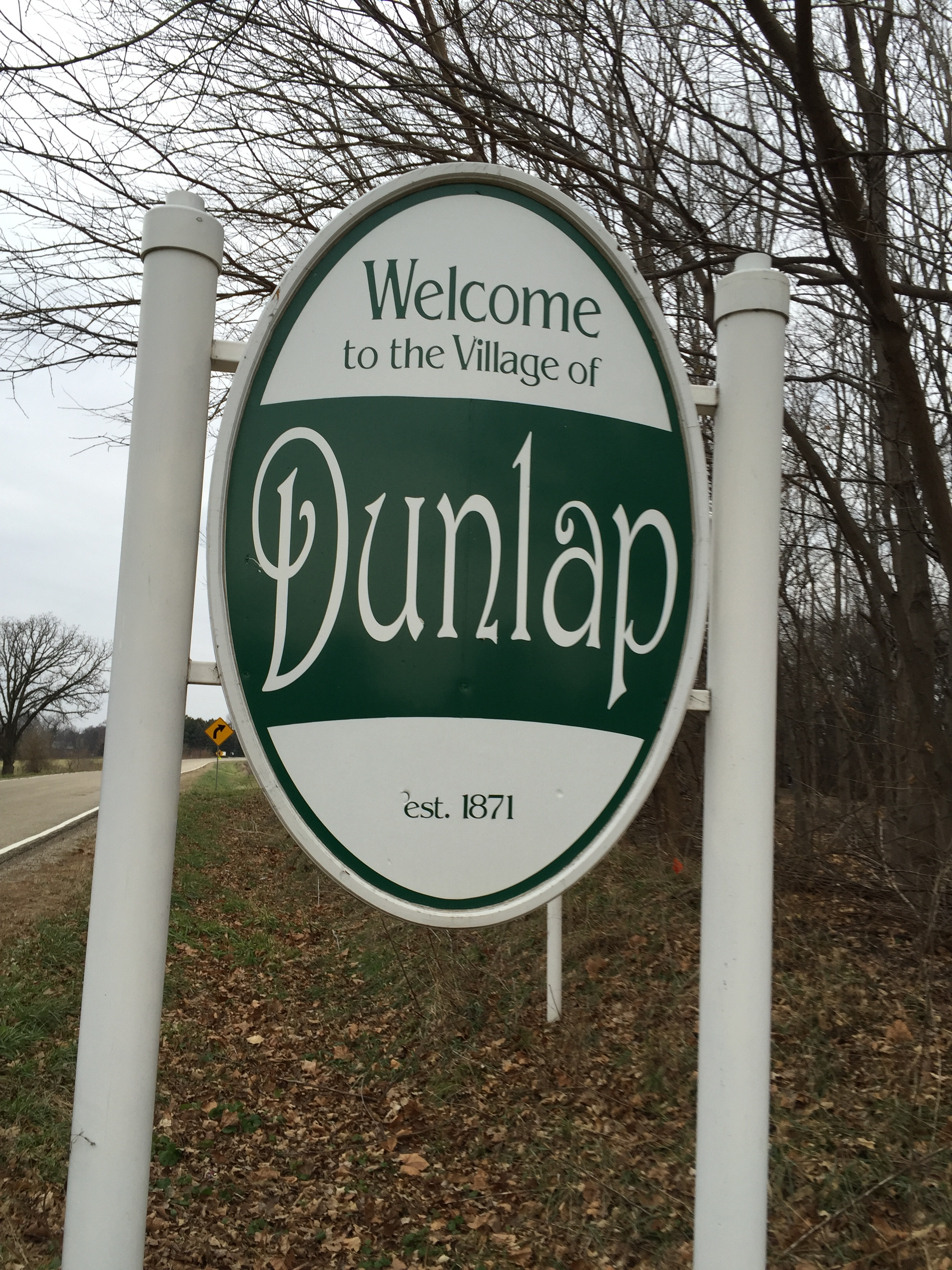
- Dunlap welcome sign

- Location of Dunlap in Peoria County, Illinois.
- Coordinates: 40°50′43″N 89°40′33″W
- Country: United States
- State: Illinois
- County: Peoria
- Township: Radnor
- Founded: June 12, 1871
- Founder: Alva Dunlap

Government
  - Mayor: Roger Nelson

Area
  - Total: 2.78 sq mi (7.21 km^{2})
  - Land: 2.78 sq mi (7.21 km^{2})
  - Water: 0 sq mi (0.00 km^{2})
- Elevation: 659 ft (201 m)

Population (2020)
  - Total: 1,603
  - Estimate (2024): 1,596
  - Density: 575.7/sq mi (222.29/km^{2})
- Time zone: UTC-6 (CST)
  - Summer (DST): UTC-5 (CDT)
- ZIP Code: 61525
- Area code: 309
- FIPS code: 17-21176
- GNIS ID: 2398757
- Website: www.villageofdunlap-il.gov

Dunlap is a village in Peoria County, Illinois, United States. As of the 2020 census, Dunlap had a population of 1,603. Dunlap is part of the Peoria metropolitan area and growth in the city of Peoria is extending towards the village. There are only a handful of businesses in the village's 16 blocks.

== History ==
The town of Dunlap was officially established on June 12, 1871, on 40 acres of land owned by Alva Dunlap. The site of his former home is now occupied by the Prospect United Methodist Church. The town was originally located along the Rock Island Railroad. A post office has been in operation at Dunlap since 1871.

The Dunlap Volunteer Fire Department and Rescue Squad was established in 1899. Police services are provided by the Peoria County Sheriff's Office. The meeting of the first Dunlap Village Council was on January 7, 1952, and the town petitioned for incorporation on February 19, 1952. The current Village Hall was built in 1995.

== Geography ==
According to the 2010 census, Dunlap has a total area of 0.54 square miles (1.40 km^{2}), all land.

== Demographics ==
Historical population
Census	Pop.	Note	%±
1880	146		—
1960	564		—
1970	656		16.3%
1980	824		25.6%
1990	851		3.3%
2000	926		8.8%
2010	1,386		49.7%
2020	1,603		15.7%
U.S. Decennial Census

Dunlap is a suburb of Peoria, IL and it is 15 miles from downtown.

=== 2020 census ===
As of the 2020 census, Dunlap had a population of 1,603. The median age was 39.2 years. 28.5% of residents were under the age of 18 and 14.2% of residents were 65 years of age or older. For every 100 females there were 94.5 males, and for every 100 females age 18 and over there were 90.7 males age 18 and over.

0.0% of residents lived in urban areas, while 100.0% lived in rural areas.

There were 573 households in Dunlap, of which 44.2% had children under the age of 18 living in them. Of all households, 63.4% were married-couple households, 11.0% were households with a male householder and no spouse or partner present, and 19.7% were households with a female householder and no spouse or partner present. About 15.0% of all households were made up of individuals and 7.0% had someone living alone who was 65 years of age or older.

There were 597 housing units, of which 4.0% were vacant. The homeowner vacancy rate was 1.4% and the rental vacancy rate was 8.5%.

Racial composition as of the 2020 census
Race	Number	Percent
White	1,368	85.3%
Black or African American	46	2.9%
American Indian and Alaska Native	0	0.0%
Asian	88	5.5%
Native Hawaiian and Other Pacific Islander	2	0.1%
Some other race	8	0.5%
Two or more races	91	5.7%
Hispanic or Latino (of any race)	54	3.4%

=== 2000 census ===
As of the census of 2000, there were 926 people, 337 households, and 270 families residing in the suburb. The population density was 2,482.3 inhabitants per square mile (958.4/km^{2}). There were 350 housing units at an average density of 938.2 per square mile (362.2/km^{2}). The racial makeup of the village was 98.52% White, 0.54% African American, 0.22% Native American, 0.51% Asian, and 0.22% from two or more races. Hispanic or Latino of any race were 1.30% of the population.

There were 337 households, out of which 40.7% had children under the age of 18 living with them, 64.7% were married couples living together, 11.6% had a female householder with no husband present, and 19.6% were non-families. 16.0% of all households were made up of individuals, and 6.5% had someone living alone who was 65 years of age or older. The average household size was 2.75 and the average family size was 3.08.

In the village, the population was spread out, with 27.1% under the age of 18, 9.6% from 18 to 24, 29.9% from 25 to 44, 23.8% from 45 to 64, and 9.6% who were 65 years of age or older. The median age was 35 years. For every 100 females, there were 102.2 males. For every 100 females age 18 and over, there were 92.9 males.

The median income for a household in the village was $56,364, and the median income for a family was $62,000. Males had a median income of $42,083 versus $24,732 for females. The per capita income for the village was $20,407. About 3.1% of families and 6.3% of the population were below the poverty line, including 7.9% of those under age 18 and 12.5% of those age 65 or over.

== Education ==
Dunlap Community Unit School District 323 is the school district covering Dunlap. Schools in Dunlap Community Unit School District 323 include:

- Banner Elementary School (K-5)
- Dunlap Grade School Grades (K-5)
- Dunlap High School Grades (9–12)
- Dunlap Middle School Grades (6–8)
- Dunlap Valley Middle School Grades (6–8)
- Hickory Grove Elementary School Grades (K-5)
- Ridgeview Elementary School Grades (K-5)
- Wilder-Waite Grade School Grades (K-5)
