= Trivoli Township, Peoria County, Illinois =

Coordinates: 40°40′02″N 89°55′58″W

Trivoli Township
- Township
- Location in Peoria County

- Peoria County's location in Illinois
- Country: United States
- State: Illinois
- County: Peoria
- Established: November 6, 1849

Area
  - Total: 35.96 sq mi (93.1 km^{2})
  - Land: 35.91 sq mi (93.0 km^{2})
  - Water: 0.05 sq mi (0.13 km^{2}) 0.14%

Population (2010)
  - Estimate (2016): 1,012
  - Density: 28.4/sq mi (11.0/km^{2})
- Time zone: UTC-6 (CST)
  - Summer (DST): UTC-5 (CDT)
- FIPS code: 17-143-76121

Trivoli Township is located in Peoria County, Illinois. As of the 2010 census, its population was 1,021 and it contained 447 housing units.

== Geography ==
According to the 2010 census, the township has a total area of 35.96 square miles (93.1 km^{2}), of which 35.91 square miles (93.0 km^{2}) (or 99.86%) is land and 0.05 square miles (0.13 km^{2}) (or 0.14%) is water.

== Demographics ==
Historical population
Census	Pop.	Note	%±
2016 (est.)	1,012
U.S. Decennial Census
