= Timber Township, Peoria County, Illinois =

Coordinates: 40°34′39″N 89°49′07″W

Timber Township
- Township
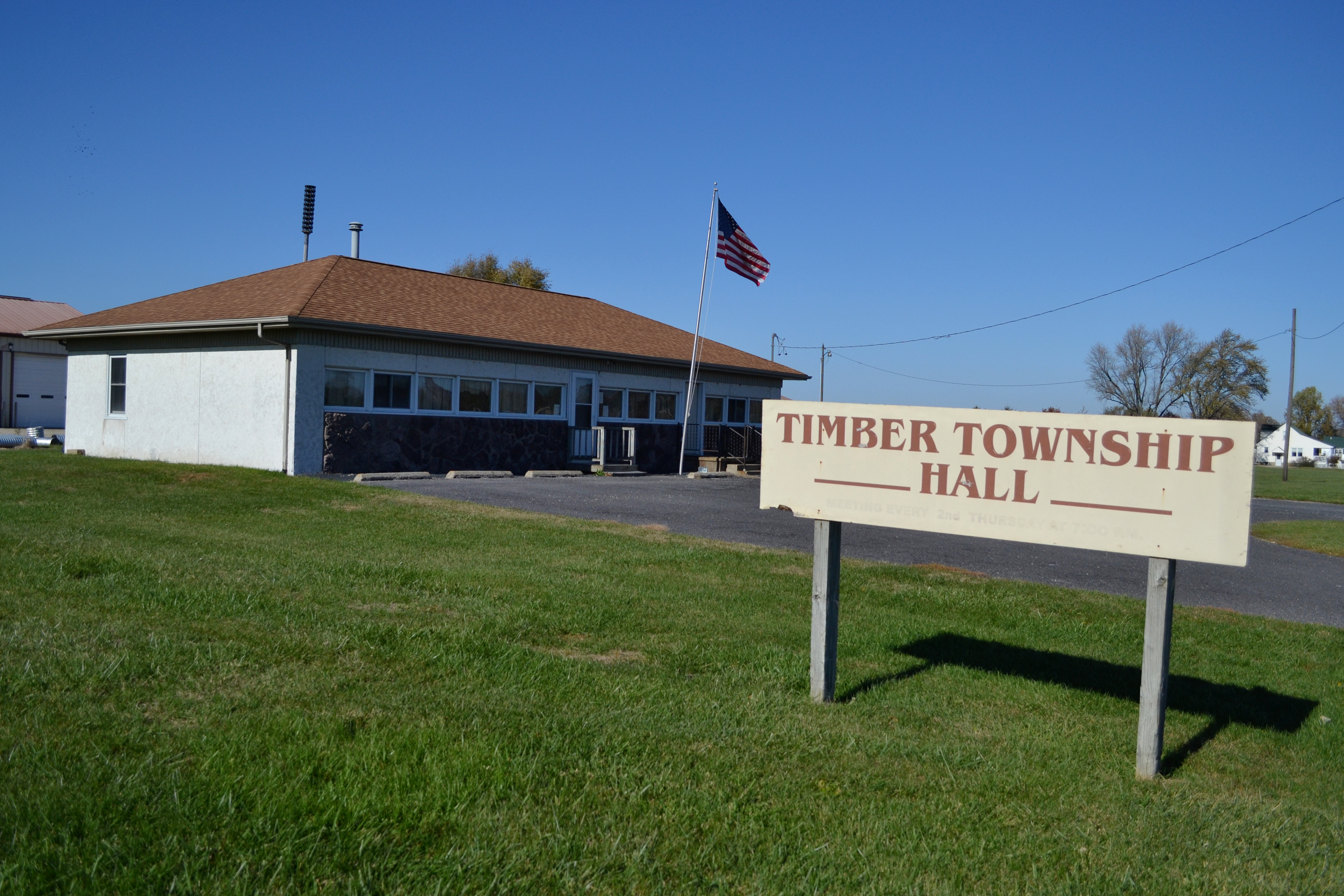
- Timber Township Hall, 2023

- Location in Peoria County

- Peoria County's location in Illinois
- Country: United States
- State: Illinois
- County: Peoria
- Established: November 6, 1849

Area
  - Total: 36.81 sq mi (95.3 km^{2})
  - Land: 35.81 sq mi (92.7 km^{2})
  - Water: 1 sq mi (2.6 km^{2}) 2.72%

Population (2010)
  - Estimate (2016): 2,471
  - Density: 70.1/sq mi (27.1/km^{2})
- Time zone: UTC-6 (CST)
  - Summer (DST): UTC-5 (CDT)
- FIPS code: 17-143-75289

Timber Township is located in Peoria County, Illinois. As of the 2010 census, its population was 2,511 and it contained 1,077 housing units.

== Geography ==
According to the 2010 census, the township has a total area of 36.81 square miles (95.3 km^{2}), of which 35.81 square miles (92.7 km^{2}) (or 97.28%) is land and 1 square mile (2.6 km^{2}) (or 2.72%) is water.

== Demographics ==
Historical population
| Census | Pop. | Note | %± |
|---|---|---|---|
| 2016 (est.) | 2,471 |
U.S. Decennial Census
