= Akron Township, Peoria County, Illinois =

Akron Township
- Township
- Location in Peoria County

- Peoria County's location in Illinois
- Coordinates: 40°55′43″N 89°41′15″W
- Country: United States
- State: Illinois
- County: Peoria
- Established: November 6, 1849

Area
  - Total: 36.48 sq mi (94.5 km^{2})
  - Land: 36.37 sq mi (94.2 km^{2})
  - Water: 0.11 sq mi (0.28 km^{2}) 0.30%

Population (2020)
  - Total: 1,025
  - Density: 29.4/sq mi (11.4/km^{2})
- Time zone: UTC-6 (CST)
  - Summer (DST): UTC-5 (CDT)
- FIPS code: 17-143-00477

Akron Township is located in Peoria County, Illinois, United States. As of the 2020 census, its population was 1,025 and it contained 408 housing units. The village of Princeville is partially located in Akron Township along its western border.

== Geography ==
According to the 2010 census, the township has a total area of 36.48 square miles (94.5 km^{2}), of which 36.37 square miles (94.2 km^{2}) (or 99.70%) is land and 0.11 square miles (0.28 km^{2}) (or 0.30%) is water.

== Demographics ==
Historical population
Census	Pop.	Note	%±
2020	1,025		—
U.S. Decennial Census
