= Peoria metropolitan area =

Geographic area around Peoria, Illinois

Peoria Metropolitan Area
- Combined Statistical Area
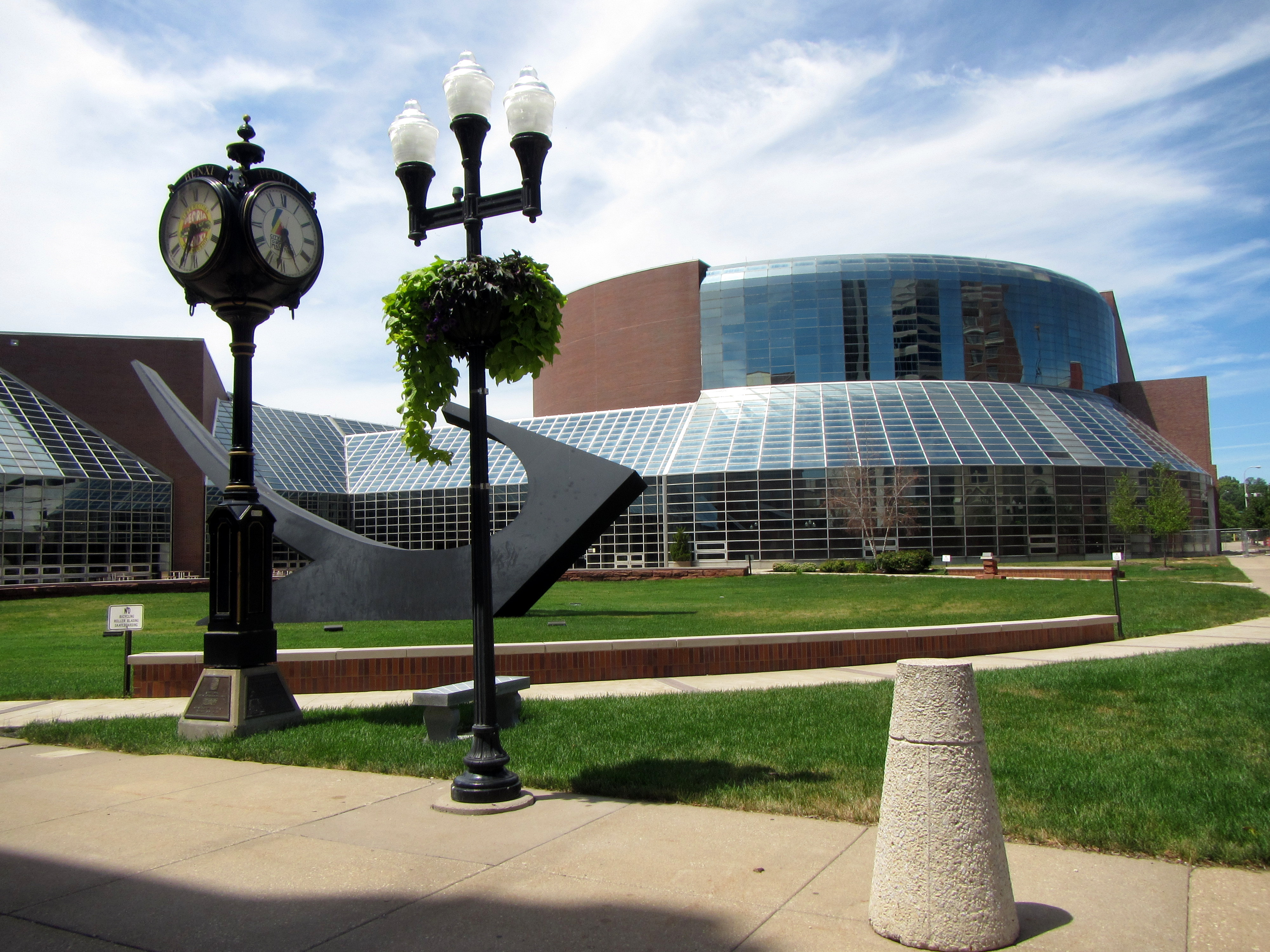
- Peoria Civic Center
Interactive Map of Peoria–Canton, IL CSA
Peoria, IL MSA
Canton, IL µSA
City of Peoria
- Country: United States
- State: Illinois
- Largest city: Peoria
- Other cities: East Peoria; Morton; Pekin; Washington; Canton

Area
  - Total: 8,810 km^{2} (3,400 sq mi)

Population
  - Total: 368,782

GDP
  - Metro: $26.282 billion (2022)
  - Total: $30.556 billion (2022)
- Time zone: UTC−6 (CST)
  - Summer (DST): UTC−5 (CDT)

The Peoria, IL Metropolitan Statistical Area, as defined by the U.S Office of Management and Budget, is a metropolitan area consisting of five counties in Central Illinois, anchored by the city of Peoria. As of the 2020 census, the area has a population of 368,782, decreasing to an estimated 363,505 in 2025. The metropolitan statistical area is the third largest in Illinois, behind Chicago and St. Louis, and the 156th largest in the United States. The MSA is a component of the broader Peoria–Canton, IL Combined Statistical Area, which also includes the Canton, IL micropolitan area (Fulton County) and has an estimated population of 396,406 in 2025.

== Counties ==
County	Seat	2025 estimate	2020 Census	Change	Area	Density
Peoria	Peoria	178,553	181,830	−1.80%	631 sq mi (1,630 km^{2})	283/sq mi (109/km^{2})
Tazewell	Pekin	130,049	131,343	−0.99%	658 sq mi (1,700 km^{2})	198/sq mi (76/km^{2})
Woodford	Eureka	38,111	38,467	−0.93%	543 sq mi (1,410 km^{2})	70/sq mi (27/km^{2})
Marshall	Lacon	11,473	11,742	−2.29%	399 sq mi (1,030 km^{2})	29/sq mi (11/km^{2})
Stark	Toulon	5,319	5,400	−1.50%	288 sq mi (750 km^{2})	18/sq mi (7/km^{2})
Total		363,505	368,782	−1.43%	2,519 sq mi (6,520 km^{2})	144/sq mi (56/km^{2})

== Communities ==
Historical population
Census	Pop.	Note	%±
1900	121,629		—
1910	134,282		10.4%
1920	150,250		11.9%
1930	187,426		24.7%
1940	211,736		13.0%
1950	250,512		18.3%
1960	334,898		33.7%
1970	362,791		8.3%
1980	387,732		6.9%
1990	358,552		−7.5%
2000	366,899		2.3%
2010	379,186		3.3%
2020	368,782		−2.7%
U.S. Decennial Census

=== Places with more than 100,000 inhabitants ===
- Peoria (principal city)

=== Places with 10,000 to 40,000 inhabitants ===
- East Peoria
- Morton
- Pekin
- Washington
- Canton

=== Places with 2,500 to 10,000 inhabitants ===
- Bartonville
- Chillicothe
- Creve Coeur
- Germantown Hills
- El Paso (partial)
- Eureka
- Henry
- Marquette Heights
- Metamora
- Peoria Heights
- West Peoria

=== Places with 1,000 to 2,500 inhabitants ===
- Bellevue
- Delavan
- Dunlap
- Elmwood
- Farmington
- Glasford
- Hanna City
- Lacon
- Mackinaw
- Minier
- Minonk
- North Pekin
- Princeville
- Roanoke
- Rome (census-designated place)
- South Pekin
- Tremont
- Toluca
- Toulon
- Washburn
- Wenona (partial)
- Wyoming

=== Places with fewer than 1,000 inhabitants ===
- Armington
- Bay View Gardens
- Benson
- Bradford
- Brimfield
- Congerville
- Deer Creek
- Goodfield
- Green Valley
- Hopedale
- Hopewell
- Kappa
- Kingston Mines
- La Fayette
- La Rose
- Mapleton
- Norwood
- Panola
- Secor
- Sparland
- Spring Bay
- Varna

=== Unincorporated places ===
- Alta
- Broadmoor
- Camp Grove
- Castleton
- Cramers
- Edelstein
- Edgewater
- Edwards
- El Vista
- Elmore
- Galena Knolls
- Groveland
- High Meadows
- Holmes Center
- Hopewell Estates
- Komatsu Dresser
- Lake Camelot
- Lake Lancelot
- Lake of the Woods
- Laura
- Lawn Ridge
- Leeds
- Lombardville
- Lowpoint
- Mardell Manor
- Modena
- Monica
- Mossville
- North Hampton
- Oak Hill
- Oak Ridge
- Orchard Mines
- Pattonsburg
- Pottstown
- Renchville
- Rome Heights
- Saratoga Center
- Saxton
- Smithville
- South Rome
- Southport
- Speer
- Spires
- Tuscarora
- Vets Row
- Vonachen Knolls
- West Hallock
- Wilbern

== Townships ==
- Akron
- Bartonville
- Bell Plain
- Bennington
- Boynton
- Brimfield
- Cazenovia
- Chillicothe
- Cincinnati
- Clayton
- Cruger
- Deer Creek
- Delavan
- Dillon
- El Paso
- Elm Grove
- Elmira
- Elmwood
- Essex
- Evans
- Fondulac
- Goshen
- Greene
- Groveland
- Hallock
- Henry
- Hittle
- Hollis
- Hopedale
- Hopewell
- Jubilee
- Kansas
- Kickapoo
- La Prairie
- Lacon
- Limestone
- Linn
- Little Mackinaw
- Logan
- Mackinaw
- Malone
- Medina
- Metamora
- Millbrook
- Minonk
- Montgomery
- Morton
- Olio
- Osceola
- Palestine
- Panola
- Partridge
- Pekin
- Penn
- Princeville
- Radnor
- Richland
- Richwoods
- Roanoke
- Roberts
- Rosefield
- Sand Prairie
- Saratoga
- Spring Bay
- Spring Lake
- Steuben
- Timber
- Toulon
- Tremont
- Trivoli
- Valley
- Washington
- West Jersey
- West Peoria
- Whitefield
- Worth

== Demographics ==
As of the census of 2020, there were 402,391 people within the MSA. The racial makeup of the MSA was 88.54% White, 8.40% African American, 0.23% Native American, 1.05% Asian, 0.02% Pacific Islander, 0.59% from other races, and 1.18% from two or more races. Hispanic or Latino of any race were 1.52% of the population.

The median income for a household in the MSA was $42,805, and the median income for a family was $50,756. Males had a median income of $38,135 versus $23,793 for females. The per capita income for the MSA was $20,104.

== Combined Statistical Area ==
The Peoria–Canton Combined Statistical Area is made up of six counties in central Illinois. The statistical area includes one metropolitan area and one micropolitan area. As of the 2000 Census, the CSA had a population of 405,149 (though a July 1, 2009 estimate placed the population at 412,517). As of the 2020 census it had a population of 401,867.

- Metropolitan Statistical Area (MSA)
  - Peoria (Marshall, Peoria, Stark, Tazewell, and Woodford Counties)
- Micropolitan Statistical Area (μSA)
  - Canton (Fulton County)

Statistical Area	2025 estimate	2020 Census	Change	Area	Density
Peoria, IL Metropolitan Statistical Area	363,505	368,782	−1.43%	2,519 sq mi (6,520 km^{2})	144/sq mi (56/km^{2})
Canton, IL Micropolitan Statistical Area	32,901	33,609	−2.11%	883 sq mi (2,290 km^{2})	37/sq mi (14/km^{2})
Total	396,406	402,391	−1.49%	3,402 sq mi (8,810 km^{2})	117/sq mi (45/km^{2})

== See also ==
- Illinois census statistical areas
