= Toluca, Illinois =

- City
- Flag

- Location in Marshall County, Illinois
- Coordinates: 41°00′05″N 89°07′42″W
- Country: United States
- State: Illinois
- County: Marshall
- Townships: Bennington, Evans
- Established: 1887
- Named for: Toluca

Area
  - Total: 1.06 sq mi (2.75 km^{2})
  - Land: 1.06 sq mi (2.75 km^{2})
  - Water: 0 sq mi (0.00 km^{2})
- Elevation: 689 ft (210 m)

Population (2020)
  - Total: 1,340
  - Estimate (2024): 1,321
  - Density: 1,261.7/sq mi (487.13/km^{2})
- Time zone: UTC-6 (CST)
  - Summer (DST): UTC-5 (CDT)
- ZIP Code: 61369
- FIPS code: 17-75653
- GNIS feature ID: 2397034
- Website: tolucaillinois.com

Toluca is a city in Marshall County, Illinois, United States. The population was 1,340 at the 2020 census. It is part of the Peoria, Illinois, Metropolitan Statistical Area.

== History ==
Toluca was established in 1887 as a stop on the Atchison, Topeka, and Santa Fe Railway, on land owned by Marshall County native William Twist. In that year, local farmers led by Twist requested that the railroad make Toluca a regular stop. Their request was granted. With the backing of a Chicago firm, a grain elevator was built and maintained by Thomas Colehower of Long Point, Illinois. Colehower built the first house in the area of Toluca now called Old Town. In 1892, the Devlin Coal Company began mining coal at Toluca. Its first post office was established on September 21, 1888. The city's name derives from Toluca de Lerdo, Mexico, purportedly given by Mexican workers building the railroad on which Toluca was founded.

The population of Toluca increased, and by 1894 it was incorporated as a city. Its growth continued, fueled by immigrants from Poland, Italy, and Lithuania who came to work in the coal mines. In 1900, it had approximately 2,629 inhabitants. But by 1924, the coal mines were unprofitable and they closed down. The population shrank drastically as a result.

Miners from Toluca led a mob for the lynching of F. W. Stewart at Lacon on November 7, 1898.

== Geography ==
Toluca is located in eastern Marshall County. Illinois Route 117 passes through the city as Main Street and Santa Fe Avenue, leading north 2 miles (3 km) to Illinois Route 17 and south 16 miles (26 km) to Roanoke. Via Route 17, Wenona is 8 miles (13 km) to the northeast and Lacon, the Marshall county seat, is 16 miles (26 km) to the west.

According to the U.S. Census Bureau, Toluca has a total area of 1.06 square miles (2.75 km^{2}), all land. The North Branch of Crow Creek runs through the south side of the city, flowing west to Crow Creek and eventually the Illinois River.

On June 11, 2026, the city was hit by a large tornado, which prompted a tornado emergency.

== Demographics ==
Historical population
Census	Pop.	Note	%±
1900	2,629		—
1910	2,407		−8.4%
1920	2,503		4.0%
1930	1,413		−43.5%
1940	1,433		1.4%
1950	1,419		−1.0%
1960	1,352		−4.7%
1970	1,319		−2.4%
1980	1,471		11.5%
1990	1,315		−10.6%
2000	1,339		1.8%
2010	1,414		5.6%
2020	1,340		−5.2%
U.S. Decennial Census

=== 2020 census ===
As of the 2020 census, Toluca had a population of 1,340. The median age was 45.8 years. 22.2% of residents were under the age of 18 and 23.0% of residents were 65 years of age or older. For every 100 females there were 94.8 males, and for every 100 females age 18 and over there were 96.6 males age 18 and over.

0.0% of residents lived in urban areas, while 100.0% lived in rural areas.

There were 555 households in Toluca, of which 25.9% had children under the age of 18 living in them. Of all households, 42.9% were married-couple households, 19.8% were households with a male householder and no spouse or partner present, and 26.8% were households with a female householder and no spouse or partner present. About 32.5% of all households were made up of individuals and 16.9% had someone living alone who was 65 years of age or older.

There were 632 housing units, of which 12.2% were vacant. The homeowner vacancy rate was 2.1% and the rental vacancy rate was 19.7%.

Racial composition as of the 2020 census
Race	Number	Percent
White	1,203	89.8%
Black or African American	20	1.5%
American Indian and Alaska Native	0	0.0%
Asian	7	0.5%
Native Hawaiian and Other Pacific Islander	0	0.0%
Some other race	35	2.6%
Two or more races	75	5.6%
Hispanic or Latino (of any race)	89	6.6%

=== 2000 census ===
As of the census of 2000, there were 1,339 people, 581 households, and 343 families residing in the city. The population density was 1,260.9 inhabitants per square mile (486.8/km^{2}). There were 633 housing units at an average density of 596.1 units per square mile (230.2 units/km^{2}). The racial makeup of the city was 94.13% White, 5.07% African American, 0.07% Native American, 0.37% Asian, 0.60% from other races, and 0.75% from two or more races. Hispanic or Latino of any race were 0% of the population.

There were 581 households, out of which 25.6% had children under the age of 18 living with them, 48.7% were married couples living together, 7.7% had a female householder with no husband present, and 40.8% were non-families. 35.3% of all households were made up of individuals, and 19.6% had someone living alone who was 65 years of age or older. The average household size was 2.16 and the average family size was 2.81.

In the city, the population was spread out, with 20.9% under the age of 18, 5.8% from 18 to 24, 25.5% from 25 to 44, 20.9% from 45 to 64, and 26.8% who were 65 years of age or older. The median age was 43 years. For every 100 females, there were 81.7 males. For every 100 females age 18 and over, there were 78.6 males.

The median income for a household in the city was $37,072, and the median income for a family was $45,956. Males had a median income of $31,964 versus $23,558 for females. The per capita income for the city was $20,243. About 4.8% of families and 6.5% of the population were below the poverty line, including 7.2% of those under age 18 and 5.6% of those age 65 or over.

== Notable person ==
- Ernani Bernardi, big-band musician and member of the Los Angeles City Council, 1961–93
