= Sparland, Illinois =

- Village
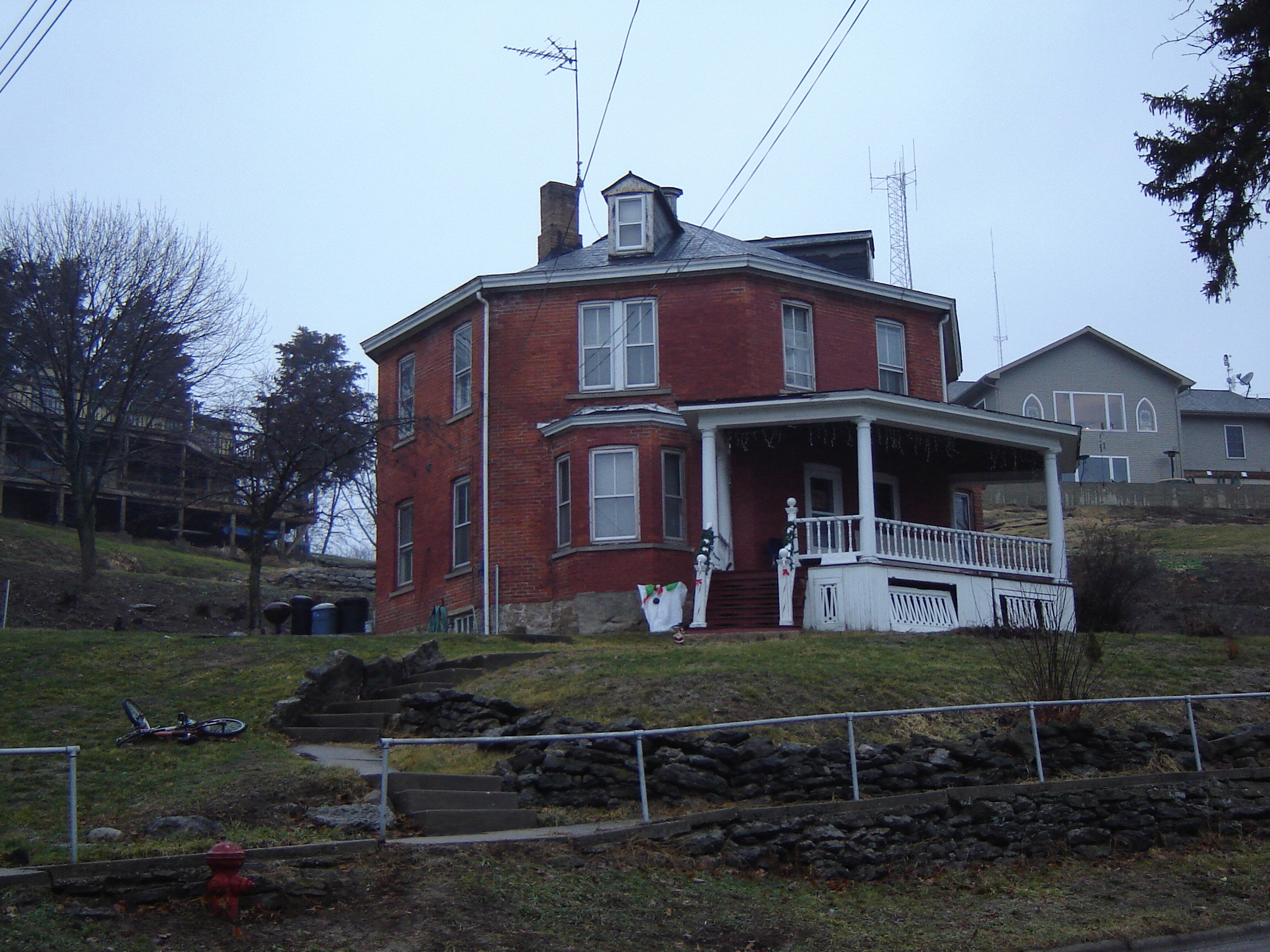
- The historic Robert Waugh House on School Street

- Location in Marshall County, Illinois
- Coordinates: 41°01′47″N 89°26′28″W
- Country: United States
- State: Illinois
- County: Marshall
- Township: Steuben

Area
  - Total: 0.57 sq mi (1.48 km^{2})
  - Land: 0.57 sq mi (1.48 km^{2})
  - Water: 0 sq mi (0.00 km^{2})
- Elevation: 591 ft (180 m)

Population (2020)
  - Total: 366
  - Density: 639.6/sq mi (246.95/km^{2})
- Time zone: UTC-6 (CST)
  - Summer (DST): UTC-5 (CDT)
- ZIP code: 61565
- Area code: 309
- FIPS code: 17-71422
- GNIS feature ID: 2399866
- Website: sparland.municipalimpact.com

Sparland is a village in Marshall County, Illinois, United States. The population was 366 at the 2020 census, down from 406 in 2010. It is part of the Peoria Metropolitan Statistical Area.

== Geography ==
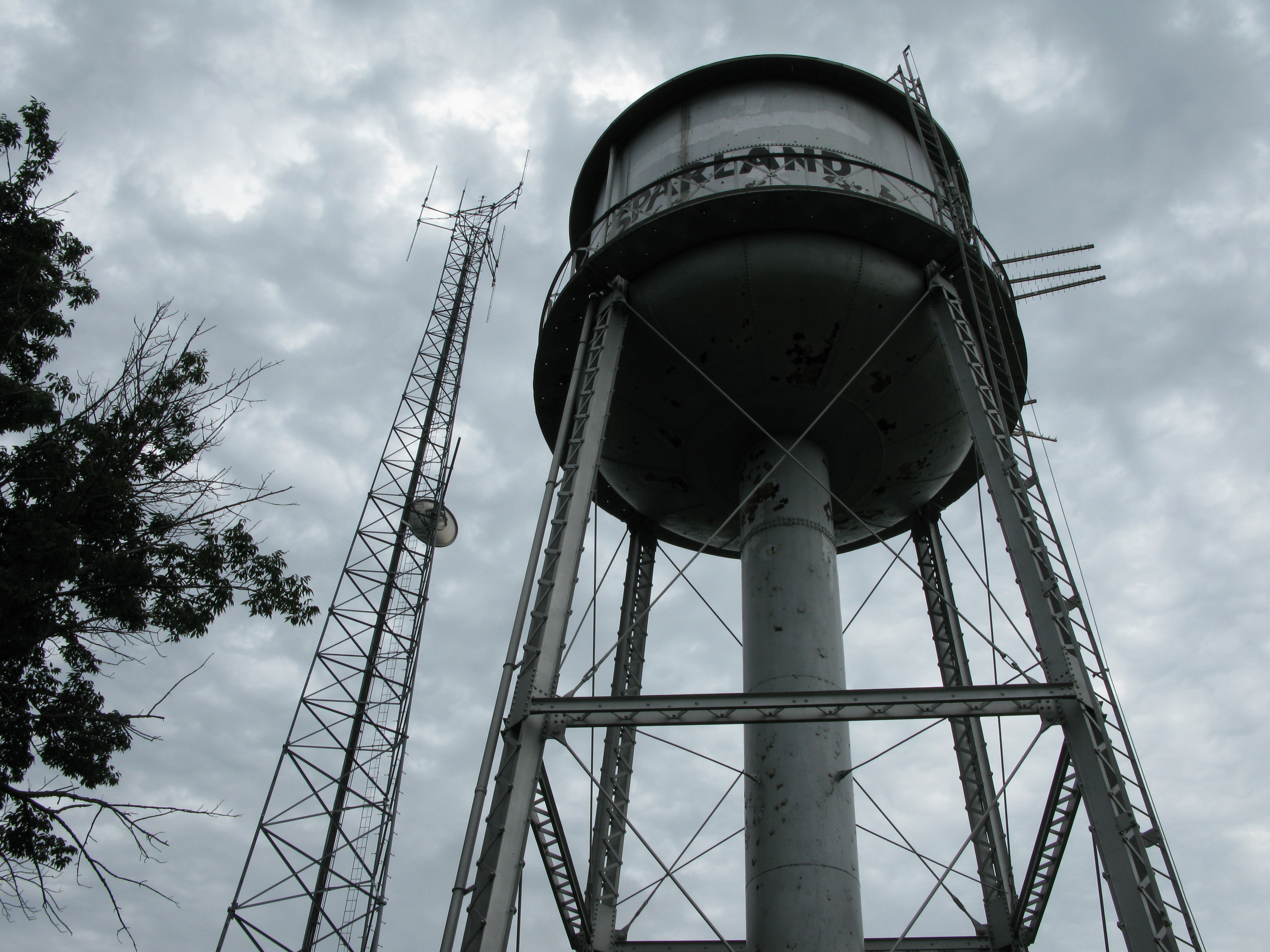
The highest part of Sparland is dominated by electricity pylons and the transmitter tower.

Sparland is in western Marshall County, on the west side of the Illinois River. The Lacon Bridge carrying Illinois Route 17 connects Sparland with Lacon, the Marshall county seat. IL 17 leads east 22 miles (35 km) to Wenona and west 21 miles (34 km) to Wyoming. Illinois Route 29 runs through Sparland as Railroad Street, leading northeast up the Illinois River valley 7 miles (11 km) to Henry and southwest (downriver) 8 miles (13 km) to Chillicothe.

According to the U.S. Census Bureau, Sparland has a total area of 0.57 square miles (1.48 km^{2}), all land. The west side of Sparland is located on a high bluff 175 feet (53 m) above the Illinois River.

== Demographics ==
Historical population
Census	Pop.	Note	%±
1870	558		—
1880	375		−32.8%
1890	471		25.6%
1900	459		−2.5%
1910	461		0.4%
1920	437		−5.2%
1930	463		5.9%
1940	509		9.9%
1950	509		0.0%
1960	534		4.9%
1970	585		9.6%
1980	624		6.7%
1990	412		−34.0%
2000	504		22.3%
2010	406		−19.4%
2020	366		−9.9%
U.S. Decennial Census

As of the census of 2000, there were 504 people, 185 households, and 143 families residing in the village. The population density was 865.3 inhabitants per square mile (334.1/km^{2}). There were 204 housing units at an average density of 350.2 per square mile (135.2/km^{2}). The racial makeup of the village was 99.01% White, 0.40% from other races, and 0.60% from two or more races. Hispanic or Latino of any race were 1.59% of the population.

There were 185 households, out of which 34.1% had children under the age of 18 living with them, 65.4% were married couples living together, 7.6% had a female householder with no husband present, and 22.2% were non-families. 18.9% of all households were made up of individuals, and 7.6% had someone living alone who was 65 years of age or older. The average household size was 2.72 and the average family size was 3.04.

In the village, the population was spread out, with 26.2% under the age of 18, 8.9% from 18 to 24, 28.8% from 25 to 44, 21.6% from 45 to 64, and 14.5% who were 65 years of age or older. The median age was 34 years. For every 100 females, there were 107.4 males. For every 100 females age 18 and over, there were 110.2 males.

The median income for a household in the village was $32,019, and the median income for a family was $36,750. Males had a median income of $24,063 versus $19,028 for females. The per capita income for the village was $13,924. About 3.7% of the families and 5.8% of the population were below the poverty line, including 8.2% of those under age 18 and none of those aged 65 or over.
