= Varna, Illinois =

- Village
- Location in Marshall County, Illinois
- Coordinates: 41°02′07″N 89°13′28″W
- Country: United States
- State: Illinois
- County: Marshall
- Township: Roberts

Area
  - Total: 0.30 sq mi (0.77 km^{2})
  - Land: 0.30 sq mi (0.77 km^{2})
  - Water: 0 sq mi (0 km^{2})
- Elevation: 725 ft (221 m)

Population (2020)
  - Total: 375
  - Density: 1,263.7/sq mi (487.93/km^{2})
- Time zone: UTC-6 (CST)
  - Summer (DST): UTC-5 (CDT)
- ZIP code: 61375
- Area code: 309
- FIPS code: 17-77395
- GNIS feature ID: 2400049
- Website: villageofvarna.com

Varna is a village in Marshall County, Illinois, United States. The population was 375 at the 2020 census. It is part of the Peoria Metropolitan Statistical Area.

The village was named for Varna, Bulgaria.

== Geography ==
Varna is in eastern Marshall County, northeast of the intersection of Illinois Routes 17 and 89. IL 89 passes through the west side of the village as Pine Street, leading north 6 miles (10 km) to Magnolia and south 4 miles (6 km) to La Rose. IL 17 runs along the southern border of the village, about half a mile south of the village center; it leads west 9 miles (14 km) to Lacon, the Marshall county seat, and east 11 miles (18 km) to Wenona.

According to the U.S. Census Bureau, Varna has a total area of 0.30 square miles (0.78 km^{2}), all land. The village is drained to the west by tributaries of Shaw Creek and to the east by a tributary of Sandy Creek, part of the Illinois River watershed.

3 miles (5 km) northwest of Varna and within the village's postal zone is the 1,400-acre (570 ha) gated community of Lake Wildwood, which was developed in the 1970s around a man-made 220-acre (89 ha) lake on Shaw Creek. In September 2015, the Illinois Environmental Protection Agency completed a watershed management project to stabilize the source water of Shaw Creek and prevent natural sediment from entering the watershed.

== Demographics ==
Historical population
Census	Pop.	Note	%±
1880	286		—
1890	398		39.2%
1900	403		1.3%
1910	406		0.7%
1920	359		−11.6%
1930	343		−4.5%
1940	383		11.7%
1950	400		4.4%
1960	373		−6.7%
1970	417		11.8%
1980	441		5.8%
1990	405		−8.2%
2000	436		7.7%
2010	384		−11.9%
2020	375		−2.3%
U.S. Decennial Census

As of the census of 2000, there were 436 people, 177 households, and 138 families residing in the village. The population density was 1,488.2 inhabitants per square mile (574.6/km^{2}). There were 190 housing units at an average density of 648.5 per square mile (250.4/km^{2}). The racial makeup of the village was 98.85% White, 0.23% African American, 0.46% Native American, and 0.46% from two or more races. Hispanic or Latino of any race were 0.92% of the population.

There were 176 households, out of which 32.2% had children under the age of 18 living with them, 62.1% were married couples living together, 9.6% had a female householder with no husband present, and 22.0% were non-families. 20.3% of all households were made up of individuals, and 11.3% had someone living alone who was 65 years of age or older. The average household size was 2.45 and the average family size was 2.77.

In the village, the population was spread out, with 23.6% under the age of 18, 6.7% from 18 to 24, 26.1% from 25 to 44, 26.4% from 45 to 64, and 17.2% who were 65 years of age or older. The median age was 40 years. For every 100 females, there were 94.6 males. For every 100 females age 18 and over, there were 92.5 males.

The median income for a household in the village was $32,308, and the median income for a family was $36,591. Males had a median income of $37,321 versus $20,694 for females. The per capita income for the village was $15,948. About 3.0% of families and 8.1% of the population were below the poverty line, including 12.5% of those under age 18 and 8.6% of those age 65 or over.
