= Hopewell, Illinois =

- Village
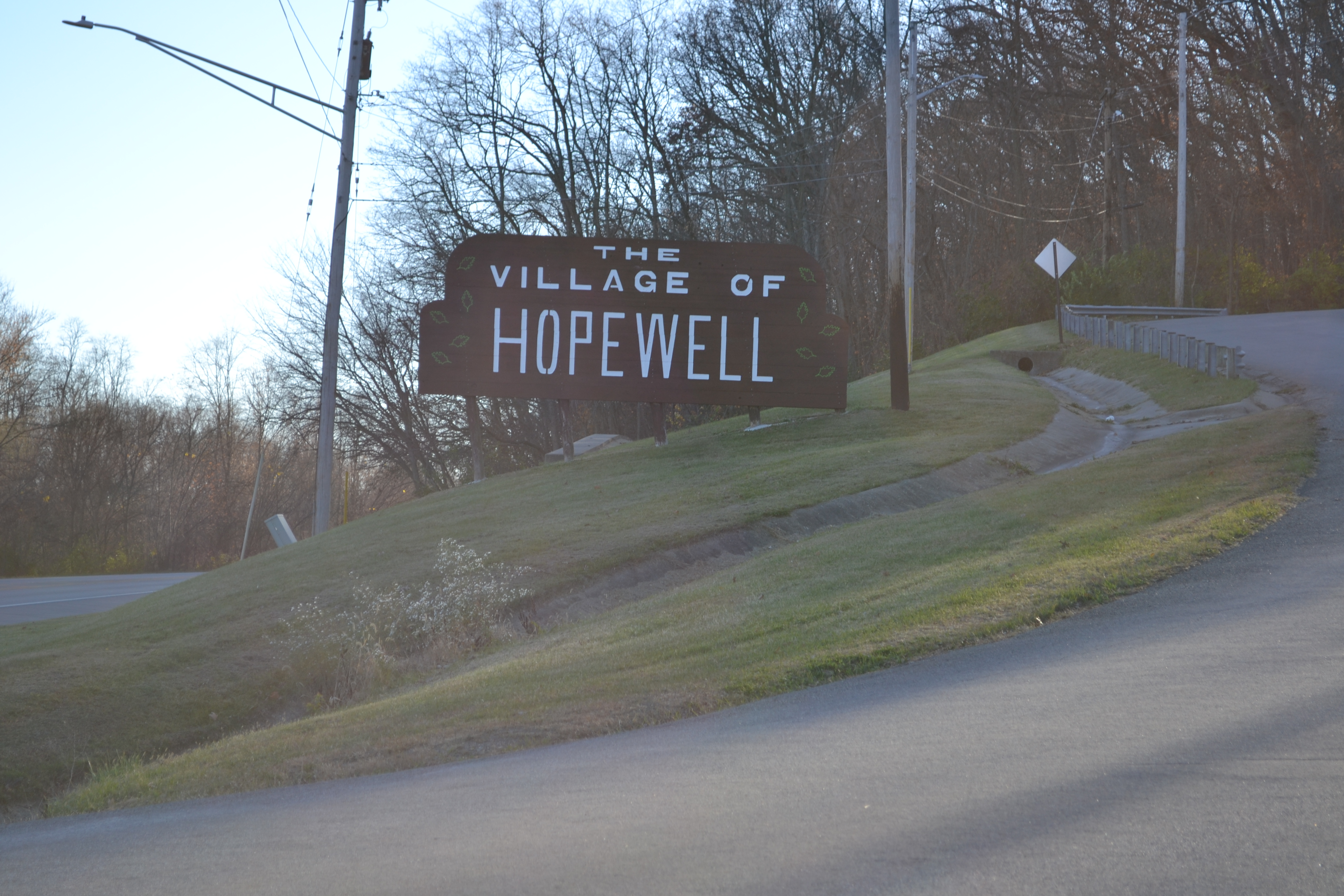
- Village sign

- Location in Marshall County, Illinois
- Coordinates: 40°59′03″N 89°27′26″W
- Country: United States
- State: Illinois
- County: Marshall
- Township: Steuben

Area
  - Total: 1.14 sq mi (2.94 km^{2})
  - Land: 1.14 sq mi (2.94 km^{2})
  - Water: 0 sq mi (0.00 km^{2})
- Elevation: 643 ft (196 m)

Population (2020)
  - Total: 421
  - Density: 370.8/sq mi (143.17/km^{2})
- Time zone: UTC-6 (CST)
  - Summer (DST): UTC-5 (CDT)
- ZIP code: 61565
- Area code: 309
- FIPS code: 17-36150
- GNIS feature ID: 2398542
- Website: villageofhopewell.com

Hopewell is a village in Marshall County, Illinois, United States. The population was 421 at the 2020 census. It is part of the Peoria Metropolitan Statistical Area. The village was incorporated in 1983.

== Geography ==
Hopewell is located in southwestern Marshall County. Illinois Route 29 leads north 3 miles (5 km) from Hopewell to Sparland and south 5 miles (8 km) to Chillicothe. The village sits on uplands overlooking the Illinois River valley to the east. IL 29, forming the eastern border of the village, runs along the bottom of the 150-foot-high (46 m) bluffs forming the western edge of the valley.

According to the U.S. Census Bureau, Hopewell has a total area of 1.14 square miles (2.95 km^{2}), all land.

=== Monuments ===
At the entrance to Hopewell at the top of the hill stands a giant sculpture of the head of a Native American. It belongs to a collection known as the Trail of the Whispering Giants, carved by Hungarian-born artist Peter Wolf Toth, who has created similar sculptures in all fifty U.S. states and some provinces in Canada.

== Demographics ==
Historical population
Census	Pop.	Note	%±
1990	343		—
2000	396		15.5%
2010	410		3.5%
2020	421		2.7%
U.S. Decennial Census

As of the census of 2000, there were 396 people, 140 households, and 123 families residing in the village. The population density was 352.0 inhabitants per square mile (135.9/km^{2}). There were 142 housing units at an average density of 126.2 per square mile (48.7/km^{2}). The racial makeup of the village was 93.74% White, 5.76% African American, 0.25% Asian, and 0.25% from two or more races. Hispanic or Latino of any race were 1.01% of the population.

There were 140 households, out of which 34.3% had children under the age of 18 living with them, 82.9% were married couples living together, 2.9% had a female householder with no husband present, and 12.1% were non-families. 9.3% of all households were made up of individuals, and none had someone living alone who was 65 years of age or older. The average household size was 2.83 and the average family size was 2.99.

In the village, the population was spread out, with 24.7% under the age of 18, 6.1% from 18 to 24, 26.8% from 25 to 44, 36.4% from 45 to 64, and 6.1% who were 65 years of age or older. The median age was 41 years. For every 100 females, there were 99.0 males. For every 100 females age 18 and over, there were 101.4 males.

The median income for a household in the village was $63,250, and the median income for a family was $71,250. Males had a median income of $48,250 versus $24,375 for females. The per capita income for the village was $25,143. None of the population or families were below the poverty line.
