= Saratoga Township, Illinois =

Saratoga Township, Illinois may refer to one of the following townships:

- Saratoga Township, Grundy County, Illinois
- Saratoga Township, Marshall County, Illinois

See also

- Saratoga Township (disambiguation)
