= La Prairie Center, Illinois =

- Unincorporated community
- Location within Illinois Location within the United States
- Coordinates: 41°01′01″N 89°35′26″W
- Country: United States
- State: Illinois
- County: Marshall
- Township: La Prairie
- Elevation: 768 ft (234 m)
- Time zone: UTC-6 (Central (CST))
  - Summer (DST): UTC-5 (CDT)
- Area code: 309
- GNIS feature ID: 411651

La Prairie Center is an unincorporated community in La Prairie Township, Marshall County, Illinois, United States. La Prairie Center is located at the junction of County Routes 9 and 13, 9.4 miles (15.1 km) west of Lacon.
