= IL-17 =

IL-17 or IL 17 may refer to:

- Interleukin 17, a pro-inflammatory cytokine
- Illinois's 17th congressional district
- Illinois Route 17
