= La Prairie Township =

La Prairie Township may refer to the following townships in the United States:

- La Prairie Township, Clearwater County, Minnesota
- La Prairie Township, Marshall County, Illinois
