= Saratoga =

Saratoga may refer to:

== Places ==
=== Australia ===
- Saratoga, New South Wales, coastal suburb of Central Coast Council

=== United States ===
==== New York ====
- Saratoga County, New York
  - Saratoga, New York, town
  - Saratoga Springs, New York, city (commonly referred to simply as "Saratoga")
    - Saratoga Performing Arts Center
    - Saratoga Race Course, thoroughbred horse racing track

==== Other ====
- Saratoga, California, city in Santa Clara County
- Saratoga, former name of Yeomet, California
- Saratoga, Indiana, town in Randolph County
- Saratoga, Minnesota
- Saratoga, Mississippi, unincorporated community
- Saratoga, Nebraska Territory, boom and bust town now inside of Omaha, Nebraska
- Saratoga, North Carolina, town in Wilson County
- Saratoga, Texas, unincorporated community in Hardin County
- Saratoga Springs, Utah, city in Utah County
- Saratoga, Clarke County, Virginia, small unincorporated community
- Saratoga (Boyce, Virginia), a home (the General Daniel Morgan House)
- Saratoga, Wisconsin, town
- Saratoga, Wyoming, town in Carbon County
- Saratoga Passage, Puget Sound, Washington
- Saratoga Township (disambiguation)

== Military ==
- Saratoga campaign (1777), during the American Revolutionary War
  - Battles of Saratoga, climax of the campaign
- USS Saratoga, any of several U.S. Navy ships named after the Battle of Saratoga

== Transportation ==
- Saratoga, Mount McGregor and Lake George Railroad
- Chrysler Saratoga, a model of automobile
- Piper Saratoga (Piper PA-32R), a single engine light aircraft by manufacturer Piper Aircraft

== Film and music ==
- Saratoga (play), 1870 play by Bronson Howard
- Saratoga (film), 1937 film set in the New York race track area, starring Clark Gable and Jean Harlow
- Saratoga (musical), a musical play from 1959
- "Saratoga", a former name of the 1970s American rock and roll band Kansas (band)
- Saratoga (band), Spanish heavy metal band
- Saratoga, CA - 9.18.06, Official Bootleg live album of singer-songwriter Ani DiFranco

== Other ==
- Either of two species of Australian fish in the family Osteoglossidae:
  - Southern saratoga (also spotted saratoga)
  - Gulf saratoga
- Saratoga (grape), another name for the Catawba grape
- Saratoga Protocol, developed by Surrey Satellite Technology Ltd to efficiently transfer remote-sensing imagery from the low-Earth-orbiting satellite Disaster Monitoring Constellation
- Saratoga Water, a bottled-water brand owned by BlueTriton Brands
