= Broadmoor (disambiguation) =

Broadmoor Hospital is a British high security psychiatric hospital.

Broadmoor may also refer to:

== Places ==
=== United Kingdom ===
- Broadmoor, Pembrokeshire, Wales
- Broad Moor, site of the Battle of Naseby, 1645

=== United States ===
- Broadmoor (Little Rock), Arkansas
- Broadmoor, California
- Broadmoor, Colorado
- Broadmoor, Illinois
- Broadmoor, Louisiana
- Broadmoor, New Orleans, Louisiana
- Broadmoor, Seattle, Washington

=== Canada ===
- Broadmoor, Richmond, British Columbia

== Sports ==
- Broadmoor Golf Club, Colorado Springs, U.S.
- Broadmoor Golf Club, Seattle, U.S.
- Broadmoor Skating Club, Colorado Springs, U.S.
- Broadmoor Trophy, a Western Collegiate Hockey Association award

== Other uses ==
- The Broadmoor, a hotel and resort in Colorado Springs, U.S.
- Broadmoor High School, in Baton Rouge, Louisiana, U.S.
- Broadmoor Records, a New Orleans-based record label
- North Burnet/Uptown station (formerly known as Broadmoor station), an under construction railway station in Austin, Texas, U.S.
