= Whitefield Township =

Whitefield Township may refer to the following townships in the United States:

- Whitefield Township, Marshall County, Illinois
- Whitefield Township, Kandiyohi County, Minnesota
