= Columbus Tustin =

American carriage maker & real estate developer (1827–1883)

- Born: 17 March 1827; Philadelphia, United States
- Died: 23 July 1883 (aged 56); Tustin, California, United States
- Known for: Founder of Tustin, California

Columbus Tustin (1827-1883) was an American carriage maker, best known as the founder of Tustin, California.

== Early life ==
Tustin was born in Philadelphia to Samuel Charles Tustin and Mary Frances Flanagan. When he was eleven he moved with his parents and 8 siblings to Marshall County, Illinois. 10 years later, they moved to Oregon where the family stayed for two years before moving south to Sacramento, then to Petaluma, California. He met his wife Mary in Sonoma County, California and moved to Southern California with their children.

== Career ==
He worked as a carriage maker, miner, farmer, postmaster, fruit grower, and as real estate developer. in the 1850s he developed one of Petaluma’s first large-scale nurseries. Tustin owned an orchard which contained over 75,000 grafted fruit trees, which won the prize for best nursery at the 1860 Sonoma County Agricultural and Mechanical Fair. In 1868 He and his partner, Nelson O. Stafford, purchased 1300 acres of the Rancho Santiago de Santa Ana when the Spanish land grant was being partitioned. Between 1868 and 1872, Tustin set about establishing a new settlement. He laid the streets out through the wild mustard and sycamore trees that covered the area. He moved his wife, Mary, and their five children there. He started selling lots and established the school district and the post office. When few people bought homesites, he offered lots free to anyone who would build a home. In 1877, Tustin competed unsuccessfully with William Spurgeon in Santa Ana for the southern terminus of the Southern-Pacific Railroad. He died in 1883.
