= Illinois Route 117 =

State highway in Illinois, US

Illinois Route 117
- IL 117 highlighted in red

Route information
- Maintained by IDOT
- Length: 33.85 mi (54.48 km)
- Existed: 1924–present

Major junctions
- South end: I-74 in Goodfield
- US 24 in Eureka
- North end: IL 17 in Toluca

Location
- Country: United States
- State: Illinois
- Counties: Woodford, Marshall

Highway system
- Illinois State Highway System; Interstate; US; State; Tollways; Scenic
← IL 116	→ IL 119

Illinois Route 117 is a rural north–south state route in north central Illinois. It travels from Interstate 74 in the small community of Goodfield to Illinois Route 17 in Toluca. Illinois 117 covers a distance of about 33.85 miles (54.48 km).

== Route description ==
Illinois 117 is a rural, two lane surface road for its entire length. The main cities of service on Illinois 117 are Eureka and Roanoke. In Eureka, Illinois 117 is known as Main Street, and intersects with U.S. Route 24 (Center Street).

Illinois 117 then overlaps Illinois Route 116 from four miles (6.4 km) west of Roanoke to Benson, a distance of about nine miles (14 km). Through Roanoke, Illinois 117 is called Front Street. Northeast of Roanoke, Illinois 116/117 runs on top of an abandoned rail line until it turns north towards Toluca.

== History ==
Illinois Route 116A
- Location: Benson–Toluca, Illinois
- Length: 13 mi (21 km)
- Existed: 1929–January 1993

Though Illinois 117 now connects to Illinois 17, they were originally unconnected, and each were separately planned in State Bond Issue sequence. SBI Route 117 originally ran from U.S. Route 150 (just north of current I-74) in Goodfield to Illinois 116 north of Eureka. On January 8, 1993, it was extended north through Roanoke and north to Toluca to renumber IL 116A, the last surviving letter route in Illinois.

== Major intersections ==
County	Location	mi	km	Destinations	Notes
Woodford	Goodfield	0.0	0.0	I-74 – Bloomington, Peoria	Southern terminus; I-74 exit 112
Woodford	Goodfield	0.4	0.64	US 150 (Peoria Street)	
Woodford	Eureka	7.0	11.3	US 24 (Center Street)	
Woodford		11.9	19.2	IL 116 west	South end of IL 116 concurrency
Woodford	Benson	21.2	34.1	IL 116 east	North end of IL 116 concurrency
Marshall	Toluca	33.85	54.48	IL 17	Northern terminus
1.000 mi = 1.609 km; 1.000 km = 0.621 mi: Concurrency terminus
