= La Rose, Illinois =

- Village
- Location in Marshall County, Illinois
- Coordinates: 40°58′43″N 89°14′06″W
- Country: United States
- State: Illinois
- County: Marshall
- Township: Bell Plain

Area
  - Total: 0.25 sq mi (0.66 km^{2})
  - Land: 0.25 sq mi (0.66 km^{2})
  - Water: 0 sq mi (0.00 km^{2})
- Elevation: 666 ft (203 m)

Population (2020)
  - Total: 98
  - Density: 384.5/sq mi (148.44/km^{2})
- Time zone: UTC-6 (CST)
  - Summer (DST): UTC-5 (CDT)
- ZIP code: 61541
- Area code: 309
- FIPS code: 17-42171
- GNIS feature ID: 2398369

La Rose is a village in Bell Plain Township, Marshall County, Illinois, United States. The population was 98 at the 2020 census, down from 144 in 2010. It is part of the Peoria Metropolitan Statistical Area.

== Geography ==
La Rose is located in southeastern Marshall County. Illinois Route 89 runs through the village as Main Street, leading north 4 miles (6 km) to Varna and southwest 5 miles (8 km) to Washburn.

According to the U.S. Census Bureau, La Rose has a total area of 0.25 square miles (0.65 km^{2}), all land. The North Branch of Crow Creek flows southwesterly past the southern border of the village, part of the Illinois River watershed.

== Demographics ==
Historical population
Census	Pop.	Note	%±
1880	125		—
1900	146		—
1910	155		6.2%
1920	171		10.3%
1930	150		−12.3%
1940	179		19.3%
1950	178		−0.6%
1960	192		7.9%
1970	165		−14.1%
1980	173		4.8%
1990	130		−24.9%
2000	159		22.3%
2010	144		−9.4%
2020	98		−31.9%
U.S. Decennial Census

As of the census of 2000, there were 159 people, 62 households, and 46 families residing in the village. The population density was 722.5 inhabitants per square mile (279.0/km^{2}). There were 63 housing units at an average density of 286.3 per square mile (110.5/km^{2}). The racial makeup of the village was 97.48% White, 0.63% Native American, 1.26% from other races, and 0.63% from two or more races. Hispanic or Latino of any race were 1.26% of the population.

There were 62 households, out of which 30.6% had children under the age of 18 living with them, 64.5% were married couples living together, 4.8% had a female householder with no husband present, and 24.2% were non-families. 21.0% of all households were made up of individuals, and 6.5% had someone living alone who was 65 years of age or older. The average household size was 2.56 and the average family size was 3.00.

In the village, the population was spread out, with 25.8% under the age of 18, 10.7% from 18 to 24, 29.6% from 25 to 44, 21.4% from 45 to 64, and 12.6% who were 65 years of age or older. The median age was 33 years. For every 100 females, there were 96.3 males. For every 100 females age 18 and over, there were 87.3 males.

The median income for a household in the village was $46,667, and the median income for a family was $50,000. Males had a median income of $27,500 versus $20,417 for females. The per capita income for the village was $17,480. About 5.2% of families and 10.1% of the population were below the poverty line, including 30.8% of those under the age of eighteen and none of those 65 or over.
