= Roanoke Township, Illinois =

Coordinates: 40°48′N 89°13′W

Roanoke Township
- Township
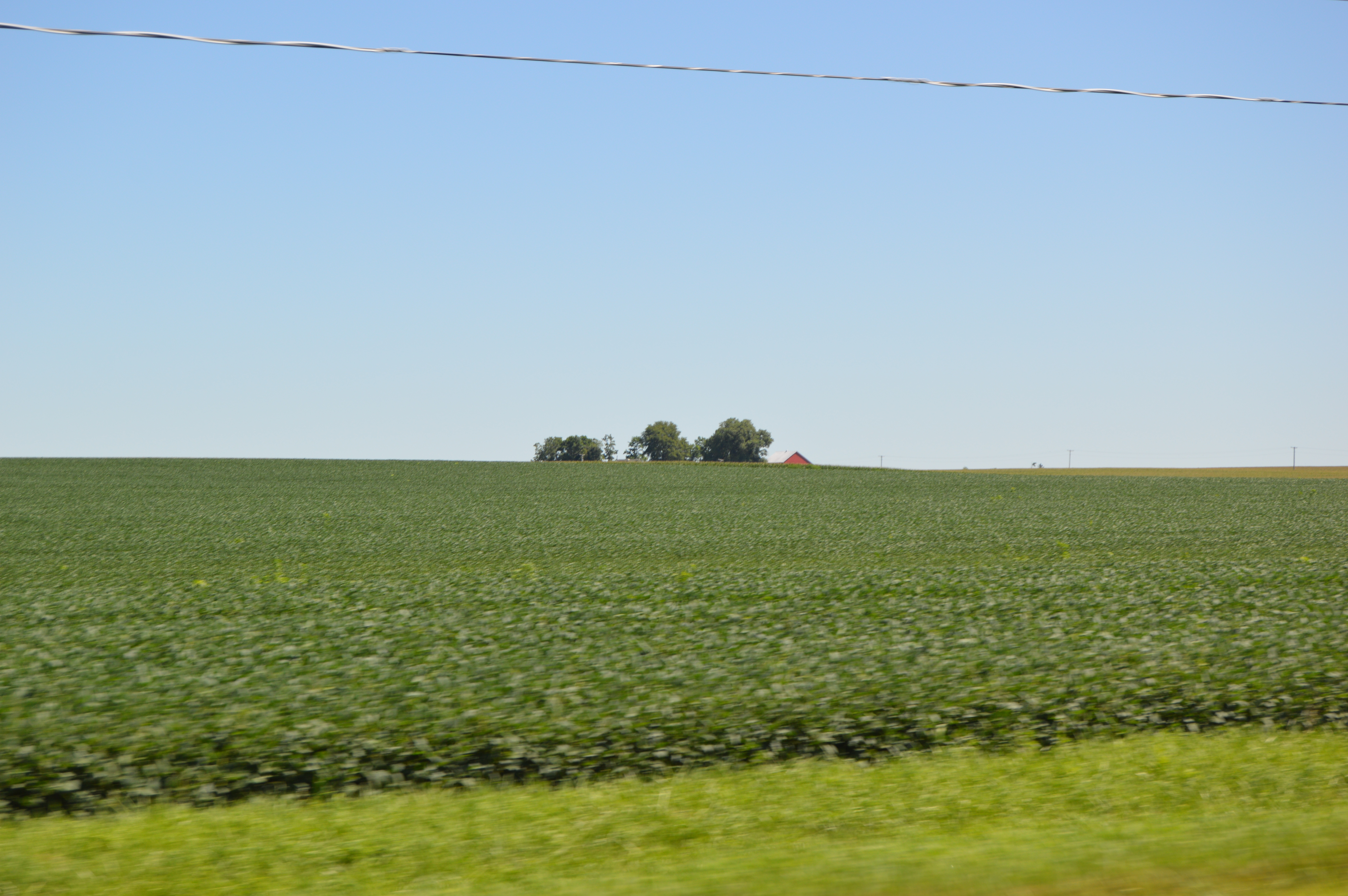
- Fields on Illinois Routes 116/117

- Location in Woodford County
- Country: United States
- State: Illinois
- County: Woodford
- Established: November 7, 1854

Area
  - Total: 36.86 sq mi (95.5 km^{2})
  - Land: 36.81 sq mi (95.3 km^{2})
  - Water: 0.05 sq mi (0.13 km^{2}) 0.14%

Population (2010)
  - Estimate (2016): 2,540
  - Density: 69.5/sq mi (26.8/km^{2})
- Time zone: UTC-6 (CST)
  - Summer (DST): UTC-5 (CDT)
- FIPS code: 17-203-64603

Roanoke Township is located in Woodford County, Illinois at T27N, R1W. As of the 2010 census, its population was 2,558 and it contained 1,044 housing units. Roanoke Township includes within its boundaries the village of Roanoke, Illinois.

== Geography ==
According to the 2010 census, the township has a total area of 36.86 square miles (95.5 km^{2}), of which 36.81 square miles (95.3 km^{2}) (or 99.86%) is land and 0.05 square miles (0.13 km^{2}) (or 0.14%) is water.

== Demographics ==
Historical population
Census	Pop.	Note	%±
2016 (est.)	2,540
U.S. Decennial Census
