= Broadmoor, Illinois =

- Unincorporated community
- Location within Illinois Location within the United States
- Coordinates: 41°08′44″N 89°37′43″W
- Country: United States
- State: Illinois
- County: Marshall
- Township: Saratoga
- Elevation: 774 ft (236 m)
- Time zone: UTC-6 (Central (CST))
  - Summer (DST): UTC-5 (CDT)
- Area code: 309
- GNIS feature ID: 422501

Broadmoor is an unincorporated community in Saratoga Township, Marshall County, Illinois, United States.

== Location ==
Broadmoor is located in the northwest corner of the county, 2.65 miles (4.26 km) southeast of Bradford.
