= La Fayette, Illinois =

La Fayette
- Village
- Location of La Fayette in Stark County, Illinois.
- Coordinates: 41°06′35″N 89°58′25″W
- Country: United States
- State: Illinois
- County: Stark

Area
  - Total: 0.19 sq mi (0.49 km^{2})
  - Land: 0.19 sq mi (0.49 km^{2})
  - Water: 0 sq mi (0.00 km^{2})
- Elevation: 794 ft (242 m)

Population (2020)
  - Total: 160
  - Density: 847.3/sq mi (327.15/km^{2})
- Time zone: UTC-6 (CST)
  - Summer (DST): UTC-5 (CDT)
- ZIP code: 61449
- Area code: 309
- FIPS code: 17-40676
- GNIS feature ID: 2398364

La Fayette (named after Gilbert du Motier, Marquis de Lafayette, pronounced locally "Lay - fay - et") is a village in Stark County, Illinois, United States. It is located south of Kewanee along IL 17 (Madison Street). As of the 2020 census, La Fayette had a population of 160. It is part of the Peoria, Illinois Metropolitan Statistical Area.

== History ==
Once a prominent strip coal mine and farming village with a general store, high school(until 1970), hotel, bank, grain elevator, train depot, and many other features and amenities. Once the coal mines shut down and the railroad was removed in the early 1980s, it slowly became a low-income and high-poverty village with many people moving away, and it eventually diminished to the hollow shell of what it once was.

== Geography ==
According to the 2010 census, La Fayette has a total area of 0.19 square miles (0.49 km^{2}), all land.

== Demographics ==
Historical population
Census	Pop.	Note	%±
1870	284		—
1880	265		−6.7%
1890	250		−5.7%
1900	283		13.2%
1910	287		1.4%
1920	258		−10.1%
1930	253		−1.9%
1940	295		16.6%
1950	301		2.0%
1960	269		−10.6%
1970	268		−0.4%
1980	281		4.9%
1990	231		−17.8%
2000	227		−1.7%
2010	223		−1.8%
2020	160		−28.3%
U.S. Decennial Census

As of the census of 2000, there were 227 people, 91 households, and 63 families residing in the village. The population density was 1,235.2 inhabitants per square mile (476.9/km^{2}). There were 93 housing units at an average density of 506.0 per square mile (195.4/km^{2}). The racial makeup of the village was 96.48% White, 0.44% Asian, 1.76% from other races, and 1.32% from two or more races. Hispanic or Latino of any race were 1.76% of the population.

There were 91 households, out of which 30.8% had children under the age of 18 living with them, 59.3% were married couples living together, 6.6% had a female householder with no husband present, and 29.7% were non-families. 24.2% of all households were made up of individuals, and 15.4% had someone living alone who was 65 years of age or older. The average household size was 2.49 and the average family size was 2.98.

In the village, the population was spread out, with 27.3% under the age of 18, 5.3% from 18 to 24, 22.9% from 25 to 44, 23.3% from 45 to 64, and 21.1% who were 65 years of age or older. The median age was 40 years. For every 100 females, there were 83.1 males. For every 100 females age 18 and over, there were 83.3 males.

The median income for a household in the village was $26,563, and the median income for a family was $28,125. Males had a median income of $28,125 versus $20,893 for females. The per capita income for the village was $15,002. About 9.0% of families and 13.2% of the population were below the poverty line, including 28.3% of those under the age of eighteen and 13.0% of those 65 or over.

== Education ==
It is within the Stark County Community Unit School District 100. The district's comprehensive high school is Stark County High School in Toulon.
