= Illinois Route 17 =

East-west state highway in Illinois, US

Illinois Route 17
- IL 17 highlighted in red

Route information
- Maintained by IDOT
- Length: 209.40 mi (337.00 km)
- Existed: November 5, 1918–present

Major junctions
- West end: 1st Street in New Boston
- US 67 in Viola; US 150 in Alpha I-74 / IL 110 (CKC) in Woodhull; US 34 in Bishop Hill; US 34 in Galva; I-39 / US 51 in Wenona; I-55 in Dwight; US 45 / US 52 in Kankakee; I-57 in Kankakee
- East end: SR 2 in Grant Park

Location
- Country: United States
- State: Illinois
- Counties: Mercer, Henry, Knox, Stark, Marshall, LaSalle, Livingston, Grundy, Kankakee

Highway system
- Illinois State Highway System; Interstate; US; State; Tollways; Scenic
← IL 16	→ IL 18

Illinois Route 17 (IL 17) is a rural, arterial east–west state highway that runs east from a former ferry crossing in New Boston along the banks of the Mississippi River to State Road 2 west of Lowell, Indiana. It is 209.40 miles (337.00 km) long.

== Route description ==
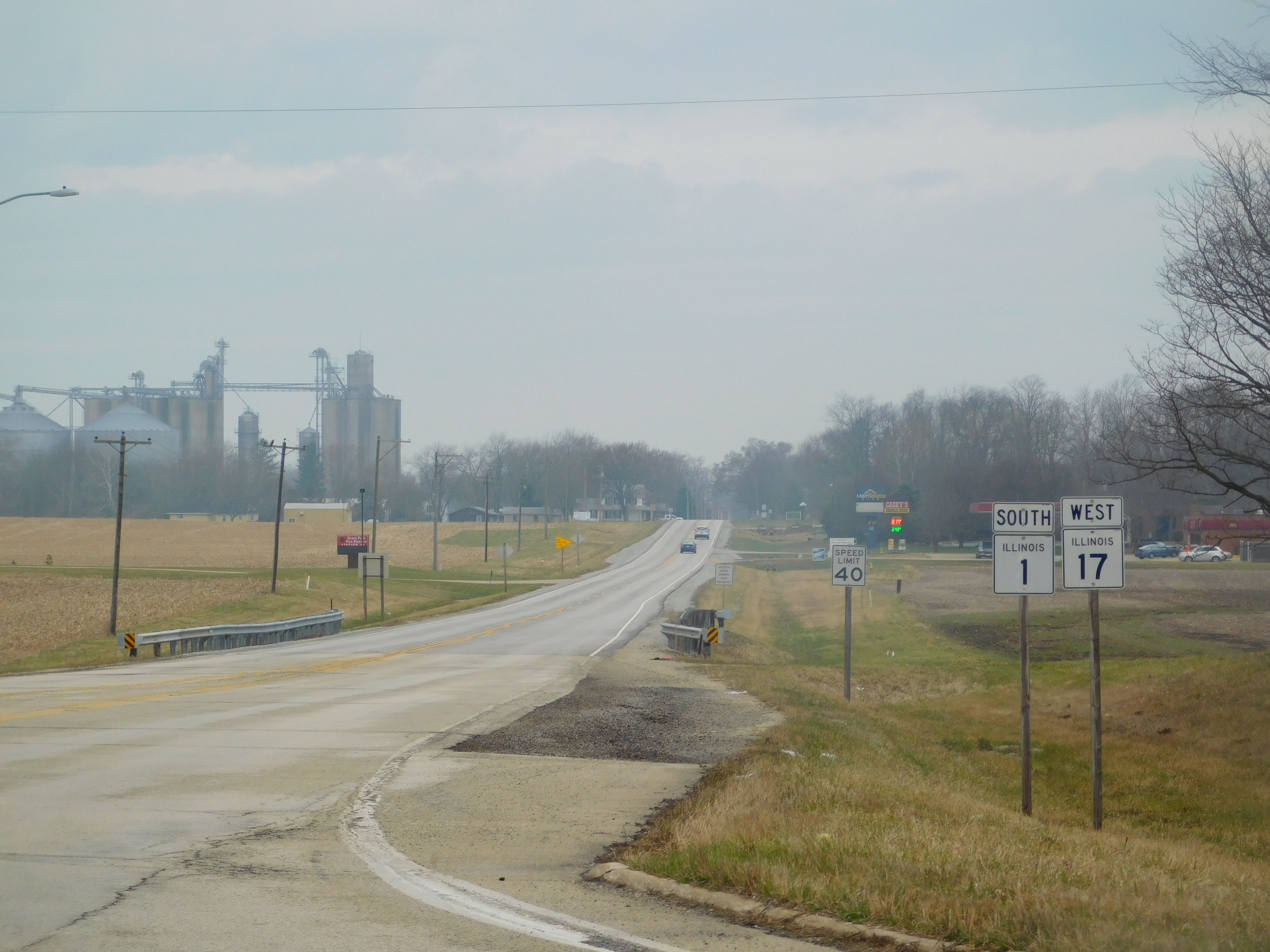
IL 1 and IL 17 at their concurrency in Grant Park

Illinois 17 is the main street for numerous small towns in west central and central Illinois. It crosses the Illinois River at Lacon, and passes through Dwight and Kankakee, before it joins with Illinois Route 1 and enters Indiana east of Grant Park.

Illinois 17 also overlaps with U.S. Route 34, Illinois Route 251 (old U.S. Route 51), and Illinois Route 40 south of Wyoming. It also crosses the Kankakee River at Kankakee, IL. The route is largely a 2 lane road except through towns, where it occasionally becomes a 2 lane road with a center turn lane. East of Kankakee, Illinois 17 becomes a 4-lane divided highway.

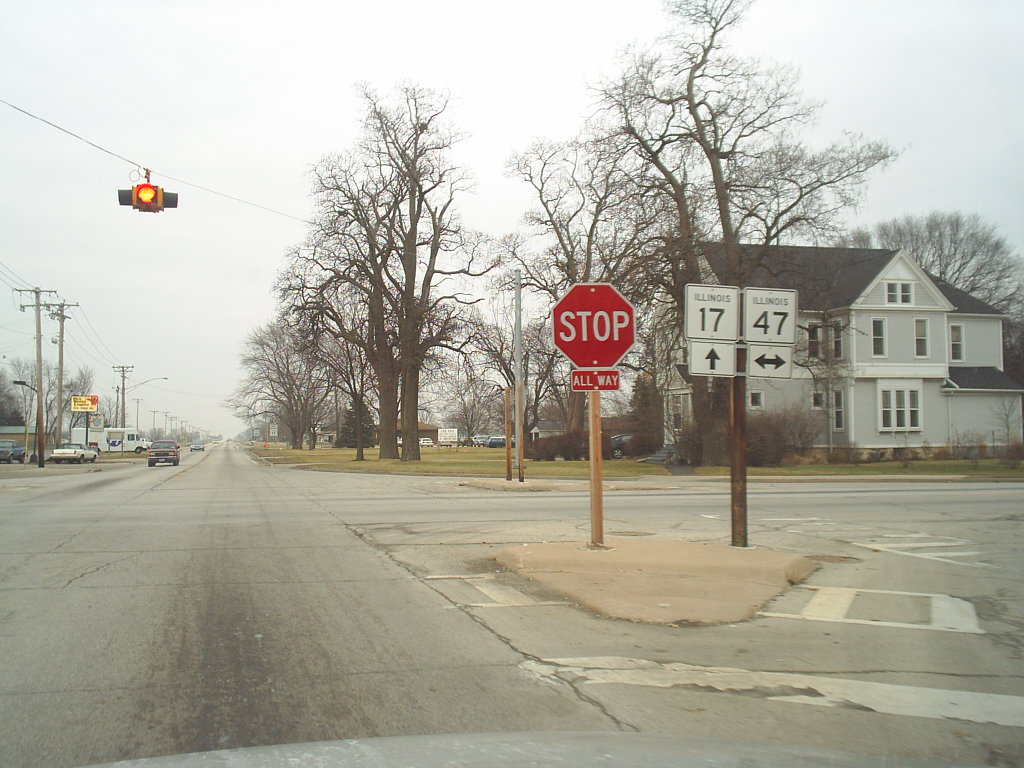
IL 17 at junction with IL 47 in Dwight

At its western terminus, Illinois 17 is one of the only routes in the state not to connect to a state highway or U.S. Route of another state. A ferry crossing to Iowa had been dropped in the 1950s, but the terminus has not been moved east to reflect this. In 2003, the discovery that the Mississippi River had deepened at a nearby location raised the possibility of returning ferry service to New Boston. Ferry service in New Boston would be expected to bring 15,000 cars across the river yearly, saving the vehicles from driving to either Burlington, Iowa or Muscatine, Iowa — distances of about 50 miles (80 km) — to cross over into Iowa.

== History ==
SBI Route 17 originally ran from Lacon to Grant Park. The only changes to Route 17 have been extensions east and west, and a relocation to a new road south of Streator.

Illinois Route 83A connected Illinois Route 83 (now Illinois Route 17) to Keithsburg.

== Major intersections ==
County	Location	mi	km	Destinations	Notes
Mercer	New Boston	0.0	0.0	1st Street (Mississippi River)	Western terminus
Mercer		1.5	2.4	Great River Road north	West end of GRR overlap
Mercer	Joy	4.0	6.4	Great River Road south	East end of GRR overlap
Mercer	Aledo	14.5	23.3	IL 94 south (College Avenue)	West end of IL 94 overlap
Mercer	Aledo	15.4	24.8	IL 94 north (Northeast 15th Avenue)	East end of IL 94 overlap
Mercer	Viola	23.1	37.2	US 67 (13th Street)	
Henry		33.9	54.6	US 150 north	West end of US 150 overlap
Henry	Alpha	35.4	57.0	US 150 south	East end of US 150 overlap
Henry	Woodhull	37.9	61.0	I-74 / IL 110 (CKC) – Moline, Galesburg	I-74 exit 32
Henry	Nekoma	46.3	74.5	IL 82 north	
Henry	Bishop Hill	47.8	76.9	US 34 west	West end of US 34 overlap
Henry	Galva	53.9	86.7	US 34 (2nd Street)	East end of US 34 overlap
Knox		57.9	93.2	IL 180 south	
Stark		64.0	103.0	IL 78 north	West end of IL 78 overlap
Stark	LaFayette	64.5	103.8	IL 78 south	East end of IL 78 overlap
Stark	Toulon	68.0	109.4	IL 91 north (Union Street)	West end of IL 91 overlap
Stark	Wyoming	74.0	119.1	IL 91 south (7th Street)	East end of IL 91 overlap
Stark		80.6	129.7	IL 40 north	West end of IL 40 overlap
Marshall	Speer	85.1	137.0	IL 40 south	East end of IL 40 overlap
Marshall	Sparland	95.3	153.4	IL 29 north (Railroad Street)	West end of IL 29 overlap
Marshall	Sparland	95.6	153.9	IL 29 south (Railroad Street)	East end of IL 29 overlap
Marshall	Illinois River	96.7	155.6	Lacon Bridge	
Marshall	Lacon	97.2	156.4	IL 26 (Prairie Street)	
Marshall	Varna	106.5	171.4	IL 89 (2160 East Road)	
Marshall	Toluca	111.5	179.4	IL 117 south (2650 East Road)	
Marshall	Oglesby	115.6	186.0	I-39 / US 51 – Bloomington-Normal, Rockford	I-39 exit 35
LaSalle	Streator	116.0	186.7	IL 251 south (East 6th Road)	West end of IL 251 overlap
LaSalle	Wenona	118.1	190.1	IL 251 north (Chestnut Street)	East end of IL 251 overlap
Livingston	Ancona	129.4	208.2	IL 23 (North 500 East Road)	
Livingston		138.2	222.4	IL 18 west (North 1200 East Road)	
Livingston	Blackstone	141.2	227.2	IL 170 (North 1500 East Road)	
Livingston		151.2	243.3	I-55 (Barack Obama Presidential Expressway) – Bloomington, Joliet	I-55 exit 217
Livingston	Dwight	151.8	244.3	Historic US 66 – Joliet, Bloomington	
Livingston	Dwight	152.8	245.9	IL 47 (Union Street)	
Grundy	No major junctions				
Kankakee	Kankakee	181.9	292.7	IL 113 west (Wall Street)	
Kankakee	Kankakee	182.1	293.1	Bridge over Kankakee River	
Kankakee	Kankakee	182.2	293.2	US 45 north / US 52 north (Kennedy Drive)	West end of US 45/US 52 overlap
Kankakee	Kankakee	182.7	294.0	US 45 south / US 52 south (Washington Avenue)	East end of US 45/US 52 overlap
Kankakee	Kankakee	183.0	294.5	IL 50 south (Indiana Avenue)	
Kankakee	Kankakee	183.1	294.7	IL 50 north (Harrison Avenue)	
Kankakee	Kankakee	184.3	296.6	I-57 (Eastern Kankakee Bypass) – Chicago, Champaign	I-57 exit 312
Kankakee	Sun River Terrace	190.2	306.1	IL 1 south (South 7500 East Road)	West end of IL 1 overlap
Kankakee	Momence	195.5	314.6	IL 114 east (Gladiolus Street)	
Kankakee	Grant Park	203.0	326.7	IL 1 north (County Road East 1241 North)	East end of IL 1 overlap
Lake	Belshaw	209.4	337.0	SR 2 east	Continuation into Indiana
1.000 mi = 1.609 km; 1.000 km = 0.621 mi: Concurrency terminus
