= Henry, Illinois =

- City
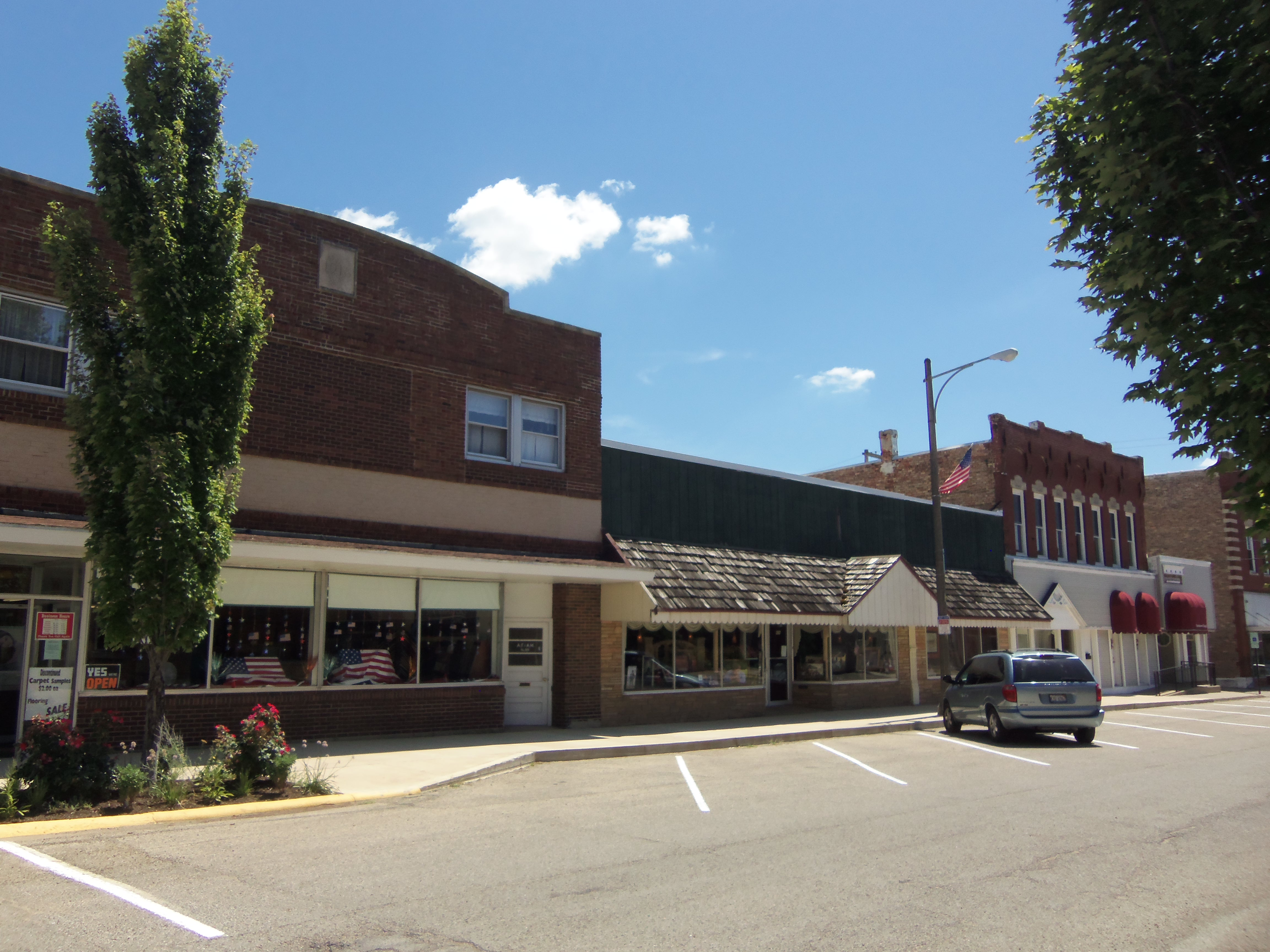
- Downtown Henry

- Location in Marshall County, Illinois
- Coordinates: 41°06′47″N 89°21′20″W
- Country: United States
- State: Illinois
- County: Marshall
- Township: Henry
- Founded: 1836
- Named after: James D. Henry

Government
  - Mayor: Jeff Bergfeld

Area
  - Total: 1.87 sq mi (4.84 km^{2})
  - Land: 1.80 sq mi (4.65 km^{2})
  - Water: 0.073 sq mi (0.19 km^{2})
- Elevation: 492 ft (150 m)

Population (2020)
  - Total: 2,320
  - Estimate (2024): 2,298
  - Density: 1,291.0/sq mi (498.44/km^{2})
- Time zone: UTC-6 (CST)
  - Summer (DST): UTC-5 (CDT)
- ZIP code: 61537
- Area code: 309
- FIPS code: 17-34163
- GNIS feature ID: 2394355
- Website: www.cityofhenryil.org

Henry is a city in Marshall County, Illinois, United States. The population was 2,320 at the 2020 census. It is part of the Peoria Metropolitan Statistical Area.

== History ==
Henry is named after General James D. Henry and was initially surveyed in 1834. The topography of the land on the west side of the Illinois River, with relatively steep banks rising well above river level, assured early settlers that their homes would not flood.

Its slogan, "Best Town in Illinois by a Dam Site", is derived from the city's distinction of having the first lock and dam built on the Illinois River. It was completed in 1870 at a cost of $400,000.

The retreat house of the Roman Catholic Diocese of Peoria (Nazareth Retreat House, formerly King's House) is located here.

== Geography ==
Henry is located in northern Marshall County and is bordered to the east by the Illinois River, which forms the boundary with Putnam County. Illinois Route 18 passes through the center of Henry as Third Street and School Street, leading southwest across the Illinois River on the Henry Bridge, then east 28 miles (45 km) to Streator. Illinois Route 29 passes through the west side of the city, leading north and east 24 miles (39 km) to Spring Valley and southwest 33 miles (53 km) to Peoria.

According to the U.S. Census Bureau, Henry has a total area of 1.87 square miles (4.84 km^{2}), of which 1.80 square miles (4.66 km^{2}) are land and 0.07 square miles (0.18 km^{2}), or 3.85%, are water, consisting of the Illinois River and its inlets.

=== Geomorphology and geology ===
Henry lies on a segment of a river terrace that is about 9 miles (14.5 km) long and just over 4 miles (6.5 km) wide. This fluvial terrace is underlain by stratified; yellowish brown to grayish brown; calcareous; and usually clean and moderately well sorted sand and gravel with cobbles and boulders. These sands and gravels contain occasional beds of silt and clay and unconformably overlie older sand and gravel deposits, glacial till, or bedrock. The sands and gravels underlying the terrace on which Henry lies were deposited by the Kankakee Torrent about 19,000 BP calibrated years ago.

Within the Illinois River valley, these sediments typically range from 10 to 80 feet (3 to 24 m) thick. These and other Wisconsinan coarse-grained, fluvial sands and gravel within Illinois have been named after the city of Henry and are currently known as the Henry Formation, a geological formation. The parts of the Henry Formation which are of fluvial or glaciofluvial origin are designated as the Mackinaw facies of the Henry Formation. The original exposure from which the Henry Formation was named was a former sand and gravel pit that was located along Illinois Highway 29, 2 miles (3.2 km) north of Henry.

== Demographics ==
Historical population
| Census | Pop. | Note | %± |
|---|---|---|---|
| 1850 | 400 | | — |
| 1870 | 2,162 | | — |
| 1880 | 1,728 | | −20.1% |
| 1890 | 1,512 | | −12.5% |
| 1900 | 1,637 | | 8.3% |
| 1910 | 1,687 | | 3.1% |
| 1920 | 1,637 | | −3.0% |
| 1930 | 1,658 | | 1.3% |
| 1940 | 1,877 | | 13.2% |
| 1950 | 1,966 | | 4.7% |
| 1960 | 2,278 | | 15.9% |
| 1970 | 2,610 | | 14.6% |
| 1980 | 2,740 | | 5.0% |
| 1990 | 2,591 | | −5.4% |
| 2000 | 2,540 | | −2.0% |
| 2010 | 2,464 | | −3.0% |
| 2020 | 2,320 | | −5.8% |
U.S. Decennial Census

=== 2020 census ===
As of the 2020 census, Henry had a population of 2,320. The median age was 44.2 years. 21.3% of residents were under the age of 18 and 24.0% of residents were 65 years of age or older. For every 100 females there were 90.6 males, and for every 100 females age 18 and over there were 88.8 males age 18 and over.

0.0% of residents lived in urban areas, while 100.0% lived in rural areas.

There were 989 households in Henry, of which 27.3% had children under the age of 18 living in them. Of all households, 45.3% were married-couple households, 17.7% were households with a male householder and no spouse or partner present, and 29.1% were households with a female householder and no spouse or partner present. About 33.4% of all households were made up of individuals and 19.7% had someone living alone who was 65 years of age or older.

There were 1,087 housing units, of which 9.0% were vacant. The homeowner vacancy rate was 5.5% and the rental vacancy rate was 3.3%.

Racial composition as of the 2020 census
| Race | Number | Percent |
|---|---|---|
| White | 2,193 | 94.5% |
| Black or African American | 5 | 0.2% |
| American Indian and Alaska Native | 3 | 0.1% |
| Asian | 12 | 0.5% |
| Native Hawaiian and Other Pacific Islander | 0 | 0.0% |
| Some other race | 18 | 0.8% |
| Two or more races | 89 | 3.8% |
| Hispanic or Latino (of any race) | 32 | 1.4% |

=== 2000 census ===
As of the census of 2000, there were 2,540 people, 1,014 households, and 678 families residing in the city. The population density was 1,821.3 inhabitants per square mile (703.2/km^{2}). There were 1,085 housing units at an average density of 778.0 per square mile (300.4/km^{2}). The racial makeup of the city was 97.68% White, 0.51% African American, 0.20% Native American, 0.20% Asian, 0.12% from other races, and 1.30% from two or more races. Hispanic or Latino of any race were 0.63% of the population.

There were 1,014 households, out of which 29.6% had children under the age of 18 living with them, 55.2% were married couples living together, 8.2% had a female householder with no husband present, and 33.1% were non-families. 29.8% of all households were made up of individuals, and 16.9% had someone living alone who was 65 years of age or older. The average household size was 2.42 and the average family size was 3.00.

In the city the population was spread out, with 23.9% under the age of 18, 6.9% from 18 to 24, 24.1% from 25 to 44, 23.0% from 45 to 64, and 22.1% who were 65 years of age or older. The median age was 42 years. For every 100 females, there were 88.1 males. For every 100 females age 18 and over, there were 87.1 males.

The median income for a household in the city was $40,236, and the median income for a family was $50,375. Males had a median income of $39,919 versus $18,621 for females. The per capita income for the city was $18,473. About 5.7% of families and 5.6% of the population were below the poverty line, including 5.5% of those under age 18 and 6.3% of those age 65 or over.

== Education ==
Henry has its own school district, Henry-Senachwine Consolidated Unit School District #5 (CUSD #5), that includes two schools.

- Henry-Senachwine Grade/Junior High School (grades kindergarten-8th)
- Henry-Senachwine High School, also referred to as HSHS (grades 9th-12th)

=== School mascots and colors ===
The two schools that make up CUSD #5 each have their own mascots: cardinals for the grade/junior high school and mallards for the high school. Both schools use red as the primary school color.

== Notable people ==
- John P. Cromwell, World War II submarine commander who received Medal of Honor posthumously; born in Henry
- Richard Widmark, actor; lived in Henry as a child
