= Bennington Township, Marshall County, Illinois =

Coordinates: 40°58′12″N 89°06′23″W

Bennington Township
- Township
- Location in Marshall County

- Marshall County's location in Illinois
- Country: United States
- State: Illinois
- County: Marshall
- Established: Before 1860

Area
  - Total: 36.01 sq mi (93.3 km^{2})
  - Land: 36.01 sq mi (93.3 km^{2})
  - Water: 0 sq mi (0 km^{2}) 0%

Population (2010)
  - Estimate (2016): 1,564
- Time zone: UTC-6 (CST)
  - Summer (DST): UTC-5 (CDT)
- FIPS code: 17-123-05235

Bennington Township is located in Marshall County, Illinois, United States. As of the 2010 census, its population was 1,669 and it contained 750 housing units. Bennington Township formed from a portion of Bell Plain Township. The exact date is unknown, but it was prior to 1860.

== Geography ==
According to the 2010 census, the township has a total area of 36.01 square miles (93.3 km^{2}), all land.

== Demographics ==
Historical population
Census	Pop.	Note	%±
2016 (est.)	1,564
U.S. Decennial Census
