= Camp Grove, Illinois =

- Unincorporated community
- Location within Illinois Location within the United States
- Coordinates: 41°04′44″N 89°37′59″W
- Country: United States
- State: Illinois
- County: Marshall
- Elevation: 843 ft (257 m)
- Time zone: UTC-6 (Central (CST))
  - Summer (DST): UTC-5 (CDT)
- ZIP code: 61424
- Area code: 309
- GNIS feature ID: 405471

Camp Grove is an unincorporated community in Marshall County, Illinois, United States, located 7.5 miles (12.1 km) east-northeast of Wyoming and 27.6 miles (44.4 km) north of Peoria. Camp Grove has a post office with ZIP code 61424.

The Camp Grove Wind Farm is located adjacent to the community.

== History ==
Camp Grove was platted in 1901. It was named from a camp in a grove near the town site.
