= Bell Plain Township, Marshall County, Illinois =

Coordinates: 40°59′N 89°13′W

Bell Plain Township
- Township
- Location in Marshall County

- Marshall County's location in Illinois
- Country: United States
- State: Illinois
- County: Marshall
- Established: November 6, 1849

Area
  - Total: 36.9 sq mi (96 km^{2})
  - Land: 36.81 sq mi (95.3 km^{2})
  - Water: 0.09 sq mi (0.23 km^{2}) 0.24%

Population (2010)
  - Estimate (2016): 380
  - Density: 10.9/sq mi (4.2/km^{2})
- Time zone: UTC-6 (CST)
  - Summer (DST): UTC-5 (CDT)
- FIPS code: 17-123-04949

Bell Plain Township, Township 29 North, Range 1 West, is located in Marshall County, Illinois. It includes the villages of Pattonsburg and La Rose and is traversed by State Highway 29 and the BNSF Railway.

As of the 2010 census, its population was 400 and it contained 169 housing units.

== Geography ==
According to the 2010 census, the township has a total area of 36.9 square miles (96 km^{2}), of which 36.81 square miles (95.3 km^{2}) (or 99.76%) is land and 0.09 square miles (0.23 km^{2}) (or 0.24%) is water.

== Demographics ==
Historical population
Census	Pop.	Note	%±
2016 (est.)	380
U.S. Decennial Census
