= Wenona, Illinois =

- City
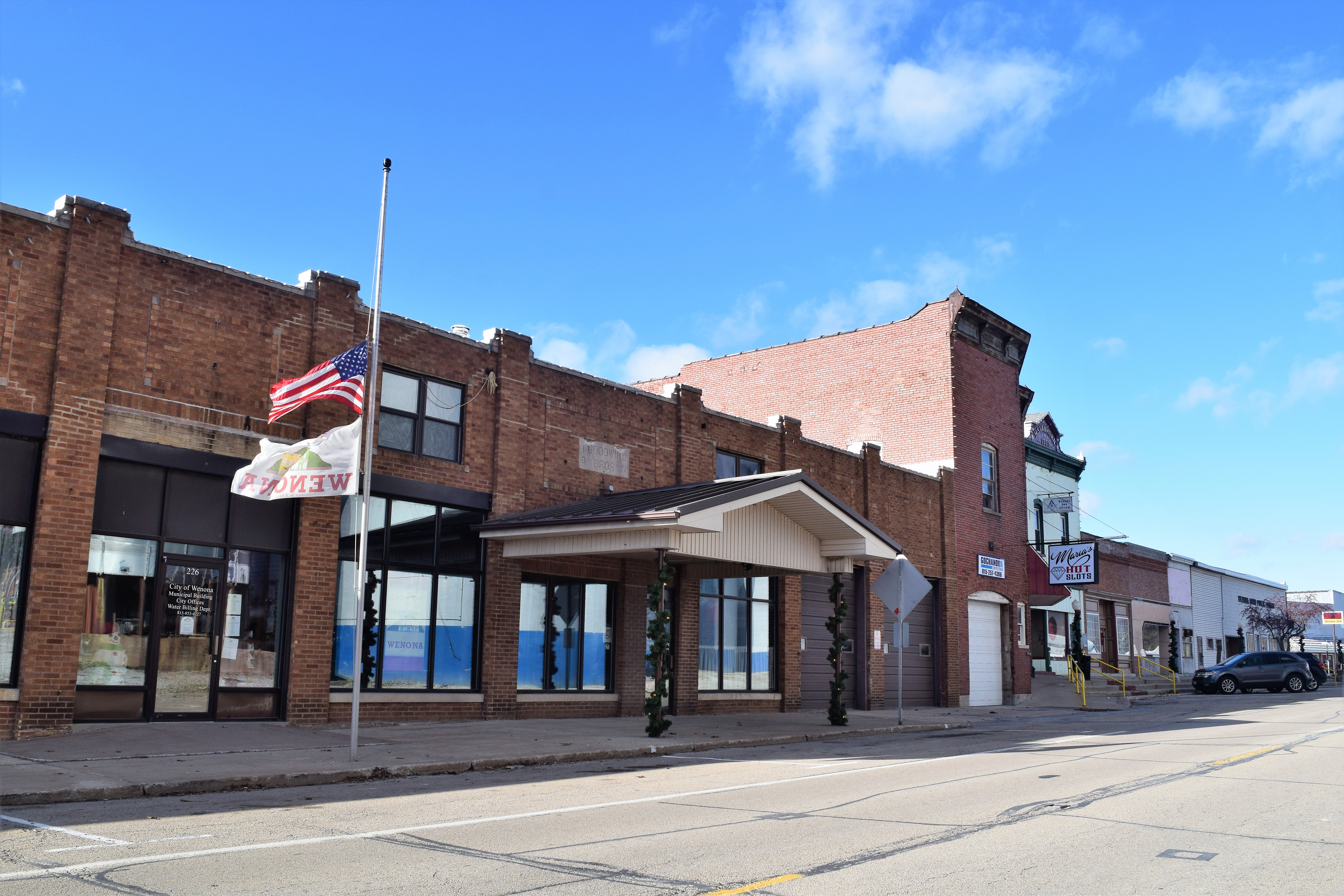
- Downtown Wenona, including its municipal building

- Location in Marshall County, Illinois
- Coordinates: 41°02′55″N 89°03′08″W
- Country: United States
- State: Illinois
- Counties: Marshall, LaSalle
- Townships: Evans, Osage

Area
  - Total: 0.736 sq mi (1.906 km^{2})
  - Land: 0.736 sq mi (1.906 km^{2})
  - Water: 0 sq mi (0.00 km^{2})
- Elevation: 689 ft (210 m)

Population (2020)
  - Total: 974
  - Density: 1,324/sq mi (511.1/km^{2})
- Time zone: UTC-6 (CST)
  - Summer (DST): UTC-5 (CDT)
- ZIP code: 61377
- Area code: 815
- FIPS code: 17-79813
- GNIS feature ID: 2397256
- Website: www.cityofwenona.org

Wenona is a city in Marshall and LaSalle counties in the U.S. state of Illinois. The population was 974 at the 2020 census.

The Marshall County portion of Wenona is part of the Peoria Metropolitan Statistical Area, while the small portion that lies in LaSalle County is part of the Ottawa Micropolitan Statistical Area.

== History ==
Around 1852, the first buildings had been erected within the town, including living quarters for the rail-men, the freight depot, and passenger station. This same year, the house for Gr. W. Goodwell, Wenona's station agent and first postmaster, was completed. Along with the post office, in June 1854, the Presbyterian Church was set up. During the winter months of 1854, W.M Brown arrived in Wenona with a large stock of goods; a building was constructed to accommodate his sales. Wenona was laid off by the Illinois Central Railroad Company on May 15, 1855. At the time, the town had around nine buildings and fifty permanent citizens. By 1858 it had grown rapidly, and was now a thrifty village of several hundred inhabitants, with two hotels, a number of stores, and other branches of business in proportion.

A great amount of grain was annually shipped at this point, and a considerable amount of trade was carried on with the surrounding country. The largest single industry contributing to the growth and prosperity of Wenona was its coal mine, located in the northeast quarter of the town, east of the Illinois Central tracks. The mine was opened under the Hamilton-Hodge-Monser partnership and was incorporated November 9, 1882, as the Wenona Coal Company. The partnership was soon dissolved, and ownership passed on to E. L. Monser, with George S. Monser production manager and W. E. Monser sales manager. The vein of coal varied from 3 feet 6 inches (1.07 m) to 4 feet (1.22 m). Peak employment numbered 550 miners and the average payroll approximated $30,000 per month, paid to employees in gold coin for a number of years, later cash at the mine and finally by checks at the bank. The mine operated from 1882 to 1924, at which time it was closed never to reopen. A new union scale was said to have made it unprofitable for the company to continue mining such a thin vein.

It was during the operation of the mine and World War I that the population of Wenona reached an all-time high of 1892 inhabitants. It was said by old timers that on the day after pay-day at the mines, the Chicago & Alton depot was so crowded with people that the railroad could not accommodate its out-of-town passengers.

At the height of the Cold War, the highest spot in town played a role in US defense. Beginning in April 1958, atop the slag pile from the old Wenona coal mine, a radar station was developed which was equipped to detect incoming missiles and enemy airplanes potentially headed to Chicago or Milwaukee. The radar station was staffed by approximately 20 troops from the 45th AAA Brigade and the 105th Signal Corps Detachment. It could detect aircraft as far up as 75,000 feet (23,000 m) in any direction, and as far away as 200 nautical miles (370 km; 230 mi). The Wenona station was one of ten stations set up in Illinois, Michigan, and Wisconsin within 200 miles (320 km) of Chicago in the Chicago Air Defense System. The radar station included two metal buildings and the radar antenna. The base of the slag pile was surrounded by a six-strand barbed-wire fence. Prior to constructing the buildings on top of the slag pile, 30 feet (9 m) were graded off the top and a circular roadway was built around the slag pile from bottom to top. At least three men who served at the Wenona Radar Station settled in Wenona after completion. The Army left Wenona in 1959, but before leaving town, planted the seeds on the mound which gave way to the beautiful forestry seen today.

The Wenona Coal Mine Historical Site was dedicated by members of the Wenona Historical Society on August 10, 2018, during the Wenona Days celebration.

== Geography ==
Most of the city lies in Marshall County, although two small areas of about a block each extend east into southern LaSalle County. In the 2000 census, all of Wenona's 1,065 residents lived in Marshall County. As of 2022, Wenona has a total area of 0.74 square miles (1.92 km^{2}), all land.

Illinois Route 17 passes through Wenona as Chestnut Street. The highway leads east 35 miles (56 km) to Dwight and west 20 miles (32 km) to Lacon, the Marshall county seat. Illinois Route 251 joins Route 17 on Chestnut Street through the center of Wenona but leads north 7 miles (11 km) to Lostant and south 5 miles (8 km) to Rutland. Interstate 39 passes just west of Wenona, with access from Exit 35 south of the city; I-39 leads north 24 miles (39 km) to La Salle and south 40 miles (64 km) to Normal.

Wenona is drained to the north by tributaries of Sandy Creek, which flows west to the Illinois River at Henry.

== Demographics ==
Historical population
Census	Pop.	Note	%±
1870	879		—
1880	911		3.6%
1890	1,053		15.6%
1900	1,486		41.1%
1910	1,442		−3.0%
1920	1,203		−16.6%
1930	1,005		−16.5%
1940	967		−3.8%
1950	1,005		3.9%
1960	1,005		0.0%
1970	1,054		4.9%
1980	1,025		−2.8%
1990	950		−7.3%
2000	1,065		12.1%
2010	1,056		−0.8%
2020	974		−7.8%
U.S. Decennial Census

As of the 2020 census there were 974 people, 488 households, and 256 families residing in the city. The population density was 1,323.37 inhabitants per square mile (510.96/km^{2}). There were 497 housing units at an average density of 675.27 per square mile (260.72/km^{2}). The racial makeup of the city was 89.63% White, 2.67% African American, 0.41% Native American, 0.72% Asian, 0.00% Pacific Islander, 1.85% from other races, and 4.72% from two or more races. Hispanic or Latino of any race were 5.85% of the population.

There were 488 households, out of which 32.8% had children under the age of 18 living with them, 34.84% were married couples living together, 15.78% had a female householder with no husband present, and 47.54% were non-families. 38.52% of all households were made up of individuals, and 20.29% had someone living alone who was 65 years of age or older. The average household size was 3.05 and the average family size was 2.20.

The city's age distribution consisted of 26.6% under the age of 18, 11.0% from 18 to 24, 22.1% from 25 to 44, 22.4% from 45 to 64, and 18.0% who were 65 years of age or older. The median age was 34.9 years. For every 100 females, there were 82.2 males. For every 100 females age 18 and over, there were 78.2 males.

The median income for a household in the city was $35,179, and the median income for a family was $55,833. Males had a median income of $42,917 versus $22,917 for females. The per capita income for the city was $24,417. About 18.4% of families and 19.6% of the population were below the poverty line, including 15.7% of those under age 18 and 18.0% of those age 65 or over.
