= Marshall County, Illinois =

County in Illinois, United States

- County
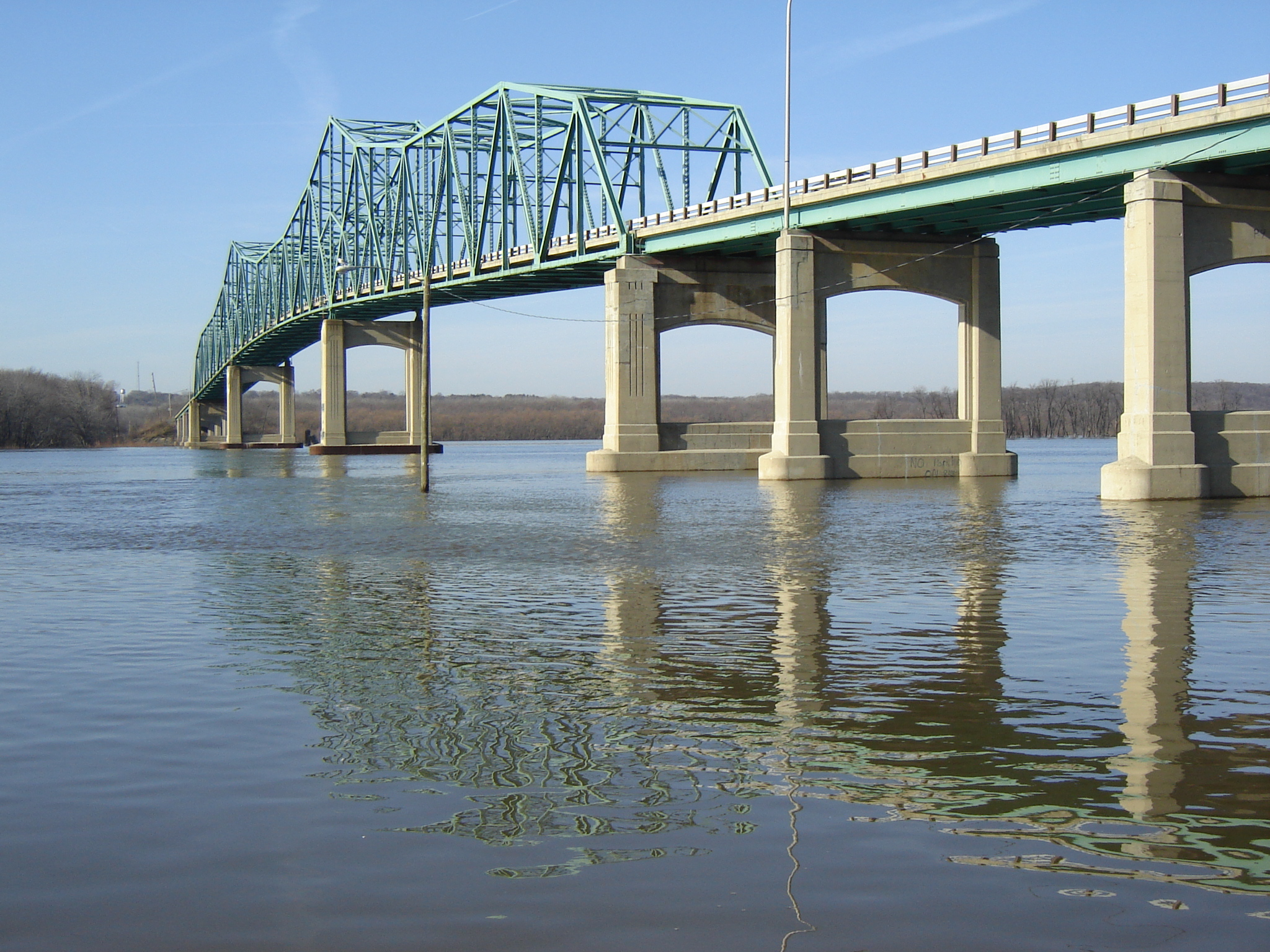
- Lacon Bridge in the county seat

- Location within the U.S. state of Illinois
- Coordinates: 41°02′N 89°20′W
- Country: United States
- State: Illinois
- Founded: January 19, 1839
- Named for: John Marshall
- Seat: Lacon
- Largest city: Henry

Area
  - Total: 399 sq mi (1,030 km^{2})
  - Land: 387 sq mi (1,000 km^{2})
  - Water: 12 sq mi (31 km^{2}) 2.9%

Population (2020)
  - Total: 11,742
  - Estimate (2025): 11,473 ▼
  - Density: 30.3/sq mi (11.7/km^{2})
- Time zone: UTC−6 (Central)
  - Summer (DST): UTC−5 (CDT)
- Congressional district: 16th
- Website: marshallcountyillinois.gov

Marshall County is a county located in the U.S. state of Illinois. According to the 2020 census, it had a population of 11,742. Its county seat is Lacon. Marshall County is part of the Peoria metropolitan area.

== History ==
Marshall County was formed in 1839 out of Putnam County. It was named in honor of John Marshall, Chief Justice of the United States Supreme Court, who died in 1835.

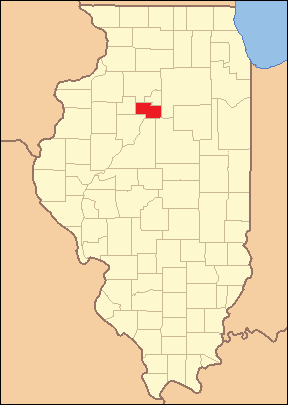
Marshall County at the time of its creation

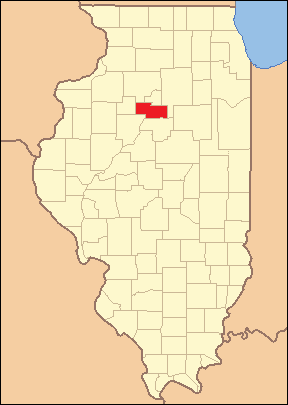
Marshall County in 1843, when its eastern border was extended to bring it to its current size

== Geography ==
According to the U.S. Census Bureau, the county has a total area of 399 square miles (1,030 km^{2}), of which 387 square miles (1,000 km^{2}) is land and 12 square miles (31 km^{2}) (2.9%) is water. The county is distinctly bisected by the Illinois River, splitting the county into two uneven sections.

=== Climate and weather ===
Lacon, Illinois

Climate chart (precipitation, max. and min. temperature)
J	F	M	A	M	J	J	A	S	O	N	D
1.6 32 15	1.6 38 21	3.1 51 31	3.8 64 41	4.2 75 51	4.1 84 60	4.1 87 64	3.5 85 62	3.5 79 54	3 67 43	3 50 32	2.3 37 21
- █ Average max. and min. temperatures in °F
- █ Precipitation totals in inches
- Source: The Weather Channel
Metric conversion
J	F	M	A	M	J	J	A	S	O	N	D
39 0 −9	41 3 −6	78 11 −1	98 18 5	107 24 11	105 29 16	105 31 18	90 29 17	89 26 12	76 19 6	77 10 0	59 3 −6
- █ Average max. and min. temperatures in °C
- █ Precipitation totals in mm

In recent years, average temperatures in the county seat of Lacon have ranged from a low of 15 °F (−9 °C) in January to a high of 87 °F (31 °C) in July, although a record low of −27 °F (−33 °C) was recorded in January 1999 and a record high of 103 °F (39 °C) was recorded in July 2005. Average monthly precipitation ranged from 1.55 inches (39 mm) in January to 4.20 inches (107 mm) in May.

=== Major highways ===
- Interstate 39
- U.S. Highway 51
- Illinois Route 17
- Illinois Route 18
- Illinois Route 26
- Illinois Route 29
- Illinois Route 40
- Illinois Route 89
- Illinois Route 117
- Illinois Route 251

=== Adjacent counties ===
- Bureau County - northwest
- Putnam County - north
- LaSalle County - east
- Woodford County - south
- Peoria County - southwest
- Stark County - west

=== National protected area ===
- Chautauqua National Wildlife Refuge (part)

== Demographics ==
Historical population
Census	Pop.	Note	%±
1840	1,849		—
1850	5,180		180.2%
1860	13,437		159.4%
1870	16,956		26.2%
1880	15,055		−11.2%
1890	13,653		−9.3%
1900	16,370		19.9%
1910	15,679		−4.2%
1920	14,760		−5.9%
1930	13,023		−11.8%
1940	13,179		1.2%
1950	13,025		−1.2%
1960	13,334		2.4%
1970	13,302		−0.2%
1980	14,479		8.8%
1990	12,846		−11.3%
2000	13,180		2.6%
2010	12,640		−4.1%
2020	11,742		−7.1%
2025 (est.)	11,473	▼	−2.3%
U.S. Decennial Census; 1790-1960 1900-1990; 1990-2000 2010

=== 2020 census ===
As of the 2020 census, the county had a population of 11,742. The median age was 46.2 years. 20.8% of residents were under the age of 18 and 23.9% of residents were 65 years of age or older. For every 100 females there were 98.8 males, and for every 100 females age 18 and over there were 98.4 males age 18 and over.

The racial makeup of the county was 93.4% White, 0.7% Black or African American, 0.3% American Indian and Alaska Native, 0.4% Asian, <0.1% Native Hawaiian and Pacific Islander, 0.9% from some other race, and 4.3% from two or more races. Hispanic or Latino residents of any race comprised 2.8% of the population.

<0.1% of residents lived in urban areas, while 100.0% lived in rural areas.

There were 4,982 households in the county, of which 25.3% had children under the age of 18 living in them. Of all households, 49.0% were married-couple households, 19.7% were households with a male householder and no spouse or partner present, and 23.5% were households with a female householder and no spouse or partner present. About 30.6% of all households were made up of individuals and 15.4% had someone living alone who was 65 years of age or older.

There were 5,819 housing units, of which 14.4% were vacant. Among occupied housing units, 79.8% were owner-occupied and 20.2% were renter-occupied. The homeowner vacancy rate was 2.4% and the rental vacancy rate was 9.6%.

=== Racial and ethnic composition ===
Marshall County, Illinois – Racial and ethnic composition Note: the US Census treats Hispanic/Latino as an ethnic category. This table excludes Latinos from the racial categories and assigns them to a separate category. Hispanics/Latinos may be of any race.
Race / Ethnicity (NH = Non-Hispanic)	Pop 1980	Pop 1990	Pop 2000	Pop 2010	Pop 2020	% 1980	% 1990	% 2000	% 2010	% 2020
White alone (NH)	14,380	12,693	12,860	12,128	10,858	99.32%	98.81%	97.57%	95.95%	92.47%
Black or African American alone (NH)	15	17	45	44	86	0.10%	0.13%	0.34%	0.35%	0.73%
Native American or Alaska Native alone (NH)	11	29	28	17	18	0.08%	0.23%	0.21%	0.13%	0.15%
Asian alone (NH)	15	26	24	43	43	0.10%	0.20%	0.18%	0.34%	0.37%
Native Hawaiian or Pacific Islander alone (NH)	x	x	1	2	0	x	x	0.01%	0.02%	0.00%
Other race alone (NH)	4	2	2	3	25	0.03%	0.02%	0.02%	0.02%	0.21%
Mixed race or Multiracial (NH)	x	x	82	89	389	x	x	0.62%	0.70%	3.31%
Hispanic or Latino (any race)	54	79	138	314	323	0.37%	0.61%	1.05%	2.48%	2.75%
Total	14,479	12,846	13,180	12,640	11,742	100.00%	100.00%	100.00%	100.00%	100.00%

=== 2010 census ===
As of the 2010 United States census, there were 12,640 people, 5,161 households, and 3,549 families living in the county. The population density was 32.7 inhabitants per square mile (12.6/km^{2}). There were 5,914 housing units at an average density of 15.3 per square mile (5.9/km^{2}). The racial makeup of the county was 97.1% white, 0.4% Asian, 0.3% black or African American, 0.2% American Indian, 1.1% from other races, and 0.9% from two or more races. Those of Hispanic or Latino origin made up 2.5% of the population. In terms of ancestry, 43.0% were German, 16.7% were Irish, 14.4% were English, 7.2% were Italian, 6.2% were American, and 6.1% were Polish.

Of the 5,161 households, 27.4% had children under the age of 18 living with them, 56.7% were married couples living together, 7.7% had a female householder with no husband present, 31.2% were non-families, and 26.8% of all households were made up of individuals. The average household size was 2.40 and the average family size was 2.88. The median age was 44.8 years.

The median income for a household in the county was $49,116 and the median income for a family was $64,781. Males had a median income of $46,793 versus $28,549 for females. The per capita income for the county was $24,991. About 6.8% of families and 9.5% of the population were below the poverty line, including 11.4% of those under age 18 and 7.0% of those age 65 or over.

== Communities ==
=== Cities ===
- Henry
- Lacon
- Toluca
- Wenona

=== Villages ===
- Hopewell
- La Rose
- Sparland
- Varna
- Washburn

=== Unincorporated communities ===
- Camp Grove
- Hopewell Estates
- La Prairie Center
- Lawn Ridge
- Leeds
- Pattonsburg
- Saratoga Center
- Wilbern

=== Townships ===
- Bell Plain
- Bennington
- Evans
- Henry
- Hopewell
- Lacon
- La Prairie
- Richland
- Roberts
- Saratoga
- Steuben
- Whitefield

== Politics ==
In its early days Marshall County was a swing county, voting for winning Whig candidate William Henry Harrison in 1840 but otherwise supporting the Democratic Party until 1852. Its reputation as a swing county was to be sustained with the growth of the Republican Party: it voted for the winning candidate in every election from 1852 to 1912 except 1884 and 1888.

Since World War I, Marshall has generally been a strongly Republican county. Only two Democrats – Franklin D. Roosevelt in 1932 and 1936 plus Lyndon Johnson in 1964 – have gained an absolute majority in Marshall County over the past twenty-six elections, although Bill Clinton won pluralities in both his elections.

United States presidential election results for Marshall County, Illinois
Year	Republican		Democratic		Third party(ies)	
Year	No.	%	No.	%	No.	%
1892	1,590	44.99%	1,834	51.90%	110	3.11%
1896	2,216	53.26%	1,888	45.37%	57	1.37%
1900	2,210	52.78%	1,908	45.57%	69	1.65%
1904	2,190	55.97%	1,545	39.48%	178	4.55%
1908	1,893	50.13%	1,714	45.39%	169	4.48%
1912	790	20.97%	1,685	44.72%	1,293	34.32%
1916	3,579	55.83%	2,593	40.45%	238	3.71%
1920	3,734	67.61%	1,568	28.39%	221	4.00%
1924	3,776	58.41%	1,836	28.40%	853	13.19%
1928	4,029	58.69%	2,828	41.19%	8	0.12%
1932	3,166	43.10%	4,133	56.27%	46	0.63%
1936	3,544	45.67%	4,149	53.47%	67	0.86%
1940	4,527	57.23%	3,343	42.26%	40	0.51%
1944	4,195	61.68%	2,596	38.17%	10	0.15%
1948	3,785	59.91%	2,514	39.79%	19	0.30%
1952	4,850	67.35%	2,343	32.54%	8	0.11%
1956	4,764	67.92%	2,245	32.01%	5	0.07%
1960	4,150	58.14%	2,981	41.76%	7	0.10%
1964	3,209	47.40%	3,561	52.60%	0	0.00%
1968	3,897	58.36%	2,455	36.77%	325	4.87%
1972	4,452	67.43%	2,141	32.43%	9	0.14%
1976	4,017	60.30%	2,570	38.58%	75	1.13%
1980	4,349	64.80%	1,903	28.36%	459	6.84%
1984	4,060	62.53%	2,386	36.75%	47	0.72%
1988	3,588	56.35%	2,742	43.07%	37	0.58%
1992	2,491	38.35%	2,819	43.40%	1,186	18.26%
1996	2,453	42.93%	2,640	46.20%	621	10.87%
2000	3,145	53.24%	2,570	43.51%	192	3.25%
2004	3,734	56.71%	2,806	42.62%	44	0.67%
2008	3,145	49.54%	3,081	48.53%	122	1.92%
2012	3,290	56.06%	2,455	41.83%	124	2.11%
2016	3,785	63.25%	1,789	29.90%	410	6.85%
2020	4,197	66.15%	2,005	31.60%	143	2.25%
2024	4,119	66.93%	1,913	31.09%	122	1.98%

== Education ==
School districts include:

- Bradford Community Unit School District 1
- Fieldcrest Community Unit School District 6
- Henry-Senachwine Consolidated Unit School District 5
- Illinois Valley Central Unit School District 321
- Lowpoint-Washburn Community Unit School District 21
- Midland Community Unit School District 7
- Princeville Community Unit School District 326
- Putnam County Community Unit School District 535
- Stark County Community Unit School District 100

== See also ==
- National Register of Historic Places listings in Marshall County, Illinois
