= Saratoga Township =

Saratoga Township may refer to:

- Saratoga Township, Howard County, Arkansas, in Howard County, Arkansas
- Saratoga Township, Grundy County, Illinois
- Saratoga Township, Marshall County, Illinois
- Saratoga Township, Howard County, Iowa
- Saratoga Township, Winona County, Minnesota
- Saratoga Township, Holt County, Nebraska
- Saratoga Township, Wilson County, North Carolina, in Wilson County, North Carolina
- Saratoga Township, LaMoure County, North Dakota, in LaMoure County, North Dakota
- Saratoga Township, Faulk County, South Dakota, in Faulk County, South Dakota
