= Lacon Township, Marshall County, Illinois =

Coordinates: 40°58′42″N 89°25′35″W

Lacon Township
- Township
- Location in Marshall County

- Marshall County's location in Illinois
- Country: United States
- State: Illinois
- County: Marshall
- Established: November 6, 1849

Area
  - Total: 21.94 sq mi (56.8 km^{2})
  - Land: 17.29 sq mi (44.8 km^{2})
  - Water: 4.65 sq mi (12.0 km^{2}) 21.19%

Population (2010)
  - Estimate (2016): 2,351
- Time zone: UTC-6 (CST)
  - Summer (DST): UTC-5 (CDT)
- FIPS code: 17-123-40572

Lacon Township is located in Marshall County, Illinois, USA. As of the 2010 census, its population was 2,501 and it contained 1,116 housing units.

== History ==
Lacon Township takes its name from Laconia, a region of Greece.

== Geography ==
According to the 2010 census, the township has a total area of 21.94 square miles (56.8 km^{2}), of which 17.29 square miles (44.8 km^{2}) (or 78.81%) is land and 4.65 square miles (12.0 km^{2}) (or 21.19%) is water.

== Demographics ==
Historical population
Census	Pop.	Note	%±
2016 (est.)	2,351
U.S. Decennial Census

== See also ==
- Lacon, Illinois
