= Richland Township, Marshall County, Illinois =

Coordinates: 40°58′21″N 89°19′28″W

Richland Township
- Township
- Location in Marshall County

- Marshall County's location in Illinois
- Country: United States
- State: Illinois
- County: Marshall
- Established: November 6, 1849

Area
  - Total: 36.01 sq mi (93.3 km^{2})
  - Land: 35.99 sq mi (93.2 km^{2})
  - Water: 0.01 sq mi (0.026 km^{2}) 0.03%

Population (2010)
  - Estimate (2016): 423
  - Density: 12.4/sq mi (4.8/km^{2})
- Time zone: UTC-6 (CST)
  - Summer (DST): UTC-5 (CDT)
- FIPS code: 17-123-63589

Richland Township is located in Marshall County, Illinois. As of the 2010 census, its population was 446 and it contained 195 housing units.

== Geography ==
According to the 2010 census, the township has a total area of 36.01 square miles (93.3 km^{2}), of which 35.99 square miles (93.2 km^{2}) (or 99.94%) is land and 0.01 square miles (0.026 km^{2}) (or 0.03%) is water.

== Demographics ==
Historical population
Census	Pop.	Note	%±
2016 (est.)	423
U.S. Decennial Census
