= Hopewell Township, Marshall County, Illinois =

Coordinates: 41°03′02″N 89°19′59″W

Hopewell Township
- Township
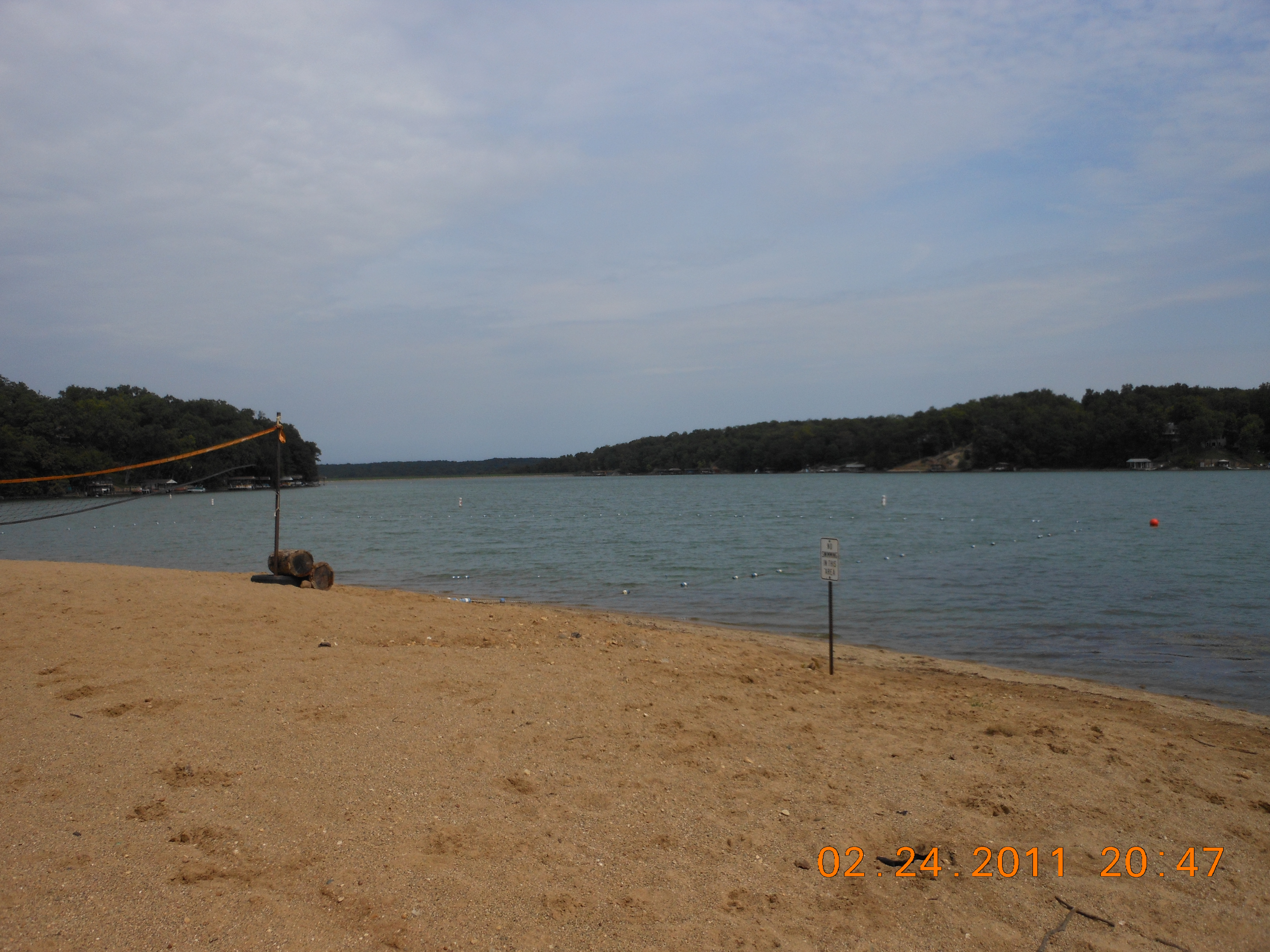
- Beach at Lake Wildwood in northeastern Hopewell Township

- Location in Marshall County

- Marshall County's location in Illinois
- Country: United States
- State: Illinois
- County: Marshall
- Established: November 6, 1849

Area
  - Total: 36.08 sq mi (93.4 km^{2})
  - Land: 33.79 sq mi (87.5 km^{2})
  - Water: 2.29 sq mi (5.9 km^{2}) 6.35%

Population (2010)
  - Estimate (2016): 534
  - Density: 16.6/sq mi (6.4/km^{2})
- Time zone: UTC-6 (CST)
  - Summer (DST): UTC-5 (CDT)
- FIPS code: 17-123-36152

Hopewell Township is located in Marshall County, Illinois. As of the 2010 census, its population was 562 and it contained 387 housing units.

== Geography ==
According to the 2010 census, the township has a total area of 36.08 square miles (93.4 km^{2}), of which 33.79 square miles (87.5 km^{2}) (or 93.65%) is land and 2.29 square miles (5.9 km^{2}) (or 6.35%) is water.

== Demographics ==
Historical population
Census	Pop.	Note	%±
2016 (est.)	534
U.S. Decennial Census
