= Roberts Township, Marshall County, Illinois =

Coordinates: 41°03′28″N 89°13′05″W

Roberts Township
- Township
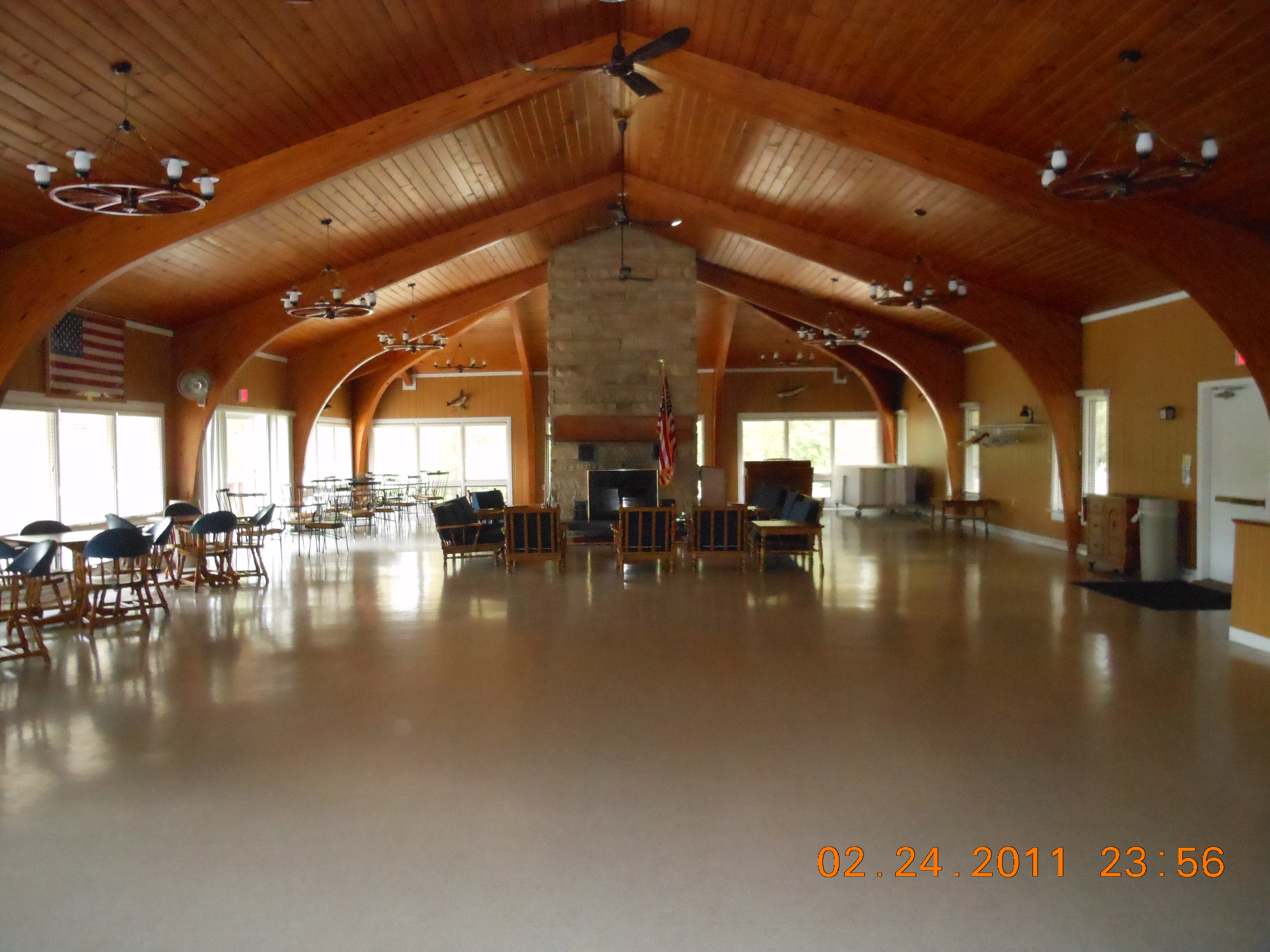
- Clubhouse on the Roberts Township side of Lake Wildwood

- Location in Marshall County

- Marshall County's location in Illinois
- Country: United States
- State: Illinois
- County: Marshall
- Established: November 6, 1849

Area
  - Total: 37.79 sq mi (97.9 km^{2})
  - Land: 37.7 sq mi (98 km^{2})
  - Water: 0.1 sq mi (0.26 km^{2}) 0.26%

Population (2010)
  - Estimate (2016): 879
  - Density: 24.5/sq mi (9.5/km^{2})
- Time zone: UTC-6 (CST)
  - Summer (DST): UTC-5 (CDT)
- FIPS code: 17-123-64668

Roberts Township is located in Marshall County, Illinois. As of the 2010 census, its population was 925 and it contained 544 housing units.

== Geography ==
According to the 2010 census, the township has a total area of 37.79 square miles (97.9 km^{2}), of which 37.7 square miles (98 km^{2}) (or 99.76%) is land and 0.1 square miles (0.26 km^{2}) (or 0.26%) is water.

== Demographics ==
Historical population
| Census | Pop. | Note | %± |
|---|---|---|---|
| 2016 (est.) | 879 |
U.S. Decennial Census
