= Lacon Bridge =

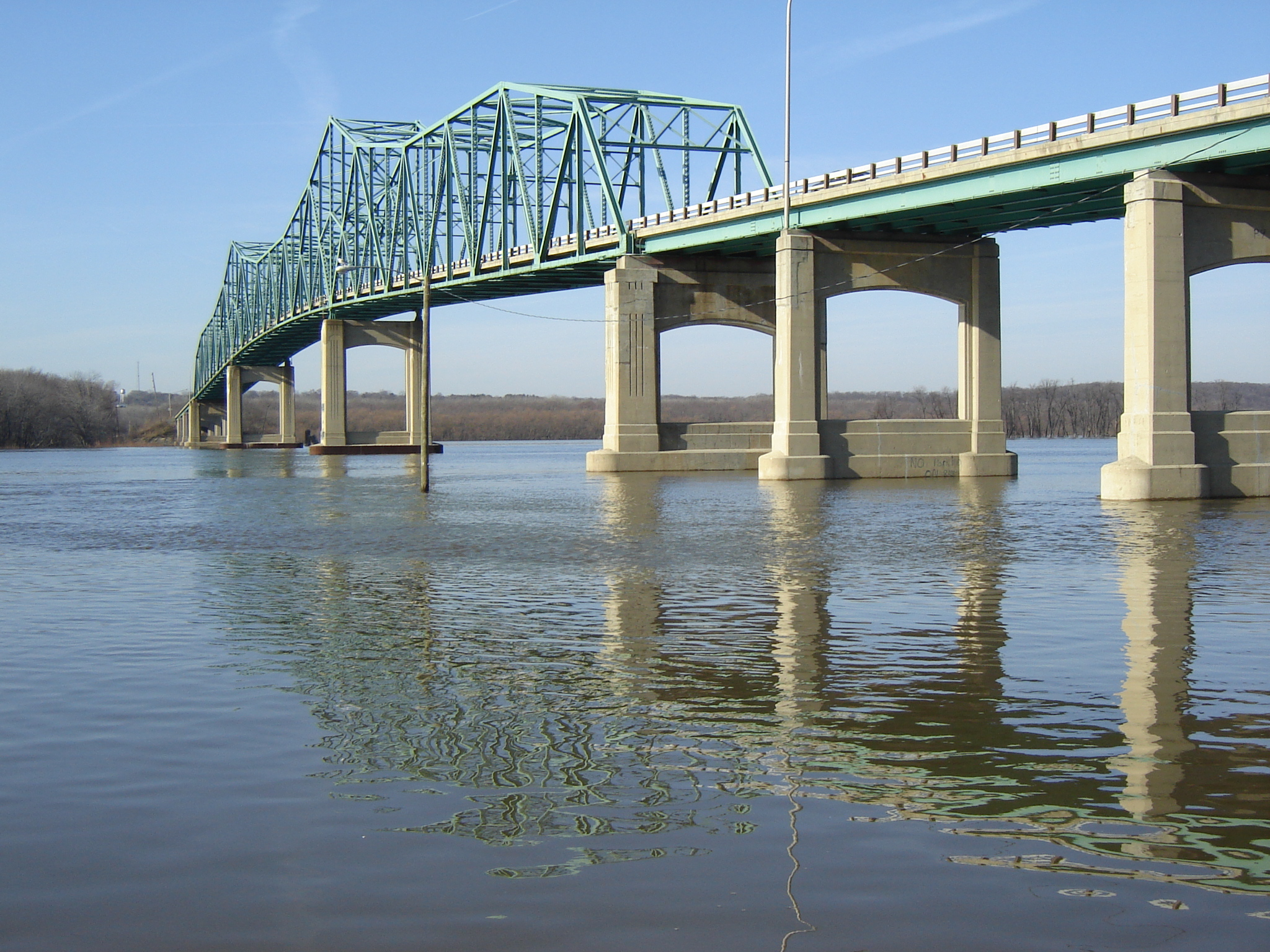
- Crossing over the Illinois River at Lacon, Illinois
- Coordinates: 41°01′32.43″N 89°25′00.28″W
- Carries: Two lanes of Illinois Route 17
- Crosses: Illinois River
- Locale: Lacon, Illinois
- Official name: Lacon Bridge
- Maintained by: Illinois Department of Transportation
- ID number: 000062000314852

Characteristics
- Design: Continuous truss bridge
- Total length: 1,573 feet, 378 feet at its longest span
- Width: 2 traffic lanes, 26 feet (7.9 meters)
- Height: 60 feet above water, 500 feet above sea level
- Longest span: 114 m

History
- Opened: 1939

The Lacon Bridge crosses the Illinois River in the community of Lacon, Illinois. Built in 1939, it is one of the oldest crossings of the Illinois River.
