= Henry Township, Marshall County, Illinois =

Coordinates: 41°07′09″N 89°22′37″W

Henry Township
- Township
- Location in Marshall County

- Marshall County's location in Illinois
- Country: United States
- State: Illinois
- County: Marshall
- Established: November 6, 1849

Area
  - Total: 16.41 sq mi (42.5 km^{2})
  - Land: 14.6 sq mi (38 km^{2})
  - Water: 1.81 sq mi (4.7 km^{2}) 11.03%

Population (2010)
  - Estimate (2016): 2,534
  - Density: 185/sq mi (71/km^{2})
- Time zone: UTC-6 (CST)
  - Summer (DST): UTC-5 (CDT)
- FIPS code: 17-123-34176

Henry Township is located in Marshall County, Illinois. At the 2020 census, its population was 2,558.

== History ==
Henry Township is named for Gen. James D. Henry.

== Geography ==
According to the 2010 census, the township has a total area of 16.41 square miles (42.5 km^{2}), of which 14.6 square miles (38 km^{2}) (or 88.97%) is land and 1.81 square miles (4.7 km^{2}) (or 11.03%) is water.

== Demographics ==
=== 2010s census ===
At the 2010 census, its population was 2,700 and it contained 1,227 housing units.

=== 2020s census ===
At the 2020 census, Henry Township had 1,202 housing units. Of the population, 1,212 were male and 1,346 were female.

Historical population
Census	Pop.	Note	%±
2016 (est.)	2,534
U.S. Decennial Census
