= Roanoke, Illinois =

Roanoke
- Village
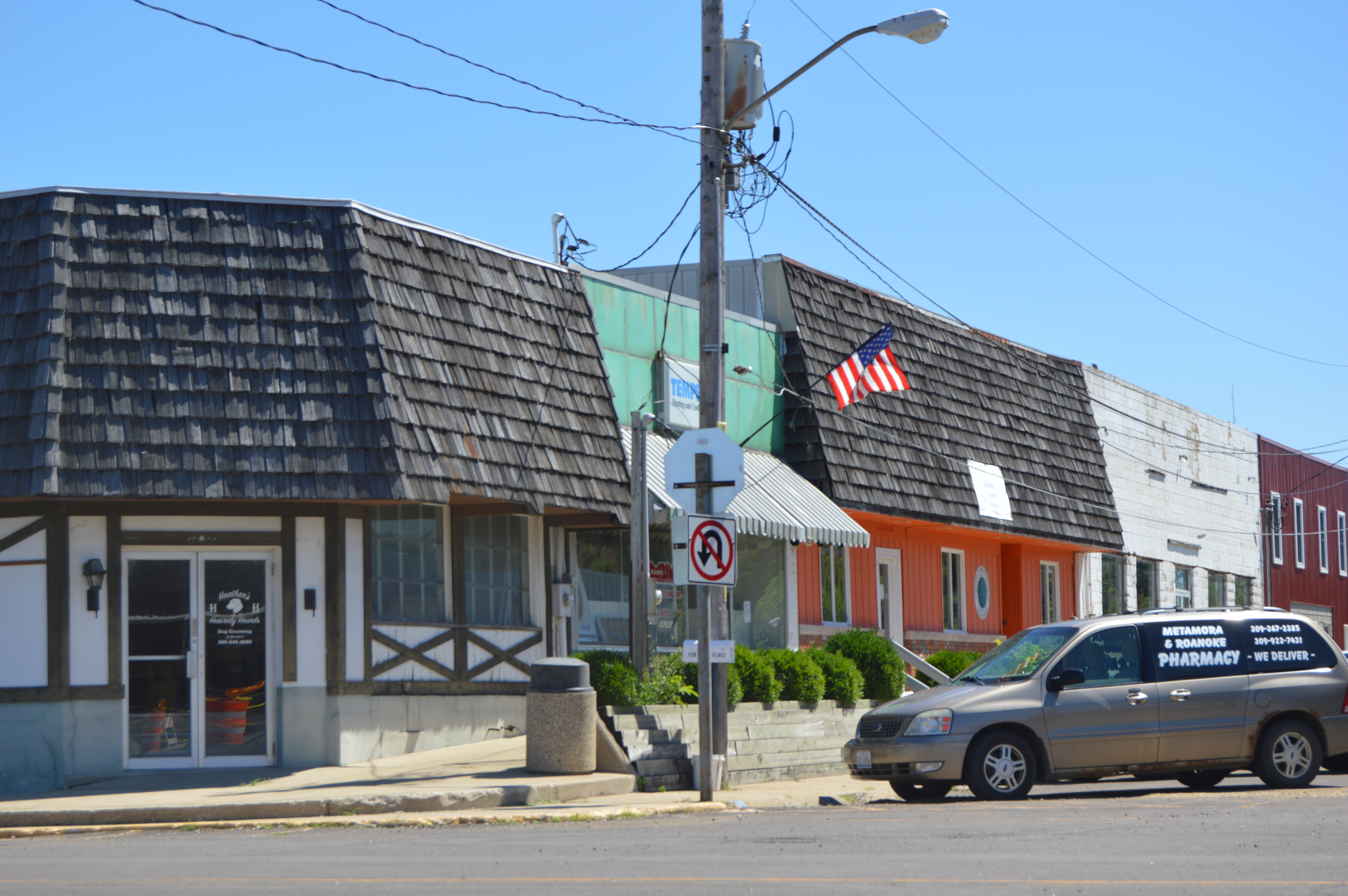
- Broad Street downtown

- Location of Roanoke in Woodford County, Illinois.
- Coordinates: 40°47′49″N 89°12′08″W
- Country: United States
- State: Illinois
- County: Woodford
- Founded: 1874
- Named for: Roanoke, Virginia

Government
  - Mayor: Patrick Ratliffe

Area
  - Total: 0.97 sq mi (2.52 km^{2})
  - Land: 0.94 sq mi (2.43 km^{2})
  - Water: 0.035 sq mi (0.09 km^{2})
- Elevation: 735 ft (224 m)

Population (2020)
  - Total: 1,960
  - Estimate (2024): 1,928
  - Density: 2,090.0/sq mi (806.94/km^{2})
- Time zone: UTC-6 (CST)
  - Summer (DST): UTC-5 (CDT)
- ZIP Code(s): 61561
- Area code: 309
- FIPS code: 17-64590
- GNIS feature ID: 2399095
- Website: www.roanokeil.org

Roanoke is a village in Roanoke Township, Woodford County, Illinois, United States. The population was 1,960 at the 2020 census. It is part of the Peoria, Illinois Metropolitan Statistical Area.

== History ==
=== Early settlement ===
Until about 1850, much of northern Illinois was still frontier land and sparsely populated, which the exception of Chicago and towns along the rivers. This changed in 1850, when President Millard Fillmore signed a land grant for the construction of the Illinois Central Railroad, lobbied for by then-lawyers Stephen Douglas and Abraham Lincoln. With the railroad expanding into Central Illinois, new opportunities for settlement by German, Dutch, Irish, Italian, Swedish, and other European immigrants opened up in Woodford County.

Roanoke was one of these settlements. On December 17, 1872, Roanoke was mapped out and lots were offered for sale. The plat of Roanoke was composed of 15 blocks and was bounded by Main, Front, Ann and Pleasant Streets. Two years later in 1874, Roanoke officially became a "Village" in the State of Illinois. Building began immediately in Roanoke and by the time the railroad was complete the population had increased to three hundred. On August 15, 1874, the first election was held for the purpose of electing six trustees for the Village of Roanoke. To this day, the Village has continually filled those six positions. Its name comes from Roanoke, Virginia, from which some of the village's earliest settlers arrived.

=== Coal mining ===
The Roanoke area, like most of Illinois, is underlain by rich veins of coal. The second coal shaft in Woodford County was sunk in Roanoke in 1881. Another shaft started in a westerly direction, but this coal was "flinty", or mixed with rock, and digging was discontinued. The mine at its peak employed around 300 men and hoisted 500 tons of coal a day.

As was the case in most small mining towns, life in the mines could be dangerous. In the June 29th, 1906, four men fell 400 feet down the main shaft to their deaths while performing maintenance and improvements to the main shaft. After the accident, the coal mine continued to operate until 1940, when it was permanently closed due to safety concerns and maintenance issues. In 1941, due to its state of disrepair, the tipple at the mine head collapsed into the shaft, leaving a crater. The crater was filled in, and the remaining equipment sold as scrap.

Slate, flint, and other non-coal slag from the old mine was collected into a large mound colloquially called the "Jumbo," on the southern side of the village near where the mine was once located. Since before the mine closed, it is estimated that 800,000 tons of slag from the Jumbo has been used in various road and town improvement construction projects. Although smaller than its original size, the Jumbo still stands at present, topped with an electric star that is illuminated during the Christmas season.

=== Railroad closure ===
After the Roanoke mine stopped operation in 1940, and with the growing popularity of using Semi-trailer trucks to move crops from farm to market, the rail line running through Roanoke was eventually retired in the mid-1980s, and was promptly dismantled for scrap. The original Roanoke rail station still stands as a historic building.

=== 2004 tornado ===
On July 13, 2004, an F4 tornado demolished several rural houses and properties, and the Parsons Manufacturing Plant approximately 4 miles (6.4 km) west of downtown Roanoke. While over 200 people were still inside the Parsons plant at the time, the event was notable because there were no serious injuries or fatalities, and also because numerous photos and videos were taken of it.

== Geography ==
According to the 2010 census, Roanoke has a total area of 0.957 square miles (2.48 km^{2}), of which 0.92 square miles (2.38 km^{2}) (or 96.13%) is land and 0.037 square miles (0.10 km^{2}) (or 3.87%) is water.

== Demographics ==
Historical population
| Census | Pop. | Note | %± |
|---|---|---|---|
| 1880 | 355 | | — |
| 1890 | 831 | | 134.1% |
| 1900 | 966 | | 16.2% |
| 1910 | 1,311 | | 35.7% |
| 1920 | 1,368 | | 4.3% |
| 1930 | 1,088 | | −20.5% |
| 1940 | 1,090 | | 0.2% |
| 1950 | 1,368 | | 25.5% |
| 1960 | 1,821 | | 33.1% |
| 1970 | 2,040 | | 12.0% |
| 1980 | 2,001 | | −1.9% |
| 1990 | 1,910 | | −4.5% |
| 2000 | 1,994 | | 4.4% |
| 2010 | 2,065 | | 3.6% |
| 2020 | 1,960 | | −5.1% |
U.S. Decennial Census

=== 2020 census ===
As of the 2020 census, Roanoke had a population of 1,960. The median age was 41.8 years. 23.2% of residents were under the age of 18 and 22.8% of residents were 65 years of age or older. For every 100 females there were 100.0 males, and for every 100 females age 18 and over there were 97.4 males age 18 and over.

0.0% of residents lived in urban areas, while 100.0% lived in rural areas.

There were 798 households in Roanoke, of which 26.2% had children under the age of 18 living in them. Of all households, 56.8% were married-couple households, 17.3% were households with a male householder and no spouse or partner present, and 20.8% were households with a female householder and no spouse or partner present. About 27.9% of all households were made up of individuals and 14.7% had someone living alone who was 65 years of age or older.

There were 855 housing units, of which 6.7% were vacant. The homeowner vacancy rate was 1.7% and the rental vacancy rate was 7.7%.

Racial composition as of the 2020 census
| Race | Number | Percent |
|---|---|---|
| White | 1,885 | 96.2% |
| Black or African American | 10 | 0.5% |
| American Indian and Alaska Native | 2 | 0.1% |
| Asian | 4 | 0.2% |
| Native Hawaiian and Other Pacific Islander | 1 | 0.1% |
| Some other race | 7 | 0.4% |
| Two or more races | 51 | 2.6% |
| Hispanic or Latino (of any race) | 33 | 1.7% |

=== 2000 census ===
As of the census of 2000, there were 1,994 people, 765 households, and 559 families residing in the village. The population density was 2,192.0 inhabitants per square mile (846.3/km^{2}). There were 809 housing units at an average density of 889.3 units per square mile (343.4 units/km^{2}). The racial makeup of the village was 99.15% White, 0.10% African American, 0.10% Native American, 0.05% Asian, 0.10% from other races, and 0.50% from two or more races. Hispanic or Latino of any race were 0.15% of the population.

There were 765 households, out of which 31.5% had children under the age of 18 living with them, 64.6% were married couples living together, 6.4% had a female householder with no husband present, and 26.8% were non-families. 25.0% of all households were made up of individuals, and 14.8% had someone living alone who was 65 years of age or older. The average household size was 2.52 and the average family size was 3.00.

In the village, the population was spread out, with 24.3% under the age of 18, 7.6% from 18 to 24, 24.8% from 25 to 44, 21.4% from 45 to 64, and 21.9% who were 65 years of age or older. The median age was 40 years. For every 100 females there were 96.1 males. For every 100 females age 18 and over, there were 91.5 males.

The median income for a household in the village was $43,125, and the median income for a family was $54,750. Males had a median income of $38,375 versus $22,614 for females. The per capita income for the village was $24,489. About 2.9% of families and 4.9% of the population were below the poverty line, including 6.3% of those under age 18 and 2.5% of those age 65 or over.

== Education ==
It is in the Roanoke-Benson Community Unit School District 60.

== Notable people ==
- Frank Frantz (1872–1941), Rough Rider and the final Governor of Oklahoma Territory
- Glen Gray (1900–1963), jazz saxophonist and orchestra leader
- William E. Warner, industrial arts professor at Ohio State University and founder of Epsilon Pi Tau honor society
