= Speer, Illinois =

- Unincorporated community
- Location within Illinois Location within the United States
- Coordinates: 40°59′18″N 89°39′01″W
- Country: United States
- State: Illinois
- County: Stark
- Elevation: 742 ft (226 m)
- Time zone: UTC-6 (Central (CST))
  - Summer (DST): UTC-5 (CDT)
- ZIP code: 61479
- Area code: 309
- GNIS feature ID: 423196

Speer is an unincorporated community in Stark County, Illinois, United States, located 8 miles (13 km) southeast of Wyoming. Speer has a post office with ZIP code 61479.

== History ==
A post office called Speer has been in operation since 1902. The community was named for E. K. and E. M. Speer, the original owners of the town site.
