= Pattonsburg, Illinois =

- Unincorporated community
- Location within Illinois Location within the United States
- Coordinates: 40°56′16″N 89°11′04″W
- Country: United States
- State: Illinois
- County: Marshall
- Elevation: 679 ft (207 m)
- Time zone: UTC-6 (Central (CST))
  - Summer (DST): UTC-5 (CDT)
- Area code: 309
- GNIS feature ID: 415456

Pattonsburg is an unincorporated community in Marshall County, Illinois, United States, located 6 miles (9.7 km) east-northeast of Washburn.
