= Saratoga Township, Marshall County, Illinois =

Coordinates: 41°06′03″N 89°34′56″W

Saratoga Township
- Township
- Location in Marshall County

- Marshall County's location in Illinois
- Country: United States
- State: Illinois
- County: Marshall
- Established: Before 1860

Area
  - Total: 35.96 sq mi (93.1 km^{2})
  - Land: 35.9 sq mi (93 km^{2})
  - Water: 0.06 sq mi (0.16 km^{2}) 0.17%

Population (2010)
  - Estimate (2016): 271
  - Density: 8/sq mi (3.1/km^{2})
- Time zone: UTC-6 (CST)
  - Summer (DST): UTC-5 (CDT)
- FIPS code: 17-123-67691

Saratoga Township is located in Marshall County, Illinois. As of the 2010 census, its population was 286 and it contained 135 housing units. Saratoga Township formed from a portion of Whitefield Township sometime before 1860.

== Geography ==
According to the 2010 census, the township has a total area of 35.96 square miles (93.1 km^{2}), of which 35.9 square miles (93 km^{2}) (or 99.83%) is land and 0.06 square miles (0.16 km^{2}) (or 0.17%) is water.

== Demographics ==
Historical population
Census	Pop.	Note	%±
2016 (est.)	271
U.S. Decennial Census
