= Whitefield Township, Marshall County, Illinois =

Coordinates: 41°06′33″N 89°28′02″W

Whitefield Township
- Township
- Location in Marshall County

- Marshall County's location in Illinois
- Country: United States
- State: Illinois
- County: Marshall
- Established: November 6, 1849

Area
  - Total: 36.77 sq mi (95.2 km^{2})
  - Land: 36.76 sq mi (95.2 km^{2})
  - Water: 0.01 sq mi (0.026 km^{2}) 0.03%

Population (2010)
  - Estimate (2016): 287
  - Density: 8.2/sq mi (3.2/km^{2})
- Time zone: UTC-6 (CST)
  - Summer (DST): UTC-5 (CDT)
- FIPS code: 17-123-81230

Whitefield Township is located in Marshall County, Illinois. As of the 2010 census, its population was 302 and it contained 138 housing units.

== Geography ==
According to the 2010 census, the township has a total area of 36.77 square miles (95.2 km^{2}), of which 36.76 square miles (95.2 km^{2}) (or 99.97%) is land and 0.01 square miles (0.026 km^{2}) (or 0.03%) is water.

== Demographics ==
Historical population
Census	Pop.	Note	%±
2016 (est.)	287
U.S. Decennial Census
