= Evans Township, Marshall County, Illinois =

Coordinates: 41°03′24″N 89°06′45″W

Evans Township
- Township
- Location in Marshall County

- Marshall County's location in Illinois
- Country: United States
- State: Illinois
- County: Marshall
- Established: November 6, 1849

Area
  - Total: 37.12 sq mi (96.1 km^{2})
  - Land: 37.08 sq mi (96.0 km^{2})
  - Water: 0.04 sq mi (0.10 km^{2}) 0.11%

Population (2010)
  - Estimate (2016): 1,242
  - Density: 35.7/sq mi (13.8/km^{2})
- Time zone: UTC-6 (CST)
  - Summer (DST): UTC-5 (CDT)
- FIPS code: 17-123-24569

Evans Township is located in Marshall County, Illinois. As of the 2010 census, its population was 1,322 and it contained 591 housing units.

== Geography ==
According to the 2010 census, the township has a total area of 37.12 square miles (96.1 km^{2}), of which 37.08 square miles (96.0 km^{2}) (or 99.89%) is land and 0.04 square miles (0.10 km^{2}) (or 0.11%) is water.

== Demographics ==
Historical population
Census	Pop.	Note	%±
2016 (est.)	1,242
U.S. Decennial Census
