= Steuben Township, Marshall County, Illinois =

Coordinates: 41°01′20″N 89°28′22″W

Steuben Township
- Township
- Location in Marshall County

- Marshall County's location in Illinois
- Country: United States
- State: Illinois
- County: Marshall
- Established: November 6, 1849

Area
  - Total: 31.52 sq mi (81.6 km^{2})
  - Land: 28.85 sq mi (74.7 km^{2})
  - Water: 2.66 sq mi (6.9 km^{2}) 8.44%

Population (2010)
  - Estimate (2016): 1,129
  - Density: 40.3/sq mi (15.6/km^{2})
- Time zone: UTC-6 (CST)
  - Summer (DST): UTC-5 (CDT)
- FIPS code: 17-123-72585

Steuben Township is located in Marshall County, Illinois. As of the 2010 census, its population was 1,163 and it contained 504 housing units.

== Geography ==
According to the 2010 census, the township has a total area of 31.52 square miles (81.6 km^{2}), of which 28.85 square miles (74.7 km^{2}) (or 91.53%) is land and 2.66 square miles (6.9 km^{2}) (or 8.44%) is water.

== Demographics ==
Historical population
Census	Pop.	Note	%±
2016 (est.)	1,129
U.S. Decennial Census
