= La Prairie Township, Marshall County, Illinois =

Coordinates: 41°01′10″N 89°34′59″W

La Prairie Township
- Township
- Location in Marshall County

- Marshall County's location in Illinois
- Country: United States
- State: Illinois
- County: Marshall
- Established: November 6, 1849

Area
  - Total: 36.01 sq mi (93.3 km^{2})
  - Land: 36.01 sq mi (93.3 km^{2})
  - Water: 0 sq mi (0 km^{2}) 0%

Population (2010)
  - Estimate (2016): 345
  - Density: 10.1/sq mi (3.9/km^{2})
- Time zone: UTC-6 (CST)
  - Summer (DST): UTC-5 (CDT)
- FIPS code: 17-123-42093

La Prairie Township is located in Marshall County, Illinois. As of the 2010 census, its population was 364 and it contained 158 housing units. La Prairie Township was originally named Fairfield Township, but changed its name in December, 1850.

== Geography ==
According to the 2010 census, the township has a total area of 36.01 square miles (93.3 km^{2}), all land.

== Demographics ==
Historical population
| Census | Pop. | Note | %± |
|---|---|---|---|
| 2016 (est.) | 345 |
U.S. Decennial Census
