= National Register of Historic Places listings in Woodford County, Illinois =

Location of Woodford County in Illinois

This is a list of the National Register of Historic Places listings in Woodford County, Illinois.

This is intended to be a complete list of the properties and districts on the National Register of Historic Places in Woodford County, Illinois, United States. Latitude and longitude coordinates are provided for many National Register properties and districts; these locations may be seen together in a map.

There are 7 properties and districts listed on the National Register in the county, and one former listing.

This National Park Service list is complete through NPS recent listings posted December 12, 2025.

== Current listings ==
	Name on the Register	Image	Date listed	Location	City or town	Description
1	El Paso Public Library	El Paso Public Library	August 16, 1994 (#94000972)	149 W. First St. 40°44′22″N 89°01′06″W	El Paso	
2	Eureka College Administration and Chapel	Eureka College Administration and Chapel	May 31, 1980 (#80001426)	300 College Ave. 40°42′50″N 89°16′09″W	Eureka	
3	Eureka College Campus Historic District	Eureka College Campus Historic District	June 14, 2010 (#10000365)	300 College Ave. 40°42′52″N 89°16′12″W	Eureka	
4	Illinois Central Railroad and Toledo, Peoria, and Western Railroad Freight House	Illinois Central Railroad and Toledo, Peoria, and Western Railroad Freight House	August 16, 1994 (#94000973)	8-10 E. Front St. 40°44′17″N 89°00′56″W	El Paso	
5	Metamora Courthouse	Metamora Courthouse	March 30, 1978 (#78001203)	113 E. Partridge St. 40°47′30″N 89°21′45″W	Metamora	
6	Joseph Schertz House	Joseph Schertz House	April 20, 1995 (#95000491)	Illinois Route 116, 1 mile west of the city limits 40°46′43″N 89°24′35″W	Metamora	
7	Adlai E. Stevenson I House	Adlai E. Stevenson I House	March 18, 1980 (#80001427)	104 W. Walnut St. 40°47′22″N 89°21′48″W	Metamora	

== Former listings ==
	Name on the Register	Image	Date listed	Date removed	Location	City or town	Description
1	Benson Water Tower	Benson Water Tower	November 20, 1987 (#87002034)	January 2, 2020	Clayton St. between Front and Pleasant Sts. 40°51′04″N 89°07′13″W	Benson	

== See also ==
- List of National Historic Landmarks in Illinois
- National Register of Historic Places listings in Illinois
