= Bern Shanks =

Resource management researcher (born 1940)

- Born: April 4, 1940 (age 84); El Paso, Illinois, United States
- Education: Ph.D., Michigan State University; M.S., Montana State University; B.A., Montana State University
- Occupation(s): Public administrator, conservationist, author
- Board member of: Defenders of Wildlife (1983–1992); The Wilderness Society (1978–1982)

Bernard Duane Shanks (born April 4, 1940) is an American environmental scientist, educator, public administrator, outdoorsman, conservationist, and author. He has been an outspoken advocate for public lands preservation and natural resources regulation. The author of several nonfiction books on topics related to the American West, Shanks taught natural resources management at Utah State University, served as director of the Washington Department of Fish and Wildlife, sat on the boards of directors of The Wilderness Society and Defenders of Wildlife, and supervised regional research programs at the U.S. Geological Survey.

== Early life and education ==
Bern Shanks was born in El Paso, Illinois, to Arthur Shanks and Grace Shanks (née Arnold). After graduating high school, he worked as a fire lookout in Yellowstone National Park for 12 weeks, later crediting the solitary post as giving him "time to think about the environment". Shanks served in the U.S. Marine Corps Reserve and worked as a smokejumper with the U.S. Forest Service in Alaska and Montana. According to environmental historian Jedediah Rogers, "once introduced to the West he became a real outdoors enthusiast".

Shanks later earned a Bachelor of Science degree in biology from Montana State University, thereafter going to work for the National Park Service (NPS) analyzing grazing licenses at Grand Teton National Park. Disillusioned by government work due to what he believed were improper concessions being given to United States Senator Clifford Hansen, who grazed his cattle in the park, Shanks resigned from his job at the NPS. He enrolled in graduate school, earning a Master of Science in Earth Science from Montana State. He went on to complete a Ph.D. in Natural Resource Development at Michigan State University in 1974 where his thesis, completed under the supervision of Eckhart Dersch and inspired by the ideas of Ronald Horvath, was Indicators of Missouri River Project Effects on Local Residents.

== Career ==
=== Early career ===
Shanks began his career teaching at Utah State University. At Utah State, he spoke extensively against the Sagebrush Rebellion, asserting that the movement was motivated by private interests and big business, and not a sense of patriotism as supporters claimed. Following a 1980 letter of complaint to the university president from some in the Sagebrush movement, Shanks departed Utah State. Shanks subsequently served as director of planning for the Arizona parks department and as policy advisor on land management issues in the office of the governor of California. He later spent five years as director of the Center for California Studies at California State University, Sacramento.

=== Washington Department of Fish and Wildlife ===
"Wild salmon are in crisis. We have talked about troubled fish runs in Washington state for years. All the compromises have been made and wild salmon continue their downward spiral. Wild salmon have been here thousands of years. They are a heritage as well as a resource. The only ethical response is to shift this agency's focus to their recovery."

— Bern Shanks (March 27, 1997)

In 1996, Shanks was hired as director of the Washington Department of Fish and Wildlife (WDFW). He was described by Spokesman Review columnist Rich Landers as "the most open and accessible state wildlife chief in memory". The following year, Shanks assigned observers to commercial purse seiners to monitor bycatch; Shanks would later describe the findings of that survey — which reported significant bycatch of Chinook Salmon in a fishery intended to catch other species — as "unconscionable" and "obscene". That year, Shanks announced a draft policy intended to save Washington's collapsing wild salmon runs, blaming the department's own past management practices for the poor state of fisheries conservation in the state and warning that the federal government would attempt intervention if the department did not act.

After Shanks moved to impose stricter regulations on the commercial fishing industry, pressure mounted on him from some members of the state's Fish and Wildlife Commission to resign, ostensibly due to a $17 million shortfall in the department's budget resulting from lower-than-expected fishing license fees. Dan McDonald, the Republican majority leader in the state senate, signaled his support for Shanks as did a coalition of 16 conservation groups, including the Audubon Society. Nevertheless, under increasing pressure, Shanks was compelled to resign in June 1998.

Writing in Salmon Without Rivers: A History Of The Pacific Salmon Crisis, author Jim Lichatowich describes the department's budget issues as an excuse to force Shanks from office while the real impetus was political pressure exerted by the commercial fishing industry. Spokesman Review columnist Rich Landers, meanwhile, notes that WDFW's budget shortfall was similar to what sibling agencies in Oregon and Idaho experienced during the same time and was the result of issues that predated Shanks' arrival; he described the move against Shanks as "political tricks" originating in the office of the governor of Washington. Bob Oke, chairman of the state senate's natural resources committee and a Shanks supporter, called Shanks' resignation "a dark day, the lowest ebb of the department". Reporting on Shanks' resignation, the AP's David Ammons wrote that he had a "reputation as a fierce advocate for dwindling fish and wildlife stock ... [that] pitted him against user groups, particularly commercial fishermen". According to The News Tribune, Shanks "lost his job on what many believe were trumped-up charges" after "he tried to bring the [commercial fishing industry] under control".

=== Later career ===
After leaving the WDFW, Shanks worked for the U.S. Geological Survey (USGS), where he was charged with overseeing 11 state units in the USGS Cooperative Research Units Program. As of 2024, he is a member of the board of directors of the Resource Renewal Institute, which describes itself as advocating "for the conservation, preservation, and restoration of our public lands for current and future generations".

== Personal life ==
Shanks is married and has a son. He lives in the San Juan Islands. In a 1985 article for Sports Illustrated chronicling a ski trip with Shanks and Governor of Arizona Bruce Babbitt, Kenny Moore described him as a "mild, wry man".

== Works ==
=== Books ===
- California Wildlife. Helena, MT: Falcon Press Pub. Co. 1989. ISBN 978-0-937959-47-3. OCLC 21341564.
- Wilderness Survival. New York: Universe Books. 1980. ISBN 978-0-87663-343-4. OCLC 6422567 – via Internet Archive.
- This Land Is Your Land: The Struggle to Save America's Public Lands. San Francisco: Sierra Club Books. 1984. ISBN 978-0-87156-822-9. OCLC 10605706 – via Internet Archive.

=== Journal articles ===
- "Missouri River Development Policy and Rural Community Development". Journal of the American Water Resources Association. 13 (2): 255–264. 1977. Bibcode:1977JAWRA..13..255S. doi:10.1111/j.1752-1688.1977.tb02022.x.
- "The American Indian and Missouri River Water Developments". Journal of the American Water Resources Association. 10 (3): 255–264. 1974. Bibcode:1974JAWRA..10..573S. doi:10.1111/j.1752-1688.1974.tb00598.x.

== See also ==
- Bernard Frank
