= Clifford J. Vogelsang =

American lawyer and businessman

Clifford Johnston Vogelsang (November 20, 1892 – May 8, 1933) was an American lawyer and businessman.

Vogelsang was born in El Paso, Illinois. He graduated from Illinois Wesleyan University, where he was a member of Tau Kappa Epsilon fraternity, and was admitted to the Illinois bar. Vogelsang practiced law in Pana, Illinois and then moved to Taylorville, Illinois where he continued to practice law. Vogelsang served as county judge for Christian County, Illinois. He was a Democrat. Vogelsang served in the Illinois Senate in 1933 and died while in office. He died in St. Vincent's Hospital in Taylorville, Illinois from complications from surgery for the removal of his appendix.
