= David A. Strother =

African American voting rights pioneer in Illinois

- Born: August 18, 1843; Missouri, U.S.
- Died: March 12, 1905 (aged 71); El Paso, Illinois, U.S.
- Occupations: Activist, community leader
- Known for: First African American to vote in El Paso, Illinois after the 15th Amendment

David A. Strother (August 18, 1843 – March 12, 1905) is historically significant for being the first African American man in the US state of Illinois to cast a vote following the passage of the Fifteenth Amendment to the United States Constitution in 1870. His brother, Charlie Strother, was the second African American to vote in the state. Born in Missouri to a free mother, Strother was later a riverboat worker and served in the Union Army during the American Civil War. After settling in El Paso, Illinois, in 1864, he became an influential member of the local African American community. His legacy is honored at the Project XV Museum in El Paso, which showcases the history of voting rights for African Americans and other marginalized groups.

== Early life and background ==
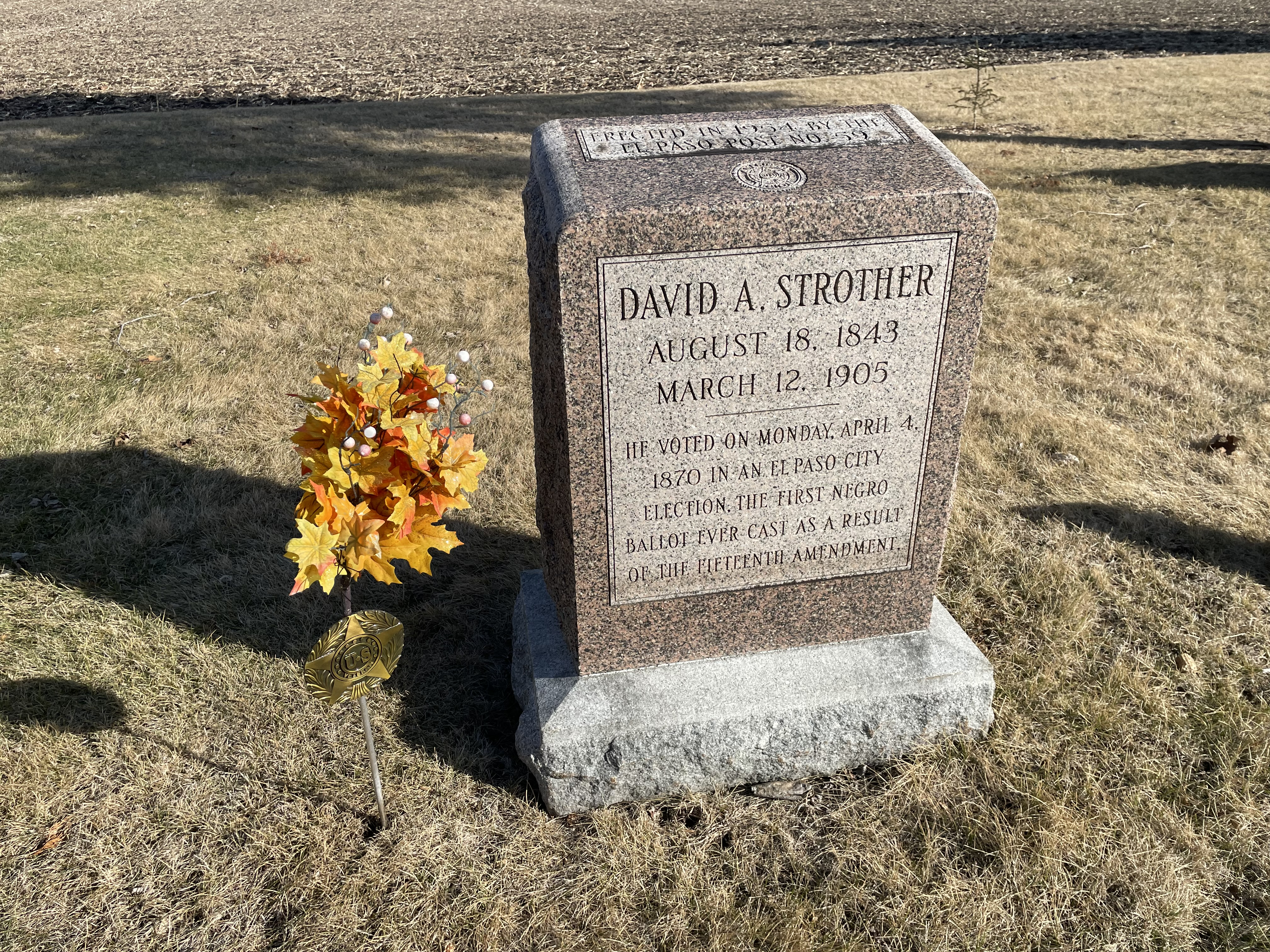
Grave of David A. Strother in the El Paso Township Evergreen Cemetery

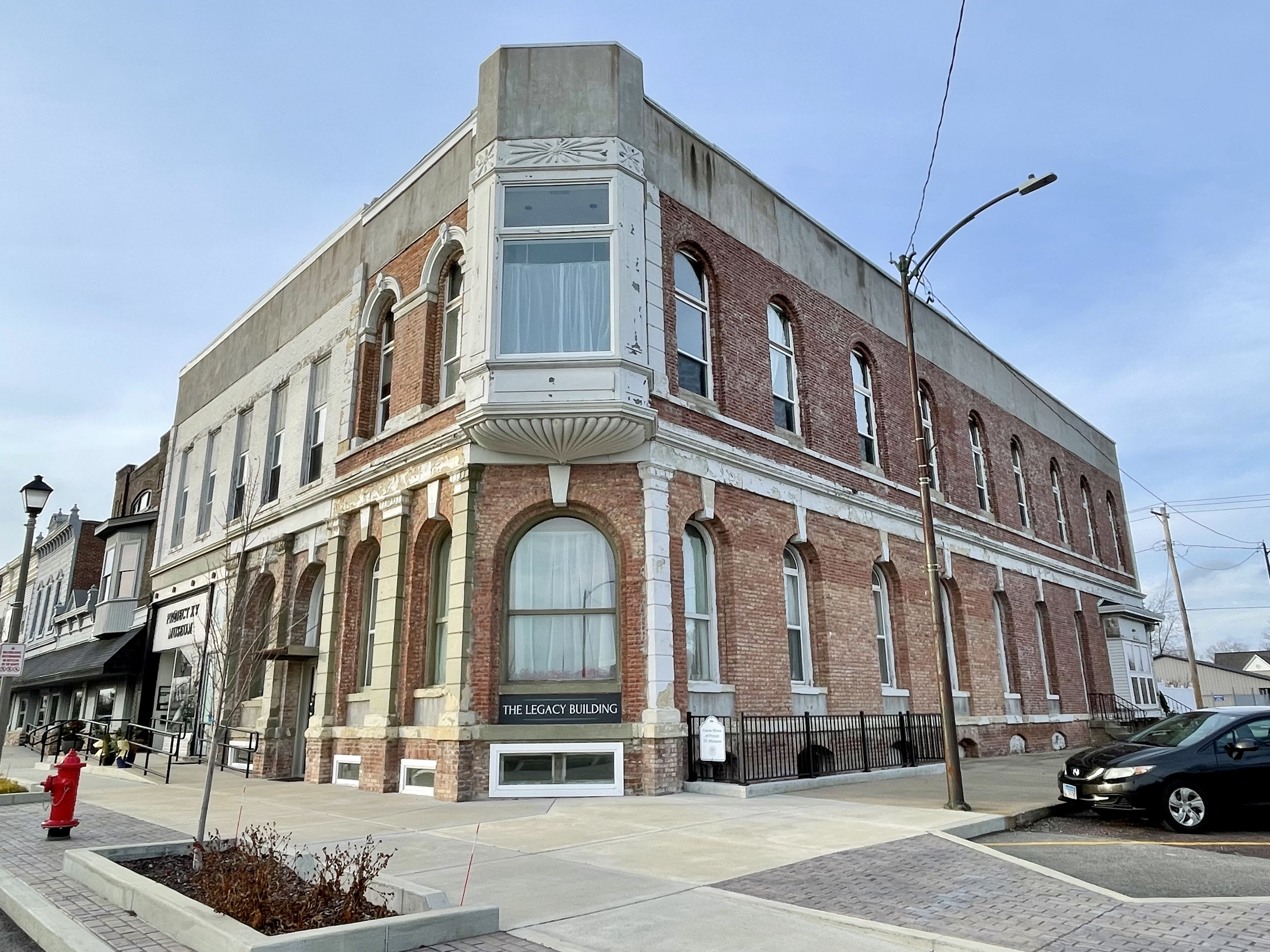
The Legacy Building and Project XV Museum

Strother was born on August 18, 1843, in Missouri. His mother purchased her freedom from slavery, and they later moved to Peoria, Illinois. Strother worked on riverboats and participated in the Union Army during the American Civil War, where he served as a cook for the 17th Illinois Infantry in Ulysses S. Grant's campaign at the Battle of Vicksburg. He was persuaded to settle in El Paso, Illinois, in 1864, where he eventually became a prominent community leader.

== Contributions to voting rights ==
Strother is historically recognized as the first African American to vote in Illinois after the ratification of the 15th Amendment. His act of voting is part of the broader story of African American suffrage during the Reconstruction Era. His brother, Charlie Strother, cast his vote shortly after David. Additionally, the town of El Paso, Illinois, claims a notable historical place in the movement for African American voting rights, with the Strother brothers marking an important milestone in its history. As reported by Pantagraph, El Paso proudly claims these early African American voters as part of its local history.

== Legacy ==
Strother's legacy as a civil rights pioneer is commemorated at the Project XV Museum in El Paso, Illinois. The museum, established in 2019, highlights Strother's role in the struggle for voting rights and provides a space to educate the public on the history of voting in the United States. It features Strother's restored barber shop, interactive exhibits, and artifacts related to voting rights. It is in an 1874 building that was originally home to the barber shop run by the Strother brothers and also housed El Paso’s first library room, telephone company, bank, City Hall and an opera house.

== Recognition ==
In 2020, Illinois legislators recognized Strother's contributions to voting rights with a resolution that enshrined his place in the state's political history. His legacy is an important part of both local and national history, and continues to inspire efforts to expand civil rights and voting access for marginalized groups. Strother's legacy is also honored through various commemorative sources, including genealogy websites. In 2023, Illinois designated April 4 as David Strother Day.
