= Frederick Grant Gleason =

American composer

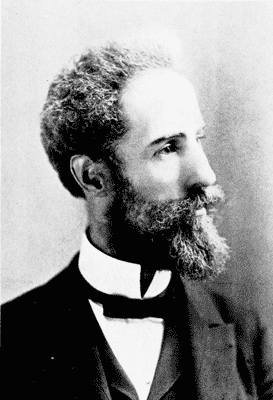
Portrait of Frederick Grant Gleason

Frederick Grant Gleason (born 17 December 1848 in Middletown, Connecticut - died Chicago, 6 December 1903) was an American composer, and director of the Chicago Conservatory from 1900 to 1903.

Gleason's father was a banker. Like many other well-to-do gentlemen, Gleason senior was an amateur flautist. He considered music a pleasant pastime but not a serious occupation. He wanted his son to enter the ministry - a good old New England tradition. But the son insisted on becoming a composer, and the father yielded. Gleason spent much of his early life in the neighboring city of Hartford, as a pupil of Dudley Buck, going in 1869 to Leipzig to study with Ignaz Moscheles and Hans Richter. After six years in Europe he returned to America, and in 1877 went to Chicago as a member of the faculty of the Hershey School of Music, of which Clarence Eddy (also a pupil of Buck) was the general director. Gleason was also active as a music critic. In 1897 he became president of an organization called the 'American Patriotic Musical League'. He was general director of the Chicago Conservatory from 1900 to 1903. His students included composer Elsa Swartz. According to Philo A. Otis, Gleason "was an idealist, a dreamer, though too much of a follower to be a leader."

Gleason's compositions include: the Festival Ode (words by Harriet Monroe) sung by 500 voices with orchestra at the opening of the Auditorium Theatre, Chicago on 9 December 1889; Processional of the Holy Grail written for the Chicago World's Fair; a symphonic poem, Edris, based on a novel by Marie Corelli; the tone poem Song of Life (after a poem by Swinburne); a Piano Concerto; a cantata with orchestra, The Culprit Fay; and two operas: Otho Visconti and Montezuma. The former was produced at Chicago in 1907. He left other scores in manuscript, with instructions that they were not to be publicly performed until fifty years after his death.
