= Elsa Swartz =

American composer and music educator

Elsa Elene Swartz (June 25, 1874 - August 6, 1948) was an American composer and music educator.

Swartz was born in El Paso, Illinois, to Barbara Elizabeth Keller and Joseph Beery Swartz. She had four brothers and three sisters. Swartz received a diploma from the Wesleyan Conservatory (today Illinois Wesleyan University) and also studied music in Chicago. Her teachers included Gertrude H Murdough, Almon Kincaid Virgil, M. Jennette London, and Frederic Grant Gleason.

Swartz taught at the Wesleyan Conservatory for over a decade. She composed several pieces for children, which were published by Clayton F. Summy.
