= El Paso, Illinois =

- City
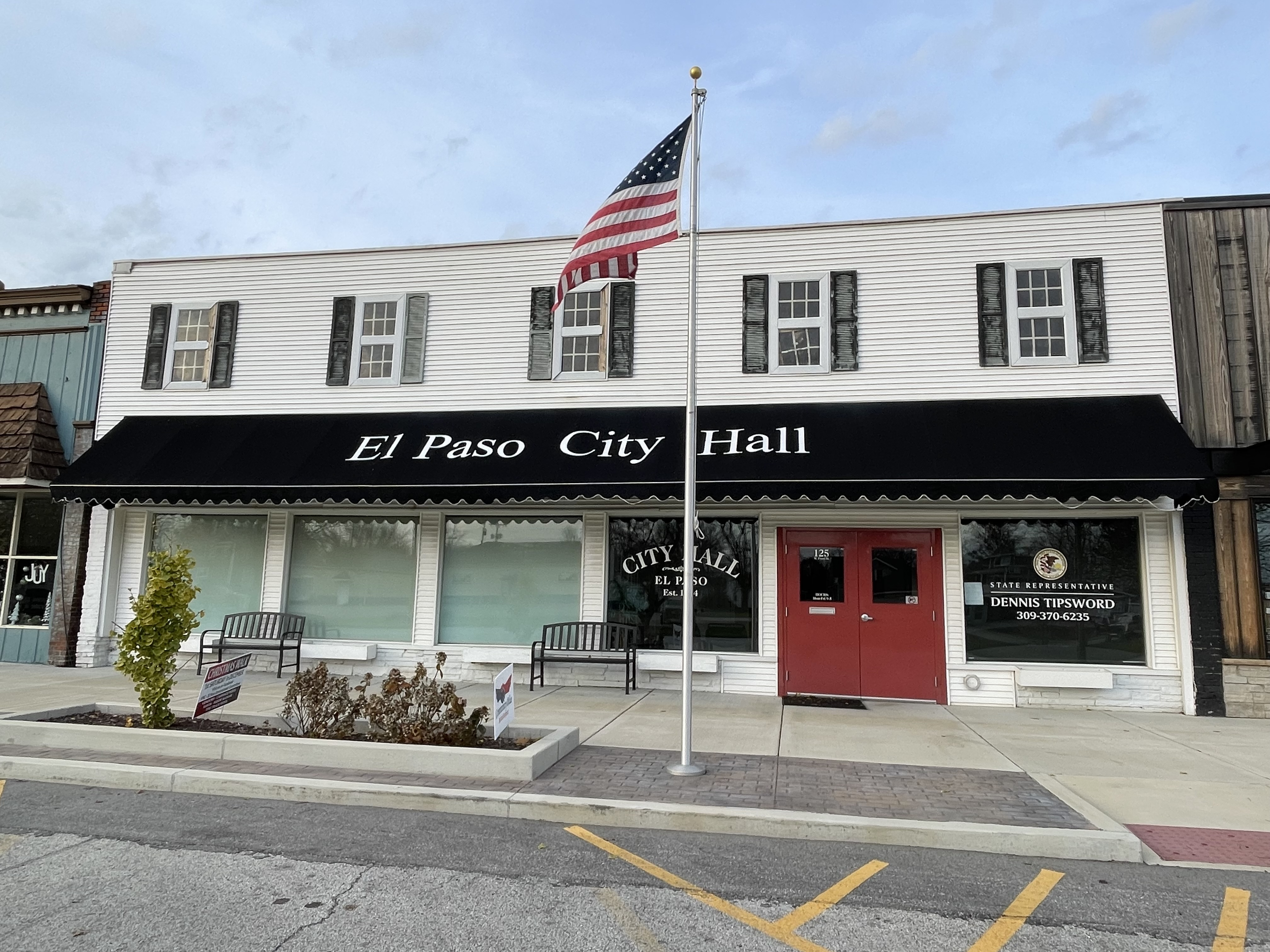
- City hall
- Motto: Building for tomorrow
- Location in Woodford County, Illinois
- Coordinates: 40°44′26″N 89°01′06″W
- Country: United States
- State: Illinois
- Counties: Woodford, McLean
- Townships: El Paso, Gridley
- Established: 1857
- Founder: George Gibson and James Wathen
- Named for: Uncertain; likely El Paso Mountains or El Paso County, Texas

Government
  - Mayor: Thad Mool

Area
  - Total: 2.15 sq mi (5.56 km^{2})
  - Land: 2.15 sq mi (5.56 km^{2})
  - Water: 0 sq mi (0.00 km^{2})
- Elevation: 748 ft (228 m)

Population (2020)
  - Total: 2,756
  - Estimate (2024): 2,732
  - Density: 1,284.7/sq mi (496.04/km^{2})
- Time zone: UTC-6 (CST)
  - Summer (DST): UTC-5 (CDT)
- ZIP code: 61738
- Area code: 309
- FIPS code: 17-23737
- FIPS code: 17-23737
- GNIS ID: 2394632
- Website: www.elpasoil.org

El Paso (Spanish for 'The Step') is a city in Woodford and McLean counties in the U.S. state of Illinois. The population was 2,756 at the 2020 census. The Woodford County portion of El Paso is part of the Peoria metropolitan area.

El Paso is a city in central Illinois. After the construction of Interstate 39, which replaced the former alignment of U.S. Highway 51 through the area, the city’s development patterns shifted toward highway-oriented transportation infrastructure. Interstate 39 in Illinois was completed on October 31, 1992, with the final segment between Kappa and Illinois Route 116 near El Paso. The city's strategic location at the intersection of the Illinois Central Railroad and the Toledo, Peoria, and Western Railroad played a pivotal role in its development as a vital commercial hub in the 19th century.

In February 2022, a multi-vehicle collision on Interstate 39 near El Paso resulted in an extended highway closure reported in national media.

El Paso is also home to the El Paso District Library, a Carnegie library built in 1907, and the Legacy Building, originally constructed in 1874 as the Eagle Block Building, which now houses several local businesses and the Project XV Museum.

Historical transportation links and local developments have shaped El Paso’s growth and community institutions over time.

== History ==
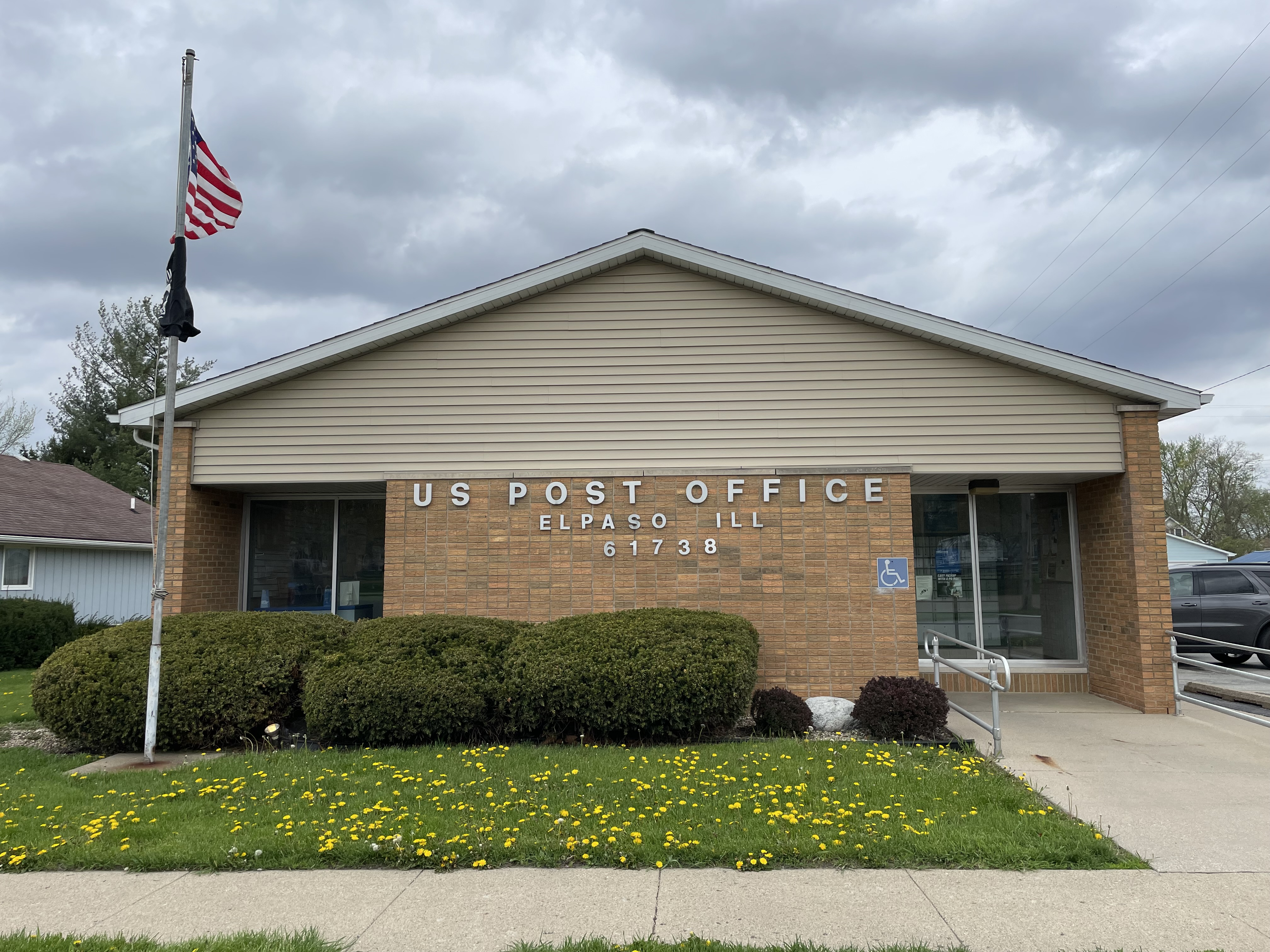
El Paso, Illinois Post Office

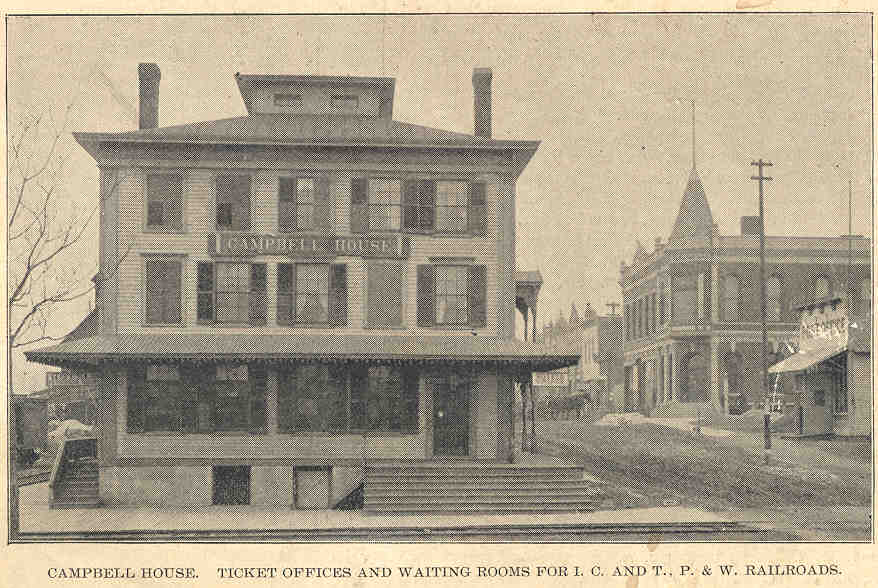
The Campbell House, 1896

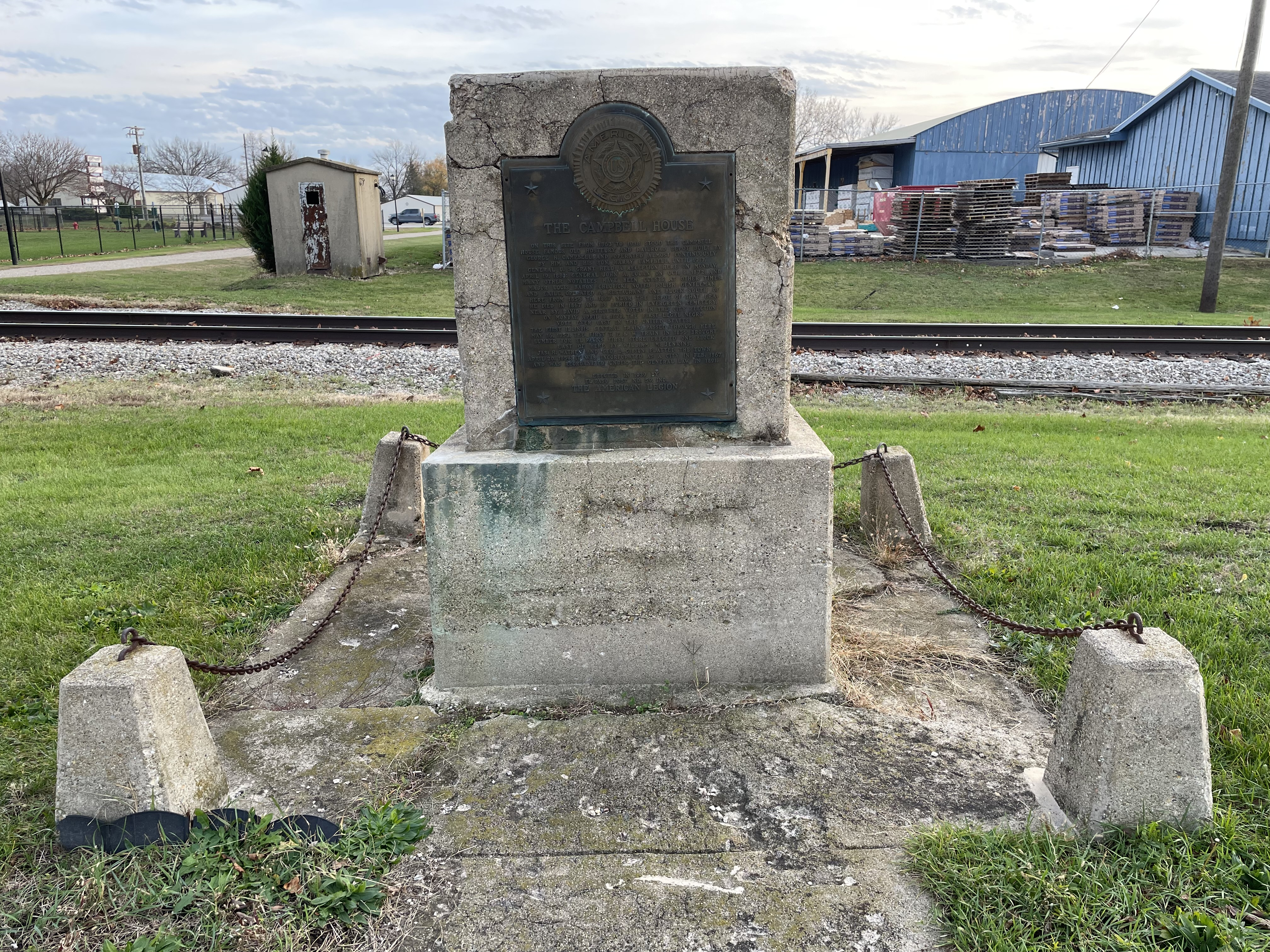
The Campbell House Memorial

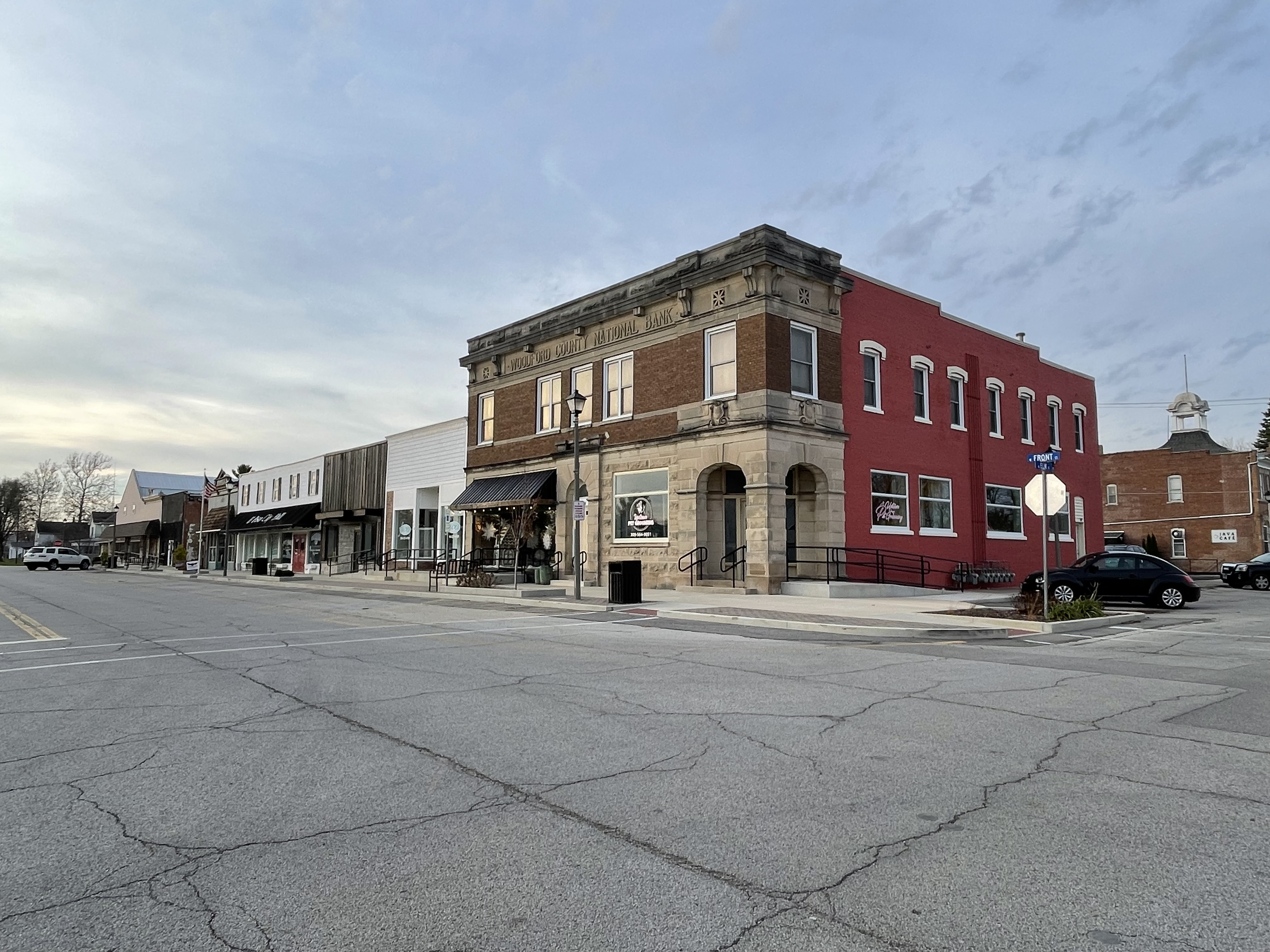
West Block of Front St

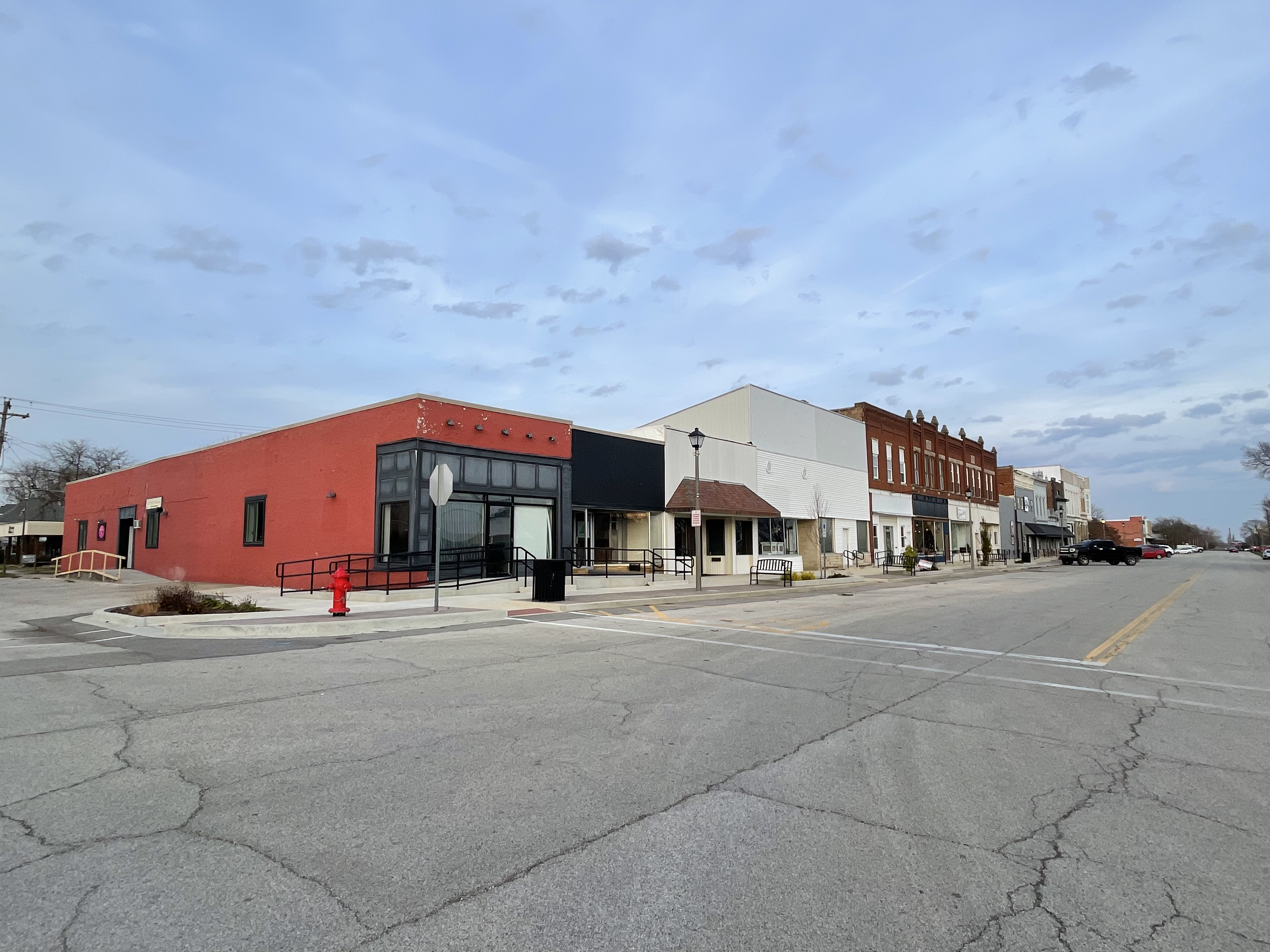
East Block of Front St

El Paso was founded by George Gibson and James Wathen. Having traveled to California through Texas previously, Gibson gave it the Spanish name El Paso, either after El Paso County, Texas, the El Paso Mountains in California, or because of a nearby railroad junction.

The city developed at the intersection of the Illinois Central Railroad and the Toledo, Peoria, and Western Railroad. This junction contributed to the expansion of local commerce through the late 19th century. In 1857, the Peoria & Oquawka Railroad was built, linking Gilman on the Chicago branch to El Paso on the main line, thereby establishing a connection between these two significant divisions, and, on December 3, 1871, the Oilman, Clinton & Springfield Railroad, which connected the branch to the state capital, officially began operations. The Illinois Central Railroad, in particular, attracted numerous businesses and settlers, spurring economic growth and connecting the town to larger cities. This connection laid the foundation for El Paso's continued expansion into the late 1800s, fueling business and social activity.

In 1867, El Paso tried unsuccessfully to become the county seat of Woodford County by offering $30,000 to Metamora to relinquish the title. A closely contested vote initially favored El Paso, but a recount reversed the decision by a margin of ten votes. Several towns, including Eureka, El Paso, and Roanoke vied for the county seat over the years. Not until 1894 did Eureka successfully become the county seat. During this period, El Paso's growing commercial center was supported by businesses along its newly paved Front Street.

The first post office in El Paso Township was established by Caleb Horn at his house, about two to three miles from Kappa, with mail carried by horseback twice a week. The first store in the township opened in Kappa around the time the Illinois Central Railroad passed through the area, and the first mill in El Paso was built by Ives. The Horn post office, called Roxan, moved to Kappa in 1853, and William M. Jenkins became the first postmaster of El Paso in 1857. Over the years, the post office moved several times, with key changes including the relocation to Elm Street in 1861, the transfer to the Shur, Tompkins & Co. Bank building in the 1860s, and finally, the move to its current location in 1901. By the mid-1900s, multiple rural mail routes had been established, and in 1964, a new post office building was opened.

The Campbell House in El Paso, Illinois, was built in 1854 by William Campbell, an early settler and prominent local figure, and it served as an important stagecoach stop along the Peoria and Bloomington Road. The building was razed in 1938. The house was later preserved as a historic landmark. A memorial on the property honors the Campbell family's contributions to El Paso's history.

In 1869, El Paso was depicted in a map entitled "Map of El Paso, Woodford County, Illinois" by Albert Ruger, which provided a detailed panoramic view of the town, showcasing its early infrastructure, including streets, buildings, and notable landmarks such as religious institutions. This map offers a snapshot of El Paso as a growing community with a bustling railroad intersection at its core. By the late 19th century, Front Street had become the central hub of El Paso's business district, reflecting the town's growth alongside the railroad. A major reconstruction effort in 1894 transformed the street with the addition of brick-paved roads and new commercial buildings, solidifying its status as a bustling center of commerce. In addition to commercial activities, the Eagle Block Building, constructed in 1874, became a key social center, housing various businesses, a library, and even the city's opera house. A revitalization of the sidewalks on Front Street occurred in 2022.

Education played a crucial role in El Paso's development. By 1878, Panola Township had ten school districts—Panola, Hilsabeck, Shaw, Pauley, De Vries, McOmber, Hodgson, Bassett, Roth, and Punke—with a total of 480 students, demonstrating the community's early commitment to education. In late 1856, Handley King built a home at First and Pine streets, where his aunt taught the first school with 20 pupils, and later, Jennie Fishburn and Harry H. Hewitt became key figures in the community's growing educational efforts, which led to the addition of classrooms due to overcrowding. El Paso's school district initially encompassed the entire village and most of the northern half of El Paso Township, but a rivalry between east and west side businessmen led to the division of the district in 1869, with two separate schools established. The East Side school, built in 1869, and the West Side school, initially a wooden structure replaced by a brick building in 1897, operated independently until 1944, when a popular vote consolidated the districts into one unified grade school district. Despite this rivalry, educational advancements were made, including the introduction of a four-year high school program in 1892 and the creation of El Paso Township High School District #375 in 1916, culminating in the construction of a new high school building in 1921.

== Geography ==
El Paso is located in southeastern Woodford County. A small portion of the city limits extends east along U.S. Route 24 into northern McLean County. US 24 leads east 15 miles (24 km) to Interstate 55 in Chenoa and west 32 miles (51 km) to Peoria. Interstate 39 crosses the west side of El Paso, with access from Exit 14 (US 24); the Interstate highway leads south 14 miles (23 km) to Interstate 55 in Normal and north 45 miles (72 km) to La Salle. Illinois Route 251 follows the former alignment of U.S. Route 51 through the center of El Paso, leading north 11 miles (18 km) to Minonk and south 5 miles (8.0 km) to Kappa.

According to the U.S. Census Bureau, El Paso has a total area of 2.15 square miles (5.57 km^{2}), all land. The city sits on high ground that drains north to the East Branch of Panther Creek and south to the headwaters of Wolf Creek. Both creek systems are south-flowing tributaries of the Mackinaw River and part of the Illinois River watershed.

El Paso experiences a humid continental climate, characterized by warm, humid summers and cold, snowy winters. Average high temperatures in July reach around 85.6 °F, while January sees average lows near 15 °F. The city receives approximately 35 inches of rainfall annually, with the majority occurring between April and October, and about 13 inches of snowfall each year. The city's elevation is approximately 499 feet above sea level.

El Paso's geographic location places it within the Peoria Metropolitan Statistical Area.

== Demographics ==
Historical population
Census	Pop.	Note	%±
1860	890		—
1870	1,564		75.7%
1880	1,390		−11.1%
1890	1,353		−2.7%
1900	1,441		6.5%
1910	1,470		2.0%
1920	1,638		11.4%
1930	1,578		−3.7%
1940	1,621		2.7%
1950	1,818		12.2%
1960	1,964		8.0%
1970	2,291		16.6%
1980	2,676		16.8%
1990	2,499		−6.6%
2000	2,695		7.8%
2010	2,810		4.3%
2020	2,756		−1.9%
U.S. Decennial Census

=== 2020 census ===
As of the 2020 census, El Paso had a population of 2,756. The median age was 39.1 years. 25.2% of residents were under the age of 18 and 16.9% of residents were 65 years of age or older. For every 100 females there were 91.1 males, and for every 100 females age 18 and over there were 90.5 males age 18 and over.

0.0% of residents lived in urban areas, while 100.0% lived in rural areas.

There were 1,068 households in El Paso, of which 32.4% had children under the age of 18 living in them. Of all households, 48.3% were married-couple households, 17.1% were households with a male householder and no spouse or partner present, and 27.2% were households with a female householder and no spouse or partner present. About 30.1% of all households were made up of individuals and 13.6% had someone living alone who was 65 years of age or older.

There were 1,160 housing units, of which 7.9% were vacant. The homeowner vacancy rate was 2.6% and the rental vacancy rate was 11.0%.

Racial composition as of the 2020 census
Race	Number	Percent
White	2,551	92.6%
Black or African American	46	1.7%
American Indian and Alaska Native	2	0.1%
Asian	10	0.4%
Native Hawaiian and Other Pacific Islander	0	0.0%
Some other race	21	0.8%
Two or more races	126	4.6%
Hispanic or Latino (of any race)	57	2.1%

=== Income and poverty ===
Income data revealed that the median household income in El Paso was $70,063, while the average household income was $78,267. Approximately 4.7% of families were living below the poverty line.

=== Demographic estimates ===
El Paso encompasses a total land area of 2.1 square miles, resulting in a population density of approximately 1,272.10 residents per square mile. The population is distributed across various age groups, with 9% under 10 years, 16% aged 10–17, 13% aged 18–24, 11% aged 25–34, 14% aged 35–44, 9% aged 45–54, 13% aged 55–64, and 15% aged 65 and older. The majority of residents are U.S.-born citizens, accounting for 96.88% of the population.

== Education ==
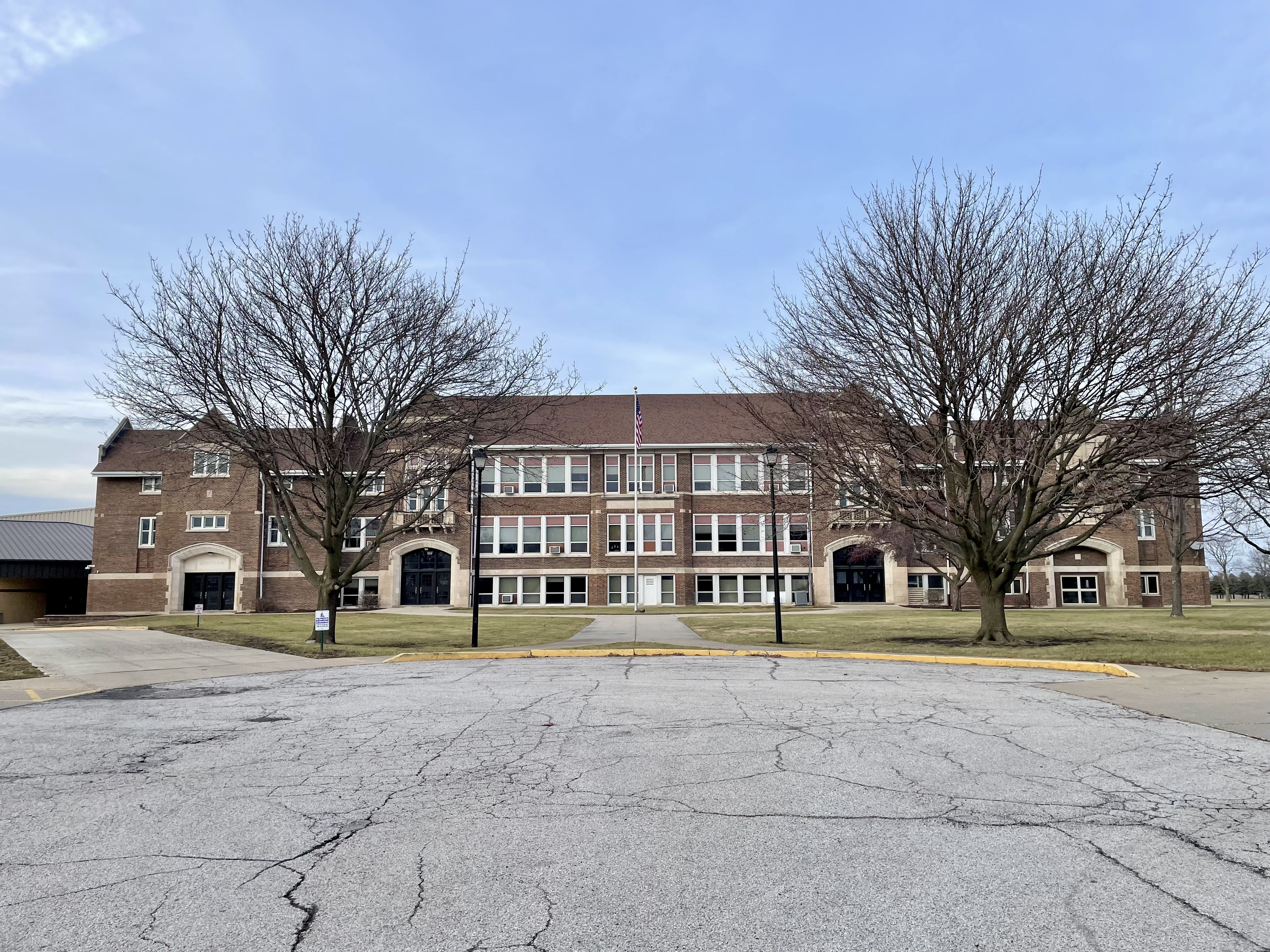
El Paso Gridley High School

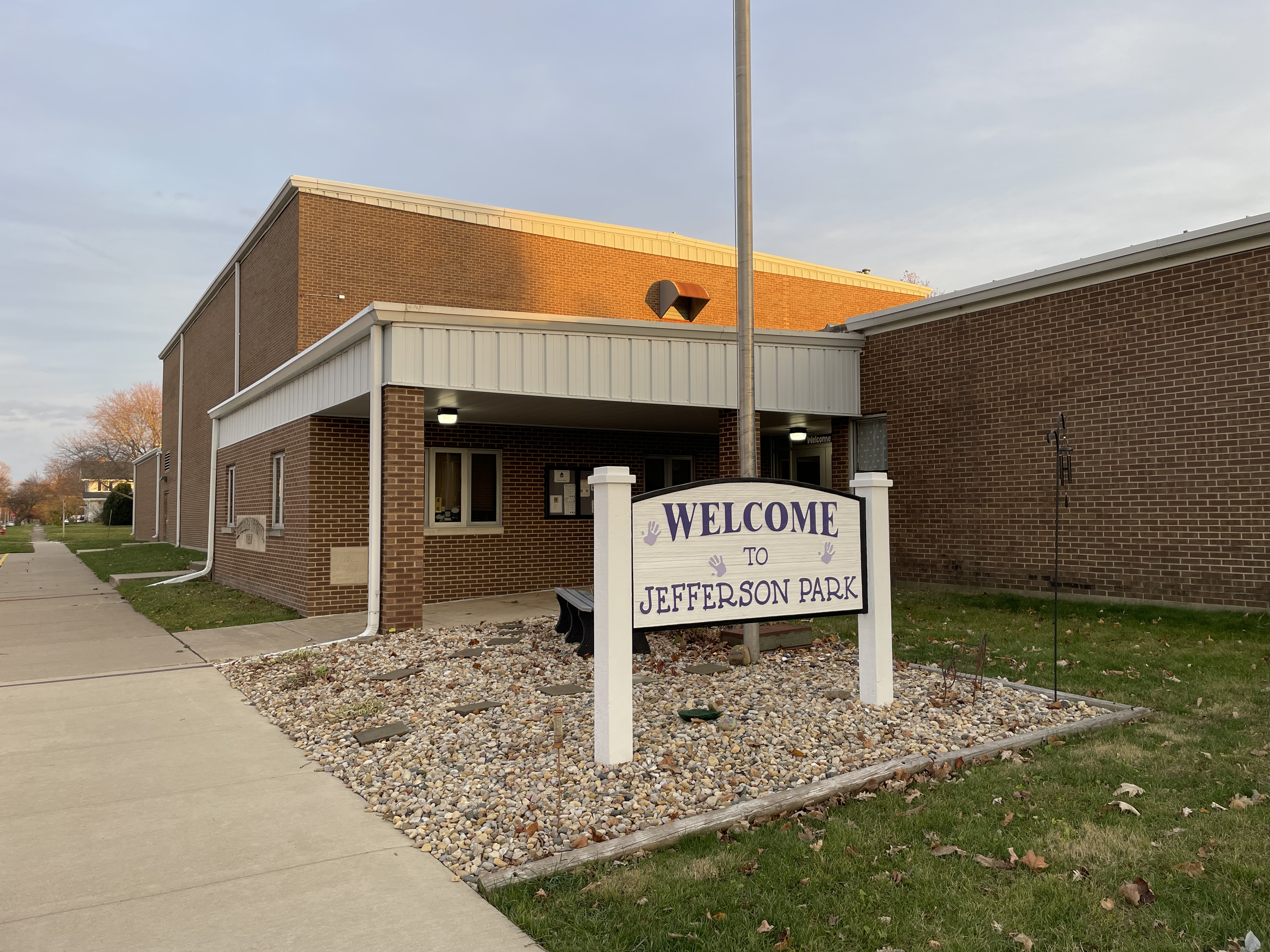
Jefferson Park Elementary School

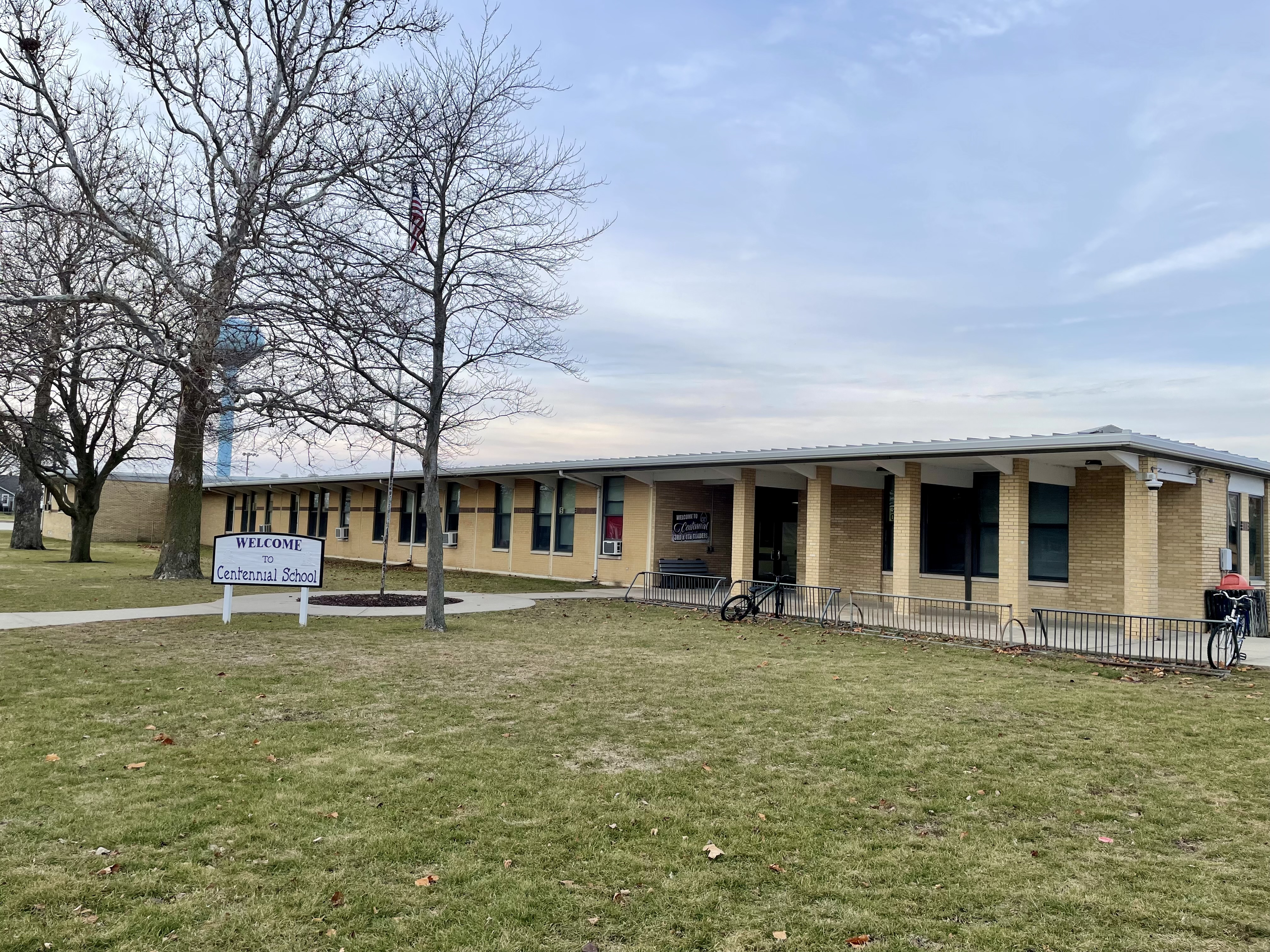
Centennial School

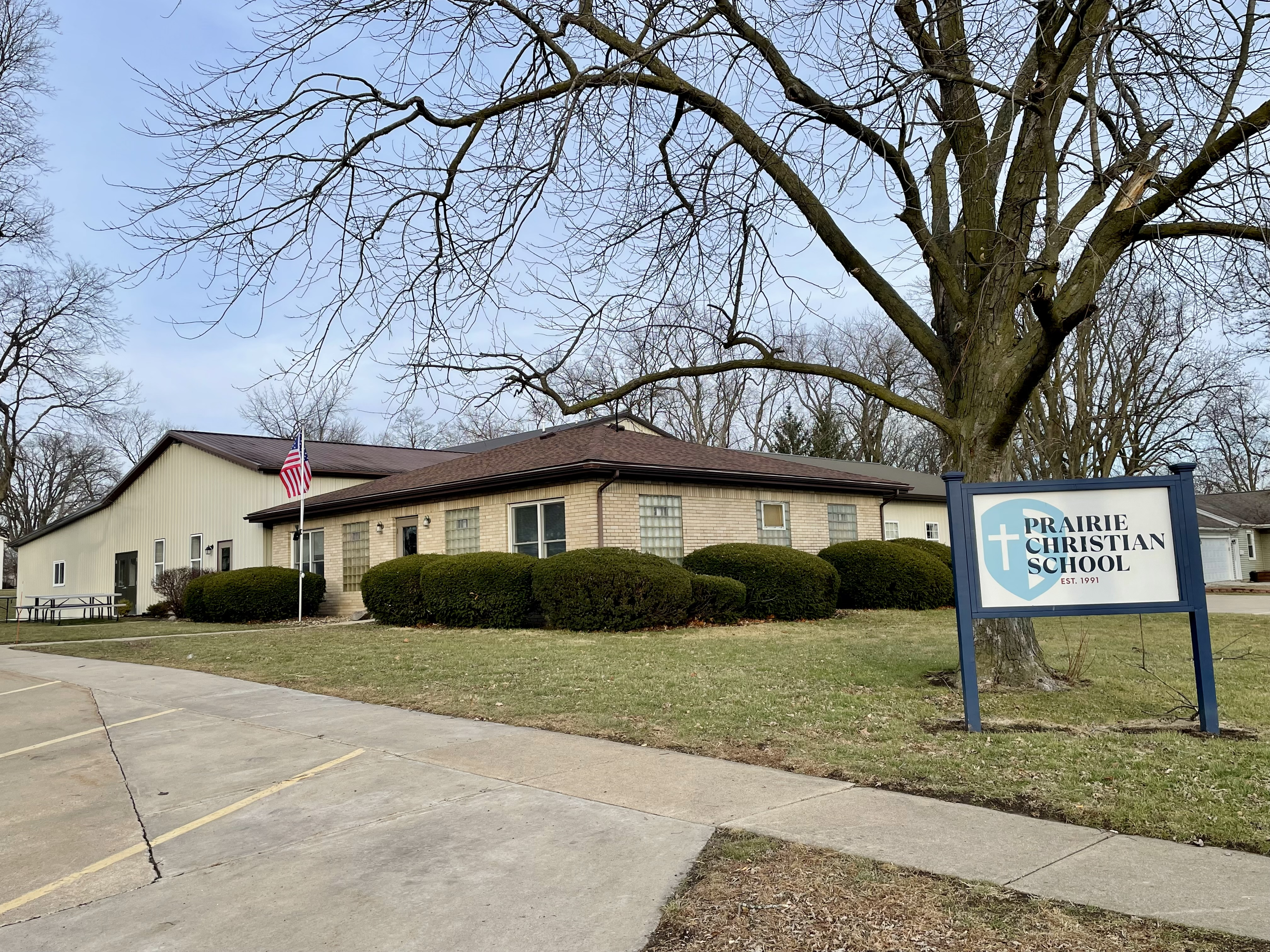
Prairie Christian School

El Paso's school district, El Paso-Gridley Community Unit School District 11 (CUSD #11), is the product of a consolidation with the school district of Gridley, IL. CUSD #11's schools are split between El Paso and Gridley:

- El Paso Gridley High School - Housing all of the high school students for the district
- El Paso Gridley Junior High School - Housing all of the upper and lower levels of junior high (grades 5, 6, 7, and 8) students for the district
- Centennial School - Housing all the grade 3 and 4 elementary students of the district
- Jefferson Park - Housing all the preschool, kindergarten, and grade 1 and 2 elementary students of the district

The educational landscape of El Paso, Illinois, has evolved significantly since the mid-19th century. In 1850, Reverend Abner Peeler taught the first school in Kansas Township near Zachariah Brown's cabin. By 1857, the town of El Paso had constructed its first schoolhouse, where Henry Hewitt served as the inaugural teacher.

By 1859, the Illinois Central Railroad tracks divided the city into East and West sides, prompting the establishment of two rival school districts. The East Side school, constructed in 1869 and completed in 1870, was later named McKinley School after President William McKinley's assassination in 1901.

Both schools initially offered two-year high school programs, with the East Side school graduating its first student, Julia Toussieng, in 1874. By 1893, both schools had expanded their curricula to include four-year high school courses. In 1910, the high school programs were consolidated at Jefferson Park, though the grade schools remained separate until 1944.

El Paso Township High School District #375 was established in 1916 following voter approval, despite legal challenges that reached the Illinois Supreme Court. A new brick high school was constructed in 1921, featuring modern amenities such as an auditorium and gymnasium.

In 1948, El Paso Community Unit District #375 was formed, unifying the high school and grade school districts. The district expanded to include outlying areas such as Secor and the Mackinaw River region near Carlock. Rural schools, including many one-room schoolhouses, were consolidated, and students were transported by bus to centralized schools in El Paso.

By March 2004, voters approved the merger of El Paso Unit #375 with Gridley Unit #10, creating El Paso-Gridley Community Unit School District 11. This new district began operation on July 1, 2004, with the high school located in El Paso and the junior high in Gridley. Today, the district serves students across Woodford, McLean, and Livingston counties.

Prairie Christian School located in El Paso was established in 1991 to provide a Christ-centered learning environment with high academic standards for students from kindergarten through eighth grade. The inaugural school year began with 10 students and two teachers, utilizing the original brick portion of the school building. Over the years, the school has expanded its facilities, including the addition of a gymnasium in 2002, to accommodate a growing student body and enhance educational offerings.

Homeschooling families in El Paso have access to various resources and support networks. The El Paso District Library offers information on state requirements and connections to homeschooling groups. The library also hosts homeschool events.

== Culture ==
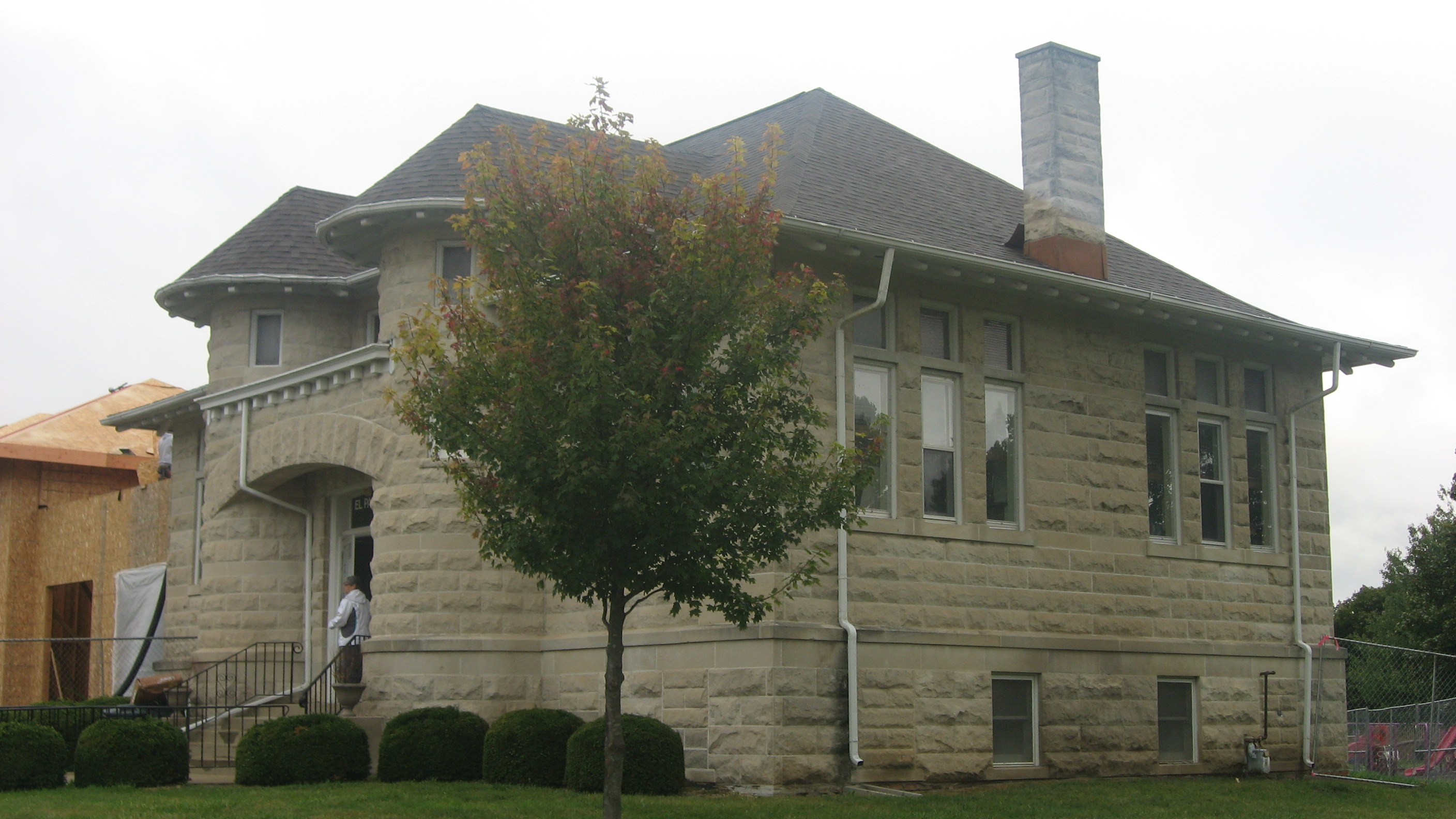
El Paso Public Library

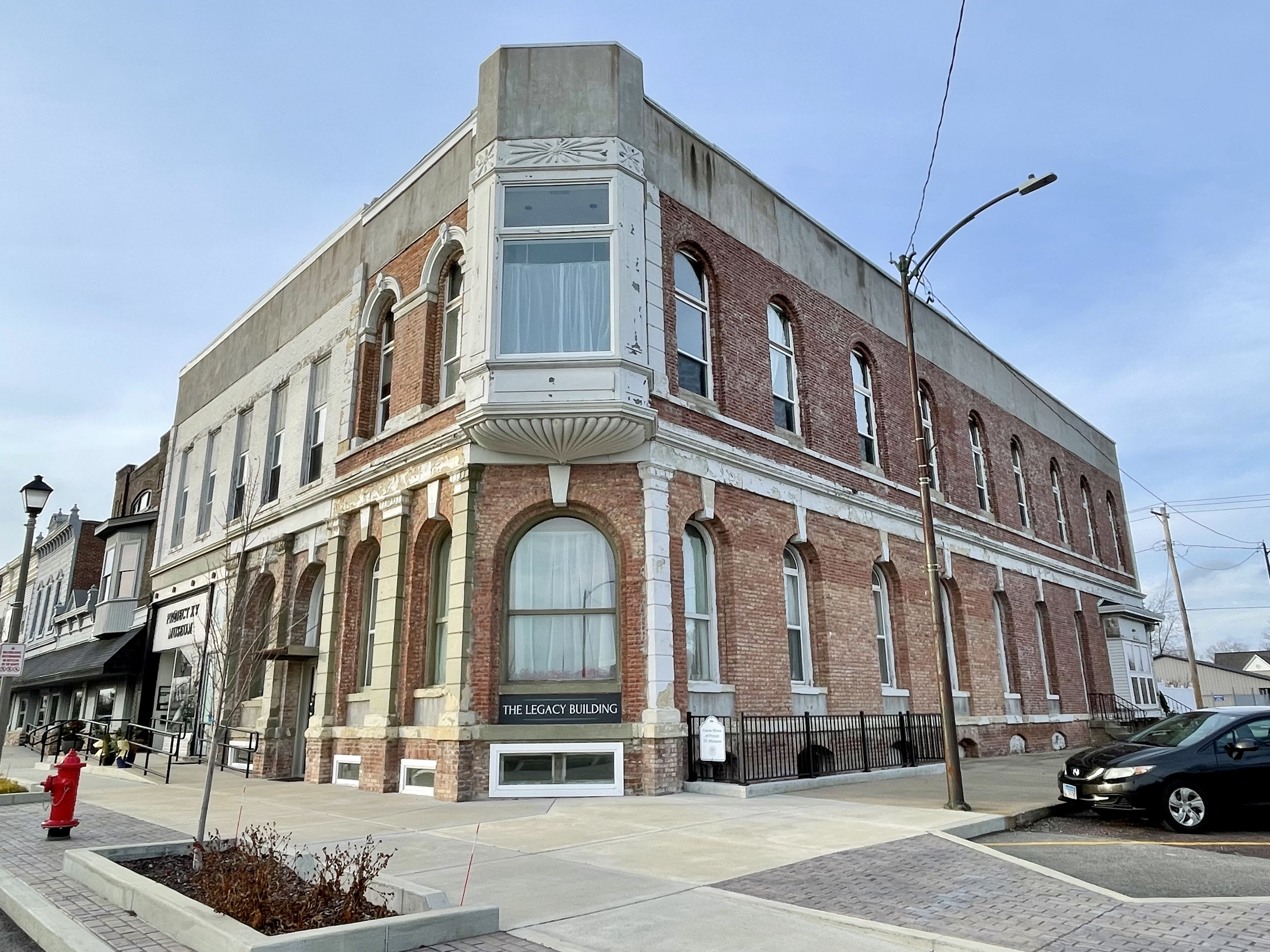
The Legacy Building

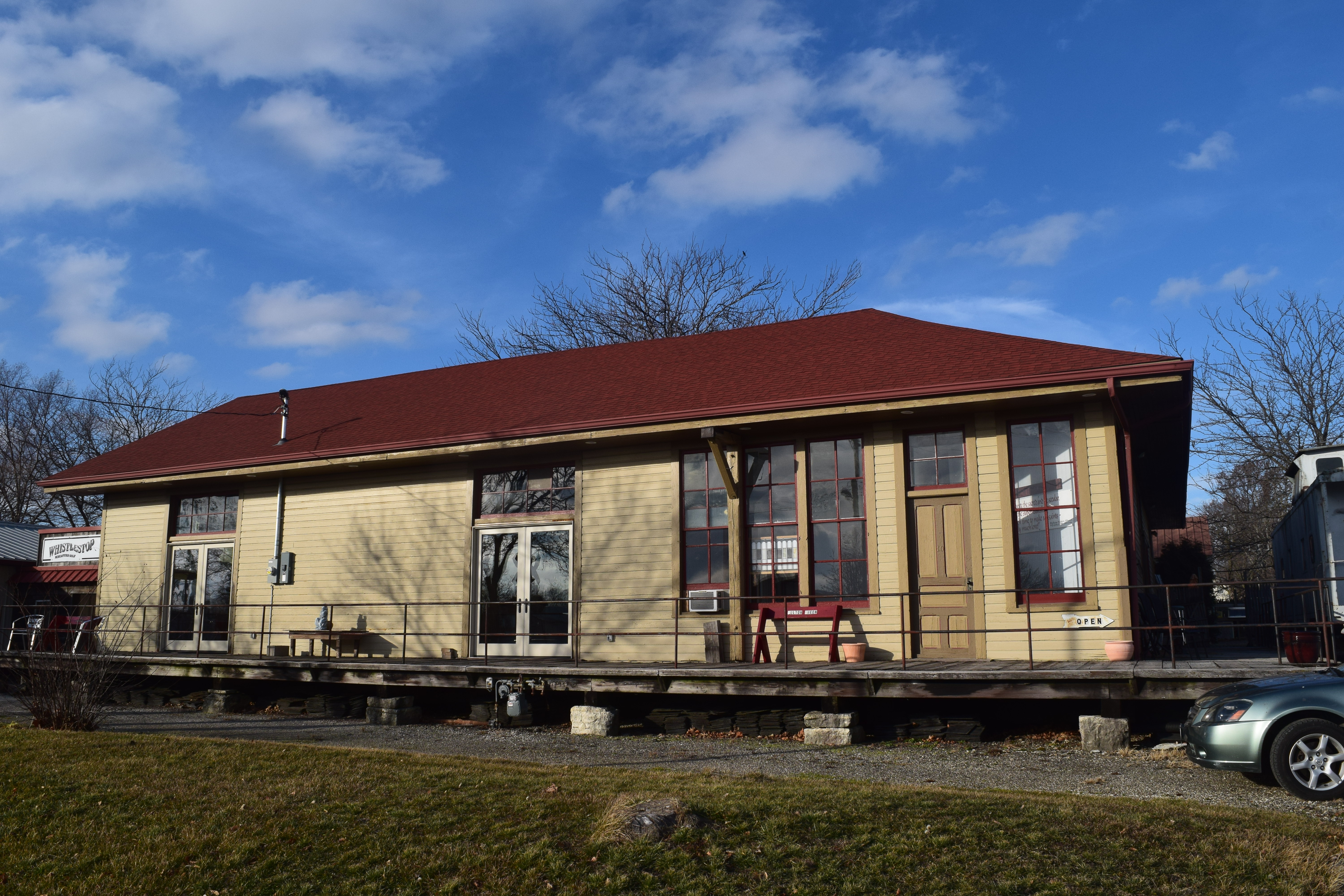
Illinois Central Railroad and Toledo, Peoria, and Western Railroad Freight House

=== Attractions ===
- El Paso Public Library, a Carnegie library built in 1907
- Archbishop Fulton John Sheen Spiritual Centre
- The Legacy Building and Project XV Museum
- Illinois Central Railroad and Toledo, Peoria, and Western Railroad Freight House
- El Paso Golf Club

==== El Paso District Library ====
The El Paso District Library, established with a Carnegie grant in 1907, has operated continuously as a public library. It offers reading materials, programs, and resources for local residents. In 1906, their efforts culminated in securing a grant from philanthropist Andrew Carnegie, leading to the construction of a two-story library building.

The library has served the community for over a century, situated in Jefferson Park, located near the elementary, middle, and high schools.

In 2010, the library began exploring the possibility of expanding its facilities to accommodate increased usage, a growing collection, and to provide greater accessibility. Fundraising efforts took place through 2012 and 2013, leading to the commencement of construction in 2013. The expanded library opened its doors on May 3, 2014, celebrated by hundreds of community members. This expansion was completed solely with grants and donations from the community.

The addition brought several improvements, including full accessibility, increased space for books and accessories, improved areas for public computers and technology, separate meeting spaces for library and community programs, quiet study rooms, and dedicated areas for the storage and display of El Paso's history. Notable rooms include the Edward and Marjory Heiken Children's Room, the Lester Pfister History and Genealogy Room, and the Drake Family-Heartland Bank Community Room.

==== The Legacy Building and Project XV Museum ====
The Legacy Building, located at 1 West Front Street in El Paso, Illinois, was originally constructed in 1874 as the Eagle Block Building. This historic structure has served various purposes over the years, including housing the American Dairy Association, the First National Bank, and the city's opera house. In 1894, a devastating fire destroyed much of Front Street, including the original building. However, the vault of the First National Bank survived the blaze, allowing for the reconstruction of the building, which was completed in 1895.

Today, the Legacy Building houses several local businesses, such as Can Do Kids International, Heirloom Photography, The Legacy Opera House, and Virginia Lee's home decorating business. The building also features a restored opera house that accommodates up to 200 guests, making it a popular venue for weddings and special events.

The Project XV Museum documents the history of voting rights in the United States, including exhibits on significant local figures and events associated with the 15th Amendment. The museum is named after the 15th Amendment, which granted African American men the right to vote. A significant exhibit focuses on David A. Strother, a local barber who, in 1870, became the first African American to vote in Illinois after the passage of the 15th Amendment. The museum aims to educate and empower communities by shedding light on the rich history of voting rights.

==== Illinois Central Railroad and Toledo, Peoria, and Western Railroad Freight House ====
The Illinois Central Railroad and Toledo, Peoria, and Western Railroad Freight House, located at 8-10 East Front Street in El Paso and known as "The Depot" by locals, was a key transportation hub in the region, serving both railroads. El Paso was founded in the 1850s by landowners who successfully competed to secure the site of the crossing of these two major rail lines, marking a turning point in the city's development. The depot, initially constructed in 1889-90 following the destruction of the original building, played a vital role in shipping agricultural products from the surrounding area and in supporting the local economy by facilitating the movement of goods. The depot remained operational for many years, becoming a cornerstone of the city's economic activity until rail transport began to decline in the 1930s, ceasing entirely by the 1960s. Despite the decline, it stood as the longest-surviving structure associated with both railroads until its eventual demolition and relocation.

The freight depot's historical significance was formally recognized when it was listed on the National Register of Historic Places on August 16, 1994. Though it was relocated to 17 East Main Street in El Paso, it retains its status on the register, preserving the memory of its contributions to the city's development. The depot, once a bustling point of activity, symbolizes the important role that railroads played in the economic life of the American Midwest during the late 19th and early 20th centuries.

In 2000, the building found a new purpose when it became the Archbishop Fulton John Sheen Spiritual Centre. Archbishop Sheen, born in El Paso in 1895, was a prominent Catholic figure, known for his popular television programs and his impactful work as a bishop. The center showcases exhibits dedicated to his life and legacy, including personal items such as his 1953 Emmy Award, along with magazines, photographs, and videos of his work. The center is dedicated to preserving his memory and providing an educational experience about Sheen's contributions to the Church and media.

== Parks ==
El Paso maintains multiple public parks that provide recreational opportunities and green spaces for residents and visitors alike. These parks serve as hubs for community activities, outdoor leisure, and cultural events, reflecting the city's dedication to enhancing quality of life. With features ranging from historic bandstands to modern playgrounds, the parks offer a blend of history, charm, and contemporary amenities.

=== Jefferson Park ===
Established on May 26, 1857, Jefferson Park, one of El Paso's original parks, was donated by Wathen during the city's platting. Enclosed with an iron fence in 1877 to protect it from wandering cattle, the park also featured a bandstand that became a focal point for community events and summer concerts. The Kiwanis Bi-centennial Memorial was built in 1976 by the Kiwanis Club of El Paso as part of the celebration of the United States' bicentennial to honor this milestone and commemorate the community's involvement in the celebration. The Kiwanis also added a picnic shelter to the west of the memorial in 1997 followed by a second shelter to the south of the first. The park currently offers a children's playground, picnic tables, shelter, and an outdoor stage. The block on which the park resides is also home to the El Paso District Library, which occupies the southern triangle of the block. Jefferson Park is known colloquially as Library Park by locals.

=== Franklin Park ===
Also established on May 26, 1857, Franklin Park, donated by the Gibson family, is another of the city's original parks. Similar to Jefferson Park, Franklin Park was enclosed by an iron fence in 1877 and later improved with diagonal walking paths in 1912. During the 1914 community improvement effort, 536 wagonloads of dirt were added to raise the park's grade. Over time, additional features such as drinking fountains, playground equipment, and flower beds were incorporated. An iconic slide in the shape of an elephant was added to the playground area in 1962 through fundraising efforts by the El Paso Women's Club. Plans for a gazebo to serve as a central gathering spot for events and visitors in the center of Franklin Park commenced in 2021 with completion of the gazebo in October 2022. Nicknamed "Elephant Park" due to its iconic elephant slide, Franklin Park remains a cherished recreational area in El Paso.

=== Corn Belt Park ===
Established in 1951 on a former Fursman & Straight tile factory clay pit purchased by the city on October 4, 1920, Corn Belt Park has been a central recreational area in El Paso. The city used the pit located at Main Street and Pine Street for refuse until full, leveling the area in 1951 for conversion into a park named El Paso Corn Belt Park. The park currently offers basketball courts, a small playground area, and a sheltered picnic area.

=== South Pointe Park ===
South Pointe Park, located on the southern edge of El Paso, offers modern recreational facilities including walking trails, sports fields, recreation center, pool, and playground. Development of the park began in 1987 with the city's purchase of the land south of Clay Street. An Olympic-sized swimming pool with a lap pool and diving board opened for use in 1992. The Community Building directly to the east of the pool also opened in 1992 and provides space for public meetings, private events, and local programs. With construction beginning on the facility in 2022, the American Buildings Recreation Center features a gymnasium, fitness rooms, and spaces for indoor sports and exercise classes, significantly expanding the park's year-round recreational offerings. Today, South Pointe Park remains an essential part of the El Paso community, supporting sports leagues, family gatherings, and various public events.

=== Bike Trail & Walking Path ===
The Bike Trail & Walking Path is a 5.4-mile multi-use path that extends from approximately 1.5 miles north of El Paso to South Pointe Park, effectively bisecting the community. Developed along a former railroad right-of-way as part of the Rails to Trails program beginning in 1989, the trail offers a flat, accessible route for both cyclists and pedestrians. The trail begins at South Pointe Park on the city's south side and traverses through El Paso, concluding near a creek north of town amidst cultivated fields. The 1.3-mile northern extension was added via a grand in 1992. This conversion of the abandoned railway into a recreational asset reflects the city's commitment to repurposing historical infrastructure for community benefit.

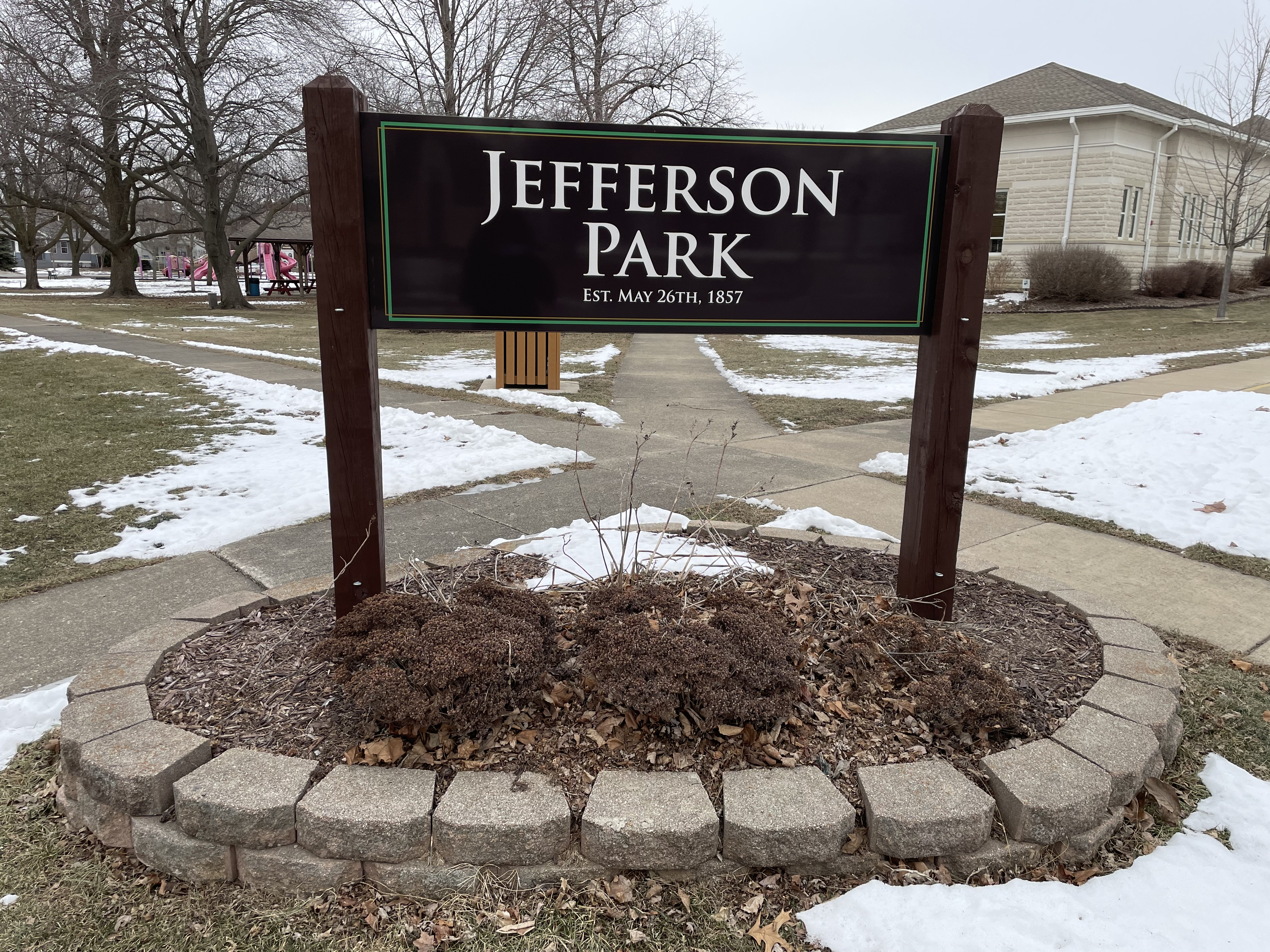
Jefferson Park Est. May 26, 1857

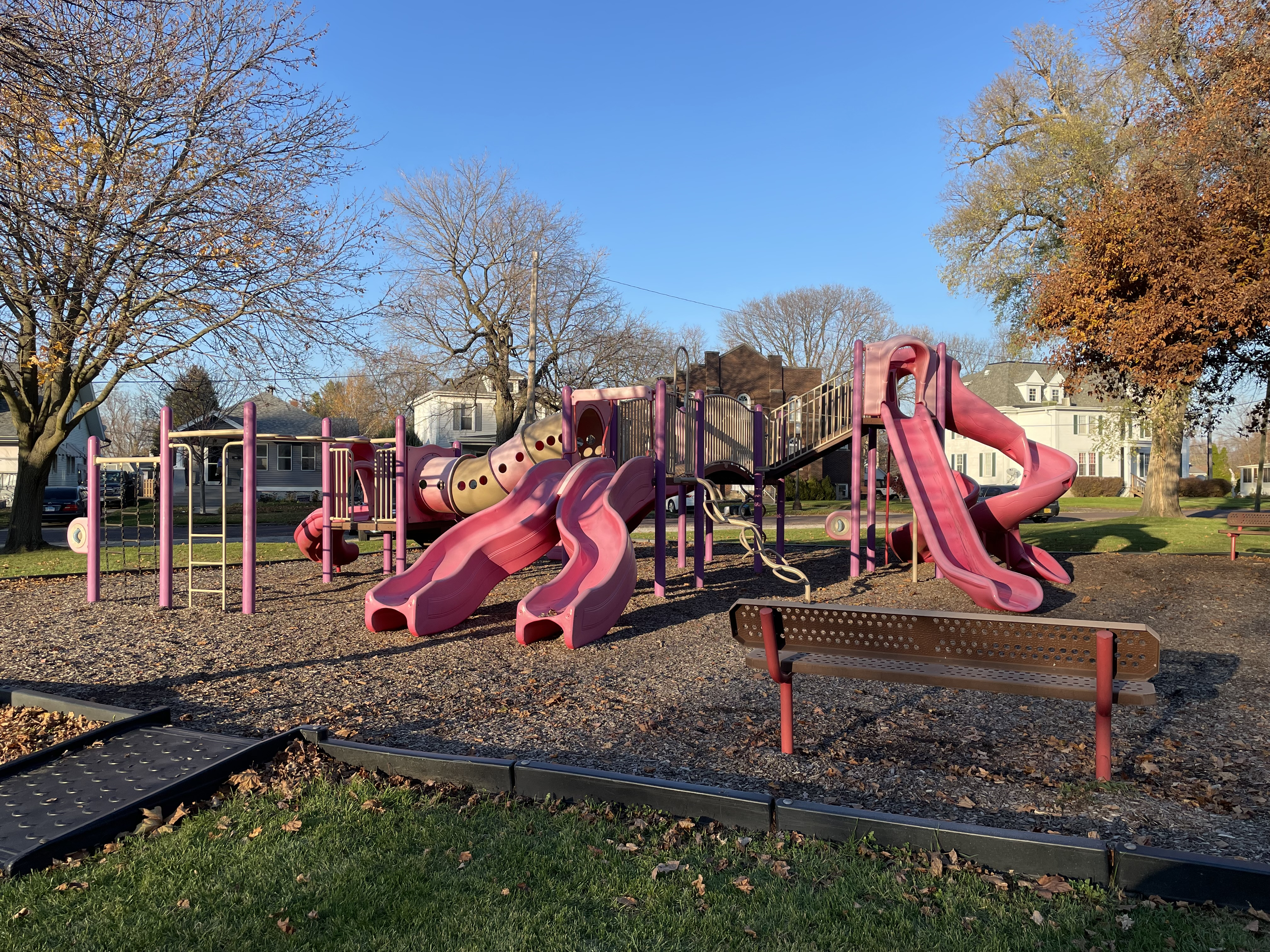
Jefferson Park Playground

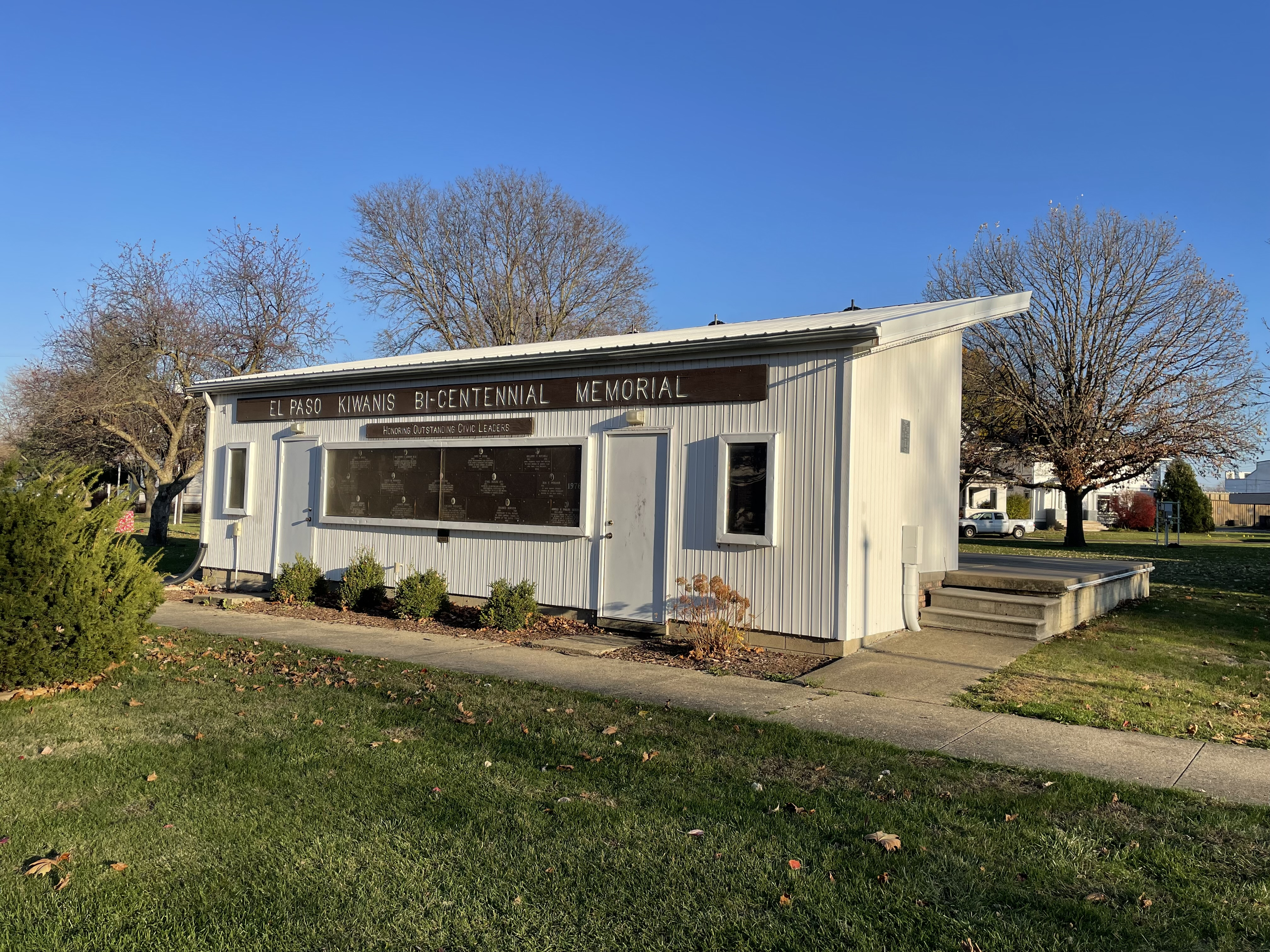
El Paso Kiwanis Bi-centennial Memorial in Jefferson Park

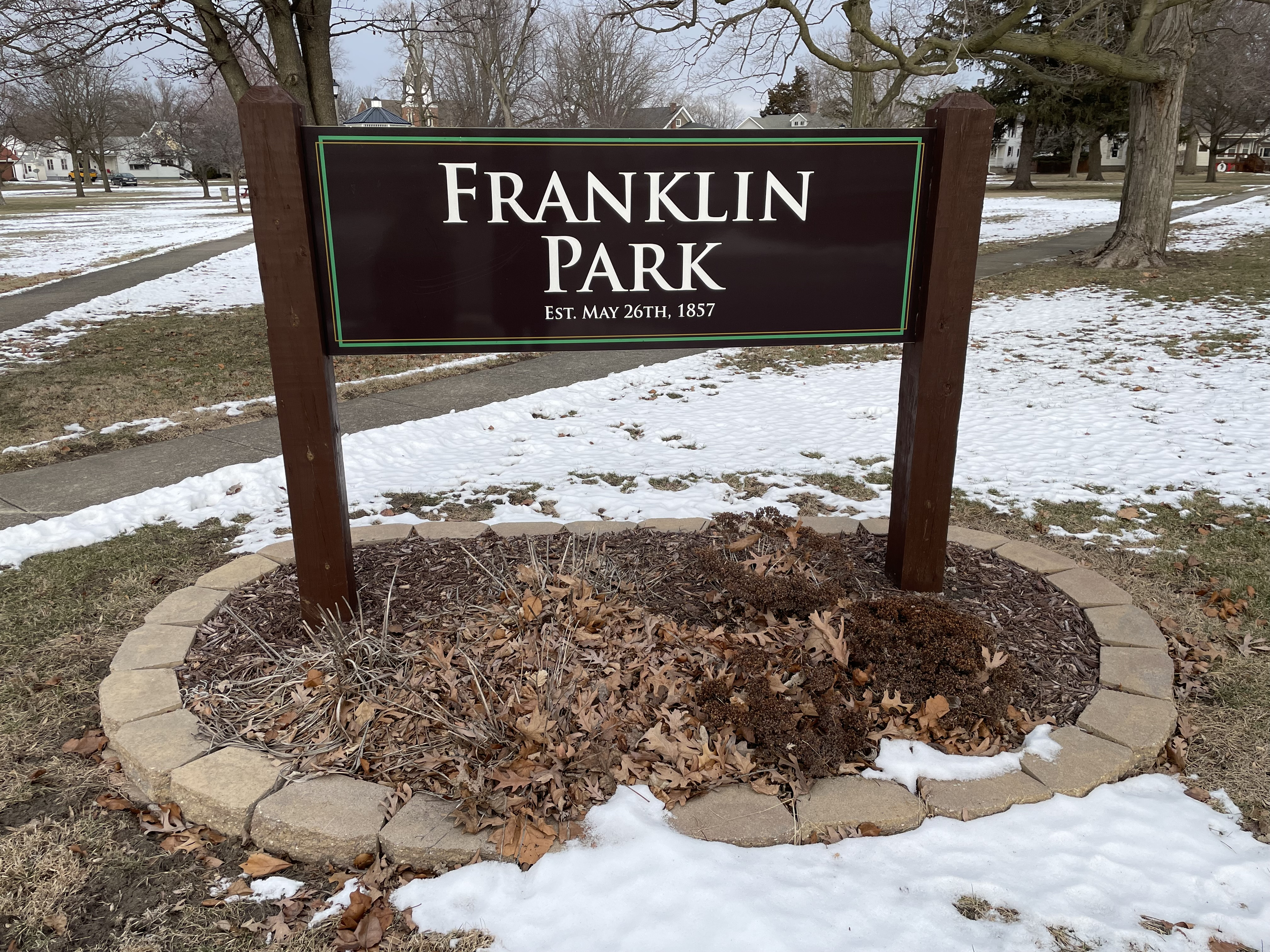
Franklin Park Est. May 26, 1857

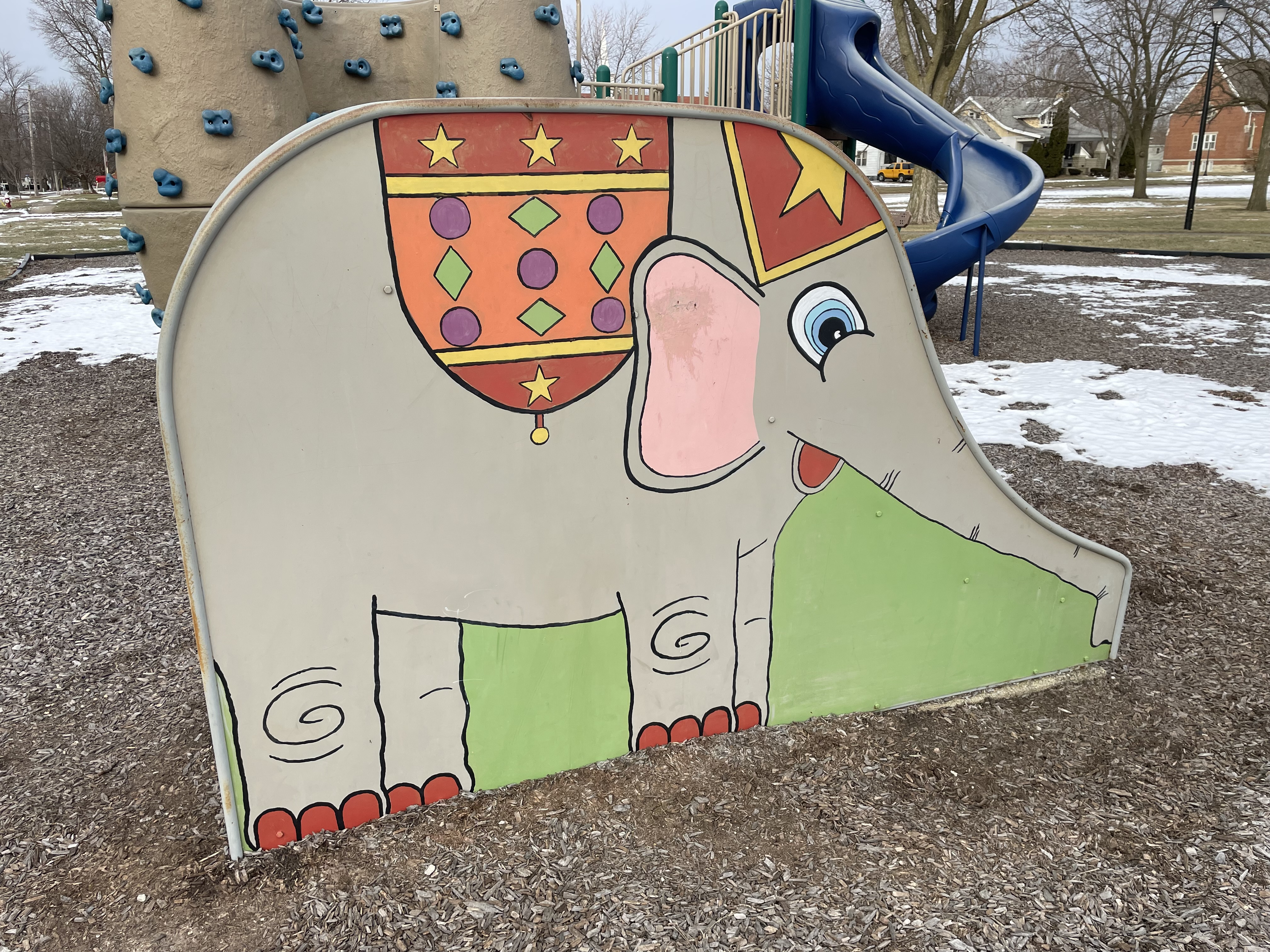
Elephant Slide in Franklin Park

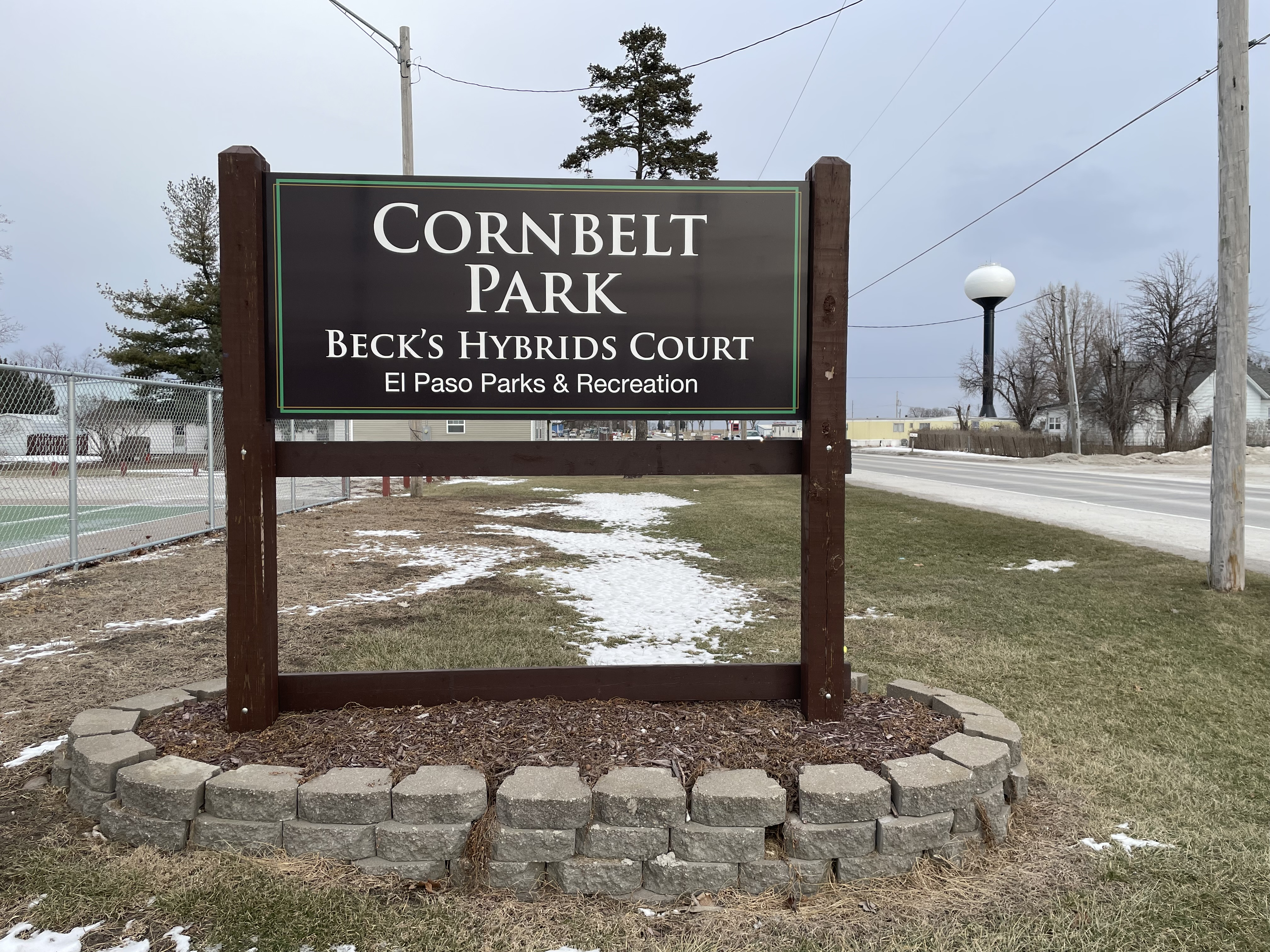
Cornbelt Park

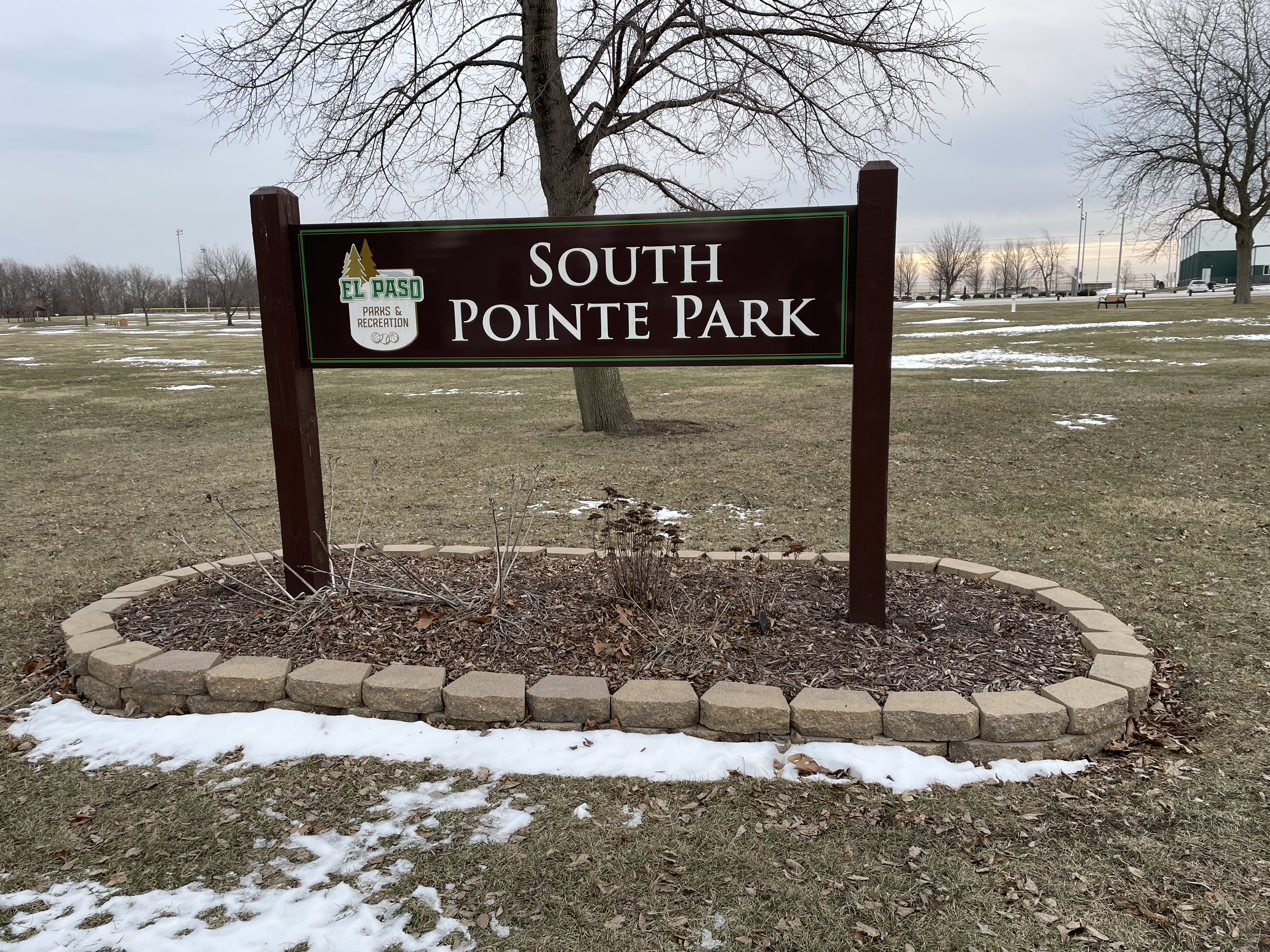
South Pointe Park

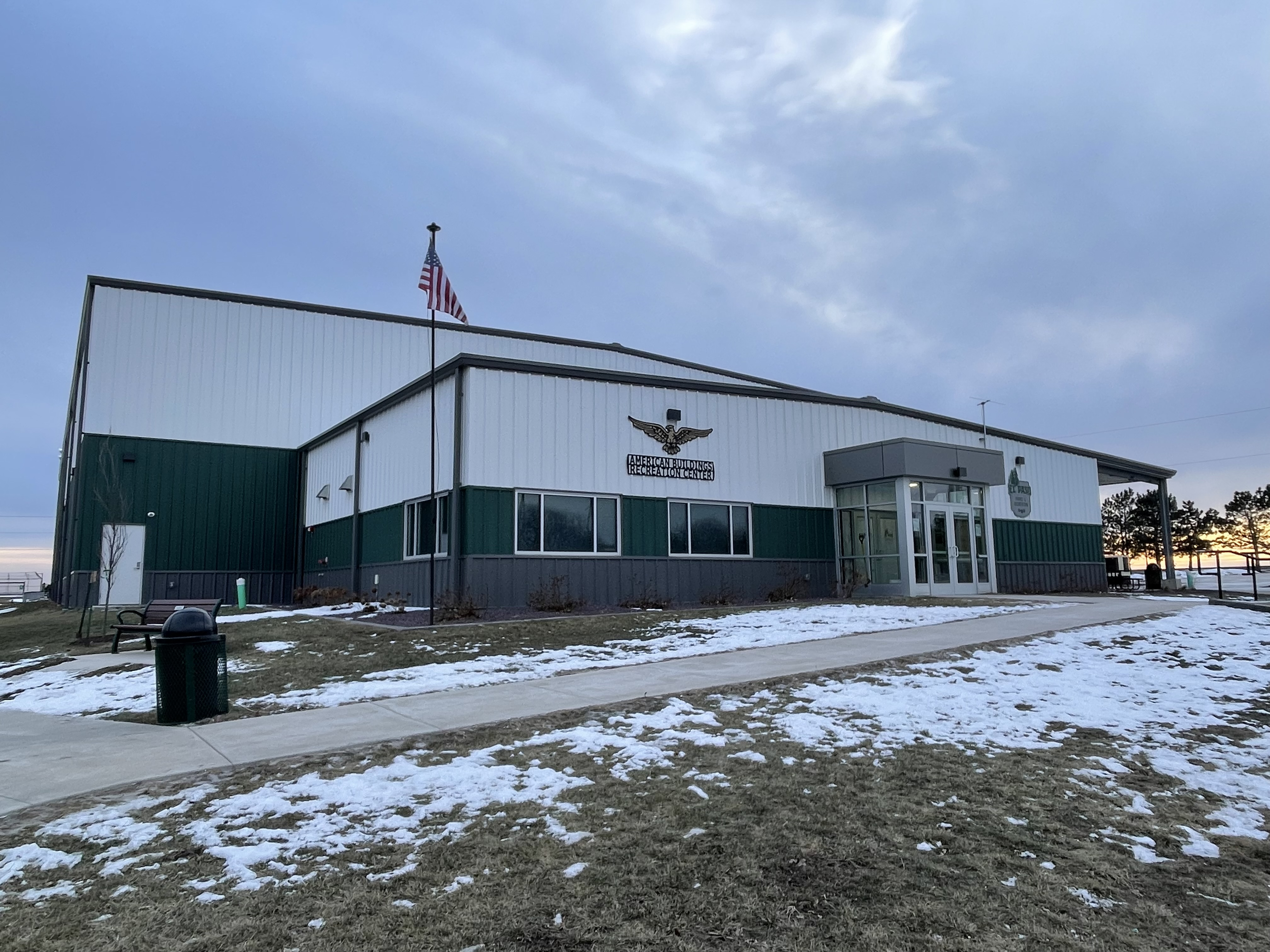
American Buildings Recreation Center

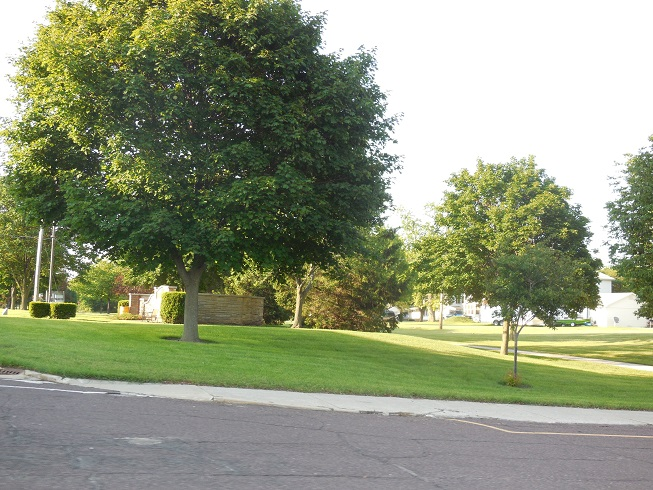
Bike Trail & Walking Path

== Notable people ==
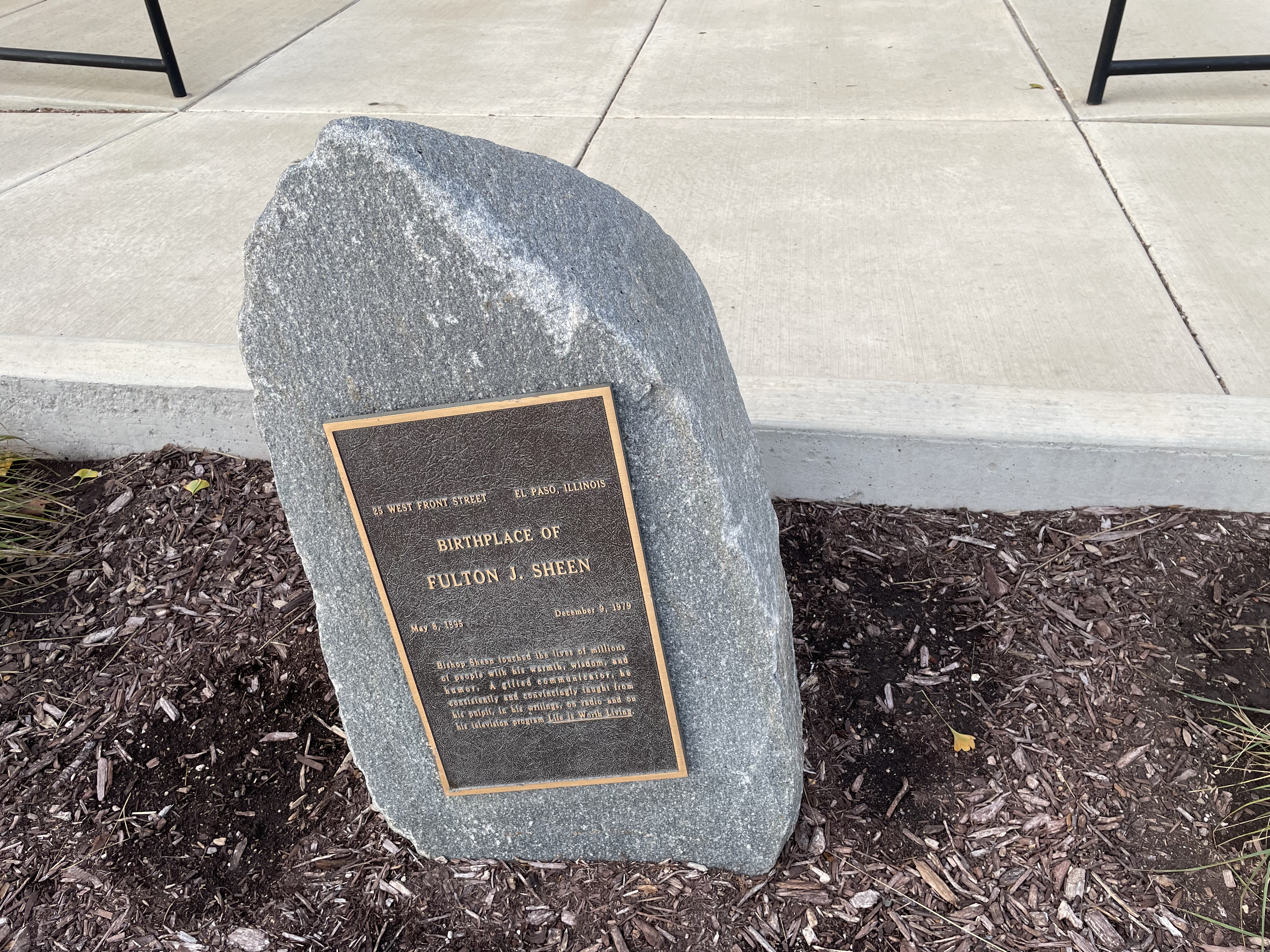
Fulton J. Sheen Birthplace Marker

- Chick Evans, college athletics coach; raised in El Paso
- Byron Keith, actor, best known for recurring roles in Batman (TV series) and 77 Sunset Strip; born in El Paso
- Bern Shanks, conservationist
- Fulton J. Sheen, Catholic archbishop and televangelist; born in El Paso
- David A. Strother, voting rights activist; lived and died in El Paso
- Elsa Swartz, composer and music educator; born in El Paso
- Ryan Unzicker, racing driver; born in El Paso
- Clifford J. Vogelsang, Illinois state senator, judge, and lawyer; born in El Paso
