= Ronald Horvath =

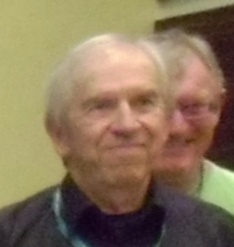
Ron Horvath, 2013

Ronald J. Horvath (born 1937) has made contributions to the study of colonialism, African development, and urban geography of Sydney, Los Angeles, Detroit and Addis Ababa.

== Background ==
Horvath was born in Scranton, Pennsylvania, and educated at California State University, Long Beach (B.A., 1960) and UCLA (MA 1961, PhD 1966). While working on his PhD on "Around Addis Ababa, a geographical study of the impact of a city on its surroundings" he taught at Haile Selassie I University in Addis Ababa, Ethiopia (1963–1965). He was an assistant professor at the University of California Santa Barbara 1965–1967, Michigan State University, 1967–1972, during which time he participated in the foundation with William Bunge of the Detroit Geographical Expedition and Institute. He was visiting COMGA professor at North Carolina Central University in 1969 and visiting professor at Simon Fraser University, Vancouver BC, 1974–1976 before migrating to Australia in 1976. He taught geography at the School of Geosciences at the University of Sydney from 1976 to 1996 before retiring as senior lecturer.

Since 2011, he has worked with the Sydney Alliance, which is dedicated building community and promoting social justice in the Sydney metropolitan region.

He married Barbara (Horvath), formerly an associate professor of linguistics at the University of Sydney.

== Contributions ==
Horvath acquired a range of skills in urban studies and agricultural geography during graduate study and fieldwork in Africa. On returning to the US and publishing in these areas he was soon involved in support for political change and civil rights, and until the early 1970s applied himself to questions of colonialism, race, and poverty in American society. A number of key publications resulted. His participation in William Bunge's and Gwendolen Warren's Detroit Geographical Expedition placed him at the centre of radical, and controversial application of geographical teaching and knowledge in the inner city, activities that were disruptive to academic norms.

An early statement of his interest in transport geography and automobiles came in 1974, "If geographers are to participate more fully in planning and monitoring future technological growth, explicit recognition of the spatial dimensions of technological change will be necessary. Machine space, or territory devoted primarily to the use of machines, shall be so designated when machines have priority over people in the use of territory. Automobile territory in modern American cities exemplifies the concept of machine space." (Horvath 1974: 167-168).

== Publications ==
- Horvath, R.J. 2016. Pedagogy in Geographical Expeditions: Detroit and East Lansing. In S. Springer, M. Lopes de Souza and R.J. White (eds.). The Radicalization of Pedagogy: Anarchism, Geography, and the Spirit of Revolt. New York: Rowman and Littlefield. 101-124.
- Horvath, R.J., 2006. Can we live happier ever after? Australian Review of Public Affairs, 30 October
- Horvath, B. M., and Horvath, R.J. 2005. Pursuing Language Change from the Local to the Global”, NWAVE 34, New York University, New York (Plenary address)
- Horvath, R.J., 2004. Australia: lucky country or laggard? Australian Review of Public Affairs 15 November 2004
- Horvath, R.J. 2004. The particularity of global places: placemaking practices in Los Angeles and Sydney. Urban geography 25(2):92-119.
- Horvath, R. J., 2003, A closer look at the constraint hierarchy: order, contrast, and geographical scale, Language Variation and Change, 2003, 15, 143–170 (with BM Horvath)
- Horvath, R. J. and Horvath, B. M., 2002, The geolinguistics of /l/ vocalization in Australia and New Zealand, Journal of Sociolinguistics, 6, 319–346.
- Horvath, R. J., 2001, The geographical transition of dialects: scaling variability, New Ways of Analysing Variation, 2001 (with BM Horvath)
- Horvath, R. J. 2001, A multilocality study of a sound change in progress: The case of /l/ vocalization in New Zealand and Australian English, Language Variation and Change, 13 : 37-57 (with BM Horvath)
- Horvath, R. J., 2001, A geolinguistics of short a in Australian English, English in Australia, 2001, John Bengamin, 341–356 (with BM Horvath)
- Horvath, R.J. 1997. Energy consumption and the Environmental Kuznets Curve debate. Department of Geography, University of Sydney. Australia. Mimeo.
- Horvath, R. J. Global Development, Geography Review, 1993, 7, 1, 7-9
- Horvath, R. J. National development paths, 1965-1987: measuring a metaphor, Environment and Planning A, 1994, 26, 285-305
- Horvath, R. J. Development and human rights, Geography Review, 1994, 8, 1, 12-16
- Horvath, R.J. A skills atlas of Western Sydney, Department of Geography, University of Sydney, 1989 (with K Mee, C Mills)
- Horvath, R.J., G.E. Harrison, R.M. Dowling. 1989. Sydney: a social atlas. Sydney: Sydney University Press.
- Horvath, R. J., 1988, Restructuring in U.S. Manufacturing: The Decline of Monopoly Capitalism, Annals Association of American Geographers,78, 3, 473–490 (with KD Gibson, D Shakow, J Graham)
- Horvath, R. J. and Engels, B., 1985, 'The Residential Restructuring of Inner Sydney' in Ian Burnley and James Forrest (eds), Living in Cities: Urbanism and Society in Metropolitan Australia, Allen and Unwin, Sydney, 1985, pp. 143–159
- Horvath, R.J., & Gibson, K.D. 1984. Abstraction in Marx's method. Antipode 16(1): 12-25.
- Horvath, R.J. 1983. Aspects of a theory of transition within the capitalist mode of production. Environment and Planning D: Society and Space 1(2): 121-138 (with K. D. Gibson).
- Gibson, K.D., & Horvath, R.J. 1983. Global capital and the restructuring crisis in Australian manufacturing. Economic Geography 59(2): 178-194.
- Horvath, R. J., 1981, Class Structure in Australian History', Antipode, 1981, 13, 1, 45–49 (with P Rogers)
- Cooper, R.L., & Horvath, R.J. 1976. Language, Migration and Urbanization. In Bender, ML (ed.) Language in Ethiopia. London. 191-212.
- Horvath, R.J. 1974. Machine space. Geographical Review 64: 167-188.
- Horvath, R.J. 1973. Language, migration, and urbanization in Ethiopia. Anthropological Linguistics 15(5):221-243 (with Cooper, R.L.).
- Horvath, R.J. 1972. A Definition of Colonialism. Cultural Anthropology 13(1): 45-57.
- Horvath R.J. 1971. The ‘Detroit Geographical Expedition and Institute’ experience. Antipode 3(1):73-85
- Horvath, R. J., On the relevance of participant observation, Antipode, 1970, 2, 1, 30-37
- Horvath R.J., D.R. Deskins, A.E. Larimore. 1969. Activity concerning Black America in university departments granting MA and PhD degrees in geography. The Professional Geographer 21(3)
- Horvath, R. J. 1968, Addis Ababa's eucalyptus forest, Journal of Ethiopian Studies, 6, 13–19.
- Horvath, R. J. 1968, Towns in Ethiopia, Erdkunde, Band XXII, 42–51.
- Horvath, R.J. 1969. Von Thünen's isolated state and the area around Addis Ababa, Ethiopia. Annals of the Association of American Geographers 59(2): 308-323.
- Horvath, R.J. 1969. In search of a theory of urbanization: notes on the colonial city. East Lakes Geographer 5:69-82.
- Horvath, R.J. 1969. The wandering capitals of Ethiopia. Journal of African History 10(2):205-219.
- Horvath, R. J., The present pertinence of Von Thunen's theory, Annals Association of American Geographers, 1967, 57, 4, 810–815.
- Spencer, J.E., & Horvath, R.J. 1963. How does an agricultural region originate? Annals of the Association of American Geographers 53(1), 74–90.
