= Joseph Schertz House =

Historic house in Illinois, United States

- U.S. National Register of Historic Places
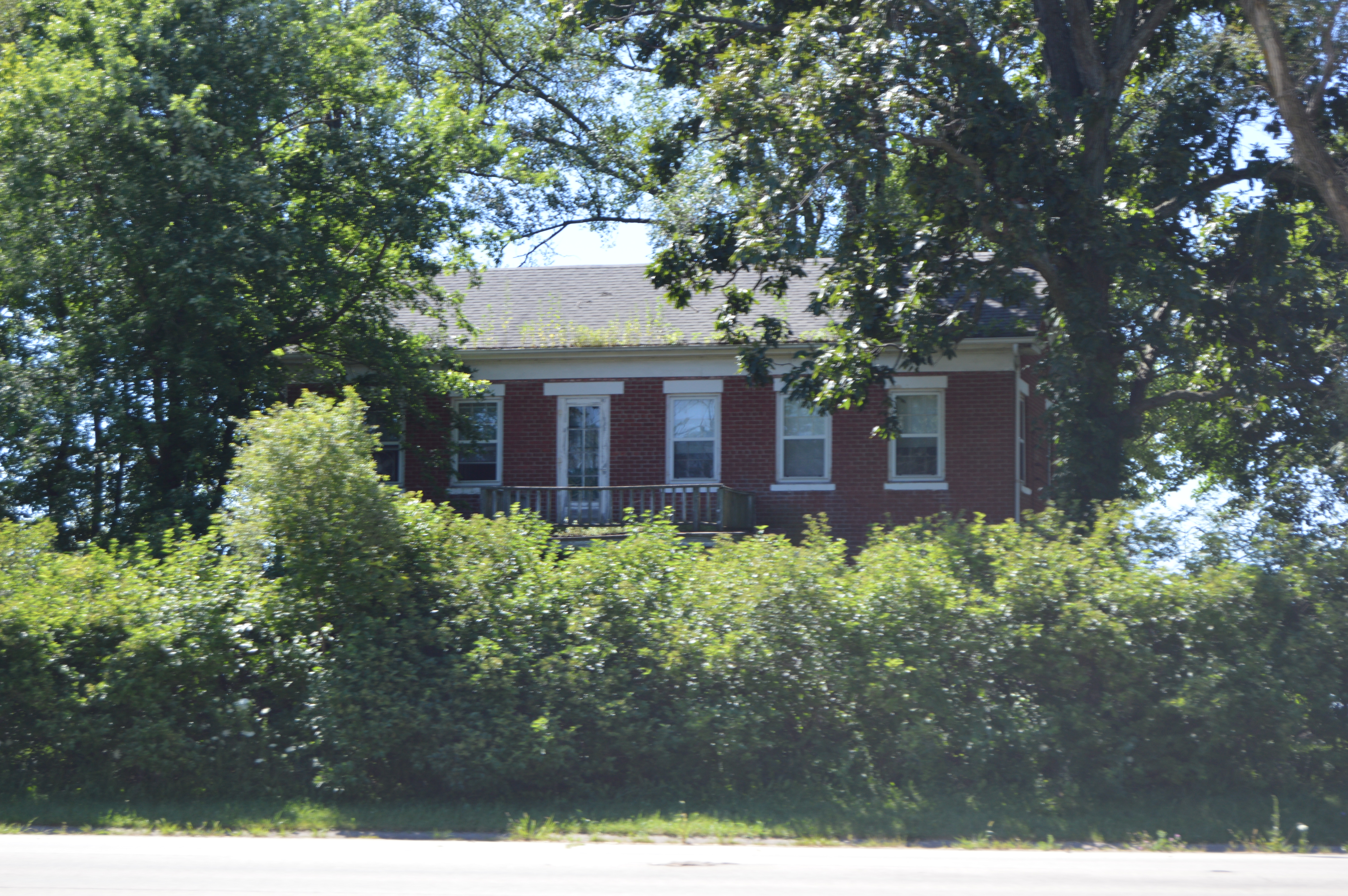

- Location within Illinois Location within the United States
- Nearest city: Metamora, Illinois
- Coordinates: 40°46′43″N 89°24′35″W
- Area: 1.8 acres (0.73 ha)
- Built: 1862
- Architectural style: Greek Revival
- NRHP reference No.: 95000491
- Added to NRHP: April 20, 1995

The Joseph Schertz House is a historic house located on Illinois Route 116 1 mile (1.6 km) west of Metamora, Illinois. Built in 1862 for area pioneer Joseph Schertz, the house is an example of a Greek Revival styled I-house. The two-story house is composed of a central hall and stairway with a room on either side on each floor, the typical I-house floor plan, and is topped by a side gabled roof. Key Greek Revival elements of the house include its six-over-six windows with stone sills and lintels and its frieze board and cornice below the roof.

The house was added to the National Register of Historic Places on April 20, 1995.
