= El Paso Public Library (Illinois) =

- U.S. National Register of Historic Places
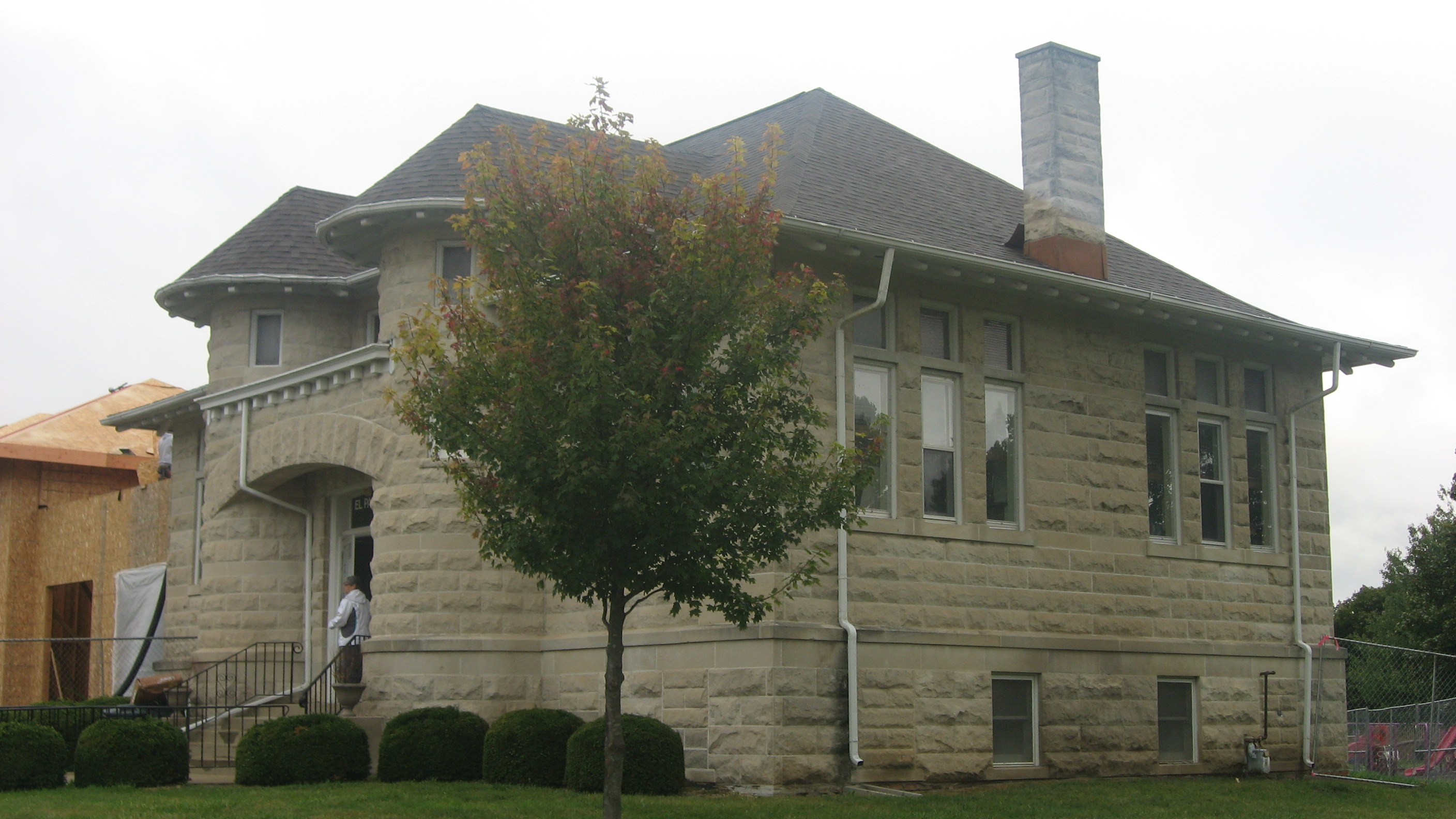
- Front and eastern side

- Location within Illinois Location within the United States
- Location: 149 W. First St., El Paso, Illinois
- Coordinates: 40°44′22.5″N 89°1′7″W
- Area: less than one acre
- Built: 1906-07
- Built by: Joseph A. Reichel
- Architect: Paul O. Moratz
- Architectural style: Romanesque
- MPS: Illinois Carnegie Libraries MPS
- NRHP reference No.: 94000972
- Added to NRHP: August 16, 1994

The El Paso Public Library is a Carnegie library located at 149 West First Street in El Paso, Illinois, United States. The library building was built in 1906–07 to house the city's library, which originated in 1873. Architect Paul O. Moratz designed the building in the Richardsonian Romanesque style. The library was added to the National Register of Historic Places in 1994.

== History ==
The library's existence dates back to 1873, when the Ladies' Library Association formed in El Paso. The library was originally kept in a room of the Eagle Block Building; however, when that building burned down in 1894, the library was destroyed. Following the fire, the new library took on a temporary home while the Ladies' Library Association discussed finding a permanent building and giving the city control over the library. The city assumed ownership of the library in 1904 and approved a library tax the following year. In 1906, the city received a $6000 grant from the Carnegie Foundation for a library building. The library was completed the following year and dedicated on February 22, 1907; its collection included 1300 books from the library association and 500 new books ordered for the new building, and El Paso's citizens donated $1000 to purchase even more books.

In 2010, the library began exploring the possibility of expanding the library facilities both to allow increases in usage and library materials and to provide for greater accessibility to the library. Fund raising took place through 2012 and 2013 and construction was begun in 2013. The expanded library opened in 2014. The additional space allowed for a greatly expanded children's library section in the Edward and Marjory Heiken Children’s Room, multi-use room especially for children's programming and additional public use computers. The Lester Pfister History and Genealogy room houses a rotating collection of local artifacts of historical interest. The Drake Family-Heartland Bank Community Room is used both for library functions and as a meeting place for community organizations.

In 2016 the Library Board voted to begin the process of converting the library from a municipal library linked to the City of El Paso to an independent library district which would serve both El Paso and the surrounding townships. In 2017 the City Council of El Paso and the Library Board both voted in favor of the conversion. In July 2017 the El Paso District Library was created and annexed land in the surrounding 4 townships to create a library district that included all Woodford County properties that were included in the El Paso Gridley School District. This fulfilled the board's ambition of making library services available to all students in the El Paso Gridley School District.

== Architecture ==
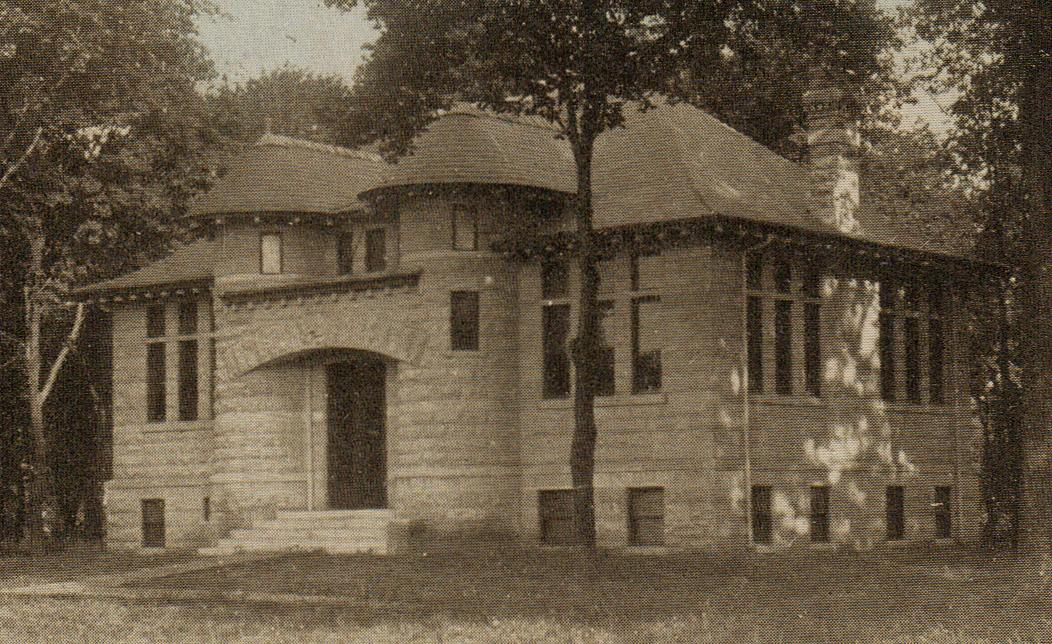
Pre-1912 postcard photo of the library

Paul O. Moratz of Bloomington, who was also noteworthy for his work on his home city's White Place neighborhood, designed the library. Moratz gave the library a Richardsonian Romanesque design inspired by the Morgan Park Library in Chicago. The two-story building has a buff stone exterior with a brick foundation. Round turrets rise on either side of the library's front entrance; the turrets are linked by a segmental arch above the front door. The building's hip roof features exposed rafter tails all around and dentillated eaves above the entrance. The library was added to the National Register of Historic Places in 1994.

When the Library Board decided to expand the library facilities in 2013, the board was clear that the historical building must be preserved. Apace Design provided architectural services for the expansion and created a design that used a similar buff stone for the exterior. Hein Construction was the primary contractor for the expansion project. The excellent design and construction work allowed the creation of a modern, accessible library while preserving the original Carnegie Library's place on the Register of Historic Places.
