= El Paso freight station =

- Illinois Central Railroad and Toledo, Peoria, and Western Railroad Freight House
- U.S. National Register of Historic Places
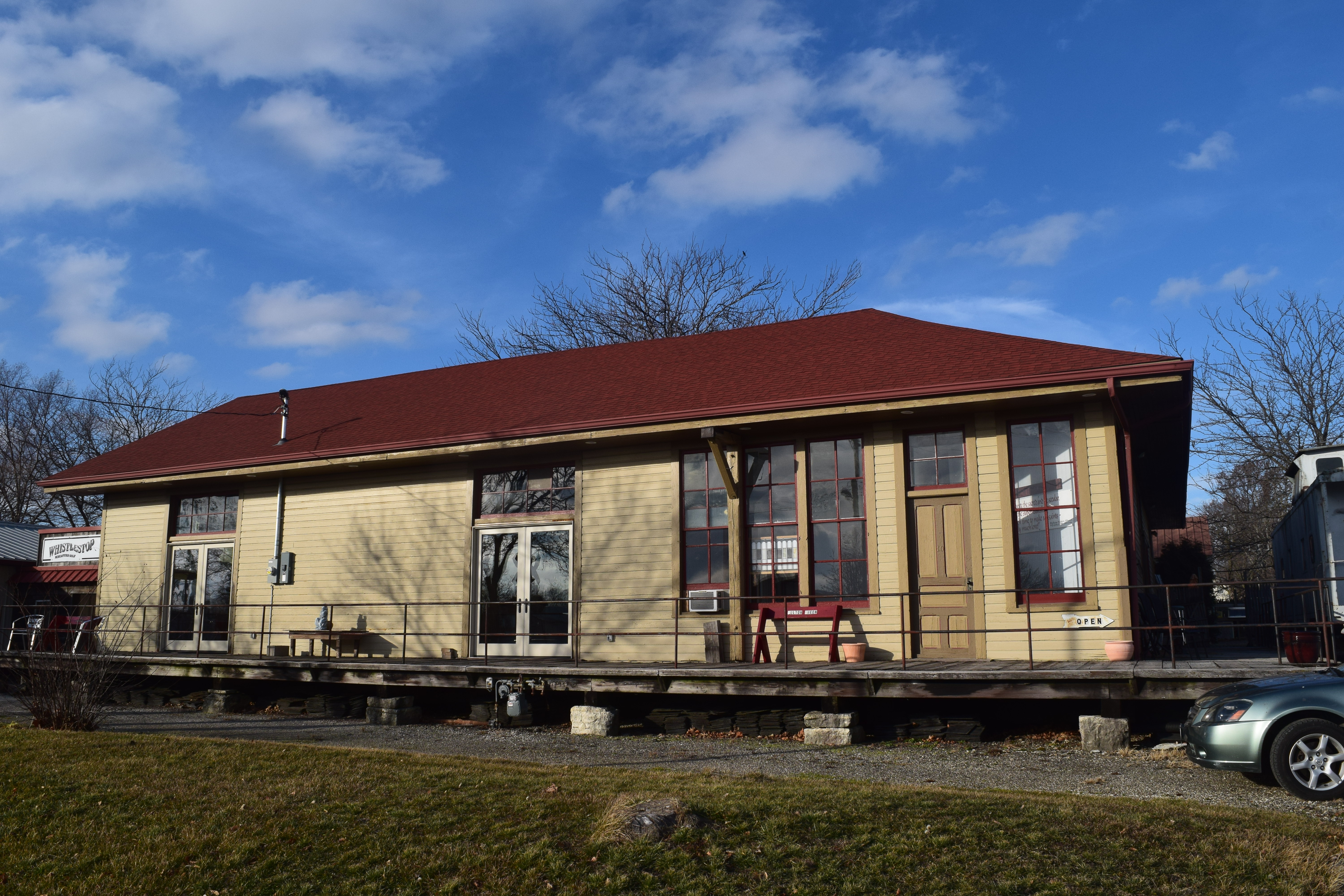

- Location within Illinois Location within the United States
- Location: 8--10 E. Front St., El Paso, Illinois
- Coordinates: 40°44′17″N 89°0′56″W
- Area: less than one acre
- NRHP reference No.: 94000973
- Added to NRHP: August 16, 1994

El Paso freight station is a historic freight depot located at 17 East Main Street in El Paso, Illinois. The freight depot was used by both the Illinois Central Railroad and the Toledo, Peoria, and Western Railroad, the two railroads which served El Paso and contributed significantly to the city's history. El Paso was founded in the 1850s by landowners who wished to win a bid for the crossing site of the two railroads. The newly formed city won the crossing the following year, and it soon grew substantially. The freight depot was built in 1889-90 after the original depot was destroyed. The depot sent out agricultural goods from the surrounding farmland and allowed local businesses to ship products and receive supplies, making it a crucial part of the city's economy. Rail transport through El Paso declined starting in the 1930s and ended entirely in the 1960s; the freight depot was the longest-standing building associated with both railroads, though it was eventually removed.

The depot was listed on the National Register of Historic Places on August 16, 1994, as the Illinois Central Railroad and Toledo, Peoria, and Western Railroad Freight House. The building was later moved several hundred feet to the southeast and is currently located at 17 East Main Street. Though it is no longer at its original site, it remains on the Register.

Preceding station	Illinois Central Railroad	Following station
Panola toward Freeport	Freeport – Centralia	Normal toward Centralia
