= Clayton Township, Illinois =

Clayton Township may refer to one of the following places in the State of Illinois:

- Clayton Township, Adams County, Illinois
- Clayton Township, Woodford County, Illinois

See also

- Clayton Township (disambiguation)
