= Metamora =

Metamora may refer to:

- Metamora; or, The Last of the Wampanoags, 1829 play by John Augustus Stone
- Metamora (shipwreck) in Georgian Bay, Ontario, Canada
- Metamora, Illinois
- Metamora Township, Woodford County, Illinois
- Metamora, Indiana
- Metamora Township, Franklin County, Indiana
- Metamora, Michigan
- Metamora Township, Michigan
- Metamora, Ohio
- Metamora (band), an American folk/Celtic music group on Sugar Hill Records
