= Secor, Illinois =

Secor
- Village
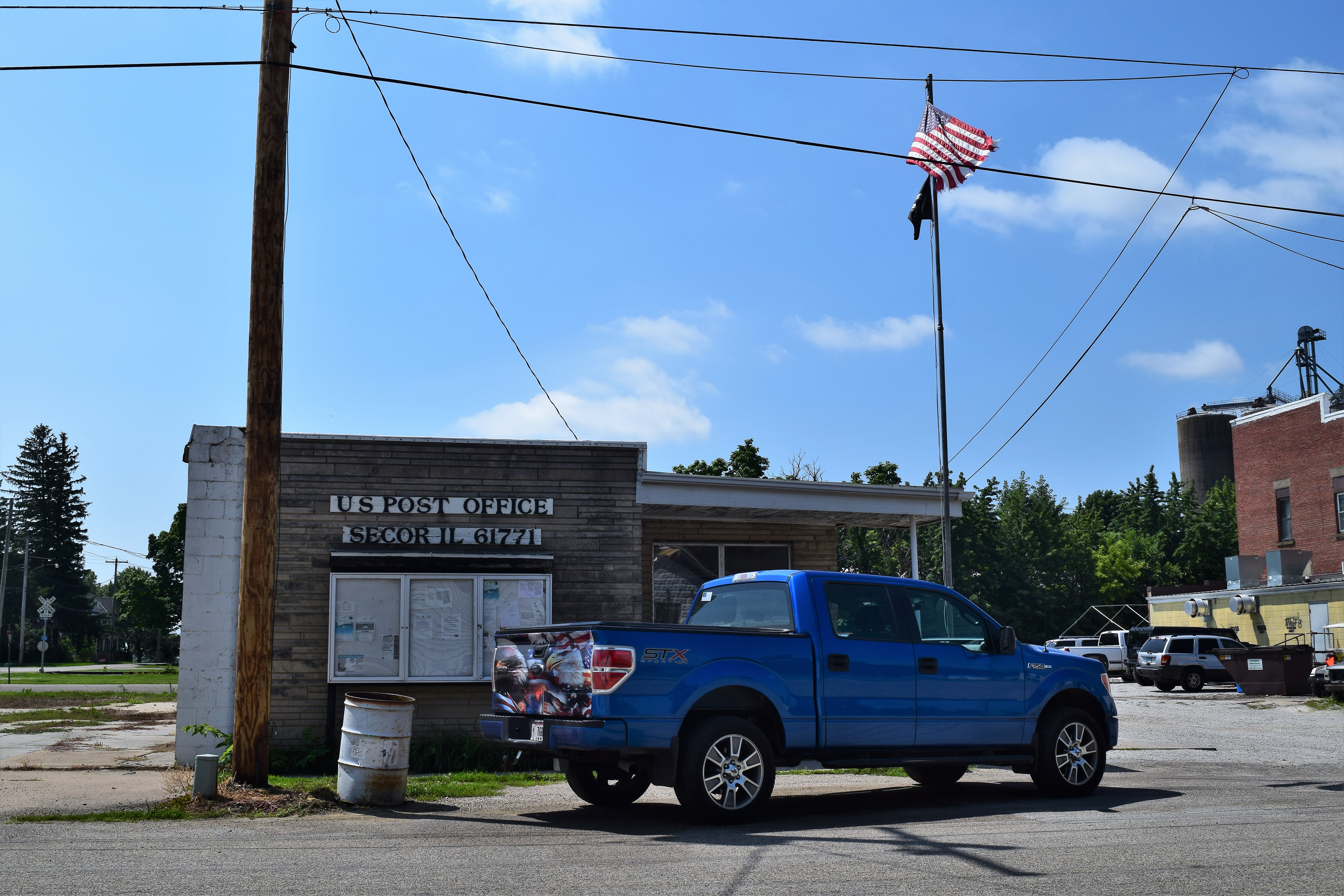
- Secor post office

- Location of Secor in Woodford County, Illinois.
- Coordinates: 40°44′30″N 89°08′06″W
- Country: United States
- State: Illinois
- County: Woodford
- Township: Clayton

Area
  - Total: 0.29 sq mi (0.75 km^{2})
  - Land: 0.29 sq mi (0.75 km^{2})
  - Water: 0 sq mi (0.00 km^{2})
- Elevation: 738 ft (225 m)

Population (2020)
  - Total: 342
  - Density: 1,178.0/sq mi (454.83/km^{2})
- Time zone: UTC-6 (CST)
  - Summer (DST): UTC-5 (CDT)
- ZIP code: 61771
- Area code: 309
- FIPS code: 17-68510
- GNIS feature ID: 2399782
- Website: villageofsecoril.org

Secor is a village in Clayton Township, Woodford County, Illinois, United States. As of the 2020 census, Secor had a population of 342. It is part of the Peoria, Illinois Metropolitan Statistical Area. Secor is located just off U.S. Route 24 between El Paso and Eureka.

== History ==
The town was named after Charles A. Secor. A partner in the Engineering firm that laid out the eastern branch of the Peoria and Oquawka Railroad.

== Geography ==
According to the 2010 census, Secor has a total area of 0.3 square miles (0.78 km^{2}), all land.

== Demographics ==
Historical population
Census	Pop.	Note	%±
1870	407		—
1880	456		12.0%
1890	379		−16.9%
1900	373		−1.6%
1910	358		−4.0%
1920	311		−13.1%
1930	280		−10.0%
1940	335		19.6%
1950	375		11.9%
1960	427		13.9%
1970	508		19.0%
1980	488		−3.9%
1990	389		−20.3%
2000	379		−2.6%
2010	373		−1.6%
2020	342		−8.3%
U.S. Decennial Census

As of the census of 2000, there were 379 people, 144 households, and 109 families residing in the village. The population density was 1,068.7 inhabitants per square mile (412.6/km^{2}). There were 155 housing units at an average density of 437.1 units per square mile (168.8 units/km^{2}). The racial makeup of the village was 99.74% White and 0.26% African American.

There were 144 households, out of which 31.9% had children under the age of 18 living with them, 62.5% were married couples living together, 9.0% had a female householder with no husband present, and 24.3% were non-families. 18.8% of all households were made up of individuals, and 7.6% had someone living alone who was 65 years of age or older. The average household size was 2.63 and the average family size was 2.98.

In the village, the population was spread out, with 26.6% under the age of 18, 6.3% from 18 to 24, 26.9% from 25 to 44, 24.8% from 45 to 64, and 15.3% who were 65 years of age or older. The median age was 38 years. For every 100 females, there were 95.4 males. For every 100 females age 18 and over, there were 95.8 males.

The median income for a household in the village was $44,205, and the median income for a family was $44,722. Males had a median income of $32,232 versus $17,500 for females. The per capita income for the village was $22,635. About 9.4% of families and 8.2% of the population were below the poverty line, including 6.5% of those under age 18 and 17.2% of those age 65 or over.

== Education ==
It is in the El Paso-Gridley Community Unit School District 11.

== Notable person ==
Wilhelmina "Minnie" Vautrin (1886–1941) was born in Secor and was founder of Ginling Girls College in Nanjing, China.
