= Spring Bay =

Spring Bay may refer to:

== Australia ==
- Municipality of Spring Bay, Tasmania

== Canada ==
- Spring Bay, Ontario
- Spring Bay, Saskatchewan

== United States ==
- Spring Bay, Illinois
- Spring Bay Township, Woodford County, Illinois

== See also ==
- Glamorgan-Spring Bay Council, a local government area in Tasmania
