= Herman Hack =

American film and television actor

- Born: Herman H. Hackenjos; June 15, 1899; Panola, Illinois, U.S.
- Died: October 19, 1967 (aged 68); Los Angeles, California, U.S.
- Occupation(s): Film and television actor
- Years active: 1925–1967
- Spouse: Signe Hack
- Children: 2

Herman H. Hackenjos (June 15, 1899 – October 19, 1967) was an American film and television actor who appeared in over 500 films.

== Biography ==
Hack was born in Panola, Illinois. His screen debut was in the 1925 film The Big Parade, which starred John Gilbert and Renée Adorée. His final credit was for The Ride to Hangman's Tree in 1967. His appearances in television programs included Gunsmoke, Bonanza, Wagon Train, Death Valley Days, Rawhide, The Life and Legend of Wyatt Earp, Daniel Boone, Tales of Wells Fargo, The Deputy, Sky King and The Big Valley.

Hack died in October 1967 of a heart attack at his home in Los Angeles, California, at the age of 68. He was buried in Forest Lawn Memorial Park.

== Selected filmography ==
- The Alfred Hitchcock Hour (1964) (Season 2 Episode 17: "The Jar") as Townsman (uncredited)
