= Bay View Gardens, Illinois =

Bay View Gardens
- Village
- Location of Bay View Gardens in Woodford County, Illinois.
- Coordinates: 40°48′37″N 89°31′38″W
- Country: United States
- State: Illinois
- County: Woodford
- Township: Spring Bay

Area
  - Total: 0.78 sq mi (2.03 km^{2})
  - Land: 0.57 sq mi (1.47 km^{2})
  - Water: 0.21 sq mi (0.55 km^{2})
- Elevation: 486 ft (148 m)

Population (2020)
  - Total: 354
  - Density: 622.1/sq mi (240.19/km^{2})
- Time zone: UTC-6 (CST)
  - Summer (DST): UTC-5 (CDT)
- ZIP code: 61611
- Area code: 309
- FIPS code: 17-04273
- GNIS feature ID: 2398052

Bay View Gardens is a village in Woodford County, Illinois, United States. As of the 2020 census, Bay View Gardens had a population of 354. The village is part of the Peoria, Illinois Metropolitan Statistical Area.

== Geography ==
According to the 2010 census, Bay View Gardens has a total area of 0.43 square miles (1.11 km^{2}), all land.

== Demographics ==
Historical population
Census	Pop.	Note	%±
1970	472		—
1980	417		−11.7%
1990	418		0.2%
2000	366		−12.4%
2010	378		3.3%
2020	354		−6.3%
U.S. Decennial Census

As of the census of 2000, there were 366 people, 141 households, and 105 families residing in the village. The population density was 2,057.0 inhabitants per square mile (794.2/km^{2}). There were 149 housing units at an average density of 837.4 per square mile (323.3/km^{2}). The racial makeup of the village was 99.18% White and 0.27% African American. Native American, Hispanic, or Latino of any race were 0.55% of the population.

There were 141 households, out of which 38.3% had children under the age of 18 living with them, 56.7% were married couples living together, 12.8% had a female householder with no husband present, and 25.5% were non-families. 24.1% of all households were made up of individuals, and 9.9% had someone living alone who was 65 years of age or older. The average household size was 2.60 and the average family size was 3.06.

In the village, the population was spread out, with 28.1% under the age of 18, 7.1% from 18 to 24, 29.2% from 25 to 44, 24.0% from 45 to 64, and 11.5% who were 65 years of age or older. The median age was 38 years. For every 100 females, there were 105.6 males. For every 100 females age 18 and over, there were 94.8 males.

The median income for a household in the village was $32,750, and the median income for a family was $37,614. Males had a median income of $32,083 versus $23,194 for females. The per capita income for the village was $15,230. About 5.7% of families and 5.3% of the population were below the poverty line, including 6.7% of those under age 18 and none of those age 65 or over.

== Education ==
It is in the Riverview Consolidated Community School District 2 and the Metamora Township High School District 122.
