= Clayton Township, Michigan =

Clayton Township is the name of some places in the U.S. state of Michigan:

- Clayton Township, Arenac County, Michigan
- Clayton Township, Genesee County, Michigan

== See also ==
- Clayton, Michigan, a village in Lenawee County
- Clayton Township (disambiguation)
