= Kansas Township, Woodford County, Illinois =

Coordinates: 40°38′14″N 89°06′32″W

Kansas Township
- Township
- Location in Woodford County
- Country: United States
- State: Illinois
- County: Woodford
- Established: September 1859

Area
  - Total: 18.37 sq mi (47.6 km^{2})
  - Land: 18.02 sq mi (46.7 km^{2})
  - Water: 0.35 sq mi (0.91 km^{2}) 1.91%

Population (2010)
  - Estimate (2016): 444
  - Density: 24/sq mi (9.3/km^{2})
- Time zone: UTC-6 (CST)
  - Summer (DST): UTC-5 (CDT)
- FIPS code: 17-203-39012

Kansas Township is located in Woodford County, Illinois. As of the 2010 census, its population was 433 and it contained 172 housing units. Kansas Township formed from Palestine Township in September, 1859.

== Geography ==
According to the 2011 census, the township has a total area of 18.37 square miles (47.6 km^{2}), of which 18.02 square miles (46.7 km^{2}) (or 98.09%) is land and 0.35 square miles (0.91 km^{2}) (or 1.91%) is water.

== Demographics ==
Historical population
Census	Pop.	Note	%±
2016 (est.)	444
U.S. Decennial Census
