= Cruger Township, Illinois =

Coordinates: 40°42′17″N 89°18′40″W

Cruger Township
- Township
- Location in Woodford County
- Country: United States
- State: Illinois
- County: Woodford
- Established: September 14, 1869

Area
  - Total: 17.08 sq mi (44.2 km^{2})
  - Land: 17.04 sq mi (44.1 km^{2})
  - Water: 0.04 sq mi (0.10 km^{2}) 0.23%

Population (2010)
  - Estimate (2016): 1,721
  - Density: 99/sq mi (38/km^{2})
- Time zone: UTC-6 (CST)
  - Summer (DST): UTC-5 (CDT)
- FIPS code: 17-203-17861

Cruger Township is located in Woodford County, Illinois. As of the 2010 census, its population was 1,687 and it contained 593 housing units. Cruger Township formed from Olio Township on September 14, 1869.

== Geography ==
According to the 2010 census, the township has a total area of 17.08 square miles (44.2 km^{2}), of which 17.04 square miles (44.1 km^{2}) (or 99.77%) is land and 0.04 square miles (0.10 km^{2}) (or 0.23%) is water.

== Demographics ==
Historical population
Census	Pop.	Note	%±
2016 (est.)	1,721
U.S. Decennial Census
