= Partridge Township =

Partridge Township may refer to the following townships in the United States:

- Partridge Township, Woodford County, Illinois
- Partridge Township, Pine County, Minnesota
