= Obery Farms =

- Company type: Private company
- Industry: Agribusiness, Agriculture
- Founded: 1874; 152 years ago
- Founder: Paul Obery
- Headquarters: Metamora, Illinois, United States
- Key people: John Obery; Mark Obery; Joel Obery
- Divisions: Obery Farms Inc.; Obery Grain Inc.; Obery Chemical and Fertilizer Inc.; Obery Farms Partnership

Obery Farms was founded in 1874 with only 127 acres. The Obery family has been farming in rural Metamora, Illinois for six generations and over 140 years. Today, the family farms over 3,000 acres in Central Illinois.

== Documentary ==
In 2009, a 33-minute documentary on Obery Farms was produced by award-winning filmmaker Levi Obery and Ten Thirty-One Pictures Entertainment. The film won a 2009 Davey Award and a 2010 Communicator Award. It aired on the Documentary Channel on DirecTV and Dish Network and was also released on DVD and Blu-ray.
