= El Paso Township, Illinois =

Coordinates: 40°42′41″N 89°01′07″W

El Paso Township
- Township
- Location in Woodford County
- Country: United States
- State: Illinois
- County: Woodford
- Established: September 1861

Government
  - Supervisor: Drew North

Area
  - Total: 24.23 sq mi (62.8 km^{2})
  - Land: 24.22 sq mi (62.7 km^{2})
  - Water: 0.01 sq mi (0.026 km^{2}) 0.04%

Population (2010)
  - Estimate (2016): 3,439
  - Density: 142.8/sq mi (55.1/km^{2})
- Time zone: UTC-6 (CST)
  - Summer (DST): UTC-5 (CDT)
- FIPS code: 17-203-23750

El Paso Township is located in Woodford County, Illinois. As of the 2010 census, its population was 3,459 and it contained 1,387 housing units. El Paso Township formed from Palestine Township in September, 1861. El Paso is located at 40°44'20" North, 89°0'58" West (40.738800, -89.016034).

The largest named community in El Paso Township is the city of El Paso, Illinois.

== Geography ==
According to the 2010 census, the township has a total area of 24.23 square miles (62.8 km^{2}), of which 24.22 square miles (62.7 km^{2}) (or 99.96%) is land and 0.01 square miles (0.026 km^{2}) (or 0.04%) is water.

== Demographics ==
Historical population
Census	Pop.	Note	%±
2016 (est.)	3,439
U.S. Decennial Census
