= Cazenovia Township, Illinois =

Coordinates: 40°54′N 89°19′W

Cazenovia Township
- Township
- Location in Woodford County
- Country: United States
- State: Illinois
- County: Woodford
- Established: November 7, 1854

Area
  - Total: 36.16 sq mi (93.7 km^{2})
  - Land: 36.15 sq mi (93.6 km^{2})
  - Water: 0.01 sq mi (0.026 km^{2}) 0.03%

Population (2010)
  - Estimate (2016): 1,751
  - Density: 48.9/sq mi (18.9/km^{2})
- Time zone: UTC-6 (CST)
  - Summer (DST): UTC-5 (CDT)
- FIPS code: 17-203-11878

Cazenovia Township, Township 28 North, Range 2 West, is located in Woodford County, Illinois. It includes most of the town of Washburn, Illinois and the villages of Cazenovia and Low Point, Illinois and is traversed by State Route 89. As of the 2010 census, its population was 1,768 and it contained 721 housing units.

The township was named after the town of Cazenovia, New York.

== Geography ==
According to the 2010 census, the township has a total area of 36.16 square miles (93.7 km^{2}), of which 36.15 square miles (93.6 km^{2}) (or 99.97%) is land and 0.01 square miles (0.026 km^{2}) (or 0.03%) is water.

== Demographics ==
Historical population
Census	Pop.	Note	%±
2016 (est.)	1,751
U.S. Decennial Census
