= Palestine Township =

Palestine Township may refer to the following townships in the United States:

- Palestine Township, Woodford County, Illinois
- Palestine Township, Story County, Iowa
- Palestine Township, Cooper County, Missouri
