= Cazenovia, Illinois =

- Unincorporated community
- Location within Illinois Location within the United States
- Coordinates: 40°51′01″N 89°19′55″W
- Country: United States
- State: Illinois
- County: Woodford
- Elevation: 781 ft (238 m)
- Time zone: UTC-6 (Central (CST))
  - Summer (DST): UTC-5 (CDT)
- Area code: 309
- GNIS feature ID: 405725

Cazenovia is an unincorporated community in Cazenovia Township, Woodford County, Illinois, United States. The community is located along Illinois Route 89 4.4 miles (7.1 km) north-northeast of Metamora.
