= Low Point =

Low Point may refer to:

- Low Point, Newfoundland and Labrador, Canada
- Lowpoint, Illinois, United States, formerly known as "Low Point"
