= Metamora Township =

Metamora Township may refer to the following places in the United States:

- Metamora Township, Woodford County, Illinois
- Metamora Township, Franklin County, Indiana
- Metamora Township, Michigan
