= Linn Township, Illinois =

Coordinates: 40°53′N 89°13′W

Linn Township
- Township
- Location in Woodford County
- Country: United States
- State: Illinois
- County: Woodford
- Established: Unknown

Area
  - Total: 36.62 sq mi (94.8 km^{2})
  - Land: 36.62 sq mi (94.8 km^{2})
  - Water: 0 sq mi (0 km^{2}) 0%

Population (2010)
  - Estimate (2016): 289
  - Density: 7.8/sq mi (3.0/km^{2})
- Time zone: UTC-6 (CST)
  - Summer (DST): UTC-5 (CDT)
- FIPS code: 17-203-43835

Linn Township is located in Woodford County, Illinois at T28N, R1W. As of the 2010 census, its population was 287 and it contained 117 housing units. Linn Township was formed when it separated from its original township to create two new townships, the other being Clayton Township (T28N, R1E), on an unknown date.

== Geography ==
According to the 2010 census, the township has a total area of 36.62 square miles (94.8 km^{2}), all land.

== Demographics ==
Historical population
Census	Pop.	Note	%±
2016 (est.)	289
U.S. Decennial Census
