= The Only Way (2004 film) =

2004 film

- Official poster
- Directed by: David Zimmerman III; Levi Obery
- Written by: Levi Obery
- Produced by: David Zimmerman III; Levi Obery
- Starring: Billy Kearney
- Cinematography: David Zimmerman III
- Production companies: Ten Thirty-One Pictures Entertainment; Z3 Films
- Distributed by: Ten Thirty-One Pictures Entertainment
- Release date: May 21, 2004
- Running time: 84 minutes
- Country: United States
- Language: English

The Only Way is a 2004 American film about a school shooting directed by David Zimmerman III and Levi Obery. The film is loosely based on the Columbine High School massacre. The film was shot on location in Metamora, Illinois, Washington, Illinois, Pekin, Illinois, and Peoria, Illinois with Metamora Township High School, the same high school from which the film's directors graduated, serving as the principal location.

== Plot ==
Devon Browning (Billy Kearney) is a bullied outcast who has a family member dead, causing him to be depressed. As a result, he shoots up his school, killing his bullies and his date, Jamie (Victoria Corwin), before he is arrested.

== Cast ==
- Billy Kearny as Devon Browning
- Victoria Corwin as Jamie
- Dustin Reinmann as Josh
- Jerry Stowell as Mr. Roberts
- Valerie Christy as Lauren Roberts
- Philip Marcille as Stan

== Home media ==
A limited edition DVD of the film was released on June 19, 2007. The DVD contained the original version of the film (also referred to as the "school cut") and a new "re-cut" version of the film. The 2007 version is slightly different from the original version and most notably contains more violent gruesome imagery and language not suitable for the premiere of the film, which took place at Metamora Township High School. On December 29, 2008, two new DVDs were released: the School Cut Special Edition and the Re-Cut Special Edition. Both versions of the film were also made available On Demand for the first time. The School Cut is targeted at schools and other organizations for educational purposes. A new website, The Only Way: Resources for Teachers and Parents, was launched by the filmmakers as a companion to the School Cut.

== See also ==
- Columbine High School massacre
- School shooting
- Duck! The Carbine High Massacre, another low budget film based on Columbine that was panned by critics
