= Montgomery Township, Woodford County, Illinois =

Coordinates: 40°37′37″N 89°14′25″W

Montgomery Township
- Township
- Location in Woodford County
- Country: United States
- State: Illinois
- County: Woodford
- Established: November 7, 1854

Area
  - Total: 36.24 sq mi (93.9 km^{2})
  - Land: 36.19 sq mi (93.7 km^{2})
  - Water: 0.05 sq mi (0.13 km^{2}) 0.14%

Population (2010)
  - Estimate (2016): 2,466
  - Density: 64.6/sq mi (24.9/km^{2})
- Time zone: UTC-6 (CST)
  - Summer (DST): UTC-5 (CDT)
- FIPS code: 17-203-50231

Montgomery Township is located in Woodford County, Illinois. As of the 2010 census, its population was 2,339 and it contained 873 housing units.

== Geography ==
According to the 2010 census, the township has a total area of 36.24 square miles (93.9 km^{2}), of which 36.19 square miles (93.7 km^{2}) (or 99.86%) is land and 0.05 square miles (0.13 km^{2}) (or 0.14%) is water.

== Demographics ==
Historical population
Census	Pop.	Note	%±
2016 (est.)	2,466
U.S. Decennial Census
