= Cruger, Illinois =

- Unincorporated community
- Location within Illinois Location within the United States
- Coordinates: 40°43′19″N 89°18′36″W
- Country: United States
- State: Illinois
- County: Woodford
- Elevation: 758 ft (231 m)
- Time zone: UTC-6 (Central (CST))
  - Summer (DST): UTC-5 (CDT)
- Area code: 309
- GNIS feature ID: 422592

Cruger is an unincorporated community in Woodford County, in the U.S. state of Illinois.

== History ==
Cruger was laid out in 1856. The community's name honors William H. Cruger, a railroad official. A post office was established at Cruger in 1856, and remained in operation until 1909.
