= Germantown Hills, Illinois =

Germantown Hills
- Village
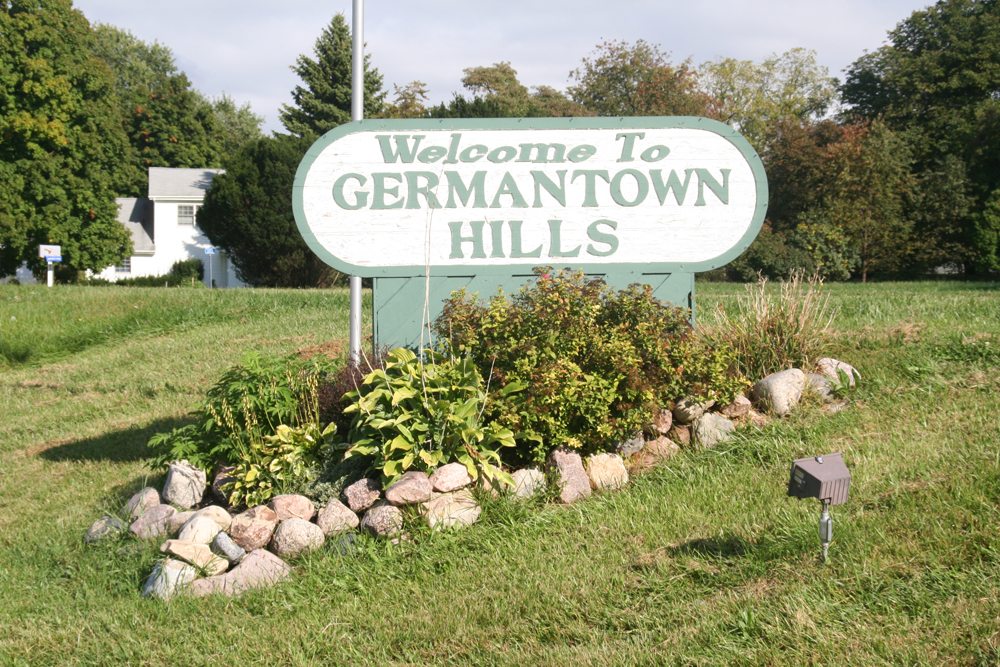
- Welcome sign on Illinois Route 116

- Location of Germantown Hills in Woodford County, Illinois.
- Coordinates: 40°46′16″N 89°28′01″W
- Country: United States
- State: Illinois
- County: Woodford
- Township: Worth
- Settled: 1831
- Incorporated: as Oak Grove Park in 1954
- Renamed: Germantown Hills in 1967

Government
  - Type: President-trustees
  - Village President: Karl Figg

Area
  - Total: 1.68 sq mi (4.35 km^{2})
  - Land: 1.64 sq mi (4.24 km^{2})
  - Water: 0.042 sq mi (0.11 km^{2})
- Elevation: 764 ft (233 m)

Population (2020)
  - Total: 3,412
  - Estimate (2024): 3,450
  - Density: 2,084.9/sq mi (804.99/km^{2})
- Time zone: UTC-6 (CST)
  - Summer (DST): UTC-5 (CDT)
- ZIP code: 61548
- Area code: 309
- FIPS code: 17-29080
- GNIS feature ID: 2398956
- Website: germantownhillsillinois.org

Germantown Hills is a village in Woodford County, Illinois, approximately 8 miles (13 km) northeast of Peoria. Germantown Hills is the only incorporated community in Worth Township. As of the 2020 census, Germantown Hills had a population of 3,412. Largely an agricultural community until its incorporation in 1954, Germantown Hills is now a growing bedroom community in the Peoria Metropolitan Area.

== History ==
Settlement of the area began as early as November 1831, when Methodist Rev. Zadock Hall began preaching in modern-day Worth Township. Soon after, an iron foundry was opened by settler Philip Klein. By 1837, a Catholic church was organized by German Catholics in the area. In 1850, William Hoshor built a tavern and hotel named the Germantown House, for which the village would be named more than 100 years later. A steam sawmill was built in 1860, and in the 1890s, the Union House was erected as a tavern, grocery store, and saloon.

The area remained almost completely agricultural until the incorporation of Oak Grove Park in 1954. The village's founders wished to use the name "Germantown" to reflect Hoshor's Germantown House and the area's large German-American representation. Still, the name was taken by a village in southern Illinois. Upon its incorporation, the population of Oak Grove Park was 182. In 1967, the name Oak Grove Park was dropped in favor of Germantown Hills. The village's population would rise steadily until the 1980 census, when the annexation of the Whispering Oaks subdivision brought the number to 524. Subsequent development and annexation brought the population to 1195 by 1990. Rampant development, fueled by suburbanization in the Peoria Metropolitan Area, brought the population to its most-recent count of 3,438.

== Geography ==
According to the 2010 census, Germantown Hills has a total area of 1.677 square miles (4.34 km^{2}), of which 1.63 square miles (4.22 km^{2}) (or 97.2%) is land and 0.047 square miles (0.12 km^{2}) (or 2.8%) is water.

Illinois State Route 116, a four-lane divided highway, runs through the center of the village and connects it to Peoria, serving as the focal point for development and residences.

== Demographics ==
Historical population
Census	Pop.	Note	%±
1880	188		—
1960	237		—
1970	278		17.3%
1980	524		88.5%
1990	1,195		128.1%
2000	2,111		76.7%
2010	3,438		62.9%
2020	3,412		−0.8%
U.S. Decennial Census

=== 2020 census ===
As of the 2020 census, Germantown Hills had a population of 3,412. The median age was 39.0 years. 28.7% of residents were under the age of 18 and 13.6% of residents were 65 years of age or older. For every 100 females there were 96.4 males, and for every 100 females age 18 and over there were 94.9 males age 18 and over.

99.3% of residents lived in urban areas, while 0.7% lived in rural areas.

There were 1,190 households in Germantown Hills, of which 41.3% had children under the age of 18 living in them. Of all households, 72.1% were married-couple households, 8.7% were households with a male householder and no spouse or partner present, and 16.1% were households with a female householder and no spouse or partner present. About 13.9% of all households were made up of individuals and 6.4% had someone living alone who was 65 years of age or older.

There were 1,240 housing units, of which 4.0% were vacant. The homeowner vacancy rate was 2.2% and the rental vacancy rate was 9.8%.

Racial composition as of the 2020 census
Race	Number	Percent
White	3,152	92.4%
Black or African American	25	0.7%
American Indian and Alaska Native	2	0.1%
Asian	62	1.8%
Native Hawaiian and Other Pacific Islander	0	0.0%
Some other race	17	0.5%
Two or more races	154	4.5%
Hispanic or Latino (of any race)	83	2.4%

=== 2010 census ===
As of the 2010 census, there were 3,438 people (up from about 2,100 recorded in the 2000 census), 1,175 households, and 975 families residing in the village. The population density was 2,055.0 inhabitants per square mile (793.4/km^{2}). There were 1,218 housing units with an average density of 728.0 units per square mile (281.1 units/km^{2}). The racial makeup of the village was 96.0% White, 0.5% African American, 1.8% Asian, 0.3% from other races, and 1.3% representing two or more races. Hispanic or Latino of any race represented 1.8% of the population.

There were 1,175 households, of which 45.1% had children under 18 living with them, 73.1% were married couples living together, 6.6% had a female householder with no husband present, and 17.0% were non-families. 14.8% of all households were made up of individuals, and 3.9% had someone living alone who was 65 years of age or older. The average household size was 2.93 and the average family size was 3.26.

In the village, the population was spread out, with 33.6% under the age of 20, 4.2% from 20 to 24, 26.9% from 25 to 44, 28.8% from 45 to 64, and 6.5% who were 65 years of age or older. The median age was 35.8 years. For every 100 females, there were 100.4 males. For every 100 females age 20 and over, there were 95.9 males.

=== Income and poverty ===
According to the 2005-2009 American Community Survey, the median income for a household in the village was $99,196, and the median income for a family was $105,792. The per capita income for the village was $36,651. About 1.7% of families and 2.2% of the population were below the poverty line, including 3.6% of those under age 18 and 4.0% of those age 65 or over.

== Education ==
The overwhelming majority of the village is in the Germantown Hills School District 69. It comprises two schools:

- Germantown Hills Elementary School is responsible for Kindergarten to Grade 2. In 2008, 314 students were enrolled.
- Germantown Hills Middle School educates students in Grades 3 through 8. The school's 2008 enrollment was 612 In 2008, GHMS was ranked 15 out of the 1357 middle schools in Illinois by results of the Illinois Standards Achievement Test (ISAT).

A small portion of the village is in the Metamora Township High School District 122.

All of it is in Metamora Township High School District 122, responsible for Grades 9 through 12. The village's high school students attend Metamora Township High School in neighboring Metamora.
