= Metamora Township High School =

Public school in Illinois, US

- The school's official logo, featuring a Redbird

Location
- 101 West Madison Street; Metamora, Woodford County, Illinois 61548; United States; 40.7945°N 89.3637°W

Information
- School type: Public high school
- Established: 1915; 111 years ago
- School district: Metamora Township High School District 122
- Superintendent: Sean O'Laughlin
- CEEB code: 142-890
- Principal: Charlie Zimmerman
- Teaching staff: 60.84 (FTE)
- Grades: 9–12
- Gender: Coed
- Enrollment: 919 (2023–2024)
- Average class size: 19.0
- Student to teacher ratio: 15.11
- Campus: Suburban
- Colors: Red and white
- Athletics conference: Mid-Illini Conference
- Nickname: Redbirds
- Rivals: Washington Community High School
- Yearbook: Cardinalis
- Information: +1 309-367-4151
- Website: www.mths.us
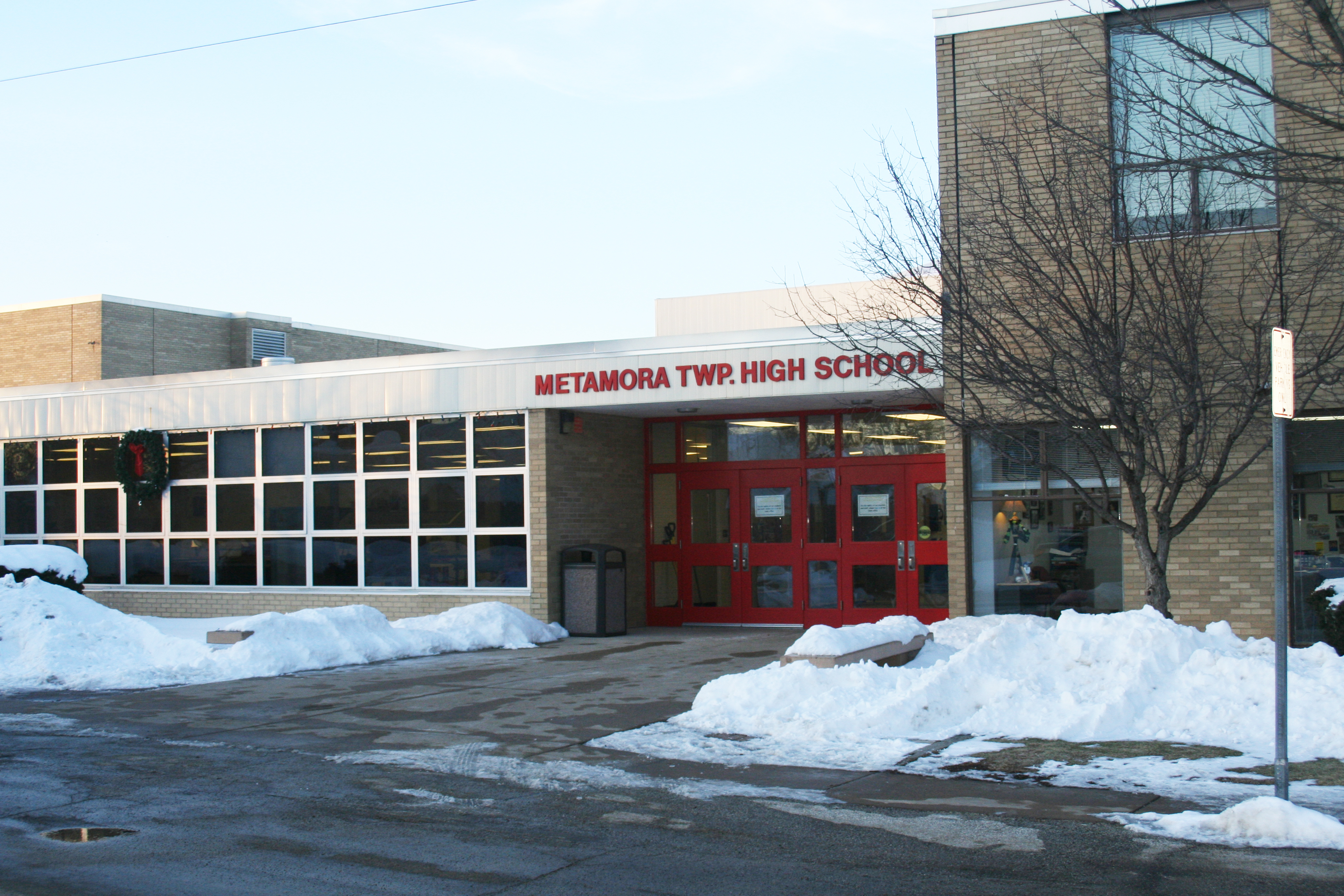

Metamora Township High School (often referred to as MTHS) is a public high school located in Metamora, Illinois, United States, with an enrollment of approximately 1,000 students. The school's athletic teams compete in the Mid-Illini Conference. Its colors are red, white, and black.

== History ==
Early records of education in Metamora date back to 1836, when students attended classes taught in a log house by Betty Page. The village's first public school was built in 1845. This building was sold in 1850, and a more substantial two-story building was constructed on the corner of Partridge and Hanover Streets, offering a one-year high school curriculum. This structure was used until 1872, when it burned down, and a new building was built in its place. Built for $8000 by Soloman E. Egbert, the two-story brick building featured 4 rooms, a grammar department on the lower floor, and a high school on the second floor. With an enrollment of 32 students and 4 teachers in its first year of operation in its new building, the school added a second year to its secondary curriculum in 1878. In 1896, another teacher was added at the intermediate level, and a third year was added to the high school program. During this time, the Sisters of Saint Francis operated an orphanage on Madison Street in the village. When the orphanage moved to Peoria in 1915, the Metamora school board purchased the grounds, added a fourth year and several additional classes to the secondary curriculum, and established Metamora Township High School District 122.

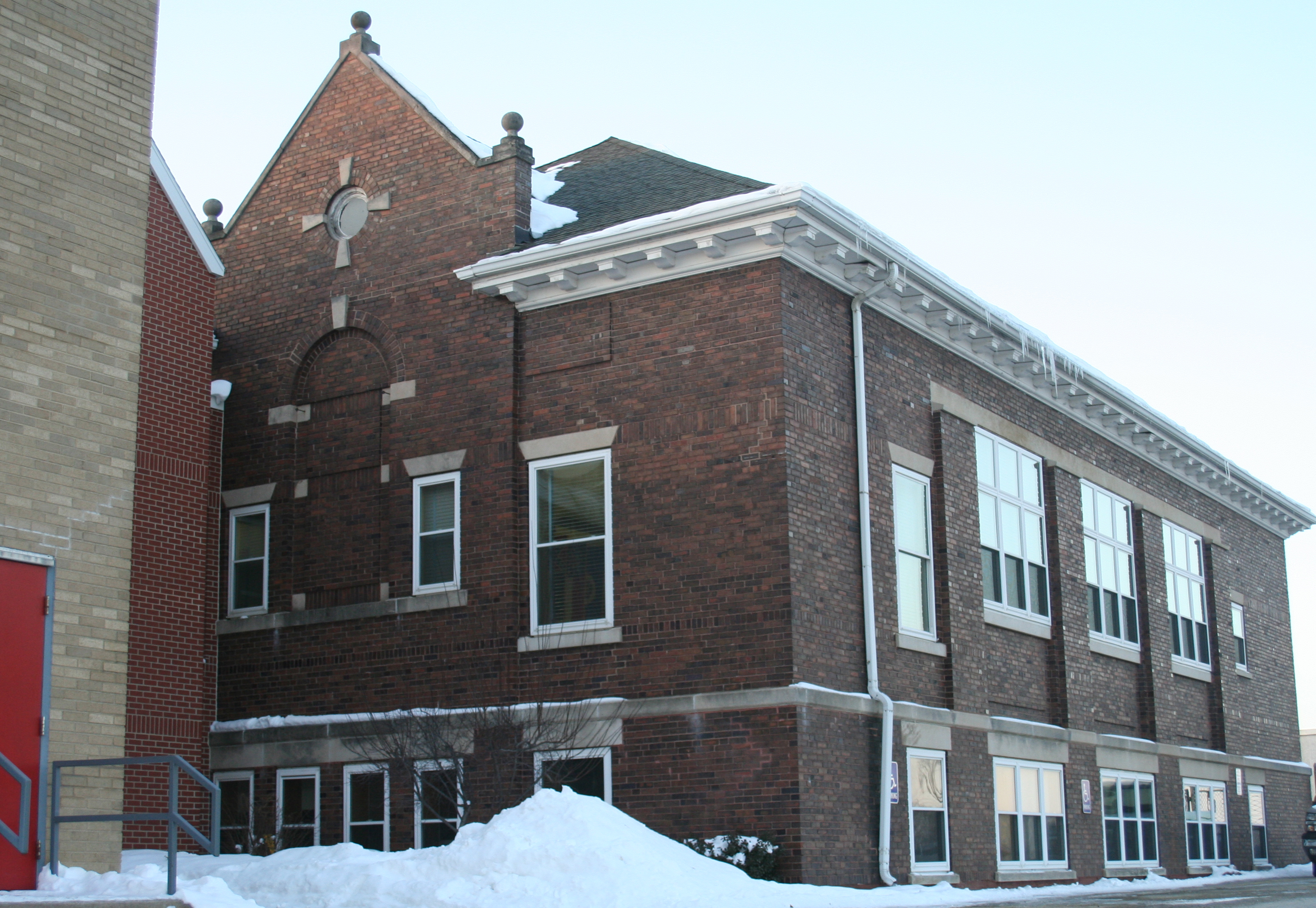
The school's original building, dating back to 1915.

Metamora Township High School was established on October 11, 1915 and has functioned as a public high school ever since. With an original enrollment of 60, the school has experienced much growth and expansion since then. Most recently, profound population growth in both Metamora and neighboring Germantown Hills saw a significant expansion of MTHS in 2000. In 2008, MTHS moved toward alternative energy with the construction of a 165-foot meteorological tower adjacent to the school's grounds, aimed at educating students about weather science and assessing the possibility of a permanent wind turbine to power the school.

== Issues and controversies ==
In 2003, the high school served as the principal location for The Only Way, an independent film about a school shooting produced by two former students of the school.

A large food fight in May 2009, on the last day for senior students, involved about 75 students, 60 of whom were seniors. Several students, other than seniors, were suspended. Seniors who were known to have participated were not allowed to participate in the formal graduation ceremony.

== District boundary ==
Located in Woodford County, the district includes Metamora, Bay View Gardens, Germantown Hills, and Spring Bay.

== Campus ==
The school is located on Madison Street in northern Metamora. It is bordered to the south by residential housing, to the west by a student parking lot, and to the east by McBride and Shoff, Inc. and Illinois Route 89. To the north, the grounds comprise a large athletic complex, consisting of an outdoor track and football stadium (known as Malone Field), baseball and softball fields, and concrete tennis courts, along with practice fields for football and soccer.

The three-level building is divided into hallways and wings, each organized by the function it serves. The school's west portion houses three gymnasiums, a cafeteria, and an auditorium. The school's central portion, housing a library along with most of its classrooms and administrative offices, forms a two-story "H" with both levels following a similar layout. The building's east portion sits at a level between the first and second floors, resembling a split-level design, and houses metal, wood, and automotive shops. Two elevators make every classroom accessible to those with physical disabilities.

== Academics ==
MTHS is the only school in the Metamora Township High School District 122, independent of the three grade school districts that feed into it: Riverview Community Consolidated School District 2, Metamora Community Consolidated School District 1, and Germantown Hills School District 69.

The graduating class of 2010 had an average ACT score of 22.2, an average class size of 19.0, and a graduation rate of 98.3%. For the 2009–10 school year, MTHS failed to make Adequate Yearly Progress (AYP) on the Prairie State Achievement Examination (PSAE), comprising the ACT and WorkKeys examination, the assessment tool used in Illinois to fulfill the No Child Left Behind Act. However, the school has not been identified for School Improvement according to the AYP specification of the No Child Left Behind Act.

== Extra-curricular activities ==
Metamora Township High School competes in the Mid-Illini Conference, in which it is the reigning All-Sports Champion (2008–2009). MTHS is a member of the Illinois High School Association (IHSA), which governs most sports and activities in Illinois. The school's teams are known as the Redbirds, except for the men's and women's cross-country teams, which are known as the Runnin' Red.

MTHS sponsors both men's and women's teams in basketball, cross-country, golf, soccer, tennis, and track & field. The school also has men's baseball, football, and wrestling teams, as well as women's cheerleading, dance, softball, and volleyball teams. Metamora also co-ops with Eureka High School to form a coed swimming & diving team. Although not affiliated with the IHSA or the school, MTHS students may also compete on a men's rugby team. The school also sponsors intramural basketball and badminton teams.

The following teams have qualified for their respective IHSA State tournament or meet:

- Football: State Champions (1975–'76, 2007–'08, '09–'10)
- Softball: State Champions (2009-'10)
- Basketball: State Champions (2022-'23)

The Metamora football program has several IHSA records, including most rushing yards by a team in a playoff game (633) and most State championship game losses (7). Head coach Pat Ryan owns the individual coaching record for State championship game losses (5).

== Notable alumni ==
- Debora Green (b. 1951), physician convicted of murdering her two children
- Caleb TerBush (b. 1990), collegiate football quarterback at Purdue University
- Kenny Robertson, NCAA wrestler and professional Mixed Martial Artist, formerly competing in the UFC
- Anna Peplowski, swimmer
