= Ten Thirty-One Pictures Entertainment =

American film production company

Ten Thirty-One Pictures Entertainment Inc.
- Logo used since 2010
- Company type: Private, film production company
- Industry: Motion Pictures
- Founded: 2002; 24 years ago, Metamora, Illinois, U.S.
- Area served: Worldwide
- Key people: Levi Obery (founder & president); David Zimmerman III; Jesy McKinney
- Products: Films
- Divisions: Ten Thirty-One Pictures; Ten Thirty-One Pictures Home Entertainment; Ten Thirty-One Pictures Television; Ten Thirty-One Pictures Production Services; Ten Thirty-One Records; Obery Films
- Website: tenthirtyonepictures.com

Ten Thirty-One Pictures Entertainment is an American film production company. The company was founded by producer Levi Obery in 2002 and is best known for producing the films The Only Way, Into the Woods, the award-winning documentary on Obery Farms, and One of the Good Ones, the upcoming film from Jesy McKinney and Chase Tarca.

== Filmography ==
Year	Film	Director	Notes
2004	The Only Way	David Zimmerman III and Levi Obery	
2005	Before the Storm	David Zimmerman III and Levi Obery	
2007	Metamora Football 2007	Levi Obery	
2008	Into the Woods	David Zimmerman III	
2009	The Obery Farms Legacy	Levi Obery	
2017	Artifice	Steven Doxey	(in association with Digiphile Productions)
2019	One of the Good Ones	Jesy McKinney and Chase Tarca	(in association with A McKinney Boys Story and Chase Your Vision Productions)
	No Man's Land	Steven Doxey	(in development)
	In the Belly of the Whale	Steven Doxey	(in development)
	Untitled Horror Film	Jesy McKinney	(in development)
