= Clayton Township =

Clayton Township may refer to the following places in the United States:

- Clayton Township, Adams County, Illinois
- Clayton Township, Woodford County, Illinois
- Clayton Township, Clayton County, Iowa
- Clayton Township, Taylor County, Iowa
- Clayton Township, Arenac County, Michigan
- Clayton Township, Genesee County, Michigan
- Clayton Township, Minnesota
- Clayton, Gloucester County, New Jersey
- Clayton Township, Perry County, Ohio
