= Washburn, Illinois =

- Village
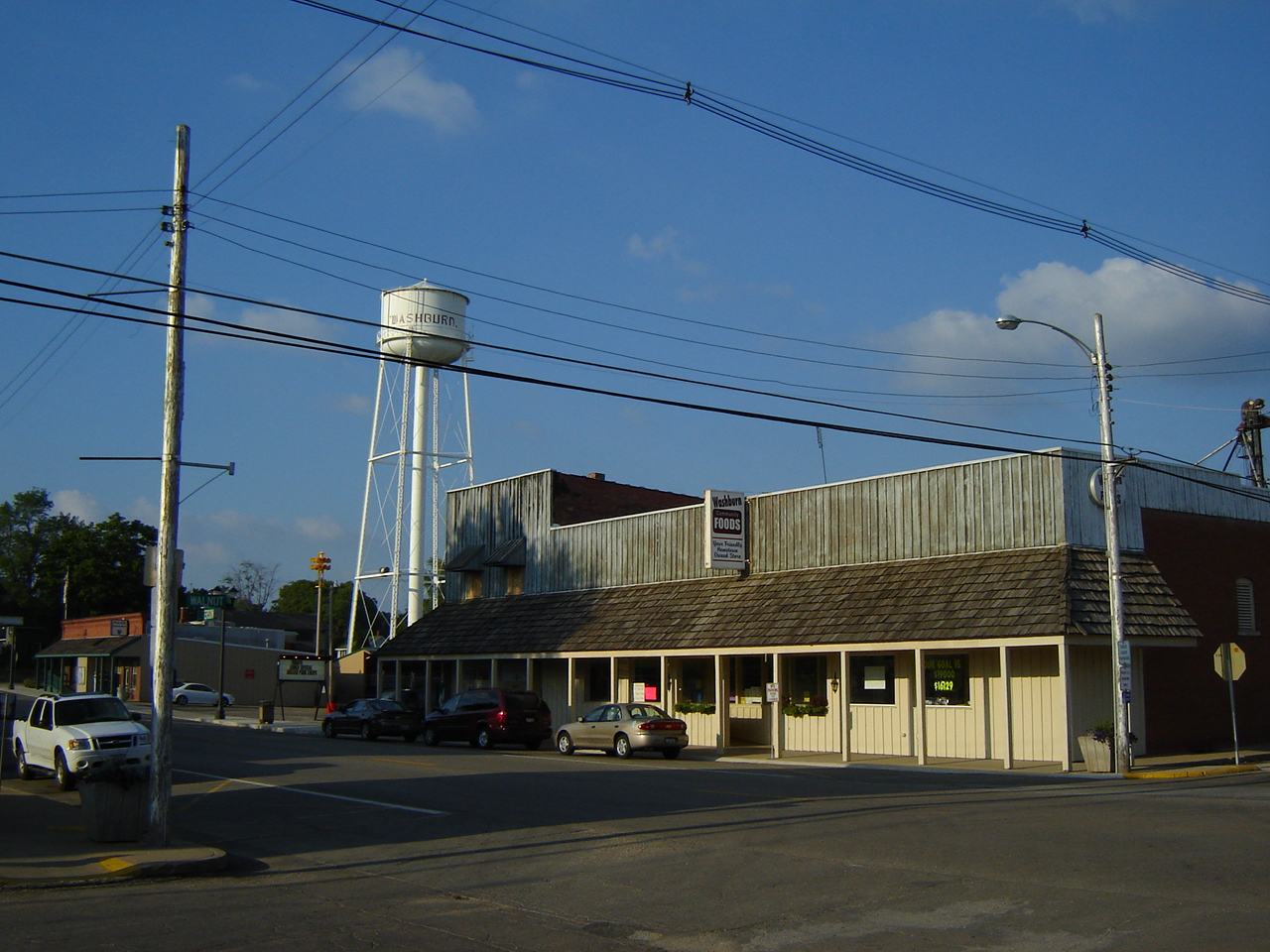
- Jefferson Street, Washburn
- Interactive map of Washburn, Illinois
- Coordinates: 40°55′13″N 89°17′30″W
- Country: United States
- State: Illinois
- Counties: Marshall, Woodford
- Townships: Cazenovia, Richland
- Founded: 1850 as Uniontown
- Renamed: 1857 as Washburn
- Founder: Hiram Echols

Government
  - Mayor: Steve Forney (Washburn Galvez)

Area
  - Total: 0.72 sq mi (1.86 km^{2})
  - Land: 0.72 sq mi (1.86 km^{2})
  - Water: 0 sq mi (0.00 km^{2})
- Elevation: 692 ft (211 m)

Population (2020)
  - Total: 1,032
  - Estimate (2024): 1,011
  - Density: 1,433.7/sq mi (553.55/km^{2})
- Time zone: UTC-6 (CST)
  - Summer (DST): UTC-5 (CDT)
- ZIP code: 61570
- Area code: 309
- FIPS code: 17-79007
- GNIS feature ID: 2400097
- Website: washburnil.com

Washburn is a village mostly in Woodford County, with a small northerly portion in Marshall County, Illinois, United States. The population was 1,032 at the 2020 census. It is part of the Peoria Metropolitan Statistical Area. Washburn was first founded by site owner Hiram Echols in 1850 as Uniontown before its renaming as Washburn in 1857.

== Geography ==
Washburn is an agricultural community in north-central Illinois. It is located in northern Woodford County with a small portion extending north into Marshall County. Illinois Route 89 forms the main north–south road through Washburn as Jefferson Street; it leads southwest 10 miles (16 km) to Metamora and northeast 9 miles (14 km) to Varna. Downtown Peoria is 25 miles (40 km) to the southwest.

According to the U.S. Census Bureau, Washburn has a total area of 0.72 square miles (1.86 km^{2}), all land. Snag Creek flows through the village, running west to the Illinois River near Chillicothe.

== Demographics ==
Historical population
Census	Pop.	Note	%±
1870	272		—
1880	450		65.4%
1890	598		32.9%
1900	703		17.6%
1910	777		10.5%
1920	830		6.8%
1930	854		2.9%
1940	937		9.7%
1950	999		6.6%
1960	1,064		6.5%
1970	1,173		10.2%
1980	1,206		2.8%
1990	1,075		−10.9%
2000	1,147		6.7%
2010	1,155		0.7%
2020	1,032		−10.6%
U.S. Decennial Census

=== 2020 census ===
As of the 2020 census, Washburn had a population of 1,032. The median age was 38.8 years. 26.5% of residents were under the age of 18 and 16.2% of residents were 65 years of age or older. For every 100 females there were 101.6 males, and for every 100 females age 18 and over there were 94.6 males age 18 and over.

0.0% of residents lived in urban areas, while 100.0% lived in rural areas.

There were 417 households in Washburn, of which 33.6% had children under the age of 18 living in them. Of all households, 46.0% were married-couple households, 20.4% were households with a male householder and no spouse or partner present, and 26.1% were households with a female householder and no spouse or partner present. About 29.5% of all households were made up of individuals and 11.7% had someone living alone who was 65 years of age or older.

There were 457 housing units, of which 8.8% were vacant. The homeowner vacancy rate was 3.0% and the rental vacancy rate was 5.4%.

Racial composition as of the 2020 census
Race	Number	Percent
White	968	93.8%
Black or African American	6	0.6%
American Indian and Alaska Native	2	0.2%
Asian	2	0.2%
Native Hawaiian and Other Pacific Islander	0	0.0%
Some other race	7	0.7%
Two or more races	47	4.6%
Hispanic or Latino (of any race)	7	0.7%

=== 2000 census ===
As of the census of 2000, there were 1,147 people, 436 households, and 309 families residing in the village. The population density was 1,576.6 inhabitants per square mile (608.7/km^{2}). There were 476 housing units at an average density of 654.3 per square mile (252.6/km^{2}). The racial makeup of the village was 97.38% White, 0.17% African American, 0.09% Native American, 0.17% Asian, 0.35% from other races, and 1.83% from two or more races. Hispanic or Latino of any race were 0.70% of the population.

There were 436 households, out of which 34.2% had children under the age of 18 living with them, 60.8% were married couples living together, 6.4% had a female householder with no husband present, and 28.9% were non-families. 25.2% of all households were made up of individuals, and 13.5% had someone living alone who was 65 years of age or older. The average household size was 2.63 and the average family size was 3.16.

In the village, the population was spread out, with 27.7% under the age of 18, 10.0% from 18 to 24, 28.4% from 25 to 44, 18.3% from 45 to 64, and 15.5% who were 65 years of age or older. The median age was 35 years. For every 100 females, there were 99.1 males. For every 100 females age 18 and over, there were 94.1 males.

The median income for a household in the village was $44,167, and the median income for a family was $50,385. Males had a median income of $35,096 versus $22,188 for females. The per capita income for the village was $17,619. About 4.8% of families and 8.4% of the population were below the poverty line, including 14.9% of those under age 18 and 8.1% of those age 65 or over.

== Notable people ==
- Bob Barnes, pitcher with the Chicago White Sox
- James Frank Duryea, built and road-tested America's first gasoline-powered car
- Clifford C. Ireland, U.S. congressman, 1917–1923
- George Henry Lesch, CEO of Colgate-Palmolive (1960–1971)
