= Panola, Illinois =

Panola
- Village
- Location of Panola in Woodford County, Illinois.
- Coordinates: 40°46′58″N 89°01′13″W
- Country: United States
- State: Illinois
- County: Woodford

Area
  - Total: 0.43 sq mi (1.11 km^{2})
  - Land: 0.43 sq mi (1.11 km^{2})
  - Water: 0 sq mi (0.00 km^{2})
- Elevation: 732 ft (223 m)

Population (2020)
  - Total: 47
  - Density: 109.5/sq mi (42.27/km^{2})
- Time zone: UTC-6 (CST)
  - Summer (DST): UTC-5 (CDT)
- ZIP code: 61738
- Area code: 309
- FIPS code: 17-57524
- GNIS feature ID: 2399620

Panola is a village in Woodford County, Illinois, United States. As of the 2020 census, Panola had a population of 47. It is part of the Peoria, Illinois Metropolitan Statistical Area.

Panola is one of the smallest communities in Illinois today. It is located about 2 miles (3.2 km) north of El Paso, along Illinois Route 251 (next to U.S. 51).

== History ==
Some sources, including Stewart, pg. 362, as well as several Woodford County history books claim the name Panola was fabricated by J.B. Calhoun, land commissioner of the Illinois Central Railroad, by arbitrarily combining single consonants and vowels. However, the 1954 El Paso Story correctly records that while Panola was assigned by an official of the Illinois Central Railroad, it simply duplicates the name of Panola County, Mississippi as well as several municipalities in the southern U.S. named Panola. Panola is a Native American word for cotton.

Because of its aging population and apparent lack of enthusiasm for others to be involved in operation of the local government, in 2004 the village board of Panola attempted to unincorporate the town. Only one other town in Illinois had successfully unincorporated previously. Of the 33 residents at the time, 27 had voting rights. The measure failed 16 to 11. It needed a majority to pass.

== Geography ==
According to the 2010 census, Panola has a total area of 0.2 square miles (0.52 km^{2}), all land.

== Demographics ==
Historical population
Census	Pop.	Note	%±
1880	127		—
1890	132		3.9%
1900	148		12.1%
1910	108		−27.0%
1920	98		−9.3%
1930	82		−16.3%
1940	51		−37.8%
1950	52		2.0%
1960	43		−17.3%
1970	30		−30.2%
1980	31		3.3%
1990	43		38.7%
2000	33		−23.3%
2010	45		36.4%
2020	47		4.4%
U.S. Decennial Census

As of the 2010 census, there were 45 residents of Panola. The median age of the population was 44. 1 resident reported being both black and white and one resident reported being Hispanic or Latino, while the remaining 42 residents were non-Hispanic whites.

As of the census of 2000, there were 33 people, 13 households, and 11 families residing in the village. The population density was 163.5 inhabitants per square mile (63.1/km^{2}). There were 14 housing units at an average density of 69.4 units per square mile (26.8 units/km^{2}). The racial makeup of the village was 93.94% White, and 6.06% Asian.

There were 13 households, out of which 23.1% had children under the age of 18 living with them, 84.6% were married couples living together, 7.7% had a female householder with no husband present, and 7.7% were non-families. No households were made up of individuals, and none had someone living alone who was 65 years of age or older. The average household size was 2.54 and the average family size was 2.58.

In the village, the population was spread out, with 15.2% under the age of 18, 3.0% from 18 to 24, 27.3% from 25 to 44, 30.3% from 45 to 64, and 24.2% who were 65 years of age or older. The median age was 46 years. For every 100 females, there were 94.1 males. For every 100 females age 18 and over, there were 100.0 males.

The median income for a household in the village was $41,875, and the median income for a family was $40,625. Males had a median income of $47,500 versus $26,250 for females. The per capita income for the village was $24,259. None of the population and none of the families were below the poverty line.

== Education ==
It is in the El Paso-Gridley Community Unit School District 11.
