= Woodford County, Illinois =

County in Illinois, United States

- County
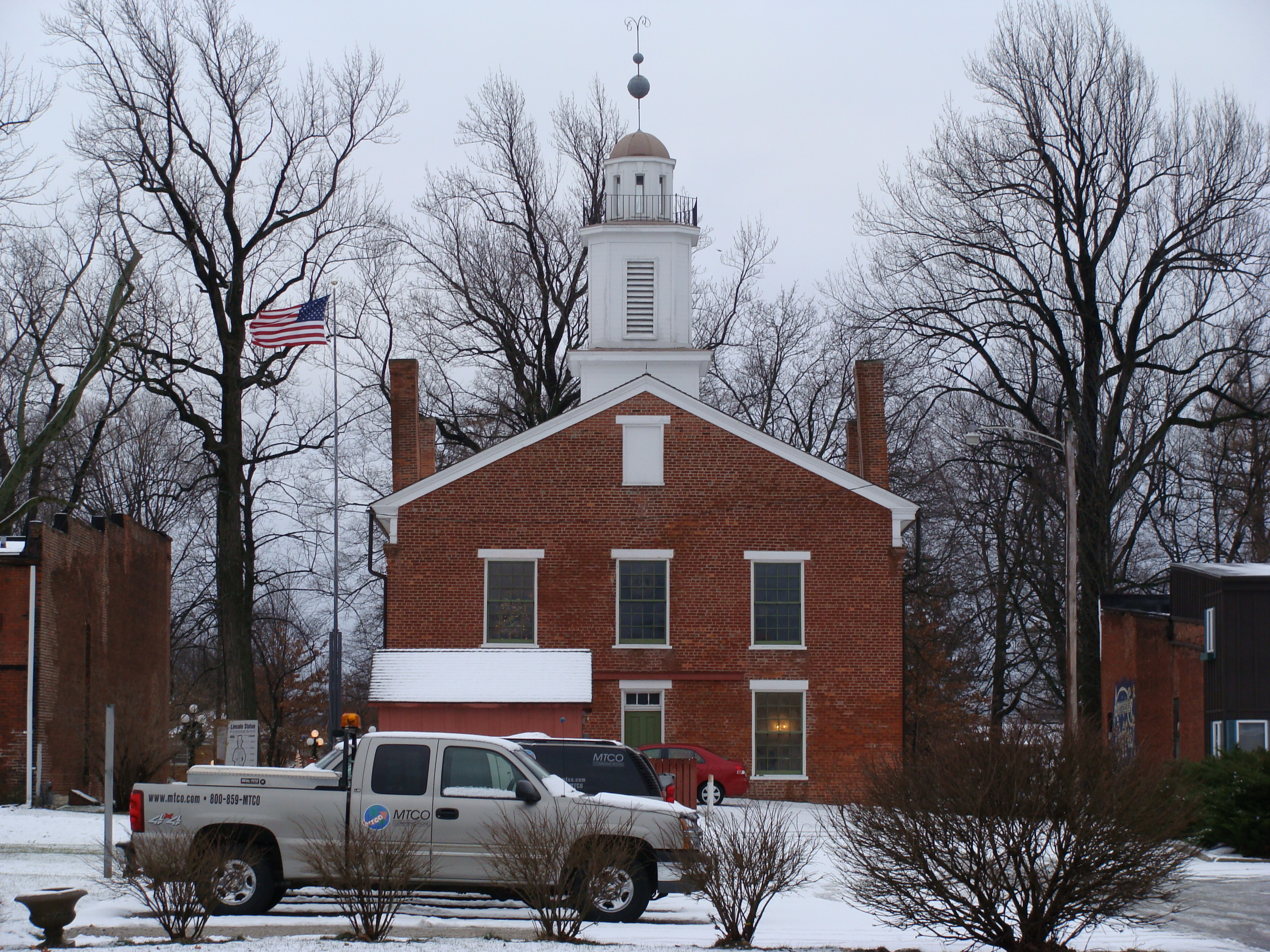
- Metamora Courthouse State Historic Site

- Location within the U.S. state of Illinois
- Coordinates: 40°47′N 89°13′W
- Country: United States
- State: Illinois
- Founded: February 1841
- Named for: Woodford County, Kentucky
- Seat: Eureka
- Largest city: Eureka

Area
  - Total: 543 sq mi (1,410 km^{2})
  - Land: 528 sq mi (1,370 km^{2})
  - Water: 15 sq mi (39 km^{2}) 2.7%

Population (2020)
  - Total: 38,467
  - Estimate (2025): 38,111 ▼
  - Density: 72.9/sq mi (28.1/km^{2})
- Time zone: UTC−6 (Central)
  - Summer (DST): UTC−5 (CDT)
- Congressional district: 16th
- Website: www.woodford-county.org

Woodford County is a county located in the state of Illinois. The 2020 United States census listed its population at 38,467. Its county seat is Eureka. Woodford County is part of the Peoria metropolitan area. Its name comes from General William Woodford, an officer of the American Revolutionary War who served at the brutal military encampment at Valley Forge, Pennsylvania.

== History ==
=== Establishment ===
Woodford County is part of what was formerly the homelands of several Native American peoples, including the Potawatomi, the Meskwaki, and the Sauk peoples. It was located just south of the land of the Illiniwek. The western portion of the county in particular shows much archeological evidence of having supported extensive First Nations populations.

At the time of the American Revolutionary War, three competing American colonies – Massachusetts, Virginia, and Connecticut – claimed part of what is today the state of Illinois. The matter was solved in 1778 when Virginia amalgamated lands in the region into a massive county called Illinois, borrowing the name of a native people. Indiana Territory was formed in 1800 with William Henry Harrison as Governor; the future Illinois was part of this territory. It was not until 1809 that Illinois Territory was formally established as an official territory of the United States of America. Statehood followed in December 1818.

The first organized Anglo settlements in the future Woodford County region appeared in the 1820s. First settlement in the county came at Spring Bay, with pioneers managing to select the same ground occupied by an ancient Indian burial site which ran north-and-south through the entire settlement. The location was chosen due to its proximity to the Illinois River.

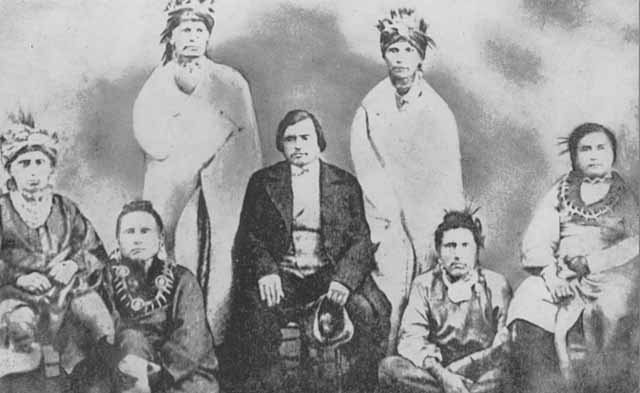
The Meskwaki (Fox) were pushed from their historic homelands to Iowa and Indian Territory (part of today's Oklahoma).

In the 1870s, an early historian of Woodford County wrote:

There were a few Indians in the county at the time of settlement by the whites, but the two races did not come into conflict to any extent. The advancing wave of civilization seemed to follow up the retreating wave of barbarism. The first settlers encountered a few Indians ... and in 1832 were involved to some extent in the Black Hawk War, but the active operations were further north than Woodford County.

The current boundaries of the county were not those originally drawn; moreover, the names of various counties in the region changed frequently The Eastern portion of Woodford County was known as Edwards (1814–16), Crawford (1816–19), Clark (1819–21), and Fayette (1821-25) Counties, while the Western part of today's county was included in Madison (1814–17), Bond (1817–21), and Sangamon (1821–25) Counties.

In 1827 new lines were drawn and Tazewell County was established, including all of today's Woodford County. Settlers began arriving from neighboring territories during the early 1830s. This led to the formal creation of Woodford County along its current boundaries in February 1841 from a portion of Tazewell County and a portion of McLean County that had been part of Tazewell County before 1830.

The county was named for Woodford County, Kentucky, which was in turn named after General William Woodford, who served with General George Washington at Valley Forge, Pennsylvania during the brutal winter of 1777–78.

The first post office in today's Woodford County was established in 1836 at Partridge township, named for local tribal leader Black Partridge. Also in 1836, the area's first (private) school was founded, by Miss Betsy Page. The first public school followed shortly thereafter. The first Sunday school was established in 1837 in the home of Parker Morse in Cazenovia.

=== Pioneer life ===
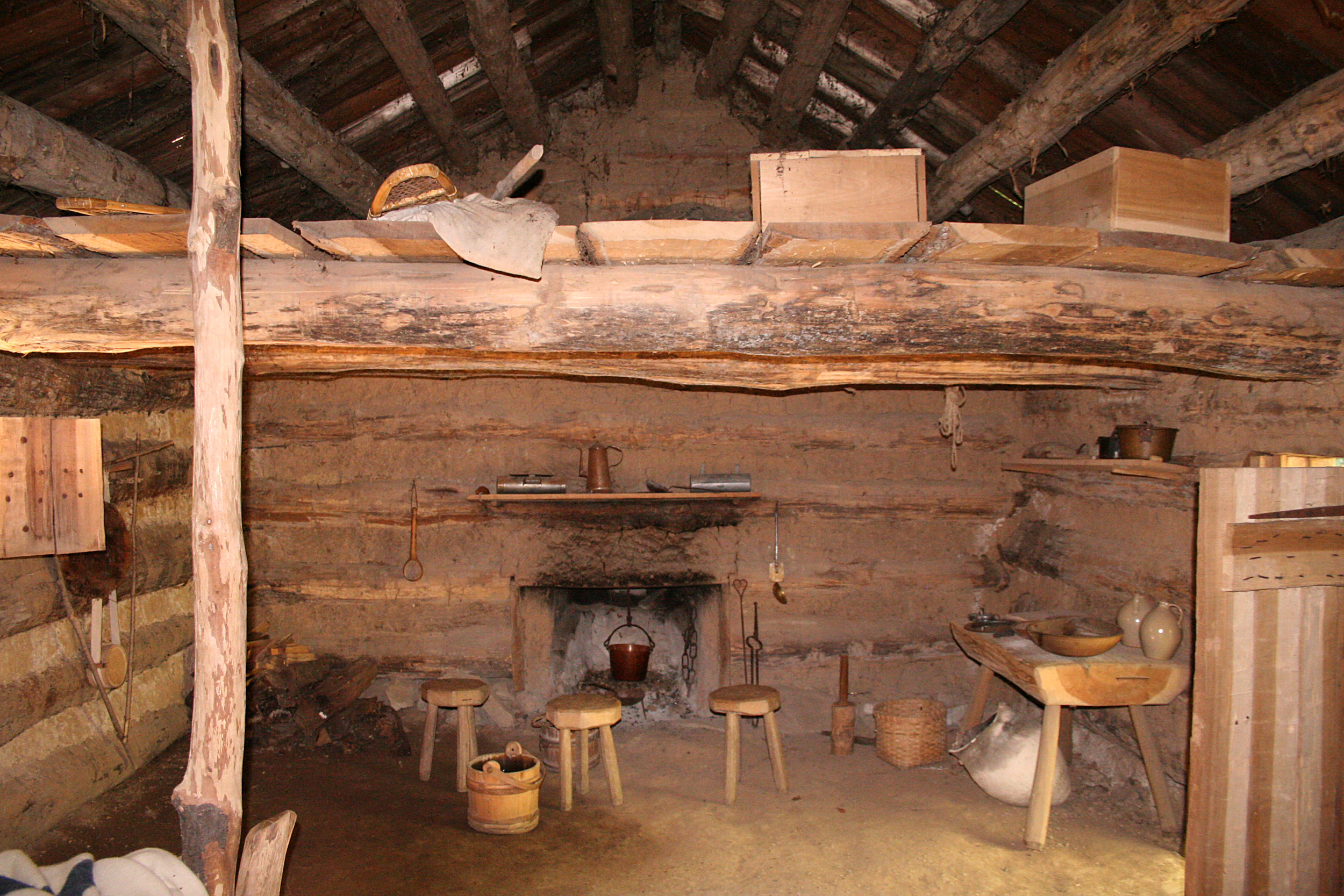
Interior of a replica 1836 prairie log cabin, in Fishers, Indiana

The first settlers of Woodford County occupied crude log cabins. Windows were covered with oiled papers; doors and floors were constructed of rough boards split from trees and held together with wooden pegs. Construction of the cabins was primitive, with the floor plan generally involving a single room heated with a fireplace.

Meat was frequently roasted on a spit; cornbread was generally baked on the fireplace coals. A common staple of pioneer life was waffles, baked from batter in a folding iron mold three or four feet long. Modern canning processes were unknown and the wintertime larder consisted primarily of bread and meat. Vegetables were consumed seasonally, with pumpkin, red peppers, corn, and venison dried for later use.

Clothing was made at home, generally of linen made from homegrown flax. In addition, other heavier compound fabrics known as "linsey," made of linen or cotton with woolen filling, and "jeans," made of an even heavier material and dyed brown with walnut bark, were also used.

Prior to 1831 all preparation of wool had to be done by hand at home, with the raw fiber "carded" between pairs of thin, metal spiked boards about 4 inches wide and a foot long. The resulting rolls of wool were then spun into thread upon a spinning wheel and thereby prepared for the loom.

A sexual division of labor was practiced, with women engaged in home manufactures and food preparation while men were occupied with agriculture, hunting, and construction. Since a great percentage of the land of Woodford County was tillable, farming was the principal occupation of the early settlers. Plowing was by means of wooden plows with iron shares; corn was planted by hand and covered using a hoe. Hay, often using wild rather than cultivated grass, was cut with a scythe and taken up with rakes and pitchforks.

With the advent of timber milling in the area, frame houses became possible. Settlers cooperated in construction, helping one another raise houses and barns. The latter could be 30 feet in length and width with walls perhaps 16 feet high. "It was heavy and dangerous work, and the raising of a large barn required the united energies of a whole community," one settler recalled. Other buildings commonly constructed included stables, corn-cribs, smokehouses, and ash-hoppers. Plank fences began to appear in the 1850s.

Governance by the early settlers was not by secret ballot, but by voice vote.

=== Antebellum years ===
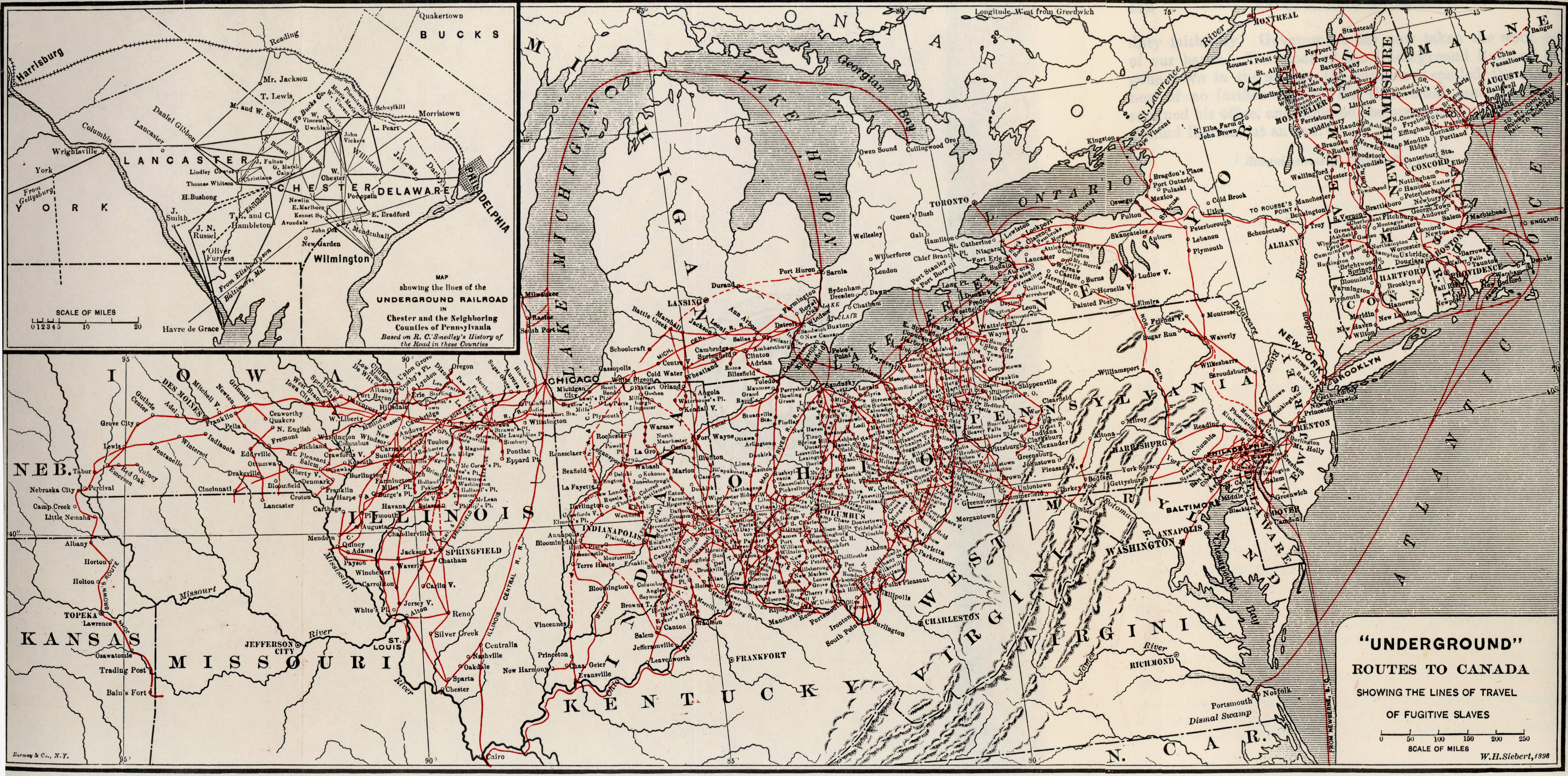
Various routes of the Underground Railroad aiding the escape of slaves to Canada. One branch ran through Woodford County.

By 1850, Woodford County was well settled; county's population topped the 5,000 mark. Illinois settlers were overwhelmingly opposed to the institution of slavery, and with the passage of the Fugitive Slave Act of 1850, popular discontent grew and opponents began to engage in acts of resistance, hiding escaped slaves seeking escape to Canada. One branch of the so-called Underground Railroad along which escaped slaves furtively avoided their potential captors ran directly through Woodford County.

The "stations" of the Underground Railroad were generally residences where escaping slaves could hide from their pursuers. These stations were located at convenient distances so that those escaping (and their "conductor" guides) could travel from one to the next in a single night.

The journey was dangerous. Wanted posters offering rewards of $50, $100, and sometimes more for specific runaway slaves were placed by slaveowners, attracting bounty hunters. Moreover, those assisting escaping slaves were themselves violators of the Fugitive Slave Law, subject to prosecution and punishment.

Local historian Roy L. Moore wrote:

There was bitter opposition to the enforcement of the fugitive slave law. This condition was not surprising, since the county had men who were strong opponents of slavery and likewise men who would make any sacrifice to have the institution stamped out. Over this branch of the underground road many a runaway slave passed on his way to freedom. There was such a strong sentiment against the [slave] traffic that conductors and stations were found in sufficient number to carry on the work successfully.

Church deacons named Mr. Dutton and Parker Morse were credited by Moore as leaders of the local anti-slavery effort. Despite the fact that these and other active conductors in the Underground Railroad were known to the community, popular sentiment against slavery was such that there was "very little molestation for a long time" in Woodford County. Only one instance of an arrest of a Woodford County conductor is recorded by Roy Moore in his 1910 history, and that ultimately resulted in the quashing of the indictment.

=== Early administrative structure ===
This 1878 map shows the township structure of Woodford County.

When it was first established in 1841, the county seat of Woodford County was placed in Versailles for a temporary two-year interval. Competition for the honor (and related business opportunities) was fierce leading up to the June 1843 decision of the county commissioners to tap Metamora (then known as Hanover) as the new seat. A county courthouse was begun in Metamora in 1844 and a county jail in March 1852.

It was during the pre-Civil War years that Woodford County adopted townships – which was met with strong opposition. No fewer than four public elections were held between 1850 and 1854 before the township system gained a majority of votes.

Following the division of the county into townships in early 1855, the system of county government was likewise altered, with a county commission giving way to a board of supervisors. Early county officers, including the sheriff, coroner, school commissioner, surveyor, and treasurer were elected to two-year terms of office, later changed to four-year terms.

Other claimants arose attempting to wrest the county seat from Metamora, including Eureka, El Paso, and Roanoke. El Paso was nearly awarded the seat in 1867, when it sent a local attorney to make an offer of $30,000 to the town of Metamora to relinquish the county seat. A closely contested vote ended with the apparent result in favor of El Paso reversed by a bare 10 votes in a recount.

Another vote in 1869 rejected an appeal to move the county seat to Eureka. A dubious recount in a third election held in November 1873 again overturned an apparent result to move the Woodford County seat to Roanoke. A fourth election in 1884, again proposing relocation to Roanoke, failed miserably. It was only in 1894 when a final election provided a decisive majority in favor of moving the county seat to Eureka that Metamora lost its status as county seat.

An impressive new courthouse building was quickly constructed in Eureka, cementing that town's status as legal and governmental center of Woodford County.

=== Civil War years ===
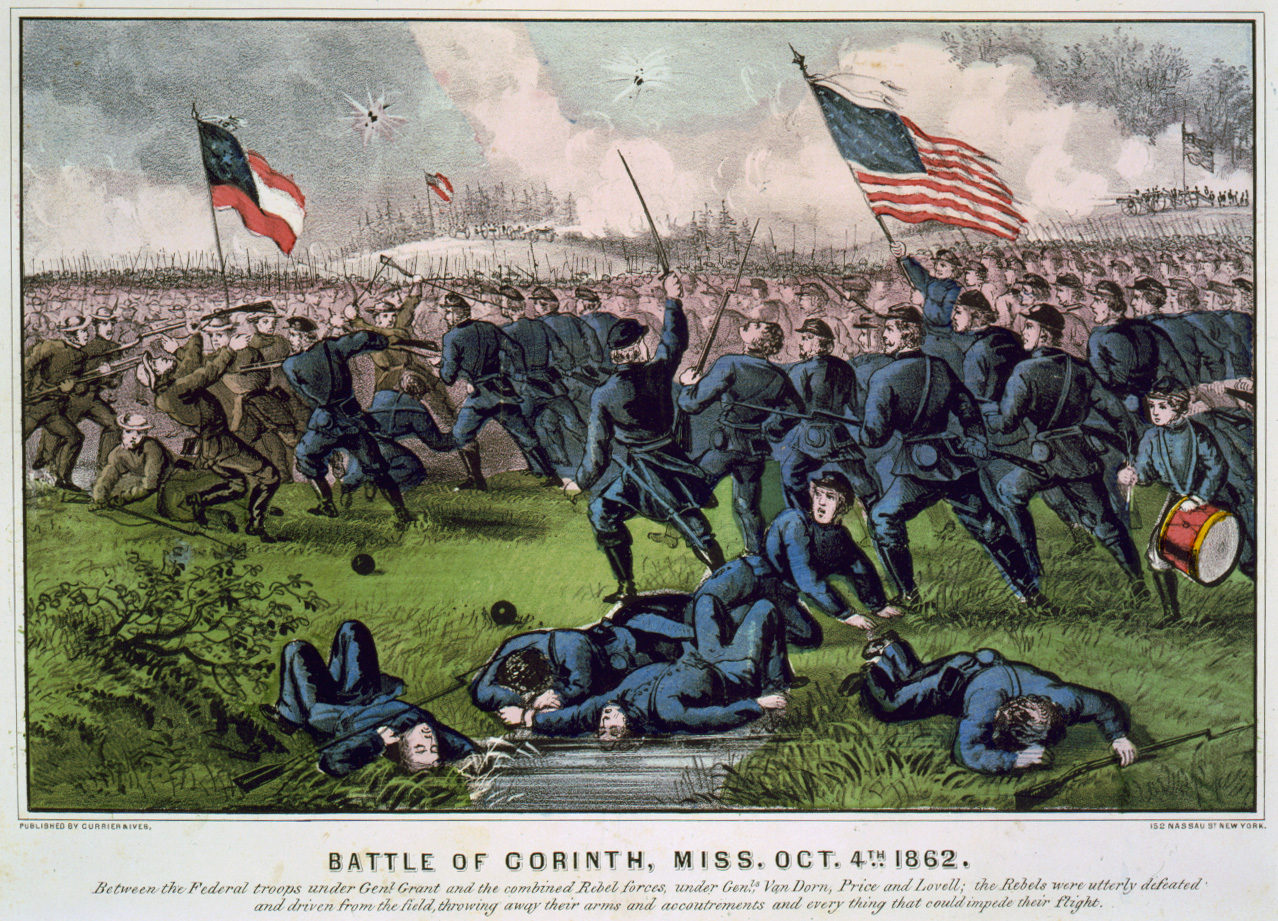
Fanciful rendition of the October 1862 Battle of Corinth, Mississippi by lithographers Currier and Ives. Woodford County members of the 47th Illinois Volunteers were part of the fighting, which resulted in combined losses of 828 killed and more than 3,800 wounded and missing.

Woodford County's population continued to swell, standing at 13,281 when the American Civil War started in 1861. Support for the Union Cause was strong throughout the county; by war's end 1,643 county residents had enlisted in the Union forces – 12.4% of the population.

Calls for troops were translated into state quotas, which in Illinois was customarily apportioned to the various counties according to their population. Enlistment bonuses were paid. After 1862 when the number of volunteers ultimately failed to fulfill a state's enlistment quota, a draft was begun. Substitutes for those drafted could be sent, with prices paid by the draftee to his substitute generally ranging of $500 to $600, although prices of up to $1,000 were reportedly paid.

Woodford County's volunteers – and later on conscripts – were dispersed among a wide range of units, making a universal summary of their wartime experience impossible. Some units composed largely of residents of Woodford County, including Company G of the 17th Illinois Volunteer Infantry Regiment, mustered at Peoria May 25, 1861, and fought at the Battle of Shiloh in Hardin County, Tennessee in April 1862. Several Woodford County men were among the 130 members of the 17th Infantry killed and wounded in the two-day battle. This unit also participated in the last phase of the 1863 Siege of Vicksburg in Warren County, Mississippi, a protracted battle which led to the surrender of over 29,000 Confederate troops.

Another unit containing numerous Woodford County men was the 47th Illinois Volunteer Infantry Regiment, especially Companies B and I. Mustered into service at Peoria on August 16, 1861, the unit lost 30 killed and 100 wounded in the Battle of Corinth, Mississippi, in October 1862. The unit also suffered casualties in a May 1863 charge during the Vicksburg Campaign. After the fall of Vicksburg in July 1863, the unit spent the duration guarding railroad lines, being discharged in October of that year.

The 77th Illinois Volunteer Infantry Regiment, Companies C, F and H, also had a substantial Woodford County contingent. Serving under Maj. Gen. Gordon Granger, they participated in the initial phase of the Vicksburg Campaign. The 77th then participated in the Battle of Jackson, Mississippi (May 1863), and taking the city. Disaster struck in April 1864 near Alexandria, Louisiana, when the unit was isolated and crushed in a cavalry support operation at the Battle of Sabine Cross-roads. 176 men of the 77th Illinois were killed, wounded, or captured, leaving only 125 members of the regiment fit for duty. The unit was mustered out in July 1865, having participated in 16 battles.

Woodford County men served in numbers in Company A, 86th Illinois Volunteer Infantry Regiment, suffering losses in Kentucky at the Battle of Perryville in October 1862, and participating in Sherman's March to the Sea. Others were concentrated in Companies D and E of the 108th Illinois Volunteer Infantry Regiment, in which 205 of the 214 fatalities suffered by the regiment were due to disease rather than combat, 134 of whom died in February and March 1863 alone.

=== Eureka College ===
Eureka College began as a one-room schoolhouse in 1848, when the town was known as Walnut Grove.

A leading community institution of Woodford County for more than 150 years is Eureka College, a liberal arts school affiliated with the Christian Church (Disciples of Christ). Its most noted alumnus is US President Ronald Reagan.

Eureka College traces its roots back to the summer of 1848, when a young collegian named A.S. Fisher appeared in Walnut Grove (original name of Eureka) and expressed his interest in conducting a school that would teach language, science, mathematics, and philosophy. Fisher was employed to teach school for ten months, with a number of local worthies, including many active in the Church of Christ, guaranteeing payment of his salary. This school was formally launched in September 1848. Owing to the presence of a charismatic local religious leader, the Church of Christ showed great growth during this period, adding 100 adherents in 1848, with other supporters in neighboring counties. Demand grew for transformation of the school into a seminary with room and board for students from other localities, with instructional costs to be covered through collection of tuition. In September 1849, the school was rechristened Walnut Grove Seminary and relaunched with A.S. Fisher as principal, assisted by a young woman "of superior ability and tact as a teacher." Fisher would ultimately spend 38 years associated with the college which would emerge.

In December 1849 the school was incorporated as Walnut Grove Academy. Money was collected for an expansion of the facility and a new two-story building constructed. The enterprise continued to expand and planning began for expansion of the academy into a college, with necessary buildings and a library. Appeals were made to the state Missionary Convention of the Church of Christ in 1851 and enthusiasm for establishment of a college within the church laity grew.

== Geography ==
According to the US Census Bureau, the county has a total area of 543 square miles (1,410 km^{2}), of which 528 square miles (1,370 km^{2}) is land and 15 square miles (39 km^{2}) (2.7%) is water. Most of the area is prairie land, with some bluffs originally covered with timber.

=== Climate and weather ===
Eureka, Illinois

Climate chart (precipitation, max. and min. temperature)
J	F	M	A	M	J	J	A	S	O	N	D
1.8 30 13	1.8 36 18	3.2 48 29	3.5 62 38	4.2 73 49	3.7 83 58	3.8 86 62	3.4 84 60	3.3 78 52	2.8 66 41	3.3 49 30	2.4 35 19
- █ Average max. and min. temperatures in °F
- █ Precipitation totals in inches
- Source: The Weather Channel
Metric conversion
J	F	M	A	M	J	J	A	S	O	N	D
44 −1 −11	46 2 −8	82 9 −2	90 17 3	107 23 9	94 28 14	96 30 17	87 29 16	85 26 11	71 19 5	83 9 −1	61 2 −7
- █ Average max. and min. temperatures in °C
- █ Precipitation totals in mm

In recent years, average temperatures in the county seat of Eureka have ranged from a low of 13 °F (−11 °C) in January to a high of 86 °F (30 °C) in July, although a record low of −28 °F (−33 °C) was recorded in February 1905 and a record high of 111 °F (44 °C) was recorded in July 1936. Average monthly precipitation ranged from 1.75 inches (44 mm) in January to 4.20 inches (107 mm) in May.

=== Major highways ===
- Interstate 39
- Interstate 74
- U.S. Highway 24
- U.S. Highway 51
- U.S. Highway 150
- Illinois Route 26
- Illinois Route 89
- Illinois Route 116
- Illinois Route 117
- Illinois Route 251

=== Adjacent counties ===
- Marshall County (north)
- LaSalle County (northeast)
- Livingston County (east)
- McLean County (southeast)
- Tazewell County (southwest)
- Peoria County (west)

== Demographics ==
Historical population
Census	Pop.	Note	%±
1850	4,415		—
1860	13,282		200.8%
1870	18,956		42.7%
1880	21,620		14.1%
1890	21,429		−0.9%
1900	21,822		1.8%
1910	20,506		−6.0%
1920	19,340		−5.7%
1930	18,792		−2.8%
1940	19,124		1.8%
1950	21,335		11.6%
1960	24,579		15.2%
1970	28,012		14.0%
1980	33,320		18.9%
1990	32,653		−2.0%
2000	35,469		8.6%
2010	38,664		9.0%
2020	38,467		−0.5%
2025 (est.)	38,111	▼	−0.9%
US Decennial Census; 1790-1960 1900-1990; 1990-2000 2010-2013

=== 2020 census ===
As of the 2020 census, the county had a population of 38,467. The median age was 41.1 years, 24.6% of residents were under the age of 18, and 19.4% of residents were 65 years of age or older. For every 100 females there were 99.8 males, and for every 100 females age 18 and over there were 97.4 males age 18 and over.

The racial makeup of the county was 93.9% White, 0.7% Black or African American, 0.1% American Indian and Alaska Native, 0.6% Asian, <0.1% Native Hawaiian and Pacific Islander, 0.6% from some other race, and 4.1% from two or more races. Hispanic or Latino residents of any race comprised 1.9% of the population.

29.8% of residents lived in urban areas, while 70.2% lived in rural areas.

There were 14,616 households in the county, of which 31.7% had children under the age of 18 living in them. Of all households, 60.8% were married-couple households, 15.0% were households with a male householder and no spouse or partner present, and 19.5% were households with a female householder and no spouse or partner present. About 23.5% of all households were made up of individuals and 11.6% had someone living alone who was 65 years of age or older.

There were 15,704 housing units, of which 6.9% were vacant. Among occupied housing units, 82.9% were owner-occupied and 17.1% were renter-occupied. The homeowner vacancy rate was 1.7% and the rental vacancy rate was 8.2%.

=== Racial and ethnic composition ===
Woodford County, Illinois – Racial and ethnic composition Note: the US Census treats Hispanic/Latino as an ethnic category. This table excludes Latinos from the racial categories and assigns them to a separate category. Hispanics/Latinos may be of any race.
Race / Ethnicity (NH = Non-Hispanic)	Pop 1980	Pop 1990	Pop 2000	Pop 2010	Pop 2020	% 1980	% 1990	% 2000	% 2010	% 2020
White alone (NH)	33,000	32,227	34,760	37,294	35,844	99.04%	98.70%	98.00%	96.46%	93.18%
Black or African American alone (NH)	90	61	84	186	269	0.27%	0.19%	0.24%	0.48%	0.70%
Native American or Alaska Native alone (NH)	27	47	58	65	42	0.08%	0.14%	0.16%	0.17%	0.11%
Asian alone (NH)	67	95	108	208	217	0.20%	0.29%	0.30%	0.54%	0.56%
Native Hawaiian or Pacific Islander alone (NH)	x	x	1	5	10	x	x	0.00%	0.01%	0.03%
Other race alone (NH)	17	2	6	13	89	0.05%	0.01%	0.02%	0.03%	0.23%
Mixed race or Multiracial (NH)	x	x	211	366	1,256	x	x	0.59%	0.95%	3.27%
Hispanic or Latino (any race)	119	221	241	527	740	0.36%	0.68%	0.68%	1.36%	1.92%
Total	33,320	32,653	35,469	38,664	38,467	100.00%	100.00%	100.00%	100.00%	100.00%

=== 2010 census ===
As of the 2010 United States census, there were 38,664 people, 14,276 households, and 10,675 families residing in the county. The population density was 73.3 inhabitants per square mile (28.3/km^{2}). There were 15,145 housing units at an average density of 28.7 per square mile (11.1/km^{2}). The racial makeup of the county was 97.4% White, 0.6% Asian, 0.5% Black or African American, 0.2% American Indian, 0.3% from other races, and 1.1% from two or more races. Those of Hispanic or Latino origin made up 1.4% of the population. In terms of ancestry, 48.7% were German, 14.1% were Irish, 10.9% were English, and 8.8% were American.

Of the 14,276 households, 34.8% had children under the age of 18 living with them, 63.7% were married couples living together, 7.5% had a female householder with no husband present, 25.2% were non-families, and 21.8% of all households were made up of individuals. The average household size was 2.64 and the average family size was 3.07. The median age was 39.6 years.

The median income for a household in the county was $65,890 and the median income for a family was $75,601. Males had a median income of $55,297 versus $35,435 for females. The per capita income for the county was $29,475. About 4.9% of families and 7.0% of the population were below the poverty line, including 10.6% of those under age 18 and 6.3% of those age 65 or over.

== Governance ==
Woodford County is governed by a 15-member elected County Board, each member serving a 4-year term. Board members appoint one member to act as chair at two-year intervals. The County Board provides governing ordinances for Woodford County, establishes a budget, levies taxes, and promulgates policies and regulations for the management of government operations. The County Board holds monthly meetings. It also selects five standing committees, each with five members, which meet monthly.

The 15 members of the board are elected from three electoral districts, each electing five board members. District 1 includes Clayton, Greene, El Paso, Kansas, Linn, Minonk, Roanoke, Palestine, and Panola Townships; District 2 includes Cazenovia, Partridge, Spring Bay, and Worth Townships; and District 3 includes Cruger, Metamora, Montgomery, and Olio Townships.

== Education ==
=== K-12 education ===
K-12 school districts include:

- Deer Creek-Mackinaw Community Unit School District 701
- El Paso-Gridley Community Unit School District 11
- Eureka Community Unit District 140
- Fieldcrest Community Unit School District 6
- Lowpoint-Washburn Community Unit School District 21
- McLean County Unit School District 5
- Olympia Community Unit School District 16
- Roanoke-Benson Community Unit School District 60

Secondary school districts:

- Metamora Township High School District 122

Elementary school districts:

- Germantown Hills School District 69
- Metamora Community Consolidated School District 1
- Riverview Consolidated Community School District 2

High schools

- El Paso-Gridley High School (El Paso)
- Eureka High School (Eureka)
- Fieldcrest High School (Minonk)
- Lowpoint-Washburn High School (Washburn)
- Metamora Township High School (Metamora)
- Roanoke-Benson High School (Roanoke)

Since 1949 Eureka has been a part of the Congerville-Eureka-Goodfield Community Unit School District 140. The district's coverage area totals 113 square miles. El Paso is part of the El Paso-Gridley Community Unit School District 11.

== Politics ==
Woodford County is among the most solidly Republican counties in Illinois when it comes to presidential elections. The last Republican to receive less than 50% of the county's vote was George H. W. Bush in 1992 who still won the county. In 1964, Barry Goldwater won the county despite losing the state by nearly 19%.

United States presidential election results for Woodford County, Illinois
Year	Republican		Democratic		Third party(ies)	
Year	No.	%	No.	%	No.	%
1892	1,738	37.55%	2,601	56.20%	289	6.24%
1896	2,447	48.76%	2,453	48.88%	118	2.35%
1900	2,421	46.63%	2,564	49.38%	207	3.99%
1904	2,371	51.19%	1,908	41.19%	353	7.62%
1908	2,204	47.53%	2,156	46.50%	277	5.97%
1912	1,495	32.84%	2,051	45.06%	1,006	22.10%
1916	4,273	52.22%	3,619	44.23%	290	3.54%
1920	4,929	69.06%	1,977	27.70%	231	3.24%
1924	4,290	57.48%	1,828	24.49%	1,346	18.03%
1928	5,140	60.30%	3,311	38.84%	73	0.86%
1932	3,866	42.06%	5,244	57.05%	82	0.89%
1936	4,845	48.00%	5,122	50.75%	126	1.25%
1940	6,575	60.09%	4,314	39.43%	53	0.48%
1944	6,237	63.73%	3,514	35.90%	36	0.37%
1948	5,784	62.35%	3,446	37.15%	46	0.50%
1952	8,022	70.94%	3,273	28.94%	13	0.11%
1956	8,505	72.18%	3,257	27.64%	21	0.18%
1960	8,101	64.76%	4,401	35.18%	7	0.06%
1964	6,248	51.37%	5,914	48.63%	0	0.00%
1968	7,876	61.79%	4,005	31.42%	866	6.79%
1972	9,622	72.88%	3,558	26.95%	23	0.17%
1976	8,899	64.00%	4,819	34.66%	186	1.34%
1980	10,791	70.68%	3,552	23.26%	925	6.06%
1984	10,758	70.44%	4,425	28.97%	89	0.58%
1988	9,474	66.93%	4,604	32.53%	77	0.54%
1992	8,032	49.26%	5,490	33.67%	2,783	17.07%
1996	8,527	56.68%	5,270	35.03%	1,246	8.28%
2000	10,905	64.94%	5,529	32.92%	359	2.14%
2004	12,698	67.54%	6,005	31.94%	99	0.53%
2008	12,191	62.39%	6,999	35.82%	350	1.79%
2012	12,961	68.44%	5,572	29.42%	405	2.14%
2016	13,207	66.49%	5,092	25.63%	1,565	7.88%
2020	14,799	68.83%	6,160	28.65%	543	2.53%
2024	14,837	69.79%	5,958	28.03%	463	2.18%

== Media ==
Early Woodford County was served by a variety of newspapers. Probably the first was the Woodford County Times (1854). By 1880 there were five weekly papers in the county: Woodford Sentinel, El Paso Journal, Eureka Journal, Minonk Blade, Washburn News. The Eureka College also produced a monthly periodical, the Eureka College Messenger.

== Notable people of Woodford County ==
- Donald Attig (b. 1936), boat designer and yachtsman, graduated from Eureka College
- Emik Avakian (1923-2013), inventor and owner of numerous patents, graduated from Eureka College in 1948
- Emma Smith DeVoe (1848-1927), suffragist and political activist, taught at Eureka College
- J. Frank Duryea (1869-1967), a co-inventor of the gas-powered automobile, born in Washburn
- Frank Frantz (1872-1941), Rough Rider and the final Governor of Oklahoma Territory, attended Eureka College for two years in the 1880s
- Glen Gray (1900-1963), jazz saxophonist and orchestra leader, born in Roanoke, graduated from Roanoke High School (1917)0
- Oliver Perry Hay (1846-1930), professor and expert on vertebrate paleontology, graduated from Eureka College (1870).
- John S. Kyser (1900-1975), President of Northwestern State University from 1954 to 1967, born in El Paso
- Dan McCoy (b. 1978), comedian and television writer, graduate of Eureka High School (1996)
- Ralph "Mac" McKinzie (1894-1990) coached football at Eureka College for 17 seasons
- Mary Frances Winston Newson (1869-1959), mathematician and academic, taught at Eureka College
- William A. Poynter (1848-1909), 10th governor of Nebraska, born in Eureka, graduated from Eureka College (1867)
- Neil Reagan (1908-1996), advertising executive and brother of Ronald Reagan, graduated from Eureka College (1933)
- Ronald Reagan (1911-2004), 40th President of the United States, graduated from Eureka College (1932)
- Junius P. Rodriguez (b. 1957), historian, Eureka College professor (1992– )
- Fulton J. Sheen (1895-1979), Beatified Catholic archbishop and televangelist, born in El Paso
- Andy Studebaker (b. 1985) NFL linebacker for the Indianapolis Colts, Eureka High School graduate (2004)
- Caleb TerBush (b. 1990), collegiate football quarterback at Purdue University, Metamora Township High School graduate
- Ben Zobrist (b. 1981), All-Star Major League Baseball infielder for the Oakland Athletics, born and raised in Eureka

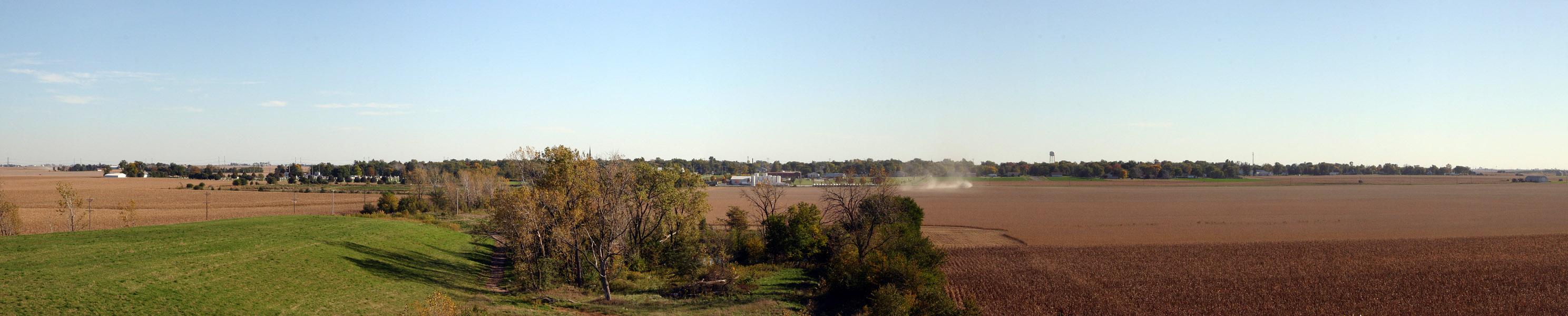
Panoramic view of the town of Minonk as seen from the north during the fall of 2006.

== Townships ==
- Cazenovia Township
- Clayton Township
- Cruger Township
- El Paso Township
- Greene Township
- Kansas Township
- Linn Township
- Metamora Township
- Minonk Township
- Montgomery Township
- Olio Township
- Palestine Township
- Panola Township
- Partridge Township
- Roanoke Township
- Spring Bay Township
- Worth Township

== Communities ==
=== Cities ===
- El Paso (partly in McLean County)
- Eureka (Seat)
- Minonk

=== Villages ===
- Bay View Gardens
- Benson
- Congerville
- Deer Creek (partly in Tazewell County)
- Germantown Hills
- Goodfield (partly in Tazewell County)
- Kappa
- Metamora
- Panola
- Peoria Heights (mostly in Peoria County)
- Roanoke
- Secor
- Spring Bay
- Washburn (partly in Marshall County)

=== Census-designated place ===
- Lowpoint

=== Unincorporated communities ===
- Cazenovia
- Cruger

== See also ==
- National Register of Historic Places listings in Woodford County, Illinois
