= Worth Township, Woodford County, Illinois =

Coordinates: 40°47′09″N 89°27′16″W

Worth Township
- Township
- Location in Woodford County
- Country: United States
- State: Illinois
- County: Woodford
- Established: November 7, 1854

Area
  - Total: 36.24 sq mi (93.9 km^{2})
  - Land: 36.19 sq mi (93.7 km^{2})
  - Water: 0.05 sq mi (0.13 km^{2}) 0.14%

Population (2010)
  - Estimate (2016): 8,946
  - Density: 241.5/sq mi (93.2/km^{2})
- Time zone: UTC-6 (CST)
  - Summer (DST): UTC-5 (CDT)
- FIPS code: 17-203-83544

Worth Township is located in Woodford County, Illinois. As of the 2010 census, its population was 8,741 and it contained 3,212 housing units.

The largest named community in Worth Township is the village of Germantown Hills.

== Geography ==
According to the 2010 census, the township has a total area of 36.24 square miles (93.9 km^{2}), of which 36.19 square miles (93.7 km^{2}) (or 99.86%) is land and 0.05 square miles (0.13 km^{2}) (or 0.14%) is water.

== Demographics ==
Historical population
Census	Pop.	Note	%±
2016 (est.)	8,946
U.S. Decennial Census
