= Lowpoint, Illinois =

- Unincorporated community
- Location within Illinois Location within the United States
- Coordinates: 40°52′26″N 89°18′50″W
- Country: United States
- State: Illinois
- County: Woodford

Area
  - Total: 0.23 sq mi (0.59 km^{2})
  - Land: 0.23 sq mi (0.59 km^{2})
  - Water: 0 sq mi (0.00 km^{2})
- Elevation: 722 ft (220 m)

Population (2020)
  - Total: 148
  - Density: 652.3/sq mi (251.85/km^{2})
- Time zone: UTC-6 (Central (CST))
  - Summer (DST): UTC-5 (CDT)
- ZIP code: 61545
- Area code: 309
- GNIS feature ID: 2804103

Lowpoint is an unincorporated community in Woodford County, Illinois, United States. As of the 2020 census, Lowpoint had a population of 148. Lowpoint is located along Illinois Route 89, south-southwest of Washburn. Lowpoint has a post office with ZIP code 61545.

== History ==
In 1895, Frank D. Banta was commissioned postmaster. At this time the spelling of the name changed from Low Point to Lowpoint, to avoid confusion with the community of Long Point, about 40 miles northeast of Lowpoint.

== Demographics ==
Historical population
| Census | Pop. | Note | %± |
|---|---|---|---|
| 2020 | 148 | | — |
U.S. Decennial Census

Lowpoint first appeared as a census designated place in the 2020 U.S. census.
