= Partridge Township, Illinois =

Coordinates: 40°52′55″N 89°26′53″W

Partridge Township
- Township
- Location in Woodford County
- Country: United States
- State: Illinois
- County: Woodford
- Established: November 7, 1854

Area
  - Total: 33.71 sq mi (87.3 km^{2})
  - Land: 26.21 sq mi (67.9 km^{2})
  - Water: 7.5 sq mi (19 km^{2}) 22.25%

Population (2010)
  - Estimate (2016): 602
  - Density: 22.6/sq mi (8.7/km^{2})
- Time zone: UTC-6 (CST)
  - Summer (DST): UTC-5 (CDT)
- FIPS code: 17-203-58018

Partridge Township is located in Woodford County, Illinois. As of the 2010 census, its population was 593 and it contained 243 housing units.

== Geography ==
According to the 2010 census, the township has a total area of 33.71 square miles (87.3 km^{2}), of which 26.21 square miles (67.9 km^{2}) (or 77.75%) is land and 7.5 square miles (19 km^{2}) (or 22.25%) is water.

== Demographics ==
Historical population
Census	Pop.	Note	%±
2016 (est.)	602
U.S. Decennial Census
