= Olio Township, Illinois =

Coordinates: 40°42′18″N 89°13′30″W

Olio Township
- Township
- Location in Woodford County
- Country: United States
- State: Illinois
- County: Woodford
- Established: November 7, 1854

Area
  - Total: 31.45 sq mi (81.5 km^{2})
  - Land: 31.41 sq mi (81.4 km^{2})
  - Water: 0.03 sq mi (0.078 km^{2}) 0.10%

Population (2010)
  - Estimate (2016): 4,980
  - Density: 157/sq mi (61/km^{2})
- Time zone: UTC-6 (CST)
  - Summer (DST): UTC-5 (CDT)
- FIPS code: 17-203-55821

Olio Township is located in Woodford County, Illinois. As of the 2010 census, its population was 4,931 and it contained 1,879 housing units.

The largest named community in Olio Township is the city of Eureka, the Woodford County seat.

== Geography ==
According to the 2010 census, the township has a total area of 31.45 square miles (81.5 km^{2}), of which 31.41 square miles (81.4 km^{2}) (or 99.87%) is land and 0.03 square miles (0.078 km^{2}) (or 0.10%) is water.

== Demographics ==
Historical population
Census	Pop.	Note	%±
2016 (est.)	4,980
U.S. Decennial Census
