= El Paso-Gridley Community Unit School District 11 =

Public school district in Central Illinois, USA

Address
- 97 West 5th Street El Paso, Illinois, 61738; United States

District information
- Type: Public
- Grades: PreK–12
- NCES District ID: 1700326

Students and staff
- Students: 1,176

Other information
- Website: www.unit11.org

El Paso-Gridley Community Unit School District 11 is a unit school district in Woodford, Livingston, and McLean counties in Illinois. It was formed in 2004 by the consolidation of Gridley Community Unit School District 10 and El Paso Community Unit School District 375, after formation of a new unit district was put to the voters on the 2004 Illinois primary election ballot.

== History ==
=== District 375 ===
==== El Paso ====
The city of El Paso was originally all within one school district, but after the brick school was built on the east side of the city in 1869, upset people on the west side managed to split the district and form a second school district. The west side had a new, wooden school until Jefferson Park School was built on the same site in 1897. The east-side school was named McKinley School shortly after President William McKinley was assassinated in 1901. Both districts eventually had two-year high schools, and in 1892 both began four-year high school education. El Paso High School District 375 was formed in 1916 from the area of the east-side and west-side city districts and some rural areas, and originally continued holding classes in the east and west school buildings, but also held some classes in some downtown El Paso office buildings, until the El Paso High School building was finished in 1921.

On May 22, 1944, the citizens voted to consolidate El Paso's east-side and west-side grade school districts.

==== Panola Township ====
By 1878, Panola Township had 10 school districts — Panola, Hilsabeck, Shaw, Pauley, De Vries, McOmber, Hodgson, Bassett, Roth, and Punke — with a total of 480 students. Nine of these districts survived all the way to the formation of the unit district in 1949.

==== El Paso Community Unit School District 375 ====
Unit School District 375 was organized on April 26, 1948.

McKinley School on East Second Street was closed in 1948; it was sold in 1957, and demolished in May 1959. In addition, all the rural schoolhouses were closed in 1949, except for first through sixth grades at the Secor and Spring Hill schools.

Centennial School was dedicated on September 13, 1956.

Cooperative special education with other Woodford County schools and McLean County Unit District No. 5 began in 1969.

Unit School District 375 closed the school in Secor at the end of the 1973–1974 school year, at which time it had 38 students, who afterwards went to Jefferson Park School and Centennial School.

== Boundary ==
In Woodford County, the district includes Panola, El Paso, Kappa, and Secor.

It also has sections of Livingston and McLean counties.
