= Spring Bay, Illinois =

Spring Bay
- Village
- Location of Spring Bay in Woodford County, Illinois.
- Coordinates: 40°49′14″N 89°31′43″W
- Country: United States
- State: Illinois
- County: Woodford
- Founded: 1836

Government
  - Mayor: Dave Tilley

Area
  - Total: 0.91 sq mi (2.35 km^{2})
  - Land: 0.68 sq mi (1.77 km^{2})
  - Water: 0.22 sq mi (0.57 km^{2})
- Elevation: 446 ft (136 m)

Population (2020)
  - Total: 474
  - Estimate (2024): 483
  - Density: 692.7/sq mi (267.44/km^{2})
- Time zone: UTC-6 (CST)
  - Summer (DST): UTC-5 (CDT)
- ZIP code: 61611
- Area code: 309
- FIPS code: 17-71604
- GNIS feature ID: 2399875
- Website: https://www.villageofspringbay.org/

Spring Bay is a village in Woodford County, Illinois, United States. As of the 2020 United States census, the village population was 474, up from 452 in 2010. The village is part of the Peoria, Illinois Metropolitan Statistical Area.

== Geography ==
According to the 2010 census, Spring Bay has a total area of 1.149 square miles (2.98 km^{2}), of which 0.82 square miles (2.12 km^{2}) (or 71.37%) is land and 0.329 square miles (0.85 km^{2}) (or 28.63%) is water.

== Demographics ==
Historical population
Census	Pop.	Note	%±
1870	235		—
1880	175		−25.5%
1890	147		−16.0%
1900	128		−12.9%
1910	119		−7.0%
1920	89		−25.2%
1930	85		−4.5%
1940	157		84.7%
1950	203		29.3%
1960	285		40.4%
1970	427		49.8%
1980	496		16.2%
1990	439		−11.5%
2000	436		−0.7%
2010	452		3.7%
2020	474		4.9%
U.S. Decennial Census

As of the census of 2000, there were 436 people, 173 households, and 125 families residing in the village. The population density was 541.0 inhabitants per square mile (208.9/km^{2}). There were 187 housing units at an average density of 232.0 units per square mile (89.6 units/km^{2}). The racial makeup of the village was 98.85% White, 0.46% African American, 0.23% Native American, and 0.46% from two or more races. Hispanic or Latino of any race were 0.69% of the population.

There were 173 households, out of which 28.3% had children under the age of 18 living with them, 57.8% were married couples living together, 9.2% had a female householder with no husband % of all households were made up of individuals, and 9.2% had someone living alone who was 65 years of age or older. The average household size was 2.52 and the average family size was 2.95.

In the village, the population was spread out, with 23.9% under the age of 18, 9.4% from 18 to 24, 31.0% from 25 to 44, 24.1% from 45 to 64, and 11.7% who were 65 years of age or older. The median age was 37 years. For every 100 females, there were 93.8 males.

== Education ==
It is in the Riverview Consolidated Community School District 2 and the Metamora Township High School District 122.
