= Metamora, Illinois =

Metamora
- Village
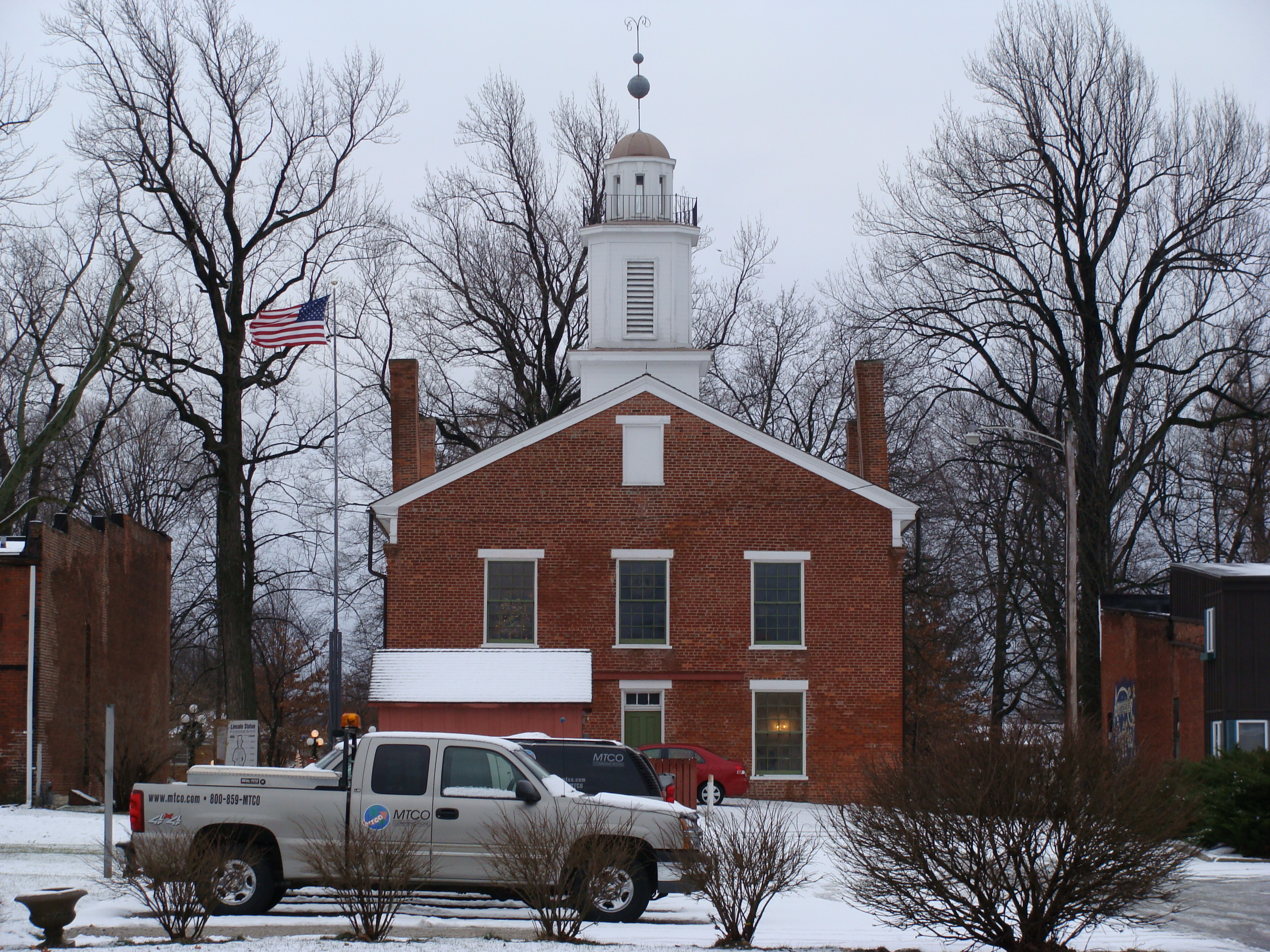
- Metamora Historic Courthouse, from East Chatham Street

- Location of Metamora in Woodford County, Illinois.
- Coordinates: 40°47′47″N 89°22′26″W
- Country: United States
- State: Illinois
- County: Woodford
- Founded: 1836

Government
  - Mayor: Dawn Deeb

Area
  - Total: 2.27 sq mi (5.89 km^{2})
  - Land: 2.27 sq mi (5.88 km^{2})
  - Water: 0.0039 sq mi (0.01 km^{2})
- Elevation: 804 ft (245 m)

Population (2020)
  - Total: 3,904
  - Density: 1,718.8/sq mi (663.65/km^{2})
- Time zone: UTC-6 (CST)
  - Summer (DST): UTC-5 (CDT)
- ZIP code: 61548
- Area code: 309
- FIPS code: 17-48606
- GNIS feature ID: 2399325
- Website: villageofmetamora.com

Metamora is a village in Metamora Township, Woodford County, Illinois, United States. As of the 2020 census, Metamora had a population of 3,904. Metamora is a growing suburb of Peoria and is part of the Peoria, Illinois Metropolitan Statistical Area.

== Name ==
Metamora was founded as Hanover in 1836. It was named for Hanover, New Hampshire by a consortium of land speculators called the Hanover Company. New post office conventions required towns to have unique names, forcing the town to differentiate itself from others in Illinois named Hanover. Early post office names included Black Partridge (1836) and Partridge Point (1837). The name of the village was finally changed to Metamora in 1845 based on the character in the popular play Metamora; or, The Last of the Wampanoags. The village still has a Hanover Street and Partridge Street, reflecting these earlier names. Also, a popular location Black Partridge Park.

== History ==
Metamora was settled by Yankee settlers. These were people from New England who were descended from the English Puritans who settled that region in the 1600s. The first group were settlers from Hanover, New Hampshire, organized by a company from Gilmanton, New Hampshire who named the town Hanover. A New England man named John Page scouted the area for the company and decided that this particular tract of land would be a good place for farms. When they arrived the area was a forest, with no roads and no structures. The New Hampshire settlers cleared the forest, constructed roads and built farms as well as a small town to support the farms. Other New England settlers arrived shortly thereafter from the states of Rhode Island, Vermont and Massachusetts. Metamora was the county seat of Woodford County from 1843 until 1896. The Metamora Courthouse State Historic Site, a courthouse from this period, is preserved as an Illinois state historic site. Future President Abraham Lincoln and future Vice President Adlai E. Stevenson I practiced law there.

== Geography ==
According to the 2010 census, Metamora has a total area of 2.204 square miles (5.71 km^{2}), of which 2.2 square miles (5.70 km^{2}) (or 99.82%) is land and 0.004 square miles (0.01 km^{2}) (or 0.18%) is water.

== Demographics ==
Historical population
Census	Pop.	Note	%±
1860	966		—
1870	762		−21.1%
1880	828		8.7%
1890	758		−8.5%
1900	758		0.0%
1910	694		−8.4%
1920	683		−1.6%
1930	707		3.5%
1940	896		26.7%
1950	1,368		52.7%
1960	1,808		32.2%
1970	2,176		20.4%
1980	2,482		14.1%
1990	2,520		1.5%
2000	2,700		7.1%
2010	3,636		34.7%
2020	3,904		7.4%
U.S. Decennial Census

=== 2020 census ===
As of the 2020 census, Metamora had a population of 3,904. The median age was 41.5 years. 25.8% of residents were under the age of 18 and 24.1% of residents were 65 years of age or older. For every 100 females there were 95.6 males, and for every 100 females age 18 and over there were 88.4 males age 18 and over.

0.0% of residents lived in urban areas, while 100.0% lived in rural areas.

There were 1,491 households in Metamora, of which 33.4% had children under the age of 18 living in them. Of all households, 55.5% were married-couple households, 14.0% were households with a male householder and no spouse or partner present, and 26.6% were households with a female householder and no spouse or partner present. About 28.8% of all households were made up of individuals and 18.9% had someone living alone who was 65 years of age or older.

There were 1,629 housing units, of which 8.5% were vacant. The homeowner vacancy rate was 2.2% and the rental vacancy rate was 14.2%.

Racial composition as of the 2020 census
Race	Number	Percent
White	3,650	93.5%
Black or African American	9	0.2%
American Indian and Alaska Native	8	0.2%
Asian	24	0.6%
Native Hawaiian and Other Pacific Islander	0	0.0%
Some other race	27	0.7%
Two or more races	186	4.8%
Hispanic or Latino (of any race)	77	2.0%

=== 2000 census ===
As of the census of 2000, there were 2,700 people, 1,050 households, and 743 families residing in the village. The population density was 1,944.4 inhabitants per square mile (750.7/km^{2}). There were 1,094 housing units at an average density of 787.9 units per square mile (304.2 units/km^{2}). The racial makeup of the village was 99.07% White, 0.26% African American, 0.19% Native American, 0.00% Asian, 0.07% from other races, and 0.33% from two or more races. Hispanic or Latino of any race were 0.63% of the population.

There were 1,050 households, out of which 30.4% had children under the age of 18 living with them, 61.3% were married couples living together, 8.0% had a female householder with no husband present, and 29.2% were non-families. 27.4% of all households were made up of individuals, and 17.6% had someone living alone who was 65 years of age or older. The average household size was 2.44 and the average family size was 2.97.

In the village, the population was spread out, with 23.8% under the age of 18, 5.6% from 18 to 24, 23.4% from 25 to 44, 22.2% from 45 to 64, and 25.0% who were 65 years of age or older. The median age was 43 years. For every 100 females, there were 87.5 males. For every 100 females age 18 and over, there were 81.7 males.

The median income for a household in the village was $46,691, and the median income for a family was $56,384. Males had a median income of $40,745 versus $26,505 for females. The per capita income for the village was $20,200. About 1.8% of families and 2.9% of the population were below the poverty line, including 3.8% of those under age 18 and 2.0% of those age 65 or over.

== Education ==
Metamora has a grade school district, a high school district, and a Catholic grade school.

The village is served by Metamora Community Consolidated School District 1 for Kindergarten through 8th grade and by Metamora Township High School for 9th through 12th.

- Metamora Grade School District 1 serves Kindergarten through Grade 8 in Metamora Township and parts of nearby Worth Township.
- Metamora Township High School District 122 operates one four-year high school serving the village, along with nearby Germantown Hills, and Spring Bay.
- St. Mary's Grade School Grades Kindergarten-8th

== Events ==
At the beginning of August, Metamora hosts the annual "Metamora 4x50" race, an ultracycling event in which participants compete by riding a 50-mile loop four times.

The Redbirds are the local high school team mascot, and students participate in a range of regional sports meets including golf, volleyball, and soccer.

The Village of Metamora puts on Old Settler's Days each year around the third week of June. It's a century-old tradition involving carnival rides, live local music, and plenty of food. The Lincoln-Douglas 5K and 8 Mile Runs are also conducted during the weekend of Old Settler's Days.

== Government ==
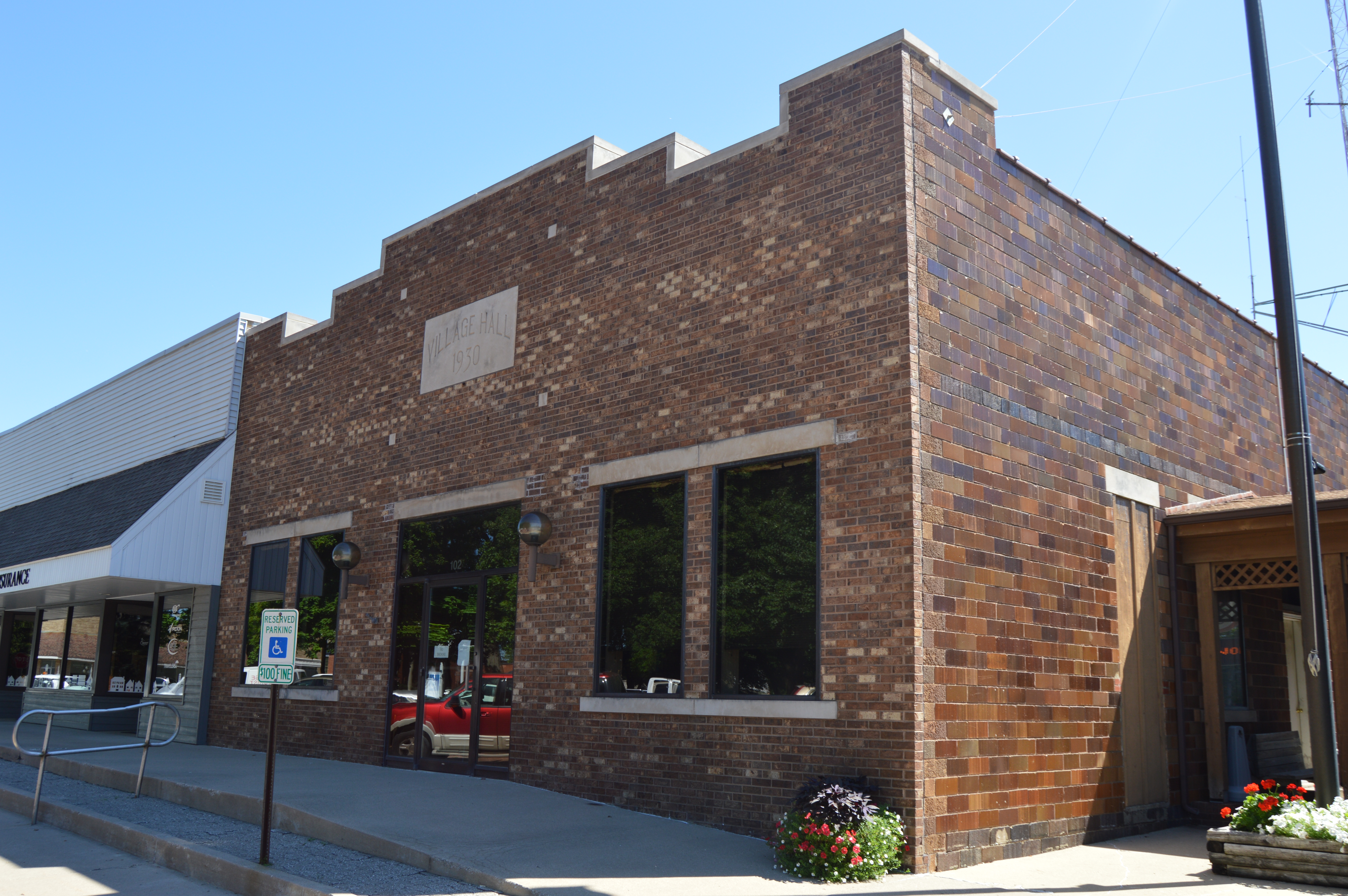
Metamora Village Hall

Village presidents of Metamora
Years	Name	notes		
1859	Samuel J. Crop			
1860	James D. Perry			
1861	J. M. Clark			
1862-1863	Edgar Babcock			
1864-1865	J. M. Clark			
1866-1868	Alfred Bowen			
1868-1872	?	no record available		
1872	Henry C. Dent			
1873	John G. Perry	by June President and Trustees had resigned		
1873	S. W. Egbert	finished Perry's term		
1874	S. S. Page			
1875-1877	A. H. Kinneas	citizens voted to reorganize village under general law		
1877	Issac Wikoff			
1878	A. H. Kinneas			
1879	George Painter			
1880	Dr. Z. H. Whitmore			
1881-1882	E. J. Avery			
1883	Garmen Gisk			
1884	Peter Schertz			
1885	James Graham			
1886-1887	E. J. Avery			
1888-1890	J. L. McGuire			
1891-1894	?			
1894	Henry Roberts	replaced McGuire after McGuire's resignation		
1895	Henry Roberts			
1896	Ed B. Whitmire	resigned		
1896	H. Weast	replaced Whitmire		
1897-1902	J. C. Irving			
1903-1904	Frank Giehl			
1905-1906	J. C. Irving			
1907-1910	Frank Giehl			
1911-1912	J. I. Knoblauch			
1913-1931	John C. Snyder			
1931-1945	Robert J. Schneider			
1945-1949	Chris E. Wiedman			
1949-1953	Francis Kerrigan			
1953-1957	Chris E. Wiedman			
1957-1961	Francis Kerrigan			
1961-1969	Donald P. Smith			
1969-1989	Robert Harbers Jr.			
1989-1993	Dale Whittington			
1993-1998	James B. Garber	died 1997 while in office		
1998	John Bockler	appointed Mayor Pro Tem for Garber's term		
1998-2001	Gene Hart			
2001-2005	Matthew O'Shea	Briefly ran for U.S. Senate in 2004.		
2005-2009	Paul Kouri			
2009-2012	William Belshaw	died 2012 while in office		
2012	John Heinz	appointed Mayor Pro Tem for Belshaw's term		
2012–2021	Ken Maurer			
2021–2025	John Cummings		2025–present	Dawn Deeb

== Popular culture ==
Metamora, Illinois served as the location for the fictional Edgecreek, Illinois in several independent films from Ten Thirty-One Pictures Entertainment, including The Only Way in 2004.
