= Metamora Township, Illinois =

Township in Illinois

Coordinates: 40°48′N 89°20′W

Metamora Township
- Township
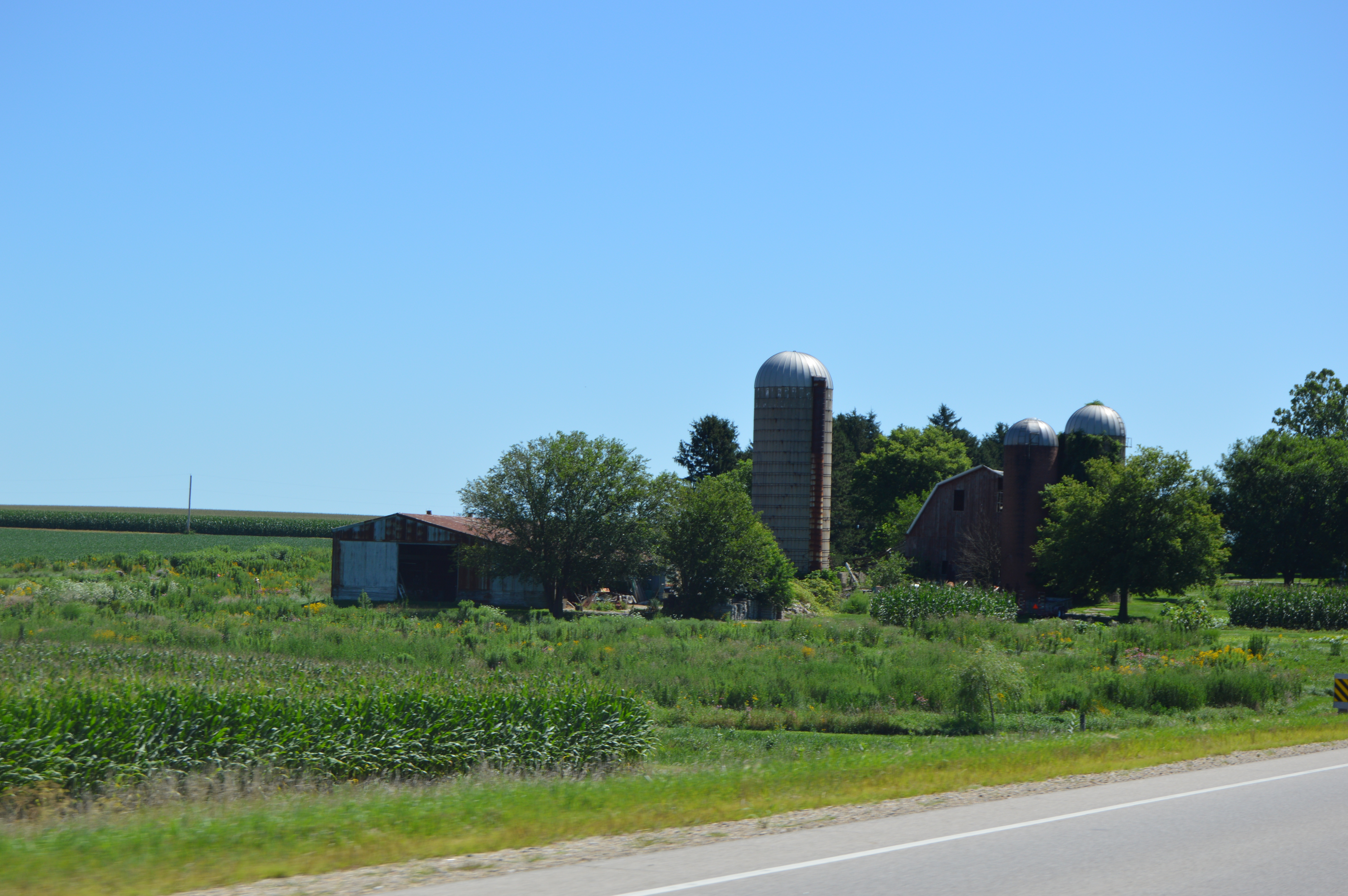
- Farm on Illinois Route 116 east of Metamora

- Location in Woodford County
- Country: United States
- State: Illinois
- County: Woodford
- Established: November 7, 1854

Area
  - Total: 36.47 sq mi (94.5 km^{2})
  - Land: 36.46 sq mi (94.4 km^{2})
  - Water: 0.01 sq mi (0.026 km^{2}) 0.03%

Population (2010)
  - Estimate (2016): 4,450
  - Density: 119.5/sq mi (46.1/km^{2})
- Time zone: UTC-6 (CST)
  - Summer (DST): UTC-5 (CDT)
- FIPS code: 17-203-48619

Metamora Township, Township 27 North, Range 2 West of the Third Principal Meridian, is located in Woodford County, Illinois. It includes the village of Metamora, Illinois and is accessible by State Routes 89 and 116. State Route 117 runs along the southern part of its eastern border.

As of the 2010 census, its population was 4,357 and it included 1,741 housing units.

== Geography ==
According to the 2010 census, the township has a total area of 36.47 square miles (94.5 km^{2}), of which 36.46 square miles (94.4 km^{2}) (or 99.97%) is land and 0.01 square miles (0.026 km^{2}) (or 0.03%) is water.

== Demographics ==
Historical population
Census	Pop.	Note	%±
2016 (est.)	4,450
U.S. Decennial Census
