= Clayton Township, Adams County, Illinois =

Township in Illinois, US

Clayton Township
- Township
- Location in Adams County

- Adams County's location in Illinois
- Coordinates: 40°03′37″N 90°58′23″W
- Country: United States
- State: Illinois
- County: Adams
- Established: November 6, 1849

Area
  - Total: 36.96 sq mi (95.7 km^{2})
  - Land: 36.95 sq mi (95.7 km^{2})
  - Water: 0.01 sq mi (0.026 km^{2}) 0.03%
- Elevation: 696 ft (212 m)

Population (2020)
  - Total: 958
  - Density: 25.9/sq mi (10.0/km^{2})
- Time zone: UTC-6 (CST)
  - Summer (DST): UTC-5 (CDT)
- ZIP codes: 62320, 62324, 62339
- FIPS code: 17-001-14780

Clayton Township is one of twenty-two townships in Adams County, Illinois, United States. As of the 2020 census, its population was 958 and it contained 474 housing units.

== History ==
Clayton Township is named for Kentucky statesman Henry Clay.

== Geography ==
According to the 2010 census, the township has a total area of 36.96 square miles (95.7 km^{2}), of which 36.95 square miles (95.7 km^{2}) (or 99.97%) is land and 0.01 square miles (0.026 km^{2}) (or 0.03%) is water.

=== Cities ===
- Clayton
- Golden (southeast edge)

=== Unincorporated towns ===
(This list is based on USGS data and may include former settlements.)

=== Cemeteries ===
The township contains six cemeteries: Evangelical Lutheran, Meints, Pleasant View, Sargent, South Side and West Side.

=== Major highways ===
- US Route 24
- Illinois State Route 94

== Demographics ==
As of the 2020 census there were 958 people, 362 households, and 234 families residing in the township. The population density was 25.91 inhabitants per square mile (10.00/km^{2}). There were 474 housing units at an average density of 12.82 units per square mile (4.95 units/km^{2}). The racial makeup of the township was 93.22% White, 1.04% African American, 0.00% Native American, 0.42% Asian, 0.00% Pacific Islander, 0.63% from other races, and 4.70% from two or more races. Hispanic or Latino of any race were 1.36% of the population.

There were 362 households, out of which 22.90% had children under the age of 18 living with them, 45.58% were married couples living together, 12.71% had a female householder with no spouse present, and 35.36% were non-families. 31.80% of all households were made up of individuals, and 14.60% had someone living alone who was 65 years of age or older. The average household size was 2.07 and the average family size was 2.49.

The township's age distribution consisted of 17.4% under the age of 18, 11.7% from 18 to 24, 19.5% from 25 to 44, 27.8% from 45 to 64, and 23.7% who were 65 years of age or older. The median age was 46.5 years. For every 100 females, there were 105.2 males. For every 100 females age 18 and over, there were 100.6 males.

The median income for a household in the township was $43,750, and the median income for a family was $51,250. Males had a median income of $36,250 versus $17,566 for females. The per capita income for the township was $24,300. About 16.2% of families and 19.8% of the population were below the poverty line, including 18.3% of those under age 18 and 12.4% of those age 65 or over.

Historical population
Census	Pop.	Note	%±
2010	1,027		—
2020	958		−6.7%
U.S. Decennial Census

== School districts ==
- Central Community Unit School District 3
- Southeastern Community Unit School District 337

== Political districts ==
- Illinois's 18th congressional district
- State House District 93
- State Senate District 47
