= Spring Bay Township, Illinois =

Coordinates: 40°47′36″N 89°31′37″W

Spring Bay Township
- Township
- Location in Woodford County
- Country: United States
- State: Illinois
- County: Woodford
- Established: November 7, 1854

Area
  - Total: 16.92 sq mi (43.8 km^{2})
  - Land: 10.28 sq mi (26.6 km^{2})
  - Water: 6.64 sq mi (17.2 km^{2}) 39.24%

Population (2010)
  - Estimate (2016): 2,685
  - Density: 257.1/sq mi (99.3/km^{2})
- Time zone: UTC-6 (CST)
  - Summer (DST): UTC-5 (CDT)
- FIPS code: 17-203-71611

Spring Bay Township is located in Woodford County, Illinois, United States. As of the 2010 census, its population was 2,643 and it contained 1,133 housing units.

== Geography ==
According to the 2010 census, the township has a total area of 16.92 square miles (43.8 km^{2}), of which 10.28 square miles (26.6 km^{2}) (or 60.76%) is land and 6.64 square miles (17.2 km^{2}) (or 39.24%) is water.

== Demographics ==
Historical population
Census	Pop.	Note	%±
2016 (est.)	2,685
U.S. Decennial Census
