= Clayton Township, Woodford County, Illinois =

Coordinates: 40°53′N 89°6′W

Clayton Township
- Township
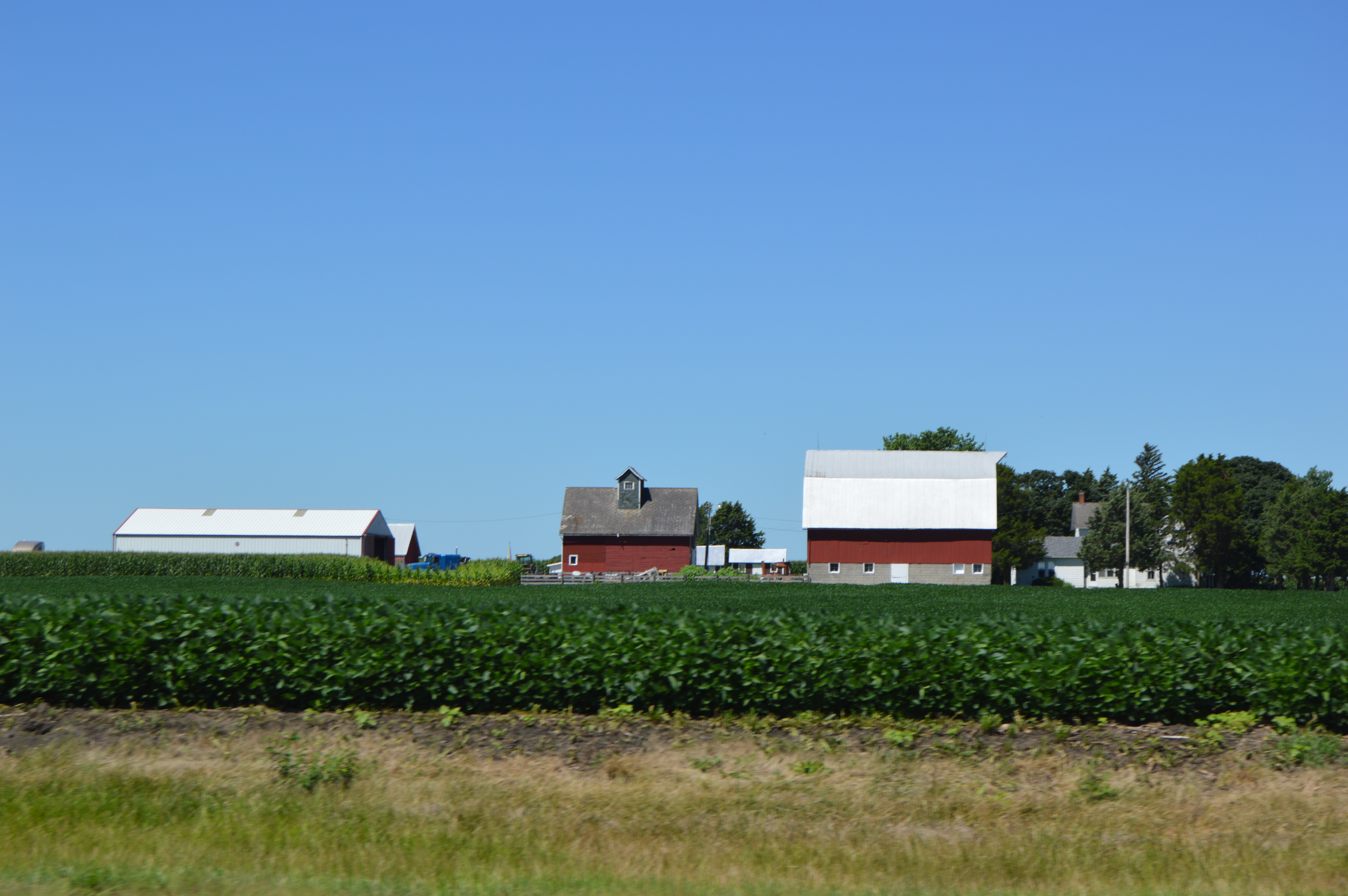
- Farm west of Benson

- Location in Woodford County
- Country: United States
- State: Illinois
- County: Woodford
- Established: Unknown

Area
  - Total: 35.81 sq mi (92.7 km^{2})
  - Land: 35.81 sq mi (92.7 km^{2})
  - Water: 0 sq mi (0 km^{2}) 0%

Population (2010)
  - Estimate (2016): 693
  - Density: 19.5/sq mi (7.5/km^{2})
- Time zone: UTC-6 (CST)
  - Summer (DST): UTC-5 (CDT)
- FIPS code: 17-203-14793

Clayton Township is located in Woodford County, Illinois at T28N, R1E. As of the 2010 census, its population was 697 and it contained 300 housing units. Clayton Township and Linn Township (T28N, R1W) were originally the same township, but the date of separation is unknown.

== Geography ==
According to the 2010 census, the township has a total area of 35.81 square miles (92.7 km^{2}), all land.

== Demographics ==
Historical population
Census	Pop.	Note	%±
2016 (est.)	693
U.S. Decennial Census
