= Palestine Township, Illinois =

Coordinates: 40°42′29″N 89°06′57″W

Palestine Township
- Township
- Location in Woodford County
- Country: United States
- State: Illinois
- County: Woodford
- Established: November 7, 1854

Area
  - Total: 37.54 sq mi (97.2 km^{2})
  - Land: 37.51 sq mi (97.2 km^{2})
  - Water: 0.03 sq mi (0.078 km^{2}) 0.08%

Population (2010)
  - Estimate (2016): 1,044
  - Density: 27.8/sq mi (10.7/km^{2})
- Time zone: UTC-6 (CST)
  - Summer (DST): UTC-5 (CDT)
- FIPS code: 17-203-57290

Palestine Township is located in Woodford County, Illinois. As of the 2010 census, its population was 1,043 and it contained 424 housing units.

== Geography ==
According to the 2010 census, the township has a total area of 37.54 square miles (97.2 km^{2}), of which 37.51 square miles (97.2 km^{2}) (or 99.92%) is land and 0.03 square miles (0.078 km^{2}) (or 0.08%) is water.

== Demographics ==
Historical population
Census	Pop.	Note	%±
2016 (est.)	1,044
U.S. Decennial Census
