= Matanzas Beach, Illinois =

- Unincorporated community
- Location within Illinois Location within the United States
- Coordinates: 40°14′35″N 90°06′14″W
- Country: United States
- State: Illinois
- County: Mason
- Elevation: 459 ft (140 m)
- Time zone: UTC-6 (Central (CST))
  - Summer (DST): UTC-5 (CDT)
- Area code: 309
- GNIS feature ID: 413112

Matanzas Beach is an unincorporated community in Bath and Havana townships, Mason County, Illinois, United States. Matanzas Beach is located on Illinois Route 78 along the southeast shore of Matanzas Lake, 4 miles (6.4 km) south-southeast of Havana.
