= Quiver (disambiguation) =

A quiver is a container for archery ammunition.

Quiver may also refer to:

== Arts and entertainment ==
- Quiver (video game), a 1997 first-person shooter video game
- Quiver, the code-name for the computer game Half-Life during early development

=== Literature ===
- Quiver (comics), a Green Arrow story arc
- The Quiver, an English magazine published 1861–1956
- Quiver, an imprint of the Quarto Group focusing on sex
- Quivers, a 1991 comic book by Brian Bendis

=== Music ===
- Quiver (band), a British 1970s rock band
- Quiver (KTU album), 2009
- Quiver (Ron Miles album), 2012
- Quiver, a 1998 album by Wild Strawberries

== Science and biology ==
- Quiver (mathematics), a type of graph
- Quiver diagram, a graph in physics
- Vector field, a plot with arrows that indicate the direction and magnitude
- Quiver tree, a South African succulent plant, Aloidendron dichotomum, related to aloes
- A group of cobras

== Places ==
- Quiver Township, Mason County, Illinois, USA
- Quiver Creek, a stream in Illinois, USA
- Quiver River, a river in Mississippi, USA
- Quiver Tree Forest, Namibia

== Other uses ==
- Quiverfull, a movement eschews all forms of contraception, including natural family planning and sterilization

== See also ==
- Surfboard quiver
