= Goofy Ridge, Illinois =

- Census-designated place
- Location within Illinois Location within the United States
- Coordinates: 40°23′42″N 89°56′27″W
- Country: United States
- State: Illinois
- County: Mason
- Civil township: Quiver

Area
  - Total: 1.35 sq mi (3.49 km^{2})
  - Land: 1.35 sq mi (3.49 km^{2})
  - Water: 0 sq mi (0.00 km^{2})
- Elevation: 479 ft (146 m)

Population (2020)
  - Total: 210
  - Density: 155.7/sq mi (60.12/km^{2})
- Time zone: UTC-6 (Central (CST))
  - Summer (DST): UTC-5 (CDT)
- ZIP Codes: 61567 (Topeka); 62644 (Havana)
- Area code: 309
- GNIS feature ID: 2628551

Goofy Ridge is an unincorporated community and census-designated place in Quiver Township, Mason County, Illinois, United States. As of the 2020 census, its population was 210, down from 350 in 2010. Goofy Ridge is given Topeka mailing addresses.

== History ==
According to American Journal by Gary Gladstone, Goofy Ridge got its name thus:

Years back it was just The Ridge, a camp near the river bank where moonshiners and other carousers met weekly to do their drinking. After some serious drinking one night, a local game warden said he wasn't too drunk to shoot a walnut off the head of a volunteer. Naturally, someone was drunk enough to volunteer. The game warden placed the tiny target on the volunteer's head, aimed his .22 rifle, and shot the nut right off. This caper was called by a witness "one damned goofy thing to do," and the camp was ever after known as Goofy Ridge.

According to Storyville, USA by Dale Peterson, "Al Capone, as a matter of fact, used to come down [to Goofy Ridge] to hunt and fish."

== Demographics ==
Historical population
| Census | Pop. | Note | %± |
|---|---|---|---|
| 2010 | 350 | | — |
| 2020 | 210 | | −40.0% |
U.S. Decennial Census

== See also ==
- List of census-designated places in Illinois
