= Bishop, Illinois =

- Unincorporated community
- Location within Illinois Location within the United States
- Coordinates: 40°20′45″N 89°52′29″W
- Country: United States
- State: Illinois
- County: Mason
- Elevation: 495 ft (151 m)
- Time zone: UTC-6 (Central (CST))
  - Summer (DST): UTC-5 (CDT)
- Area code: 309
- GNIS feature ID: 422467

Bishop is an unincorporated community in Forest City Township, Mason County, Illinois, United States. Bishop is 3 miles (4.8 km) west-southwest of Forest City.

The community was founded in 1875 as a station on the Peoria, Pekin and Jacksonville Railroad. The town was named for the site owner Henry Bishop. Bishop's Station post office was established in 1869, changed to Bishop in 1883. Bishop is also home to the Zion Cemetery
