= Clear Lake Site =

Archaeological site in Illinois, United States

- U.S. National Register of Historic Places
- Location within Illinois Location within the United States
- Location: Junction of 1200E and 2600N in Sand Ridge State Park; Manito, Mason County, Illinois, USA
- Coordinates: 40°25′22″N 89°46′48″W
- Area: 9.5 acres (3.8 ha)
- NRHP reference No.: 78001171
- Added to NRHP: November 28, 1978

Clear Lake Site is an archaeological site located in Sand Ridge State Park 6.5 miles (10.5 km) from Manito, Illinois. The site was occupied for the majority of the period from 500 B.C. to 1500 A.D.; cultures which have occupied the site include the Early Woodland, Havana Hopewell, and Mississippian. The site consists of a village area and two burial mounds. University of Chicago archaeologists conducted the first excavations at the site in 1932. Significant further excavations were conducted by George and Ethel Schoenbeck of the Peoria Academy of Science; the couple recovered 24,000 pottery shards from the site which represent every pottery type found in Central Illinois. The Illinois State Museum, which received all artifacts recovered by the Schoenbecks, conducted its own excavations at the site in the 1950s.

The site was added to the National Register of Historic Places on November 28, 1978.

== See also ==
- List of archaeological sites on the National Register of Historic Places in Illinois
