= Mason City, Illinois =

- City
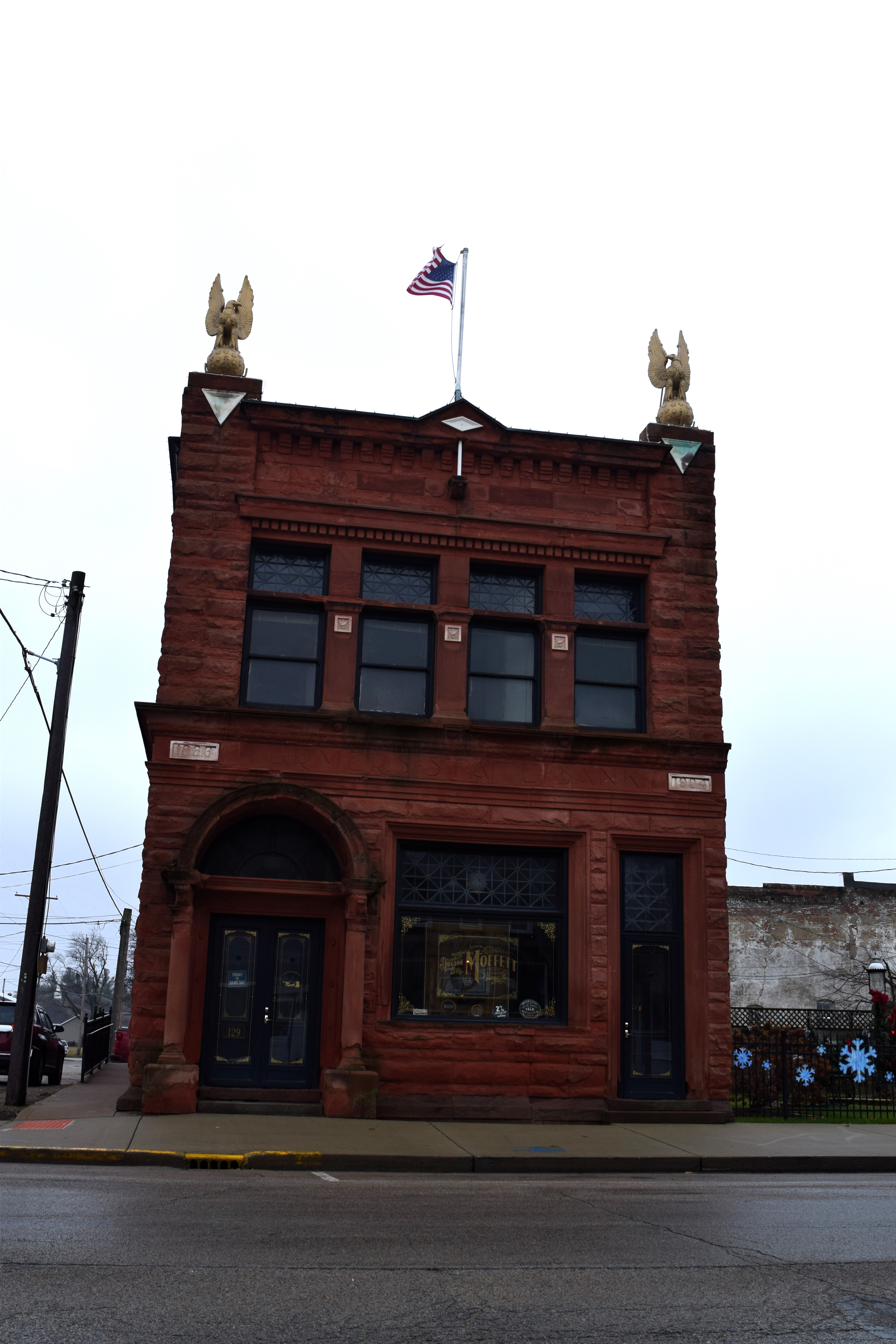
- Farmers State Bank building in Mason City

- Location in Mason County, Illinois
- Coordinates: 40°12′08″N 89°41′50″W
- Country: United States
- State: Illinois
- County: Mason
- Township: Mason City

Area
  - Total: 1.01 sq mi (2.62 km^{2})
  - Land: 1.01 sq mi (2.62 km^{2})
  - Water: 0 sq mi (0.00 km^{2})
- Elevation: 577 ft (176 m)

Population (2020)
  - Total: 2,077
  - Density: 2,050.4/sq mi (791.68/km^{2})
- Time zone: UTC−6 (CST)
  - Summer (DST): UTC−5 (CDT)
- ZIP code: 62664
- Area code: 217
- FIPS code: 17-47475
- GNIS ID: 2395040
- Website: www.masoncityil.com

Mason City is a city in Mason County, Illinois, United States. The population was 2,077 at the 2020 census, down from 2,343 in 2010.

== History ==
Mason City was established in 1857. The city took its name from Mason County.

== Geography ==
Mason City is located in eastern Mason County. Illinois Route 10 passes through the city as Chestnut Street, leading east 19 miles (31 km) to Lincoln and west 8 miles (13 km) to Easton. Havana, the Mason county seat, is 22 miles (35 km) to the northwest of Mason City. Illinois Route 29 touches the western edge of the city, leading north 29 miles (47 km) to Pekin and south 32 miles (51 km) to Springfield, the state capital.

According to the U.S. Census Bureau, Mason City has a total area of 1.01 square miles (2.62 km^{2}), all land. The city drains to the south toward Salt Creek, a west-flowing tributary of the Sangamon River and part of the Illinois River watershed.

== Demographics ==
Historical population
| Census | Pop. | Note | %± |
|---|---|---|---|
| 1860 | 264 | | — |
| 1870 | 1,615 | | 511.7% |
| 1880 | 1,714 | | 6.1% |
| 1890 | 1,869 | | 9.0% |
| 1900 | 1,890 | | 1.1% |
| 1910 | 1,842 | | −2.5% |
| 1920 | 1,880 | | 2.1% |
| 1930 | 1,941 | | 3.2% |
| 1940 | 1,984 | | 2.2% |
| 1950 | 2,004 | | 1.0% |
| 1960 | 2,160 | | 7.8% |
| 1970 | 2,611 | | 20.9% |
| 1980 | 2,719 | | 4.1% |
| 1990 | 2,323 | | −14.6% |
| 2000 | 2,558 | | 10.1% |
| 2010 | 2,343 | | −8.4% |
| 2020 | 2,077 | | −11.4% |
U.S. Decennial Census

=== 2020 census ===
As of the 2020 census, Mason City had a population of 2,077. The median age was 44.3 years. 20.6% of residents were under the age of 18 and 23.4% were 65 years of age or older. For every 100 females, there were 89.7 males, and for every 100 females age 18 and over, there were 86.2 males age 18 and over.

0.0% of residents lived in urban areas, while 100.0% lived in rural areas.

There were 904 households, of which 24.8% had children under the age of 18 living in them. Of all households, 40.9% were married-couple households, 17.8% were households with a male householder and no spouse or partner present, and 32.1% were households with a female householder and no spouse or partner present. About 36.3% of all households were made up of individuals, and 16.9% had someone living alone who was 65 years of age or older.

There were 1,035 housing units, of which 12.7% were vacant. The homeowner vacancy rate was 5.5% and the rental vacancy rate was 8.5%.

Racial composition as of the 2020 census
| Race | Number | Percent |
|---|---|---|
| White | 1,981 | 95.4% |
| Black or African American | 11 | 0.5% |
| American Indian and Alaska Native | 4 | 0.2% |
| Asian | 8 | 0.4% |
| Native Hawaiian and Other Pacific Islander | 0 | 0.0% |
| Some other race | 8 | 0.4% |
| Two or more races | 65 | 3.1% |
| Hispanic or Latino (of any race) | 22 | 1.1% |

=== 2000 census ===
At the 2000 census, there were 2,558 people, 1,041 households and 681 families residing in the city. The population density was 2,599.1 inhabitants per square mile (1,003.5/km^{2}). There were 1,127 housing units at an average density of 1,145.1 per square mile (442.1/km^{2}). The racial makeup of the city was 99.06% White, 0.04% African American, 0.08% Native American, 0.16% Asian, 0.27% from other races, and 0.39% from two or more races. Hispanic or Latino of any race were 0.59% of the population.

There were 1,041 households, of which 30.4% had children under the age of 18 living with them, 51.3% were married couples living together, 11.2% had a female householder with no husband present, and 34.5% were non-families. 31.5% of all households were made up of individuals, and 18.3% had someone living alone who was 65 years of age or older. The average household size was 2.38 and the average family size was 2.95.

Age distribution was 25.2% under the age of 18, 7.0% from 18 to 24, 25.3% from 25 to 44, 20.7% from 45 to 64, and 21.9% who were 65 years of age or older. The median age was 40 years. For every 100 females, there were 87.1 males. For every 100 females age 18 and over, there were 81.7 males.

The median household income was $35,615, and the median family income was $47,991. Males had a median income of $35,058 versus $21,875 for females. The per capita income for the city was $18,411. About 6.8% of families and 9.3% of the population were below the poverty line, including 13.6% of those under age 18 and 8.0% of those age 65 or over.

== Notable people ==
- Gordon Buehrig, automobile designer, born in Mason City
- John Fahay, professional football player, born in Mason City
- John Means (AKA: "Dr. Gonzo"), stand-up comic, toured with Huey Lewis and the News, born in Mason City
- Clyde E. Stone, Chief Justice of the Illinois Supreme Court, born near Mason City
- Joe Sullivan, pitcher for the Detroit Tigers, Boston Braves, Boston Red Sox and Pittsburgh Pirates; born in Mason City
- Hallie Paxson Winsborough, Presbyterian church leader, anti-lynching activist, born in Mason City
- Vic Wunderle, archer, winner of the Olympic Individual Silver Medal (2000)
