= Kilbourne Township, Mason County, Illinois =

Kilbourne Township
- Township

- Location of Illinois in the United States
- Coordinates: 40°10′00″N 90°00′01″W
- Country: United States
- State: Illinois
- County: Mason
- Settled: 1831
- Organized: 1873

Area
  - Total: 40.36 sq mi (104.5 km^{2})
  - Land: 40.1 sq mi (104 km^{2})
  - Water: 0.26 sq mi (0.67 km^{2})
- Elevation: 495 ft (151 m)

Population (2010)
  - Estimate (2016): 469
  - Density: 12.6/sq mi (4.9/km^{2})
- Time zone: UTC-6 (CST)
  - Summer (DST): UTC-5 (CDT)
- FIPS code: 17-125-39870

Kilbourne Township is located in Mason County, Illinois. As of the 2010 census, its population was 504 and it contained 245 housing units.

== History ==
The land making up Kilbourne Township was first settled in 1831. The township was organized in 1873, around the time the Springfield and Northwestern Railroad was built. It was assembled half from Crane Creek Township and half from Bath Township. The resulting township corresponds largely to survey township 20 North, Range 8 West of the third principal meridian, but also includes some additional area to the southwest along the Sangamon River. The township draws its name from the village of Kilbourne, which in turn was named for railroad executive Edward Kilbourne.

== Geography ==
According to the 2010 census, the township has a total area of 40.36 square miles (104.5 km^{2}), of which 40.1 square miles (104 km^{2}) (or 99.36%) is land and 0.26 square miles (0.67 km^{2}) (or 0.64%) is water. This pattern of a very low population density, common across the rural Midwest, is a defining feature of the region's demographic history and presents unique challenges for local governance and service provision.

== Demographics ==
Historical population
Census	Pop.	Note	%±
2016 (est.)	469
U.S. Decennial Census
