= Sand Prairie-Scrub Oak Nature Preserve =

State park in Illinois, United States

- IUCN category V (protected landscape/seascape)
- Location within Illinois Location within the United States
- Location: Mason County, Illinois, USA
- Nearest city: Kilbourne, Illinois
- Coordinates: 40.172°N 90.080°W
- Area: 1,460 acres (5.9 km^{2})
- Established: April 1970
- Governing body: Illinois Department of Natural Resources

The Sand Prairie-Scrub Oak Nature Preserve, formerly called the Mason County State Wildlife Refuge and Recreation Area, is a 1,460 acre (591 ha) State Natural Area and Illinois Nature Preserve located in western Mason County, Illinois. The nearest town is Kilbourne, Illinois and the nearest numbered highway is Illinois Route 97. It contains fragmentary examples of the ecosystem described in its name.

== History ==
Sand Prairie-Scrub Oak is managed by the Illinois Department of Natural Resources (IDNR) as a state nature preserve. The preserve does not have on-site staff, and is managed as a disjunct area of Sand Ridge State Forest, a larger conservation area within the same county.

Sand Prairie-Scrub Oak was purchased in 1969 and dedicated as an Illinois Nature Preserve in April 1970.

The Sand Prairie-Scrub Oak Nature Preserve contains dry sand prairies, sand savannas, and sand forests. The soil is approximately 95% sand, 4% silt, and 1% clay.

== Flora ==
A study published in 2008 found 393 species within the preserve. Areas of savanna and forest are characterized by black oak and blackjack oak, with some mockernut. In a 2015 research and inspection fan-out, arborists discovered the first example of dwarf chinkapin oak identified in Illinois. Other unusual trees identified in the preserve include what are believed to be among the northernmost natural range trees of black hickory. Prairie grasses such as little bluestem, and sand plant life such as eastern prickly pear cactus, can be found.
