= Topeka, Illinois =

- Village
- Location in Mason County, Illinois
- Coordinates: 40°19′49″N 89°55′50″W
- Country: United States
- State: Illinois
- County: Mason
- Township: Quiver
- Incorporated: 1869

Area
  - Total: 0.14 sq mi (0.35 km^{2})
  - Land: 0.14 sq mi (0.35 km^{2})
  - Water: 0 sq mi (0.00 km^{2})
- Elevation: 472 ft (144 m)

Population (2020)
  - Total: 60
  - Density: 438.6/sq mi (169.33/km^{2})
- Time zone: UTC-6 (CST)
  - Summer (DST): UTC-5 (CDT)
- ZIP code: 61567
- Area code: 309
- FIPS code: 17-75757
- GNIS ID: 2399995

Topeka is an incorporated village in Mason County, Illinois, United States. The population was 60 at the 2020 census.

== Geography ==
Topeka is located in northern Mason County. It is 9 miles (14 km) northeast of Havana, the county seat, and 7 miles (11 km) southwest of Forest City.

According to the U.S. Census Bureau, Topeka has a total area of 0.14 square miles (0.36 km^{2}), all land. Mason Creek, a west-flowing tributary of the Illinois River, passes just south of the village limits.

== Demographics ==
Historical population
Census	Pop.	Note	%±
1880	98		—
1890	141		43.9%
1900	160		13.5%
1910	130		−18.7%
1920	109		−16.2%
1930	81		−25.7%
1940	82		1.2%
1950	72		−12.2%
1960	77		6.9%
1970	74		−3.9%
1980	140		89.2%
1990	93		−33.6%
2000	90		−3.2%
2010	76		−15.6%
2020	60		−21.1%
U.S. Decennial Census

As of the census of 2000, there were 90 people, 36 households, and 28 families residing in the town. The population density was 648.0 inhabitants per square mile (250.2/km^{2}). There were 36 housing units at an average density of 259.2 per square mile (100.1/km^{2}). The racial makeup of the town was 95.56% White, and 4.44% from two or more races.

There were 36 households, out of which 30.6% had children under the age of 18 living with them, 58.3% were married couples living together, 13.9% had a female householder with no husband present, and 22.2% were non-families. 16.7% of all households were made up of individuals, and 5.6% had someone living alone who was 65 years of age or older. The average household size was 2.50 and the average family size was 2.79.

In the town, the population was spread out, with 25.6% under the age of 18, 5.6% from 18 to 24, 32.2% from 25 to 44, 23.3% from 45 to 64, and 13.3% who were 65 years of age or older. The median age was 36 years. For every 100 females, there were 109.3 males. For every 100 females age 18 and over, there were 91.4 males.

The median income for a household in the town was $41,750, and the median income for a family was $46,875. Males had a median income of $45,938 versus $0 for females The per capita income for the town was $39,651. None of the population and none of the families were below the poverty line.
