= Easton, Illinois =

- Village
- Location in Mason County, Illinois
- Coordinates: 40°13′55″N 89°50′30″W
- Country: United States
- State: Illinois
- County: Mason
- Township: Sherman

Area
  - Total: 0.24 sq mi (0.62 km^{2})
  - Land: 0.24 sq mi (0.62 km^{2})
  - Water: 0 sq mi (0.00 km^{2})
- Elevation: 512 ft (156 m)

Population (2020)
  - Total: 312
  - Density: 1,300.1/sq mi (501.96/km^{2})
- Time zone: UTC-6 (CST)
  - Summer (DST): UTC-5 (CDT)
- ZIP code: 62633
- Area code: 309
- GNIS ID: 2398780
- FIPS code: 17-22151
- Website: www.villageofeaston.com

Easton is a village in Mason County, Illinois, United States. As of the 2020 census, the village population was 312.

== History ==
Easton was laid out in the 1870s by James Madison Samuell and named for Oliver C. Easton, postmaster of Havana at the time. A post office has been in operation at Easton since 1873.

== Geography ==
Easton is located in central Mason County. Illinois Route 10 passes through the village as its Main Street, leading east 8 miles (13 km) to Mason City and north 4 miles (6 km) to its terminus at U.S. Route 136. Havana, the Mason county seat, is 14 miles (23 km) northwest of Easton.

According to the U.S. Census Bureau, Easton has a total area of 0.24 square miles (0.62 km^{2}), all land.

== Demographics ==
Historical population
Census	Pop.	Note	%±
1900	335		—
1910	407		21.5%
1920	456		12.0%
1930	403		−11.6%
1940	442		9.7%
1950	371		−16.1%
1960	361		−2.7%
1970	386		6.9%
1980	392		1.6%
1990	351		−10.5%
2000	373		6.3%
2010	321		−13.9%
2020	312		−2.8%
U.S. Decennial Census

As of the 2000 United States census, there were 373 people, 151 households, and 110 families residing in the village. The population density was 1,599.5 inhabitants per square mile (617.6/km^{2}). There were 167 housing units at an average density of 716.1 per square mile (276.5/km^{2}). The racial makeup of the village was 99.46% White and 0.54% Native American. Hispanic or Latino of any race were 0.27% of the population.

There were 151 households, out of which 27.2% had children under the age of 18 living with them, 60.9% were married couples living together, 7.3% had a female householder with no husband present, and 26.5% were non-families. 23.8% of all households were made up of individuals, and 10.6% had someone living alone who was 65 years of age or older. The average household size was 2.47 and the average family size was 2.87.

In the village, the population was spread out, with 22.0% under the age of 18, 8.6% from 18 to 24, 29.0% from 25 to 44, 22.5% from 45 to 64, and 18.0% who were 65 years of age or older. The median age was 41 years. For every 100 females, there were 94.3 males. For every 100 females age 18 and over, there were 94.0 males.

The median income for a household in the village was $32,045, and the median income for a family was $38,125. Males had a median income of $28,750 versus $16,667 for females. The per capita income for the village was $14,745. None of the families and 1.0% of the population were living below the poverty line, including no under eighteens and 3.3% of those over 64.

== Local attractions ==
- Revis Hill Prairie State Natural Area is located 6 miles (10 km) south of Easton.
