= Lakewood, Mason County, Illinois =

Lakewood, Illinois
- Unincorporated community
- Location within Illinois Location within the United States
- Coordinates: 40°14′50″N 90°05′06″W
- Country: United States
- State: Illinois
- County: Mason
- Elevation: 466 ft (142 m)
- Time zone: UTC-6 (Central (CST))
  - Summer (DST): UTC-5 (CDT)
- Area code: 309
- GNIS feature ID: 422893

Lakewood is an unincorporated community in Havana Township, Mason County, Illinois, United States. Lakewood is located on County Route 1, 4 miles (6.4 km) south-southwest of Havana.
