= Revis Hill Prairie =

State park in Illinois, USA

- IUCN category IV (habitat/species management area)
- Location within Illinois
- Location: Mason County, Illinois, United States
- Nearest city: Easton, IL
- Coordinates: 40°09′12″N 89°50′42″W
- Area: 412.7 acres (167.0 ha)
- Established: August 1973
- Governing body: Illinois Department of Natural Resources

Revis Hill Prairie State Natural Area, also known as Revis Hill Prairie Nature Preserve, is a 412.7-acre (167.0 ha) state park located six miles south of Easton in Mason County, Illinois. It is operated by the Illinois Department of Natural Resources (IDNR) as a tallgrass prairie nature preserve and as a fish and wildlife area managed for deer hunting.

== History ==
Revis Hill is managed as a fragile ecosystem of loess, a loose, powdered loamy soil type formed from silt ground fine by glaciation and other events. After the loess was wind-deposited on the terrain of what became southern Mason County, Illinois to form a low hill, it was subject to rapid erosion and Revis Hill was dissected by ravines that drained into nearby Salt Creek.

Most of the Illinois hill prairie ecosystems that resembled Revis Hill were lost to the moldboard plow. Revis Hill re-entered the public domain and was dedicated by the state of Illinois as a natural area in August 1973. Land management practices utilized at Revis Hill include prescribed burning and the control of invasive species. The preserve is also managed for archery and firearm deer hunting, by permit only. IDNR supervises the unstaffed Revis Hill Prairie State Natural Area as a disjunct area of another Mason County state park that is staffed full-time, Sand Ridge State Forest.

== Flora ==
Tallgrass prairie plants, such as little bluestem grass, purple coneflower, and leadplant countered the erosion by developing significant, interlaced root systems that held much of the loessy dust in place in the uplands. Meanwhile, in the dissected ravines, an upland oak-hickory forest grew. The transition belts between the loessy hill prairie and the ravine woodlands developed into oak savanna.

Rare plants such as Skinner's gerardia and jeweled shooting star (Dodecatheon amethystinum) can be found at Revis Hill.

== Fauna ==
Animals adapted to Revis Hill include whitetail deer, turkey vultures and bank swallows. The Illinois Nature Preserves Commission advises visitors to be on the lookout for bluebirds, western hognose snakes, and prairie walking stick insects. In the 2002 butterfly count, butterfly species such as great spangled fritillary, wood satyr, zebra swallowtails, summer azures, and pearl crescents were observed.

== See also ==
- Fults Hill Prairie State Natural Area
