= Lakewood, Illinois (disambiguation) =

Lakewood, Illinois may refer to:

- Lakewood, Illinois, a village in McHenry County
- Lakewood, DuPage County, Illinois, an unincorporated community
- Lakewood, Mason County, Illinois, an unincorporated community
- Lakewood, Shelby County, Illinois, an unincorporated community
