= Havana Township =

Havana Township may refer to the following townships in the United States:

- Havana Township, Steele County, Minnesota
- Havana Township, Mason County, Illinois
