= Allens Grove Township =

Allens Grove Township may refer to the following townships in the United States:

- Allens Grove Township, Mason County, Illinois
- Allens Grove Township, Scott County, Iowa
