= Manito Mitchell Airport =

- IATA: none; ICAO: none; FAA LID: IL45 (formerly C45)

Summary
- Airport type: Public
- Owner: Palmer Flying Service
- Operator: Eric Ray
- Serves: Manito, Illinois
- Elevation AMSL: 501 ft / 153 m
- Coordinates: 40°29′22″N 89°46′41″W

Maps
- Location of Tazewell County in Illinois

- Location of airport in Tazewell County

Runways
Direction	Length		Surface
Direction	ft	m	Surface
4/22	2,784	849	Asphalt
18/36	2,188	667	Asphalt/turf

Statistics (2009)
- Aircraft operations: 6,000
- Based aircraft: 12
- Source: Federal Aviation Administration

Manito Mitchell Airport (FAA LID: IL45 (formerly C45)) is a privately owned, formerly-public-use airport in Tazewell County, Illinois, United States. It is located three nautical miles (3.5 mi; 5.6 km) north of the central business district of Manito, a village in Mason County. The airport has been converted to a private-use airport known as Palmer Flying Service Airport.

== Facilities and aircraft ==
Manito Mitchell Airport covers an area of 80 acres (32 ha) at an elevation of 501 feet (153 m) above mean sea level. It has two runways: 4/22 is 2,784 by 40 feet (849 by 12 m) with an asphalt pavement; 18/36 is 2,188 by 40 feet (667 by 12 m) with an asphalt and turf surface.

For the 12-month period ending December 31, 2009, the airport had 6,000 aircraft operations, an average of 16 per day: 97% general aviation and 3% military. At that time there were 12 single-engine aircraft based at this airport.
