= Manito, Illinois =

- Village
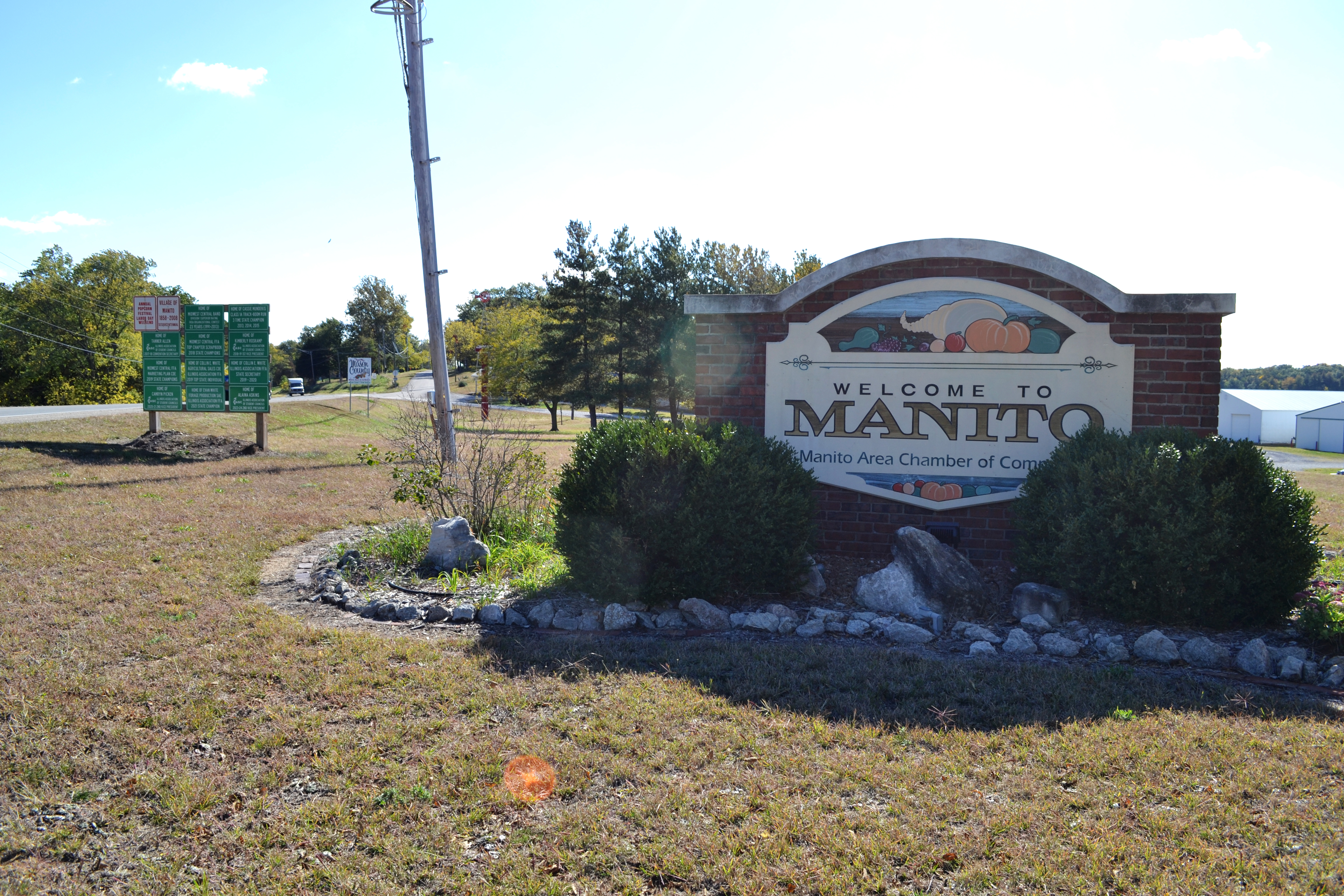
- Manito sign on north side of town

- Location in Mason County, Illinois
- Coordinates: 40°25′12″N 89°46′50″W
- Country: United States
- State: Illinois
- County: Mason
- Township: Manito
- Established: 1858 as Egypt
- Renamed: 1861 as Manito
- Named after: Manitou

Government
  - Mayor: Timothy W. Sondag

Area
  - Total: 1.51 sq mi (3.92 km^{2})
  - Land: 1.51 sq mi (3.92 km^{2})
  - Water: 0 sq mi (0.00 km^{2})
- Elevation: 495 ft (151 m)

Population (2020)
  - Total: 1,552
  - Estimate (2024): 1,487
  - Density: 1,026.0/sq mi (396.14/km^{2})
- Time zone: UTC-6 (CST)
  - Summer (DST): UTC-5 (CDT)
- ZIP code: 61546
- Area code: 309
- FIPS code: 17-46383
- GNIS ID: 2399241
- Website: villageofmanito.com

Manito is a village in Mason County, Illinois, United States. The population was 1,552 at the 2020 census, down from 1,642 in 2010.

== History ==
The area was first settled in 1850 and 110 plots of land were created by 1858. The following year the Illinois River Railroad, an early predecessor of the Chicago, Peoria and St. Louis Railroad, was completed and spurred in an increase in local trade. The settlement was originally named Black Hawk Grove but was later changed to Manito. The name originates from the Algonquian word 'Manitou' or 'manitō' and refers to the fundamental life force believed by certain Native peoples. The first village post office was established under the name Egypt on February 12, 1858, before being changed to its current name on November 4, 1861. Manito was incorporated as a village in 1877.

The Manito Historical Society was formed in 1978 after rumors that the Old Manito Jail was to be demolished. The year in which the jail was completed seems to have been lost. However, it was likely completed prior to 1900. It was moved to its current location in the 1990s for preservation. The society's headquarters is located nextdoor to the jail in the Old Red Schoolhouse (built 1858) at 204 W State St.

== Geography ==
Manito is located in northeastern Mason County. The northernmost border of the village follows the Tazewell County line. Manito is 5 miles (8 km) northeast of Forest City and 20 miles (32 km) northeast of Havana, the Mason county seat. Manito is 27 miles (43 km) southwest of Peoria.

According to the U.S. Census Bureau, Manito has a total area of 1.51 square miles (3.91 km^{2}), all land.

== Demographics ==
Historical population
| Census | Pop. | Note | %± |
|---|---|---|---|
| 1870 | 375 | | — |
| 1880 | 434 | | 15.7% |
| 1890 | 444 | | 2.3% |
| 1900 | 561 | | 26.4% |
| 1910 | 696 | | 24.1% |
| 1920 | 758 | | 8.9% |
| 1930 | 711 | | −6.2% |
| 1940 | 776 | | 9.1% |
| 1950 | 869 | | 12.0% |
| 1960 | 1,093 | | 25.8% |
| 1970 | 1,334 | | 22.0% |
| 1980 | 1,869 | | 40.1% |
| 1990 | 1,711 | | −8.5% |
| 2000 | 1,733 | | 1.3% |
| 2010 | 1,642 | | −5.3% |
| 2020 | 1,552 | | −5.5% |
U.S. Decennial Census

=== 2020 census ===
As of the 2020 census, Manito had a population of 1,552. The median age was 42.8 years. 22.6% of residents were under the age of 18 and 24.0% of residents were 65 years of age or older. For every 100 females there were 96.7 males, and for every 100 females age 18 and over there were 92.0 males age 18 and over.

0.0% of residents lived in urban areas, while 100.0% lived in rural areas.

There were 644 households in Manito, of which 28.4% had children under the age of 18 living in them. Of all households, 47.8% were married-couple households, 17.2% were households with a male householder and no spouse or partner present, and 25.9% were households with a female householder and no spouse or partner present. About 32.0% of all households were made up of individuals and 18.6% had someone living alone who was 65 years of age or older.

There were 738 housing units, of which 12.7% were vacant. The homeowner vacancy rate was 2.4% and the rental vacancy rate was 19.4%.

Racial composition as of the 2020 census
| Race | Number | Percent |
|---|---|---|
| White | 1,479 | 95.3% |
| Black or African American | 3 | 0.2% |
| American Indian and Alaska Native | 2 | 0.1% |
| Asian | 3 | 0.2% |
| Native Hawaiian and Other Pacific Islander | 0 | 0.0% |
| Some other race | 4 | 0.3% |
| Two or more races | 61 | 3.9% |
| Hispanic or Latino (of any race) | 33 | 2.1% |

=== 2000 census ===
As of the census of 2000, there were 1,733 people, 686 households, and 506 families residing in the village. The population density was 1,126.0 inhabitants per square mile (434.8/km^{2}). There were 723 housing units at an average density of 469.8 per square mile (181.4/km^{2}). The racial makeup of the village was 99.08% White, 0.23% African American, 0.17% Native American, 0.17% Asian, and 0.35% from two or more races. Hispanic or Latino of any race were 0.29% of the population.

There were 686 households, out of which 32.9% had children under the age of 18 living with them, 61.8% were married couples living together, 9.0% had a female householder with no husband present, and 26.1% were non-families. 22.0% of all households were made up of individuals, and 10.8% had someone living alone who was 65 years of age or older. The average household size was 2.52 and the average family size was 2.93.

In the village, the population was spread out, with 25.0% under the age of 18, 8.1% from 18 to 24, 27.6% from 25 to 44, 25.6% from 45 to 64, and 13.8% who were 65 years of age or older. The median age was 37 years. For every 100 females, there were 102.5 males. For every 100 females age 18 and over, there were 92.6 males.

The median income for a household in the village was $41,767, and the median income for a family was $48,438. Males had a median income of $36,927 versus $21,506 for females. The per capita income for the village was $18,345. About 5.4% of families and 8.2% of the population were below the poverty line, including 8.3% of those under age 18 and 6.3% of those age 65 or over.

== Transportation ==
Palmer Flying Service Airport, formerly Manito Mitchell Airport, is a privately owned airport in Tazewell County, 5 miles (8 km) north of Manito's central business district.

== Notable people ==
- Henry Alfred Clauser, guitarist, songwriter and engineer featured on radio shows
- Joseph E. Daily, Chief Justice of the Illinois Supreme Court; born in Manito
- Helen Heckman, dancer, born in Manito
- H. V. Porter, educator and member of the Naismith Memorial Basketball Hall of Fame
