= Rockwell Mound =

Archaeological site in Illinois, United States

- U.S. National Register of Historic Places
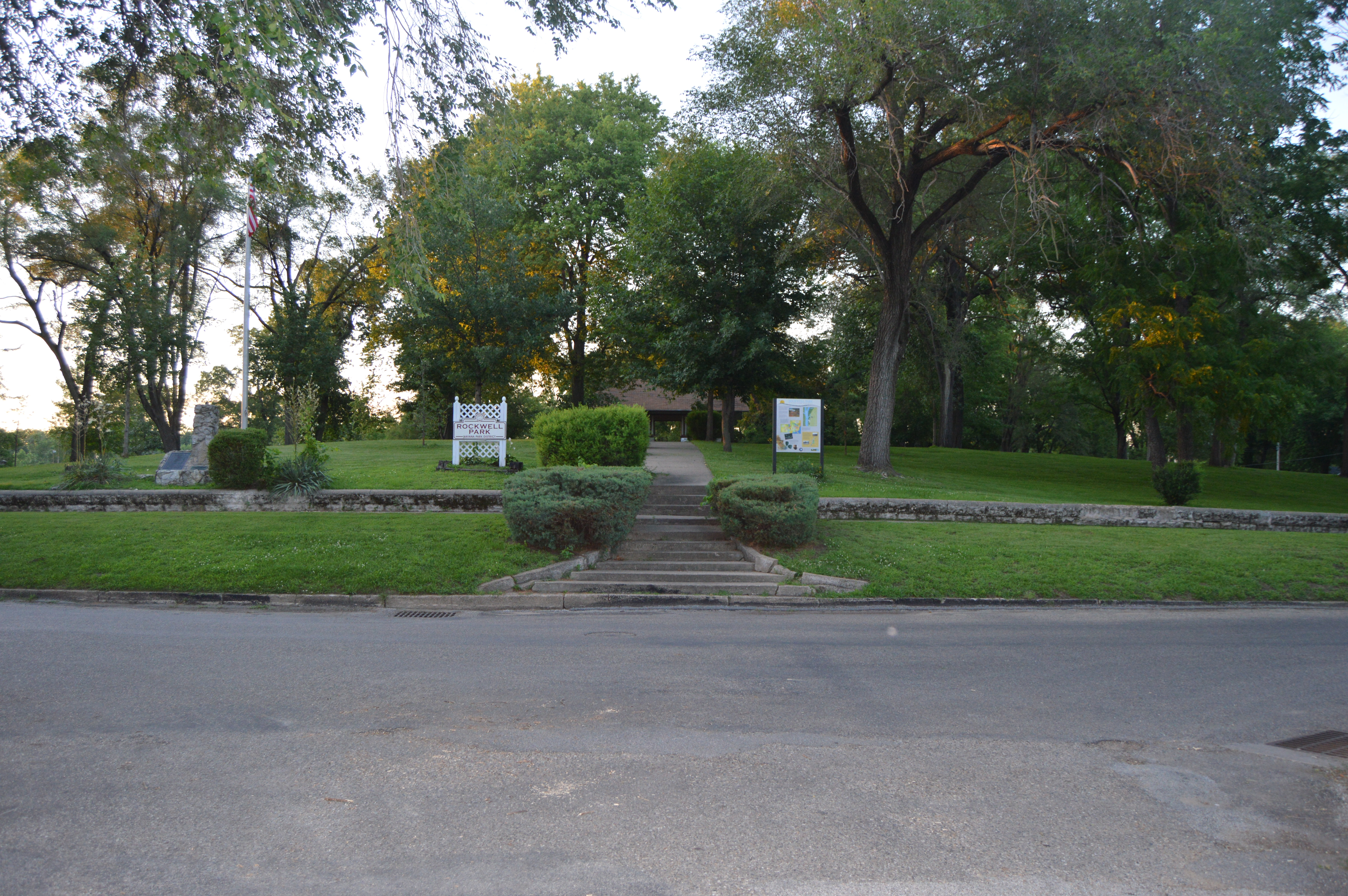
- Looking toward the mound from the south

- Location within Illinois Location within the United States
- Location: Havana, Mason County, Illinois
- Coordinates: 40°18′17.19″N 90°3′49.13″W
- Area: 3 acres (1.2 ha)
- Built: AD 200
- NRHP reference No.: 87000679
- Added to NRHP: December 10, 1987

Rockwell Mound has been listed on the National Register of Historic Places since 1987. The mound is located in Rockwell Park, on North Orange Street in the Illinois River city of Havana in Mason County.

Rockwell Mound is one of the site that the Register has denoted as being "address restricted" because of its special sensitivity. Despite this designation by the Register the mound is operated as a park as of 2007.

== History ==
Rockwell Mound is one of the largest mounds ever built in the Illinois River basin. The earthen mound dates to around AD 200, covers almost 2 acres (8,100 m^{2}), and is about 12 feet (3.7 m) tall. The park that is on the site today is about six miles (10 km) from another Mississippian site on the Register in Illinois, Dickson Mounds.

== See also ==
- List of archaeological sites on the National Register of Historic Places in Illinois
