= Paul Samuell =

American judge

Henry Paul Samuell
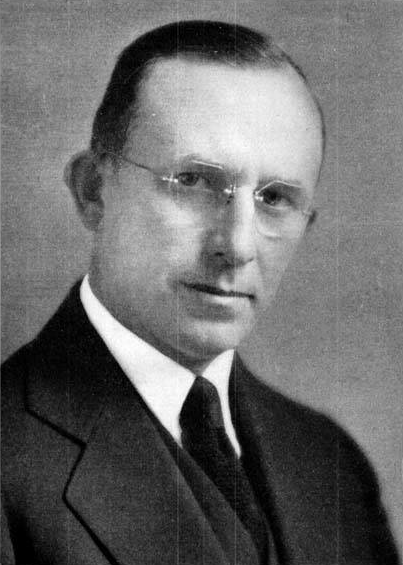
- Samuell's official photograph, c. 1929.
- Born: October 2, 1886; Havana, Illinois
- Died: March 21, 1938 (aged 51); Jacksonville, Illinois
- Occupations: Jurist; lawyer
- Political party: Republican

Henry Paul Samuell (October 2, 1886 – March 21, 1938) was an American jurist and lawyer.

Born on a farm near Havana, Illinois, in Mason County, Illinois, Samuell went to Illinois College and then received his degree from Illinois Wesleyan University in 1910. Samuell was admitted to the Illinois and Montana bars. Samuell practiced law in Montana for three years before returning to Jacksonville, Illinois where he practiced law. In 1916, Samuell served as county judge. In 1929, Samuell was appointed to the Illinois Supreme Court and was defeated for election in 1930. Samuell was a Republican. Samuell died at his home in Jacksonville, Illinois.
