= IL-10 =

Interleukin 10 (Il-10) is an anti-inflammatory cytokine. IL-10 may also refer to:

- Ilyushin Il-10, a Soviet aircraft of World War II
- Interleukin 10, an anti-inflammatory cytokine
- Illinois's 10th congressional district
- Illinois Route 10
