= Sand Ridge State Forest =

State forest in Illinois, United States

- IUCN category VI (protected area with sustainable use of natural resources)
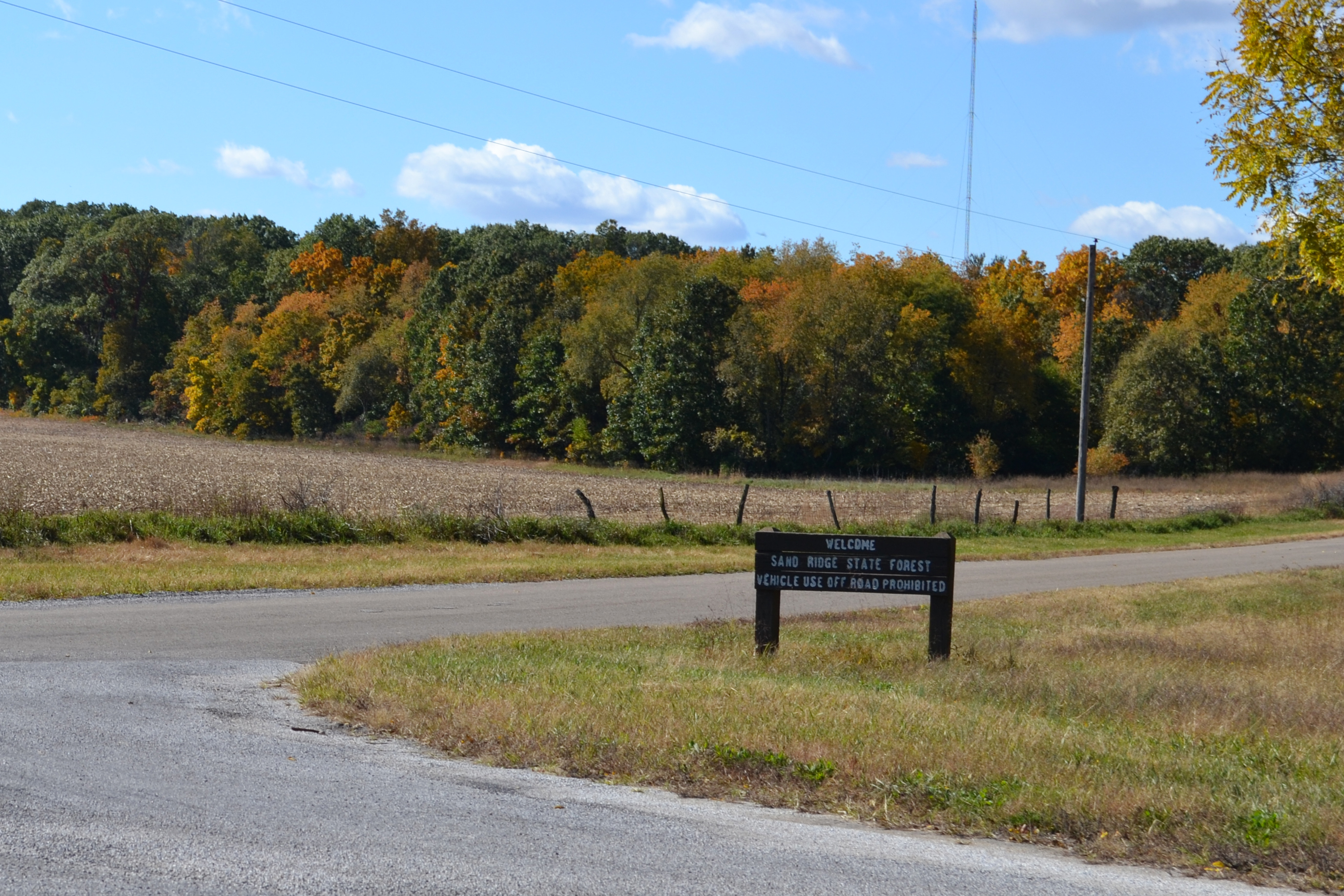
- Sand Ridge State Forest entrance sign

- Location within Illinois
- Location: Mason County, Illinois, USA
- Nearest city: Forest City, Illinois
- Coordinates: 40°24′41″N 89°51′58″W
- Area: 7,200 acres (2,900 ha)
- Established: 1939
- Governing body: Illinois Department of Natural Resources

Sand Ridge State Forest is a conservation area located in the U.S. state of Illinois. Containing 7,200 acres (2,900 ha), it is the largest state forest in Illinois. It is located in northern Mason County. The nearest town is Manito, Illinois, and the nearest numbered highway is U.S. Highway 136. It is located on a low bluff, or "sand ridge", overlooking the Illinois River, hence the name.

== Geology ==
The sand ridge is believed to be an artifact of the post-glacial Kankakee Torrent, a flood that deposited sand from the Kankakee area via the Kankakee River and Illinois River. It is the result of a prehistoric dry, desert-like period and a 1,000 year drought. About 5% of the state's land surface consists of sand regions from the Wisconsian glaciation. Other major regions of sand in Illinois include: Kankakee Sands, Green River lowlands in northwestern Illinois, the Chicago Lake Plain, and Lake County beaches along Lake Michigan.

The soil of Sand Ridge State Forest is 89% sand, 8% clay, and 3% silt. There are two types of sand, red and yellow. Dunes and swales were created after sand was deposited, but before vegetation could grow, during what is called the Parkland Formation. Dunes range from 6 m (20 ft) up to 30 m (98 ft). The site also features dry land savannas.

A large forest developed on the sand dunes until European settlement in the 1830s. Early settlers tried to farm the land, but agriculture on the deep, sandy soil proved difficult and most farms were abandoned by the 1930s.

== History ==
The Sand Ridge State Forest largely dates back to 1939, when the state of Illinois purchased 5,504 acres (2,227 ha) of submarginal sandy farmland for conservation purposes and an experimental forest. The Civilian Conservation Corps planted pine trees on much of the land. The former name was Mason State Forest. In 1971, the Division of Land Management took over management of the forest and renamed it Sand Ridge State Forest.

The Sand Ridge State Forest contains the Clear Lake Site, an archeological site listed on the National Register of Historic Places on November 28, 1978.

On April 25–27, 1962, a forest fire burned over 1,500 acres (610 ha).

In 1990 to 1994, controlled burns were studied at Sand Ridge State Forest as a method to control invasive garlic mustard; it helped prevent the spread, but did not eradicate the invasive weed species.

In March 2012, 375 acres (152 ha) burned in a forest fire caused by a man burning brush in high winds which sparked the trees. Firefighters from 14 departments in Logan, Tazewell, and Mason counties were called.

== Natural features ==
=== Flora ===
Today, the 7,200-acre (2,900 ha) state forest contains 3,916 acres (1,585 ha) of dryland oak-hickory woodlands, 2,492 acres (1,008 ha) of pine woodlands, and 792 acres (321 ha) of open fields and sand prairies. Black oak is the dominant species, with blackjack oak and red hickory, and a woody understory of poison ivy, fragrant sumac, prickly ash, and gray dogwood.

Sand Ridge State Forest is the largest area of sand-dominated plants managed by the state of Illinois. A 2013 study of vascular plants found 141 non-native (exotic) species in the state forest. Endemic species include the prickly pear cactus (Opuntia), that may be more familiar to Mexicans and residents of the U.S. Southwest.

Little bluestem, leadplant, green milkweed, butterfly-weed, purple coneflower, colic root, grass pink orchid, silvery bladderpod, bearberry, and winged sumac can all be found in the sand prairie habitat.

Two endangered species, bent milk vetch (Astragalus distortus) and silver bladderpod (Lesquerella ludoviciana) and one threatened species, sand prairie flatsedge (Cyperus grayoides Mohlenbr), were recorded in a 2013 study. Another study from 2011 found approximately 70 endangered and threatened species, of which 40 are restricted to glacial drift sand habitats.

=== Fauna ===
==== Insects and arachnids ====
In June 1985, Sand Ridge State Forest provided a male specimen of a new species of wolf spider for study. The forest has also been the site of studies for other animals such as the robber fly, wasps, and bumblebees.

==== Fish ====
===== Jake Wolf Memorial Fish Hatchery =====
The Jake Wolf Memorial Fish Hatchery is a 160 acres (65 ha) site that is located in the northwest corner of Sand Ridge State Forest. It is the largest of three hatcheries in Illinois. Initially called the Sand Ridge Hatchery, the facility broke ground on December 3, 1979. Fish production began in 1983. In 1985, the facility was renamed after the late Jacob John "Jake" Wolf, former deputy director of Conservation. In 1993, a visitor center was completed. In its first decade of production, the hatchery stocked over 100 million fish around Illinois. Since 1983, the hatchery has produced over 500 million fish of 21 species.

The hatchery currently rears 16 species of cold, cool, and warm water fish. Cold water species include: brown trout, Chinook salmon, coho salmon, rainbow trout, and steelhead trout. Cool water species include: muskellunge, northern pike and walleye. Warm water species include: alligator gar, black crappie, bluegill, channel catfish, hybrid striped bass, largemouth bass, redear sunfish, and smallmouth bass.

==== Reptiles and amphibians ====
Strecker's chorus frog, yellow mud turtle, gopher snake, and plains hog-nosed snake can be found in Sand Ridge State Forest.

==== Birds ====
Bird species include: northern harrier, rough-legged hawk, red-breasted nuthatch, brown creeper, dark-eyed junco, American goldfinch, red-tailed hawk, yellow-billed cuckoo, whip-poor-will, red-headed woodpecker, northern flicker, eastern wood pewee, house wren, gray catbird, red-eyed vireo, summer tanager, and rose-breasted grosbeak. Peoria Audubon Society has spotted over 200 species of bird in the forest.

==== Mammals ====
Species such as badger and pocket gopher can also be found in the forest.

== Recreation ==
Sand Ridge is managed by the Illinois Department of Natural Resources (IDNR) as open space for active recreational purposes, especially whitetail deer hunting. Revis Hill Prairie, also located within Mason County, is operated by IDNR as a disjunct area of Sand Ridge State Forest.

Camping is available at Sand Ridge State Forest; 27 Class "C" sites at Pine Campground, 12 back-country primitive sites, and an open space at the Oak Campground are available. Horseman's Park Campground offers Class C camping for equestrians, with 50 miles of trails and over 120 miles of fire lanes.

Forty-four miles of marked hiking trails, in addition to the 120 miles of fire lanes, are available. There are 26 miles of designating trails for snowmobiling with a minimum of 4 inches of snow.

Hunting is permitted on 6,600 acres (2,700 ha) for deer, red fox, gray fox, coyote, squirrel, raccoon, quail, pheasant, woodcock, and dove.

== See also ==
- Sand Prairie-Scrub Oak State Nature Preserve
