= Mason County Courthouse =

Mason County Courthouse may refer to:

- Mason County Courthouse (Michigan), Ludington, Michigan
- Mason County Courthouse (Texas), Mason, Texas
- Mason County Courthouse (Illinois), Havana, Illinois
- Marion County Courthouse (West Virginia), Fairmont, West Virginia
- Mason County Courthouse (Washington), Shelton, Washington, listed on the National Register of Historic Places
