= Fults =

Fults may refer to:-

- Fults, Illinois, a village
- The Fults Hill Prairie State Natural Area
- Ralph Fults, depression era outlaw and escape artist
