= Forest City, Illinois =

- Village
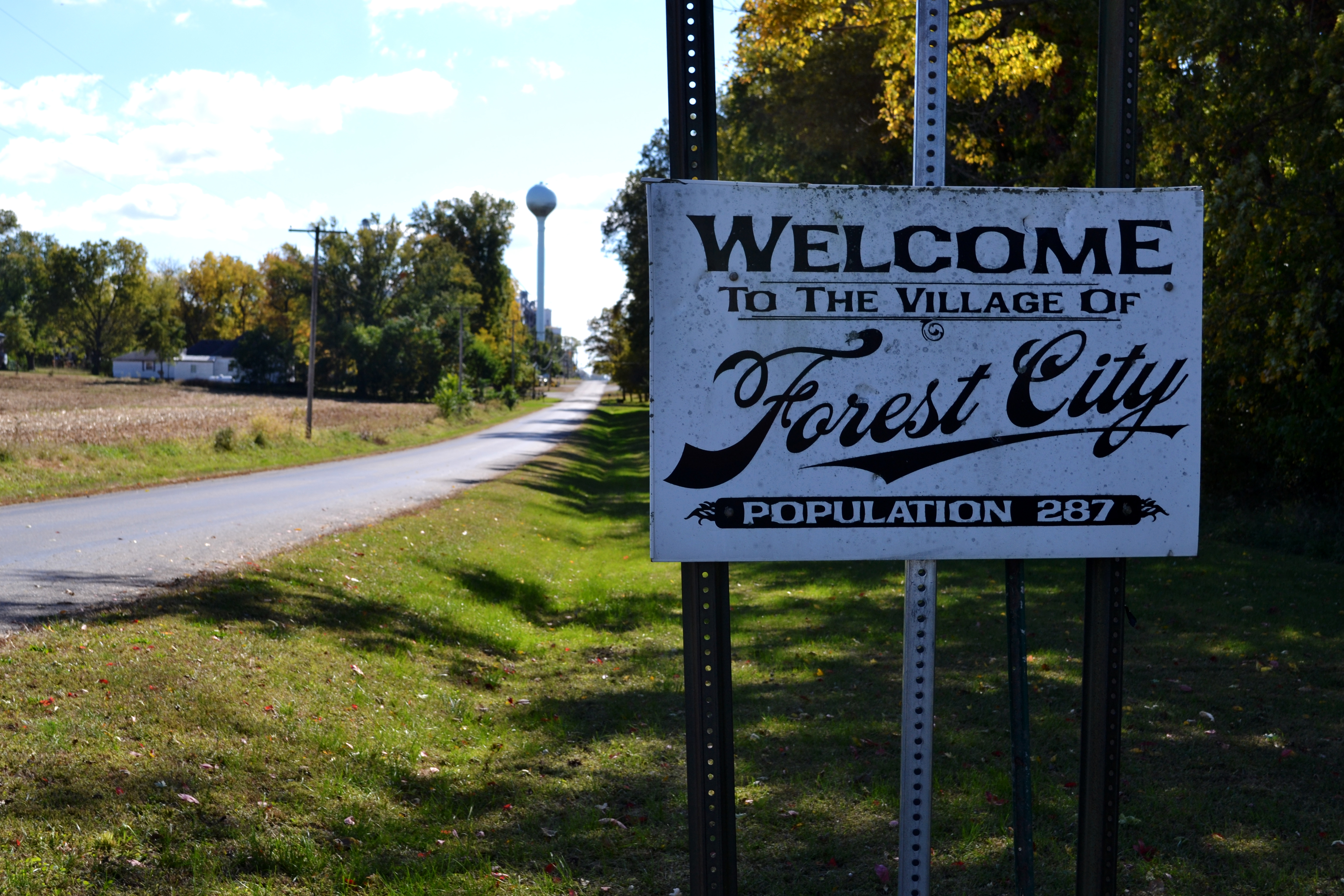

- Location in Mason County, Illinois
- Coordinates: 40°22′23″N 89°49′58″W
- Country: United States
- State: Illinois
- County: Mason
- Township: Forest City
- Founded by: Alexander Cross

Government
  - Body: Village Board

Area
  - Total: 0.52 sq mi (1.35 km^{2})
  - Land: 0.52 sq mi (1.35 km^{2})
  - Water: 0 sq mi (0.00 km^{2})
- Elevation: 492 ft (150 m)

Population (2020)
  - Total: 222
  - Density: 420/sq mi (164/km^{2})
- Time zone: UTC-6 (CST)
  - Summer (DST): UTC-5 (CDT)
- ZIP code: 61532
- Area code: 309
- FIPS code: 17-26753
- GNIS ID: 2398895

Forest City is a village in Mason County, Illinois, United States. The population was 222 at the 2020 census.

== Geography ==
Forest City is located in northern Mason County 16 miles (26 km) northeast of Havana, the county seat, and 15 miles (24 km) northwest of San Jose.

According to the U.S. Census Bureau, Forest City has a total area of 0.52 square miles (1.35 km^{2}), all land. Sand Ridge State Forest occupies hilly country to the northwest.

== Demographics ==
Historical population
Census	Pop.	Note	%±
1880	182		—
1900	309		—
1910	306		−1.0%
1920	314		2.6%
1930	269		−14.3%
1940	240		−10.8%
1950	278		15.8%
1960	249		−10.4%
1970	301		20.9%
1980	298		−1.0%
1990	321		7.7%
2000	287		−10.6%
2010	246		−14.3%
2020	222		−9.8%
U.S. Decennial Census

As of the census of 2000, there were 287 people, 101 households, and 81 families residing in the village. The population density was 547.8 inhabitants per square mile (211.5/km^{2}). There were 105 housing units at an average density of 200.4 per square mile (77.4/km^{2}). The racial makeup of the village was 98.61% White, 1.05% Native American, and 0.35% from two or more races.

There were 101 households, out of which 32.7% had children under the age of 18 living with them, 73.3% were married couples living together, 5.0% had a female householder with no husband present, and 19.8% were non-families. 13.9% of all households were made up of individuals, and 5.9% had someone living alone who was 65 years of age or older. The average household size was 2.84 and the average family size was 3.14.

In the village, the population was spread out, with 27.2% under the age of 18, 11.8% from 18 to 24, 26.8% from 25 to 44, 21.6% from 45 to 64, and 12.5% who were 65 years of age or older. The median age was 36 years. For every 100 females, there were 114.2 males. For every 100 females age 18 and over, there were 111.1 males.

The median income for a household in the village was $36,250, and the median income for a family was $35,625. Males had a median income of $27,000 versus $15,000 for females. The per capita income for the village was $13,855. About 4.3% of families and 8.0% of the population were below the poverty line, including 8.6% of those under the age of eighteen and none of those 65 or over.
