= Salt Creek Township, Mason County, Illinois =

Salt Creek Township
- Township

- Location of Illinois in the United States
- Coordinates: 40°10′36″N 89°46′09″W
- Country: United States
- State: Illinois
- County: Mason
- Settled: November 5, 1861

Area
  - Total: 36 sq mi (93 km^{2})
  - Land: 35.82 sq mi (92.8 km^{2})
  - Water: 0.18 sq mi (0.47 km^{2})
- Elevation: 584 ft (178 m)

Population (2010)
  - Estimate (2016): 212
  - Density: 6.4/sq mi (2.5/km^{2})
- Time zone: UTC-6 (CST)
  - Summer (DST): UTC-5 (CDT)
- FIPS code: 17-125-67353

Salt Creek Township is located in Mason County, Illinois, United States. As of the 2010 census, its population was 228 and it contained 96 housing units.

== Geography ==
According to the 2010 census, the township has a total area of 36 square miles (93 km^{2}), of which 35.82 square miles (92.8 km^{2}) (or 99.50%) is land and 0.18 square miles (0.47 km^{2}) (or 0.50%) is water.

== Demographics ==
Historical population
Census	Pop.	Note	%±
2016 (est.)	212
U.S. Decennial Census
