= Joseph E. Daily =

American judge

Joseph Earl Daily
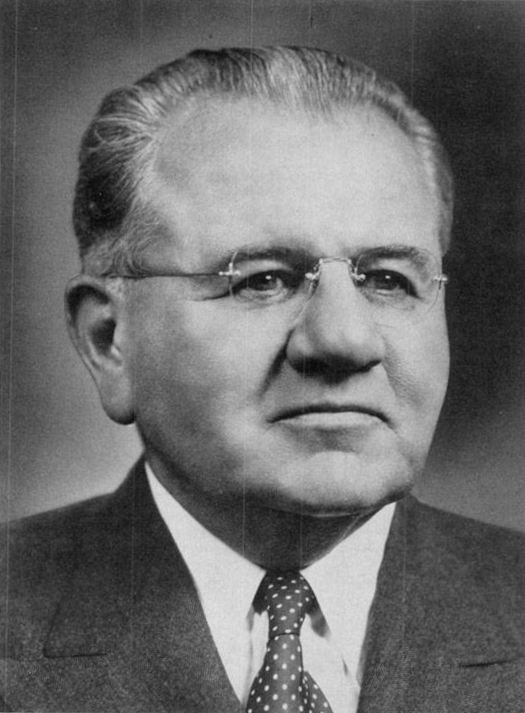
- Daily's official photograph, c. 1953.
- Born: January 27, 1888; Manito, Illinois
- Died: July 1, 1965 (aged 77); Chicago, Illinois
- Occupation: Judge

Joseph Earl Daily (January 27, 1888 – July 1, 1965) was an American jurist.

Born in Manito, Illinois, Daily received his law degree from Yale Law School. Daily then practiced law in Peoria, Illinois in 1909. In 1911, Daily was elected Peoria city attorney and was a Republican. From 1926 to 1948, Daily served as Illinois circuit court judge. From 1948 until his death in 1965, Daily served on the Illinois Supreme Court and was chief justice of the court. Daily died in a hospital in Chicago, Illinois following surgery.
