= Clyde E. Stone =

American judge

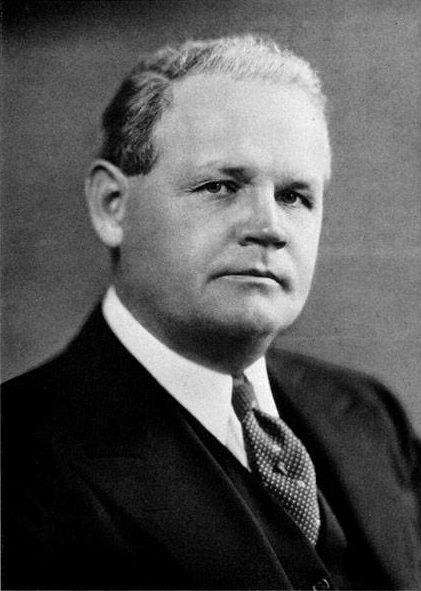

Justice of the Illinois Supreme Court
- In office 1918 – January 14, 1948

Personal details
- Born: March 23, 1876; Mason City, Illinois
- Died: January 14, 1948 (aged 71); Tucson, Arizona
- Political party: Republican
- Occupation: Jurist

Clyde Ernest Stone (March 23, 1876 – January 14, 1948) was an American jurist.

== Biography ==
Born near Mason City, Illinois, Stone graduated from Mason City High School and received his bachelor's degree from University of Illinois. He taught school for six years and then started practicing law in Peoria, Illinois in 1903 after being admitted to the Illinois bar. Stone was an assistant state's attorney. Stone served as county judge and then circuit court judge. He was a Republican. In 1918, Stone was elected to the Illinois Supreme Court and served until his death in 1948. Stone was chief justice of the court. Stone died of a stroke in Tucson, Arizona while on vacation.
