= Bath, Illinois =

- Village
- Location in Mason County, Illinois
- Coordinates: 40°11′26″N 90°08′33″W
- Country: United States
- State: Illinois
- County: Mason
- Township: Bath

Area
  - Total: 0.37 sq mi (0.95 km^{2})
  - Land: 0.36 sq mi (0.94 km^{2})
  - Water: 0 sq mi (0.00 km^{2})
- Elevation: 459 ft (140 m)

Population (2020)
  - Total: 279
  - Density: 765/sq mi (295.5/km^{2})
- Time zone: UTC-6 (CST)
  - Summer (DST): UTC-5 (CDT)
- ZIP code: 62617
- Area code: 309
- FIPS code: 17-04156
- GNIS ID: 2398050

Bath is a village in Mason County, Illinois, United States. The population was 279 at the 2020 census.

== History ==
The area was first settled in 1828 by John Stewart and John Gillespie from the state of Kentucky. Future 16th president of the United States, Abraham Lincoln, surveyed the land on November 1, 1836. The settlement's name was most likely borrowed from another United States place named in turn after Bath, England, such as Bath, Ohio or Bath, New York. Alternatively, a popular story attributes the name to Lincoln quipping that the town's location on the Illinois River would be a nice place for a bath. Bath also became the name of the township when it was formed in 1861.

The community was incorporated by charter in 1857. In 1876, after the adoption of the Illinois Constitution of 1870, it was reincorporated as a village under the general incorporation law.

The village is home to the Gatton Mansion at 9805 IL-78. Built c. 1856, it was the home of Major Benjamin Gatton (b. 1808) of Kentucky. Gatton served as the settlement's first postmaster when it was established in 1842. The two story house contains 16 rooms, two center halls, and once a large pool. Gatton is noted as being alive in 1876 but is thought to have died not long after and the home became property of the Blakely family for decades. The home was used by multiple owners before being abandoned in the 1990s. In 2017 new owners attempted to restore the property and convert the home into a distillery. However, the price of the restoration was underestimated and the project was abandoned only a year later.

== Geography ==
Bath is in southwestern Mason County, on a low bluff overlooking the Illinois River valley to the west. Illinois Route 78 passes through the village center as Oak Street, leading northeast (upriver) 9 miles (14 km) to Havana, the county seat, and south 10 miles (16 km) to Chandlerville.

According to the U.S. Census Bureau, Bath has a total area of 0.36 square miles (0.93 km^{2}), all land. The East Branch of the Illinois River, a channel that forms the east side of Grand Island, serves as the northwest border of the village.

== Demographics ==
Historical population
Census	Pop.	Note	%±
1850	336		—
1860	513		52.7%
1870	464		−9.6%
1880	439		−5.4%
1890	384		−12.5%
1900	330		−14.1%
1910	475		43.9%
1920	408		−14.1%
1930	346		−15.2%
1940	358		3.5%
1950	423		18.2%
1960	398		−5.9%
1970	422		6.0%
1980	475		12.6%
1990	388		−18.3%
2000	310		−20.1%
2010	333		7.4%
2020	279		−16.2%
U.S. Decennial Census

As of the census of 2000, there were 310 people, 130 households, and 86 families residing in the village. The population density was 848.9 inhabitants per square mile (327.8/km^{2}). There were 153 housing units at an average density of 419.0 units per square mile (161.8 units/km^{2}). The racial makeup of the village was 96.45% White, 0.32% African American, 0.97% Native American, and 2.26% from two or more races. Hispanic or Latino of any race were 0.32% of the population.

There were 130 households, out of which 28.5% had children under the age of 18 living with them, 46.2% were married couples living together, 16.2% had a female householder with no husband present, and 33.8% were non-families. 32.3% of all households were made up of individuals, and 10.8% had someone living alone who was 65 years of age or older. The average household size was 2.38 and the average family size was 2.95.

In the village, the population was spread out, with 27.4% under the age of 18, 8.7% from 18 to 24, 25.5% from 25 to 44, 23.2% from 45 to 64, and 15.2% who were 65 years of age or older. The median age was 34 years. For every 100 females, there were 96.2 males. For every 100 females age 18 and over, there were 89.1 males.

The median income for a household in the village was $30,208, and the median income for a family was $31,875. Males had a median income of $27,250 versus $18,750 for females. The per capita income for the village was $10,262. About 22.2% of families and 24.7% of the population were below the poverty line, including 37.7% of those under the age of eighteen and 3.2% of those 65 or over.

== Events ==
Bath is host to the annual midsummer Redneck Fishing Tournament.

== Notable people ==
- Mark Clark, pitcher for several Major League Baseball teams; grew up in Bath
