= Pennsylvania Township, Mason County, Illinois =

Pennsylvania Township
- Township

- Location of Illinois in the United States
- Coordinates: 40°16′21″N 89°45′56″W
- Country: United States
- State: Illinois
- County: Mason
- Settled: November 5, 1861

Area
  - Total: 35.85 sq mi (92.9 km^{2})
  - Land: 35.85 sq mi (92.9 km^{2})
  - Water: 0 sq mi (0 km^{2})
- Elevation: 509 ft (155 m)

Population (2010)
  - Estimate (2016): 191
  - Density: 5.7/sq mi (2.2/km^{2})
- Time zone: UTC-6 (CST)
  - Summer (DST): UTC-5 (CDT)
- FIPS code: 17-125-58629

Pennsylvania Township is located in Mason County, Illinois, United States. As of the 2010 census, its population was 206 and it contained 92 housing units.

== Geography ==
According to the 2010 census, the township has a total area of 35.85 square miles (92.9 km^{2}), all land.

== Demographics ==
Historical population
Census	Pop.	Note	%±
2016 (est.)	191
U.S. Decennial Census
