= Illinois Route 10 =

East-west state highway in Illinois, US

Illinois Route 10
- IL 10 highlighted in red

Route information
- Maintained by IDOT
- Length: 91.35 mi (147.01 km)
- Existed: November 5, 1918–present

Major junctions
- West end: US 136 in Easton
- I-55 / IL 121 in Lincoln; US 51 in Clinton; I-72 in White Heath
- East end: US 150 in Champaign

Location
- Country: United States
- State: Illinois
- Counties: Mason, Logan, De Witt, Piatt, Champaign

Highway system
- Illinois State Highway System; Interstate; US; State; Tollways; Scenic
← IL 9	→ US 12

Illinois Route 10 (IL 10) is an arterial east–west state highway that runs from rural Mason County east to Champaign, a distance of 91.35 miles (147.01 km).

== Route description ==
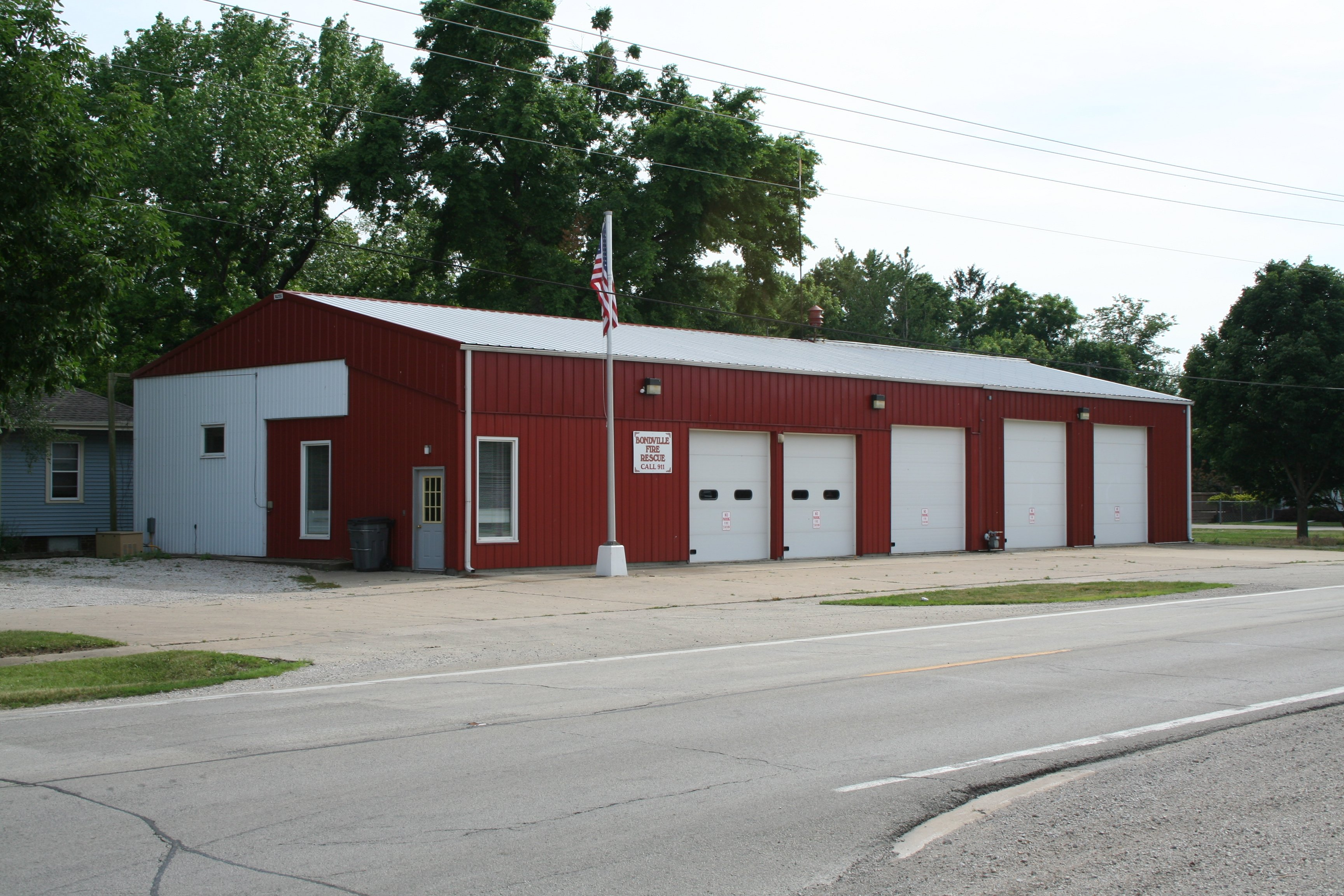
A view of the Bondville, Illinois fire station looking south west across Illinois Route 10.

Illinois 10 starts at US 136 about 12 miles east of Havana. The highway heads south to Easton, and then changes direction to reach Mason City and Lincoln. The highway passes through many small towns on the way to Champaign, and it runs through Clinton and by Clinton Lake. The highway closely parallels Interstate 72 for the last 10 miles before reaching US 150 in Champaign.

== History ==
Illinois 10 has undergone major changes since it was initially established. Originally, SBI Route 10 followed Interstate 72 much more closely and ran from Jacksonville to Danville. Over the years, it has been dropped from Jacksonville, reinstated in Decatur, dropped entirely west of Danville, reapplied and dropped in Havana and then finally reapplied east of I-72. This last revision was made in 1974.

== Major intersections ==
County	Location	mi	km	Destinations	Notes
Mason	Easton	0.0	0.0	US 136	
Mason	Mason City	11.7	18.8	IL 29	
Logan	Lincoln	28.5	45.9	I-55 to I-155 north – Bloomington, Springfield, Peoria IL 121 begins	West end of IL 121 overlap; northern terminus of IL 121; I-55 exit 126
Logan	Lincoln	30.2	48.6	I-55 BL (Lincoln Parkway)	
Logan	Lincoln	32.3	52.0	IL 121 south (Limit Street)	East end of IL 121 overlap
De Witt		51.7	83.2	US 51	
De Witt	Clinton	52.5	84.5	IL 54 west (Van Buren Street)	West end of IL 54 overlap
De Witt	Clinton	52.9	85.1	US 51 Bus. (Grant Street)	
De Witt	Clinton	53.4	85.9	IL 54 east	East end of IL 54 overlap
De Witt	Weldon	65.0	104.6	IL 48	
Piatt	White Heath	78.9	127.0	I-72 – Decatur, Champaign	I-72 exit 172
Champaign	Seymour	83.4	134.2	IL 47 north	southern terminus of IL 47
Champaign	Champaign	91.35	147.01	US 150 (Prospect Avenue, Springfield Avenue)	
1.000 mi = 1.609 km; 1.000 km = 0.621 mi: Concurrency terminus
