= Ruby K. Worner =

American chemist (1900–1955)

Ruby Kathryn Worner
- Born: 22 November 1900; San Jose, Illinois, United States
- Died: 15 April 1995 (aged 94); Peoria, Illinois, United States
- Resting place: Green Valley Cemetery, Tazewell County, Illinois, United States
- Education: University of Chicago
- Awards: Award of Merit from the American Society for Testing and Materials (ASTM)
- Scientific career
- Fields: Chemistry
- Workplaces: Oklahoma College for Women; U.S. Department of Agriculture (USDA); National Bureau of Standards; University of Alexandria
- Thesis: The Thermal Decomposition of Chloropentanmine Chromic Chloride (1925)

Ruby Kathryn Worner (22 November 1900 – 15 April 1995) was an American chemist and textiles expert.

== Biography ==
Worner was born on 22 November 1900 in San Jose, Illinois, United States. Her parents were Henry Worner and Mary Worner (née Kiesling) and she had two brothers.

Worner studied three degrees at the University of Chicago, graduating with a PhD in Chemistry in 1925. Her thesis was titled "The Thermal Decomposition of Chloropentanmine Chromic Chloride." After graduating, Worner taught at the Oklahoma College for Women (now the University of Science and Arts of Oklahoma) from 1925 to 1927.

Worner was then employed as a chemist in the federal service in Washington, D.C., working at the Bureau of Home Economics of the U.S. Department of Agriculture (USDA) and for the textile division of the National Bureau of Standards, performing testing on cotton and yarns. In 1938, she published the Effect of Purification Treatments on Cotton and Rayon for the National Bureau of Standards, alongside Ralph T. Mease.

In September 1939, Worner was sponsored by the American Chemical Society’s Division of Chemical Education to speak at a Symposium on Training and Opportunities for Women in Chemistry. She was a sponsor of the Federation of Women.

Worner worked as a visiting professor with the Fulbright Program at the University of Alexandria in Alexandria, Egypt, from September 1960 to June 1965.

Worner died on 15 April 1995 in Peoria, Illinois. Her archives are held at the University of Chicago Library.

== Honors and legacy ==
Worner received an Award of Merit from the American Society for Testing and Materials (ASTM) in 1964.

The Illinois Central College's Ruby K. Worner Scholarship, for students studying Agriculture, Mathematics, Chemistry or Physics, is named in her honour. The Ruby K. Worner Trust donated $20,000 to the Sigma Xi, The Scientific Research Honor Society in 2022.
