= Lynchburg Township, Mason County, Illinois =

Lynchburg Township
- Township

- Location of Illinois in the United States
- Coordinates: 40°05′52″N 90°13′44″W
- Country: United States
- State: Illinois
- County: Mason
- Settled: November 5, 1861

Area
  - Total: 49.77 sq mi (128.9 km^{2})
  - Land: 42.09 sq mi (109.0 km^{2})
  - Water: 7.68 sq mi (19.9 km^{2})
- Elevation: 459 ft (140 m)

Population (2010)
  - Estimate (2016): 256
  - Density: 6.6/sq mi (2.5/km^{2})
- Time zone: UTC-6 (CST)
  - Summer (DST): UTC-5 (CDT)
- FIPS code: 17-125-45265

Lynchburg Township is located in Mason County, Illinois, United States. As of the 2010 census, its population was 277 and it contained 246 housing units.

== Geography ==
According to the 2010 census, the township has a total area of 49.77 square miles (128.9 km^{2}), of which 42.09 square miles (109.0 km^{2}) (or 84.57%) is land and 7.68 square miles (19.9 km^{2}) (or 15.43%) is water.

== Demographics ==
Historical population
Census	Pop.	Note	%±
2016 (est.)	256
U.S. Decennial Census
