= Chautauqua National Wildlife Refuge =

National Wildlife Refuge in Illinois, US

- IUCN category IV (habitat/species management area)
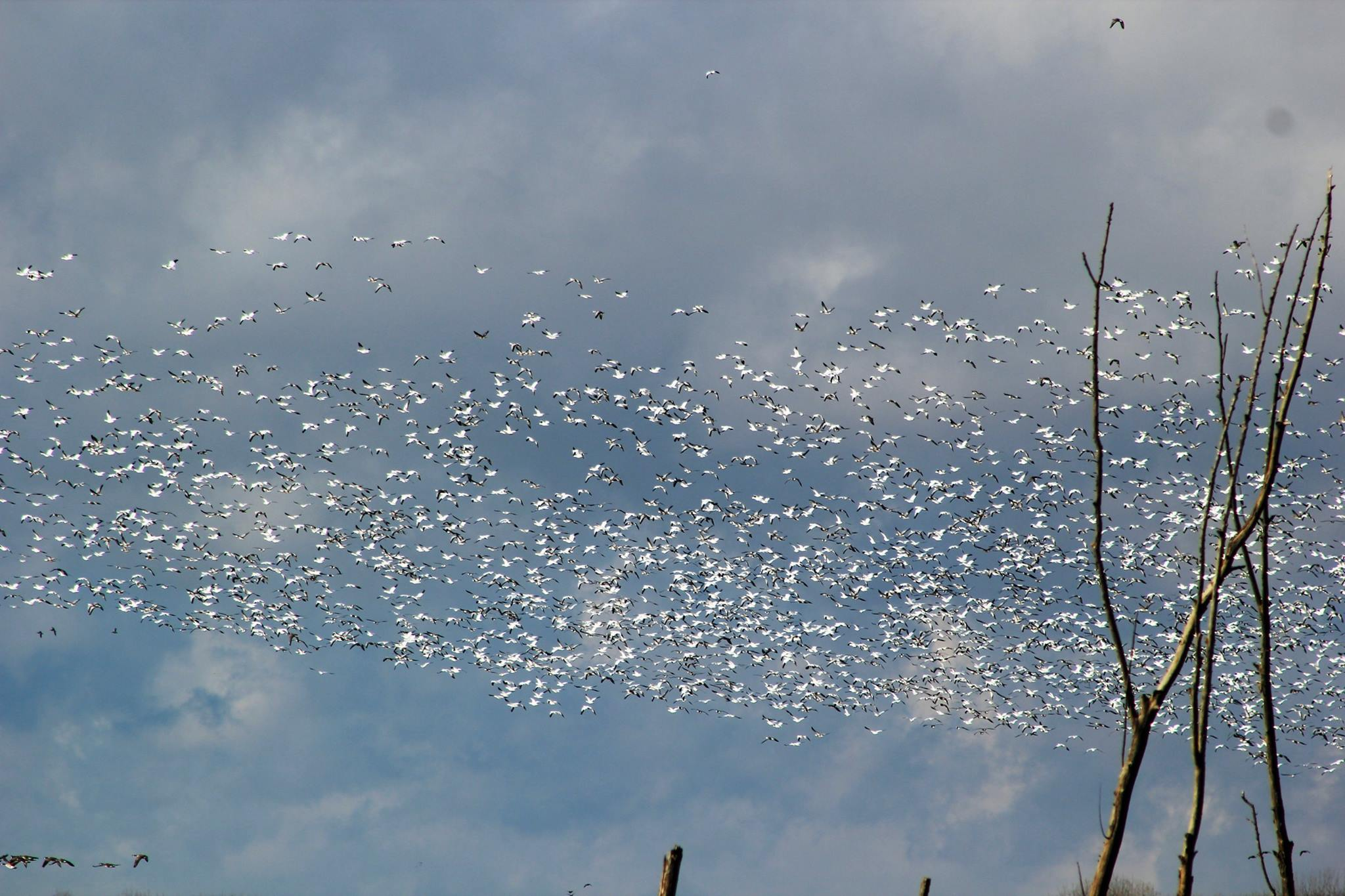
- Snow geese in winter

- Location within the United States
- Location: Mason County, Illinois, United States
- Nearest city: Havana, Illinois
- Coordinates: 40°22′30″N 90°00′00″W
- Area: 4,388 acres (17.76 km^{2})
- Established: 1936
- Governing body: U.S. Fish and Wildlife Service
- Website: www.fws.gov/refuge/chautauqua/

The Chautauqua National Wildlife Refuge is located on the Illinois River in Mason County northeast of Havana, Illinois. It is managed by the U.S. Fish and Wildlife Service as one of the four Illinois River National Wildlife and Fish Refuges.

The refuge consists of 4,388 acres (17.76 km^{2}) of Illinois River bottomland, nearly all of it wetland. The parcel is the former Chautauqua Drainage and Levee District, a failed riverine polder. In the 1920s, workers with steam shovels surrounded the levee district with a large dike in an attempt to create a large new parcel of agricultural farmland. The levee district proved to be financially unable to maintain the dike, however, and the Illinois River reclaimed the polder. The complex alluvial topography that had existed before this intervention was replaced by the broad shallow pool of Chautauqua Lake.

In 1936, the federal government acquired the 4,388-acre (17.76 km^{2}) Chautauqua Drainage and Levee District parcel, including the dikes that enclosed the pool, and began to manage it for wildlife-refuge and flood control purposes. The flood-control aspects of this management have grown more challenging in the years since, as continued agricultural runoff and siltation of the Illinois River has made much of Chautauqua Lake shallower. On some shoreline strips of the lake, the silt has built up to the level of the lake surface, and an alluvial topography of sloughs and floodplain woodlands may be slowly re-establishing itself. However, many of the plant and animal species inhabiting the current Chautauqua Lake and Wildlife Refuge and adjacent Illinois River are nonnative and invasive species such as the Asian carp.

As of 2005, of the 4,388 acres (17.76 km^{2}) of the Chautauqua National Wildlife Refuge, 3,200 acres (13 km^{2}) were classified as an open pool, 800 acres (3.2 km^{2}) were classified as "water and timbered bottomland", and the remaining 388 acres (1.57 km^{2}) were classified as upland forest. The closest numbered highway is U.S. Highway 136 in Mason County.

A nesting pair of bald eagles was observed in the Chautauqua National Wildlife Refuge in the winter of 2005–06.

The Cameron/Billsbach Unit is a detached section of the refuge located further north, in Marshall County, near Henry, Illinois. It covers an additional 1,079 acres (4.37 km^{2}).
