= Mason County Courthouse (Illinois) =

Coordinates: 40°18′02″N 90°03′41″W

The Mason County Courthouse is the courthouse of Mason County, Illinois. Its court sessions hear cases in the 8th circuit of Illinois judicial district 4. The county courthouse is located at 125 North Plum St. in the county seat of Havana. The courthouse is also the seat of Mason County government operations.

== History ==
The current Mason County courthouse, built in 1882–1883, is a functionalist Federal style concrete building faced in buff-colored brick. The current Mason County courthouse is the result of two separate county seat moves, in which the political focus of the county moved from the Illinois River port of Havana to the alternate location of Bath, Illinois, and then back again to Havana. After the status of Havana was finalized in 1851, the taxpayers built a courthouse on the current site. After its destruction by fire, the 1851 site was re-used in 1882–1883 as the footprint of the current courthouse structure.

A major remodeling and expansion project took place in 1960–1961.
