= San Jose, Illinois =

- Village
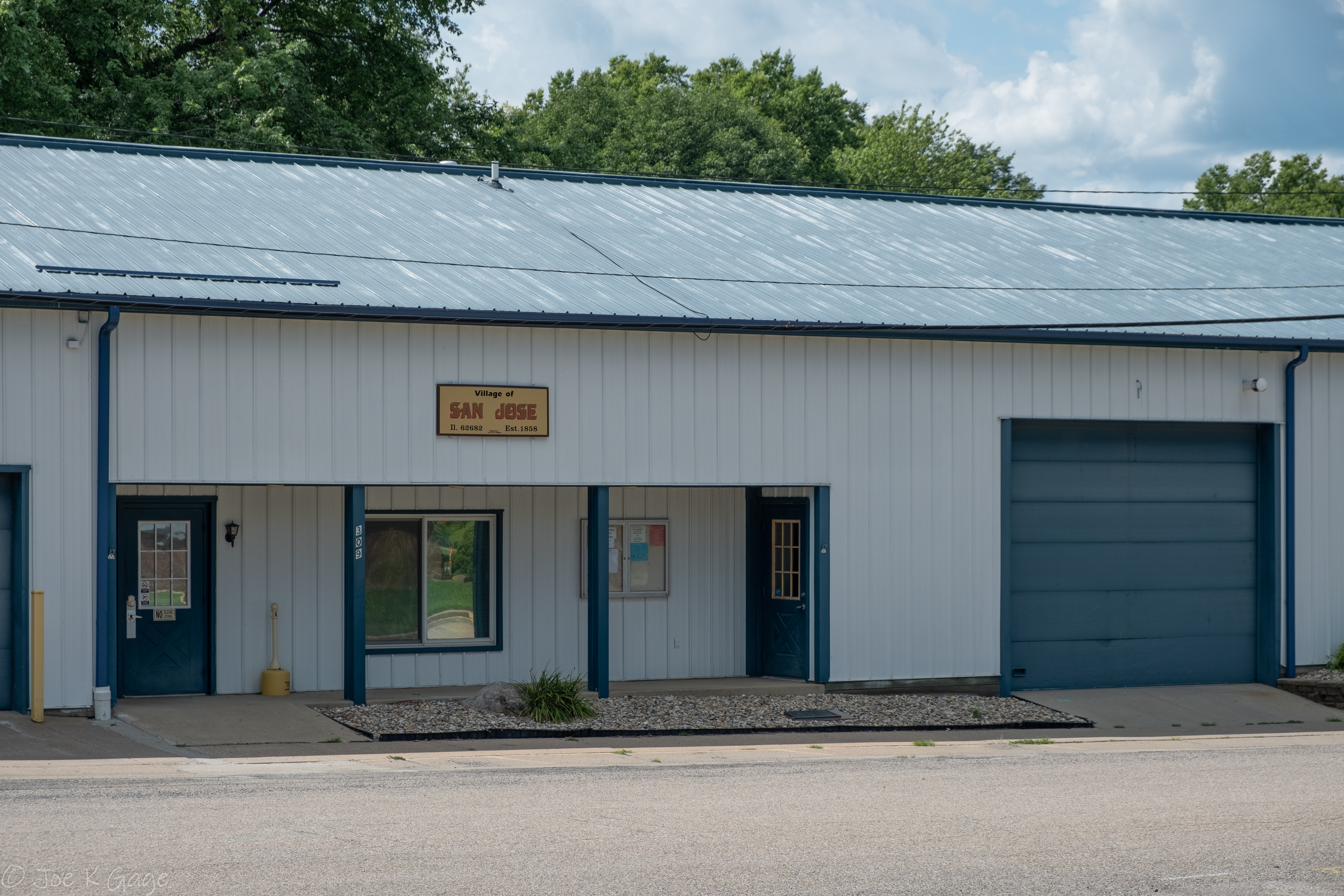
- Village hall

- Location in Mason County, Illinois
- Coordinates: 40°18′19″N 89°36′17″W
- Country: United States
- State: Illinois
- Counties: Mason, Logan
- Townships: Allens Grove, Prairie Creek

Area
  - Total: 0.41 sq mi (1.07 km^{2})
  - Land: 0.41 sq mi (1.07 km^{2})
  - Water: 0 sq mi (0.00 km^{2})
- Elevation: 594 ft (181 m)

Population (2020)
  - Total: 479
  - Density: 1,157.0/sq mi (446.71/km^{2})
- Time zone: UTC-6 (CST)
  - Summer (DST): UTC-5 (CDT)
- ZIP code: 62682
- Area code: 309
- FIPS code: 17-67613
- GNIS feature ID: 2399178
- Website: www.sanjoseil.com

San Jose (/sæn ˈdʒoʊz/ san-JOHZ) is a village in Logan and Mason counties, Illinois, United States, founded in 1858. The population was 479 at the 2020 census, down from 642 in 2010.

== History ==
San Jose was platted in 1858. The village was incorporated in 1876.

== Geography ==
San Jose is located in eastern Mason County and northwestern Logan County. U.S. Route 136 passes through the village as its Main Street, leading west 24 miles (39 km) to Havana, the Mason county seat, and east 23 miles (37 km) to McLean. Lincoln, the Logan County seat, is 21 miles (34 km) to the southeast.

According to the 2021 census gazetteer files, San Jose has a total area of 0.41 square miles (1.06 km^{2}), all land.

== Demographics ==
Historical population
Census	Pop.	Note	%±
1880	285		—
1890	307		7.7%
1900	479		56.0%
1910	446		−6.9%
1920	566		26.9%
1930	486		−14.1%
1940	520		7.0%
1950	562		8.1%
1960	593		5.5%
1970	681		14.8%
1980	784		15.1%
1990	519		−33.8%
2000	696		34.1%
2010	642		−7.8%
2020	479		−25.4%
Decennial US Census

As of the 2020 census there were 479 people, 230 households, and 180 families residing in the village. The population density was 1,157.00 inhabitants per square mile (446.72/km^{2}). There were 237 housing units at an average density of 572.46 per square mile (221.03/km^{2}). The racial makeup of the village was 92.48% White, 0.42% African American, 0.42% Native American, 0.21% Asian, 0.00% Pacific Islander, 0.84% from other races, and 5.64% from two or more races. Hispanic or Latino of any race were 2.09% of the population.

There were 230 households, out of which 20.9% had children under the age of 18 living with them, 69.13% were married couples living together, 4.78% had a female householder with no husband present, and 21.74% were non-families. 16.52% of all households were made up of individuals, and 8.70% had someone living alone who was 65 years of age or older. The average household size was 2.52 and the average family size was 2.30.

The village's age distribution consisted of 17.7% under the age of 18, 3.8% from 18 to 24, 26.7% from 25 to 44, 34% from 45 to 64, and 17.7% who were 65 years of age or older. The median age was 47.7 years. For every 100 females, there were 86.0 males. For every 100 females age 18 and over, there were 90.4 males.

The median income for a household in the village was $57,813, and the median income for a family was $61,563. Males had a median income of $41,875 versus $26,683 for females. The per capita income for the village was $28,118. About 5.0% of families and 7.6% of the population were below the poverty line, including 3.3% of those under age 18 and 4.3% of those age 65 or over.

== Notable people ==
- Ruby K. Worner (1900–1955), chemist and textile expert
