= Helen Heckman =

American dancer

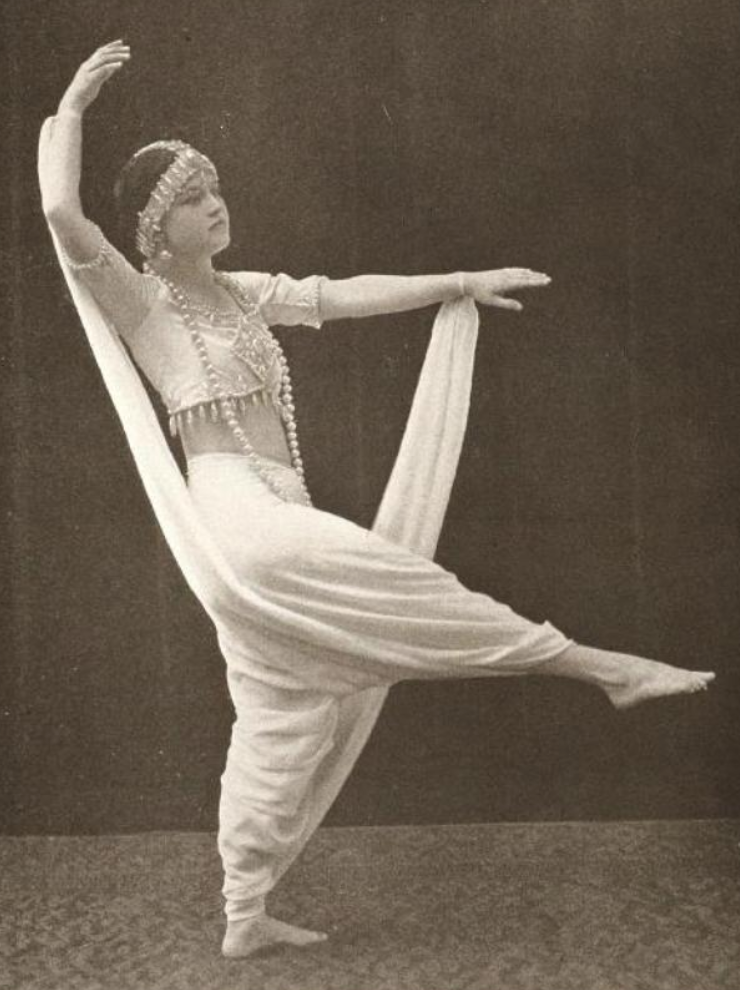
- Helen Heckman, from a 1921 publication. This costume was described in a 1923 article: "The choli and headdress have 800 pearls of all sizes and shapes, while the necklace itself contains 80 larger ones. The costume entire is white..." (from "Good Seats Available for Heckman Recital Tonight", The Ithaca Journal (October 11, 1923): 2.)
- Born: Helen Elizabeth Heckman; December 10, 1898; Manito, Illinois
- Died: April 1975 (aged 76)
- Occupation: Dancer

Helen Elizabeth Heckman (December 10, 1898 – April 17, 1975) was a deaf American dancer from Oklahoma.

== Early life and education ==
Helen Elizabeth Heckman was born in Manito, Illinois, and raised in Muskogee, Oklahoma, with summers on Cayuga Lake in New York. She was the daughter of Philip E. Heckman (1860–1932) and Anna Foster Heckman (1868–1908).

Heckman was deaf after surviving meningitis in infancy, and did not speak but used some gestural language until age 12. Her stepmother, Vina Janet French Heckman (1874–1972), "vetoed the sign language at the outset" and oversaw Heckman's training to speak, sing, play piano, and dance. "I got little encouragement from the institutions, even those here in the East," Mrs. Heckman noted later. "I had to devise for myself." V. Janet Heckman later spoke as an expert on parenting and child development.

== Career ==
Heckman performed as a dancer in the 1920s, often in elaborate costumes, including on a tour of Europe, with her sister Mildred, a violinist. Her stepmother continued to supervise her daily life and associations, into her twenties. In 1928, Heckman wrote a memoir, My Life Transformed, about her education.

Photographs and details of Heckman's life were featured in publications for the general public and for deaf readers. She was often presented as an inspirational example of "overcoming", highlighting her youthful beauty and physical fitness and celebrating her fluent speech. "Ten years ago you would have pitied Helen Heckman," began one newspaper profile in 1922, after she won second prize in a national beauty contest, explaining that "Helen has been metamorphosed by her brilliant step-mother into a charming, cultured girl of keen mentality."

== Personal life ==
Heckman married Vina Janet Heckman's younger brother, Erwin Dingley French (1890–1969) in 1956, as his second wife. She died in 1975, aged 76 years. Her grave is with her husband's, at River Bend Cemetery in Rhode Island.
