= Manito Township, Mason County, Illinois =

Manito Township
- Township

- Location of Illinois in the United States
- Coordinates: 40°23′27″N 89°46′15″W
- Country: United States
- State: Illinois
- County: Mason
- Settled: November 5, 1861

Area
  - Total: 43.77 sq mi (113.4 km^{2})
  - Land: 43.77 sq mi (113.4 km^{2})
  - Water: 0 sq mi (0 km^{2})
- Elevation: 489 ft (149 m)

Population (2010)
  - Estimate (2016): 2,261
  - Density: 56.3/sq mi (21.7/km^{2})
- Time zone: UTC-6 (CST)
  - Summer (DST): UTC-5 (CDT)
- FIPS code: 17-125-46396

Manito Township is located in Mason County, Illinois, United States. As of the 2010 census, its population was 2,466 and it contained 1,088 housing units.

== Geography ==
According to the 2010 census, the township has a total area of 43.77 square miles (113.4 km^{2}), all land.

== Demographics ==
Historical population
Census	Pop.	Note	%±
2016 (est.)	2,261
U.S. Decennial Census
