= Fults Hill Prairie State Natural Area =

State park in Illinois, USA

- IUCN category V (protected landscape/seascape)
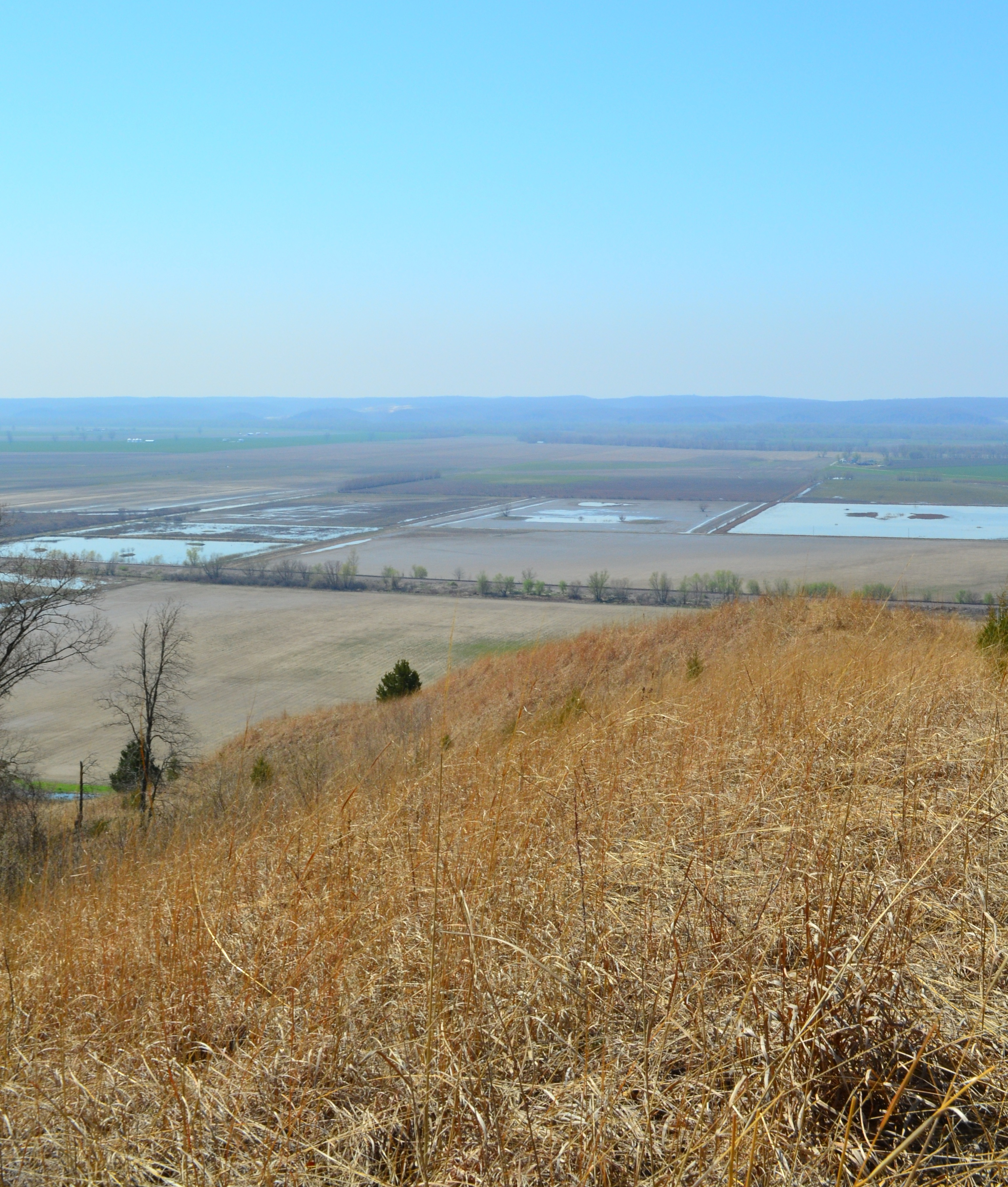

- Location within Illinois Location within the United States
- Location: Monroe County, Illinois, USA
- Nearest city: Waterloo, Illinois
- Coordinates: 37°58′39″N 89°48′02″W
- Area: 997 acres (403 ha)
- Established: 1970
- Governing body: Illinois Department of Natural Resources

U.S. National Natural Landmark
- Designated: 1986

Fults Hill Prairie State Natural Area, also known as the Fults Hill Prairie Nature Preserve, is a state park and nature reserve on 997 acres (403 ha) in Monroe County, Illinois, United States. A key feature of the preserve is a 532-acre (215 ha) hill prairie located on the east bluff of the Mississippi River overlooking the American Bottom near Fults, Illinois. The Fults Hill Prairie has been listed as a National Natural Landmark.

== Natural resources ==
The preserve is dominated by steep Mississippi River limestone bluffs and ravines. On top of the bluff lies a thick coating of windblown loess soil. This parcel of land has grown into a hill prairie of grasses and forbs characteristic of the tallgrass prairie, and varied by snatches of fire-resistant trees such as the bur oak.

The preserve is home to a wide variety of species found in few other locations in Illinois. Some of these include big bluestem grass, plains scorpion, cactus, skinks, and fence lizards.

== History and description ==
The upland or hill prairie was once the dominant ecosystem for much of the land that became the U.S. state of Illinois, the Prairie State. The state's Department of Natural Resources, which owns the prairie parcel, describes it as containing "the largest complex of the highest quality, essentially undisturbed loess hill prairies along the Mississippi River in Illinois". Most of the prairie acreage that makes up this parcel apparently remained un-plowed during the pioneer years of the 1800s.

The nature preserve was dedicated as an Illinois Nature Preserve in 1970, and was listed as a National Natural Landmark in 1986.

The preserve is located approximately 1.6 miles (2.6 km) south of Fults. It is owned and managed by the Illinois Department of Natural Resources.

== See also ==
- Revis Hill Prairie State Natural Area
- Kaskaskia–Cahokia Trail
