= Quiver Creek =

Stream in Mason County, Illinois, U.S.

Coordinates: 40°21′11″N 90°1′24″W

Quiver Creek is a stream in Mason County in the U.S. state of Illinois. It is a tributary of the Illinois River.

Quiver Creek derives its name from cuivre, the French word meaning "copper".

== See also ==
- List of rivers of Illinois
