= Colicroot =

Colicroot is a common name for several plants and may refer to:

- Aletris spp. - main use
- Apocynum androsaemifolium
- Asarum canadense
- Asclepias tuberosa
- Dioscorea villosa, native to eastern North America
- Liatris squarrosa, native to eastern and central North America
