= Sherman Township, Mason County, Illinois =

Sherman Township
- Township

- Location of Illinois in the United States
- Coordinates: 40°15′38″N 89°53′40″W
- Country: United States
- State: Illinois
- County: Mason
- Settled: January 27, 1867

Area
  - Total: 36.02 sq mi (93.3 km^{2})
  - Land: 36.02 sq mi (93.3 km^{2})
  - Water: 0 sq mi (0 km^{2})
- Elevation: 499 ft (152 m)

Population (2010)
  - Estimate (2016): 489
  - Density: 14.6/sq mi (5.6/km^{2})
- Time zone: UTC-6 (CST)
  - Summer (DST): UTC-5 (CDT)
- FIPS code: 17-125-69329

Sherman Township is located in Mason County, Illinois, United States. As of the 2010 census, its population was 526 and it contained 247 housing units.

== Geography ==
According to the 2010 census, the township has a total area of 36.02 square miles (93.3 km^{2}), all land.

== Demographics ==
Historical population
Census	Pop.	Note	%±
2016 (est.)	489
U.S. Decennial Census
