= Crane Creek Township, Mason County, Illinois =

Coordinates: 40°10′09″N 89°52′36″W

Crane Creek Township
- Township
- Location in Mason County
- Country: United States
- State: Illinois
- County: Mason
- Settlement: November 5, 1861

Area
  - Total: 34.2 sq mi (89 km^{2})
  - Land: 34.01 sq mi (88.1 km^{2})
  - Water: 0.19 sq mi (0.49 km^{2}) 0.56%

Population (2010)
  - Estimate (2016): 126
  - Density: 4/sq mi (1.5/km^{2})
- Time zone: UTC-6 (CST)
  - Summer (DST): UTC-5 (CDT)
- FIPS code: 17-125-17250

Crane Creek Township is located in Mason County, Illinois. As of the 2010 census, its population was 136 and it contained 73 housing units.

== Geography ==
According to the 2010 census, the township has a total area of 34.2 square miles (89 km^{2}), of which 34.01 square miles (88.1 km^{2}) (or 99.44%) is land and 0.19 square miles (0.49 km^{2}) (or 0.56%) is water.

== Demographics ==
Historical population
Census	Pop.	Note	%±
2016 (est.)	126
U.S. Decennial Census
