= Mason City Township, Mason County, Illinois =

Mason City Township
- Township

- Location of Illinois in the United States
- Coordinates: 40°11′11″N 89°39′37″W
- Country: United States
- State: Illinois
- County: Mason
- Settled: November 5, 1861

Area
  - Total: 35.51 sq mi (92.0 km^{2})
  - Land: 35.42 sq mi (91.7 km^{2})
  - Water: 0.09 sq mi (0.23 km^{2})
- Elevation: 548 ft (167 m)

Population (2010)
  - Estimate (2016): 2,418
  - Density: 74.3/sq mi (28.7/km^{2})
- Time zone: UTC-6 (CST)
  - Summer (DST): UTC-5 (CDT)
- FIPS code: 17-125-47482

Mason City Township is located in Mason County, Illinois, United States. As of the 2010 census, its population was 2,633 and it contained 1,220 housing units.

== Geography ==
According to the 2010 census, the township has a total area of 35.51 square miles (92.0 km^{2}), of which 35.42 square miles (91.7 km^{2}) (or 99.75%) is land and 0.09 square miles (0.23 km^{2}) (or 0.25%) is water.

== Demographics ==
Historical population
Census	Pop.	Note	%±
2016 (est.)	2,418
U.S. Decennial Census
