= Quiver Township, Mason County, Illinois =

Quiver Township
- Township

- Location of Illinois in the United States
- Coordinates: 40°22′40″N 89°56′14″W
- Country: United States
- State: Illinois
- County: Mason
- Settled: November 5, 1861

Area
  - Total: 52 sq mi (130 km^{2})
  - Land: 42.49 sq mi (110.0 km^{2})
  - Water: 9.51 sq mi (24.6 km^{2})
- Elevation: 495 ft (151 m)

Population (2010)
  - Estimate (2016): 832
  - Density: 21.2/sq mi (8.2/km^{2})
- Time zone: UTC-6 (CST)
  - Summer (DST): UTC-5 (CDT)
- FIPS code: 17-125-62419

Quiver Township is located in Mason County, Illinois, United States. As of the 2010 census, its population was 900 and it contained 517 housing units. It contains the census-designated place of Goofy Ridge.

Quiver Township took its name from Quiver Creek.

== Geography ==
According to the 2010 census, the township has a total area of 52 square miles (130 km^{2}), of which 42.49 square miles (110.0 km^{2}) (or 81.71%) is land and 9.51 square miles (24.6 km^{2}) (or 18.29%) is water.

== Demographics ==
Historical population
Census	Pop.	Note	%±
2016 (est.)	832
U.S. Decennial Census
