= Kilbourne, Illinois =

- Village
- Location in Mason County, Illinois
- Coordinates: 40°09′07″N 90°00′41″W
- Country: United States
- State: Illinois
- County: Mason
- Township: Kilbourne

Area
  - Total: 0.89 sq mi (2.30 km^{2})
  - Land: 0.89 sq mi (2.30 km^{2})
  - Water: 0 sq mi (0.00 km^{2})
- Elevation: 495 ft (151 m)

Population (2020)
  - Total: 265
  - Density: 298.0/sq mi (115.05/km^{2})
- Time zone: UTC-6 (CST)
  - Summer (DST): UTC-5 (CDT)
- ZIP code: 62655
- Area code: 309
- FIPS code: 17-39857
- GNIS ID: 2398343

Kilbourne is a village in Mason County, Illinois, United States. The population was 265 at the 2020 census, down from 302 in 2010.

== Geography ==
Kilbourne is located in southern Mason County. Illinois Route 97 runs through the east side of the village, leading north 11 miles (18 km) to Havana, the county seat, and southeast 14 miles (23 km) to Petersburg.

According to the U.S. Census Bureau, Kilbourne has a total area of 0.89 square miles (2.31 km^{2}), all land.

== Demographics ==
Historical population
| Census | Pop. | Note | %± |
|---|---|---|---|
| 1910 | 424 | | — |
| 1920 | 393 | | −7.3% |
| 1930 | 393 | | 0.0% |
| 1940 | 360 | | −8.4% |
| 1950 | 374 | | 3.9% |
| 1960 | 352 | | −5.9% |
| 1970 | 441 | | 25.3% |
| 1980 | 382 | | −13.4% |
| 1990 | 350 | | −8.4% |
| 2000 | 375 | | 7.1% |
| 2010 | 302 | | −19.5% |
| 2020 | 265 | | −12.3% |
U.S. Decennial Census

At the 2000 census, there were 375 people, 147 households and 103 families residing in the village. The population density was 353.2 inhabitants per square mile (136.4/km^{2}). There were 159 housing units at an average density of 149.7 per square mile (57.8/km^{2}). The racial makeup of the village was 97.07% White, 0.27% African American, 1.87% Native American, 0.27% Asian, and 0.53% from two or more races. Hispanic or Latino of any race were 0.80% of the population.

There were 147 households, of which 36.7% had children under the age of 18 living with them, 55.1% were married couples living together, 6.8% had a female householder with no husband present, and 29.9% were non-families. 26.5% of all households were made up of individuals, and 12.2% had someone living alone who was 65 years of age or older. The average household size was 2.55 and the average family size was 3.13.

29.6% of the population were under the age of 18, 5.3% from 18 to 24, 30.7% from 25 to 44, 20.5% from 45 to 64, and 13.9% who were 65 years of age or older. The median age was 35 years. For every 100 females, there were 104.9 males. For every 100 females age 18 and over, there were 103.1 males.

The median household income was $26,000 and the median family income was $30,875. Males had a median income of $28,125 compared with $22,500 for females. The per capita income for the village was $10,710. About 20.2% of families and 22.1% of the population were below the poverty line, including 25.7% of those under age 18 and 14.7% of those age 65 or over.
