= Allens Grove Township, Mason County, Illinois =

Allens Grove
- Township
- Location in Mason County

- Location of Allens Grove Township in Illinois
- Coordinates: 40°16′15″N 89°39′47″W
- Country: United States
- State: Illinois
- County: Mason
- Settled: November 5, 1861

Area
  - Total: 35.77 sq mi (92.6 km^{2})
  - Land: 35.72 sq mi (92.5 km^{2})
  - Water: 0.04 sq mi (0.10 km^{2})
- Elevation: 574 ft (175 m)

Population (2020)
  - Total: 470
  - Density: 13/sq mi (5.1/km^{2})
- Time zone: UTC-6 (CST)
  - Summer (DST): UTC-5 (CDT)
- FIPS code: 17-125-00844

Allens Grove Township is located in Mason County, Illinois. As of the 2020 census, its population was 470 and it contained 238 housing units.

== Geography ==
According to the 2010 census, the township has a total area of 35.77 square miles (92.6 km^{2}), of which 35.72 square miles (92.5 km^{2}) (or 99.86%) is land and 0.04 square miles (0.10 km^{2}) (or 0.11%) is water.

== Demographics ==
Historical population
Census	Pop.	Note	%±
2010	586		—
2016 (est.)	545		−7.0%
U.S. Decennial Census

[[Census data by ACS 2024]]

The town inhabits 395 people, 55% of whom are aged 18 to 64 years**, 29% of whom are aged under 18 years** and the remaining 15% are aged 65 and over** . For sex, female accounts for 59% and male accounts for the remaining 41%**.

=== Ethnicity ===
White - 83%**

Two+ - 10%**

Hispanic* - 7%**

*Hispanic includes respondents of any race. Other categories are non-Hispanic.

**Margin of error is at least 10 percent of the total value.
