= Forest City Township, Mason County, Illinois =

Coordinates: 40°20′23″N 89°49′09″W

Forest City Township
- Township
- Location in Mason County
- Country: United States
- State: Illinois
- County: Mason
- Settlement: November 5, 1861

Area
  - Total: 33.31 sq mi (86.3 km^{2})
  - Land: 33.31 sq mi (86.3 km^{2})
  - Water: 0 sq mi (0 km^{2}) 0%

Population (2010)
  - Estimate (2016): 485
  - Density: 15.7/sq mi (6.1/km^{2})
- Time zone: UTC-6 (CST)
  - Summer (DST): UTC-5 (CDT)
- FIPS code: 17-125-26766

Forest City Township is located in Mason County, Illinois. As of the 2010 census, its population was 522 and it contained 228 housing units.

== Geography ==
According to the 2010 census, the township has a total area of 33.31 square miles (86.3 km^{2}), all land.

== Demographics ==
Historical population
| Census | Pop. | Note | %± |
|---|---|---|---|
| 2016 (est.) | 485 |
U.S. Decennial Census
