= Bath Township, Mason County, Illinois =

Coordinates: 40°09′21″N 90°06′52″W

Bath Township
- Township
- Location in Mason County
- Country: United States
- State: Illinois
- County: Mason
- Settlement: November 5, 1861

Area
  - Total: 71.85 sq mi (186.1 km^{2})
  - Land: 66.78 sq mi (173.0 km^{2})
  - Water: 5.08 sq mi (13.2 km^{2}) 7.07%

Population (2010)
  - Estimate (2016): 796
  - Density: 13/sq mi (5.0/km^{2})
- Time zone: UTC-6 (CST)
  - Summer (DST): UTC-5 (CDT)
- FIPS code: 17-125-04169

Bath Township is located in Mason County, Illinois. As of the 2010 census, its population was 866 and it contained 475 housing units.

== Geography ==
According to the 2010 census, the township has a total area of 71.85 square miles (186.1 km^{2}), of which 66.78 square miles (173.0 km^{2}) (or 92.94%) is land and 5.08 square miles (13.2 km^{2}) (or 7.07%) is water.

== Demographics ==
Historical population
Census	Pop.	Note	%±
2016 (est.)	796
U.S. Decennial Census
