= Havana Township, Mason County, Illinois =

Havana Township
- Township

- Location of Illinois in the United States
- Coordinates: 40°16′24″N 90°00′39″W
- Country: United States
- State: Illinois
- County: Mason
- Settled: November 5, 1861
- Elevation: 495 ft (151 m)

Population (2010)
  - Estimate (2016): 4,427
  - Density: 83.2/sq mi (32.1/km^{2})
- Time zone: UTC-6 (CST)
  - Summer (DST): UTC-5 (CDT)
- FIPS code: 17-125-33526

Havana Township is located in Mason County, Illinois, United States. As of the 2010 census, its population was 4,816 and it contained 2,295 housing units.

== History ==
Havana Township was named after Havana, the capital of Cuba.

== Geography ==
According to the 2010 census, the township has a total area of 59.06 square miles (153.0 km^{2}), of which 57.86 square miles (149.9 km^{2}) (or 97.97%) is land and 1.2 square miles (3.1 km^{2}) (or 2.03%) is water.

== Demographics ==
Historical population
Census	Pop.	Note	%±
2016 (est.)	4,427
U.S. Decennial Census

=== Race ===
Havana township is home to a predominantly white population, with the remaining residents either being of Hispanic origin, having two or more races, or being Native Americans.

=== Gender ===
Havana township contains a fairly even gender split, with 52% of the population being registered as male.

=== Age ===
The average age of residents in Havana Township is 43.8. 56% of residents are between 18 and 64 years of age, with the groups of 65+ and 18 or less being fairly even (23% and 21% respectively).
