= Havana, Illinois =

- City
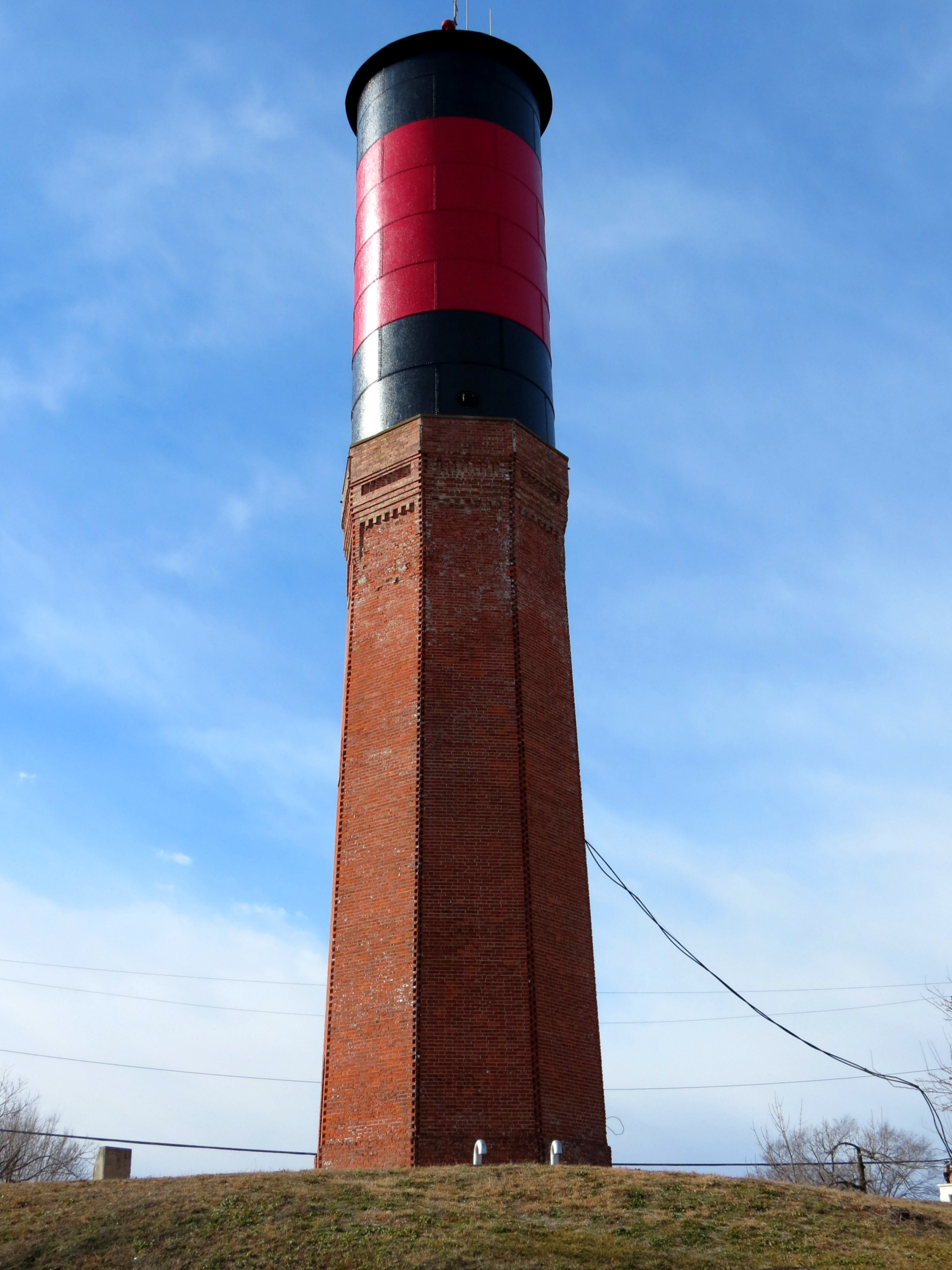
- Havana Water Tower
- Interactive map of Havana, Illinois
- Location within Illinois Location within the United States
- Coordinates: 40°17′42″N 90°03′24″W
- Country: United States
- State: Illinois
- County: Mason
- Township: Havana
- Incorporated: 1853
- Named for: Havana

Government
  - Mayor: Denis Bryant

Area
  - Total: 2.94 sq mi (7.62 km^{2})
  - Land: 2.78 sq mi (7.19 km^{2})
  - Water: 0.17 sq mi (0.43 km^{2})
- Elevation: 469 ft (143 m)

Population (2020)
  - Total: 2,963
  - Estimate (2024): 2,826
- Time zone: UTC-6 (CST)
  - Summer (DST): UTC-5 (CDT)
- ZIP code: 62644
- Area code: 309
- FIPS code: 17-33513
- GNIS ID: 2394323
- Website: www.havanail.gov

Havana is a city and the county seat of Mason County, Illinois, United States. The population was 2,963 at the 2020 census, a decline from the figure of 3,301 tabulated in 2010.

== History ==
Havana was a major ancient American settlement two thousand years ago, when the largest verified mound of the Western Hopewell Culture, Rockwell Mound, was built. Local landmarks were mentioned in the journals of French explorers in the late 1600s. A religious medal dating from the early 1700s suggests that there was missionary activity in what is now Havana. When permanent English-speaking residents arrived in 1822, there was a Potawatomi village on the site. A ferry was established to the western bank of the Illinois River to a road that followed the Spoon River. There were War of 1812 bounty lands in western Illinois.

Abraham Lincoln was a frequent visitor to Havana between his days as a soldier in the Black Hawk Wars until at least his three-hour speech on the Rockwell Mound while he was running for the US Senate in 1858. Stephen Douglas had spoken there the day before. When he was younger, Lincoln rode a mail route from New Salem to Havana. Later, he was a local surveyor, and then an itinerant attorney. Mason County was the only place where Lincoln owned farmland. The Havana Public Library, a Carnegie library on the National Register of Historic Places, was built in the town in 1902. The Mason County Courthouse was constructed in Havana in 1883. The English-speaking settlement was originally called "Ross's Ferry" and was later named after Havana, the capital of Cuba. The name was reportedly chosen due to the shape of an island at the mouth of the Spoon River resembling the shape of the island of Cuba. Havana was notorious as a gambling river town, and it is reported that names such as Al Capone would hunt, fish, and gamble in the local clubs.

== Geography ==
Havana is located in western Mason County on the Illinois River. U.S. Route 136 passes through the city as Dearborn Street, South Promenade Street, and East Laurel Street, leading east 24 miles (39 km) to San Jose and west 40 miles (64 km) to Macomb. US 136 crosses the Illinois River on the Scott Wike Lucas Bridge. Illinois Routes 78 and 97 join US 136 passing through Havana and crossing the Illinois River. IL 78 leads south-southwest (downriver) 9 miles (14 km) to Bath and north 21 miles (34 km) to Canton, while IL 97 leads south-southeast 11 miles (18 km) to Kilbourne and northwest 11 miles (18 km) to Lewistown. Chautauqua National Wildlife Refuge is 8 miles (13 km) northeast of Havana, and Sand Ridge State Forest in 9 miles (14km) to the northeast, both along the Illinois River. The Emiquon National Wildlife Refuge is directly across the river from the town. The Havana Regional Airport is roughly 5 miles (8 km) southeast of Havana.

According to the U.S. Census Bureau, Havana has a total area of 2.94 square miles (7.61 km^{2}), of which 2.78 square miles (7.20 km^{2}) are land and 0.17 square miles (0.44 km^{2}), or 5.61%, are water.

=== Climate ===
Climate data for Havana, Illinois (1991–2020)
Month	Jan	Feb	Mar	Apr	May	Jun	Jul	Aug	Sep	Oct	Nov	Dec	Year
Mean daily maximum °F (°C)	33.5 (0.8)	38.8 (3.8)	51.2 (10.7)	63.8 (17.7)	74.5 (23.6)	84.6 (29.2)	88.1 (31.2)	86.0 (30.0)	80.4 (26.9)	67.8 (19.9)	52.4 (11.3)	39.1 (3.9)	63.4 (17.4)
Daily mean °F (°C)	25.0 (−3.9)	29.6 (−1.3)	40.7 (4.8)	52.4 (11.3)	63.7 (17.6)	73.1 (22.8)	76.6 (24.8)	74.4 (23.6)	66.9 (19.4)	54.9 (12.7)	42.1 (5.6)	30.5 (−0.8)	52.5 (11.4)
Mean daily minimum °F (°C)	16.4 (−8.7)	20.4 (−6.4)	30.2 (−1.0)	40.9 (4.9)	52.8 (11.6)	61.6 (16.4)	65.1 (18.4)	62.9 (17.2)	53.5 (11.9)	42.0 (5.6)	31.8 (−0.1)	21.8 (−5.7)	41.6 (5.3)
Average precipitation inches (mm)	2.20 (56)	2.18 (55)	2.72 (69)	4.22 (107)	5.08 (129)	4.73 (120)	4.18 (106)	4.02 (102)	3.26 (83)	3.37 (86)	2.73 (69)	2.35 (60)	41.04 (1,042)
Average snowfall inches (cm)	9.7 (25)	5.8 (15)	3.2 (8.1)	1.2 (3.0)	0.0 (0.0)	0.0 (0.0)	0.0 (0.0)	0.0 (0.0)	0.0 (0.0)	0.0 (0.0)	1.1 (2.8)	6.9 (18)	27.9 (71.9)
Source: NOAA

== Demographics ==
Historical population
Census	Pop.	Note	%±
1850	462		—
1870	1,785		—
1880	2,118		18.7%
1890	2,525		19.2%
1900	3,268		29.4%
1910	3,525		7.9%
1920	3,614		2.5%
1930	3,451		−4.5%
1940	3,999		15.9%
1950	4,379		9.5%
1960	4,363		−0.4%
1970	4,376		0.3%
1980	4,277		−2.3%
1990	3,610		−15.6%
2000	3,577		−0.9%
2010	3,301		−7.7%
2020	2,963		−10.2%
U.S. Decennial Census

=== 2020 census ===
As of the 2020 census, Havana had a population of 2,963. The median age was 45.2 years. 20.7% of residents were under the age of 18 and 23.6% of residents were 65 years of age or older. For every 100 females there were 91.8 males, and for every 100 females age 18 and over there were 89.7 males age 18 and over.

0.0% of residents lived in urban areas, while 100.0% lived in rural areas.

There were 1,317 households in Havana, of which 24.8% had children under the age of 18 living in them. Of all households, 37.6% were married-couple households, 20.2% were households with a male householder and no spouse or partner present, and 32.2% were households with a female householder and no spouse or partner present. About 37.2% of all households were made up of individuals and 18.9% had someone living alone who was 65 years of age or older.

There were 1,513 housing units, of which 13.0% were vacant. The homeowner vacancy rate was 2.2% and the rental vacancy rate was 11.9%.

Racial composition as of the 2020 census
Race	Number	Percent
White	2,749	92.8%
Black or African American	23	0.8%
American Indian and Alaska Native	7	0.2%
Asian	7	0.2%
Native Hawaiian and Other Pacific Islander	0	0.0%
Some other race	7	0.2%
Two or more races	170	5.7%
Hispanic or Latino (of any race)	47	1.6%

=== 2000 census ===
As of the census of 2000, there were 3,577 people, 1,467 households, and 981 families residing in the city. The population density was 1,361.0 inhabitants per square mile (525.5/km^{2}). There were 1,587 housing units at an average density of 603.8 per square mile (233.1/km^{2}). The racial makeup of the city was 98.49% White, 0.14% African American, 0.14% Native American, 0.53% Asian, 0.06% from other races, and 0.64% from two or more races. Hispanic or Latino of any race were 0.59% of the population.

There were 1,467 households, out of which 28.9% had children under the age of 18 living with them, 49.8% were married couples living together, 12.5% had a female householder with no husband present, and 33.1% were non-families. 29.6% of all households were made up of individuals, and 17.2% had someone living alone who was 65 years of age or older. The average household size was 2.35 and the average family size was 2.88.

In the city, the population was spread out, with 23.7% under the age of 18, 8.3% from 18 to 24, 25.7% from 25 to 44, 20.1% from 45 to 64, and 22.3% who were 65 years of age or older. The median age was 40 years. For every 100 females, there were 87.5 males. For every 100 females age 18 and over, there were 83.7 males.

The median income for a household in the city was $30,316, and the median income for a family was $35,684. Males had a median income of $30,833 versus $21,215 for females. The per capita income for the city was $16,781. About 10.2% of families and 12.0% of the population were below the poverty line, including 18.9% of those under age 18 and 7.5% of those age 65 or over.

== Notable people ==
- Fred Beck, MLB player for the various teams
- Roy Hamey, MLB general manager for two teams
- Scott W. Lucas, U.S. senator from Illinois
- Charles Wilson Pierce, former U.S. Congressman for the 4th District of Alabama and State Senator in Nebraska
- Paul Samuell, Illinois Supreme Court justice
