= Mason County, Illinois =

County in Illinois, United States

- County
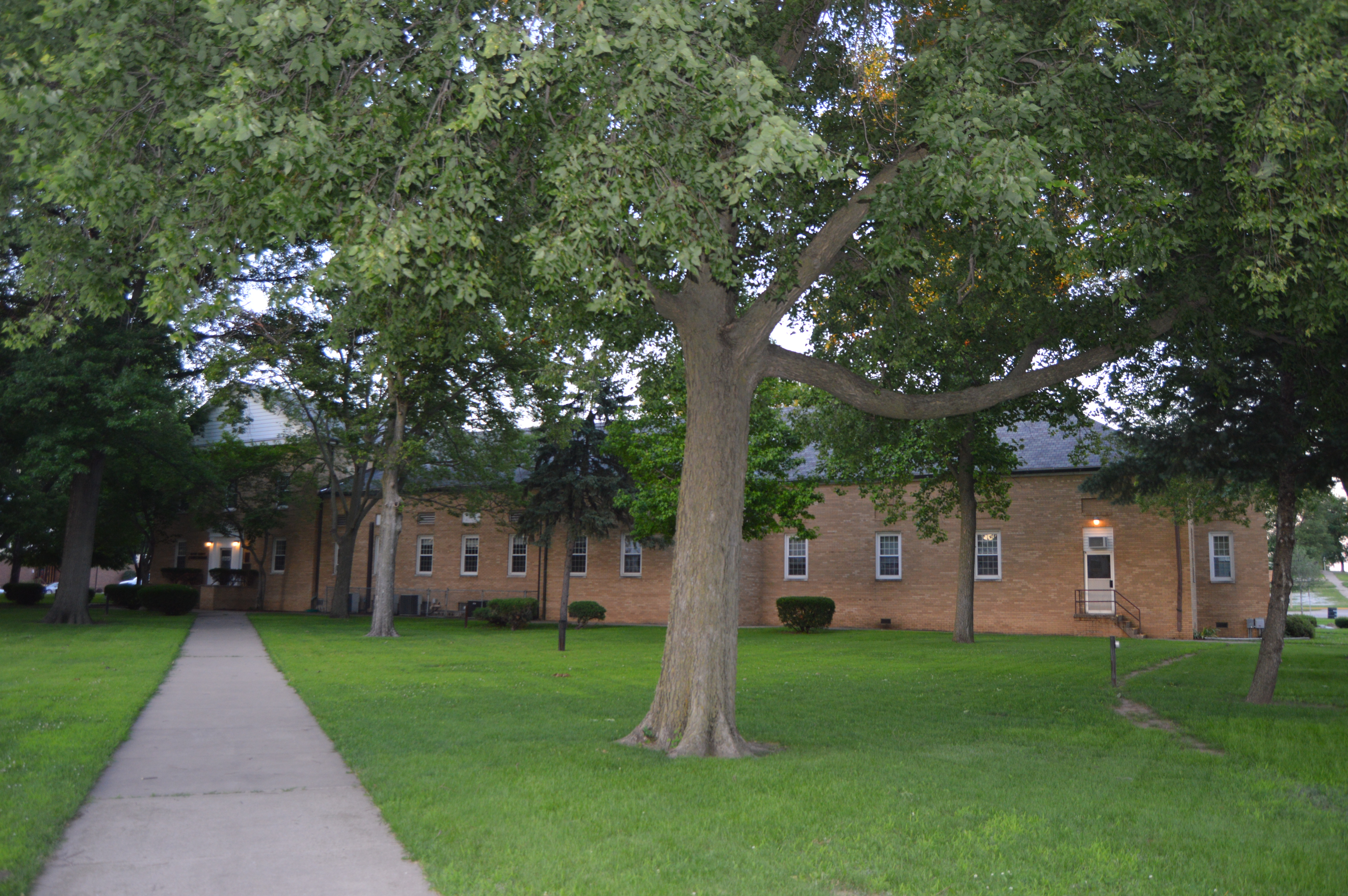
- Mason County Courthouse, Havana

- Location within the U.S. state of Illinois
- Coordinates: 40°14′N 89°55′W
- Country: United States
- State: Illinois
- Founded: 1841
- Named for: George Mason
- Seat: Havana
- Largest city: Havana

Area
  - Total: 563 sq mi (1,460 km^{2})
  - Land: 539 sq mi (1,400 km^{2})
  - Water: 24 sq mi (62 km^{2}) 4.3%

Population (2020)
  - Total: 13,086
  - Estimate (2025): 12,411 ▼
  - Density: 24.3/sq mi (9.37/km^{2})
- Time zone: UTC−6 (Central)
  - Summer (DST): UTC−5 (CDT)
- Congressional district: 15th
- Website: www.masoncountyil.gov

Mason County is a county in the U.S. state of Illinois. According to the 2020 census, it had a population of 13,086. Its county seat is Havana. The county is named in honor of George Mason, a member of the Virginia legislature who campaigned for the adoption of the United States Bill of Rights.

== History ==
Mason County was created in 1841 out of portions of Tazewell and Menard counties.

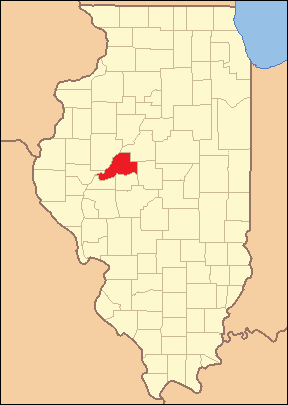
Mason County at the time of its creation in 1841

== Geography ==
According to the U.S. Census Bureau, the county has an area of 563 square miles (1,460 km^{2}), of which 539 square miles (1,400 km^{2}) is land and 24 square miles (62 km^{2}) (4.3%) is water.

Mason County is bound on the south by the Sangamon River, and on the west by the Illinois River. These rivers join at the county's southwest tip.

The soil covering much of Mason County is very sandy. This was formed during the melting of the Wisconsin Glacier about 10,000 years ago. Meltwater from the glacier deposited large amounts of sand in a delta region near at the junction of the Sangamon and Illinois Rivers.

The sandy soil does not hold water well, quickly exposing crops to drought conditions as the water table drops during periods of low precipitation. However, the soil is very good for growing vegetables that are otherwise not common in Illinois. Modern irrigation has made this a highly productive agricultural area.

A sand wetland on the Illinois River is managed by the U.S. Fish and Wildlife Service as the Chautauqua National Wildlife Refuge.

=== National protected area ===
- Chautauqua National Wildlife Refuge (part)

=== State Forest ===
- Sand Ridge State Forest - Containing 7,200 acres (2,900 ha), it is the largest state forest in Illinois.

=== State Fish & Wildlife Areas ===
- Sanganois State Fish & Wildlife Area (part)

=== Climate and weather ===
Havana, Illinois

Climate chart (precipitation, max. and min. temperature)
J	F	M	A	M	J	J	A	S	O	N	D
1.9 32 14	1.9 38 19	3 50 30	3.5 63 40	4.4 74 51	3.8 84 60	3.9 88 64	3.5 86 61	3.2 80 52	2.9 68 41	3.3 51 30	2.6 37 19
- █ Average max. and min. temperatures in °F
- █ Precipitation totals in inches
- Source: The Weather Channel
Metric conversion
J	F	M	A	M	J	J	A	S	O	N	D
47 0 −10	49 3 −7	77 10 −1	88 17 4	113 23 11	97 29 16	98 31 18	88 30 16	82 27 11	73 20 5	83 11 −1	67 3 −7
- █ Average max. and min. temperatures in °C
- █ Precipitation totals in mm

In recent years, average temperatures in the county seat of Havana have ranged from a low of 14 °F (−10 °C) in January to a high of 88 °F (31 °C) in July, although a record low of −30 °F (−34 °C) was recorded in January 1999 and a record high of 106 °F (41 °C) was recorded in July 1983. Average monthly precipitation ranged from 1.85 inches (47 mm) in January to 4.43 inches (113 mm) in May.

=== Adjacent counties ===
- Fulton County - northwest
- Tazewell County - northeast
- Logan County - southeast
- Menard County - south
- Cass County - southwest
- Schuyler County - west

== Transportation ==
=== Public Transportation ===
- SHOW Bus

=== Major highways ===
- U.S. Highway 136
- Illinois Route 10
- Illinois Route 29
- Illinois Route 78
- Illinois Route 97
- Illinois Route 100

== Demographics ==
Historical population
Census	Pop.	Note	%±
1850	5,921		—
1860	10,931		84.6%
1870	16,184		48.1%
1880	16,242		0.4%
1890	16,067		−1.1%
1900	17,491		8.9%
1910	17,377		−0.7%
1920	16,634		−4.3%
1930	15,115		−9.1%
1940	15,358		1.6%
1950	15,326		−0.2%
1960	15,193		−0.9%
1970	16,161		6.4%
1980	19,492		20.6%
1990	16,269		−16.5%
2000	16,038		−1.4%
2010	14,666		−8.6%
2020	13,086		−10.8%
2025 (est.)	12,411	▼	−5.2%
U.S. Decennial Census; 1790-1960 1900-1990; 1990-2000 2010-2013

=== 2020 census ===
As of the 2020 census, the county had a population of 13,086. The median age was 46.1 years. 20.3% of residents were under the age of 18 and 23.5% of residents were 65 years of age or older. For every 100 females there were 98.0 males, and for every 100 females age 18 and over there were 97.4 males age 18 and over.

The racial makeup of the county was 94.9% White, 0.4% Black or African American, 0.2% American Indian and Alaska Native, 0.2% Asian, <0.1% Native Hawaiian and Pacific Islander, 0.3% from some other race, and 3.9% from two or more races. Hispanic or Latino residents of any race comprised 1.4% of the population.

<0.1% of residents lived in urban areas, while 100.0% lived in rural areas.

There were 5,657 households in the county, of which 25.2% had children under the age of 18 living in them. Of all households, 46.9% were married-couple households, 19.6% were households with a male householder and no spouse or partner present, and 24.9% were households with a female householder and no spouse or partner present. About 31.8% of all households were made up of individuals and 15.7% had someone living alone who was 65 years of age or older.

There were 6,626 housing units, of which 14.6% were vacant. Among occupied housing units, 76.7% were owner-occupied and 23.3% were renter-occupied. The homeowner vacancy rate was 3.2% and the rental vacancy rate was 11.7%.

=== Racial and ethnic composition ===
Mason County, Illinois – Racial and ethnic composition Note: the US Census treats Hispanic/Latino as an ethnic category. This table excludes Latinos from the racial categories and assigns them to a separate category. Hispanics/Latinos may be of any race.
Race / Ethnicity (NH = Non-Hispanic)	Pop 1980	Pop 1990	Pop 2000	Pop 2010	Pop 2020	% 1980	% 1990	% 2000	% 2010	% 2020
White alone (NH)	19,327	16,137	15,799	14,296	12,339	99.15%	99.19%	98.51%	97.48%	94.29%
Black or African American alone (NH)	1	8	19	53	49	0.01%	0.05%	0.12%	0.36%	0.37%
Native American or Alaska Native alone (NH)	19	26	32	31	24	0.10%	0.16%	0.20%	0.21%	0.18%
Asian alone (NH)	38	38	32	40	26	0.19%	0.23%	0.20%	0.27%	0.20%
Native Hawaiian or Pacific Islander alone (NH)	x	x	0	0	1	x	x	0.00%	0.00%	0.01%
Other race alone (NH)	16	2	3	3	11	0.08%	0.01%	0.02%	0.02%	0.08%
Mixed race or Multiracial (NH)	x	x	73	126	452	x	x	0.46%	0.86%	3.45%
Hispanic or Latino (any race)	91	58	80	117	184	0.47%	0.36%	0.50%	0.80%	1.41%
Total	19,492	16,269	16,038	14,666	13,086	100.00%	100.00%	100.00%	100.00%	100.00%

=== 2010 census ===
As of the 2010 United States census, there were 14,666 people, 6,079 households, and 4,060 families living in the county. The population density was 27.2 inhabitants per square mile (10.5/km^{2}). There were 7,077 housing units at an average density of 13.1 per square mile (5.1/km^{2}). The racial makeup of the county was 98.1% white, 0.4% black or African American, 0.3% Asian, 0.2% American Indian, 0.1% from other races, and 0.9% from two or more races. Those of Hispanic or Latino origin made up 0.8% of the population. In terms of ancestry, 33.8% were German, 15.6% were American, 11.1% were English, and 10.3% were Irish.

Of the 6,079 households, 28.9% had children under the age of 18 living with them, 52.1% were married couples living together, 10.3% had a female householder with no husband present, 33.2% were non-families, and 28.4% of all households were made up of individuals. The average household size was 2.38 and the average family size was 2.87. The median age was 44.0 years.

The median income for a household in the county was $42,461 and the median income for a family was $51,348. Males had a median income of $43,448 versus $31,087 for females. The per capita income for the county was $23,427. About 13.8% of families and 15.2% of the population were below the poverty line, including 23.6% of those under age 18 and 7.5% of those age 65 or over.

Mason County was identified as a “sundown” county which “has remained all white for many decades, despite its location between Springfield and Peoria...”.

== Communities ==
=== Cities ===
- Havana (seat)
- Mason City

=== Villages ===
- Bath
- Easton
- Forest City
- Kilbourne
- Manito
- San Jose
- Topeka

=== Census-designated place ===
- Goofy Ridge

=== Other unincorporated communities ===
- Bishop
- Lakewood
- Matanzas Beach

=== Townships ===
- Allens Grove
- Bath
- Crane Creek
- Forest City
- Havana
- Kilbourne
- Lynchburg
- Manito
- Mason City
- Pennsylvania
- Quiver
- Salt Creek
- Sherman

== Politics ==
Although it voted for the Whig Party in the three elections from 1840 to 1848, Mason County was to be solidly Democratic for the next sixty to seventy years due to its anti-Yankee German-American heritage. It was not until the 1920 election when bitter resentment was felt by German-Americans at Woodrow Wilson’s postwar policies that Mason supported a GOP candidate.

In the following eighty years, Mason was a Republican-leaning swing county, although isolationist sentiment did cause it to vote narrowly for Wendell Willkie in 1940 and more convincingly for Thomas E. Dewey in 1944.

United States presidential election results for Mason County, Illinois
Year	Republican		Democratic		Third party(ies)	
Year	No.	%	No.	%	No.	%
1892	1,614	40.01%	2,211	54.81%	209	5.18%
1896	2,100	45.83%	2,407	52.53%	75	1.64%
1900	2,027	43.72%	2,508	54.10%	101	2.18%
1904	1,798	45.04%	1,806	45.24%	388	9.72%
1908	1,924	43.49%	2,264	51.18%	236	5.33%
1912	948	23.00%	2,173	52.73%	1,000	24.27%
1916	3,029	42.43%	3,886	54.43%	224	3.14%
1920	3,842	58.40%	2,595	39.44%	142	2.16%
1924	3,522	52.72%	2,536	37.96%	622	9.31%
1928	3,956	54.78%	3,246	44.95%	19	0.26%
1932	2,551	30.73%	5,681	68.45%	68	0.82%
1936	3,395	38.88%	5,278	60.45%	58	0.66%
1940	4,541	50.47%	4,416	49.08%	41	0.46%
1944	3,959	54.52%	3,282	45.19%	21	0.29%
1948	3,525	49.83%	3,503	49.52%	46	0.65%
1952	4,982	61.91%	3,061	38.04%	4	0.05%
1956	4,677	59.29%	3,199	40.55%	13	0.16%
1960	4,337	53.02%	3,824	46.75%	19	0.23%
1964	2,833	36.84%	4,857	63.16%	0	0.00%
1968	3,899	49.65%	3,365	42.85%	589	7.50%
1972	4,897	62.70%	2,901	37.14%	12	0.15%
1976	3,847	49.01%	3,947	50.29%	55	0.70%
1980	4,644	60.37%	2,680	34.84%	369	4.80%
1984	4,109	54.89%	3,354	44.80%	23	0.31%
1988	3,424	49.95%	3,406	49.69%	25	0.36%
1992	2,473	32.11%	3,969	51.53%	1,260	16.36%
1996	2,430	37.71%	3,385	52.53%	629	9.76%
2000	3,411	50.37%	3,192	47.14%	169	2.50%
2004	3,907	54.39%	3,215	44.76%	61	0.85%
2008	3,141	45.98%	3,542	51.85%	148	2.17%
2012	3,265	51.86%	2,867	45.54%	164	2.60%
2016	4,058	62.50%	2,014	31.02%	421	6.48%
2020	4,654	68.59%	1,985	29.26%	146	2.15%
2024	4,464	69.73%	1,773	27.69%	165	2.58%

== Education ==
K-12 school districts include:

- Havana Community Unit School District 126
- Illini Central Community Unit School District 189
- Midwest Central Community Unit School District 191

It also includes portions of an elementary school district, New Holland-Middletown Elementary School District 88, and a secondary school district, Lincoln Community High School District 404.

== See also ==
- National Register of Historic Places listings in Mason County, Illinois
