= List of tornadoes in the outbreak sequence of April 23–28, 2026 =

From April 23 to 28, 2026, an extended period of tornadic activity took place across the Central United States, spawning 108 tornadoes.

Daily statistics
Date	Total	EFU	EF0	EF1	EF2	EF3	EF4	EF5	Deaths	Injuries
April 23	21	5	10	4	1	0	1	0	0	1
April 24	5	0	2	3	0	0	0	0	0	0
April 25	24	4	7	11	1	0	0	0	1	6
April 26	12	4	3	4	1	0	0	0	0	1
April 27	22	1	6	14	1	0	0	0	0	0
April 28	25	3	12	7	2	1	0	0	0	5
Total	108	17	40	44	6	1	1	0	1	11

== Confirmed tornadoes ==
Confirmed tornadoes by Enhanced Fujita rating
EFU	EF0	EF1	EF2	EF3	EF4	EF5	Total
26	41	44	6	1	1	0	119

=== April 23 event ===
List of confirmed tornadoes – Thursday, April 23, 2026 (Note: All dates are based on the local time zone where the tornado touched down; however, all times are in Coordinated Universal Time for consistency.)
EF#	Location	County / Parish	State	Start Coord.	Time (UTC)	Path length	Max width
EF1	N of Little Sioux to WNW of Pisgah	Harrison	IA	41.8305°N 96.034°W	18:46–18:54	2.84 mi (4.57 km)	500 yd (460 m)
EF1	A tornado began in the Missouri River bottoms, flipping a center irrigation pivot. As it moved northeast, it inflicted damage to outbuildings, trees and power poles before flipping another irrigation pivot. The tornado then tore the roof off of a hoop barn before lifting.						
EFU	N of Fiscus	Audubon	IA	41.7829°N 95.0863°W	21:52	0.07 mi (0.11 km)	10 yd (9.1 m)
EFU	A tornado was recorded. No damage occurred.						
EF0	SE of Riverton (1st tornado)	Fremont	IA	40.6338°N 95.5033°W	22:34–22:37	1.76 mi (2.83 km)	80 yd (73 m)
EF0	This weak tornado caused minor damage to trees as it moved mostly over open fields.						
EFU	SE of Riverton (2nd tornado)	Fremont	IA	40.6352°N 95.4875°W	22:34–22:36	0.52 mi (0.84 km)	20 yd (18 m)
EFU	A tornado was recorded and photographed. No damage was noted.						
EF0	NW of Alma	Wabaunsee	KS	39.0518°N 96.382°W	23:03–23:09	3.5 mi (5.6 km)	30 yd (27 m)
EF0	This weak tornado caused intermittent damage.						
EFU	SE of Volland	Wabaunsee	KS	38.8763°N 96.2858°W	23:04–23:05	0.5 mi (0.80 km)	30 yd (27 m)
EFU	A TDS was noted on radar however no damage was found.						
EF0	E of Coin to NNW of College Springs	Page	IA	40.6509°N 95.172°W	23:17–23:20	2.11 mi (3.40 km)	20 yd (18 m)
EF0	Minor tree damage occurred.						
EF1	SW of Dunlap	Morris	KS	38.5287°N 96.4286°W	23:26–23:30	1.08 mi (1.74 km)	30 yd (27 m)
EF1	This high-end EF1 tornado destroyed several sheds and outbuildings. A few homes were damaged as well.						
EFU	NW of Burns	Marion	KS	38.1091°N 96.923°W	23:40–23:42	0.28 mi (0.45 km)	30 yd (27 m)
EFU	A brief landspout was reported.						
EFU	ESE of Renfrow to N of Deer Creek	Grant	OK	36.8855°N 97.5622°W	23:42–23:44	2.4 mi (3.9 km)	50 yd (46 m)
EFU	A tornado was recorded. No damage was reported.						
EF0	ESE of Newton	Harvey	KS	38.0171°N 97.2574°W	23:48–23:53	0.32 mi (0.51 km)	40 yd (37 m)
EF0	This landspout blew sheet metal off of an outbuilding, a tree was uprooted, and a tractor was damaged from flying debris.						
EFU	SW of Elbing	Harvey	KS	38.0353°N 97.1772°W	23:48–23:52	0.02 mi (0.032 km)	30 yd (27 m)
EFU	A retired NWS employee reported a landspout.						
EF2	N of Nardin to SE of Braman	Kay	OK	36.8991°N 97.4543°W	00:00–00:32	10.4 mi (16.7 km)	400 yd (370 m)
EF2	Numerous wooden power poles were snapped or damaged, outbuildings and fences were damaged or destroyed, and trees were damaged, snapped, or uprooted.						
EF0	WSW of Braman (1st tornado)	Kay	OK	36.899°N 97.4243°W	00:07–00:08	0.4 mi (0.64 km)	30 yd (27 m)
EF0	A satellite tornado to the 0004 UTC EF1 tornado was captured on video.						
EF0	S of Allen to SSW of Admire	Lyon	KS	38.5949°N 96.1567°W	00:08–00:09	1.28 mi (2.06 km)	50 yd (46 m)
EF0	A tornado was recorded as it remained over an open field. No damage was noted.						
EFU	WSW of Braman (2nd tornado)	Kay	OK	36.9089°N 97.3759°W	00:15–00:20	2.9 mi (4.7 km)	50 yd (46 m)
EFU	Another satellite tornado to the 0004 UTC EF1 tornado was recorded, causing no damage.						
EF0	N of Winterset	Madison	IA	41.3809°N 94.0143°W	00:20–00:22	1.37 mi (2.20 km)	20 yd (18 m)
EF0	A weak tornado damaged a farm outbuilding and trees. A camper trailer was also flipped.						
EFU	N of Sunnydale	Sedgwick	KS	37.8865°N 97.2801°W	00:28–00:30	0.25 mi (0.40 km)	30 yd (27 m)
EFU	This brief landspout was reported and inflicted no damage.						
EF1	Northern Stanberry to NE of Mount Pleasant	Gentry	MO	40.2178°N 94.55°W	00:58-01:03	4.31 mi (6.94 km)	100 yd (91 m)
EF1	This tornado moved through northern Stanberry, damaging several homes.						
EF4	Southern Vance Air Force Base to ESE of Enid	Garfield	OK	36.326°N 97.928°W	01:11–01:48	9.5 mi (15.3 km)	600 yd (550 m)
EF4	See section on this tornado – One person was injured.						
EFU	SE of Newkirk	Kay	OK	36.8796°N 97.0445°W	01:13–01:18	0.6 mi (0.97 km)	50 yd (46 m)
EFU	A local TV meteorologist observed a tornado that remained over open land.						
EF1	NE of Van Wert to Weldon	Decatur	IA	40.89°N 93.77°W	01:42–01:46	2.17 mi (3.49 km)	150 yd (140 m)
EF1	Numerous tree branches were downed and several trees were snapped or uprooted.						
EF0	Northern Kansas City	Clay	MO	39.2999°N 94.5827°W	01:57-02:00	1.66 mi (2.67 km)	75 yd (69 m)
EF0	This tornado moved through the Nashua neighborhood of Kansas City, causing extensive tree damage. Several of the trees were downed onto vehicles and homes, damaging them.						
EF0	Southern Kearney	Clay	MO	39.3555°N 94.3671°W	02:11-02:13	1.13 mi (1.82 km)	100 yd (91 m)
EF0	A brief tornado caused damage to trees and homes.						
EF0	NE of Paradise to WSW of Lilly	Clay, Clinton	MO	39.4553°N 94.4915°W	02:11-02:15	1.47 mi (2.37 km)	50 yd (46 m)
EF0	Numerous trees and power poles were damaged.						

=== April 24 event ===
List of confirmed tornadoes – Friday, April 24, 2026
EF#	Location	County / Parish	State	Start Coord.	Time (UTC)	Path length	Max width
EF1	Western Joplin	Jasper	MO	37.0907°N 94.5515°W	05:14–05:19	1.1 mi (1.8 km)	200 yd (180 m)
EF1	This tornado touched down on a golf course in western Joplin, damaging an outdoor maintenance shed. As the tornado moved into residential areas, minor roof damage occurred to several homes. Numerous trees were downed, some of which also fell onto homes.						
EF0	W of Beaverton	Gladwin	MI	43.8716°N 84.5984°W	18:44–18:45	0.1 mi (0.16 km)	20 yd (18 m)
EF0	A weak tornado was captured on security cameras damaging outbuildings and objects on a farmstead.						
EF1	Kiowa	Pittsburg	OK	34.729°N 95.931°W	22:04–22:08	2.3 mi (3.7 km)	650 yd (590 m)
EF1	This tornado touched down developed northwest of Kiowa and moved southeast into the town. Homes were damaged, outbuildings were destroyed, power poles were snapped and numerous trees were uprooted, snapped or downed.						
EF0	SSW of Pattonville	Lamar	TX	33.4893°N 95.4726°W	01:39–01:40	0.71 mi (1.14 km)	100 yd (91 m)
EF0	A shipping container was moved, a boat dock was displaced, and trees were downed.						
EF1	S of Prentiss	Jefferson Davis	MS	31.5174°N 89.8972°W	03:23–03:28	1.58 mi (2.54 km)	150 yd (140 m)
EF1	A tornado caused damage to the siding of a home, uprooted trees and downed several large tree branches.						

=== April 25 event ===
List of confirmed tornadoes – Saturday, April 25, 2026
EF#	Location	County / Parish	State	Start Coord.	Time (UTC)	Path length	Max width
EF1	WNW of Learned	Hinds	MS	32.2314°N 90.6299°W	06:53–06:57	2.63 mi (4.23 km)	150 yd (140 m)
EF1	The roof of a barn was torn off, a metal carport was tossed and a home had minor roof damage. Numerous trees had their tops or branches snapped and a few other trees were uprooted.						
EF1	ENE of Crystal Springs	Copiah	MS	32.0152°N 90.2678°W	07:30–07:31	1.06 mi (1.71 km)	100 yd (91 m)
EF1	A tornado moved through Egypt Hill, downing multiple trees and tree limbs. A house and a shed both were damaged from falling trees.						
EF1	ESE of Terry to SSW of Florence	Rankin	MS	32.0754°N 90.2011°W	07:33–07:35	1.86 mi (2.99 km)	200 yd (180 m)
EF1	Several trees were uprooted and multiple large tree branches were downed onto utility lines.						
EF1	WSW of Braxton	Simpson	MS	32.0147°N 90.0096°W	07:50–07:53	1.67 mi (2.69 km)	300 yd (270 m)
EF1	Trees were uprooted and tree branches were broken.						
EF1	NE of Pinola	Simpson	MS	31.9178°N 89.9481°W	07:58–08:00	1.66 mi (2.67 km)	250 yd (230 m)
EF1	Multiple trees were uprooted.						
EF1	S of Mendenhall	Simpson	MS	31.9011°N 89.8784°W	08:04–08:08	2.72 mi (4.38 km)	250 yd (230 m)
EF1	Numerous trees were snapped or uprooted.						
EF0	Eastern Magee	Simpson	MS	31.8729°N 89.7294°W	08:16–08:18	2.21 mi (3.56 km)	100 yd (91 m)
EF0	Several large tree limbs were downed, power lines were downed, and multiple homes suffered shingle damage.						
EF1	NNE of Stringer	Jasper	MS	31.8976°N 89.2562°W	08:59–09:00	0.21 mi (0.34 km)	75 yd (69 m)
EF1	This brief tornado removed the roof of an outbuilding and uprooted and snapped several trees.						
EF0	W of Paulding	Jasper	MS	32.0268°N 89.0672°W	09:04–09:05	1.17 mi (1.88 km)	100 yd (91 m)
EF0	Trees were uprooted and large tree limbs were snapped.						
EF1	Gulfport (1st tornado)	Harrison	MS	30.4103°N 89.0983°W	11:26–11:31	3.01 mi (4.84 km)	200 yd (180 m)
EF1	The tornado touched down in Gulfport and moved south-southeast, producing primarily tree damage that included numerous large broken limbs, snapped trees, and an uprooted hardwood tree. It crossed US 49 with little apparent damage to commercial buildings, but later blew out garage doors on two metal buildings and caused additional tree damage as it continued. Minor roof damage occurred to a home near the end of the path before the tornado crossed US 90 and moved offshore into the Gulf of Mexico where it eventually dissipated.						
EF1	Gulfport (2nd tornado)	Harrison	MS	30.386°N 89.0778°W	11:29–11:31	1.81 mi (2.91 km)	150 yd (140 m)
EF1	This tornado moved southeast through Gulfport, snapped trees and downing numerous tree branches before lifting near the Gulf of Mexico coastline.						
EFU	SW of Bradshaw	York	NE	40.8606°N 97.7802°W	20:34		
EFU	A brief landspout that caused no damage was observed in an open field.						
EFU	NW of Scotland	Archer	TX	33.711°N 98.587°W	23:04–23:10	1.04 mi (1.67 km)	50 yd (46 m)
EFU	Numerous storm chasers and storm spotters observed a tornado that occurred over open pastureland. No damage was noted.						
EFU	NNW of Scotland	Archer	TX	33.6805°N 98.4946°W	23:18–23:20	0.3 mi (0.48 km)	50 yd (46 m)
EFU	A tornado was documented over open land.						
EFU	NE of Windthorst (1st tornado)	Clay	TX	33.618°N 98.364°W	23:46–23:49	0.5 mi (0.80 km)	100 yd (91 m)
EFU	This tornado remained over open rangeland, inflicting no damage.						
EFU	NE of Windthorst (2nd tornado)	Clay	TX	33.615°N 98.376°W	23:52–00:02	2.7 mi (4.3 km)	440 yd (400 m)
EFU	A tornado was widely observed by multiple storm chasers. No damage was reported as it remained over open fields.						
EF1	S of Joy to NNE of Shannon	Clay	TX	33.534°N 98.229°W	00:16–00:18	1 mi (1.6 km)	200 yd (180 m)
EF1	A hay barn was destroyed and windows were broken at a farmstead.						
EFU	NNE of Shannon	Clay	TX	33.6835°N 97.9934°W	00:18	0.2 mi (0.32 km)	150 yd (140 m)
EFU	A satellite tornado briefly occurred alongside the 0016 UTC tornado. No damage occurred.						
EF0	SSW of Roff	Pontotoc	OK	34.616°N 96.866°W	00:26–00:29	1 mi (1.6 km)	30 yd (27 m)
EF0	Several storm spotters and a research meteorologists observed a tornado that caused no damage.						
EF0	ESE of Pauls Valley	Garvin	OK	34.7123°N 97.1387°W	00:35	0.3 mi (0.48 km)	40 yd (37 m)
EF0	A storm chaser documented a brief tornado. No damage was reported.						
EF0	SE of Shannon	Jack	TX	33.4112°N 98.2002°W	00:43–00:52	4.36 mi (7.02 km)	250 yd (230 m)
EF0	This tornado caused scattered tree damage and minor damage to one home.						
EFU	ENE of Hickory	Pontotoc	OK	34.57°N 96.794°W	00:49–00:53	1.3 mi (2.1 km)	100 yd (91 m)
EFU	This tornado was observed by several storm chasers. It remained over open land causing no damage.						
EF1	SE of Shannon to NE of Jacksboro	Jack	TX	33.3614°N 98.1633°W	00:52–01:33	9.52 mi (15.32 km)	500 yd (460 m)
EF1	A tornado moved southeast through open terrain, producing mainly tree damage ranging from uprooted trees to snapped and twisted trunks, along with minor to moderate damage to a few homes, outbuildings, and oil storage tanks.						
EFU	E of Pauls Valley	Garvin	OK	34.74°N 97.0967°W	00:52–00:55	0.5 mi (0.80 km)	200 yd (180 m)
EFU	This tornado was posted on social media as it inflicted no damage.						
EF0	ESE of Reagan	Johnston	OK	34.3223°N 96.639°W	01:00	0.2 mi (0.32 km)	20 yd (18 m)
EF0	A brief tornado that caused no damage was reported by a storm chaser.						
EFU	E of Wynnewood	Garvin	OK	34.658°N 97.021°W	01:09–01:11	0.5 mi (0.80 km)	75 yd (69 m)
EFU	An off-duty SPC employee observed a tornado. No damage was noted.						
EF0	SSE of Mill Creek	Johnston	OK	34.344°N 96.816°W	01:13–01:14	0.5 mi (0.80 km)	20 yd (18 m)
EF0	A thin tornado was recorded.						
EF2	Runaway Bay	Wise	TX	33.163°N 97.884°W	02:03–02:07	1.41 mi (2.27 km)	650 yd (590 m)
EF2	1 death – See section on this tornado – 6 people were injured.						
EF1	WNW of Springtown to SW of Sanctuary	Parker	TX	32.9844°N 97.7297°W	02:42–03:10	9.95 mi (16.01 km)	1,150 yd (1,050 m)
EF1	This large tornado tracked southeast across primarily rural land, producing a broad swath of damage that included numerous downed large tree limbs and damage to lightweight structures and roofs. Most impacts were relatively minor, though two homes sustained more significant damage to their second stories.						

=== April 26 event ===
List of confirmed tornadoes – Sunday, April 26, 2026
EF#	Location	County / Parish	State	Start Coord.	Time (UTC)	Path length	Max width
EF1	SE of Wellsville	Miami	KS	38.6806°N 95.0481°W	21:20–21:25	1.96 mi (3.15 km)	50 yd (46 m)
EF1	An EF1 tornado was confirmed by NWS Pleasant Hill. Preliminary information.						
EF0	NW of Centerville to SE of Parker	Linn	KS	38.2582°N 95.0554°W	21:38–21:45	6.81 mi (10.96 km)	50 yd (46 m)
EF0	An EF0 tornado was confirmed by NWS Pleasant Hill. Preliminary information.						
EFU	S of Cope	Kit Carson	CO	39.54°N 102.8703°W	22:16–22:18	0.01 mi (0.016 km)	50 yd (46 m)
EFU	A landspout occurred over open land.						
EFU	NW of Sycamore	Wilson	KS	37.3889°N 95.7777°W	23:47–23:49	0.06 mi (0.097 km)	15 yd (14 m)
EFU	A tornado was documented causing no damage.						
EF1	WSW of Sycamore	Montgomery	KS	37.3302°N 95.7936°W	23:55–00:13	5.03 mi (8.10 km)	30 yd (27 m)
EF1	This tornado damaged farm outbuildings, including small grain bins.						
EF2	Southern Sycamore	Montgomery	KS	37.32°N 95.7283°W	00:09–00:23	4.59 mi (7.39 km)	400 yd (370 m)
EF2	A strong tornado damaged two homes just east of the Verdigris River, injuring the occupant in one of them.						
EF1	S of Foraker	Osage	OK	36.853°N 96.582°W	00:57–01:02	1.4 mi (2.3 km)	400 yd (370 m)
EF1	Power poles were snapped by this widely observed tornado.						
EFU	SSE of Foraker	Osage	OK	36.853°N 96.564°W	01:00–01:01	0.3 mi (0.48 km)	75 yd (69 m)
EFU	A satellite tornado occurred alongside the 0057 UTC tornado. No damage occurred.						
EFU	N of Pawhuska	Osage	OK	36.832°N 96.362°W	01:42–01:47	1.4 mi (2.3 km)	100 yd (91 m)
EFU	This tornado was observed and documented by research meteorologists as it remained over open country.						
EFU	NNE of Pawhuska	Osage	OK	36.799°N 96.287°W	01:57–02:01	1.4 mi (2.3 km)	100 yd (91 m)
EFU	Several storm chasers witnessed this tornado as it caused no damage over rural fields.						
EF0	E of Buffalo	Dallas	MO	37.6375°N 93.0581°W	02:33–02:38	0.88 mi (1.42 km)	100 yd (91 m)
EF0	A weak tornado broke windows on a mobile home, damaged several outbuildings, and downed large tree limbs.						
EF1	Eastern Hallowell to Sherwin	Cherokee	KS	37.1786°N 94.9953°W	02:43–02:49	4.4 mi (7.1 km)	500 yd (460 m)
EF1	A tornado caused uprooted and snapped several trees, overturned railcars, and significantly damaged grain bins. It also destroyed outbuildings and broke power poles.						
EF0	N of Pumpkin Center	Dallas	MO	37.78°N 93.06°W	03:22	0.01 mi (0.016 km)	50 yd (46 m)
EF0	This very brief tornado damaged several outbuildings, including a concrete block milk barn. Roofing tin from another barn was torn off and trees were uprooted.						

=== April 27 event ===
List of confirmed tornadoes – Monday, April 27, 2026
EF#	Location	County / Parish	State	Start Coord.	Time (UTC)	Path length	Max width
EF1	NNE of Reno	Leavenworth	KS	39.0735°N 95.1087°W	08:31–08:32	0.21 mi (0.34 km)	50 yd (46 m)
EF1	An outbuilding and multiple trees were damaged by this tornado.						
EF0	Eastern Spring Hill	Johnson	KS	38.7528°N 94.7972°W	11:38–11:39	0.14 mi (0.23 km)	25 yd (23 m)
EF0	This brief tornado uprooted or damaged trees.						
EF1	NW of Bucyrus	Johnson	KS	38.7384°N 94.7357°W	11:45–11:46	0.09 mi (0.14 km)	25 yd (23 m)
EF1	An EF1 tornado was confirmed by NWS Pleasant Hill. Preliminary information.						
EF2	WNW of Norton to Slater to Glasgow to SSE of Higbee	Saline, Chariton, Howard	MO	39.2039°N 93.1617°W	11:52–12:28	36.51 mi (58.76 km)	350 yd (320 m)
EF2	This long-track, low-end EF2 tornado developed southwest of Slater and moved northeast, initially causing sporadic tree damage before strengthening as it moved through town, where widespread tree damage occurred along with damage to homes and vehicles from falling tree limbs. It continued northeast, damaging grain bins and causing minor roof damage to nearby houses. The tornado then began producing more significant impacts in and around Gilliam, where severe tree damage, numerous snapped power poles, and heavy damage or destruction to barns and outbuildings were observed, with debris thrown long distances and irrigation pivots overturned. As it approached the Missouri River and moved into Glasgow, it caused additional significant tree, power line, and roof damage. The tornado began to weaken, with damage becoming primarily limited to trees and occasional property impacts as it continued east-northeast. It then eventually dissipated after producing further tree damage in rural areas.						
EF1	E of Oil City to NE of Renick	Chariton, Randolph	MO	39.3453°N 92.7985°W	12:11–12:36	24.48 mi (39.40 km)	300 yd (270 m)
EF1	This tornado touched down and produced significant tree damage with hundreds of treetops snapped along with damage to power poles and the collapse of multiple outbuildings. It crossed Route 129, where it damaged residences, additional outbuildings, and more tree groves. As it tracked east-northeast, it continued to produce substantial tree damage and caused more significant structural impacts, including the removal of the roof from a home with surrounding trees toppled in varying directions. The tornado dissipated over a field shortly afterwards.						
EF0	NW of Ryder to Renick to SSW of Middle Grove	Randolph	MO	39.3152°N 92.4632°W	12:29–12:37	8.58 mi (13.81 km)	50 yd (46 m)
EF0	A tornado touched down and caused roof damage to an outbuilding and also damaged several trees. The tornado then entered Renick, downing numerous trees throughout the village. It continued eastward, inflicting minor damage to residences, primarily from downing trees onto buildings, before lifting near the Randolph-Monroe county line.						
EF1	ESE of Middle Grove	Monroe	MO	39.3831°N 92.2273°W	12:43–12:44	1.79 mi (2.88 km)	400 yd (370 m)
EF1	A tornado downed large tree limbs and collapsed a farm outbuilding.						
EF0	SW of Marine	Madison	IL	38.7587°N 89.8004°W	18:41–18:42	0.33 mi (0.53 km)	25 yd (23 m)
EF0	This brief tornado damaged a mobile home and a metal building.						
EF1	NNW of Cortland to NE of Bobtown	Jackson	IN	39.0031°N 85.9808°W	20:44–20:49	3.71 mi (5.97 km)	100 yd (91 m)
EF1	A likely intermittent tornado snapped several trees and caused significant damage to barns, two of which were destroyed.						
EF1	N of Lake Fork to northern Mount Pulaski to S of Kenney	Logan, DeWitt	IL	40.0109°N 89.3581°W	23:14–23:30	14.95 mi (24.06 km)	400 yd (370 m)
EF1	This tornado touched down and moved east-northeast, initially causing minor tree damage. As it approached and moved through the north side of Mount Pulaski, it damaged trees, a machine shed, and several small grain silos. It then crossed IL 54, uprooting additional trees and tearing metal paneling from a barn, before continuing with mostly minor tree damage as it passed through Chestnut. The tornado continued to cause sporadic and weak damage before lifting.						
EF1	Rowell to E of Ospur	DeWitt	IL	40.069°N 89.0426°W	23:32–23:38	6 mi (9.7 km)	400 yd (370 m)
EF1	A tornado began and produced a path of mainly tree damage, snapping large trees and uprooting a few healthy ones before breaking a wooden power pole. It then caused minor roof damage to a residence and a barn near US 51, along with light structural and tree damage before dissipating.						
EF1	E of Ospur to Weldon to northern De Land	DeWitt, Piatt	IL	40.0912°N 88.8987°W	23:41–23:54	14.14 mi (22.76 km)	500 yd (460 m)
EF1	This tornado touched down over farmland, damaging several power poles and trees as it tracked east. The tornado then entered Weldon, snapped or uprooting trees and damaging roofs of homes. The tornado continued eastward, peeling back the roof of the DeLand-Weldon High School as it crossed IL 10. As it tracked through northern De Land, it snapped several tree branches and damaged some farm outbuildings before dissipating.						
EF1	N of Birkbeck	DeWitt	IL	40.1927°N 88.8704°W	23:42	0.61 mi (0.98 km)	75 yd (69 m)
EF1	This tornado collapsed a small machine shed.						
EFU	SW of Alton, IL	St. Charles	MO	38.8816°N 90.2002°W	23:48–23:49	0.61 mi (0.98 km)	10 yd (9.1 m)
EFU	A waterspout occurred over the Mississippi River.						
EF1	NE of De Land to northern Mahomet to NE of Lake of the Woods	Piatt, Champaign	IL	40.1467°N 88.6037°W	23:55–00:09	15.5 mi (24.9 km)	500 yd (460 m)
EF1	This tornado touched down and moved into Galesville, causing roof and structural damage to farm outbuildings. It continued east through northern Mahomet and Lake of the Woods where it inflicted extensive tree damage through the two cities. The tornado dissipated shortly after exiting Lake of the Woods.						
EF1	N of Mascoutah to SW of Aviston	St. Clair, Clinton	IL	38.5635°N 89.8084°W	00:53–01:03	9.65 mi (15.53 km)	350 yd (320 m)
EF1	This tornado broke several power poles, damaged numerous trees and caused roof damage to homes and outbuildings.						
EF0	ENE of Eminence	Shannon	MO	37.19°N 91.242°W	01:02–01:06	3.37 mi (5.42 km)	150 yd (140 m)
EF0	Intermittent tree damage was noted on satellite imagery.						
EF1	Germantown to S of Carlyle	Clinton	IL	38.5418°N 89.5728°W	01:06–01:18	11.66 mi (18.76 km)	350 yd (320 m)
EF1	This tornado touched down southwest of Germantown and damaged the roof of an outbuilding. It then moved northeast into the village, destroying one mobile home and damaging the roof of another. Tree damage occurred all throughout Germantown. The tornado exited the village and destroyed an outbuilding and flipped another before it ultimately lifted.						
EF1	Southern Mooresville	Morgan	IN	39.5931°N 86.3668°W	02:50–02:54	2.73 mi (4.39 km)	150 yd (140 m)
EF1	A tornado moved through southern Mooresville, snapping or uprooting numerous trees.						
EF0	SE of Mooresville	Morgan	IN	39.588°N 86.3173°W	02:54–02:55	0.84 mi (1.35 km)	50 yd (46 m)
EF0	Several healthy trees were snapped or uprooted.						
EF1	SW of Mountain View to WSW of Pleasant Grove	Stone	AR	35.8171°N 92.1601°W	03:30–03:55	13.5 mi (21.7 km)	400 yd (370 m)
EF1	This high-end EF1 tornado damaged multiple barns and outbuildings. Thousands of trees were snapped or uprooted.						
EF0	S of Ashbyburg	Hopkins, McLean	KY	37.526°N 87.4077°W	04:56–04:59	3.21 mi (5.17 km)	50 yd (46 m)
EF0	A weak tornado downed large tree limbs and snapped or uprooted multiple trees. Two cross arms on electronic transmission lines were also broken.						

=== April 28 event ===
List of confirmed tornadoes – Tuesday, April 28, 2026
EF#	Location	County / Parish	State	Start Coord.	Time (UTC)	Path length	Max width
EF1	NE of Semiway to E of Livermore	McLean	KY	37.5094°N 87.2178°W	05:08–05:15	6.56 mi (10.56 km)	125 yd (114 m)
EF1	This tornado caused extensive tree damage along its path, snapping trunks and uprooting numerous trees, with some falling onto homes and causing significant damage. Other homes sustained minor roof damage including shingle and fascia loss. A few power poles were also damaged.						
EF0	E of Tuckerman to NNW of Grubbs	Jackson	AR	35.7285°N 91.1085°W	05:16–05:17	0.6 mi (0.97 km)	50 yd (46 m)
EF0	A tornado bent some power poles.						
EF0	E of Livermore	Ohio	KY	37.4962°N 87.0568°W	05:19–05:21	1.9 mi (3.1 km)	150 yd (140 m)
EF0	Tree damage occurred.						
EF0	Eastern Dyersburg	Dyer	TN	36.0255°N 89.3634°W	05:25–05:27	0.98 mi (1.58 km)	100 yd (91 m)
EF0	This tornado touched down in southeastern Dyersburg and immediately caused significant damage to a warehouse, blowing out ten skylights and pulling a large metal panel off the side of the building. The tornado moved east, causing minor roof and tree damage before dissipating.						
EF1	NE of Hartford	Ohio	KY	37.4765°N 86.8806°W	05:30–05:34	1.81 mi (2.91 km)	110 yd (100 m)
EF1	This tornado caused damage to homes and trees along the KY 69 corridor.						
EFU	N of Greenfield	Poinsett	AR	35.7017°N 90.7303°W	05:48–05:49	0.52 mi (0.84 km)	50 yd (46 m)
EFU	A brief tornado occurred over open fields.						
EF0	E of Millerstown	Hart	KY	37.4426°N 86.042°W	06:24–06:25	1.03 mi (1.66 km)	150 yd (140 m)
EF0	This tornado caused tree damage.						
EF1	SW of Ridgetop	Davidson, Robertson	TN	36.3506°N 86.8376°W	07:28–07:30	1.57 mi (2.53 km)	150 yd (140 m)
EF1	A tornado snapped or uprooted hundreds of trees along its brief path. Approximately five barns and outbuildings were damaged as well.						
EFU	S of Sulphur	Murray	OK	34.435°N 96.975°W	19:35–19:36	0.5 mi (0.80 km)	100 yd (91 m)
EFU	A brief tornado was observed by a storm chaser near Lake of the Arbuckles.						
EF0	NE of Newport	Montague	TX	33.5251°N 97.9466°W	19:54–19:55	0.41 mi (0.66 km)	30 yd (27 m)
EF0	A brief tornado possibly damaged trees.						
EF1	NNW of Coleman to W of Tushka	Johnston, Atoka	OK	34.2967°N 96.4302°W	20:26–20:40	7.8 mi (12.6 km)	200 yd (180 m)
EF1	This tornado began near SH-48, where it damaged a barn by removing part of its metal roof and snapped nearby trees. As it moved east, it inflicted more tree and outbuilding damage before dissipating.						
EF0	S of Paradise	Wise	TX	33.0851°N 97.7065°W	20:33–20:35	1.55 mi (2.49 km)	250 yd (230 m)
EF0	A tornado tracked due south, producing scattered damage to trees, shingles and to the roofs of outbuildings.						
EF0	WSW of Peace Valley	Howell	MO	36.8182°N 91.7804°W	20:37–20:38	0.55 mi (0.89 km)	100 yd (91 m)
EF0	Trees were damaged.						
EF2	ESE of Coleman to SSE of Lane	Atoka	OK	34.2552°N 96.3203°W	20:37–21:08	20.59 mi (33.14 km)	1,500 yd (1,400 m)
EF2	This strong, high-end EF2 tornado touched down and caused minor roof damage to homes and overturned of a large metal tank before moving east and inflicting light tree and structural damage. It crossed US 69 just north of Caney, where several trees were snapped and uprooted. Further east, it continued causing damage to trees and outbuildings. The most significant damage occurred farther along its path where a mobile home was destroyed, other homes sustained varying degrees of roof damage, and large metal high-tension power poles were bent. Additional homes, barns, and a camper were significantly damaged before the tornado weakened, with only light damage occurring as it approached and dissipated just west of SH-109.						
EF1	N of Messer to S of Spencerville	Choctaw	OK	34.13°N 95.494°W	21:54–22:06	8.5 mi (13.7 km)	550 yd (500 m)
EF1	This tornado damaged one home and snapped or uprooted numerous trees.						
EF3	Eastern Mineral Wells	Palo Pinto, Parker	TX	32.8339°N 98.0717°W	21:58–22:10	5.11 mi (8.22 km)	800 yd (730 m)
EF3	See section on this tornado – 5 people were injured.						
EF0	N of Pollard	Clay	AR	36.459°N 90.2838°W	22:21–22:24	1.89 mi (3.04 km)	75 yd (69 m)
EF0	This tornado touched down and immediately uprooted a tree which fell onto an awning on a home, damaging it. The tornado then turned southeast, ripping metal roofing off of a barn and blowing a few shingles off of a church. It then crossed AR 139 and caused some minor tree damage before dissipating.						
EF0	E of Cresson	Johnson	TX	32.5374°N 97.6042°W	23:17–23:19	1.12 mi (1.80 km)	300 yd (270 m)
EF0	A brief tornado damaged crops and vegetation.						
EF0	Southwestern Cleburne	Johnson	TX	32.3311°N 97.4494°W	23:50–00:00	3.49 mi (5.62 km)	150 yd (140 m)
EF0	This tornado touched down in a park, causing minor tree damage before moving over Lake Pat Cleburne. As the tornado moved across the lake, it made landfall on the southeastern shore, damaging a small porch and the overhead doors to an RV storage, and then dissipated.						
EF1	NE of Rio Vista	Johnson	TX	32.2524°N 97.3654°W	00:10–00:15	2.03 mi (3.27 km)	100 yd (91 m)
EF1	A tornado produced mostly scattered damage as it moved southeast, including snapped or damaged trees and impacts to lightweight metal objects. It also caused roof damage to a manufactured home and partially removed the roof of another nearby residence before crossing FM 916 and lifted.						
EF2	Keevil to SSE of Brinkley	Monroe	AR	34.7881°N 91.2441°W	00:50–00:59	5.1 mi (8.2 km)	200 yd (180 m)
EF2	This strong tornado touched down near Keevil on AR 17 and moved east, initially producing tree damage before strengthening as it approached US 49, where it snapped multiple power poles and damaged a house and outbuilding. It then caused its most significant damage by completely destroying an abandoned farmhouse and snapping several large oak trees, along with numerous additional power poles. The tornado continued briefly with additional tree damage before ending in open fields.						
EF1	NE of Rose Bud	Cleburne, White	AR	35.3653°N 92.022°W	00:52–00:54	1.4 mi (2.3 km)	100 yd (91 m)
EF1	Numerous trees were snapped or uprooted and several tree branches were downed.						
EF0	SW of Fountain Hill	Ashley	AR	33.2917°N 91.8978°W	01:37–01:38	0.77 mi (1.24 km)	25 yd (23 m)
EF0	A brief tornado uprooted trees and leaned power poles.						
EF0	E of Elizabethtown	Hardin, LaRue	KY	37.6669°N 85.7382°W	01:52–01:55	2.24 mi (3.60 km)	50 yd (46 m)
EF0	This weak tornado damaged a playground and some trees.						
EF0	S of Swiftwater	Washington	MS	33.31°N 91.06°W	03:08	0.31 mi (0.50 km)	60 yd (55 m)
EF0	A few trees were uprooted and toppled.						

== See also ==
- Weather of 2026
- List of North American tornadoes and tornado outbreaks
- Tornadoes of 2026
- List of United States tornadoes in April 2026
- Lists of tornadoes and tornado outbreaks
