= List of United States tornadoes in April 2026 =

United States tornadoes in April 2026
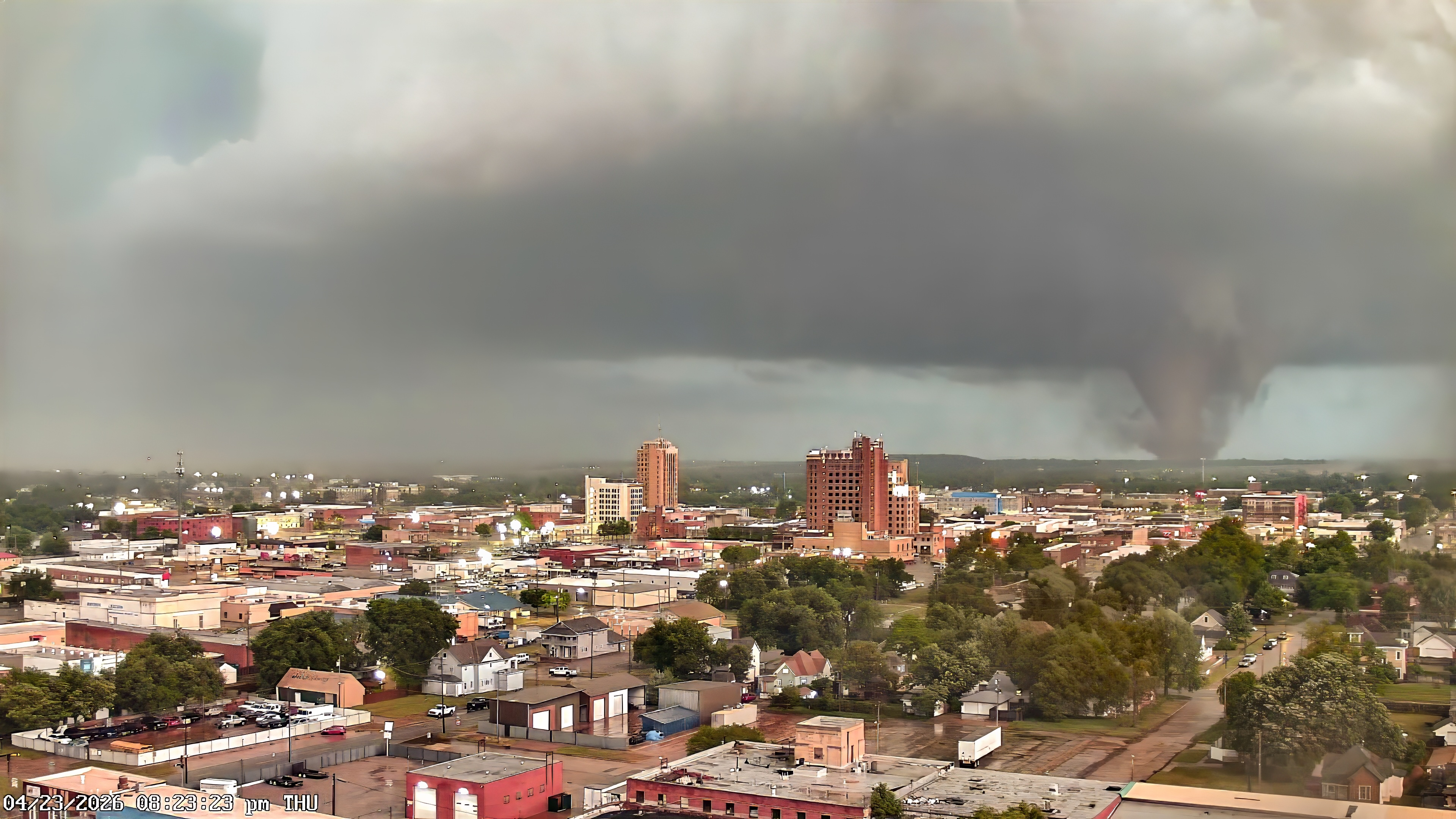
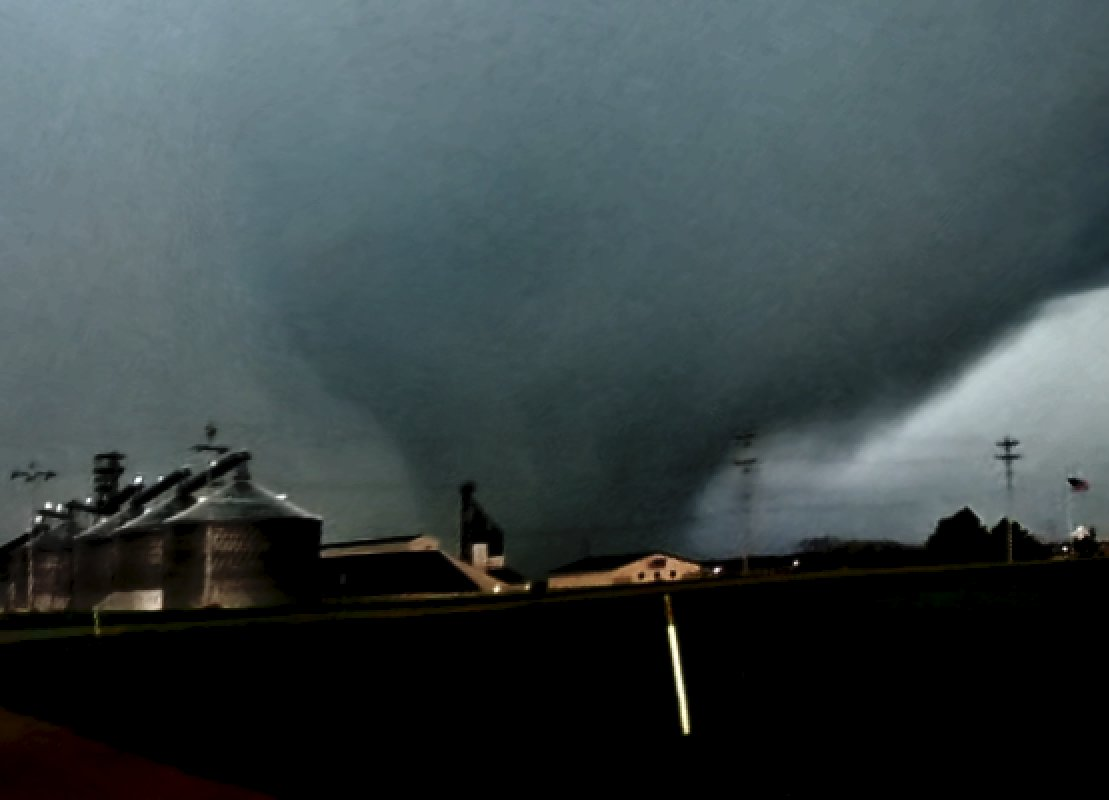
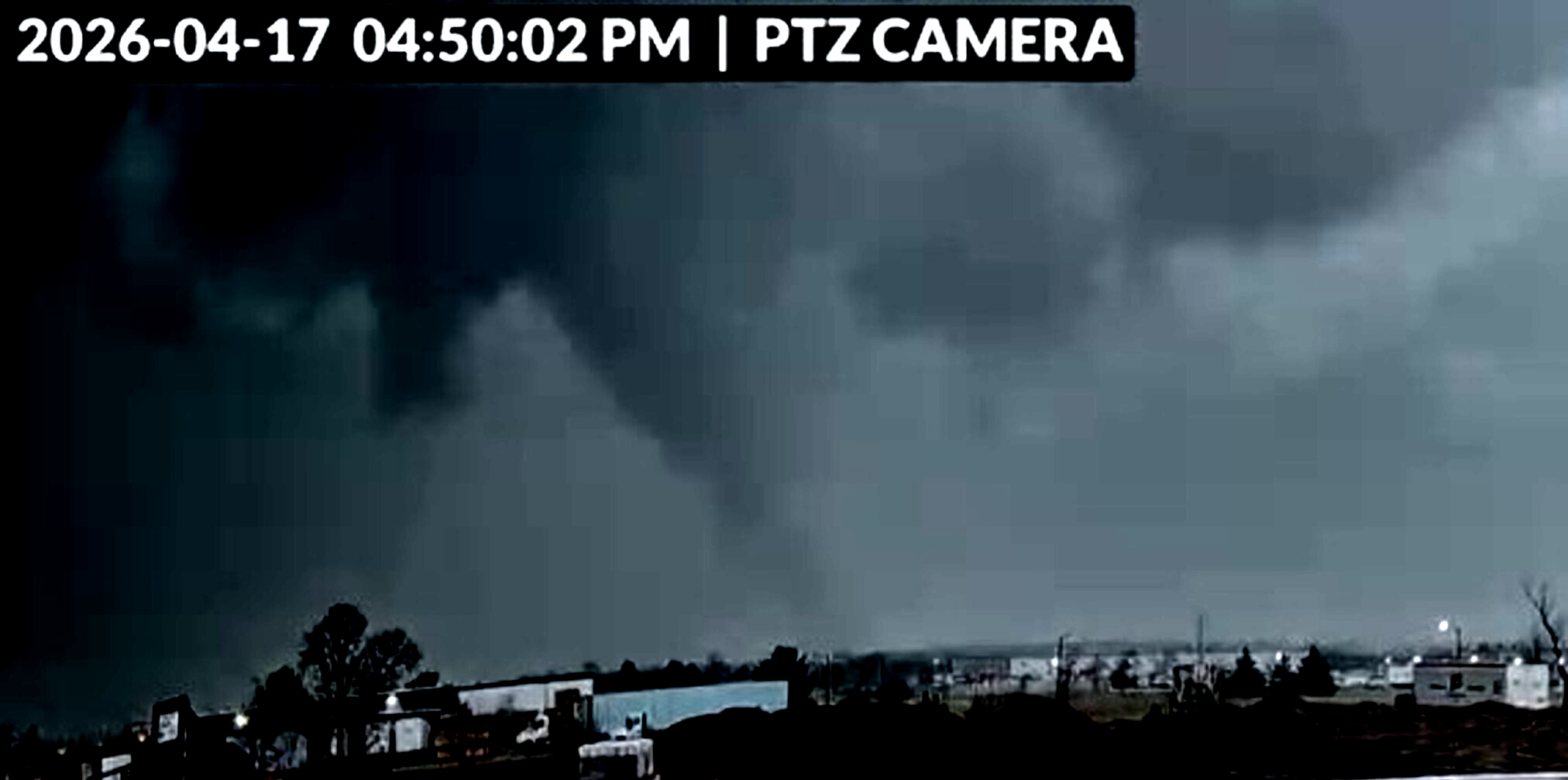
- Clockwise from top: Skycam view of an EF4 tornado near Enid, Oklahoma on April 23; an EF3 tornado near Ringle, Wisconsin on April 17; An EF2 tornado near Lena, Illinois on April 17
- Timespan: April 1–29
- Maximum rated tornado: EF4 tornado: Enid, Oklahoma on April 23
- Tornadoes: 297
- Fatalities: 1
- Injuries: 31

This page documents all tornadoes confirmed by various weather forecast offices of the National Weather Service in the United States in April 2026. Tornado counts are considered preliminary until final publication in the database of the National Centers for Environmental Information. Based on the 1991–2020 average, about 182 tornadoes occur in the United States in April. Activity also tends to spread northward and westward in April compared to the cooler winter months and the Midwest and Great Plains tend to see increased activity, although the relative maxima remains in the southern states.

The first half of April was relatively quiescent, with only sparse tornadic activity through the first 12 days of the month, continuing a trend from the second half of the previous month. Thereafter, activity picked up significantly, with 2 large outbreaks occurring in quick succession, followed by a large outbreak sequence to end the month that pushed the month well above average. This final outbreak sequence also contained the first violent tornado of 2026, which struck near Enid, Oklahoma. April finished well above average with 297 confirmed tornadoes during the month.

== April ==
Confirmed tornadoes by Enhanced Fujita rating
EFU	EF0	EF1	EF2	EF3	EF4	EF5	Total
43	90	142	17	4	1	0	297

=== April 1 event ===
List of confirmed tornadoes – Wednesday, April 1, 2026 (Note: All dates are based on the local time zone where the tornado touched down; however, all times are in Coordinated Universal Time for consistency.)
EF#	Location	County / Parish	State	Start Coord.	Time (UTC)	Path length	Max width
EF0	NW of Harrold	Wilbarger	TX	34.1335°N 99.0568°W	01:46–01:47	0.2 mi (0.32 km)	40 yd (37 m)
EF0	A storm chaser observed a tornado that caused no damage.						

=== April 2 event ===
List of confirmed tornadoes – Thursday, April 2, 2026
EF#	Location	County / Parish	State	Start Coord.	Time (UTC)	Path length	Max width
EF0	W of Serbin to Giddings	Lee	TX	30.13°N 97.03°W	15:35–15:55	7.69 mi (12.38 km)	50 yd (46 m)
EF0	This weak tornado damaged powerlines, tin sheds, and tree limbs. Some tin roofs and eaves were peeled back.						
EF1	SE of Richmond	Washington	IA	41.4264°N 91.7016°W	21:11–21:16	3.88 mi (6.24 km)	100 yd (91 m)
EF1	A tornado bent power poles, snapped and uprooted trees, and damaged several farm buildings, including a machine shed and three hog confinement buildings that were completely destroyed.						
EF0	SSW of Downey	Johnson, Muscatine	IA	41.5822°N 91.3869°W	21:36–21:39	2.5 mi (4.0 km)	50 yd (46 m)
EF0	This tornado lifted a corn crib, snapped trees, bent an auger, and partially destroyed the roof of a farm outbuilding.						
EFU	ESE of West Branch	Cedar	IA	41.65°N 91.28°W	21:45–21:47	0.08 mi (0.13 km)	
EFU	A brief rope tornado occurred.						
EF1	SW of Welton to Preston	Clinton, Jackson	IA	41.8983°N 90.6264°W	22:25–22:43	17.79 mi (28.63 km)	250 yd (230 m)
EF1	A tornado snapped over ten power poles, destroyed several outbuildings and sheds, tore the shingles off of numerous roofs of homes, and snapped many trees.						
EF0	Southern Galesburg	Knox	IL	40.9008°N 90.431°W	22:25–22:35	7.95 mi (12.79 km)	150 yd (140 m)
EF0	This tornado caused minor tree damage throughout southern Galesburg.						
EF1	ENE of Savanna	Carroll	IL	42.104°N 90.111°W	23:00–23:01	0.26 mi (0.42 km)	75 yd (69 m)
EF1	Some trees were downed and a shed was tossed.						
EF1	Northern Sterling	Whiteside	IL	41.797°N 89.7327°W	23:02–23:07	3.72 mi (5.99 km)	75 yd (69 m)
EF1	This tornado tracked through the northside of Sterling, snapping trees and removing the roofs off of two garages. Two church roofs were also damaged and a 3,000 pounds (1,400 kg) rooftop HVAC unit was rolled.						
EF1	W of Palmyra to SE of Woosung	Whiteside, Lee	IL	41.8467°N 89.6349°W	23:09–23:18	6.29 mi (10.12 km)	250 yd (230 m)
EF1	A tornado began in rural areas, where it initially left swirl marks in fields before it produced damage, which included downing power poles and causing significant damage at a property where multiple outbuildings were destroyed and several trees were snapped. As it moved northeast, it continued to produce tree damage and caused minor structural damage to a residence and a metal outbuilding. The tornado intensified as it struck another farm, damaging a barn, snapping more power poles, and pushing an old barn off its foundation into a grain leg, collapsing it, while also toppling a concrete silo. Continuing along its path, it caused additional roof and tree damage to homes and outbuildings before reaching the US 52 and IL 26 intersection, where a facility sustained damage as the tornado dissipated.						
EF1	S of Douglas to SE of Elba Center	Knox	IL	40.7789°N 90.0825°W	23:18–23:25	5.74 mi (9.24 km)	100 yd (91 m)
EF1	A tornado developed near IL 8, where it initially damaged an outbuilding before moving northeast and causing additional damage to another outbuilding and numerous large trees. As it continued, a couple of homes sustained minor roof and siding damage while more trees were snapped or damaged along its path. The tornado then produced additional tree damage dissipating near the Knox-Peoria county line.						
EF1	SE of Williamsfield to E of Laura	Knox, Peoria	IL	40.901°N 89.9874°W	23:18–23:26	6.2 mi (10.0 km)	250 yd (230 m)
EF1	This high-end EF1 tornado touched down and destroyed an outbuilding in Knox County before quickly moving into Peoria County. As it tracked east-northeast, the tornado snapped seven large power poles along IL 78. The tornado continued damaging trees before eventually lifting over fields.						
EF0	E of Elba Center to NW of Brimfield	Knox, Peoria	IL	40.8423°N 90.0114°W	23:23–23:28	3.67 mi (5.91 km)	60 yd (55 m)
EF0	A weak tornado damaged some trees and outbuildings.						
EF1	N of Grand Detour	Ogle	IL	41.9427°N 89.4146°W	23:24–23:25	0.58 mi (0.93 km)	80 yd (73 m)
EF1	This brief tornado damaged a few structures and trees, including one home which had two-thirds of its roof blown off.						
EF0	SE of Hollandsburg	Parke	IN	39.7456°N 87.0571°W	23:36–23:37	0.18 mi (0.29 km)	50 yd (46 m)
EF0	A brief, high-end EF0 tornado uprooted or snapped approximately forty trees, some of which landed on homes causing minor damage to siding.						
EF0	Holcomb	Ogle	IL	42.0585°N 89.1177°W	23:44–23:47	2.65 mi (4.26 km)	350 yd (320 m)
EF0	A high-end EF0 tornado began west-southwest of Holcomb, where it caused minor tree damage and peeled part of a sheet metal roof from a barn. As it entered Holcomb, it produced more widespread damage, including uprooted and snapped trees, a church with roof and window damage, several homes with minor roof and fascia damage, and a barn that was destroyed, while a grain leg collapsed and blocked nearby railroad tracks. The tornado then exited town and continued east-northeast, causing additional minor damage at a property along IL 251 before weakening and dissipating.						

=== April 3 event ===
List of confirmed tornadoes – Friday, April 3, 2026
EF#	Location	County / Parish	State	Start Coord.	Time (UTC)	Path length	Max width
EFU	SW of Hopedale	Tazewell	IL	40.3924°N 89.4717°W	23:00	0.18 mi (0.29 km)	20 yd (18 m)
EFU	Several storm chasers documented a very brief tornado. No damage was noted.						
EF1	Southwestern Oklahoma City	Oklahoma	OK	35.393°N 97.596°W	02:02–02:07	2.9 mi (4.7 km)	50 yd (46 m)
EF1	This east-southeastward-moving tornado developed east of Will Rogers World Airport, crossed I-44/US 62, and struck the Oklahoma City Community College (OCCC) campus, where a building suffered severe exterior wall damage along with shattered windows. Damage to roofs, sheds, fences, and trees also occurred in adjacent neighborhoods.						
EF0	Southeastern Oklahoma City	Oklahoma	OK	35.419°N 97.456°W	02:15–02:19	2.31 mi (3.72 km)	50 yd (46 m)
EF0	A weak tornado embedded within a much larger area of damaging straight-line winds caused tree damage to the west of Tinker Air Force Base.						
EF0	Dale	Pottawatomie	OK	35.39°N 97.06°W	02:47–02:51	4.6 mi (7.4 km)	40 yd (37 m)
EF0	This tornado formed west of Dale and caused sporadic damage as it moved east-southeast through the southern part of the town. The tornado then curved northeastward, damaging trees and powerlines as it passed over SH-270. The tornado then broke a power pole and uprooted a tree as it crossed US 177 before dissipating shortly thereafter.						
EF1	W of Aydelotte to N of Shawnee	Pottawatomie	OK	35.423°N 96.953°W	02:57–03:03	3.5 mi (5.6 km)	150 yd (140 m)
EF1	This tornado traveled erratically southeastward, initially causing sporadic tree damage. A concentrated area of tree damage saw trees uprooted by their root ball with others having their tops sheered off and even some tree debarking noted. Just before dissipating, the tornado ripped the canopy off of a Shell gas station and destroyed it as it crossed SH-18.						
EF1	WNW of Little	Seminole	OK	35.358°N 96.76°W	03:06–03:12	4 mi (6.4 km)	200 yd (180 m)
EF1	This tornado touched down well west to the west of Little, and moved northeastward, damaging, shearing, and uprooting trees with minor damage noted to outbuildings and a home. It then crossed I-40, causing additional tree damage before striking a greehouse facility, damaging several plastic greenhouses and damaging or destroying metal fence panels before dissipating.						

=== April 4 event ===
List of confirmed tornadoes – Saturday, April 4, 2026
EF#	Location	County / Parish	State	Start Coord.	Time (UTC)	Path length	Max width
EF1	E of Lindale	Smith	TX	32.5131°N 95.3839°W	15:20–15:28	2.48 mi (3.99 km)	32 yd (29 m)
EF1	A tornado began just south of FM 16, where it snapped tree limbs, broke a pecan tree trunk, and caused significant roof damage to a residence. It then crossed FM 16, producing additional minor roof damage to homes and downing more tree limbs as it moved northeast. Continuing along its path, the tornado caused more significant roof damage to another home and uprooted a large oak tree while intermittently snapping and downing large branches. Damage became more sporadic as the tornado weakened before eventually dissipating.						
EF1	Defiance	Defiance	OH	41.2564°N 84.3956°W	18:18–18:24	4.08 mi (6.57 km)	225 yd (206 m)
EF1	This tornado developed on the southwest side of Defiance where it initially caused minor shingle and tree damage, including at least one home likely destroyed by a fallen tree. The tornado produced more sporadic but significant tree damage through a cemetery as well. As it moved northeast, it intensified, snapping large tree trunks, lodging debris into a roof, and snapping wooden transmission lines. The tornado then continued into downtown Defiance where it caused widespread tree damage and minor to moderate roof damage to multiple businesses, including a church, bank, and post office. The tornado crossed the Maumee River and produced additional tree and roof damage in neighborhoods on the north side before continuing into a golf course where more trees were snapped or uprooted. The tornado dissipated shortly thereafter.						
EF1	Belleville	Wayne	MI	42.1788°N 83.5371°W	21:46–21:50	3.53 mi (5.68 km)	200 yd (180 m)
EF1	A tornado touched down and quickly flipped a hayride trailer before moving northeast and intensifying, producing damage that included multiple uprooted and snapped trees, snapped telephone poles, and a large barn wall blown out. As it continued, the tornado weakened and caused more scattered damage, including downed tree limbs and power lines before lifting.						
EF0	W of Folsom	St. Tammany	LA	30.64°N 90.23°W	00:46–00:48	0.34 mi (0.55 km)	25 yd (23 m)
EF0	A few trees were damaged, including one that was partially snapped.						

=== April 7 event ===
List of confirmed tornadoes – Tuesday, April 7, 2026
EF#	Location	County / Parish	State	Start Coord.	Time (UTC)	Path length	Max width
EF0	Palm Springs North	Miami-Dade	FL	25.9423°N 80.3323°W	20:45–20:46	0.57 mi (0.92 km)	10 yd (9.1 m)
EF0	A weak tornado caused scattered damage to fences, signs, power poles, and trees.						

=== April 11 event ===
List of confirmed tornadoes – Saturday, April 11, 2026
EF#	Location	County / Parish	State	Start Coord.	Time (UTC)	Path length	Max width
EFU	NE of Corona	Guadalupe	NM	34.3402°N 105.3327°W	19:54–20:04	0.77 mi (1.24 km)	30 yd (27 m)
EFU	A brief tornado was observed. No known damage occurred.						
EF1	WSW of Garden City	Rich, Cache	UT	41.91°N 111.49°W	20:25–20:27	0.44 mi (0.71 km)	100 yd (91 m)
EF1	This tornado snapped or uprooted numerous trees.						
EFU	NE of Chester	Thayer	NE	40.0319°N 97.5626°W	22:03		
EFU	A tornado that caused no damage was observed.						
EFU	NNE of Moran	Shackelford	TX	32.6595°N 99.1443°W	04:25–20:27	2.24 mi (3.60 km)	20 yd (18 m)
EFU	A tornado debris signature was observed on radar but no damage was found.						

=== April 12 event ===
List of confirmed tornadoes – Sunday, April 12, 2026
EF#	Location	County / Parish	State	Start Coord.	Time (UTC)	Path length	Max width
EFU	SE of Snowville	Box Elder	UT	41.91°N 111.49°W	20:20–20:23	Unknown	Unknown
EFU	This brief landspout was recorded along I-84. It remained over an open field and inflicted no damage.						
EFU	SE of Vina	Tehama	CA	39.9°N 122°W	21:05–21:06	0.1 mi (0.16 km)	15 yd (14 m)
EFU	A brief tornado was recorded in rural grassland. No damage occurred.						

=== April 13 event ===
List of confirmed tornadoes – Monday, April 13, 2026
EF#	Location	County / Parish	State	Start Coord.	Time (UTC)	Path length	Max width
EF0	NW of Gilman to SW of Hannibal	Taylor	WI	45.1884°N 90.8652°W	22:38–22:48	3.52 mi (5.66 km)	20 yd (18 m)
EF0	A few outbuildings had minor damage and several trees were broken.						
EFU	N of Truman	Watonwan	MN	43.8689°N 94.4598°W	23:12–23:13	0.68 mi (1.09 km)	25 yd (23 m)
EFU	Storm chasers observed a tornado that caused no damage.						
EF1	NNE of Truman to SSE of Willow Creek	Watonwan, Blue Earth	MN	43.8549°N 94.4237°W	23:15–23:40	8.42 mi (13.55 km)	200 yd (180 m)
EF1	This intermittent tornado snapped or uprooted several trees and damaged outbuildings.						
EFU	NE of Archer	O'Brien	IA	43.138°N 95.712°W	23:30–23:35	0.88 mi (1.42 km)	25 yd (23 m)
EFU	This tornado remained over open farmland. No damage was noted.						
EF1	NNE of Armstrong	Emmet, Kossuth	IA	43.4428°N 94.4602°W	23:47–23:49	1.17 mi (1.88 km)	30 yd (27 m)
EF1	An outbuilding along Iowa 15 was heavily damaged with most of its walls knocked down.						
EF2	N of Osgood to WSW of Ringsted	Palo Alto, Emmet	IA	43.2246°N 94.6898°W	23:47–23:55	4.77 mi (7.68 km)	100 yd (91 m)
EF2	A significant tornado removed part of the roof from one home, heavily damaged the roof of another home, and obliterated and swept away two outbuildings.						
EF0	NE of Quenemo	Osage	KS	38.5911°N 95.512°W	00:02–00:03	0.01 mi (0.016 km)	100 yd (91 m)
EF0	A storm chaser recorded a very brief tornado that caused no damage.						
EF1	SE of Pilot Grove to W of Elmore	Faribault	MN	43.5027°N 94.2085°W	00:15–00:26	4.49 mi (7.23 km)	50 yd (46 m)
EF1	A farm was struck, with tin being ripped off of a shed, garage doors being blown in, and trees broken.						
EF2	Southern Ottawa	Franklin	KS	38.6012°N 95.321°W	00:23–00:48	6.52 mi (10.49 km)	100 yd (91 m)
EF2	This strong tornado inflicted heavy damage to businesses and homes. EF2 damage occurred in the southern part of the city where a warehouse had an multiple sections of an exterior wall blown out, the second story was heavily damaged or completely removed from motel buildings with one-story motel buildings uproofed, and a home was uproofed with trees also falling on it. Another home east of the city was also unroofed at EF2 intensity. Trees and power poles were also damaged and fences were destroyed. Three people were injured.						
EF0	NNE of Webb	Clay	IA	42.961°N 95.011°W	00:49–00:52	1.84 mi (2.96 km)	50 yd (46 m)
EF0	A tornado occurred over open farm fields, inflicting damage to several trees on one farmstead.						
EF1	ESE of Blue Mound, KS to Worland, MO	Linn (KS), Bates (MO)	KS, MO	38.0651°N 94.971°W	01:00–01:43	21.22 mi (34.15 km)	200 yd (180 m)
EF1	This tornado developed in rural southwestern Linn County and moved east-northeast, initially causing significant tree damage at a residence before crossing K-31 and K-52, where additional tree damage occurred, including impacts in a cemetery and to nearby outbuildings. As it continued into the Sugar Valley community, it caused more severe damage by flipping campers, damaging docks and trees, and completely destroying a manufactured home that was thrown from its supports, resulting in two people being injured. The tornado then produced more tree and outbuilding damage at rural properties before crossing US 69 and continuing toward the Missouri state line, where damage became primarily confined to trees. It then crossed into Missouri, causing minor tree damage before lifting just after tracking through Worland.						
EF1	SE of Matawan	Freeborn	MN	43.8268°N 93.6051°W	01:05–01:14	2.61 mi (4.20 km)	140 yd (130 m)
EF1	The tornado destroyed three outbuildings, removed majority of the roof of a shed, snapped or broke several dozen trees, and caused minor to moderate roof damage to a homes.						
EFU	SSE of Critzer	Linn	KS	38.11°N 94.9°W	01:09–01:10	0.61 mi (0.98 km)	
EFU	A brief satellite tornado of the 0100 UTC EF1 tornado was observed.						
EF2	Hillsdale	Miami	KS	38.6651°N 94.8945°W	01:18–01:23	3.12 mi (5.02 km)	250 yd (230 m)
EF2	A strong tornado touched down on the eastern shore of Hillsdale Lake in Hillsdale State Park and caused damage at a campground and park headquarters before strengthening as it moved east. On its approach, the tornado intensified further as it tracked through Hillsdale, where a single-family home was heavily damaged, followed by significant damage to multiple storage facilities. The tornado weakened as it exited the community and moved through more rural areas, causing less severe damage before dissipating just short of US 169.						

=== April 14 event ===
List of confirmed tornadoes – Tuesday, April 14, 2026
EF#	Location	County / Parish	State	Start Coord.	Time (UTC)	Path length	Max width
EF0	S of Beaver Dam	Dodge	WI	43.4134°N 88.8432°W	05:44–05:45	0.27 mi (0.43 km)	50 yd (46 m)
EF0	A brief tornado near the Shaw Marsh Wildlife Area damaged a garage.						
EF1	S of Utica to N of Busseyville	Dane, Jefferson	WI	42.9511°N 89.1126°W	05:45–05:50	5.67 mi (9.12 km)	75 yd (69 m)
EF1	This tornado began west of I-39 and moved toward WIS 73, where it struck a farmstead and caused severe damage, completely destroying two metal barn structures and damaging a cement silo by lifting and breaking portions of its top. As it continued, additional debris was scattered across surrounding farmland before the tornado dissipated.						
EF0	S of Eldora	Hardin	IA	42.33°N 93.1018°W	20:14–20:17	1.21 mi (1.95 km)	30 yd (27 m)
EF0	This brief tornado caused damage to a barn.						
EF0	E of Eldora	Hardin	IA	42.3659°N 93.0494°W	20:22–20:24	0.62 mi (1.00 km)	30 yd (27 m)
EF0	This brief tornado uprooted trees.						
EF1	ESE of Winthrop to SE of Masonville	Buchanan, Delaware	IA	42.4535°N 91.6454°W	22:25–22:33	4.8 mi (7.7 km)	50 yd (46 m)
EF1	A tornado completely destroyed a barn. Additional outbuildings and numerous trees were also damaged. A semi-truck was flipped on US 20.						
EF3	NNE of Hillsboro to E of Elroy	Vernon, Juneau	WI	43.68°N 90.33°W	22:35–22:47	7.01 mi (11.28 km)	125 yd (114 m)
EF3	This intense tornado initially caused minor damage to a residence and several trees in eastern Vernon County before crossing into Juneau County, where it reached its peak intensity and destroyed the above-ground portion of a home. It continued eastward, causing significant tree damage before weakening as it approached WIS 80, where several additional homes and outbuildings were damaged. The tornado then turned northeast, producing intermittent tree and structural damage before dissipating.						
EF2	E of Merton to northern Sussex	Waukesha	WI	43.1466°N 88.2827°W	23:24–23:30	3.78 mi (6.08 km)	150 yd (140 m)
EF2	This strong tornado developed in a residential subdivision, initially causing mainly tree damage before intensifying near WIS 164, where it reached peak strength and damaged multiple businesses, including a well-anchored carport structure whose roof was completely blown off and carried several blocks away. It then continued east, causing additional damage to a church and several homes, along with continued tree damage, before weakening and dissipating east of Butler Nature Preserve.						
EF1	E of Briggsville to S of Endeavor	Marquette	WI	43.6504°N 89.5391°W	23:26–23:32	4.65 mi (7.48 km)	50 yd (46 m)
EF1	An onion farm sustained significant damage.						
EFU	S of Onslow	Jones	IA	42.0922°N 91.0539°W	23:27–23:32	2.59 mi (4.17 km)	10 yd (9.1 m)
EFU	Numerous storm chasers and spotters observed a tornado. No damage was reported.						
EF1	S of Dubuque	Dubuque	IA	42.4157°N 90.7432°W	23:36–23:40	3.14 mi (5.05 km)	25 yd (23 m)
EF1	A newly constructed home had its roof damaged and several trees were snapped or uprooted.						
EF1	N of Pearl City	Stephenson	IL	42.2876°N 89.8608°W	00:39–00:51	5.08 mi (8.18 km)	100 yd (91 m)
EF1	A tornado briefly developed northwest of Pearl City, where it caused significant damage by destroying several farm outbuildings, lifting a large farm wagon into another structure, and snapping multiple tree trunks and power poles. As it crossed IL 73, it continued to produce tree and structural damage before lifting.						
EF1	NNE of Elkhorn to W of Honey Creek	Walworth	WI	42.7395°N 88.4862°W	01:26–01:34	7.31 mi (11.76 km)	75 yd (69 m)
EF1	A tornado began west of I-43, where it heavily damaged two barns. It continued toward and across I-43, producing minor tree damage near a golf course. As it moved further east, it caused additional damage to barns, outbuildings, and trees eventually dissipating.						
EF1	N of Honey Creek to Waterford	Racine	WI	42.7822°N 88.302°W	01:38–01:44	5.17 mi (8.32 km)	75 yd (69 m)
EF1	A tornado touched down and initially damaged a barn by shifting it off its foundation before continuing southeast and removing sheet metal from a shed. As it moved through Waterford, it caused widespread tree damage, with numerous trees falling onto homes and some even lofted and deposited into the Fox River, resulting in additional structural impacts. The tornado then continued across the eastern side of town causing further tree and minor structural damage before dissipating near WIS 36.						
EF0	SE of Rochester to N of Eagle Lake	Racine	WI	42.7152°N 88.1939°W	01:42–01:48	3.77 mi (6.07 km)	50 yd (46 m)
EF0	Mainly tree damage occurred along with a barn having some roof damage.						
EF1	Somers to northern Kenosha	Kenosha	WI	42.6538°N 87.9302°W	02:02–02:08	3.98 mi (6.41 km)	150 yd (140 m)
EF1	This tornado downed trees onto several houses throughout Somers.						
EF1	E of Fenwick to Perrinton	Montcalm, Gratiot	MI	43.1457°N 85.0307°W	02:51–03:15	18.75 mi (30.18 km)	110 yd (100 m)
EF1	This high-end EF1 tornado snapped or uprooted numerous trees, heavily damaged over a dozen outbuildings and barns, and damaged the roofs of approximately ten homes.						
EF1	Southern Tulsa	Creek, Tulsa	OK	36.045°N 96.038°W	02:52–02:54	1.7 mi (2.7 km)	225 yd (206 m)
EF1	A tornado developed just outside of southern Tulsa and moved into the rural, southern section of the city, damaging several homes. Outbuildings were destroyed, trees were snapped or uprooted, power poles were broken and power lines were downed. The tornado ultimately dissipated near US 75.						
EF0	SW of Allegan to WNW of Otsego	Allegan	MI	42.484°N 85.91°W	03:38–03:48	6.5 mi (10.5 km)	100 yd (91 m)
EF0	Several hundred trees were damaged and multiple homes were impacted by downed trees. A couple other homes also had minor shingle and siding damage.						
EF1	E of Otsego to Hickory Corners	Allegan, Barry	MI	42.463°N 85.683°W	03:52–04:13	15.82 mi (25.46 km)	175 yd (160 m)
EF1	A tornado caused widespread tree damage along its path, heavily damaged several large barns, and removed roofing material from multiple homes and businesses or caused damage from fallen trees.						
EF1	NE of Chesaning to WNW of Burt	Saginaw	MI	43.2498°N 84.0715°W	03:53–03:58	3.68 mi (5.92 km)	880 yd (800 m)
EF1	This tornado began in an open field and initially produced minor damage by uprooting rows of pine trees and removing siding from an outbuilding before continuing northeast and causing additional tree damage. It then intensified, snapping both pine and hardwood trees, destroying outbuildings and empty silos, and damaging several homes, including one that lost most of its roof and had garage walls blown out. The tornado then weakened as it moved east, causing minor damage to another outbuilding with a collapsed door and wall before lifting shortly afterward in a field.						
EF1	NNE of Summit to southern Muskogee to ESE of Fort Gibson	Muskogee	OK	35.676°N 95.415°W	03:57–04:13	14.3 mi (23.0 km)	1,000 yd (910 m)
EF1	This tornado developed just east of US 69 near Summit, where it uprooted trees, damaged homes, and snapped power poles. The tornado continued northeastward, causing additional damage to numerous homes and trees as it crossed US 64, SH-351, the Arkansas River, and SH-10 before dissipating.						
EF0	SSW of Vernon to W of Durand	Shiawassee	MI	42.9095°N 84.0410°W	03:58–04:00	1.71 mi (2.75 km)	250 yd (230 m)
EF0	A weak tornado produced damage as it moved east, downing pine and hardwood trees and large limbs while causing minor structural damage including siding removed from a home, roof panels blown off an outbuilding, and collapsed barn doors before dissipating.						
EF0	E of Bridgeport to WNW of Frankenmuth	Saginaw	MI	43.3516°N 83.8196°W	04:06–04:08	0.6 mi (0.97 km)	50 yd (46 m)
EF0	This tornado produced minor damage as it moved southeast, damaging two barns with significant roof loss, stripping siding from a nearby home, and uprooting pine trees while breaking large limbs from trees before lifting in a field.						
EF1	Eastern Zeb to Park Hill to western Welling	Cherokee	OK	35.81°N 95.026°W	04:24–04:33	7.7 mi (12.4 km)	1,100 yd (1,000 m)
EF1	Numerous trees were uprooted, outbuildings were damaged, power poles were blown down and hundreds of large tree limbs were snapped.						
EF1	Northeastern Welling, OK to northern Christie, OK to WSW of Weddington, AR	Cherokee (OK), Adair (OK), Washington (AR)	OK, AR	35.901°N 94.832°W	04:38–05:02	24.2 mi (38.9 km)	800 yd (730 m)
EF1	Thousands of trees and tree limbs were snapped. A manufactured home also had some roof damage.						
EF1	Piney, OK to WSW of Lincoln, AR	Adair (OK), Washington (AR)	OK, AR	35.876°N 94.56°W	04:54–05:02	7.5 mi (12.1 km)	700 yd (640 m)
EF1	This tornado damaged outbuildings, several numerous trees and snapped numerous tree limbs.						

=== April 15 event ===
List of confirmed tornadoes – Wednesday, April 15, 2026
EF#	Location	County / Parish	State	Start Coord.	Time (UTC)	Path length	Max width
EF1	S of Coldwater to NNE of Crystal Beach	Branch	MI	41.8973°N 84.9895°W	05:04–05:07	2.59 mi (4.17 km)	100 yd (91 m)
EF1	A tornado initially caused minor and intermittent damage south of Coldwater, including a damaged barn with debris thrown into a nearby solar farm and light tree damage. The damage path became more consistent by I-69 where it damaged a pole barn at a business. As it moved southeast, it produced additional tree damage and caused structural impacts including a garage losing its roof, downed trees, and collapsed fencing, before striking another pole barn and throwing debris into a nearby field. The tornado dissipated shortly afterward.						
EF1	Ann Arbor	Washtenaw	MI	42.2837°N 83.7874°W	05:44–05:46	1.71 mi (2.75 km)	500 yd (460 m)
EF1	A high-end EF1 tornado began near I-94 and moved southeast, producing damage as it crossed a park where numerous trees were uprooted or snapped and stadium light poles were broken. It continued into nearby neighborhoods with a high concentration of damage, including widespread snapped trees and large downed limbs, before weakening as it moved farther southeast with more sporadic impacts. Along its later path, portions of an elementary school roof were blown off before the tornado lifted.						
EF1	Southern Melvindale to northern Lincoln Park	Wayne	MI	42.2723°N 83.1879°W	06:14–06:16	0.54 mi (0.87 km)	200 yd (180 m)
EF1	Homes had roof and shingle damaged, trees were snapped or uprooted, and businesses, including a Subway restaurant on Outer Drive, had their windows, roofs, facades, and equipment damaged.						
EF1	Clinton (1st tornado)	Henry	MO	38.3369°N 93.7908°W	23:03–23:07	2.5 mi (4.0 km)	
EF1	This tornado developed south of Clinton and moved northeast into the city, causing damage throughout the southern side of Clinton. The tornado dissipated just before reaching Route 18.						
EF0	Clinton (2nd tornado)	Henry	MO	38.3736°N 93.7703°W	23:09	1.85 mi (2.98 km)	30 yd (27 m)
EF0	A weak tornado touched down in Clinton and moved north-northeast, snapping several tree branches, uprooting a tree, and destroying an old farm building.						
EF0	SW of Machias	Cattaraugus	NY	42.391°N 78.513°W	00:13–00:14	0.17 mi (0.27 km)	55 yd (50 m)
EF0	A brief tornado uprooted trees and snapped tree branches while inflicting minor structural impacts including a blown-out window on one residence and slight shingle loss on another.						
EF0	S of Farmersville	Cattaraugus	NY	42.3623°N 78.3795°W	00:16–00:18	0.23 mi (0.37 km)	75 yd (69 m)
EF0	A small outbuilding was flipped and several trees were damaged.						
EF1	N of Delavan to W of Elkhorn	Walworth	WI	42.6853°N 88.6442°W	02:01–02:06	2.79 mi (4.49 km)	75 yd (69 m)
EF1	Four barns were damaged.						
EF1	E of Bigneck to WNW of Golden	Adams	IL	40.1371°N 91.0913°W	02:26–02:27	0.73 mi (1.17 km)	50 yd (46 m)
EF1	This brief tornado tracked along the north side of IL 61, damaging or destroying outbuildings along with damaging a home and trees.						

=== April 16 event ===
List of confirmed tornadoes – Thursday, April 16, 2026
EF#	Location	County / Parish	State	Start Coord.	Time (UTC)	Path length	Max width
EF1	SE of Williamstown	Orange	VT	44.0929°N 72.5271°W	01:15–01:17	0.53 mi (0.85 km)	200 yd (180 m)
EF1	Treetops were sheared and farm structures were damaged. This is only the third documented tornado in Orange County since reliable records began in 1950.						

=== April 17 event ===
List of confirmed tornadoes – Friday, April 17, 2026
EF#	Location	County / Parish	State	Start Coord.	Time (UTC)	Path length	Max width
EF0	NNE of Sargeant to SSE of Oslo	Mower, Dodge	MN		18:46–18:57	2.8 mi (4.5 km)	110 yd (100 m)
EF0	A grain silo had minor damage.						
EF0	SSE of Oslo to S of Rock Dell	Dodge, Olmsted	MN		18:55–19:07	4.85 mi (7.81 km)	150 yd (140 m)
EF0	A few farm buildings and trees sustained light damage.						
EFU	N of Nashville to WSW of Fulton	Jackson	IA		19:15–19:19	1.02 mi (1.64 km)	10 yd (9.1 m)
EFU	Storm spotters and storm chasers reported a tornado. No damage was noted.						
EF2	Northern Stewartville to southeastern Rochester	Olmsted	MN		19:19–19:36	9.71 mi (15.63 km)	250 yd (230 m)
EF2	This strong, high-end EF2 tornado formed in northern Stewartville and traveled northeast, damaging numerous homes and farmsteads along its path. The most significant damage occurred near US 52, where homes sustained severe impacts including roof removal and partially collapsed exterior walls. The tornado then lifted shortly after causing this damage. Three people were injured.						
EFU	N of Parkersburg	Butler	IA		19:32–19:36	1.59 mi (2.56 km)	10 yd (9.1 m)
EFU	An EFU tornado was confirmed by NWS Des Moines. Preliminary information.						
EF1	Northeastern Rochester to NNW of Elgin	Olmsted, Wabasha	MN		19:33–19:55	12.36 mi (19.89 km)	200 yd (180 m)
EF1	Minor damage to shingles occurred as the tornado touched down in northeastern Rochester. It then moved through rural areas, causing sporadic damage to farm outbuildings and trees.						
EF2	E of Viola to ESE of Plainview	Olmsted, Wabasha	MN		19:47–20:03	7.43 mi (11.96 km)	200 yd (180 m)
EF2	A significant tornado damaged trees and outbuildings. One home lost its roof and portions of its garage roof.						
EF0	WNW of Saratoga to S of Chester	Howard	IA		19:47–19:54	4.2 mi (6.8 km)	60 yd (55 m)
EF0	An outbuilding was damaged and a truck was rolled, injuring the driver.						
EF1	ESE of The Galena Territory to SW of Schapville	Jo Daviess	IL		19:47–19:54	3.7 mi (6.0 km)	100 yd (91 m)
EF1	This tornado damaged the awning of a house and sporadic tree damage.						
EFU	NE of Potter	Atchison	KS		20:08	0.02 mi (0.032 km)	
EFU	A storm chaser observed a brief tornado.						
EF3	S of Cream to N of Montana	Buffalo	WI		20:26–20:46	10.35 mi (16.66 km)	300 yd (270 m)
EF3	This intense tornado formed near Cream and tracked northeast over primarily forested terrain, causing widespread damage to trees and farm outbuildings as it intensified along its path. Near WIS 88, it produced its most significant damage by removing the roof and many exterior walls of a well-built home while numerous trees were snapped or uprooted in the surrounding area. The tornado then continued northeast, causing additional tree and structural damage before dissipating just to the north of Montana.						
EF2	NE of Kent to Lena to SW of Orangeville	Stephenson	IL		20:36–21:03	12.54 mi (20.18 km)	1,250 yd (1,140 m)
EF2	This large tornado first touched down along US 20 southwest of Lena first causing EF1 damage to trees. The tornado tracked northeastward, snapping and uprooting more trees and destroying power poles at EF2 intensity, as captured on a camera in Lena, wrapped in rain. The tornado then turned due east, moving directly into town, where it caused widespread and significant EF2 roof damage. A lot of houses had shingle and siding damage, while trees in the area were snapped or uprooted at EF2 intensity. The tornado then reached peak strength as it caused severe damage, where three houses lost their entire roof structure, and two other homes experienced partial exterior wall collapse. The tornado then turned back to the northeast, causing additional damage to farm structures and extensive tree damage before weakening and dissipating. The entire town was left without power.						
EF1	Olivet	Osage	KS		21:07–21:09	1.08 mi (1.74 km)	75 yd (69 m)
EF1	A tornado moved through Olivet, severely damaging several outbuildings. Metal siding, framing, and roofing debris were lofted several hundred yards to the northeast of the town.						
EF1	N of Blair	Trempealeau	WI		21:09–21:17	5.58 mi (8.98 km)	90 yd (82 m)
EF1	This high-end EF1 tornado snapped or uprooted hundreds of trees across rural areas.						
EFU	SE of Postville	Clayton	IA		21:17–21:18	0.57 mi (0.92 km)	20 yd (18 m)
EFU	A storm chaser recorded a brief tornado. No damage occurred.						
EF1	SE of Osseo to W of Price	Trempealeau, Jackson	WI		21:20–21:29	4.82 mi (7.76 km)	130 yd (120 m)
EF1	A tornado tracked through forested terrain and caused extensive damage to large swaths of trees throughout its path.						
EFU	N of Pecatonica	Winnebago	IL		21:35–21:37	0.69 mi (1.11 km)	50 yd (46 m)
EFU	A storm chaser documented a brief tornado in an open field.						
EF1	WNW of Glandon to S of Doering	Marathon, Lincoln	WI		21:44–21:55	4.33 mi (6.97 km)	100 yd (91 m)
EF1	This tornado developed near Glandon and caused significant damage to farm structures, including collapsing part of a barn, pushing a silo off its foundation, and tearing most of the roof and some walls from a metal outbuilding. As it moved north-northeast, it crossed WIS 64, downing trees and causing additional damage to garages and outbuildings. The tornado continued to produce tree and structural damage before weakening and dissipating.						
EF3	E of Kronenwetter to S of Johnson	Marathon	WI		21:46–22:03	13.53 mi (21.77 km)	600 yd (550 m)
EF3	See section on tornado						
EF1	S of Hatfield	Jackson	WI		21:52–21:56	2.34 mi (3.77 km)	150 yd (140 m)
EF1	A tornado developed on the banks of the Black River, causing extensive tree damage and minor damage to a home, before dissipating near the railroad tracks to the southeast of town.						
EF1	SSE of Harrison to SW of Rockton	Winnebago	IL		21:57–22:07	3.95 mi (6.36 km)	400 yd (370 m)
EF1	A tornado damaged farmsteads, destroyed outbuildings, and snapped or uprooted multiple trees. It reached peak intensity at a residence where most of the roof of a two-story home was removed, an old barn was destroyed, and additional trees were snapped. The tornado then turned sharply southward, weakened, and dissipated in an open field.						
EF1	E of West Chester to SSE of Richmond	Washington	IA		22:02–22:10	5.34 mi (8.59 km)	100 yd (91 m)
EF1	This tornado snapped numerous power poles and trees. Some farm outbuildings had their sheet metal roofs ripped off and a semi-truck was tipped over.						
EF1	Belton to Raymore	Cass	MO		22:19–22:29	4.81 mi (7.74 km)	100 yd (91 m)
EF1	This high-end EF1 tornado began on the south side of Belton and moved northeast through the city, damaging homes and trees through a neighborhood and across a cemetery. It then struck another neighborhood south of Route 58, producing additional structural and tree damage before weakening to more sporadic impacts. The tornado continued east-northeast, crossing I-49 and damaging the roofs of several homes in Raymore before lifting.						
EF1	SSE of Janesville	Rock	WI		23:02–23:05	1.89 mi (3.04 km)	75 yd (69 m)
EF1	A shed was damaged and multiple trees were snapped or uprooted.						
EF1	Emerald Grove	Rock	WI		23:05–23:10	2.06 mi (3.32 km)	100 yd (91 m)
EF1	This tornado tracked through Emerald Grove, destroying a barn and damaging an antique shop. Significant tree damage occurred as well.						
EF1	S of Johnstown Center to NNE of Fairfield	Rock, Walworth	WI		23:15–23:21	4.37 mi (7.03 km)	75 yd (69 m)
EF1	A multi-vortex tornado damaged multiple sheds.						
EF1	N of Darien to western Delavan	Walworth	WI		23:39–23:46	2.81 mi (4.52 km)	75 yd (69 m)
EF1	This tornado caused damage at four farmsteads, one of which had an empty silo's top half collapse. Multiple trees were damaged as well.						
EF0	Viola	Mercer	IL		23:40–23:42	0.95 mi (1.53 km)	50 yd (46 m)
EF0	This tornado caused mainly tree damage by uprooting, snapping, and shearing treetops, while also producing minor structural damage including uplifting half of a home's roof and damaging the brick facade of a business.						
EF1	N of Delavan	Walworth	WI		23:43–23:46	2.71 mi (4.36 km)	75 yd (69 m)
EF1	This tornado touched down on the banks of the Turtle Creek and tracked east-northeast. It destroyed a barn shed and damaged three barns, a garage, and a house before lifting.						
EF1	NE of West Point to Denver to SE of Bentley	Hancock	IL		23:55–00:03	5.67 mi (9.12 km)	150 yd (140 m)
EF1	A tornado developed southwest of Denver and tracked through town, snapping numerous trees and causing widespread damage to utility poles, with dozens broken or bent along its path. Structural damage also occurred, primarily to facades, windows, and roofs of homes and businesses.						
EF1	Southern Ponca City to McCord to SW of Apperson	Kay, Osage	OK		23:55–00:19	19.6 mi (31.5 km)	1,200 yd (1,100 m)
EF1	This tornado formed west-southwest of Ponca City and moved generally eastward across Business US 60 and parallel to US 60/US 177, causing sporadic EF0 tree and power pole damage on the south side of the town. After crossing US 77/Business US 60, the tornado intensified to EF1 strength as it crossed the Arkansas River into Osage County and struck McCord, uprooting or snapping numerous trees, damaging homes, and blowing down power poles. The tornado then paralleled the Arkansas River before crossing back over it into Kay County briefly. It then crossed the river again back into Osage County south of the Kaw Lake dam, uprooting and snapping numerous trees and damaging homes. The tornado then continued east-northeastward over open terrain before dissipating.						
EF1	E of Harrison to Roscoe	Winnebago	IL		00:03–00:17	10.88 mi (17.51 km)	350 yd (320 m)
EF1	A tornado touched down and immediately inflicted tree damage. It continued east before reaching peak intensity in residential subdivisions where multiple homes sustained roof, siding, and fascia damage, garage doors were blown in, and numerous trees were uprooted or damaged. It continued eastward into Roscoe, knocking down power poles and damaging a farm outbuilding before crossing the Rock River, where it produced more extensive tree damage and additional minor to moderate damage to homes. The tornado then dissipated near the Winnebago-Boone county line.						
EF1	SSE of Erie	Henry	IL		00:04–00:07	0.25 mi (0.40 km)	50 yd (46 m)
EF1	This brief tornado impacted a farmstead, damaging a few outbuildings and causing minor tree damage.						
EF1	E of Ponca City	Kay, Osage	OK		00:11–00:14	1.17 mi (1.88 km)	75 yd (69 m)
EF1	This brief tornado damaged boat shelters at the Hidaway Marina in McFadden Cove just northwest of the Kaw Lake dam. The tornado then crossed into Osage County, uprooting a few trees before dissipating.						
EF1	E of Middle Creek to ENE of Colmar	Hancock, McDonough	IL		00:13–00:21	6 mi (9.7 km)	75 yd (69 m)
EF1	This tornado damaged several outbuildings, including one that was destroyed. Multiple power poles were snapped or nearly blown over and numerous trees were snapped or uprooted.						
EF1	SE of Centerville to Toulon	Knox, Stark	IL		00:15–00:27	10.27 mi (16.53 km)	
EF1	A tornado touched down, causing damage to large tree limbs and power poles before moving northeast and crossing into Stark County. The tornado caused damage to shingles and siding and inflicted significant damage to a large outbuilding with portions of its metal roof removed. It continued producing intermittent tree damage and minor impacts to additional homes before entering Toulon, where it damaged an outbuilding, carport, and electrical poles. It then uprooted large trees and caused further roof and siding damage to homes. As the tornado exited town, it lifted over an open field.						
EF1	Northern Warsaw	Benton	MO		00:19–00:26	6.41 mi (10.32 km)	200 yd (180 m)
EF1	This tornado shattered windows at the Warsaw visitor center, inflicted roof damage to businesses, overturned and destroyed mobile homes at a storage facility, and damaged, snapped, or uprooted trees.						
EF0	ENE of Spring Prairie to W of Burlington	Walworth	WI		00:22–00:25	1.81 mi (2.91 km)	50 yd (46 m)
EF0	An intermittent tornado peeled two roofs, damaged siding on a garage, snapped several tree limbs and uprooted a few trees.						
EF0	Southern White Branch	Benton	MO		00:23–00:24	0.54 mi (0.87 km)	200 yd (180 m)
EF0	A metal building system was damaged along with several trees.						
EF1	S of White Branch	Benton	MO		00:25–00:27	1.61 mi (2.59 km)	150 yd (140 m)
EF1	This tornado damaged the roofing of an add-on building of the Warsaw High School and downed numerous trees.						
EF2	NE of Industry to WNW of Bernadotte	McDonough, Fulton	IL		00:29–00:44	12.82 mi (20.63 km)	200 yd (180 m)
EF2	This low-end EF2 tornado began northeast of Industry and moved eastward, snapping power poles and damaging trees and outbuildings. The tornado then turned sharply northeastward as it approached Fulton County, ripping half the roof off a home and snapping trees. The tornado then reached its peak intensity along the county line, snapping trees, obliterating a newer wood machine shed, destroying a newer grain bin, and causing roof, siding, and exterior wall damage to homes. Debris from the destroyed structures was thrown up to a 1/2 mi (0.80 km) to the northeast. The tornado then crossed US 136 northwest of Table Grove and gradually turned back to the east-northeast, damaging, uprooting, and snapping numerous trees before being absorbed by the 0040 UTC EF2 tornado below.						
EF0	S of Caldwell to W of Tichigan	Racine	WI		00:32–00:36	1.42 mi (2.29 km)	50 yd (46 m)
EF0	A trees and tree branches were downed. A port-a-potty was also displaced.						
EF2	E of Table Grove to Bryant	Fulton	IL		00:40–01:01	18.12 mi (29.16 km)	500 yd (460 m)
EF2	This tornado immediately reached its peak intensity of high-end EF2 right after it formed, snapping and shredding trees. The tornado then turned northeastward and absorbed the 0029 UTC EF2 tornado before turning back to the east-northeast, producing tree damage primarily with numerous trees uprooted and snapped. The tornado then moved through Bryant, causing a few roofs of outbuildings to be damaged before lifting just north of town.						
EF0	SSE of Stover to WNW of Gravois Mills	Morgan	MO		00:44–00:47	1.29 mi (2.08 km)	100 yd (91 m)
EF0	A barn and other outbuildings were damaged. Numerous trees were uprooted along with numerous large tree limbs downed.						
EF1	N of Gravois Mills	Morgan	MO		00:46–00:53	7.26 mi (11.68 km)	300 yd (270 m)
EF1	Several trees were uprooted, two outbuildings were damaged and a home had some of its windows broken.						
EF1	Bluff City to Bath to San Jose	Schuyler, Fulton, Mason, Logan	IL		00:50–01:26	36.71 mi (59.08 km)	
EF1	This long-track tornado touched down and immediately moved into Bluff City, snapping trees and destroying an outbuilding. It then crossed the Illinois River into Bath where some structural damage occurred, including collapsed walls. The tornado continued producing widespread damage by overturning irrigation pivots, snapping numerous trees, and destroying grain bins near IL 97. As it progressed through and beyond Biggs, tree damage remained extensive, with some of the most notable impacts occurring in San Jose where several large trees were snapped before the tornado lifted.						
EF0	Southern Muskego	Waukesha	WI		00:52–00:55	0.62 mi (1.00 km)	10 yd (9.1 m)
EF0	A few trees were snapped, and several large tree limbs were downed.						
EF0	W of Raymond to WNW of Kneeland	Racine	WI		00:55–01:00	3.45 mi (5.55 km)	50 yd (46 m)
EF0	This tornado damaged a few outbuildings and broke tree branches.						
EF1	Northern Raymond to Oak Creek	Racine, Milwaukee	WI		00:56–01:05	5.2 mi (8.4 km)	75 yd (69 m)
EF1	Outbuildings and trees were damaged.						
EF0	N of Barnett	Morgan	MO		00:59–01:01	1.28 mi (2.06 km)	150 yd (140 m)
EF0	This weak tornado lofted tree debris and bent metal rods for a hay bale shelter.						
EF0	SSE of Marion to Hartsburg	Cole, Boone	MO		01:08–01:12	3.52 mi (5.66 km)	50 yd (46 m)
EF0	A tornado snapped tree branches.						
EF1	N of Forest City to southern Manito to WNW of Dillon	Mason, Tazewell	IL		01:11–01:29	15.37 mi (24.74 km)	200 yd (180 m)
EF1	A tornado began just north of Forest City, producing substantial tree damage before moving northeast and damaging a small outbuilding. As it tracked into Manito, it snapped and uprooted trees, downed power lines, and peeled the roof off another outbuilding. The tornado then moved into Tazewell County where it caused additional tree damage and tipped an irrigation system. It continued across the Mackinaw River where tree damage was observed on both of the river banks. Sporadic damage continued until the tornado finally dissipated after leaning a few power poles.						
EF1	E of Arlington to NW of Earlville	Bureau, LaSalle	IL		01:12–01:32	17.62 mi (28.36 km)	300 yd (270 m)
EF1	A tornado began in rural Bureau County where it caused roof damage to a barn before moving northeast and producing additional damage to trees and farm outbuildings. As it continued, several wooden power poles were damaged and a semi-truck was blown over on I-39. The tornado then caused further tree and outbuilding damage near Meriden before weakening and dissipating in an open field north of US 34.						
EF1	SE of Kingston Mines to southern Pekin	Tazewell	IL		01:22–01:29	6.33 mi (10.19 km)	100 yd (91 m)
EF1	This tornado began and tracked along the southern shores of Powerton Lake, causing minor damage to trees. As it moved into southern Pekin, an industrial building sustained some roof damage and several tree trunks were snapped. The tornado then lifted over Meyers Lake.						
EF1	ENE of Greenview to Middletown	Menard, Logan	IL		01:26–01:32	5.88 mi (9.46 km)	300 yd (270 m)
EF1	Several trees were damaged, some of which were snapped.						
EF1	North Pekin to Marquette Heights	Tazewell	IL		01:27–01:30	2.31 mi (3.72 km)	70 yd (64 m)
EF1	A tornado moved through North Pekin and Marquette Heights, causing mainly tree damage but also damaging a few homes.						
EF1	NE of South Pekin to NW of Dillon	Tazewell	IL		01:27–01:29	2.32 mi (3.73 km)	
EF1	Several trees were snapped in a subdivision.						
EF1	SE of Delavan	Tazewell	IL		01:29–01:33	10.49 mi (16.88 km)	1,100 yd (1,000 m)
EF1	A tornado touched down south of Delavan and moved northeast, causing damage to farm structures including tearing part of the roof off a pig barn and tossing it into a nearby field, blowing in barn doors, and destroying a large machine building. It remained mostly over open fields as it continued, producing localized structural damage before dissipating shortly before reaching I-155.						
EF0	NE of Carrington to W of Fulton	Callaway	MO		01:31–01:34	2.27 mi (3.65 km)	50 yd (46 m)
EF0	This weak tornado snapped tree branches and damaged the roof of a building at the Fulton-Elton Hensley Memorial Airport.						
EF2	NE of Emden to SE of Hopedale	Tazewell	IL		01:34–01:38	4.03 mi (6.49 km)	1,000 yd (910 m)
EF2	This strong tornado started just outside of Boynton where it struck a farmstead, completely destroying a machine shed and snapped an evergreen. A 2x4 from the machine shed was driven into the house on the farmstead. The tornado continued northeast, snapping trees and damaging the roof of a pig barn before it lifted.						
EF0	Morton to S of Deer Creek	Tazewell, Woodford	IL		01:36–01:45	8.41 mi (13.53 km)	60 yd (55 m)
EF0	This high-end EF0 tornado touched down in northwestern Morton and damaged the roofs of a few warehouses around I-74. The tornado caused more roof damage to businesses in northern Morton and also snapped a power pole. The tornado almost paralleled I-74 and US 150, producing some minor tree damage before dissipating just after crossing US 150 and moving into Woodford County.						
EF1	N of Lowpoint	Woodford	IL		01:36–01:37	0.52 mi (0.84 km)	80 yd (73 m)
EF1	A well-built outbuilding was completely destroyed and another building sustained significant roofing damage.						
EF1	E of Tremont to Mackinaw to SSW of Congerville	Tazewell, McLean	IL		01:37–01:51	10.66 mi (17.16 km)	300 yd (270 m)
EF1	Several trees were damaged, a few homes had their siding damaged, and three large power poles were snapped.						
EF1	S of Minier to western Stanford to SE of Danvers	Tazewell, McLean	IL		01:41–01:53	12.42 mi (19.99 km)	300 yd (270 m)
EF1	This tornado caused damage to trees and farm outbuildings, one of which was destroyed.						
EF1	N of Armington to S of Minier	Tazewell	IL		01:42–01:43	1 mi (1.6 km)	200 yd (180 m)
EF1	Minor tree damage occurred and a portion of a machine shed's roof was blown off.						
EF2	E of Mackinaw to WNW of Danvers	Tazewell, McLean	IL		01:48–01:50	2.01 mi (3.23 km)	300 yd (270 m)
EF2	This strong tornado snapped seven large power poles and damaged several outbuildings. A large grain bin was tossed several hundred yards. Tree damage also occurred.						
EF1	SE of Funks Grove to Ellsworth to SE of Anchor	McLean	IL		01:54–02:27	33.82 mi (54.43 km)	150 yd (140 m)
EF1	This long-tracked tornado primarily damaged trees with some homes in the southern part of Downs suffering minor damage.						
EF1	Normal to Towanda	McLean	IL		01:56–02:06	11.31 mi (18.20 km)	900 yd (820 m)
EF1	This high-end EF1 tornado touched down west of Normal and moved into the western portions of the city, damaging several metal buildings before moving northeast and causing significant tree damage across parts of the city, including on the Illinois State University campus. It continued damaging trees as it moved out of town and flipped a semi-truck on I-55. The tornado then entered Towanda, where it caused minor damage before dissipating on the northeastern side of town.						
EF1	Bloomington to ESE of Lexington	McLean	IL		01:57–02:18	20.87 mi (33.59 km)	600 yd (550 m)
EF1	A high-end EF1 tornado developed I-55 and initially damaged a few greenhouses before moving northeast along Veterans Parkway, where it caused primarily tree damage through multiple golf courses and nearby areas. It then intensified slightly as it moved into residential sections, snapping trees and breaking several power poles on the eastern side of Bloomington. After exiting the city, the tornado caused additional impacts including snapped trees, damage to outbuildings, minor roof and soffit damage to a home, and more power pole damage. Near the end of its track, it damaged the roofs and doors of outbuildings and snapped another power pole and tree before lifting.						
EF1	SW of Chestnut	Logan	IL		01:57–02:01	1.65 mi (2.66 km)	50 yd (46 m)
EF1	A power pole was damaged.						
EF1	Rowell to SE of Ospur	DeWitt	IL		02:09–02:16	6.97 mi (11.22 km)	100 yd (91 m)
EF1	A tornado touched down in a rural area, damaging two farm outbuildings and a tree before. As it moved eastward, it snapped a power pole and the top of tree, throwing the latter 300 yards (270 m) to the east. It then crossed US 51 and caused additional minor damage to another outbuilding and tree before dissipating.						
EF1	Lexington	McLean	IL		02:15–02:16	0.34 mi (0.55 km)	25 yd (23 m)
EF1	Power poles and trees were snapped in Lexington. One home received minor roof damage.						
EF1	E of Pleasant Hill to SSW of Fairbury	McLean, Livingston	IL		02:19–02:27	7.9 mi (12.7 km)	50 yd (46 m)
EF1	A machine shed, power poles, power lines, and many trees were damaged.						
EF0	Saybrook to W of Derby	McLean	IL		02:24–02:27	3.2 mi (5.1 km)	75 yd (69 m)
EF0	Several trees were downed and multiple tree branches were broken in Saybrook.						
EF1	SSE of Pinckney	Franklin, Warren	MO		02:29–02:34	3.46 mi (5.57 km)	30 yd (27 m)
EF1	Multiple trees were uprooted.						
EF0	WNW of Dundee	Franklin, Warren	MO		02:32–02:34	1.71 mi (2.75 km)	25 yd (23 m)
EF0	A high-end EF0 tornado uprooted trees and downed tree branches.						
EF1	W of Gibson City to WNW of Elliott	Ford	IL		02:32–02:37	4.85 mi (7.81 km)	100 yd (91 m)
EF1	A tornado moved through Gibson City and caused significant roof damage to multiple buildings. The tornado exited the city, producing primarily tree damage before lifting in a field.						
EF1	N of Monticello	Piatt	IL		02:38–02:40	2.36 mi (3.80 km)	200 yd (180 m)
EF1	A concrete grain silo was collapsed and a machine shed was heavily damaged.						
EF1	SSW of Troy	Lincoln	MO		02:43–02:48	3.72 mi (5.99 km)	30 yd (27 m)
EF1	A tornado snapped a few trees and uprooted others.						
EF1	WNW of Loda to E of Buckley	Ford, Iroquois	IL		02:46–02:55	8.99 mi (14.47 km)	150 yd (140 m)
EF1	This tornado touched, immediately collapsing two empty grain bins before moving east-northeast and causing tree damage with numerous downed and uprooted trees, while also blowing over semi-trucks on Interstate 57. Near the end of its path, it removed the roof of a large outbuilding and snapped nearby trees at their base before lifting.						
EF0	E of Seymour to W of Bondville	Champaign	IL		02:51	0.88 mi (1.42 km)	50 yd (46 m)
EF0	A power pole and some trees were damaged.						
EF0	Woodland to SE of Watseka	Iroquois	IL		03:11–03:14	2.94 mi (4.73 km)	50 yd (46 m)
EF0	Trees and outbuildings were damaged.						
EF1	ESE of Woodland, IL to W of Kentland, IN	Iroquois (IL), Newton (IN)	IL, IN		03:14–03:25	11.43 mi (18.39 km)	125 yd (114 m)
EF1	This strong tornado struck multiple farms as it moved northeastward, damaging buildings and trees. It peaked in intensity as it crossed the state line, snapping over a dozen new wooden power poles. The tornado dissipated shortly after crossing US 24.						
EF0	N of Sun River Terrace to S of Grant Park	Kankakee	IL		03:15–03:21	5.48 mi (8.82 km)	75 yd (69 m)
EF0	A tornado caused scattered damage to trees, roofs of outbuildings, and power poles.						
EF1	SE of Kentland	Newton	IN		03:26–03:31	5.47 mi (8.80 km)	50 yd (46 m)
EF1	This narrow tornado initially downed large tree branches before peaking in intensity as it crossed US 41 southeast of Kentland. A billboard was blown over, a restaurant had most of its roof removed, a semitruck was pushed over, and a farm outbuilding was damaged. Debris was thrown nearly 2 miles (3.2 km) downstream into an open field north of US 24, which is where the tornado dissipated after crossing the highway.						
EF0	NNE of Sherburnville, IL to Lowell, IN to E of Lake Dalecarlia, IN	Kankakee (IL), Lake (IN)	IL, IN		03:28–03:38	10.23 mi (16.46 km)	250 yd (230 m)
EF0	A tornado began near the Illinois–Indiana border, producing tree damage and minor structural impacts before moving northeast and causing additional tree damage near US 41. As it tracked toward and through Lowell, it damaged a gas station canopy along SR 2 and blew out a garage wall at a residence, while continuing to produce scattered tree damage and minor structural impacts. The tornado then moved south of the Lake Dalecarlia area, where damage consisted mainly of downed trees and minor structural damage from falling debris, before dissipating prior to reaching SR 55.						
EF0	Tilton	Vermilion	IL		03:45	0.41 mi (0.66 km)	200 yd (180 m)
EF0	A few trees had minor damage in Tilton.						

=== April 18 event ===
List of confirmed tornadoes – Saturday, April 18, 2026
EF#	Location	County / Parish	State	Start Coord.	Time (UTC)	Path length	Max width
EF0	N of South Bend	St. Joseph	IN		04:51–04:53	1.28 mi (2.06 km)	200 yd (180 m)
EF0	Several trees were downed, a few of which fell onto buildings and damaged them.						

=== April 21 event ===
List of confirmed tornadoes – Tuesday, April 21, 2026
EF#	Location	County / Parish	State	Start Coord.	Time (UTC)	Path length	Max width
EF0	SE of Biola	Fresno	CA	36.7712°N 119.9947°W	21:10–21:12	1.93 mi (3.11 km)	50 yd (46 m)
EF0	An EF0 tornado was confirmed by NWS Hanford. Preliminary information.						
EF1	SW of Atwater	Merced	CA	37.3275°N 120.6492°W	22:30–22:39	0.37 mi (0.60 km)	100 yd (91 m)
EF1	An EF1 tornado was confirmed by NWS Hanford. Preliminary information.						
EF1	ENE of Clovis	Fresno	CA	36.879°N 119.5708°W	00:09–00:16	1.66 mi (2.67 km)	75 yd (69 m)
EF1	An EF1 tornado was confirmed by NWS Hanford. Preliminary information.						
EF0	Terra Bella	Tulare	CA	35.9598°N 119.0447°W	01:33–01:34	0.27 mi (0.43 km)	20 yd (18 m)
EF0	An EF0 tornado was confirmed by NWS Hanford. Preliminary information.						

=== April 22 event ===
List of confirmed tornadoes – Wednesday, April 22, 2026
EF#	Location	County / Parish	State	Start Coord.	Time (UTC)	Path length	Max width
EFU	ESE of Beaverville	Iroquois	IL	40.933°N 87.613°W	22:20–22:27	3.2 mi (5.1 km)	20 yd (18 m)
EFU	A landspout had several photos and videos taken of it. No known damage occurred.						

=== April 23 event ===
List of confirmed tornadoes – Thursday, April 23, 2026
EF#	Location	County / Parish	State	Start Coord.	Time (UTC)	Path length	Max width
EF1	N of Little Sioux to WNW of Pisgah	Harrison	IA		18:46–18:54	2.84 mi (4.57 km)	500 yd (460 m)
EF1	A tornado began in the Missouri River bottoms, flipping a center irrigation pivot. As it moved northeast, it inflicted damage to outbuildings, trees and power poles before flipping another irrigation pivot. The tornado then tore the roof off of a hoop barn before lifting.						
EFU	N of Fiscus	Audubon	IA		21:52	0.07 mi (0.11 km)	10 yd (9.1 m)
EFU	A tornado was recorded. No damage occurred.						
EF0	SE of Riverton (1st tornado)	Fremont	IA		22:34–22:37	1.76 mi (2.83 km)	80 yd (73 m)
EF0	This weak tornado caused minor damage to trees as it moved mostly over open fields.						
EFU	SE of Riverton (2nd tornado)	Fremont	IA		22:34–22:36	0.52 mi (0.84 km)	20 yd (18 m)
EFU	A tornado was recorded and photographed. No damage was noted.						
EF0	NW of Alma	Wabaunsee	KS		23:03–23:09	3.5 mi (5.6 km)	30 yd (27 m)
EF0	This weak tornado caused intermittent damage.						
EFU	SE of Volland	Wabaunsee	KS		23:04–23:05	0.5 mi (0.80 km)	30 yd (27 m)
EFU	A TDS was noted on radar however no damage was found.						
EF0	E of Coin to NNW of College Springs	Page	IA		23:17–23:20	2.11 mi (3.40 km)	20 yd (18 m)
EF0	Minor tree damage occurred.						
EF1	SW of Dunlap	Morris	KS		23:26–23:30	1.08 mi (1.74 km)	30 yd (27 m)
EF1	This high-end EF1 tornado destroyed several sheds and outbuildings. A few homes were damaged as well.						
EFU	NW of Burns	Marion	KS		23:40–23:42	0.28 mi (0.45 km)	30 yd (27 m)
EFU	A brief landspout was reported.						
EFU	ESE of Renfrow to N of Deer Creek	Grant	OK		23:42–23:44	2.4 mi (3.9 km)	50 yd (46 m)
EFU	A tornado was recorded. No damage was reported.						
EF0	ESE of Newton	Harvey	KS		23:48–23:53	0.32 mi (0.51 km)	40 yd (37 m)
EF0	This landspout blew sheet metal off of an outbuilding, a tree was uprooted, and a tractor was damaged from flying debris.						
EFU	SW of Elbing	Harvey	KS		23:48–23:52	0.02 mi (0.032 km)	30 yd (27 m)
EFU	A retired NWS employee reported a landspout.						
EF2	N of Nardin to SE of Braman	Kay	OK		00:00–00:32	10.4 mi (16.7 km)	400 yd (370 m)
EF2	Numerous wooden power poles were snapped or damaged, outbuildings and fences were damaged or destroyed, and trees were damaged, snapped, or uprooted.						
EF0	WSW of Braman (1st tornado)	Kay	OK		00:07–00:08	0.4 mi (0.64 km)	30 yd (27 m)
EF0	A satellite tornado to the 0004 UTC EF1 tornado was captured on video.						
EF0	S of Allen to SSW of Admire	Lyon	KS		00:08–00:09	1.28 mi (2.06 km)	50 yd (46 m)
EF0	A tornado was recorded as it remained over an open field. No damage was noted.						
EFU	WSW of Braman (2nd tornado)	Kay	OK		00:15–00:20	2.9 mi (4.7 km)	50 yd (46 m)
EFU	Another satellite tornado to the 0004 UTC EF1 tornado was recorded, causing no damage.						
EF0	N of Winterset	Madison	IA		00:20–00:22	1.37 mi (2.20 km)	20 yd (18 m)
EF0	A weak tornado damaged a farm outbuilding and trees. A camper trailer was also flipped.						
EFU	N of Sunnydale	Sedgwick	KS		00:28–00:30	0.25 mi (0.40 km)	30 yd (27 m)
EFU	This brief landspout was reported and inflicted no damage.						
EF1	Northern Stanberry to NE of Mount Pleasant	Gentry	MO		00:58-01:03	4.31 mi (6.94 km)	100 yd (91 m)
EF1	This tornado moved through northern Stanberry, damaging several homes.						
EF4	Southern Vance Air Force Base to ESE of Enid	Garfield	OK		01:11–01:48	9.5 mi (15.3 km)	600 yd (550 m)
EF4	See section on this tornado – Ten people were injured.						
EFU	SE of Newkirk	Kay	OK		01:13–01:18	0.6 mi (0.97 km)	50 yd (46 m)
EFU	A local TV meteorologist observed a tornado that remained over open land.						
EF1	NE of Van Wert to Weldon	Decatur	IA		01:42–01:46	2.17 mi (3.49 km)	150 yd (140 m)
EF1	Numerous tree branches were downed and several trees were snapped or uprooted.						
EF0	Northern Kansas City	Clay	MO		01:57-02:00	1.66 mi (2.67 km)	75 yd (69 m)
EF0	This tornado moved through the Nashua neighborhood of Kansas City, causing extensive tree damage. Several of the trees were downed onto vehicles and homes, damaging them.						
EF0	Southern Kearney	Clay	MO		02:11-02:13	1.13 mi (1.82 km)	100 yd (91 m)
EF0	A brief tornado caused damage to trees and homes.						
EF0	NE of Paradise to WSW of Lilly	Clay, Clinton	MO		02:11-02:15	1.47 mi (2.37 km)	50 yd (46 m)
EF0	Numerous trees and power poles were damaged.						

=== April 24 event ===
List of confirmed tornadoes – Friday, April 24, 2026
EF#	Location	County / Parish	State	Start Coord.	Time (UTC)	Path length	Max width
EF1	Western Joplin	Jasper	MO		05:14–05:19	1.1 mi (1.8 km)	200 yd (180 m)
EF1	This tornado touched down on a golf course in western Joplin, damaging an outdoor maintenance shed. As the tornado moved into residential areas, minor roof damage occurred to several homes. Numerous trees were downed, some of which also fell onto homes.						
EF0	W of Beaverton	Gladwin	MI		18:44–18:45	0.1 mi (0.16 km)	20 yd (18 m)
EF0	A weak tornado was captured on security cameras damaging outbuildings and objects on a farmstead.						
EF1	Kiowa	Pittsburg	OK		22:04–22:08	2.3 mi (3.7 km)	650 yd (590 m)
EF1	This tornado touched down developed northwest of Kiowa and moved southeast into the town. Homes were damaged, outbuildings were destroyed, power poles were snapped and numerous trees were uprooted, snapped or downed.						
EF0	SSW of Pattonville	Lamar	TX		01:39–01:40	0.71 mi (1.14 km)	100 yd (91 m)
EF0	A shipping container was moved, a boat dock was displaced, and trees were downed.						
EF1	S of Prentiss	Jefferson Davis	MS		03:23–03:28	1.58 mi (2.54 km)	150 yd (140 m)
EF1	A tornado caused damage to the siding of a home, uprooted trees and downed several large tree branches.						

=== April 25 event ===
List of confirmed tornadoes – Saturday, April 25, 2026
EF#	Location	County / Parish	State	Start Coord.	Time (UTC)	Path length	Max width
EF1	WNW of Learned	Hinds	MS		06:53–06:57	2.63 mi (4.23 km)	150 yd (140 m)
EF1	The roof of a barn was torn off, a metal carport was tossed and a home had minor roof damage. Numerous trees had their tops or branches snapped and a few other trees were uprooted.						
EF1	ENE of Crystal Springs	Copiah	MS		07:30–07:31	1.06 mi (1.71 km)	100 yd (91 m)
EF1	A tornado moved through Egypt Hill, downing multiple trees and tree limbs. A house and a shed both were damaged from falling trees.						
EF1	ESE of Terry to SSW of Florence	Rankin	MS		07:33–07:35	1.86 mi (2.99 km)	200 yd (180 m)
EF1	Several trees were uprooted and multiple large tree branches were downed onto utility lines.						
EF1	WSW of Braxton	Simpson	MS		07:50–07:53	1.67 mi (2.69 km)	300 yd (270 m)
EF1	Trees were uprooted and tree branches were broken.						
EF1	NE of Pinola	Simpson	MS		07:58–08:00	1.66 mi (2.67 km)	250 yd (230 m)
EF1	Multiple trees were uprooted.						
EF1	S of Mendenhall	Simpson	MS		08:04–08:08	2.72 mi (4.38 km)	250 yd (230 m)
EF1	Numerous trees were snapped or uprooted.						
EF0	Eastern Magee	Simpson	MS		08:16–08:18	2.21 mi (3.56 km)	100 yd (91 m)
EF0	Several large tree limbs were downed, power lines were downed, and multiple homes suffered shingle damage.						
EF1	NNE of Stringer	Jasper	MS		08:59–09:00	0.21 mi (0.34 km)	75 yd (69 m)
EF1	This brief tornado removed the roof of an outbuilding and uprooted and snapped several trees.						
EF0	W of Paulding	Jasper	MS		09:04–09:05	1.17 mi (1.88 km)	100 yd (91 m)
EF0	Trees were uprooted and large tree limbs were snapped.						
EF1	Gulfport (1st tornado)	Harrison	MS		11:26–11:31	3.01 mi (4.84 km)	200 yd (180 m)
EF1	The tornado touched down in Gulfport and moved south-southeast, producing primarily tree damage that included numerous large broken limbs, snapped trees, and an uprooted hardwood tree. It crossed US 49 with little apparent damage to commercial buildings, but later blew out garage doors on two metal buildings and caused additional tree damage as it continued. Minor roof damage occurred to a home near the end of the path before the tornado crossed US 90 and moved offshore into the Gulf of Mexico where it eventually dissipated.						
EF1	Gulfport (2nd tornado)	Harrison	MS		11:29–11:31	1.81 mi (2.91 km)	150 yd (140 m)
EF1	This tornado moved southeast through Gulfport, snapped trees and downing numerous tree branches before lifting near the Gulf of Mexico coastline.						
EFU	SW of Bradshaw	York	NE		20:34		
EFU	A brief landspout that caused no damage was observed in an open field.						
EFU	NW of Scotland	Archer	TX		23:04–23:10	1.04 mi (1.67 km)	50 yd (46 m)
EFU	Numerous storm chasers and storm spotters observed a tornado that occurred over open pastureland. No damage was noted.						
EFU	NNW of Scotland	Archer	TX		23:18–23:20	0.3 mi (0.48 km)	50 yd (46 m)
EFU	A tornado was documented over open land.						
EFU	NE of Windthorst (1st tornado)	Clay	TX		23:46–23:49	0.5 mi (0.80 km)	100 yd (91 m)
EFU	This tornado remained over open rangeland, inflicting no damage.						
EFU	NE of Windthorst (2nd tornado)	Clay	TX		23:52–00:02	2.7 mi (4.3 km)	440 yd (400 m)
EFU	A tornado was widely observed by multiple storm chasers. No damage was reported as it remained over open fields.						
EF1	S of Joy to NNE of Shannon	Clay	TX		00:16–00:18	1 mi (1.6 km)	200 yd (180 m)
EF1	A hay barn was destroyed and windows were broken at a farmstead.						
EFU	NNE of Shannon	Clay	TX		00:18	0.2 mi (0.32 km)	150 yd (140 m)
EFU	A satellite tornado briefly occurred alongside the 0016 UTC tornado. No damage occurred.						
EF0	SSW of Roff	Pontotoc	OK		00:26–00:29	1 mi (1.6 km)	30 yd (27 m)
EF0	Several storm spotters and a research meteorologists observed a tornado that caused no damage.						
EF0	ESE of Pauls Valley	Garvin	OK		00:35	0.3 mi (0.48 km)	40 yd (37 m)
EF0	A storm chaser documented a brief tornado. No damage was reported.						
EF0	SE of Shannon	Jack	TX		00:43–00:52	4.36 mi (7.02 km)	250 yd (230 m)
EF0	This tornado caused scattered tree damage and minor damage to one home.						
EFU	ENE of Hickory	Pontotoc	OK		00:49–00:53	1.3 mi (2.1 km)	100 yd (91 m)
EFU	This tornado was observed by several storm chasers. It remained over open land causing no damage.						
EF1	SE of Shannon to NE of Jacksboro	Jack	TX		00:52–01:33	9.52 mi (15.32 km)	500 yd (460 m)
EF1	A tornado moved southeast through open terrain, producing mainly tree damage ranging from uprooted trees to snapped and twisted trunks, along with minor to moderate damage to a few homes, outbuildings, and oil storage tanks.						
EFU	E of Pauls Valley	Garvin	OK		00:52–00:55	0.5 mi (0.80 km)	200 yd (180 m)
EFU	This tornado was posted on social media as it inflicted no damage.						
EF0	ESE of Reagan	Johnston	OK		01:00	0.2 mi (0.32 km)	20 yd (18 m)
EF0	A brief tornado that caused no damage was reported by a storm chaser.						
EFU	E of Wynnewood	Garvin	OK		01:09–01:11	0.5 mi (0.80 km)	75 yd (69 m)
EFU	An off-duty SPC employee observed a tornado. No damage was noted.						
EF0	SSE of Mill Creek	Johnston	OK		01:13–01:14	0.5 mi (0.80 km)	20 yd (18 m)
EF0	A thin tornado was recorded.						
EF2	Runaway Bay	Wise	TX		02:03–02:07	1.41 mi (2.27 km)	650 yd (590 m)
EF2	1 death – See section on this tornado – 6 people were injured.						
EF1	WNW of Springtown to SW of Sanctuary	Parker	TX		02:42–03:10	9.95 mi (16.01 km)	1,150 yd (1,050 m)
EF1	This large tornado tracked southeast across primarily rural land, producing a broad swath of damage that included numerous downed large tree limbs and damage to lightweight structures and roofs. Most impacts were relatively minor, though two homes sustained more significant damage to their second stories.						

=== April 26 event ===
List of confirmed tornadoes – Sunday, April 26, 2026
EF#	Location	County / Parish	State	Start Coord.	Time (UTC)	Path length	Max width
EF1	SE of Wellsville	Miami	KS		21:20–21:25	1.96 mi (3.15 km)	50 yd (46 m)
EF1	An EF1 tornado was confirmed by NWS Pleasant Hill. Preliminary information.						
EF0	NW of Centerville to SE of Parker	Linn	KS		21:38–21:45	6.81 mi (10.96 km)	50 yd (46 m)
EF0	An EF0 tornado was confirmed by NWS Pleasant Hill. Preliminary information.						
EFU	S of Cope	Kit Carson	CO		22:16–22:18	0.01 mi (0.016 km)	50 yd (46 m)
EFU	A landspout occurred over open land.						
EFU	NW of Sycamore	Wilson	KS		23:47–23:49	0.06 mi (0.097 km)	15 yd (14 m)
EFU	A tornado was documented causing no damage.						
EF1	WSW of Sycamore	Montgomery	KS		23:55–00:13	5.03 mi (8.10 km)	30 yd (27 m)
EF1	This tornado damaged farm outbuildings, including small grain bins.						
EF2	Southern Sycamore	Montgomery	KS		00:09–00:23	4.59 mi (7.39 km)	400 yd (370 m)
EF2	A strong tornado damaged two homes just east of the Verdigris River, injuring the occupant in one of them.						
EF1	S of Foraker	Osage	OK		00:57–01:02	1.4 mi (2.3 km)	400 yd (370 m)
EF1	Power poles were snapped by this widely observed tornado.						
EFU	SSE of Foraker	Osage	OK		01:00–01:01	0.3 mi (0.48 km)	75 yd (69 m)
EFU	A satellite tornado occurred alongside the 0057 UTC tornado. No damage occurred.						
EFU	N of Pawhuska	Osage	OK		01:42–01:47	1.4 mi (2.3 km)	100 yd (91 m)
EFU	This tornado was observed and documented by research meteorologists as it remained over open country.						
EFU	NNE of Pawhuska	Osage	OK		01:57–02:01	1.4 mi (2.3 km)	100 yd (91 m)
EFU	Several storm chasers witnessed this tornado as it caused no damage over rural fields.						
EF0	E of Buffalo	Dallas	MO		02:33–02:38	0.88 mi (1.42 km)	100 yd (91 m)
EF0	A weak tornado broke windows on a mobile home, damaged several outbuildings, and downed large tree limbs.						
EF1	Eastern Hallowell to Sherwin	Cherokee	KS		02:43–02:49	4.4 mi (7.1 km)	500 yd (460 m)
EF1	A tornado caused uprooted and snapped several trees, overturned railcars, and significantly damaged grain bins. It also destroyed outbuildings and broke power poles.						
EF0	N of Pumpkin Center	Dallas	MO		03:22	0.01 mi (0.016 km)	50 yd (46 m)
EF0	This very brief tornado damaged several outbuildings, including a concrete block milk barn. Roofing tin from another barn was torn off and trees were uprooted.						

=== April 27 event ===
List of confirmed tornadoes – Monday, April 27, 2026
EF#	Location	County / Parish	State	Start Coord.	Time (UTC)	Path length	Max width
EF1	NNE of Reno	Leavenworth	KS		08:31–08:32	0.21 mi (0.34 km)	50 yd (46 m)
EF1	An outbuilding and multiple trees were damaged by this tornado.						
EF0	Eastern Spring Hill	Johnson	KS		11:38–11:39	0.14 mi (0.23 km)	25 yd (23 m)
EF0	This brief tornado uprooted or damaged trees.						
EF1	NW of Bucyrus	Johnson	KS		11:45–11:46	0.09 mi (0.14 km)	25 yd (23 m)
EF1	An EF1 tornado was confirmed by NWS Pleasant Hill. Preliminary information.						
EF2	WNW of Norton to Slater to Glasgow to SSE of Higbee	Saline, Chariton, Howard	MO		11:52–12:28	36.51 mi (58.76 km)	350 yd (320 m)
EF2	This long-track, low-end EF2 tornado developed southwest of Slater and moved northeast, initially causing sporadic tree damage before strengthening as it moved through town, where widespread tree damage occurred along with damage to homes and vehicles from falling tree limbs. It continued northeast, damaging grain bins and causing minor roof damage to nearby houses. The tornado then began producing more significant impacts in and around Gilliam, where severe tree damage, numerous snapped power poles, and heavy damage or destruction to barns and outbuildings were observed, with debris thrown long distances and irrigation pivots overturned. As it approached the Missouri River and moved into Glasgow, it caused additional significant tree, power line, and roof damage. The tornado began to weaken, with damage becoming primarily limited to trees and occasional property impacts as it continued east-northeast. It then eventually dissipated after producing further tree damage in rural areas.						
EF1	E of Oil City to NE of Renick	Chariton, Randolph	MO		12:11–12:36	24.48 mi (39.40 km)	300 yd (270 m)
EF1	This tornado touched down and produced significant tree damage with hundreds of treetops snapped along with damage to power poles and the collapse of multiple outbuildings. It crossed Route 129, where it damaged residences, additional outbuildings, and more tree groves. As it tracked east-northeast, it continued to produce substantial tree damage and caused more significant structural impacts, including the removal of the roof from a home with surrounding trees toppled in varying directions. The tornado dissipated over a field shortly afterwards.						
EF0	NW of Ryder to Renick to SSW of Middle Grove	Randolph	MO		12:29–12:37	8.58 mi (13.81 km)	50 yd (46 m)
EF0	A tornado touched down and caused roof damage to an outbuilding and also damaged several trees. The tornado then entered Renick, downing numerous trees throughout the village. It continued eastward, inflicting minor damage to residences, primarily from downing trees onto buildings, before lifting near the Randolph-Monroe county line.						
EF1	ESE of Middle Grove	Monroe	MO		12:43–12:44	1.79 mi (2.88 km)	400 yd (370 m)
EF1	A tornado downed large tree limbs and collapsed a farm outbuilding.						
EF0	SW of Marine	Madison	IL		18:41–18:42	0.33 mi (0.53 km)	25 yd (23 m)
EF0	This brief tornado damaged a mobile home and a metal building.						
EF1	NNW of Cortland to NE of Bobtown	Jackson	IN		20:44–20:49	3.71 mi (5.97 km)	100 yd (91 m)
EF1	A likely intermittent tornado snapped several trees and caused significant damage to barns, two of which were destroyed.						
EF1	N of Lake Fork to northern Mount Pulaski to S of Kenney	Logan, DeWitt	IL		23:14–23:30	14.95 mi (24.06 km)	400 yd (370 m)
EF1	This tornado touched down and moved east-northeast, initially causing minor tree damage. As it approached and moved through the north side of Mount Pulaski, it damaged trees, a machine shed, and several small grain silos. It then crossed IL 54, uprooting additional trees and tearing metal paneling from a barn, before continuing with mostly minor tree damage as it passed through Chestnut. The tornado continued to cause sporadic and weak damage before lifting.						
EF1	Rowell to E of Ospur	DeWitt	IL		23:32–23:38	6 mi (9.7 km)	400 yd (370 m)
EF1	A tornado began and produced a path of mainly tree damage, snapping large trees and uprooting a few healthy ones before breaking a wooden power pole. It then caused minor roof damage to a residence and a barn near US 51, along with light structural and tree damage before dissipating.						
EF1	E of Ospur to Weldon to northern De Land	DeWitt, Piatt	IL		23:41–23:54	14.14 mi (22.76 km)	500 yd (460 m)
EF1	This tornado touched down over farmland, damaging several power poles and trees as it tracked east. The tornado then entered Weldon, snapped or uprooting trees and damaging roofs of homes. The tornado continued eastward, peeling back the roof of the DeLand-Weldon High School as it crossed IL 10. As it tracked through northern De Land, it snapped several tree branches and damaged some farm outbuildings before dissipating.						
EF1	N of Birkbeck	DeWitt	IL		23:42	0.61 mi (0.98 km)	75 yd (69 m)
EF1	This tornado collapsed a small machine shed.						
EFU	SW of Alton, IL	St. Charles	MO		23:48–23:49	0.61 mi (0.98 km)	10 yd (9.1 m)
EFU	A waterspout occurred over the Mississippi River.						
EF1	NE of De Land to northern Mahomet to NE of Lake of the Woods	Piatt, Champaign	IL		23:55–00:09	15.5 mi (24.9 km)	500 yd (460 m)
EF1	This tornado touched down and moved into Galesville, causing roof and structural damage to farm outbuildings. It continued east through northern Mahomet and Lake of the Woods where it inflicted extensive tree damage through the two cities. The tornado dissipated shortly after exiting Lake of the Woods.						
EF1	N of Mascoutah to SW of Aviston	St. Clair, Clinton	IL		00:53–01:03	9.65 mi (15.53 km)	350 yd (320 m)
EF1	This tornado broke several power poles, damaged numerous trees and caused roof damage to homes and outbuildings.						
EF0	ENE of Eminence	Shannon	MO		01:02–01:06	3.37 mi (5.42 km)	150 yd (140 m)
EF0	Intermittent tree damage was noted on satellite imagery.						
EF1	Germantown to S of Carlyle	Clinton	IL		01:06–01:18	11.66 mi (18.76 km)	350 yd (320 m)
EF1	This tornado touched down southwest of Germantown and damaged the roof of an outbuilding. It then moved northeast into the village, destroying one mobile home and damaging the roof of another. Tree damage occurred all throughout Germantown. The tornado exited the village and destroyed an outbuilding and flipped another before it ultimately lifted.						
EF1	Southern Mooresville	Morgan	IN		02:50–02:54	2.73 mi (4.39 km)	150 yd (140 m)
EF1	A tornado moved through southern Mooresville, snapping or uprooting numerous trees.						
EF0	SE of Mooresville	Morgan	IN		02:54–02:55	0.84 mi (1.35 km)	50 yd (46 m)
EF0	Several healthy trees were snapped or uprooted.						
EF1	SW of Mountain View to WSW of Pleasant Grove	Stone	AR		03:30–03:55	13.5 mi (21.7 km)	400 yd (370 m)
EF1	This high-end EF1 tornado damaged multiple barns and outbuildings. Thousands of trees were snapped or uprooted.						
EF0	S of Ashbyburg	Hopkins, McLean	KY		04:56–04:59	3.21 mi (5.17 km)	50 yd (46 m)
EF0	A weak tornado downed large tree limbs and snapped or uprooted multiple trees. Two cross arms on electronic transmission lines were also broken.						

=== April 28 event ===
List of confirmed tornadoes – Tuesday, April 28, 2026
EF#	Location	County / Parish	State	Start Coord.	Time (UTC)	Path length	Max width
EF1	NE of Semiway to E of Livermore	McLean	KY		05:08–05:15	6.56 mi (10.56 km)	125 yd (114 m)
EF1	This tornado caused extensive tree damage along its path, snapping trunks and uprooting numerous trees, with some falling onto homes and causing significant damage. Other homes sustained minor roof damage including shingle and fascia loss. A few power poles were also damaged.						
EF0	E of Tuckerman to NNW of Grubbs	Jackson	AR		05:16–05:17	0.6 mi (0.97 km)	50 yd (46 m)
EF0	A tornado bent some power poles.						
EF0	E of Livermore	Ohio	KY		05:19–05:21	1.9 mi (3.1 km)	150 yd (140 m)
EF0	Tree damage occurred.						
EF0	Eastern Dyersburg	Dyer	TN		05:25–05:27	0.98 mi (1.58 km)	100 yd (91 m)
EF0	This tornado touched down in southeastern Dyersburg and immediately caused significant damage to a warehouse, blowing out ten skylights and pulling a large metal panel off the side of the building. The tornado moved east, causing minor roof and tree damage before dissipating.						
EF1	NE of Hartford	Ohio	KY		05:30–05:34	1.81 mi (2.91 km)	110 yd (100 m)
EF1	This tornado caused damage to homes and trees along the KY 69 corridor.						
EFU	N of Greenfield	Poinsett	AR		05:48–05:49	0.52 mi (0.84 km)	50 yd (46 m)
EFU	A brief tornado occurred over open fields.						
EF0	E of Millerstown	Hart	KY		06:24–06:25	1.03 mi (1.66 km)	150 yd (140 m)
EF0	This tornado caused tree damage.						
EF1	SW of Ridgetop	Davidson, Robertson	TN		07:28–07:30	1.57 mi (2.53 km)	150 yd (140 m)
EF1	A tornado snapped or uprooted hundreds of trees along its brief path. Approximately five barns and outbuildings were damaged as well.						
EFU	S of Sulphur	Murray	OK		19:35–19:36	0.5 mi (0.80 km)	100 yd (91 m)
EFU	A brief tornado was observed by a storm chaser near Lake of the Arbuckles.						
EF0	NE of Newport	Montague	TX		19:54–19:55	0.41 mi (0.66 km)	30 yd (27 m)
EF0	A brief tornado possibly damaged trees.						
EF1	NNW of Coleman to W of Tushka	Johnston, Atoka	OK		20:26–20:40	7.8 mi (12.6 km)	200 yd (180 m)
EF1	This tornado began near SH-48, where it damaged a barn by removing part of its metal roof and snapped nearby trees. As it moved east, it inflicted more tree and outbuilding damage before dissipating.						
EF0	S of Paradise	Wise	TX		20:33–20:35	1.55 mi (2.49 km)	250 yd (230 m)
EF0	A tornado tracked due south, producing scattered damage to trees, shingles and to the roofs of outbuildings.						
EF0	WSW of Peace Valley	Howell	MO		20:37–20:38	0.55 mi (0.89 km)	100 yd (91 m)
EF0	Trees were damaged.						
EF2	ESE of Coleman to SSE of Lane	Atoka	OK		20:37–21:08	20.59 mi (33.14 km)	1,500 yd (1,400 m)
EF2	This strong, high-end EF2 tornado touched down and caused minor roof damage to homes and overturned of a large metal tank before moving east and inflicting light tree and structural damage. It crossed US 69 just north of Caney, where several trees were snapped and uprooted. Further east, it continued causing damage to trees and outbuildings. The most significant damage occurred farther along its path where a mobile home was destroyed, other homes sustained varying degrees of roof damage, and large metal high-tension power poles were bent. Additional homes, barns, and a camper were significantly damaged before the tornado weakened, with only light damage occurring as it approached and dissipated just west of SH-109.						
EF1	N of Messer to S of Spencerville	Choctaw	OK		21:54–22:06	8.5 mi (13.7 km)	550 yd (500 m)
EF1	This tornado damaged one home and snapped or uprooted numerous trees.						
EF3	Eastern Mineral Wells	Palo Pinto, Parker	TX		21:58–22:10	4.66 mi (7.50 km)	800 yd (730 m)
EF3	See section on this tornado – 5 people were injured.						
EF0	N of Pollard	Clay	AR		22:21–22:24	1.89 mi (3.04 km)	75 yd (69 m)
EF0	This tornado touched down and immediately uprooted a tree which fell onto an awning on a home, damaging it. The tornado then turned southeast, ripping metal roofing off of a barn and blowing a few shingles off of a church. It then crossed AR 139 and caused some minor tree damage before dissipating.						
EF0	E of Cresson	Johnson	TX		23:17–23:19	1.12 mi (1.80 km)	300 yd (270 m)
EF0	A brief tornado damaged crops and vegetation.						
EF0	Southwestern Cleburne	Johnson	TX		23:50–00:00	3.49 mi (5.62 km)	150 yd (140 m)
EF0	This tornado touched down in a park, causing minor tree damage before moving over Lake Pat Cleburne. As the tornado moved across the lake, it made landfall on the southeastern shore, damaging a small porch and the overhead doors to an RV storage, and then dissipated.						
EF1	NE of Rio Vista	Johnson	TX		00:10–00:15	2.03 mi (3.27 km)	100 yd (91 m)
EF1	A tornado produced mostly scattered damage as it moved southeast, including snapped or damaged trees and impacts to lightweight metal objects. It also caused roof damage to a manufactured home and partially removed the roof of another nearby residence before crossing FM 916 and lifted.						
EF2	Keevil to SSE of Brinkley	Monroe	AR		00:50–00:59	5.1 mi (8.2 km)	200 yd (180 m)
EF2	This strong tornado touched down near Keevil on AR 17 and moved east, initially producing tree damage before strengthening as it approached US 49, where it snapped multiple power poles and damaged a house and outbuilding. It then caused its most significant damage by completely destroying an abandoned farmhouse and snapping several large oak trees, along with numerous additional power poles. The tornado continued briefly with additional tree damage before ending in open fields.						
EF1	NE of Rose Bud	Cleburne, White	AR		00:52–00:54	1.4 mi (2.3 km)	100 yd (91 m)
EF1	Numerous trees were snapped or uprooted and several tree branches were downed.						
EF0	SW of Fountain Hill	Ashley	AR		01:37–01:38	0.77 mi (1.24 km)	25 yd (23 m)
EF0	A brief tornado uprooted trees and leaned power poles.						
EF0	E of Elizabethtown	Hardin, LaRue	KY		01:52–01:55	2.24 mi (3.60 km)	50 yd (46 m)
EF0	This weak tornado damaged a playground and some trees.						
EF0	S of Swiftwater	Washington	MS		03:08	0.31 mi (0.50 km)	60 yd (55 m)
EF0	A few trees were uprooted and toppled.						

=== April 29 event ===
List of confirmed tornadoes – Wednesday, April 29, 2026
EF#	Location	County / Parish	State	Start Coord.	Time (UTC)	Path length	Max width
EF1	NE of Fayetteville to Lookout	Fayette	WV	38.0811°N 81.0528°W	20:03–20:10	5 mi (8.0 km)	250 yd (230 m)
EF1	This tornado moved over forested and hilly terrain, primarily causing tree damage. A couple of structures suffered minor roof damage.						
EF0	W of Heidelberg	Jasper	MS	31.89°N 89.1°W	20:07	0.85 mi (1.37 km)	100 yd (91 m)
EF0	Multiple large branches were broken and a tree was uprooted.						

== See also ==
- Tornadoes of 2026
- List of United States tornadoes from January to March 2026
- List of United States tornadoes from May to June 2026
