= Valley Center USD 262 =

Public school district in Valley Center, Kansas

Address
- 143 S. Meridian Ave. Valley Center, Kansas, 67147; United States
- Coordinates: 37.8311°N 97.3726°W

District information
- Type: Public
- Grades: Pre-K to 12
- Schools: 7

Other information
- Website: usd262.net

Valley Center USD 262 is a public unified school district headquartered in Valley Center, Kansas, United States. The district includes the communities of Valley Center, Park City, Sunnydale, and nearby rural areas.

== Schools ==
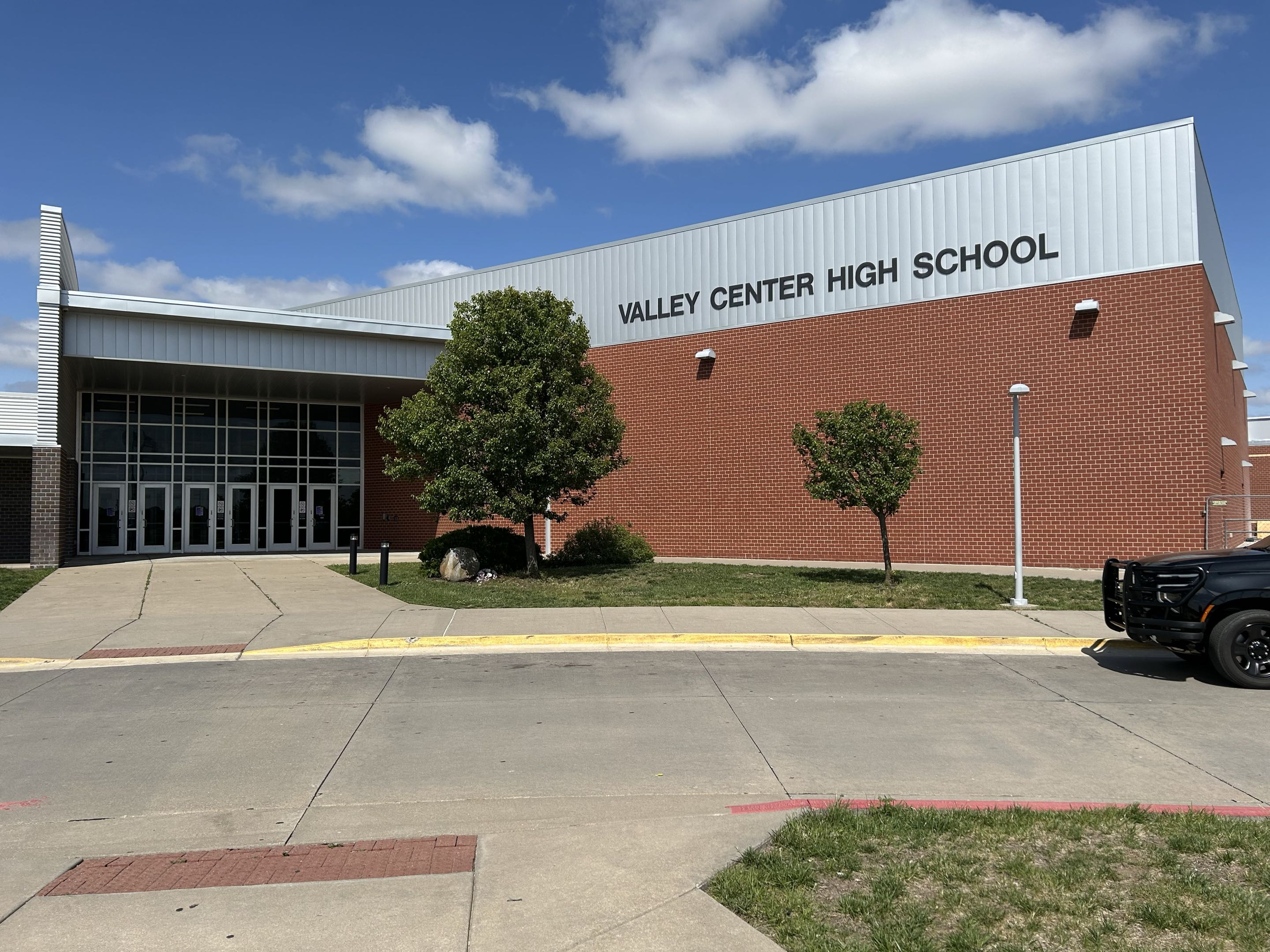
Valley Center High School (2026)

The school district operates the following schools:

- Valley Center High School
- Valley Center Middle School
- Valley Center Intermediate School
- Abilene Elementary School
- West Elementary School
- Wheatland Elementary School
- Valley Park Elementary School (Will open for the 2026-2027 school year)
- Valley Center Learning Center

== Notable people ==
- Mary Easley - Oklahoma Senator (2004–2010), Oklahoma Representative (1997–2004), teacher

== See also ==
- Kansas State Department of Education
- Kansas State High School Activities Association
- List of high schools in Kansas
- List of unified school districts in Kansas
