= Norton, Missouri =

Unincorporated community in Missouri, U.S.

Coordinates: 39°11′46″N 93°08′06″W

Norton is an unincorporated community in Saline County, in the U.S. state of Missouri.

== History ==
Norton was platted in 1878, and named after Elijah Hise Norton, a judge of the Supreme Court of Missouri. A post office called Norton was established in 1879, and remained in operation until 1954.
