= Lilly, Missouri =

Extinct hamlet in Missouri, U.S.

Coordinates: 39°28′12″N 94°26′41″W

Lilly is a former hamlet in southern Clinton County, in the U.S. state of Missouri.

== History ==
A post office called Lilly was established in 1889, and remained in operation until 1905. The source of the name Lilly is uncertain.
