= Ospur, Illinois =

- Unincorporated community
- Location within Illinois Location within the United States
- Coordinates: 40°05′19″N 88°57′19″W
- Country: United States
- State: Illinois
- County: DeWitt
- Elevation: 728 ft (222 m)
- Time zone: UTC-6 (Central (CST))
  - Summer (DST): UTC-5 (CDT)
- Area code: 217
- GNIS feature ID: 423049

Ospur is an unincorporated community in DeWitt County, Illinois, United States. Ospur is 4.5 miles (7.2 km) south of Clinton.
