= Sunnydale, Kansas =

Unincorporated community in Sedgwick County, Kansas

Coordinates: 37°52′06″N 97°17′58″W

Sunnydale is an unincorporated community in Sedgwick County, Kansas, United States. It is located at Hillside St and 101st St N.

== History ==
A post office was opened in Sunnydale (also historically Sunny Dale) in 1877, and remained in operation until it was discontinued in 1901.

== Education ==
The community is served by Valley Center USD 262 public school district.
