= Middle Grove, Missouri =

Unincorporated community in Missouri, U.S.

- Census-designated place
- Location within Missouri
- Coordinates: 39°23′42″N 92°16′20″W
- Country: United States
- State: Missouri
- County: Monroe

Area
  - Total: 0.56 sq mi (1.44 km^{2})
  - Land: 0.56 sq mi (1.44 km^{2})
  - Water: 0 sq mi (0.00 km^{2})
- Elevation: 807 ft (246 m)

Population (2020)
  - Total: 57
  - Density: 102.3/sq mi (39.51/km^{2})
- Time zone: UTC-6 (Central (CST))
  - Summer (DST): UTC-5 (CDT)
- ZIP Code: 65263 (Madison)
- FIPS code: 29-47846
- GNIS feature ID: 2806416

Middle Grove is an unincorporated community and census-designated place in Monroe County, Missouri, United States. As of the 2020 census, the population was 57.

== History ==
The community was settled in 1830 and founded by John C. Milligan and Jacob Whittenburg. The community was named due to its location in the center of a rural district. A post office called Middle Grove was established in 1835, the name was changed to "Middlegrove" in 1894, and the post office closed in 1907.

In 1942, heavy rains hit the community, forcing residents onto rooftops to await help.

In 1979, Melvin Lute was stabbed and shot in his Middle Grove trailer home. His wife Shirley and son Roy were charged with the murder.

== Geography ==
Middle Grove is in southwestern Monroe County, 8 miles (13 km) southwest of Madison, 10 miles (16 km) east of Moberly, and 19 miles (31 km) southwest of Paris, the Monroe county seat.

According to the U.S. Census Bureau, the Middle Grove CDP has an area of 0.56 square miles (1.45 km^{2}), all land. Milligan Creek forms the eastern border of the community, flowing north toward the Elk Fork of the Salt River.

== Demographics ==
Historical population
Census	Pop.	Note	%±
2020	57		—
U.S. Decennial Census

Middle Grove first appeared as a census designated place in the 2020 U.S. census.

== Notable people ==
- Xenophon Overton Pindall (1873–1935), member of Arkansas House of Representatives and Arkansas State Senate; Acting Governor of Arkansas
