= Swiftwater, Mississippi =

- Unincorporated community
- Cotton fields at Swiftwater, c. 1885-1898. Photo by William Henry Jackson.

- Location within Mississippi Location within the United States
- Coordinates: 33°20′15″N 91°3′35″W
- Country: United States
- State: Mississippi
- County: Washington
- Elevation: 121 ft (37 m)
- Time zone: UTC-6 (Central (CST))
  - Summer (DST): UTC-5 (CDT)
- ZIP code: 38701
- Area code: 662
- GNIS feature ID: 692252

Swiftwater is an unincorporated community located in Washington County, Mississippi, United States.

== History ==
Swiftwater began as Swiftwater Cotton Plantation, founded by Alexander Barckly Montgomery, who built a mansion there in either 1850 or 1845. Montgomery sold the plantation to Col. Ed Richardson, the world's largest cotton plantation owner in the 1870s and 1880s, and owner of plantations across the South.

Swiftwater was a stop on the now-abandoned Yazoo and Mississippi Valley Railroad, completed in the 1880s.

Located on the rail platform was the Swiftwater Store, owned by the E.E. Richardson Company. The store was still in operation in 1910.

Swiftwater was never incorporated, but had a post office from 1886 to 1932.

== Notable people ==
Pete Shields, a professional baseball player with the Cleveland Indians, was born in Swiftwater.
