= Oil City, Missouri =

Unincorporated community in Missouri, U.S.

Coordinates: 39°20′40″N 92°50′58″W

Oil City is an unincorporated community in Chariton County, Missouri.

Oil City shows up on the Forest Green U.S. Geological Survey Map.
