= Fiscus, Iowa =

- Unincorporated community
- Location within Iowa
- Coordinates: 41°44′20″N 95°05′35″W
- Country: United States
- State: Iowa
- County: Audubon
- Elevation: 1,296 ft (395 m)
- Time zone: UTC-6 (Central (CST))
  - Summer (DST): UTC-5 (CDT)
- Area code: 712
- GNIS feature ID: 456611

Fiscus is an unincorporated community in Audubon County, Iowa, in the United States.

== History ==
A post office was established in Fiscus in 1889, and remained in operation until it was discontinued in 1903. Adam Cain Fiscus was the minister at the Fiscus Church of Christ.

Fiscus' population was 12 in 1925. The population was 30 in 1940.
