= Ryder, Missouri =

Unincorporated community in Missouri, U.S.

Coordinates: 39°18′17″N 92°26′16″W

Ryder is an unincorporated community in Randolph County, in the U.S. state of Missouri.

The community was named after one Mr. Ryder, the original owner of the town site.
