= Nashua, Kansas City =

Neighborhood of Kansas City, Missouri, U.S.

Coordinates: 39.299°N 94.573°W

Nashua is a neighborhood on the northside Kansas City, Missouri, United States in what is known as the Northland.

A post office called Nashua was established in 1890, and remained in operation until 1962. The community was named after Nashua, New Hampshire, the native home of an early settler.
