= Mount Pleasant, Missouri =

Extinct hamlet in Missouri, U.S.

Coordinates: 40°13′38″N 94°30′04″W

Mount Pleasant is an extinct hamlet in Gentry County, in the U.S. state of Missouri.

Mount Pleasant was platted in 1856. Mount Pleasant is a commendatory name. A variant name was "Ellington". A post office called Mount Pleasant was established in 1862, the name was changed to Ellington in 1879, and the post office closed in 1890. Nothing remains of the settlement.
