= Shannon, Texas =

- Unincorporated community
- Location within Texas Location within the United States
- Coordinates: 33°28′26″N 98°15′32″W
- Country: United States
- State: Texas
- County: Clay
- Elevation: 1,037 ft (316 m)
- Time zone: UTC-6 (Central (CST))
  - Summer (DST): UTC-5 (CDT)
- Area code: 940
- GNIS feature ID: 1368055

Shannon is an unincorporated community in Clay County, Texas, United States. According to the Handbook of Texas, the community had a population of 23 in 2000. It is located within the Wichita Falls metropolitan area. Shannon is named after Shannon, County Clare in Ireland.

== History ==
On May 22, 2020, an EFU tornado hit the community and traveled south to nearby Joy. Multiple storm chasers observed this tornado but no damage was found. A tornado also struck Shannon in April 1955, although there were no casualties.

== Geography ==
Shannon is located on Farm to Market Road 175, 20 mi (32 km) southwest of Henrietta and 20 mi (32 km) north of Jacksboro in extreme south-central Clay County.

== Education ==
In 1910, Shannon had a school with 82 students and two teachers. Today, Shannon is served by the Midway Independent School District.

== Notable people ==
- Riley Matheson, offensive lineman in the NFL for the San Francisco 49ers and Detroit Lions.
- Chuck Roberson, actor and stuntman.
