= Tornado outbreak of April 17–18, 2026 =

Severe weather event

- Map of tornadoes and counties placed under tornado warnings from April 17 to April 18

Meteorological history
- Date: April 17–18, 2026

Tornado outbreak
- Tornadoes: 88
- Max. rating: EF3 tornado
- Duration: 10 hours, 8 minutes
- Highest winds: Tornadic – 145 mph (233 km/h) (Ringle, Wisconsin EF3 on April 17)
- Highest gusts: Non-tornadic – 91 mph (146 km/h) in Durant, Iowa
- Largest hail: 3.25 inches (8.3 cm) in Jet, Oklahoma on April 17

Overall effects
- Fatalities: 0
- Injuries: 4
- Areas affected: Central and Midwestern United States
- Part of the Tornadoes of 2026

A major tornado outbreak took place between April 17 and 18, 2026, within the Midwestern United States, Upper Midwest, and the Southern Plains. The Storm Prediction Center forecasted a wind and hail-driven moderate risk for severe weather on April 17, covering portions of northern Oklahoma, central and eastern portions of Kansas, and western Missouri, with a risk for very large to giant hail, extreme damaging winds, and strong to intense tornadoes. Throughout the afternoon and evening hours, multiple tornadoes touched down in and around the risk area. Multiple houses were damaged and two people were injured by a high-end EF2 tornado that tracked through southern portions of Rochester, Minnesota. The town of Lena, Illinois was struck by a large high-end EF2 tornado inflicting significant damage. A low-end EF3 tornado tracked through areas near Cream, Wisconsin, causing significant damage to a home by removing most of its exterior walls and destroying several outbuildings. Another EF3 tornado struck portions of Ringle, Wisconsin, damaging and destroying around 75 homes and minorly damaging a school. Tornadoes in the Bloomington–Normal area heavily delayed two Amtrak trains as well.

Overall, 88 tornadoes have been confirmed during the outbreak.

== Meteorological synopsis ==
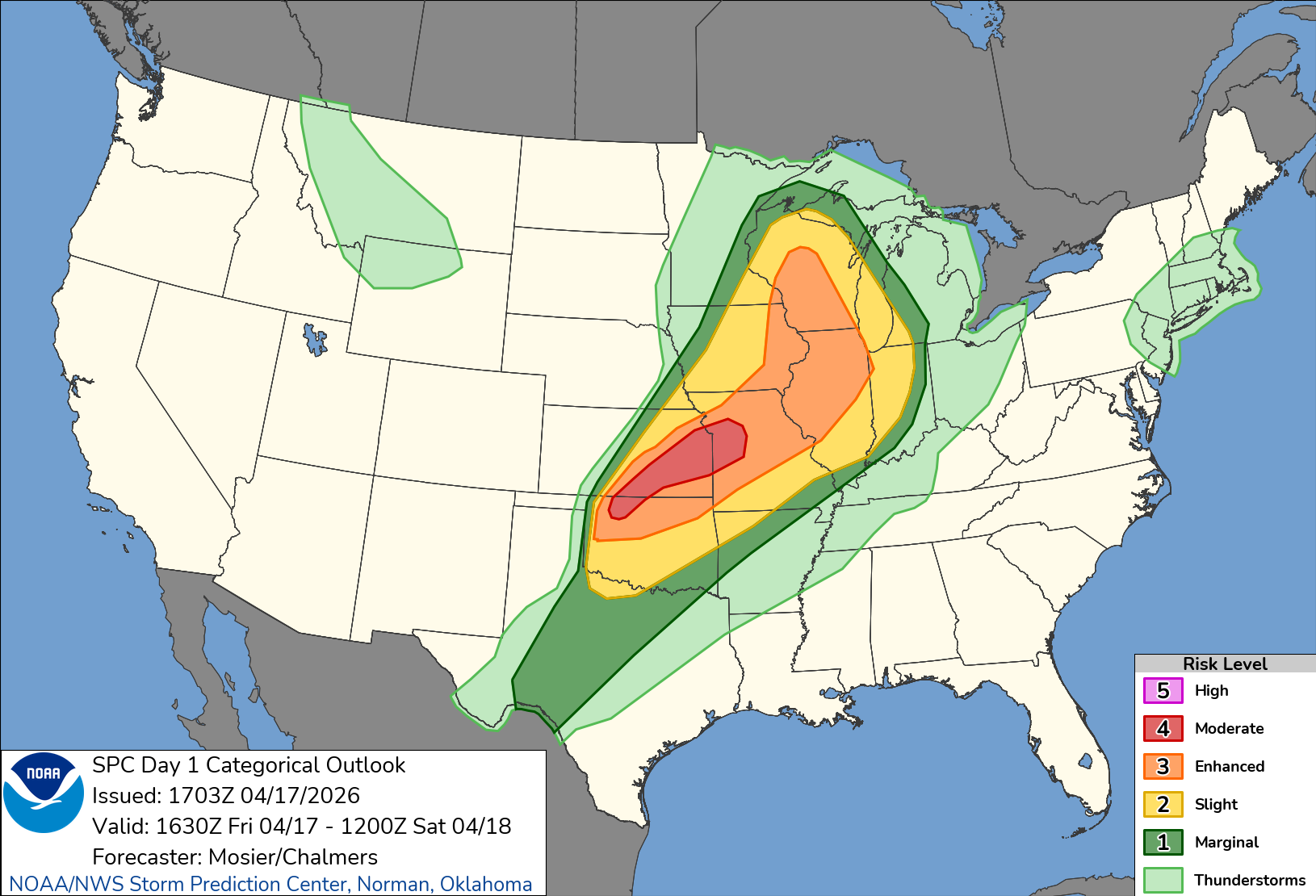
The Storm Prediction Center's 1630 UTC Day 1 Convective Outlook for April 17, 2026.

Despite there being several rounds of thunderstorms in the day before this, a very unstable air mass was present over the Midwest extending down into Oklahoma. On April 15, 2026, the Storm Prediction Center outlined a Day 3 enhanced risk for much of Kansas, Iowa, Oklahoma, and Missouri, along with smaller portions of Illinois and Wisconsin, with all severe hazards considered possible. The following day, the enhanced risk was maintained, with the primary corridor for tornadic potential being located in southwestern Wisconsin, along with small parts of northeastern Iowa and southeastern Minnesota. This was driven by a CIG1 hatched 10% risk for tornadoes, later updated with a CIG2 hatched area being added in this update, with EF3+ tornadoes possible. This outlook was maintained into the next morning.

The next afternoon at the 1630 UTC Day 1 update, the SPC issued a Level 4/Moderate risk for severe weather in parts of Oklahoma, Kansas, and Missouri. Across the whole Enhanced risk area a very unstable air mass was present, extending from the Midwest down into Oklahoma, with dew points in the low 60's in Minnesota to the low 70's °F in Oklahoma and MLCAPE values reaching 3000 J/kg over Kansas into Iowa. In the Midwest, storms were expected to initially become supercells along a cold front and sweep east across Iowa, Minnesota and Wisconsin. As the sun set, the storms would merge into a squall line with a threat for damaging winds with brief tornadoes also likely across Illinois. Further south in the Moderate risk, supercells were expected to fire along a dry line near a triple point in Kansas and Oklahoma, but tornadoes were seen as less likely as winds were parallel throughout the atmosphere. However, giant hail (3-3.5" in diameter) and damaging winds up to 90 mph was still seen as likely.

A NEXRAD radar loop of the tornado outbreak.

Around 2 pm CDT, storms initiated along the entire line, roughly along I-35, with two Tornado watches being issued. However, a pair of supercells formed well ahead of the line in IA/IL/WI border in an environment marked with 100-200 m^2/s^2 of storm relative helicity (SRH) and produced multiple strong tornadoes in northern Illinois and Wisconsin, including an EF2 tornado near Lena, Illinois around 3:30 pm CDT and an EF1 tornado near Janesville, Wisconsin later after 5 pm CDT. Further north in Wisconsin, another cluster of supercells ahead of the line produced an EF3 tornado near Wausau, heavily damaging several homes. Along the main line, storms struggled to turn tornadic in Iowa, but over Minnesota a supercell was able to produce multiple EF2 tornadoes around Rochester and an EF3 tornado just across the Wisconsin border. Tornado activity across Iowa remained fairly limited with only four weak tornadoes confirmed despite the favorable environment, though large hail was common. In Kansas, another supercell also formed ahead of the front, but was unable to produce a tornado in the relatively unfavorable environment.

Around and after sunset, the line in Iowa began to congeal into a squall line and produce widespread damaging winds. Although MLCAPE values were lower, around 1500 J/kg, SRH values were increasing from around 200 to 450 m^2/s^2 thanks to the strengthening of the nocturnal low-level jet, and mesovortices formed along the line causing widespread tornadic activity. Over two dozen tornadoes struck Central Illinois, with multiple tornado warnings being issued, including for the National Weather Service office in Lincoln. Two EF2 tornadoes formed around 7:30 pm CDT around Table Grove and caused extensive tree damage. At 7:50 pm CDT, the first of two 30+ mile EF1 tornadoes touched town near Bluff City along the Illinois River and tracked nearly 37 miles, dissipating near San Jose. This mesovorticy went on to produce another EF2 tornado and an EF1 tornado that formed at 8:57 pm CDT and hit Normal while at the same time another EF1 tornado tracked through Bloomington. At that same time, the second 30+ mile EF1 tornado touched down south of Bloomington eventually impacting the city of Downs. Tornadoes continued eastward, but began to taper off as the squall line weakened. The last EF2 tornado touched down at 10:14 pm CDT and past south of Sheldon, snapping power poles as their base.

Further south along the line over Kansas and Oklahoma, storms did turn severe, but most failed to turn tornadic in the unfavorable conditions, though a couple still did occur. The supercells that formed in Kansas crossed over into Missouri and entered a more favorable environment and produced multiple weak tornadoes across the central part of the state.

== Confirmed tornadoes ==
Confirmed tornadoes by Enhanced Fujita rating
EFU	EF0	EF1	EF2	EF3	EF4	EF5	Total
5	22	52	7	2	0	0	88

=== April 17 event ===
List of confirmed tornadoes – Friday, April 17, 2026 (Note: All dates are based on the local time zone where the tornado touched down; however, all times are in Coordinated Universal Time for consistency.)
EF#	Location	County / Parish	State	Start Coord.	Time (UTC)	Path length	Max width
EF0	NNE of Sargeant to SSE of Oslo	Mower, Dodge	MN	43.8468°N 92.7803°W	18:46–18:57	2.8 mi (4.5 km)	110 yd (100 m)
EF0	A grain silo had minor damage.						
EF0	SSE of Oslo to S of Rock Dell	Dodge, Olmsted	MN	43.8596°N 92.7193°W	18:55–19:07	4.85 mi (7.81 km)	150 yd (140 m)
EF0	A few farm buildings and trees sustained light damage.						
EFU	N of Nashville to WSW of Fulton	Jackson	IA	42.127°N 90.7807°W	19:15–19:19	1.02 mi (1.64 km)	10 yd (9.1 m)
EFU	Storm spotters and storm chasers reported a tornado. No damage was noted.						
EF2	Northern Stewartville to southeastern Rochester	Olmsted	MN	43.8722°N 92.4826°W	19:19–19:36	9.71 mi (15.63 km)	250 yd (230 m)
EF2	This strong, high-end EF2 tornado formed in northern Stewartville and traveled northeast, damaging numerous homes and farmsteads along its path. The most significant damage occurred near US 52, where homes sustained severe impacts including roof removal and partially collapsed exterior walls. The tornado then lifted shortly after causing this damage. Three people were injured.						
EFU	N of Parkersburg	Butler	IA	42.62°N 92.78°W	19:32–19:36	1.59 mi (2.56 km)	10 yd (9.1 m)
EFU	An EFU tornado was confirmed by NWS Des Moines. Preliminary information.						
EF1	Northeastern Rochester to NNW of Elgin	Olmsted, Wabasha	MN	44.0426°N 92.4102°W	19:33–19:55	12.36 mi (19.89 km)	200 yd (180 m)
EF1	Minor damage to shingles occurred as the tornado touched down in northeastern Rochester. It then moved through rural areas, causing sporadic damage to farm outbuildings and trees.						
EF2	E of Viola to ESE of Plainview	Olmsted, Wabasha	MN	44.0689°N 92.2182°W	19:47–20:03	7.43 mi (11.96 km)	200 yd (180 m)
EF2	A significant tornado damaged trees and outbuildings. One home lost its roof and portions of its garage roof.						
EF0	WNW of Saratoga to S of Chester	Howard	IA	43.3779°N 92.431°W	19:47–19:54	4.2 mi (6.8 km)	60 yd (55 m)
EF0	An outbuilding was damaged and a truck was rolled, injuring the driver.						
EF1	ESE of The Galena Territory to SW of Schapville	Jo Daviess	IL	42.3913°N 90.2979°W	19:47–19:54	3.7 mi (6.0 km)	100 yd (91 m)
EF1	This tornado damaged the awning of a house and sporadic tree damage.						
EFU	NE of Potter	Atchison	KS	39.4628°N 95.1043°W	20:08	0.02 mi (0.032 km)	
EFU	A storm chaser observed a brief tornado.						
EF3	S of Cream to N of Montana	Buffalo	WI	44.2843°N 91.7737°W	20:26–20:46	10.35 mi (16.66 km)	300 yd (270 m)
EF3	This intense tornado formed near Cream and tracked northeast over primarily forested terrain, causing widespread damage to trees and farm outbuildings as it intensified along its path. Near WIS 88, it produced its most significant damage by removing the roof and many exterior walls of a well-built home while numerous trees were snapped or uprooted in the surrounding area. The tornado then continued northeast, causing additional tree and structural damage before dissipating just to the north of Montana.						
EF2	NE of Kent to Lena to SW of Orangeville	Stephenson	IL	42.3547°N 89.8738°W	20:36–21:03	12.54 mi (20.18 km)	1,250 yd (1,140 m)
EF2	This large tornado first touched down along US 20 southwest of Lena first causing EF1 damage to trees. The tornado tracked northeastward, snapping and uprooting more trees and destroying power poles at EF2 intensity, as captured on a camera in Lena, wrapped in rain. The tornado then turned due east, moving directly into town, where it caused widespread and significant EF2 roof damage. A lot of houses had shingle and siding damage, while trees in the area were snapped or uprooted at EF2 intensity. The tornado then reached peak strength as it caused severe damage, where three houses lost their entire roof structure, and two other homes experienced partial exterior wall collapse. The tornado then turned back to the northeast, causing additional damage to farm structures and extensive tree damage before weakening and dissipating. The entire town was left without power.						
EF1	Olivet	Osage	KS	38.4791°N 95.7608°W	21:07–21:09	1.08 mi (1.74 km)	75 yd (69 m)
EF1	A tornado moved through Olivet, severely damaging several outbuildings. Metal siding, framing, and roofing debris were lofted several hundred yards to the northeast of the town.						
EF1	N of Blair	Trempealeau	WI	44.2947°N 91.2958°W	21:09–21:17	5.58 mi (8.98 km)	90 yd (82 m)
EF1	This high-end EF1 tornado snapped or uprooted hundreds of trees across rural areas.						
EFU	SE of Postville	Clayton	IA	43.0569°N 91.5319°W	21:17–21:18	0.57 mi (0.92 km)	20 yd (18 m)
EFU	A storm chaser recorded a brief tornado. No damage occurred.						
EF1	SE of Osseo to W of Price	Trempealeau, Jackson	WI	44.5493°N 91.1703°W	21:20–21:29	4.82 mi (7.76 km)	130 yd (120 m)
EF1	A tornado tracked through forested terrain and caused extensive damage to large swaths of trees throughout its path.						
EFU	N of Pecatonica	Winnebago	IL	42.3512°N 89.3571°W	21:35–21:37	0.69 mi (1.11 km)	50 yd (46 m)
EFU	A storm chaser documented a brief tornado in an open field.						
EF1	WNW of Glandon to S of Doering	Marathon, Lincoln	WI	45.1036°N 89.4805°W	21:44–21:55	4.33 mi (6.97 km)	100 yd (91 m)
EF1	This tornado developed near Glandon and caused significant damage to farm structures, including collapsing part of a barn, pushing a silo off its foundation, and tearing most of the roof and some walls from a metal outbuilding. As it moved north-northeast, it crossed WIS 64, downing trees and causing additional damage to garages and outbuildings. The tornado continued to produce tree and structural damage before weakening and dissipating.						
EF3	E of Kronenwetter to S of Johnson	Marathon	WI	44.8414°N 89.5661°W	21:46–22:03	13.53 mi (21.77 km)	600 yd (550 m)
EF3	See section on tornado						
EF1	S of Hatfield	Jackson	WI	44.3922°N 90.762°W	21:52–21:56	2.34 mi (3.77 km)	150 yd (140 m)
EF1	A tornado developed on the banks of the Black River, causing extensive tree damage and minor damage to a home, before dissipating near the railroad tracks to the southeast of town.						
EF1	SSE of Harrison to SW of Rockton	Winnebago	IL	42.3942°N 89.1782°W	21:57–22:07	3.95 mi (6.36 km)	400 yd (370 m)
EF1	A tornado damaged farmsteads, destroyed outbuildings, and snapped or uprooted multiple trees. It reached peak intensity at a residence where most of the roof of a two-story home was removed, an old barn was destroyed, and additional trees were snapped. The tornado then turned sharply southward, weakened, and dissipated in an open field.						
EF1	E of West Chester to SSE of Richmond	Washington	IA	41.3496°N 91.7455°W	22:02–22:10	5.34 mi (8.59 km)	100 yd (91 m)
EF1	This tornado snapped numerous power poles and trees. Some farm outbuildings had their sheet metal roofs ripped off and a semi-truck was tipped over.						
EF1	Belton to Raymore	Cass	MO	38.7972°N 94.5402°W	22:19–22:29	4.81 mi (7.74 km)	100 yd (91 m)
EF1	This high-end EF1 tornado began on the south side of Belton and moved northeast through the city, damaging homes and trees through a neighborhood and across a cemetery. It then struck another neighborhood south of Route 58, producing additional structural and tree damage before weakening to more sporadic impacts. The tornado continued east-northeast, crossing I-49 and damaging the roofs of several homes in Raymore before lifting.						
EF1	SSE of Janesville	Rock	WI	42.6062°N 88.9434°W	23:02–23:05	1.89 mi (3.04 km)	75 yd (69 m)
EF1	A shed was damaged and multiple trees were snapped or uprooted.						
EF1	Emerald Grove	Rock	WI	42.6494°N 88.9028°W	23:05–23:10	2.06 mi (3.32 km)	100 yd (91 m)
EF1	This tornado tracked through Emerald Grove, destroying a barn and damaging an antique shop. Significant tree damage occurred as well.						
EF1	S of Johnstown Center to NNE of Fairfield	Rock, Walworth	WI	42.6732°N 88.8419°W	23:15–23:21	4.37 mi (7.03 km)	75 yd (69 m)
EF1	A multi-vortex tornado damaged multiple sheds.						
EF1	N of Darien to western Delavan	Walworth	WI	42.6362°N 88.7222°W	23:39–23:46	2.81 mi (4.52 km)	75 yd (69 m)
EF1	This tornado caused damage at four farmsteads, one of which had an empty silo's top half collapse. Multiple trees were damaged as well.						
EF0	Viola	Mercer	IL	41.198°N 90.5953°W	23:40–23:42	0.95 mi (1.53 km)	50 yd (46 m)
EF0	This tornado caused mainly tree damage by uprooting, snapping, and shearing treetops, while also producing minor structural damage including uplifting half of a home's roof and damaging the brick facade of a business.						
EF1	N of Delavan	Walworth	WI	42.6509°N 88.6897°W	23:43–23:46	2.71 mi (4.36 km)	75 yd (69 m)
EF1	This tornado touched down on the banks of the Turtle Creek and tracked east-northeast. It destroyed a barn shed and damaged three barns, a garage, and a house before lifting.						
EF1	NE of West Point to Denver to SE of Bentley	Hancock	IL	40.2718°N 91.1602°W	23:55–00:03	5.67 mi (9.12 km)	150 yd (140 m)
EF1	A tornado developed southwest of Denver and tracked through town, snapping numerous trees and causing widespread damage to utility poles, with dozens broken or bent along its path. Structural damage also occurred, primarily to facades, windows, and roofs of homes and businesses.						
EF1	Southern Ponca City to McCord to SW of Apperson	Kay, Osage	OK	36.683°N 97.153°W	23:55–00:19	19.6 mi (31.5 km)	1,200 yd (1,100 m)
EF1	This tornado formed west-southwest of Ponca City and moved generally eastward across Business US 60 and parallel to US 60/US 177, causing sporadic EF0 tree and power pole damage on the south side of the town. After crossing US 77/Business US 60, the tornado intensified to EF1 strength as it crossed the Arkansas River into Osage County and struck McCord, uprooting or snapping numerous trees, damaging homes, and blowing down power poles. The tornado then paralleled the Arkansas River before crossing back over it into Kay County briefly. It then crossed the river again back into Osage County south of the Kaw Lake dam, uprooting and snapping numerous trees and damaging homes. The tornado then continued east-northeastward over open terrain before dissipating.						
EF1	E of Harrison to Roscoe	Winnebago	IL	42.4195°N 89.1533°W	00:03–00:17	10.88 mi (17.51 km)	350 yd (320 m)
EF1	A tornado touched down and immediately inflicted tree damage. It continued east before reaching peak intensity in residential subdivisions where multiple homes sustained roof, siding, and fascia damage, garage doors were blown in, and numerous trees were uprooted or damaged. It continued eastward into Roscoe, knocking down power poles and damaging a farm outbuilding before crossing the Rock River, where it produced more extensive tree damage and additional minor to moderate damage to homes. The tornado then dissipated near the Winnebago-Boone county line.						
EF1	SSE of Erie	Henry	IL	41.5688°N 90.052°W	00:04–00:07	0.25 mi (0.40 km)	50 yd (46 m)
EF1	This brief tornado impacted a farmstead, damaging a few outbuildings and causing minor tree damage.						
EF1	E of Ponca City	Kay, Osage	OK	36.709°N 96.936°W	00:11–00:14	1.17 mi (1.88 km)	75 yd (69 m)
EF1	This brief tornado damaged boat shelters at the Hidaway Marina in McFadden Cove just northwest of the Kaw Lake dam. The tornado then crossed into Osage County, uprooting a few trees before dissipating.						
EF1	E of Middle Creek to ENE of Colmar	Hancock, McDonough	IL	40.3701°N 90.9554°W	00:13–00:21	6 mi (9.7 km)	75 yd (69 m)
EF1	This tornado damaged several outbuildings, including one that was destroyed. Multiple power poles were snapped or nearly blown over and numerous trees were snapped or uprooted.						
EF1	SE of Centerville to Toulon	Knox, Stark	IL	41.0427°N 90.0288°W	00:15–00:27	10.27 mi (16.53 km)	
EF1	A tornado touched down, causing damage to large tree limbs and power poles before moving northeast and crossing into Stark County. The tornado caused damage to shingles and siding and inflicted significant damage to a large outbuilding with portions of its metal roof removed. It continued producing intermittent tree damage and minor impacts to additional homes before entering Toulon, where it damaged an outbuilding, carport, and electrical poles. It then uprooted large trees and caused further roof and siding damage to homes. As the tornado exited town, it lifted over an open field.						
EF1	Northern Warsaw	Benton	MO	38.21°N 93.45°W	00:19–00:26	6.41 mi (10.32 km)	200 yd (180 m)
EF1	This tornado shattered windows at the Warsaw visitor center, inflicted roof damage to businesses, overturned and destroyed mobile homes at a storage facility, and damaged, snapped, or uprooted trees.						
EF0	ENE of Spring Prairie to W of Burlington	Walworth	WI	42.6982°N 88.3661°W	00:22–00:25	1.81 mi (2.91 km)	50 yd (46 m)
EF0	An intermittent tornado peeled two roofs, damaged siding on a garage, snapped several tree limbs and uprooted a few trees.						
EF0	Southern White Branch	Benton	MO	38.23°N 93.35°W	00:23–00:24	0.54 mi (0.87 km)	200 yd (180 m)
EF0	A metal building system was damaged along with several trees.						
EF1	S of White Branch	Benton	MO	38.22°N 93.35°W	00:25–00:27	1.61 mi (2.59 km)	150 yd (140 m)
EF1	This tornado damaged the roofing of an add-on building of the Warsaw High School and downed numerous trees.						
EF2	NE of Industry to WNW of Bernadotte	McDonough, Fulton	IL	40.364°N 90.5625°W	00:29–00:44	12.82 mi (20.63 km)	200 yd (180 m)
EF2	This low-end EF2 tornado began northeast of Industry and moved eastward, snapping power poles and damaging trees and outbuildings. The tornado then turned sharply northeastward as it approached Fulton County, ripping half the roof off a home and snapping trees. The tornado then reached its peak intensity along the county line, snapping trees, obliterating a newer wood machine shed, destroying a newer grain bin, and causing roof, siding, and exterior wall damage to homes. Debris from the destroyed structures was thrown up to a 1/2 mi (0.80 km) to the northeast. The tornado then crossed US 136 northwest of Table Grove and gradually turned back to the east-northeast, damaging, uprooting, and snapping numerous trees before being absorbed by the 0040 UTC EF2 tornado below.						
EF0	S of Caldwell to W of Tichigan	Racine	WI	42.8096°N 88.2781°W	00:32–00:36	1.42 mi (2.29 km)	50 yd (46 m)
EF0	A trees and tree branches were downed. A port-a-potty was also displaced.						
EF2	E of Table Grove to Bryant	Fulton	IL	40.369°N 90.3904°W	00:40–01:01	18.12 mi (29.16 km)	500 yd (460 m)
EF2	This tornado immediately reached its peak intensity of high-end EF2 right after it formed, snapping and shredding trees. The tornado then turned northeastward and absorbed the 0029 UTC EF2 tornado before turning back to the east-northeast, producing tree damage primarily with numerous trees uprooted and snapped. The tornado then moved through Bryant, causing a few roofs of outbuildings to be damaged before lifting just north of town.						
EF0	SSE of Stover to WNW of Gravois Mills	Morgan	MO	38.3402°N 92.9622°W	00:44–00:47	1.29 mi (2.08 km)	100 yd (91 m)
EF0	A barn and other outbuildings were damaged. Numerous trees were uprooted along with numerous large tree limbs downed.						
EF1	N of Gravois Mills	Morgan	MO	38.3°N 92.9°W	00:46–00:53	7.26 mi (11.68 km)	300 yd (270 m)
EF1	Several trees were uprooted, two outbuildings were damaged and a home had some of its windows broken.						
EF1	Bluff City to Bath to San Jose	Schuyler, Fulton, Mason, Logan	IL	40.178°N 90.246°W	00:50–01:26	36.71 mi (59.08 km)	
EF1	This long-track tornado touched down and immediately moved into Bluff City, snapping trees and destroying an outbuilding. It then crossed the Illinois River into Bath where some structural damage occurred, including collapsed walls. The tornado continued producing widespread damage by overturning irrigation pivots, snapping numerous trees, and destroying grain bins near IL 97. As it progressed through and beyond Biggs, tree damage remained extensive, with some of the most notable impacts occurring in San Jose where several large trees were snapped before the tornado lifted.						
EF0	Southern Muskego	Waukesha	WI	42.8548°N 88.1492°W	00:52–00:55	0.62 mi (1.00 km)	10 yd (9.1 m)
EF0	A few trees were snapped, and several large tree limbs were downed.						
EF0	W of Raymond to WNW of Kneeland	Racine	WI	42.7898°N 88.0732°W	00:55–01:00	3.45 mi (5.55 km)	50 yd (46 m)
EF0	This tornado damaged a few outbuildings and broke tree branches.						
EF1	Northern Raymond to Oak Creek	Racine, Milwaukee	WI	42.8151°N 88.0808°W	00:56–01:05	5.2 mi (8.4 km)	75 yd (69 m)
EF1	Outbuildings and trees were damaged.						
EF0	N of Barnett	Morgan	MO	38.3865°N 92.693°W	00:59–01:01	1.28 mi (2.06 km)	150 yd (140 m)
EF0	This weak tornado lofted tree debris and bent metal rods for a hay bale shelter.						
EF0	SSE of Marion to Hartsburg	Cole, Boone	MO	38.658°N 92.355°W	01:08–01:12	3.52 mi (5.66 km)	50 yd (46 m)
EF0	A tornado snapped tree branches.						
EF1	N of Forest City to southern Manito to WNW of Dillon	Mason, Tazewell	IL	40.3835°N 89.8375°W	01:11–01:29	15.37 mi (24.74 km)	200 yd (180 m)
EF1	A tornado began just north of Forest City, producing substantial tree damage before moving northeast and damaging a small outbuilding. As it tracked into Manito, it snapped and uprooted trees, downed power lines, and peeled the roof off another outbuilding. The tornado then moved into Tazewell County where it caused additional tree damage and tipped an irrigation system. It continued across the Mackinaw River where tree damage was observed on both of the river banks. Sporadic damage continued until the tornado finally dissipated after leaning a few power poles.						
EF1	E of Arlington to NW of Earlville	Bureau, LaSalle	IL	41.4646°N 89.2054°W	01:12–01:32	17.62 mi (28.36 km)	300 yd (270 m)
EF1	A tornado began in rural Bureau County where it caused roof damage to a barn before moving northeast and producing additional damage to trees and farm outbuildings. As it continued, several wooden power poles were damaged and a semi-truck was blown over on I-39. The tornado then caused further tree and outbuilding damage near Meriden before weakening and dissipating in an open field north of US 34.						
EF1	SE of Kingston Mines to southern Pekin	Tazewell	IL	40.5337°N 89.7403°W	01:22–01:29	6.33 mi (10.19 km)	100 yd (91 m)
EF1	This tornado began and tracked along the southern shores of Powerton Lake, causing minor damage to trees. As it moved into southern Pekin, an industrial building sustained some roof damage and several tree trunks were snapped. The tornado then lifted over Meyers Lake.						
EF1	ENE of Greenview to Middletown	Menard, Logan	IL	40.1048°N 89.6964°W	01:26–01:32	5.88 mi (9.46 km)	300 yd (270 m)
EF1	Several trees were damaged, some of which were snapped.						
EF1	North Pekin to Marquette Heights	Tazewell	IL	40.6116°N 89.6177°W	01:27–01:30	2.31 mi (3.72 km)	70 yd (64 m)
EF1	A tornado moved through North Pekin and Marquette Heights, causing mainly tree damage but also damaging a few homes.						
EF1	NE of South Pekin to NW of Dillon	Tazewell	IL	40.5094°N 89.6247°W	01:27–01:29	2.32 mi (3.73 km)	
EF1	Several trees were snapped in a subdivision.						
EF1	SE of Delavan	Tazewell	IL	40.5003°N 89.0673°W	01:29–01:33	10.49 mi (16.88 km)	1,100 yd (1,000 m)
EF1	A tornado touched down south of Delavan and moved northeast, causing damage to farm structures including tearing part of the roof off a pig barn and tossing it into a nearby field, blowing in barn doors, and destroying a large machine building. It remained mostly over open fields as it continued, producing localized structural damage before dissipating shortly before reaching I-155.						
EF0	NE of Carrington to W of Fulton	Callaway	MO	38.8262°N 92.0315°W	01:31–01:34	2.27 mi (3.65 km)	50 yd (46 m)
EF0	This weak tornado snapped tree branches and damaged the roof of a building at the Fulton-Elton Hensley Memorial Airport.						
EF2	NE of Emden to SE of Hopedale	Tazewell	IL	40.3475°N 89.4297°W	01:34–01:38	4.03 mi (6.49 km)	1,000 yd (910 m)
EF2	This strong tornado started just outside of Boynton where it struck a farmstead, completely destroying a machine shed and snapped an evergreen. A 2x4 from the machine shed was driven into the house on the farmstead. The tornado continued northeast, snapping trees and damaging the roof of a pig barn before it lifted.						
EF0	Morton to S of Deer Creek	Tazewell, Woodford	IL	40.623°N 89.4832°W	01:36–01:45	8.41 mi (13.53 km)	60 yd (55 m)
EF0	This high-end EF0 tornado touched down in northwestern Morton and damaged the roofs of a few warehouses around I-74. The tornado caused more roof damage to businesses in northern Morton and also snapped a power pole. The tornado almost paralleled I-74 and US 150, producing some minor tree damage before dissipating just after crossing US 150 and moving into Woodford County.						
EF1	N of Lowpoint	Woodford	IL	40.8944°N 89.3274°W	01:36–01:37	0.52 mi (0.84 km)	80 yd (73 m)
EF1	A well-built outbuilding was completely destroyed and another building sustained significant roofing damage.						
EF1	E of Tremont to Mackinaw to SSW of Congerville	Tazewell, McLean	IL	40.5249°N 89.4266°W	01:37–01:51	10.66 mi (17.16 km)	300 yd (270 m)
EF1	Several trees were damaged, a few homes had their siding damaged, and three large power poles were snapped.						
EF1	S of Minier to western Stanford to SE of Danvers	Tazewell, McLean	IL	40.4036°N 89.3252°W	01:41–01:53	12.42 mi (19.99 km)	300 yd (270 m)
EF1	This tornado caused damage to trees and farm outbuildings, one of which was destroyed.						
EF1	N of Armington to S of Minier	Tazewell	IL	40.3788°N 89.3207°W	01:42–01:43	1 mi (1.6 km)	200 yd (180 m)
EF1	Minor tree damage occurred and a portion of a machine shed's roof was blown off.						
EF2	E of Mackinaw to WNW of Danvers	Tazewell, McLean	IL	40.5389°N 89.2754°W	01:48–01:50	2.01 mi (3.23 km)	300 yd (270 m)
EF2	This strong tornado snapped seven large power poles and damaged several outbuildings. A large grain bin was tossed several hundred yards. Tree damage also occurred.						
EF1	SE of Funks Grove to Ellsworth to SE of Anchor	McLean	IL	40.3409°N 89.0736°W	01:54–02:27	33.82 mi (54.43 km)	150 yd (140 m)
EF1	This long-tracked tornado primarily damaged trees with some homes in the southern part of Downs suffering minor damage.						
EF1	Normal to Towanda	McLean	IL	40.4934°N 89.0803°W	01:56–02:06	11.31 mi (18.20 km)	900 yd (820 m)
EF1	This high-end EF1 tornado touched down west of Normal and moved into the western portions of the city, damaging several metal buildings before moving northeast and causing significant tree damage across parts of the city, including on the Illinois State University campus. It continued damaging trees as it moved out of town and flipped a semi-truck on I-55. The tornado then entered Towanda, where it caused minor damage before dissipating on the northeastern side of town.						
EF1	Bloomington to ESE of Lexington	McLean	IL	40.448°N 89.0203°W	01:57–02:18	20.87 mi (33.59 km)	600 yd (550 m)
EF1	A high-end EF1 tornado developed I-55 and initially damaged a few greenhouses before moving northeast along Veterans Parkway, where it caused primarily tree damage through multiple golf courses and nearby areas. It then intensified slightly as it moved into residential sections, snapping trees and breaking several power poles on the eastern side of Bloomington. After exiting the city, the tornado caused additional impacts including snapped trees, damage to outbuildings, minor roof and soffit damage to a home, and more power pole damage. Near the end of its track, it damaged the roofs and doors of outbuildings and snapped another power pole and tree before lifting.						
EF1	SW of Chestnut	Logan	IL	40.0355°N 89.2242°W	01:57–02:01	1.65 mi (2.66 km)	50 yd (46 m)
EF1	A power pole was damaged.						
EF1	Rowell to SE of Ospur	DeWitt	IL	40.072°N 89.043°W	02:09–02:16	6.97 mi (11.22 km)	100 yd (91 m)
EF1	A tornado touched down in a rural area, damaging two farm outbuildings and a tree before. As it moved eastward, it snapped a power pole and the top of tree, throwing the latter 300 yards (270 m) to the east. It then crossed US 51 and caused additional minor damage to another outbuilding and tree before dissipating.						
EF1	Lexington	McLean	IL	40.6422°N 88.7897°W	02:15–02:16	0.34 mi (0.55 km)	25 yd (23 m)
EF1	Power poles and trees were snapped in Lexington. One home received minor roof damage.						
EF1	E of Pleasant Hill to SSW of Fairbury	McLean, Livingston	IL	40.6132°N 88.6758°W	02:19–02:27	7.9 mi (12.7 km)	50 yd (46 m)
EF1	A machine shed, power poles, power lines, and many trees were damaged.						
EF0	Saybrook to W of Derby	McLean	IL	40.4267°N 88.5448°W	02:24–02:27	3.2 mi (5.1 km)	75 yd (69 m)
EF0	Several trees were downed and multiple tree branches were broken in Saybrook.						
EF1	SSE of Pinckney	Franklin, Warren	MO	38.6455°N 91.2502°W	02:29–02:34	3.46 mi (5.57 km)	30 yd (27 m)
EF1	Multiple trees were uprooted.						
EF0	WNW of Dundee	Franklin, Warren	MO	38.5896°N 91.1543°W	02:32–02:34	1.71 mi (2.75 km)	25 yd (23 m)
EF0	A high-end EF0 tornado uprooted trees and downed tree branches.						
EF1	W of Gibson City to WNW of Elliott	Ford	IL	40.4648°N 88.3989°W	02:32–02:37	4.85 mi (7.81 km)	100 yd (91 m)
EF1	A tornado moved through Gibson City and caused significant roof damage to multiple buildings. The tornado exited the city, producing primarily tree damage before lifting in a field.						
EF1	N of Monticello	Piatt	IL	40.0767°N 88.6155°W	02:38–02:40	2.36 mi (3.80 km)	200 yd (180 m)
EF1	A concrete grain silo was collapsed and a machine shed was heavily damaged.						
EF1	SSW of Troy	Lincoln	MO	38.9254°N 91.0465°W	02:43–02:48	3.72 mi (5.99 km)	30 yd (27 m)
EF1	A tornado snapped a few trees and uprooted others.						
EF1	WNW of Loda to E of Buckley	Ford, Iroquois	IL	40.5326°N 88.1643°W	02:46–02:55	8.99 mi (14.47 km)	150 yd (140 m)
EF1	This tornado touched, immediately collapsing two empty grain bins before moving east-northeast and causing tree damage with numerous downed and uprooted trees, while also blowing over semi-trucks on Interstate 57. Near the end of its path, it removed the roof of a large outbuilding and snapped nearby trees at their base before lifting.						
EF0	E of Seymour to W of Bondville	Champaign	IL	40.1113°N 88.4081°W	02:51	0.88 mi (1.42 km)	50 yd (46 m)
EF0	A power pole and some trees were damaged.						
EF0	Woodland to SE of Watseka	Iroquois	IL	40.7138°N 88.7262°W	03:11–03:14	2.94 mi (4.73 km)	50 yd (46 m)
EF0	Trees and outbuildings were damaged.						
EF1	ESE of Woodland, IL to W of Kentland, IN	Iroquois (IL), Newton (IN)	IL, IN	40.6807°N 87.6762°W	03:14–03:25	11.43 mi (18.39 km)	125 yd (114 m)
EF1	This strong tornado struck multiple farms as it moved northeastward, damaging buildings and trees. It peaked in intensity as it crossed the state line, snapping over a dozen new wooden power poles. The tornado dissipated shortly after crossing US 24.						
EF0	N of Sun River Terrace to S of Grant Park	Kankakee	IL	41.1575°N 87.7302°W	03:15–03:21	5.48 mi (8.82 km)	75 yd (69 m)
EF0	A tornado caused scattered damage to trees, roofs of outbuildings, and power poles.						
EF1	SE of Kentland	Newton	IN	40.7495°N 87.4598°W	03:26–03:31	5.47 mi (8.80 km)	50 yd (46 m)
EF1	This narrow tornado initially downed large tree branches before peaking in intensity as it crossed US 41 southeast of Kentland. A billboard was blown over, a restaurant had most of its roof removed, a semitruck was pushed over, and a farm outbuilding was damaged. Debris was thrown nearly 2 miles (3.2 km) downstream into an open field north of US 24, which is where the tornado dissipated after crossing the highway.						
EF0	NNE of Sherburnville, IL to Lowell, IN to E of Lake Dalecarlia, IN	Kankakee (IL), Lake (IN)	IL, IN	41.2498°N 87.5356°W	03:28–03:38	10.23 mi (16.46 km)	250 yd (230 m)
EF0	A tornado began near the Illinois–Indiana border, producing tree damage and minor structural impacts before moving northeast and causing additional tree damage near US 41. As it tracked toward and through Lowell, it damaged a gas station canopy along SR 2 and blew out a garage wall at a residence, while continuing to produce scattered tree damage and minor structural impacts. The tornado then moved south of the Lake Dalecarlia area, where damage consisted mainly of downed trees and minor structural damage from falling debris, before dissipating prior to reaching SR 55.						
EF0	Tilton	Vermilion	IL	40.0916°N 87.6427°W	03:45	0.41 mi (0.66 km)	200 yd (180 m)
EF0	A few trees had minor damage in Tilton.						

=== April 18 event ===
List of confirmed tornadoes – Saturday, April 18, 2026
EF#	Location	County / Parish	State	Start Coord.	Time (UTC)	Path length	Max width
EF0	N of South Bend	St. Joseph	IN	41.7515°N 86.3158°W	04:51–04:53	1.28 mi (2.06 km)	200 yd (180 m)
EF0	Several trees were downed, a few of which fell onto buildings and damaged them.						

=== Ringle, Wisconsin ===
Ringle, Wisconsin
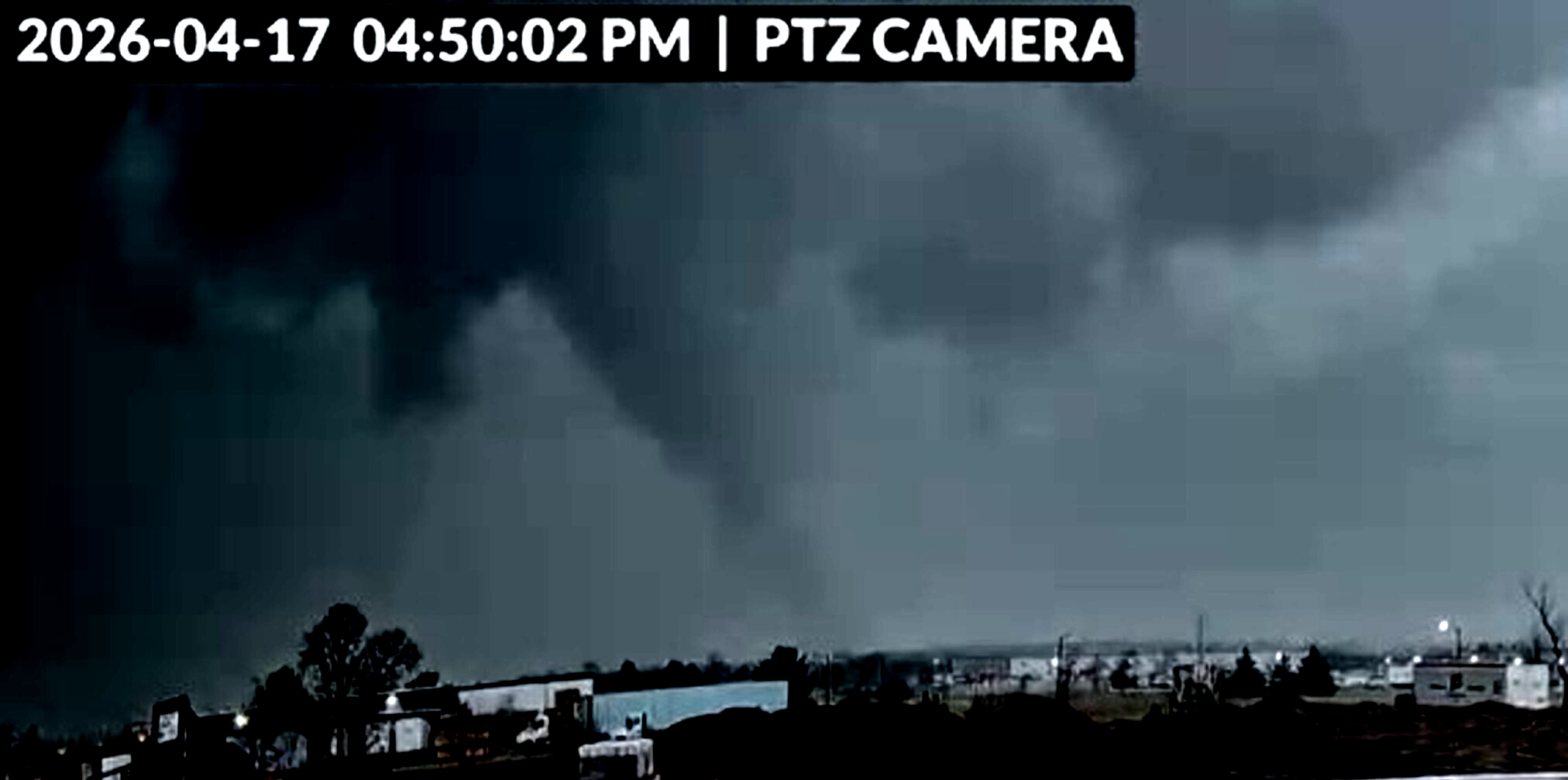
- The tornado in Ringle as seen from a construction site security camera

Meteorological history
- Formed: April 17, 2026, 4:46 p.m. CDT (UTC–05:00)
- Dissipated: April 17, 2026, 5:03 p.m. CDT (UTC–05:00)
- Duration: 17 minutes

EF3 tornado
- on the Enhanced Fujita scale
- Highest winds: 145 mph (233 km/h)

Overall effects
- Fatalities: 0
- Injuries: 0
- Damage: $8.2 million (2026 USD)

This intense and destructive tornado first touched down at 4:46 p.m. CDT in Marathon County, Wisconsin, just 3 miles (4.8 km) west-southwest of Ringle, and just south of Martin Road. The tornado tracked northeastward, crossing Martin Road before turning more to the north and snapping hundreds of trees as it crossed WIS 29. The tornado crossed Ringle Road and tracked along the Eau Claire River, producing EF1 damage to trees before entering more residential areas in the northwest portions of Ringle. The tornado inflicted EF1 damage to a home before crossing Blue Anchor Drive and producing significant damage to various homes and trees along Sattler Lane and Abbey Street. In this area, three residences sustained low-end EF3 damage, with the roofs, exterior walls, and some interior walls of the homes being mostly removed. Numerous trees nearby also sustained EF3 damage, with hundreds being downed and many being snapped at the base of the trunk. The nearby Riverside Elementary School sustained EF1 damage to its roof.

EF3 damage to a home in Ringle, Wisconsin

The tornado curved more to the northeast, passing just east of the Abbey Street/River Road intersection before inflicting EF1–EF2 damage to various homes and outbuildings along Happy Trails Lane and Timber Crest Drive. A large recreational vehicle was rolled onto its roof, and nearby trees sustained significant damage. The tornado continued northeastward, completely demolishing several outbuildings and damaging the roofs of homes as it approached and crossed Club House Road. The tornado inflicted EF1 damage to trees as it followed the Eau Claire River, before sharply turning more eastward as it crossed River Road. The tornado made another turn to the northeast after crossing County Road Q, before once again turning more eastward after crossing County Road N. The tornado continued through rural fields before dissipating at 5:03 p.m. CDT, 5 miles (8.0 km) southwest of Hogarty. The tornado reached a maximum width of 600 yards (550 m) and tracked for 13.53 miles (21.77 km).

The tornado impacted around 139 homes along its track, with 101 homes sustaining minor damage, 25 sustaining major damage, and 13 being destroyed. Around $8.2 million (2026 USD) in damages was inflicted by the tornado, and it was the first EF3 tornado to impact the area since a tornado struck the city of Merrill in 2011. Despite the damage sustained, no fatalities or injuries were attributed to the tornado.

== Non-tornadic effects ==
In Milwaukee, Wisconsin, flooding occurred near I-94 and Mitchell Boulevard on April 17, prompting the closure of an eastbound I-94 exit ramp near American Family Field. The Fox River overflowed in Burlington, flooding streets and basements on April 18. In the New London area, the Wolf River broke its previous record from 1979, cresting at 12.12 ft (3.69 m) on April 18. About 1,800 people were told to evacuate in parts of Weyauwega, Fremont, and New London.

== See also ==
- List of United States tornadoes in April 2026
