= Olympia High School (Stanford, Illinois) =

Location
- 7832 North 100 E Road; Stanford, Illinois 61774; United States
- Coordinates: 40°23′47″N 89°14′50″W

Information
- Type: Public
- School district: Olympic Community Unit School District #16
- NCES School ID: 172989003096
- Principal: Jonathan Cox
- Staff: 36.00 (FTE)
- Grades: 9-12
- Enrollment: 493 (2023-2024)
- Student to teacher ratio: 13.69
- Colors: Columbia blue, Navy blue, White
- Athletics: IHSA
- Athletics conference: Illini Prairie Conference
- Mascot: Spartan
- Website: olympia.org/o/ohs

Olympia High School is a school located about 3 miles (4.8 km) southwest of Stanford, Illinois, in McLean County. The school had a graduation rate in 2007 of 90.3%, a ratio the school's principal attributed to tough attendance regulations and after school programs. The school is part of Olympia Community Unit School District 16, which includes the towns of Atlanta, Armington, Danvers, Hopedale, McLean, Minier, Stanford, and Waynesville.

== Notable alumni ==
- Kelly Loeffler (born 1970), American businesswoman and politician
