= Illinois Route 122 =

Highway in central Illinois

Illinois Route 122
- IL 122 highlighted in red

Route information
- Maintained by IDOT
- Length: 31.53 mi (50.74 km)
- Existed: 1924–present

Major junctions
- West end: IL 29 near Green Valley
- I-155 in Hopedale
- East end: IL 9 near Danvers

Location
- Country: United States
- State: Illinois
- Counties: McLean, Tazewell

Highway system
- Illinois State Highway System; Interstate; US; State; Tollways; Scenic
← IL 121	→ IL 123

Illinois Route 122 (IL 122) is a 31.53-mile-long (50.74 km) east–west highway in the U.S. state of Illinois. Its western terminus is at a junction with IL 29 west of Delavan. It runs east to a junction with IL 9 in McLean County west of Bloomington.

== Route description ==
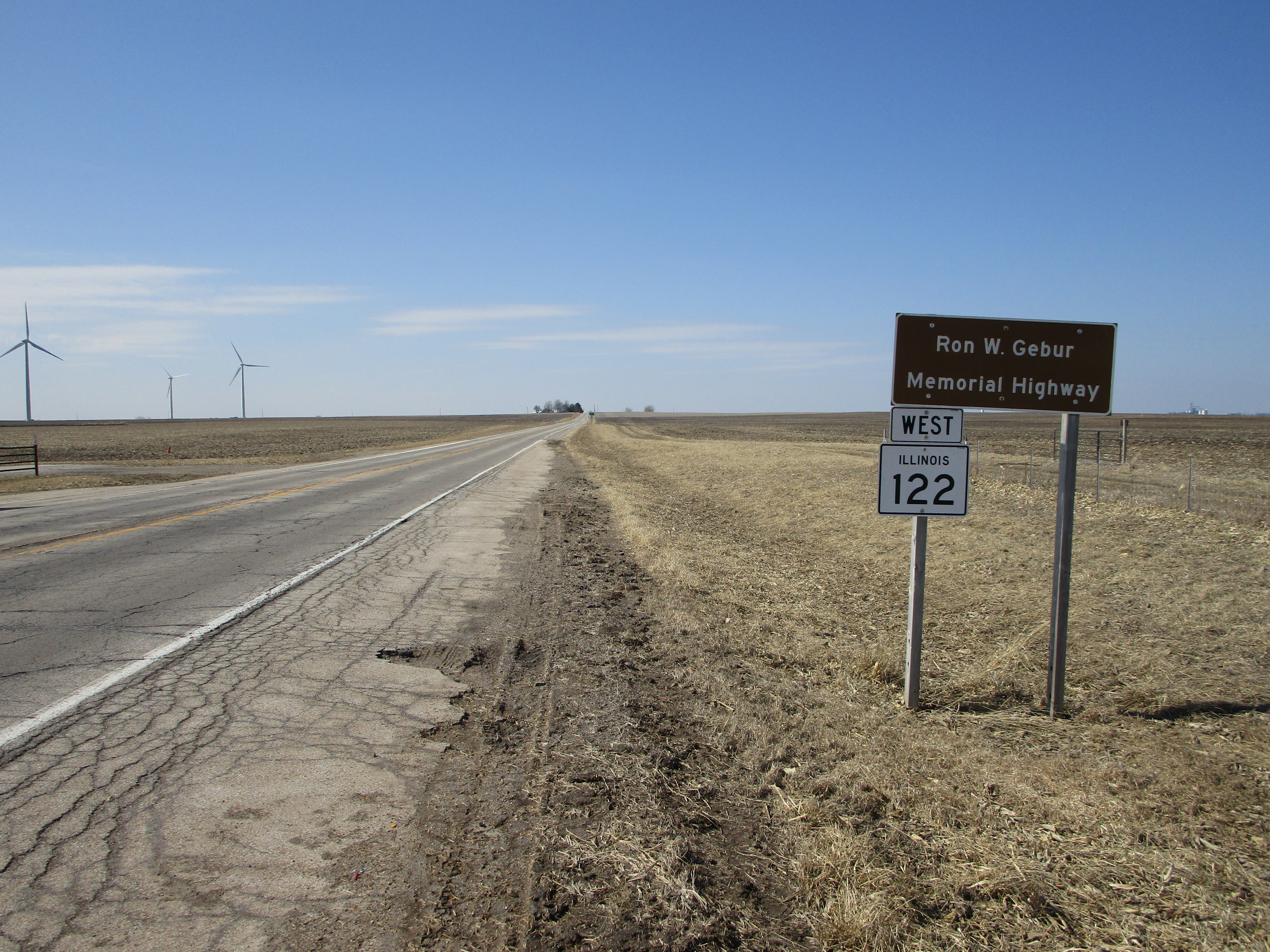
IL 122 west of I-155, signed as Ron W. Gebur Memorial Highway

Illinois Route 122 begins at Illinois Route 29, 5 miles west of Delavan. The highway travels east through Delavan. Five miles east of Delavan, the highway makes a 3-mile northbound concurrency with Interstate 155. After its concurrency with Interstate 155, the highway travels mainly east, passing along the north sides of Hopedale, Minier, and Stanford. East of Stanford, the highway shifts direction and travels due north for 4 miles. The highway then continues east for less than one mile to its eastern terminus at Illinois Route 9. This route serves the Tazewell County city of Delavan and the villages of Hopedale and Minier. It also serves the McLean County village of Stanford.

== History ==
SBI Route 122 ran from Havana at the Illinois River to Bloomington on what was Illinois Route 9, Illinois 122, Illinois Route 29 and U.S. Route 136. By 1937, the routing of Illinois 122 had been settled.

== Major intersections ==
County	Location	mi	km	Destinations	Notes
Tazewell	Malone Township	0.0	0.0	IL 29 – Springfield, Pekin	Western terminus of IL 122
Tazewell	Boynton Township	10.0	16.1	I-155 south – Lincoln	Southern end of I-155 concurrency, exit 15
Tazewell	Hopedale	13.3	21.4	I-155 north – Peoria	Northern end of I-155 concurrency, exit 19
McLean	Allin–Danvers township line	31.53	50.74	IL 9 – Pekin, Bloomington	Eastern terminus of IL 122
1.000 mi = 1.609 km; 1.000 km = 0.621 mi: Concurrency terminus
