= Olympia Community Unit School District 16 =

School district in Illinois, United States

Community Unit School District No. 16

Address
- 903 East 800 North Road Stanford, McLean County, Illinois, 61774-9612; United States

District information
- Type: Public unit district
- Grades: Pre-K–12
- Established: July 1, 1967
- Schools: Olympia High School; Olympia Middle School; 3 elementary schools
- NCES District ID: 1729890
- District ID: 17-064-0160-26-0000

Students and staff
- Students: 1872
- Teachers: 117 (FTE)
- Student–teacher ratio: 21.1 (primary); 15.7 (high school)

Other information
- Website: www.olympia.org

Olympia Community Unit School District 16 is a unit school district in central Illinois. Its territory is the largest in Illinois, covering 377 square miles (980 km^{2}) over parts of five counties. It operates Olympia High School, Olympia Middle School, and its district offices on one campus in Mount Hope Township, McLean County; Olympia North Elementary School in Danvers, McLean County; Olympia South Elementary School in Atlanta, Logan County; and Olympia West Elementary School in Minier, Tazewell County.

== History ==
Olympia was formed from five unit school districts that operated seven high schools:

- McLean-Waynesville had formed a unit district in 1954 to operate under a single high school in McLean.
- Armington, Hopedale, and Minier had formed a unit district named Trioka in 1964, and still had three high schools.
- Three other unit districts, in Atlanta, Danvers and Stanford, each had its own grade and high schools.

The new school district was approved by the voters by a ratio of 3-to-1 on November 12, 1966, and District 16 took over the school system on July 1, 1967. The voters then approved a bond issue of $4,000,000 in November 1967. Lawsuits challenging the district's creation and bond issue continued until December 23, 1969. Because of the lawsuits that could possibly make the district vanish, banks refused to fund the new district with tax anticipation warrants and the schools were in danger of closing by April 1968, but the state Superintendent of Public Instruction worked to get state and federal funds early to the district, and the schools stayed open.

After the lawsuits were finalized, the district finally sold its building bonds on April 2, 1970. By investing the money, the district earned another $472,000 in interest, which was added to the original $4,000,000 of bonds and an additional $530,900 in regular funds, to build the high school. Olympia High School opened on September 1, 1972.

== Boundary ==
In McLean County, the district includes Stanford, Danvers, McLean, and a portion of the Twin Grove census-designated place. It also includes a small portion of Bloomington.

In Tazewell County, the district includes Minier, Armington, and Hopedale.

In Logan County, the district includes Atlanta.

In DeWitt County, the district includes Waynesville.

The district extends into Woodford County.
