= James Ash (disambiguation) =

James Ash (born 1973) is an English-born Australian musician.

James Ash may also refer to:

- James Ash (MP) (died 1400), English politician
- Jim Ash, radio host on WLCN

== See also ==
- James Ashe (1674–1733), English politician
