= Hewitt, Wisconsin =

Hewitt is the name of some places in the U.S. state of Wisconsin:

- Hewitt, Marathon County, Wisconsin, a town
- Hewitt, Wood County, Wisconsin, a village
