= Interstate 155 (Illinois) =

Highway in Illinois

Interstate 155
- I-155 highlighted in red

Route information
- Auxiliary route of I-55
- Maintained by IDOT
- Length: 32.13 mi (51.71 km)
- Existed: December 15, 1989–present
- History: Completed October 29, 1992
- NHS: Entire route

Major junctions
- South end: I-55 near Lincoln
- US 136 near Emden; IL 122 in Hopedale; IL 9 in Tremont; IL 98 in Morton
- North end: I-74 in Morton

Location
- Country: United States
- State: Illinois
- Counties: Logan, Tazewell

Highway system
- Interstate Highway System; Main; Auxiliary; Suffixed; Business; Future; Illinois State Highway System; Interstate; US; State; Tollways; Scenic
← IL 154	→ IL 155

Interstate 155 (I-155) is a north–south spur of I-55 that provides an Interstate connection for the Illinois cities of Peoria and Lincoln. The northern terminus is just east of Peoria, at I-74 exit 101 in Morton. The southern terminus, which is northwest of Lincoln, is located on I-55 at exit 127. The highway is 32.13 miles (51.71 km) long.

I-155 was created to replace Illinois Route 121 (IL 121). Prompted by safety concerns at a major intersection near Morton, state transportation officials replaced the entire route with a limited-access freeway. The Interstate was built in several segments from 1970 to 1992, a period that included a 10-year delay due to a lawsuit over right-of-way. I-155 fully opened to traffic on October 29, 1992.

== Route description ==
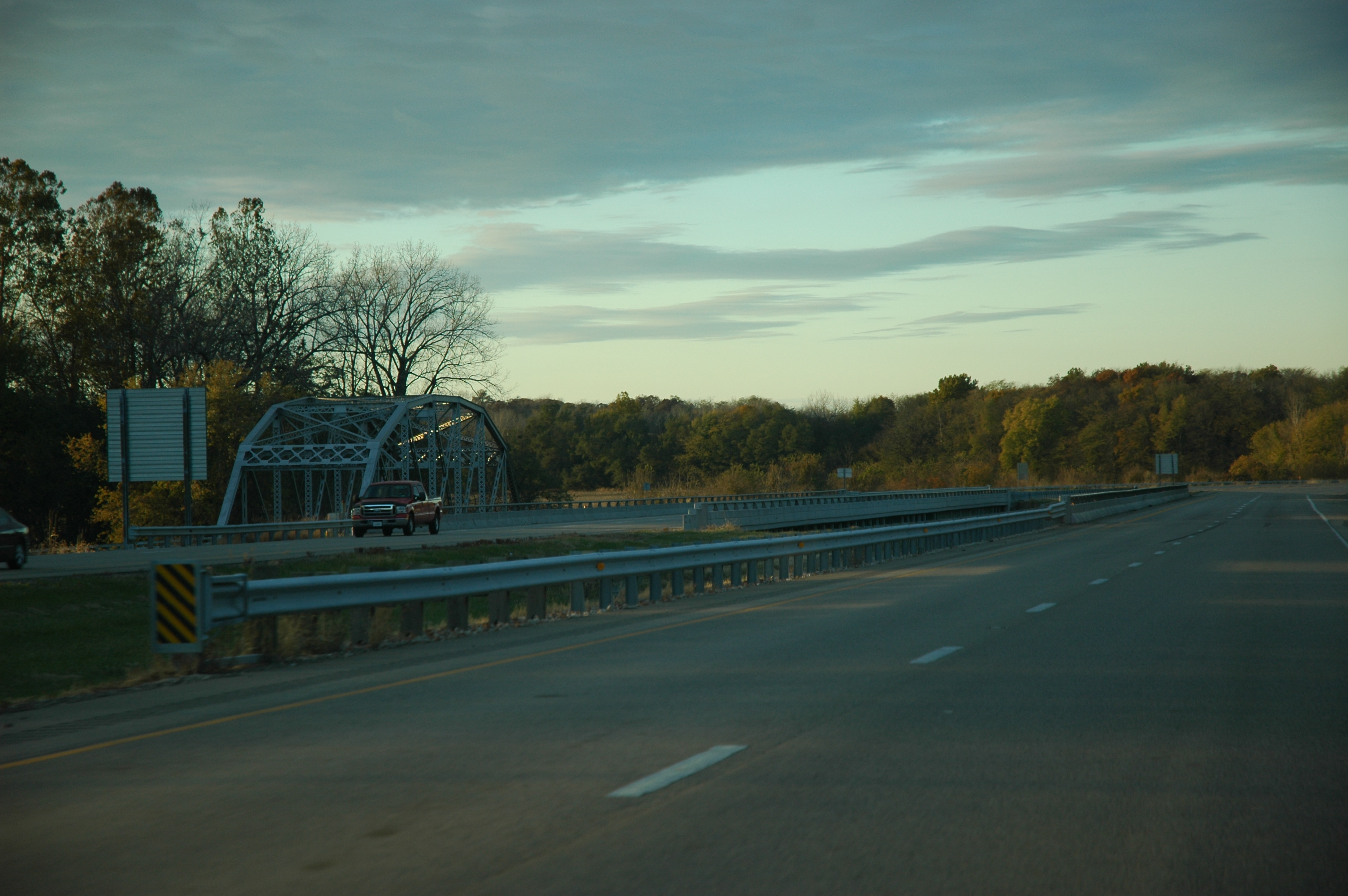
I-155 at the Mackinaw River. Note the bridge to the left, which formerly carried IL 121.

I-155 runs north from I-55 just northwest of Lincoln, intersecting U.S. Route 136 (US 136) east of Emden. Five miles (8.0 km) north of US 136, eastbound IL 122 joins I-155 traveling north, directly east of Delavan. The two highways run concurrent for four miles (6.4 km) before IL 122 runs east to Hopedale. Further north, the highway crosses the Mackinaw River beside a steel truss bridge serving old IL 121.

East of Tremont, I-155 intersects IL 9. Four miles (6.4 km) later is Main Street, the first of three northbound exits to Morton. (There are only two southbound exits, at Queenwood Road and IL 98/Birchwood Street). The highway passes to the west of Morton before intersecting I-74 at a trumpet interchange about eight miles (13 km) southeast of downtown Peoria.

Surrounded mostly by prime land used for farming soybeans and corn, I-155 is a four-lane freeway through rural central Illinois. In addition to Morton, Peoria, and Lincoln, I-155 also serves a number of small farm towns located between Peoria and Lincoln. The largest city directly served by I-155 is Tremont; however, the highway mainly carries traffic traveling to and from Peoria and Springfield.

== History ==
I-155 was built on the right-of-way of former IL 121. In the early 1960s, the Illinois Department of Transportation (IDOT) opened IL 98, an east–west, two-lane highway running west from downtown Morton to Pekin. Within a few years, the intersection of IL 98 and IL 121 would be known as the "Killer Corner", as traffic volumes increased between Springfield and Peoria on IL 121. Between when IL 98 was opened and when the corner was closed in 1989 for construction of a full interchange, 15 people were killed as a result of automobile accidents at the corner. Led by key supporters—US Representative Robert Michel, former IDOT transportation engineer Jack Harland, and pro-freeway organization "Route 121 by '91" chairman Jim Unland—IDOT initiated plans to upgrade IL 121 to a four-lane freeway. The proposed freeway was assigned as FAP 406. Near Hopedale, a short portion of IL 121 was reconstructed in the early 1970s to replace a bridge over the Mackinaw River. The interchange with I-55 was built but barricaded to traffic.

In 1976, an injunction won by Peoria attorney Timothy Swain Sr. halted further construction on the highway for 10 years. The lawsuit was filed by Swain regarding the amount of right-of-way the freeway would consume on his 440-acre (180 ha) farm near Delavan. A US District Court judge sided with IDOT on building the road, but the US Court of Appeals for the 7th Circuit overturned the decision, forcing IDOT to rewrite its environmental impact statement regarding the Swain farm. In 1986, IDOT struck a deal with Swain, agreeing to reroute the road and take only 40 acres (16 ha) of land, ending the lawsuit and resuming construction activities. A portion of the road from I-55 to Hartsburg opened on December 15, 1989, about seven miles (11 km) in length. The freeway was opened in full on October 29, 1992, at a ceremony attended by Governor Jim Edgar. The total cost of construction for I-155 was $130 million (equivalent to $260 million in 2024). Of this, $10 million (equivalent to $20 million in 2024) was provided by federal funding.

Illinois initially applied for the new freeway to be designated Interstate 37, but, on December 7, 1990, the request was deferred by the American Association of State Highway and Transportation Officials (AASHTO), pending approval by the Federal Highway Administration (FHWA) to add the freeway into the Interstate System. In addition, AASHTO suggested using a three-digit number when the application was resubmitted. Later, the state submitted another application to AASHTO for the freeway to be named Interstate 155. On June 9, 1991, the AASHTO application was approved and granted when I-155 was completed.

== Exit list ==
County	Location	mi	km	Exit	Destinations	Notes
Logan		0.00	0.00	0	I-55 – Chicago, Lincoln, St. Louis	Southern terminus; signed as exits 0A (south) and 0B (north); exit 127 on I-55
Logan		6.04	9.72	6	Hartsburg	
Logan		10.25	16.50	10	US 136 – McLean, Havana	
Tazewell		15.26	24.56	15	IL 122 west – Delavan	South end of IL 122 concurrency
Tazewell	Hopedale	18.48	29.74	19	IL 122 east – Hopedale	North end of IL 122 concurrency
Tazewell		22.41	36.07	22	Townline Road	
Tazewell	Tremont	25.52	41.07	25	IL 9 – Pekin, Bloomington	
Tazewell		28.46	45.80	28	Broadway Road	
Tazewell	Morton	29.19	46.98	29	Main Street	Northbound exit and southbound entrance
Tazewell	Morton	30.26	48.70	30	Queenwood Road	Southbound exit and northbound entrance
Tazewell	Morton	30.97	49.84	31	IL 98 west (Birchwood Street) – Pekin	
Tazewell	Morton	32.13	51.71		I-74 to I-474 – Peoria, Bloomington	Northern terminus; exit 101 on I-74
1.000 mi = 1.609 km; 1.000 km = 0.621 mi: Concurrency terminus; Incomplete access
