= WLCN =

WLCN may refer to:

- WLCN (FM), a radio station (96.3 FM) licensed to Atlanta, Illinois, United States
- WLCN-CD, a television station (channel 18) licensed to Charleston, South Carolina, United States
- WAZE-TV, a former television station (channel 19) licensed to Madisonville, Kentucky, United States that previously held the WLCN calls
