= Dixie Travel Plaza =

Interstate 55 travel plaza in Illinois

Coordinates: 40.3104°N 89.1690°W

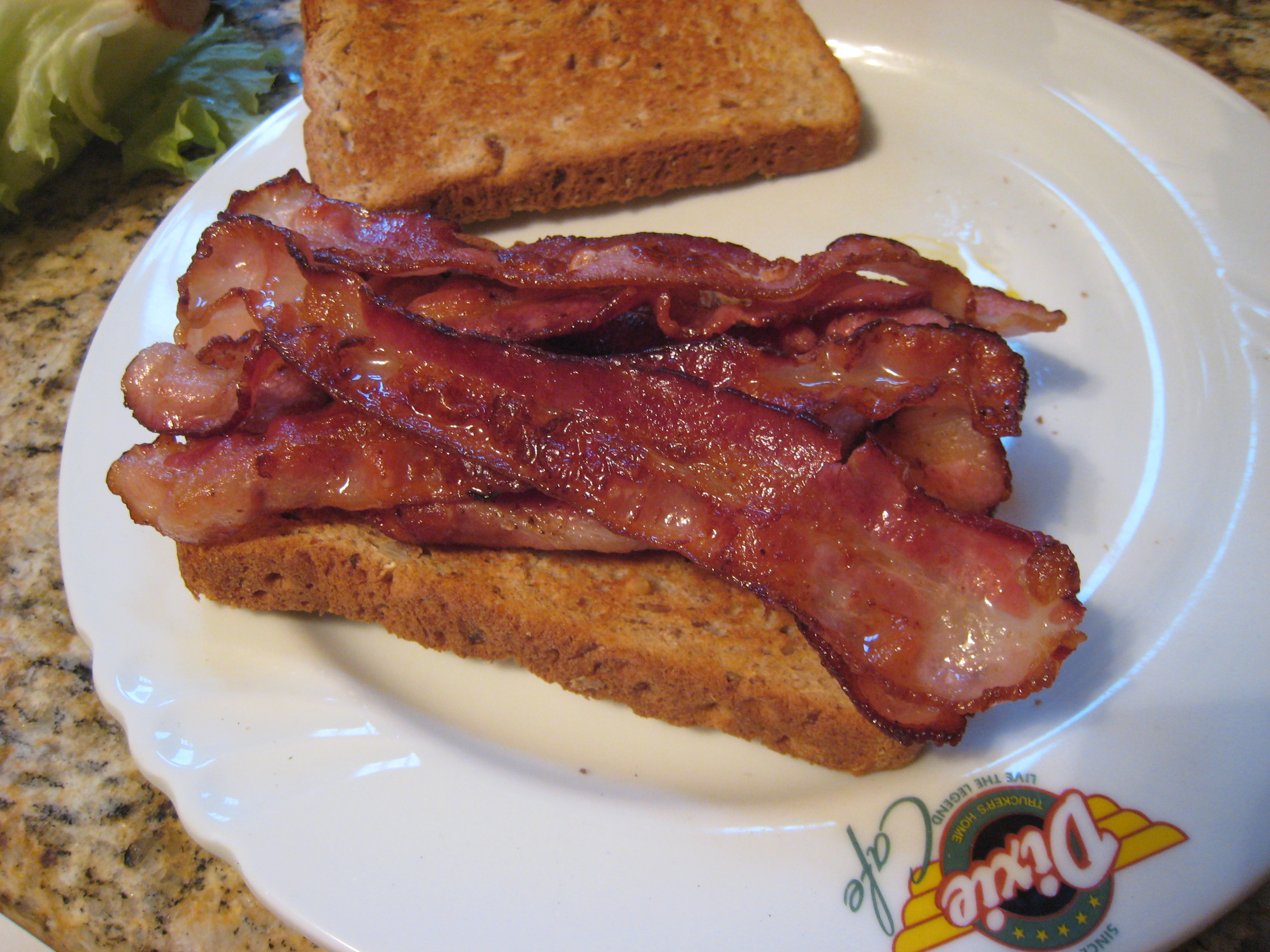
A typical breakfast dish served at the Dixie

The Dixie Travel Plaza, previously known as the Dixie Truck Stop and Dixie Trucker's Home, is a large trucker and travel plaza located in McLean, Illinois, on Interstate 55. It was established by J.P. Walters and John Geske in 1928 on old US Route 66 as a small sandwich stand in a truck mechanic's garage. By 1930, quickly growing demand had necessitated expansion into a full-size restaurant. The restaurant was expanded several times afterwards, and rebuilt once after a fire in 1965. Walters, Geske and the Dixie Trucker's Home have been recognized by the Route 66 Association of Illinois for their contributions—from 1926 to 1977—to the character of Route 66. They were inducted into the association's hall of fame on June 9, 1990. Dixie was previously home to the Route 66 Hall of Fame when it opened in 1990. In 2003, after Dixie changed ownership, the museum was moved to a new, larger location in Pontiac, Illinois.

Dixie Travel Plaza is frequently mentioned in travel books and histories of Old US Route 66. It has also been the subject of articles in the Chicago Tribune in articles about Old Route 66. Dixie was referred to as "one of the most impressive" late night stops along I-55. When the Interstate system was constructed and Route 66 was decommissioned, the portion of Route 66 that Dixie was located on became a portion of I-55.

== Expansion ==
In 2003, the original owners sold the business, after which it was renamed "Dixie Travel Plaza". It was purchased by a company in Providence, Rhode Island. The name was expanded into a chain when the new owners bought two additional truck stop locations and branded them as Dixie Travel Plazas. The other locations are in Tuscola, Illinois and Effingham, Illinois.

In January, 2009, Dixie Travel Plaza was sold again to Ben Gulley of LeRoy, Illinois, after which it underwent a major renovation. In June, 2012, it was sold to Road Ranger of Rockford, Illinois, after which it underwent a complete remodel.
