= Illinois Route 98 =

State highway in Tazewell County, Illinois, US

Illinois Route 98
- Edgewater Drive; Birchwood Street
- Route 98 highlighted in red

Route information
- Maintained by IDOT
- Length: 8.36 mi (13.45 km)
- Existed: 1937–present

Major junctions
- West end: IL 29 in Pekin
- East end: I-155 in Morton

Location
- Country: United States
- State: Illinois
- Counties: Tazewell

Highway system
- Illinois State Highway System; Interstate; US; State; Tollways; Scenic
| ← IL 97 | → IL 99 |

Illinois Route 98 (IL 98, Route 98) is an 8.36-mile (13.45 km) east–west state highway located entirely within Tazewell County in central Illinois. The route runs from Route 29 on the border of Pekin and North Pekin east to Interstate 155 (I-155) in Morton. The highway connects Pekin, North Pekin, Morton, and the community of Groveland; it passes through a variety of landscapes between the towns. Route 98 is maintained by the Illinois Department of Transportation.

The state of Illinois created Route 98 in 1924; the original route connected several cities in western Illinois. The eastern section of this route appeared on maps by 1928, and the highway was completed in 1929. In 1939, Route 98 moved to its current alignment. Its eastern terminus was truncated from downtown Morton to I-155 in the 1990s.

== Route description ==
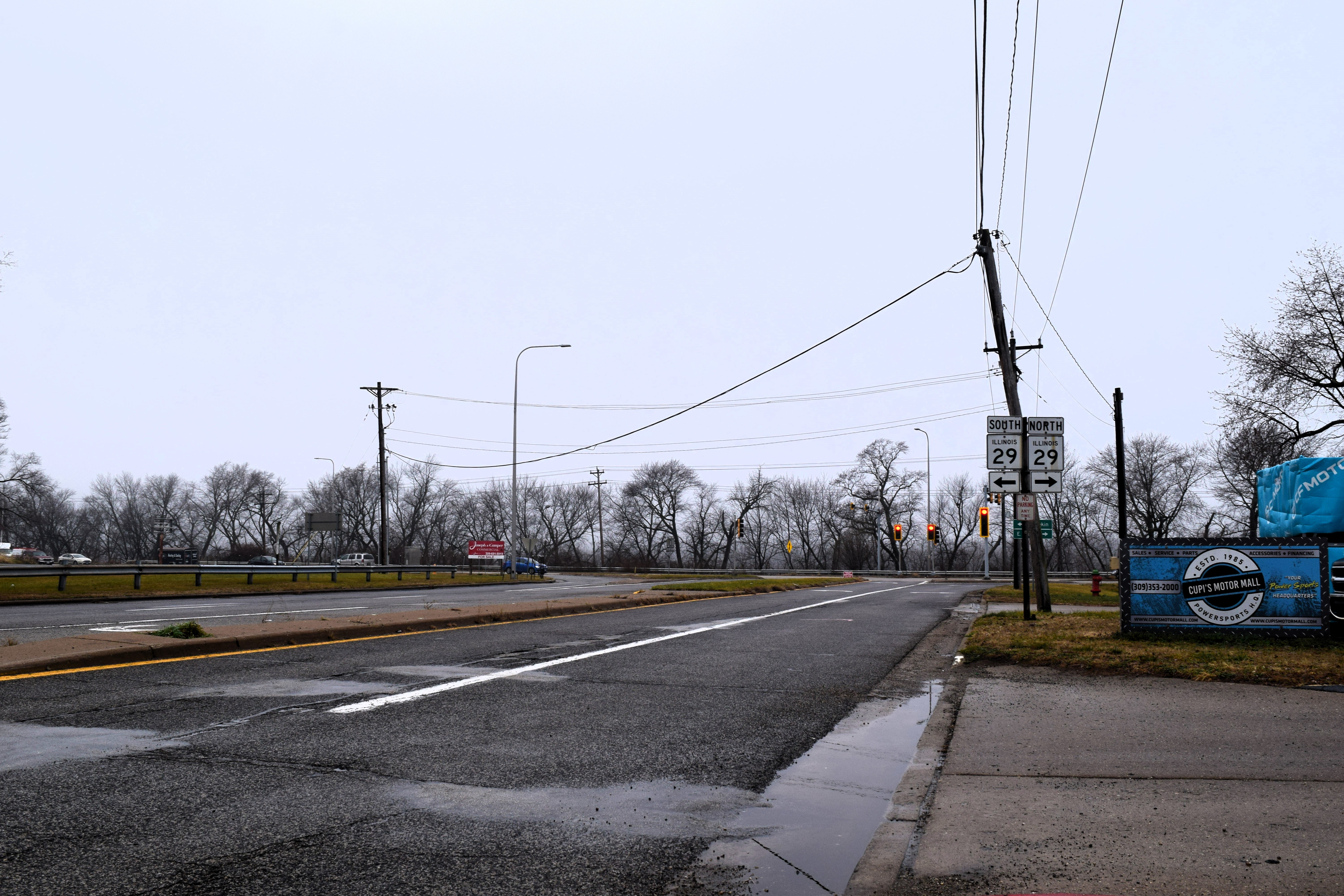
Western terminus of Route 98

Route 98 begins at an intersection with Route 29 on the border of Pekin and North Pekin; Worley Lake and the Illinois River lie to the west. The route heads east as a divided two-lane road called Edgewater Drive, passing a group of houses which lie between two small lakes. After entering North Pekin, the highway becomes undivided and runs through a business district. It intersects County Route 25, known locally as Parkway Road, before crossing into Pekin. Route 98 enters a forested area in Pekin and passes to the north of John T. McNaughton Park near the city's eastern border.

After leaving Pekin, Route 98 passes through farmland in unincorporated Groveland Township. The highway meets Cole Hollow Road and California Road at successive intersections in a residential area. Past a creek, the road heads into a rural area with sections of farmland and forest. As it enters Groveland, the highway intersects County Route 1, which runs south through the community. Route 98 leaves Groveland to the east, running through another farmed area. The route curves into Morton and takes the name Birchwood Street, traversing a creek before entering an industrial district. In this area, Route 98 briefly becomes a divided highway before terminating at exit 31 on I-155. The road continues past the terminus as a local street, still carrying the name Birchwood Street.

Route 98 is maintained by the Illinois Department of Transportation (IDOT), an Illinois state agency responsible for maintaining highways and other transport infrastructure in the state. IDOT is responsible for collecting traffic data on Illinois state highways; this data is measured in terms of annual average daily traffic, an estimate of the number of vehicles which use a road on any given day in a particular year. In 2009, IDOT estimated that 4400 vehicles used the western portion of Route 98, 3900 used the central portion, and 3700 used the eastern portion. No part of Route 98 is included in the National Highway System, a network of roads considered significant to the nation's economy, defense, and mobility.

== History ==
=== Original Route 98 ===
Route 98 was initially designated in 1924 on a route in western Illinois. The state planned the road to connect Route 3 east of Macomb to Route 95 near Havana by way of Adair, Table Grove, Ipava, and Duncan Mills. The route was first marked on the 1928 Illinois highway map; at this point, the road connected Table Grove in the west to U.S. Route 24 (US 24) and Route 31 at Duncans Mills in the east. By 1929, the highway's western terminus was extended to Route 9 east of Macomb.

The original Route 98 in Western Illinois route became part of Route 10 in 1937. The original Route 98 is now part of US 136.

=== Renumbering ===
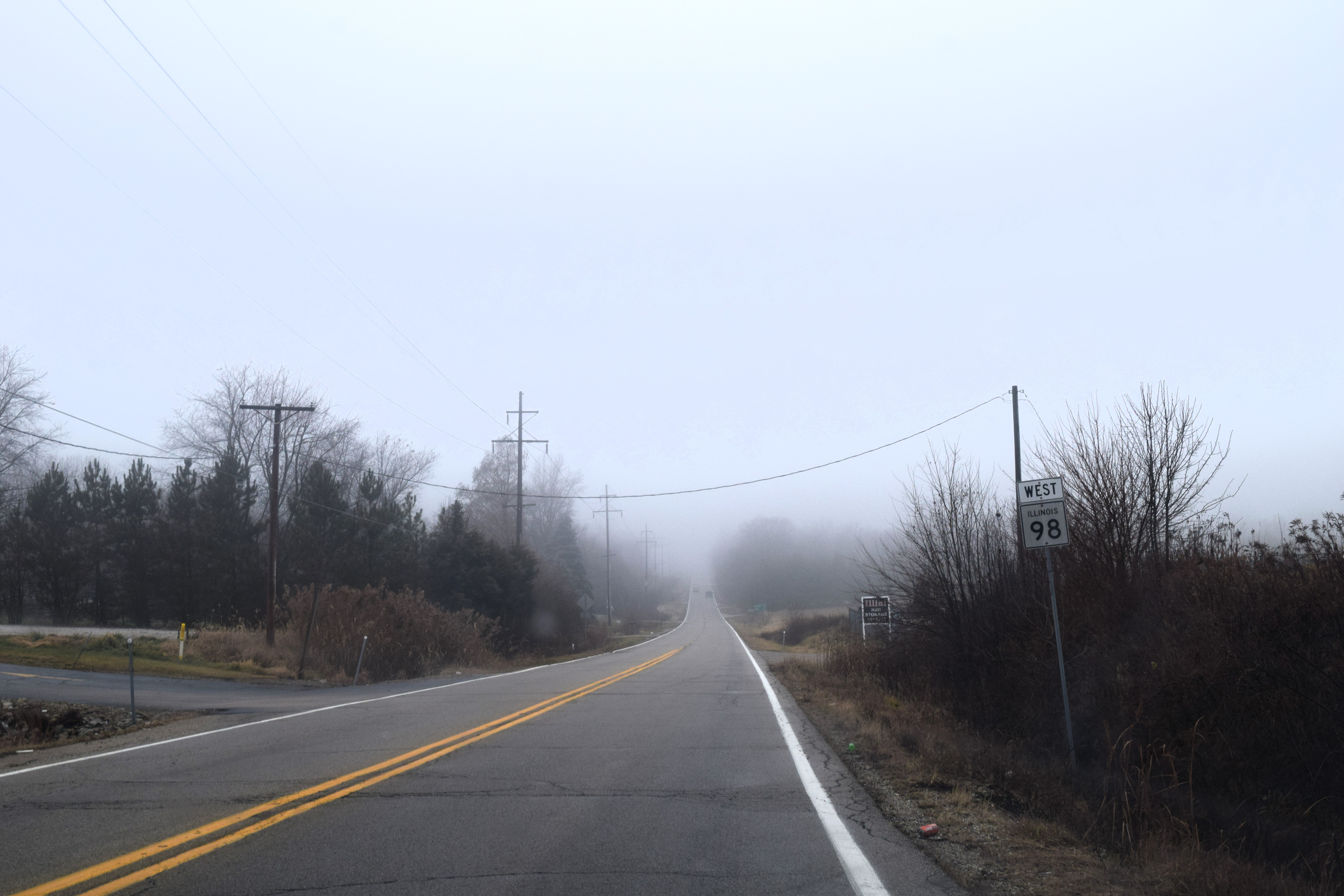
Westbound Route 98

When the Route 98 designation was dropped in Western Illinois in 1937, it was reused for the present alignment, the former Route 9 between Pekin and Morton, and the Route 9 designation was itself shifted south onto the former Route 164 through Tremont. The original eastern end of the route was at the intersection of US 150 and Main Street in downtown Morton; it was truncated to I-155 between 1995 and 1997.

== Major intersections ==
The entire route is in Tazewell County.

| Location | mi | km | Destinations | Notes |
|---|---|---|---|---|
| Pekin–North Pekin line | 0.0 | 0.0 | IL 29 (Radio City Drive) – East Peoria, Pekin | Western terminus |
| Morton | 8.3 | 13.4 | I-155 to I-74 – Lincoln, Peoria, Bloomington | Eastern terminus |
1.000 mi = 1.609 km; 1.000 km = 0.621 mi
