= McLean, Illinois =

McLean
- Village
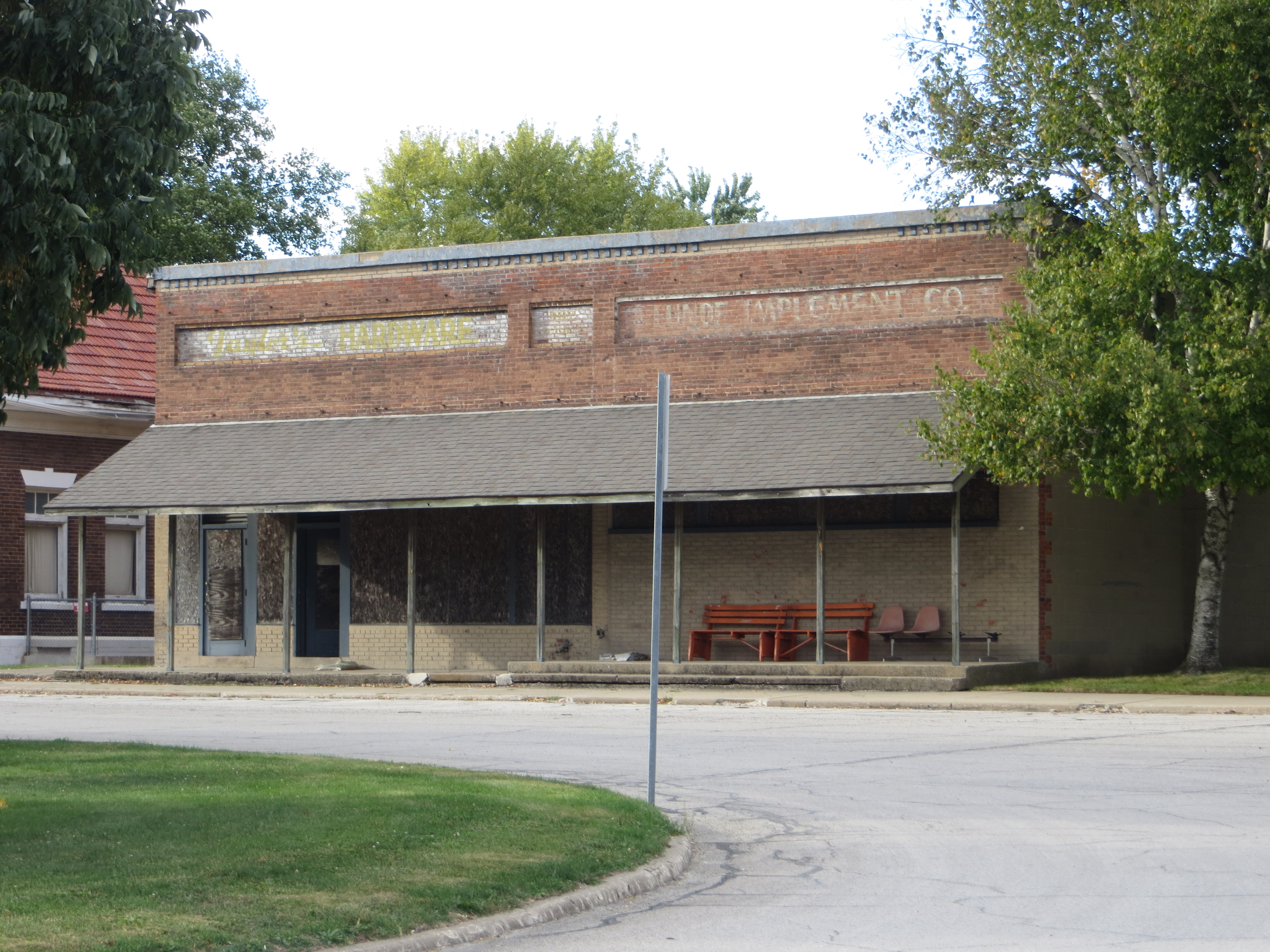
- Old building in McLean

- Location in McLean County, Illinois
- Coordinates: 40°18′49″N 89°10′07″W
- Country: United States
- State: Illinois
- County: McLean
- Township: Mount Hope

Area
  - Total: 1.18 sq mi (3.05 km^{2})
  - Land: 1.18 sq mi (3.05 km^{2})
  - Water: 0 sq mi (0.00 km^{2})
- Elevation: 709 ft (216 m)

Population (2020)
  - Total: 743
  - Density: 631.1/sq mi (243.67/km^{2})
- Time zone: UTC-6 (CST)
  - Summer (DST): UTC-5 (CDT)
- ZIP code: 61754
- Area code: 309
- FIPS code: 17-45811
- GNIS ID: 2399296
- Website: www.mclean-il.com

McLean is a village in McLean County, Illinois, United States. The population was 743 at the 2020 census, down from 830 in 2010. It is part of the Bloomington–Normal metropolitan area. McLean is the home of the Dixie Travel Plaza.

== History ==
=== Founding ===
The village of McLean was laid out on June 22, 1855, by Franklin Price (1821 - 1908). Price was born in Chester Valley, Pennsylvania, and was the brother-in-law of Bloomington real estate developer Kersey Fell. Price came to Bloomington in 1849; he worked as a clerk and newspaper writer and was elected mayor of Bloomington in 1855 and again in 1856, serving until 1858. Price never lived in the new town he founded.

McLean was laid out when the Alton and Springfield Railroad, soon to become the Alton Railroad, was first built through McLean County. The nearby towns of Atlanta, Normal, and Towanda were laid out at the same time as McLean. There had been an earlier attempt to found a town nearby.

Mt. Hope, two miles east of McLean, was established in 1836 by the Providence Farmers and Mechanics Emigrating Society of Rhode Island. The colony and its town were not a success; only three settlers actually arrived in McLean County. When the town of McLean was founded, the church building from Mt. Hope was moved into McLean. The first residents of McLean were the brothers G.L. and F.A. Wheelock, railroad employees, who moved into the new station house to conduct business. A blacksmith shop was the first business, and H.H. Dillon built the first warehouse.

McLean was incorporated as a village on May 29, 1866. By 1900, it had grown to a population of 532.

=== Original town design ===
The design of the original town of McLean remains almost unaltered to this day from the original plans. The design was similar to other places along the Alton and Springfield Railroad, including Normal, Towanda, Odell, and Dwight. The original town was basically a square with streets aligned north–south and east–west, split diagonally by the railroad with a line of lots paralleling either side of the tracks.

As in other towns along the same railroad, there was a widened rectangular area paralleling the tracks labeled "Depot Grounds." In the case of McLean, the depot grounds were laid out only on the southeast side of the railroad. The triangle of land on the northwest side, between the lots paralleling the railroad and remainder of the town, was designated as a public property and is still used as a park. The comparable triangle on the opposite side of the tracks was unlabeled, and its intended use is unclear. This same arrangement of public land was followed at the village of Towanda.

McLean was distinctive in that there were no streets between the diagonal line of lots along the tracks. Perhaps because of this, much of the business district developed along Morgan Street, which ran east–west just north of the park, or along Hamilton Street, which ran north–south, just west of the park. The line of lots paralleling the tracks and southeast of the railroad became the location of the hotel and the town jail. Later additions on the east side of the town featured additional lots which parallel the railroad, as well as more conventional blocks.

== Geography ==
McLean is in southwestern McLean County. Interstate 55 passes through the east side of the village, with access from Exit 145 (U.S. Route 136). I-55 leads northeast 15 miles (24 km) to Bloomington, the county seat, and southwest 16 miles (26 km) to Lincoln. US 136 (Dixie Road) runs along the south edge of the village center and leads east 10 miles (16 km) to Heyworth and west 23 miles (37 km) to San Jose.

According to the U.S. Census Bureau, McLean has a total area of 1.18 square miles (3.06 km^{2}), all land.

== Demographics ==
Historical population
Census	Pop.	Note	%±
1870	600		—
1880	490		−18.3%
1890	500		2.0%
1900	532		6.4%
1910	707		32.9%
1920	697		−1.4%
1930	676		−3.0%
1940	652		−3.6%
1950	667		2.3%
1960	758		13.6%
1970	820		8.2%
1980	836		2.0%
1990	797		−4.7%
2000	808		1.4%
2010	830		2.7%
2020	743		−10.5%
Decennial US Census

As of the census of 2000, there were 808 people, 314 households, and 248 families residing in the village. The population density was 1,874.1 inhabitants per square mile (723.6/km^{2}). There were 330 housing units at an average density of 765.4 per square mile (295.5/km^{2}). The racial makeup of the village was 97.90% White, 0.74% African American, 0.12% Native American, 0.62% Asian, and 0.62% from two or more races.

There were 314 households, out of which 36.0% had children under the age of 18 living with them, 65.0% were married couples living together, 9.6% had a female householder with no husband present, and 21.0% were non-families. 19.4% of all households were made up of individuals, and 9.2% had someone living alone who was 65 years of age or older. The average household size was 2.57 and the average family size was 2.90.

In the village, the population was spread out, with 26.7% under the age of 18, 6.9% from 18 to 24, 30.3% from 25 to 44, 22.5% from 45 to 64, and 13.5% who were 65 years of age or older. The median age was 37 years. For every 100 females, there were 93.8 males. For every 100 females age 18 and over, there were 92.2 males.

The median income for a household in the village was $47,337, and the median income for a family was $52,614. Males had a median income of $37,059 versus $27,589 for females. The per capita income for the village was $19,200. About 1.2% of families and 0.7% of the population were below the poverty line, including 0.9% of those under age 18 and none of those age 65 or over.

== Local attractions ==
- Dixie Travel Plaza
- Arcadia: America's Playable Arcade Museum

== Education ==
The school district is Olympia Community Unit School District 16.
