= Homer Caton =

American politician

Homer Caton (July 1, 1887 – November 25, 1958) was an American farmer and politician.

Born on a farm in Macon County, Illinois, Caton was a farmer and lived in Stanford, Illinois. He served on the McLean County Board of Supervisors and was president of the county board. He also served on the McLean County Board of Review. Caton served in the Illinois House of Representatives from 1937 to 1957. He then worked for the Illinois Highway Patrol. Caton died after suffering a stroke.
