= Edward Buehrig =

American political scientist

- Buehrig pictured in 1940
- Born: October 4, 1910; Minier, Illinois, United States
- Died: August 31, 1986 (aged 75); Bloomington, Indiana, United States
- Occupation: Professor

Academic background
- Thesis: [Thesis "American intervention in Europe, 1917"]

Academic work
- Discipline: Political science
- Sub-discipline: International relations
- Institutions: Indiana University Bloomington
- Main interests: Wilsonianism

Edward Henry Buehrig (October 4, 1910 – August 31, 1986) was an American political scientist who spent most of his career at the Indiana University Bloomington. He was known as a leading authority on the foreign policy of Woodrow Wilson.

== Early life and education ==
Buehrig was born in Minier, Illinois, and attended Illinois State University where he served as an editor of the Vidette student newspaper. He subsequently transferred to the University of Chicago, from which he graduated. Buehrig went on to receive a M.A. in International relations, also from Chicago, with a thesis titled "Why the United States took the Philippines Islands", and later earned a Ph.D. from the same institution with his dissertation, "American Intervention in Europe, 1917".

== Career ==
In 1934 Buehrig began teaching at Indiana University, where he would remain – except for three, short interludes – until his retirement in 1981. During World War II Buehrig worked in the United States Department of State and served as Secretary-General of the Italo-Yugoslav Boundary Commission; after the war he again departed Indiana to spend a year at Princeton University researching the foreign policy of Woodrow Wilson. A third hiatus came in 1957 when he spent one year teaching at the American University of Beirut (AUB). According to Elsa Marston, she met her husband Iliya Harik at an AUB lecture given by Buehrig.

Buehrig served as acting president of the Midwest Political Science Association during 1955. On being appointed chair of the political science department at Indiana in 1980, Elinor Ostrom recalled that she "realized that Professor Buehrig would be retiring within a year [and] I shuddered to think of all the memory and insight about the Department that might be lost to future generations". At Ostrom's request, Buehrig wrote "Political Science at Indiana: An Historical Essay", chronicling the history of the department up to that point.

In May 1986, three months before his death, Illinois State University awarded Buehrig an honorary degree.

== Selected publications ==
- Buehrig, E (1950). "Wilson's Neutrality Re-Examined". World Politics, Vol. 3, No. 1, pp. 1–19
- Buehrig, E (1950). "The United States, the United Nations and Bi-Polar Politics". International Organization, Vol. 4, No. 4, pp. 573–584
- Buehrig, E (1955) Woodrow Wilson and the Balance of Power Bloomington: Indiana University Press.
- Buehrig, E (1957) Wilson's Foreign Policy in Perspective Bloomington: Indiana University Press.
- Buehrig, E (1965). "The International Pattern of Authority". World Politics, Vol. 17, No. 3, pp. 369–385
- Buehrig, E (1966) Essays in Political Science Bloomington: Indiana University Press.
- Buehrig, E (1971) The UN and the Palestinian Refugees: A Study in Nonterritorial Administration Bloomington: Indiana University Press.
- Buehrig, E (1986) The Perversity of Politics Dover, N.H.: Croom Helm.
