= Stanford, Illinois =

- Village
- Location in McLean County, Illinois
- Coordinates: 40°25′56″N 89°13′15″W
- Country: United States
- State: Illinois
- County: McLean
- Township: Allin

Area
  - Total: 0.66 sq mi (1.71 km^{2})
  - Land: 0.66 sq mi (1.71 km^{2})
  - Water: 0 sq mi (0.00 km^{2})
- Elevation: 673 ft (205 m)

Population (2020)
  - Total: 600
  - Density: 906.4/sq mi (349.98/km^{2})
- Time zone: UTC-6 (CST)
  - Summer (DST): UTC-5 (CDT)
- ZIP code: 61774
- Area code: 309
- FIPS code: 17-72260
- GNIS ID: 2399886
- Website: https://www.stanford-il.org/

Stanford is a village in McLean County, Illinois, United States. The population was 600 at the 2020 census. It is part of the Bloomington–Normal Metropolitan Statistical Area.

== History ==
=== The beginnings of Stanford ===
Stanford was platted, under the name of "Allin", on December 14, 1867. Its founder was John Armstrong (1820–1912). It was founded when the Jacksonville Division of the Chicago Alton and St. Louis Railroad was extended westward from Bloomington. The McLean County town of Covell was founded, within a few months of Allin, as a station on the same railroad. In 1870 the name of Allin was changed to "Stanford". It was incorporated as a village in June 1874. The town's founder, John Armstrong, was born in Posey County, Indiana. He was first a farmer and then ran a grocery in Stanford, where he continued to live until his death in 1912. For many years after the town was founded, John Armstrong ran a grocery in Stanford.

=== Original town design and development ===
The original town of what would soon become Stanford had an unusual L-shaped design, with the leg of the "L" extending to the east along the railroad tracks. The large area in the crook of the "L" was not platted, but remained in the hands of John Armstrong, the town founder, whose residence was near the tracks on the north side of the railroad. Rather than a central square, the original plat of Stanford, like many towns laid out in the 1850s and 1860s, featured two rectangular public areas labeled as "Depot Grounds" which extended along either side of the tracks. The depot itself was on the north side of the tracks and, in 1874, the grain elevator on the south side. As the town developed, most businesses were located south of the tracks. By 1895 these included a hotel, a bank, the Masonic Hall, and several stores. Except for the depot, most of the railroad-related facilities were on the depot ground south of the railroad. These included a stock yard, a lumber yard, and several elevators. This area also held a bandstand. There were two early churches in Stanford: the Christian Church on Boundary Street south of the business district and the Presbyterian Church in the southeastern part of town.

== Geography ==
Stanford is in western McLean County, 14 miles (23 km) west-southwest of Bloomington, the county seat. Illinois Route 122 passes just north of the village, leading northeast to Bloomington and west 5 miles (8 km) to Minier.

According to the U.S. Census Bureau, Stanford has a total area of 0.66 square miles (1.71 km^{2}), all land.

== Demographics ==
Historical population
Census	Pop.	Note	%±
1870	274		—
1880	353		28.8%
1890	389		10.2%
1900	601		54.5%
1910	525		−12.6%
1920	500		−4.8%
1930	443		−11.4%
1940	482		8.8%
1950	457		−5.2%
1960	479		4.8%
1970	657		37.2%
1980	720		9.6%
1990	620		−13.9%
2000	670		8.1%
2010	596		−11.0%
2020	600		0.7%
Decennial US Census

As of the census of 2000, there were 670 people, 236 households, and 190 families residing in the village. The population density was 1,749.8 inhabitants per square mile (675.6/km^{2}). There were 253 housing units at an average density of 660.8 per square mile (255.1/km^{2}). The racial makeup of the village was 97.91% White, 0.90% Native American, 0.15% Asian, and 1.04% from two or more races. Hispanic or Latino of any race were 0.90% of the population.

There were 236 households, out of which 43.6% had children under the age of 18 living with them, 62.3% were married couples living together, 14.8% had a female householder with no husband present, and 19.1% were non-families. 16.1% of all households were made up of individuals, and 7.2% had someone living alone who was 65 years of age or older. The average household size was 2.84 and the average family size was 3.14.

In the village, the population was spread out, with 29.9% under the age of 18, 10.4% from 18 to 24, 30.3% from 25 to 44, 20.3% from 45 to 64, and 9.1% who were 65 years of age or older. The median age was 33 years. For every 100 females, there were 95.3 males. For every 100 females age 18 and over, there were 88.8 males.

The median income for a household in the village was $49,375, and the median income for a family was $52,639. Males had a median income of $35,500 versus $27,813 for females. The per capita income for the village was $18,687. About 2.3% of families and 3.7% of the population were below the poverty line, including 3.1% of those under age 18 and none of those age 65 or over.

== Education ==
- Olympia High School

== Notable people ==
- Homer Caton (1887–1958), Illinois state representative and farmer
- Kelly Loeffler (born 1970), United States senator from Georgia and businesswoman
