= Atlanta, Illinois =

Atlanta
- City
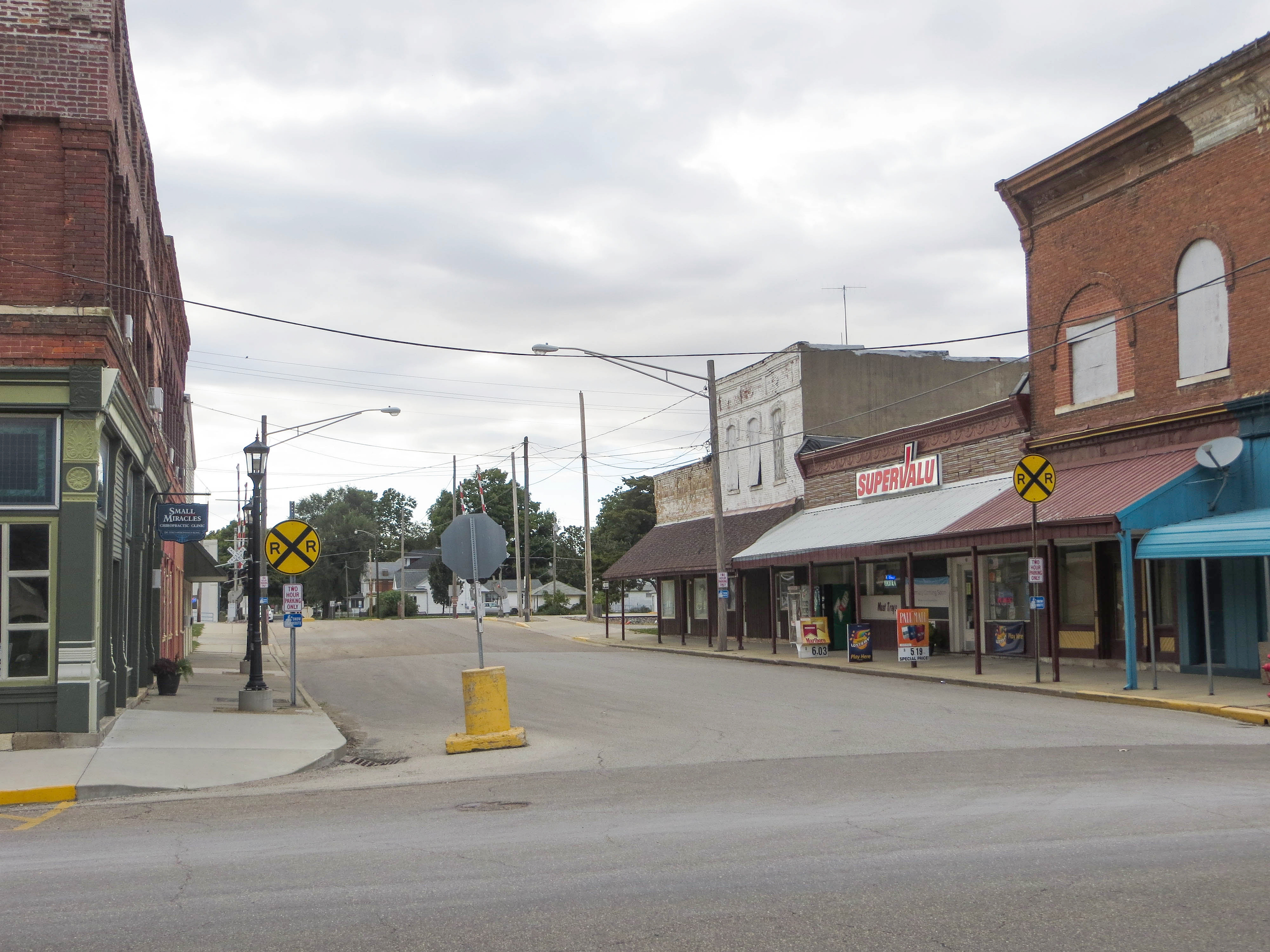
- Vine Street in Atlanta
- Motto: "Welcoming the world with a smile"
- Location of Atlanta in Logan County, Illinois.
- Coordinates: 40°15′50″N 89°13′51″W
- Country: United States
- State: Illinois
- County: Logan

Area
  - Total: 1.26 sq mi (3.26 km^{2})
  - Land: 1.25 sq mi (3.24 km^{2})
  - Water: 0.0077 sq mi (0.02 km^{2})
- Elevation: 719 ft (219 m)

Population (2020)
  - Total: 1,669
  - Density: 1,336.0/sq mi (515.85/km^{2})
- Time zone: UTC-6 (CST)
  - Summer (DST): UTC-5 (CDT)
- ZIP code: 61723
- Area code: 217
- FIPS code: 17-02752
- GNIS feature ID: 2394014
- Website: Atlanta, Illinois Website

Atlanta (formerly Xenia) is a city in Logan County, Illinois, United States. It is located along Route 66, and had a population of 1,669 at the 2020 census.

== History ==
=== Early settlement ===
In December 1836, surveyors platted the community of New Castle, located on the site of present-day Atlanta. The New Castle post office opened on November 26, 1847.

In May 1853, surveyors platted the town of Xenia, named after the town of Xenia, Ohio, the former home of an early settler's wife. The recently constructed main line of the Chicago & Alton Railroad intersected the town. As a result of being bypassed by the rail line, residents of New Castle voted to incorporate into Xenia. However, the town was unsuccessful in applying for a post office under that name, as there was already a Xenia in Clay County. In return, settlers moved to name the town Hamilton, after Colonel L. D. Hamilton, a Hamilton existed in Hancock County by this point. Finally, the name Atlanta was agreed upon, named after the city of Atlanta in Georgia. With no other Illinois towns by that name, the change was approved. By October 20 of that same year, the post office was renamed to the misspelled Atalanta. This error would be fixed on March 4, 1861, with the correctly spelled "Atlanta". The community of Atlanta was incorporated by the Illinois General Assembly on February 14, 1855.

In 1869, the Peoria, Atlanta and Decatur Railroad was first surveyed. Work commenced the following year, and the line was completed by November 1874.

== Geography ==
According to the 2021 census gazetteer files, Atlanta has a total area of 1.26 square miles (3.26 km^{2}), of which 1.25 square miles (3.24 km^{2}) (or 99.36%) is land and 0.01 square miles (0.03 km^{2}) (or 0.64%) is water.

== Demographics ==
=== 2020 census ===
As of the 2020 census there were 1,669 people, 846 households, and 607 families residing in the city. The population density was 1,327.76 inhabitants per square mile (512.65/km^{2}). There were 769 housing units at an average density of 611.77 per square mile (236.21/km^{2}). The racial makeup of the city was 94.43% White, 0.30% African American, 0.18% Native American, 0.24% Asian, 0.00% Pacific Islander, 0.42% from other races, and 4.43% from two or more races. Hispanic or Latino of any race were 2.10% of the population.

There were 846 households, out of which 33.8% had children under the age of 18 living with them, 51.77% were married couples living together, 18.68% had a female householder with no husband present, and 28.25% were non-families. 22.58% of all households were made up of individuals, and 9.93% had someone living alone who was 65 years of age or older. The average household size was 2.97 and the average family size was 2.54.

The city's age distribution consisted of 27.8% under the age of 18, 12.7% from 18 to 24, 23% from 25 to 44, 21.9% from 45 to 64, and 14.4% who were 65 years of age or older. The median age was 35.5 years. For every 100 females, there were 92.7 males. For every 100 females age 18 and over, there were 98.5 males.

The median income for a household in the city was $55,694, and the median income for a family was $67,125. Males had a median income of $47,128 versus $25,521 for females. The per capita income for the city was $24,863. About 11.2% of families and 14.8% of the population were below the poverty line, including 24.0% of those under age 18 and 3.9% of those age 65 or over.

There were 769 housing units, of which 8.7% were vacant. The homeowner vacancy rate was 3.3% and the rental vacancy rate was 5.3%.

Racial composition as of the 2020 census
Race	Number	Percent
White	1,576	94.4%
Black or African American	5	0.3%
American Indian and Alaska Native	3	0.2%
Asian	4	0.2%
Native Hawaiian and Other Pacific Islander	0	0.0%
Some other race	7	0.4%
Two or more races	74	4.4%
Hispanic or Latino (of any race)	35	2.1%

== Culture ==
Atlanta's motto is "Welcoming the world with a smile". The city's water tower has had a smiley face on it since 2003, when it was painted at the request of alderwoman Billie Cheek.

=== Media ===
In May 1869, the Atlanta Argus was established by Albion Smith, to this point the second newspaper printed in Logan County. The newspaper ran alone until 1964, when it merged with The Armington Helper of nearby Armington in Tazewell County. The new Atlanta Argus and The Armington Helper ran until the paper was disbanded in 1983.

The town is home to the WLCN radio station, which broadcasts in a country music format.

== Education ==
Atlanta Public Schools are part of the Olympia Community Unit School District 16. Students attend Olympia High School.

The town, along with the majority of Logan County, is located within the boundaries of the community college district of Heartland Community College in Normal.

== Notable people ==
- Jeremiah D. Botkin, U.S. Congressman
- Paul Callaway, organist and conductor
- Ellen Rankin Copp, sculptor
- Lee Dunham, baseball player
- Tom Ewing, politician
- Lester C. Hunt, politician
- Dave Kindred, sportswriter
- Eleanor Sophia Smith, composer and music educator
