= Glandon, Wisconsin =

Unincorporated community in Wisconsin, United States

- Unincorporated community
- Location within Wisconsin Location within the United States
- Coordinates: 45°05′20″N 89°25′37″W
- Country: United States
- State: Wisconsin
- County: Marathon
- Elevation: 1,460 ft (450 m)
- Time zone: UTC-6 (Central (CST))
  - Summer (DST): UTC-5 (CDT)
- Area codes: 715 & 534
- GNIS feature ID: 1577613

Glandon is an unincorporated community located in the town of Hewitt, Marathon County, Wisconsin, United States. Glandon is located at the junction of County Highways G and Q, 13.5 miles (21.7 km) northeast of Wausau. William C. Landon founded the community's post office in 1908. He named the community after either his father or son who are both named G. Landon.
