= Hewitt, Marathon County, Wisconsin =

Town in Wisconsin, United States of America

Hewitt, Wisconsin
- Town
- Town of Hewitt
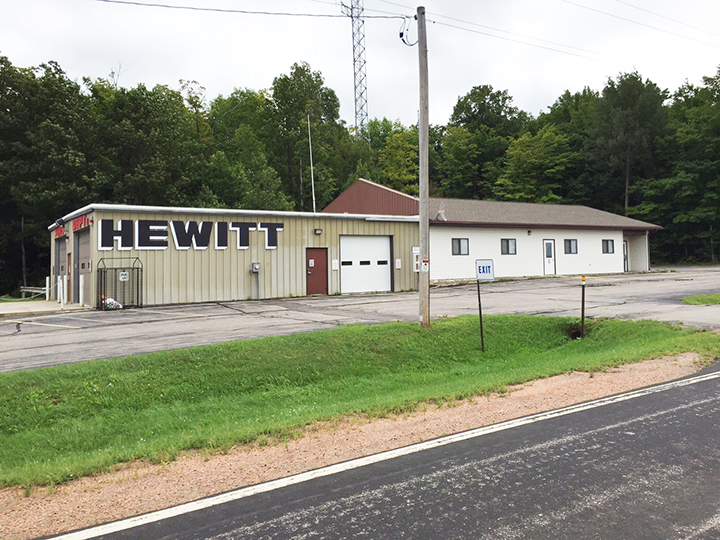
- Town Hall

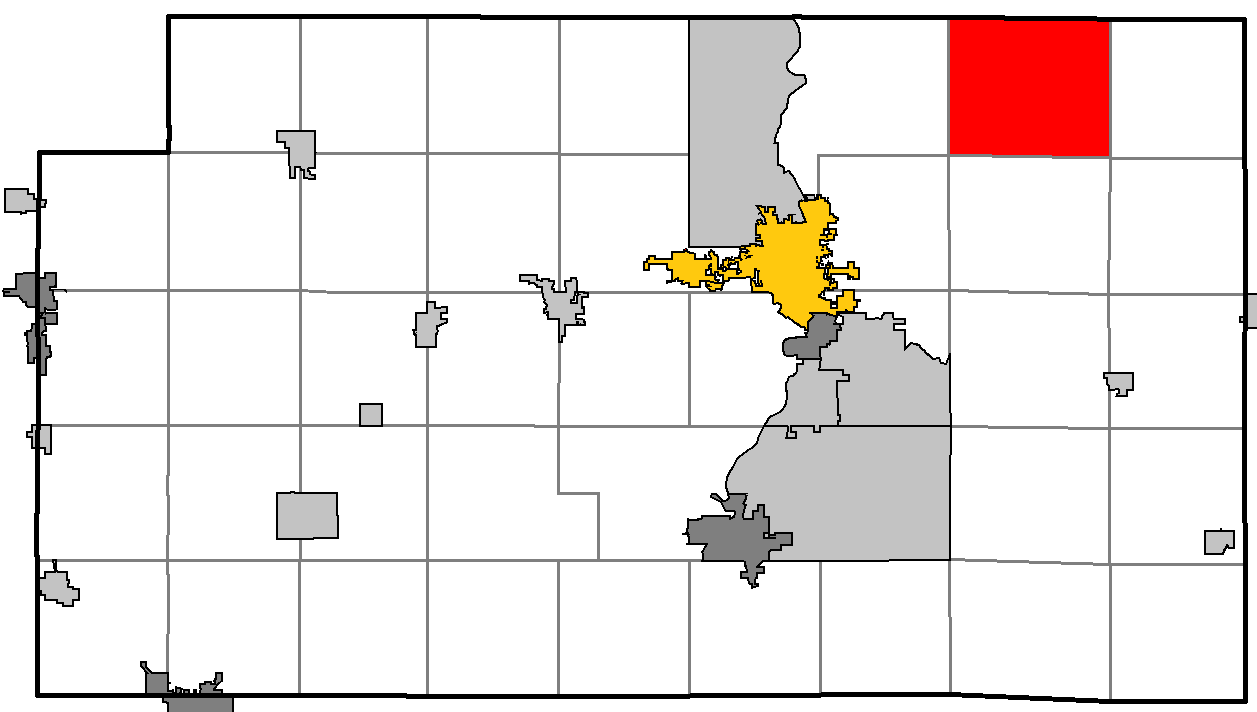
- Location of Hewitt, Marathon County

- Location of Marathon County, Wisconsin
- Coordinates: 45°04′31″N 89°25′08″W
- Country: United States
- State: Wisconsin
- County: Marathon

Area
  - Total: 43.48 sq mi (112.6 km^{2})
  - Land: 43.48 sq mi (112.6 km^{2})
  - Water: 0 sq mi (0 km^{2})

Population (2020)
  - Total: 636
  - Density: 14.6/sq mi (5.65/km^{2})
- Time zone: UTC-6 (Central (CST))
  - Summer (DST): UTC-5 (CDT)
- Area code(s): 715 and 534
- GNIS feature ID: 1583383
- Website: https://townofhewitt.wi.gov/

Hewitt is a town in Marathon County, Wisconsin, United States, founded in 1894. It is part of the Wausau, Wisconsin Metropolitan Statistical Area. The population was 636 at the 2020 census. The unincorporated community of Glandon is located in the town.

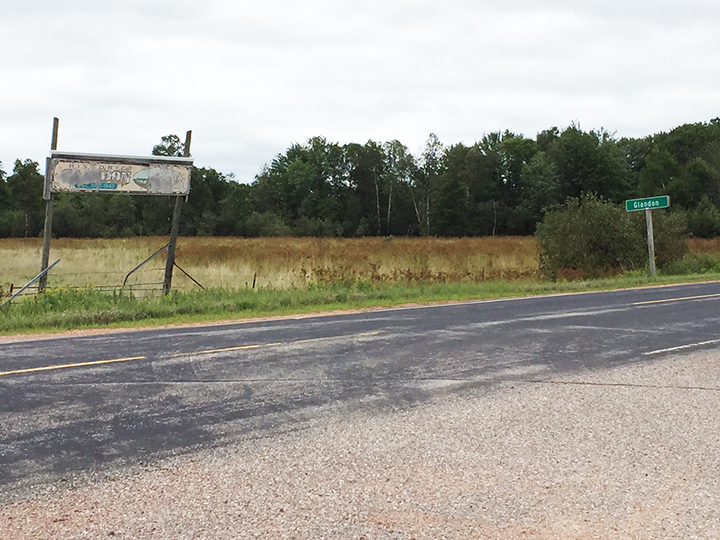
Glandon – unincorporated community, Town of Hewitt.

== Geography ==
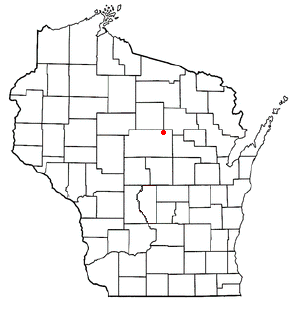
Location of xxx, Wisconsin

According to the United States Census Bureau, the town has a total area of 43.4 square miles (112.4 km^{2}), all land.

== Demographics ==
At the 2000 census there were 545 people, 195 households, and 158 families living in the town. The population density was 12.6 people per square mile (4.8/km^{2}). There were 208 housing units at an average density of 4.8 per square mile (1.9/km^{2}). The racial makeup of the town was 98.90% White, 0.18% African American, 0.18% from other races, and 0.73% from two or more races. Hispanic or Latino of any race were 0.18%.

Of the 195 households 32.8% had children under the age of 18 living with them, 72.3% were married couples living together, 3.6% had a female householder with no husband present, and 18.5% were non-families. 13.3% of households were one person and 6.2% were one person aged 65 or older. The average household size was 2.79 and the average family size was 3.06.

The age distribution was 24.8% under the age of 18, 7.2% from 18 to 24, 30.6% from 25 to 44, 26.1% from 45 to 64, and 11.4% 65 or older. The median age was 39 years. For every 100 females, there were 114.6 males. For every 100 females age 18 and over, there were 108.1 males.

The median household income was $51,042 and the median family income was $55,000. Males had a median income of $33,214 versus $26,591 for females. The per capita income for the town was $20,155. About 2.9% of families and 2.4% of the population were below the poverty line, including none of those under age 18 and 8.2% of those age 65 or over.
