= Waynesville, Illinois =

Waynesville
- Village
- Location of Waynesville in Witt County, Illinois.

- Location of Illinois in the United States
- Coordinates: 40°14′29″N 89°7′30″W
- Country: United States
- State: Illinois
- County: DeWitt

Area
  - Total: 0.32 sq mi (0.83 km^{2})
  - Land: 0.32 sq mi (0.83 km^{2})
  - Water: 0 sq mi (0.00 km^{2})
- Elevation: 725 ft (221 m)

Population (2020)
  - Total: 381
  - Density: 1,195/sq mi (461.5/km^{2})
- Time zone: UTC-6 (CST)
  - Summer (DST): UTC-5 (CDT)
- ZIP Code(s): 61778
- Area code: 217
- FIPS code: 17-79449
- GNIS feature ID: 2400118
- Wikimedia Commons: Waynesville, Illinois
- Website: waynesvillevillage.com

Waynesville is a village in DeWitt County, Illinois, United States. The population was 381 at the 2020 census.

== History ==
Waynesville is one of the oldest settlements in central Illinois. The area was first settled around 1825, by Prettyman Marvel and his wife, Rebecca (Barr) Marvel. They cleared an area of land near the present location of the village and were followed shortly thereafter by several other settlers. As a result, a small settlement sprung up about a mile south of Kickapoo Creek.

In 1832, the first plats for the village were filed, and the name "Waynesville" (after the hero of the Revolutionary War, General Anthony Wayne) was selected. Town lots were auctioned off, and the sale announced in newspapers. However, economic circumstances meant that few lots were ever built upon. Within two or three decades, the village had reached a population of about 500, a figure where it would remain almost until the present.

Sadly, Waynesville, although one of the first villages in the area, never became a prominent one. When the new county of Dewitt was established in 1839, Waynesville found itself at the far northwest corner, and thus out of the running for county seat. As well, influential politicians in Bloomington and Clinton managed to have the Illinois Central Railroad routed through those cities and bypassing Waynesville. Finally, when the system of state highways was laid out, the village was once again bypassed.

In 1855, Waynesville suffered a cholera outbreak that killed some 50 out of the village's 150 residents: one of the worst outbreaks of the disease in central Illinois.

Waynesville is a shrinking settlement, as people move away and residents die. It no longer has a school of its own, and many of the buildings in its "uptown" business district have succumbed to the ravages of time.

== Geography ==
According to the 2010 census, Waynesville has a total area of 0.32 square miles (0.83 km^{2}), all land.

== Demographics ==
Historical population
Census	Pop.	Note	%±
1850	322		—
1880	200		—
1890	368		84.0%
1900	528		43.5%
1910	546		3.4%
1920	592		8.4%
1930	511		−13.7%
1940	564		10.4%
1950	516		−8.5%
1960	510		−1.2%
1970	522		2.4%
1980	569		9.0%
1990	440		−22.7%
2000	452		2.7%
2010	434		−4.0%
2020	381		−12.2%
U.S. Decennial Census

As of the 2020 census there were 381 people, 206 households, and 128 families residing in the village. The population density was 1,194.36 inhabitants per square mile (461.14/km^{2}). There were 194 housing units at an average density of 608.15 per square mile (234.81/km^{2}). The racial makeup of the village was 92.65% White, 0.52% African American, 0.52% Native American, 0.26% Asian, 1.05% from other races, and 4.99% from two or more races. Hispanic or Latino of any race were 1.84% of the population.

There were 206 households, out of which 24.3% had children under the age of 18 living with them, 55.34% were married couples living together, 3.40% had a female householder with no husband present, and 37.86% were non-families. 28.64% of all households were made up of individuals, and 11.65% had someone living alone who was 65 years of age or older. The average household size was 2.81 and the average family size was 2.41.

The village's age distribution consisted of 19.6% under the age of 18, 6.5% from 18 to 24, 31% from 25 to 44, 26.7% from 45 to 64, and 16.1% who were 65 years of age or older. The median age was 36.8 years. For every 100 females, there were 102.4 males. For every 100 females age 18 and over, there were 108.9 males.

The median income for a household in the village was $66,000, and the median income for a family was $84,167. Males had a median income of $42,273 versus $43,750 for females. The per capita income for the village was $32,975. About 3.9% of families and 8.6% of the population were below the poverty line, including 4.5% of those under age 18 and 5.0% of those age 65 or over.

== Education ==
The school district is Olympia Community Unit School District 16.
