= Allin Township, McLean County, Illinois =

Allin Township
- Township
- Location in McLean County

- McLean County's location in Illinois
- Country: United States
- State: Illinois
- County: McLean
- Established: March 4, 1867

Area
  - Total: 36.25 sq mi (93.9 km^{2})
  - Land: 36.25 sq mi (93.9 km^{2})
  - Water: 0 sq mi (0 km^{2}) 0%

Population (2010)
  - Estimate (2016): 899
  - Density: 25.4/sq mi (9.8/km^{2})
- Time zone: UTC-6 (CST)
  - Summer (DST): UTC-5 (CDT)
- FIPS code: 17-113-00893

Allin Township is located in McLean County, Illinois. As of the 2010 census, its population was 919 and it contained 389 housing units. Allin Township was originally named Mosquito Grove Township, but changed its name on March 4, 1867. The township bears the name of James Allin, a promoter of Bloomington, Illinois.

== Geography ==
According to the 2010 census, the township has a total area of 36.25 square miles (93.9 km^{2}), all land.

== Demographics ==
Historical population
Census	Pop.	Note	%±
2016 (est.)	899
U.S. Decennial Census
