= Danvers, Illinois =

Danvers, Illinois Concord
- Village
- Location in McLean County, Illinois
- Coordinates: 40°31′48″N 89°10′30″W
- Country: United States
- State: Illinois
- County: McLean
- Township: Danvers
- Founded: 1836

Area
  - Total: 0.80 sq mi (2.08 km^{2})
  - Land: 0.80 sq mi (2.08 km^{2})
  - Water: 0 sq mi (0.00 km^{2})
- Elevation: 807 ft (246 m)

Population (2020)
  - Total: 1,089
  - Density: 1,355.4/sq mi (523.31/km^{2})
- Time zone: UTC-6 (CST)
  - Summer (DST): UTC-5 (CDT)
- ZIP code: 61732
- Area code: 309
- FIPS code: 17-18537
- GNIS ID: 2398681
- Website: danversil.com

Danvers is a village in McLean County, Illinois, United States. The population was 1,089 as of the 2020 census. It is part of the Bloomington–Normal Metropolitan Statistical Area.

== History ==
=== Origin ===
Danvers was laid out under the name of "Concord" on February 20, 1836, by Israel W. Hall (1799 - 1865) and Matthew Robb (1801 – 1870). The name Concord was given to the town by Hall after Concord, Massachusetts. A rival town, Wilkesborough, just over a mile to the east, was laid out by James O. Barnard on June 3 of the same year. Wilkesborough had 96 lots and a public square. Both towns were part of the great town founding surge in Illinois that peaked in 1836. Between 1835 and 1837 eight new towns and many additions were laid out in McLean County. At this time it was fairly common for two towns to be founded close to each other as they competed for the same locational advantage. In this case both towns were on the stage route from Bloomington to Peoria and Pekin. For several years it was unclear which town would be successful. Wilkesborough did quite well and by 1859 had 15 heads of family, but Concord had three times that number. Eventually it became clear that Concord would was the more successful place, but the people of Concord had to go to Wilkesborough to get their mail. By the late 1870s Wilkesborough had completely vanished.

=== Original design ===
Like many other new places laid out in the 1830s, the original plan of the new town was designed around a central public square. However, unlike most such places (for example, Lexington and LeRoy), the plat used at Concord showed with dashed lines how the streets which entered the public square midway along each side could be extended to meet at the center of the square. In effect, this unusual feature of the plan made it possible to subdivide the square into four smaller rectangles. This was soon done. One of these rectangles has always been a park, but the other three have been put to different civic uses, including locations for the library, fire station, water tower, and school gymnasium.

=== Early growth and change of name ===
The early growth of Danvers was extremely slow. Although both Hall and Robb lived in the area, neither was a resident of the town. The first building in Concord was erected in 1837 by Nicholas Conger, but Conger himself does not seem to have lived there. The first actual resident was Asa Rankin. Eventually a small mill was erected by Hobson and Havens. In the words of the 1879 county history, "For more than six years the place was nearly lifeless." In 1848 or 1849 a post office was established in Concord. Most of the early rural settlement around the new town was near Stout's Grove, which began just west of Concord, and for the first twenty years of the town's life the prairie to the north, east and south was used mainly as open grazing land.

In 1836 Illinois had no way of regulating town names and popular names were frequently repeated. There were at least two other places in Illinois named Concord. Therefore, in 1861, the name of the town was changed to Danvers. The new name was taken from the town of Danvers in Essex County, Massachusetts. During the late 1840s and early 1850s the town grew more rapidly. Danvers was incorporated as a village under a special charter on May 7, 1869.

=== Railroads and inter-urbans ===
In the late 1850s and 1860s, farmers began moving into the prairies around the newly renamed town, which became the center of an exceptionally productive agricultural district. It became clear that if Danvers was going to ship grain, a railroad was essential. In the 1850s the Illinois Central and the Chicago and Alton railroads had both passed through McLean County, but neither came close to Danvers. A town meeting was held and it was decided that Danvers would subscribe to $50,000 in railroad bonds. Many other communities in the state were taking similar action, something most of them came to regret: the bonds were quickly sold in Europe or the East, and the taxpayers of towns and townships were forced to pay for railroads that often provided indifferent service.

On November 25, 1869, a celebration was held in Danvers to hail the arrival of the first train. A great public picnic was held, and large amounts of chicken, oysters and coffee were consumed. Scheduled rail service would continue until December 1982, and the last special train stopped in Danvers in August 1984. In 1907 Danvers also became a stop on the electric interurban railroad. These tracks were laid along Exchange Street and passed through the center of the town. The Illinois Traction System operated long after similar electric railroads in other areas had closed. In 1942 the interurban tracks were threatened when the government scoured the country for surplus metal for war needs, but citizens protested that the electric railroad was vital to local people and saved great amounts of gasoline. Service on the interurban finally ended on February 21, 1953.

=== Later years ===
In 1870 the population of Danvers was 356. By 1900 it had climbed to 607 and by 1950 to 762. By 2000 it was over 1,100, meaning that unlike many similar places, the town had grown more rapidly than at any earlier period. Much of this increase in population was due to a substantial number of people who found the town a pleasant residential base when working in Bloomington-Normal or Peoria.

In the late nineteenth and twentieth centuries, Danvers was the home of Dr. F. J. Parkhurst's distinctive alcohol treatment facility, the Willow Bark Institute. Beginning in 1880 the doctor sought to treat addiction to strong spirits by administering small amounts of alcohol, followed by a stiff dose of foul-tasting willow-bark extract. Parkhurst's facility operated until about 1920 and was revived by others from 1935 to the early 1950s.

Danvers was also distinctive for its drift gas wells. During the last glacial epoch, vegetation was buried by ice-carried soil. Its decay produced gas that could be tapped in shallow wells and used for some domestic purposes. At one time there were more than seventy such wells in the Danvers area.

The village is currently home to a cooperative grain elevator, two bars, a bank, and a gas station.

== Geography ==
Danvers is in western McLean County, 11 miles (18 km) northwest of Bloomington, the county seat. Illinois Route 9 passes just south of the village, leading southeast 6 miles (10 km) to Twin Grove and then on to Bloomington, and west 10 miles (16 km) to Mackinaw.

According to the U.S. Census Bureau, Danvers has a total area of 0.80 square miles (2.07 km^{2}), all land. It drains northwest toward the West Fork of Sugar Creek, a southwest-flowing stream within the Sangamon River watershed.

== Demographics ==
Historical population
Census	Pop.	Note	%±
1870	356		—
1880	460		29.2%
1890	506		10.0%
1900	607		20.0%
1910	593		−2.3%
1920	616		3.9%
1930	601		−2.4%
1940	705		17.3%
1950	762		8.1%
1960	783		2.8%
1970	854		9.1%
1980	921		7.8%
1990	981		6.5%
2000	1,183		20.6%
2010	1,154		−2.5%
2020	1,089		−5.6%
Decennial US Census

=== 2020 census ===
As of the 2020 census, Danvers had a population of 1,089. The median age was 36.4 years. 27.4% of residents were under the age of 18 and 12.1% of residents were 65 years of age or older. For every 100 females there were 92.1 males, and for every 100 females age 18 and over there were 93.4 males age 18 and over.

0.0% of residents lived in urban areas, while 100.0% lived in rural areas.

There were 424 households in Danvers, of which 36.6% had children under the age of 18 living in them. Of all households, 57.3% were married-couple households, 16.7% were households with a male householder and no spouse or partner present, and 21.2% were households with a female householder and no spouse or partner present. About 25.9% of all households were made up of individuals and 8.0% had someone living alone who was 65 years of age or older.

There were 448 housing units, of which 5.4% were vacant. The homeowner vacancy rate was 0.6% and the rental vacancy rate was 3.9%.

Racial composition as of the 2020 census
Race	Number	Percent
White	1,009	92.7%
Black or African American	2	0.2%
American Indian and Alaska Native	1	0.1%
Asian	3	0.3%
Native Hawaiian and Other Pacific Islander	0	0.0%
Some other race	13	1.2%
Two or more races	61	5.6%
Hispanic or Latino (of any race)	26	2.4%

=== 2000 census ===
As of the census of 2000, there were 1,183 people, 426 households, and 328 families residing in the village. The population density was 1,368.6 inhabitants per square mile (528.4/km^{2}). There were 453 housing units at an average density of 524.1 per square mile (202.4/km^{2}). The racial makeup of the village was 97.89% White, 0.93% African American, 0.34% Native American, 0.08% Pacific Islander, 0.17% from other races, and 0.59% from two or more races. Hispanic or Latino of any race were 0.76% of the population.

There were 426 households, out of which 45.1% had children under the age of 18 living with them, 66.4% were married couples living together, 8.7% had a female householder with no husband present, and 22.8% were non-families. 19.2% of all households were made up of individuals, and 8.5% had someone living alone who was 65 years of age or older. The average household size was 2.78 and the average family size was 3.19.

In the village, the population was spread out, with 32.3% under the age of 18, 6.6% from 18 to 24, 34.4% from 25 to 44, 17.9% from 45 to 64, and 8.8% who were 65 years of age or older. The median age was 32 years. For every 100 females, there were 96.5 males. For every 100 females age 18 and over, there were 93.0 males.

The median income for a household in the village was $52,647, and the median income for a family was $58,355. Males had a median income of $41,927 versus $28,098 for females. The per capita income for the village was $19,598. About 5.0% of families and 6.5% of the population were below the poverty line, including 8.4% of those under age 18 and 11.1% of those age 65 or over.

== Education ==
The school district is Olympia Community Unit School District 16.

Olympia North Elementary School is on the east side of the village. The building replaced the previous Danvers Elementary School in 2009.
