= Danvers Township, McLean County, Illinois =

Coordinates: 40°31′51″N 89°11′27″W

Danvers Township
- Township
- Location in McLean County

- McLean County's location in Illinois
- Country: United States
- State: Illinois
- County: McLean
- Established: November 3, 1857

Area
  - Total: 45.15 sq mi (116.9 km^{2})
  - Land: 45.1 sq mi (117 km^{2})
  - Water: 0.05 sq mi (0.13 km^{2}) 0.11%

Population (2010)
  - Estimate (2016): 1,898
  - Density: 42.7/sq mi (16.5/km^{2})
- Time zone: UTC-6 (CST)
  - Summer (DST): UTC-5 (CDT)
- FIPS code: 17-113-18550

Danvers Township is located in McLean County, Illinois. As of the 2010 census, its population was 1,925 and it contained 757 housing units.

== History ==
Danvers Township was named after Danvers, Massachusetts.

== Geography ==
According to the 2010 census, the township has a total area of 45.15 square miles (116.9 km^{2}), of which 45.1 square miles (117 km^{2}) (or 99.89%) is land and 0.05 square miles (0.13 km^{2}) (or 0.11%) is water.

== Demographics ==
Historical population
Census	Pop.	Note	%±
2016 (est.)	1,898
U.S. Decennial Census
