= Mount Hope Township, McLean County, Illinois =

Coordinates: 40°20′35″N 89°11′59″W

Mount Hope Township
- Township
- Location in McLean County

- McLean County's location in Illinois
- Country: United States
- State: Illinois
- County: McLean
- Established: November 3, 1857

Area
  - Total: 48.79 sq mi (126.4 km^{2})
  - Land: 48.77 sq mi (126.3 km^{2})
  - Water: 0.02 sq mi (0.052 km^{2}) 0.04%

Population (2010)
  - Estimate (2016): 1,076
  - Density: 22.6/sq mi (8.7/km^{2})
- Time zone: UTC-6 (CST)
  - Summer (DST): UTC-5 (CDT)
- FIPS code: 17-113-50972

Mount Hope Township is located in McLean County, Illinois. As of the 2010 census, its population was 1,103 and it contained 455 housing units.

== Geography ==
According to the 2010 census, the township has a total area of 48.79 square miles (126.4 km^{2}), of which 48.77 square miles (126.3 km^{2}) (or 99.96%) is land and 0.02 square miles (0.052 km^{2}) (or 0.04%) is water.

== Demographics ==
Historical population
| Census | Pop. | Note | %± |
|---|---|---|---|
| 2016 (est.) | 1,076 |
U.S. Decennial Census

Based on the 2024-25 census, the media age in Mount Hope Township is 36.8 and 90% of the population is classified as White.
