= WLCN (FM) =

Coordinates: 40.2442°N 89.2643°W

- Atlanta, Illinois; United States
- Frequency: 96.3 MHz
- Branding: 96✷3 Lincoln Country

Programming
- Format: Today's Best Country
- Affiliations: AP News

Ownership
- Owner: KM Communications

History
- Former call signs: WMNW
- Call sign meaning: reference to nearby Lincoln, Illinois

Technical information
- Licensing authority: FCC
- Facility ID: 82090
- Class: A
- ERP: 6,000 watts
- HAAT: 81 meters (266 ft)

Links
- Public license information: Public file; LMS
- Website: wlcnonline.com

WLCN (96.3 MHz) is an FM radio station based in Atlanta, Illinois. Its morning show is hosted by Jim Ash. Jeff Maxwell hosts the classic rock experience every night from six to midnight. The format of the station is country music. The LCN is intended to be a reference to nearby Lincoln, Illinois. The station's power is 6,000 watts effective radiated power. The station used to be WMNW playing classic rock. WLCN is the flagship station for Lincoln Community High School football and basketball games.
