= Armington, Illinois =

Armington
- Village
- Location of Armington in Tazewell County, Illinois.
- Coordinates: 40°20′23″N 89°18′52″W
- Country: United States
- State: Illinois
- County: Tazewell

Area
  - Total: 0.29 sq mi (0.74 km^{2})
  - Land: 0.29 sq mi (0.74 km^{2})
  - Water: 0 sq mi (0.00 km^{2})
- Elevation: 627 ft (191 m)

Population (2020)
  - Total: 310
  - Density: 1,088.3/sq mi (420.19/km^{2})
- Time zone: UTC-6 (CST)
  - Summer (DST): UTC-5 (CDT)
- ZIP code: 61721
- Area code: 309
- FIPS code: 17-02206
- GNIS feature ID: 2397988

Armington is a village in Tazewell County, Illinois, United States. As of the 2020 census, Armington had a population of 310. It is part of the Peoria, Illinois Metropolitan Statistical Area.

== Geography ==
According to the 2010 census, Armington has a total area of 0.29 square miles (0.75 km^{2}), all land.

== Demographics ==
Historical population
Census	Pop.	Note	%±
1880	129		—
1890	241		86.8%
1910	327		—
1920	368		12.5%
1930	315		−14.4%
1940	299		−5.1%
1950	314		5.0%
1960	327		4.1%
1970	368		12.5%
1980	297		−19.3%
1990	348		17.2%
2000	368		5.7%
2010	343		−6.8%
2020	310		−9.6%
U.S. Decennial Census

As of the census of 2000, there were 368 people, 135 households, and 98 families residing in the village. The population density was 1,283.7 inhabitants per square mile (495.6/km^{2}). There were 152 housing units at an average density of 530.2 per square mile (204.7/km^{2}). The racial makeup of the village was 99.46% White, and 0.54% from two or more races. Hispanic or Latino of any race were 2.72% of the population.

There were 135 households, out of which 39.3% had children under the age of 18 living with them, 65.2% were married couples living together, 6.7% had a female householder with no husband present, and 26.7% were non-families. 25.2% of all households were made up of individuals, and 11.9% had someone living alone who was 65 years of age or older. The average household size was 2.73 and the average family size was 3.27.

In the village, the population was spread out, with 34.0% under the age of 18, 3.0% from 18 to 24, 33.4% from 25 to 44, 20.4% from 45 to 64, and 9.2% who were 65 years of age or older. The median age was 33 years. For every 100 females, there were 102.2 males. For every 100 females age 18 and over, there were 96.0 males.

The median income for a household in the village was $39,583, and the median income for a family was $47,708. Males had a median income of $39,306 versus $24,167 for females. The per capita income for the village was $17,866. About 3.1% of families and 8.0% of the population were below the poverty line, including 10.3% of those under age 18 and 5.3% of those age 65 or over.

== Education ==
The school district is Olympia Community Unit School District 16.
