= Hopedale, Illinois =

Hopedale
- Village
- Location of Hopedale in Tazewell County, Illinois.
- Coordinates: 40°25′24″N 89°25′18″W
- Country: United States
- State: Illinois
- County: Tazewell

Area
  - Total: 0.88 sq mi (2.29 km^{2})
  - Land: 0.88 sq mi (2.28 km^{2})
  - Water: 0.0039 sq mi (0.01 km^{2})
- Elevation: 633 ft (193 m)

Population (2020)
  - Total: 830
  - Density: 940.8/sq mi (363.24/km^{2})
- Time zone: UTC-6 (CST)
  - Summer (DST): UTC-5 (CDT)
- ZIP code: 61747
- Area code: 309
- FIPS code: 17-36126
- GNIS feature ID: 2398541
- Website: villageofhopedale.com

Hopedale is a village in Tazewell County, Illinois, United States. The population was 830 at the 2020 census. It is part of the Peoria, Illinois Metropolitan Statistical Area. The town is also home to a small number of restaurants, general stores, parks, and the Hopedale Medical Complex.

== Geography ==
According to the 2010 census, Hopedale has a total area of 0.504 square miles (1.31 km^{2}), of which 0.5 square miles (1.29 km^{2}) (or 99.21%) is land and 0.004 square miles (0.01 km^{2}) (or 0.79%) is water.

== Demographics ==
Historical population
| Census | Pop. | Note | %± |
|---|---|---|---|
| 1880 | 362 | | — |
| 1890 | 471 | | 30.1% |
| 1900 | 600 | | 27.4% |
| 1910 | 586 | | −2.3% |
| 1920 | 556 | | −5.1% |
| 1930 | 498 | | −10.4% |
| 1940 | 545 | | 9.4% |
| 1950 | 574 | | 5.3% |
| 1960 | 737 | | 28.4% |
| 1970 | 923 | | 25.2% |
| 1980 | 913 | | −1.1% |
| 1990 | 805 | | −11.8% |
| 2000 | 925 | | 14.9% |
| 2010 | 865 | | −6.5% |
| 2020 | 830 | | −4.0% |
U.S. Decennial Census

As of the census of 2000, there were 929 people, 322 households, and 228 families residing in the village. The population density was 1,729.8 inhabitants per square mile (667.9/km^{2}). There were 349 housing units at an average density of 649.8 per square mile (250.9/km^{2}). The racial makeup of the village was 99.78% White, and 0.22% from two or more races. Hispanic or Latino of any race were 0.11% of the population.

There were 322 households, out of which 30.7% had children under the age of 18 living with them, 60.2% were married couples living together, 6.8% had a female householder with no husband present, and 28.9% were non-families. 24.2% of all households were made up of individuals, and 12.1% had someone living alone who was 65 years of age or older. The average household size was 2.52 and the average family size was 3.01.

In the village, the population was spread out, with 21.1% under the age of 18, 7.6% from 18 to 24, 24.1% from 25 to 44, 17.2% from 45 to 64, and 29.9% who were 65 years of age or older. The median age was 42 years. For every 100 females, there were 86.2 males. For every 100 females age 18 and over, there were 80.1 males.

The median income for a household in the village was $37,596, and the median income for a family was $42,625. Males had a median income of $37,188 versus $23,750 for females. The per capita income for the village was $17,784. About 3.8% of families and 6.4% of the population were below the poverty line, including 4.6% of those under age 18 and 6.1% of those age 65 or over.

The estimated population in July 2006 is 919, with a decrease of 1.1%.

== Education ==
The school district is Olympia Community Unit School District 16.
