= Minier, Illinois =

Minier
- Village
- Location of Minier in Tazewell County, Illinois.
- Coordinates: 40°26′01″N 89°18′50″W
- Country: United States
- State: Illinois
- County: Tazewell
- Founded: 1866
- Founded by: George Washington Minier

Government
  - Village President: Nathan Fosdick

Area
  - Total: 0.58 sq mi (1.49 km^{2})
  - Land: 0.58 sq mi (1.49 km^{2})
  - Water: 0 sq mi (0.00 km^{2})
- Elevation: 637 ft (194 m)

Population (2020)
  - Total: 1,154
  - Estimate (2024): 1,137
  - Density: 2,007/sq mi (774.9/km^{2})
- Time zone: UTC-6 (CST)
  - Summer (DST): UTC-5 (CDT)
- ZIP code: 61759
- Area code: 309
- FIPS code: 17-49555
- GNIS feature ID: 2399375
- Website: minier.com

Minier is a village in Tazewell County, Illinois, United States. The population was 1,154 at the 2020 census. Minier is part of the Peoria, Illinois Metropolitan Statistical Area.

== History ==
Minier was founded in 1866 and named for its founder, George Washington Minier, a friend of Abraham Lincoln's, at the crossroads of the Chicago and Alton Railroad and the Illinois and Midland Railroad. It was named Broadway at its founding in 1866 before being renamed to Minier on November 26, 1867.

== Geography ==
According to the 2010 census, Minier has a total area of 0.62 square miles (1.61 km^{2}), all land.

== Demographics ==
Historical population
Census	Pop.	Note	%±
1880	600		—
1890	664		10.7%
1900	746		12.3%
1910	690		−7.5%
1920	789		14.3%
1930	726		−8.0%
1940	737		1.5%
1950	780		5.8%
1960	847		8.6%
1970	986		16.4%
1980	1,261		27.9%
1990	1,155		−8.4%
2000	1,244		7.7%
2010	1,252		0.6%
2020	1,154		−7.8%
U.S. Decennial Census

=== 2020 census ===
As of the 2020 census, Minier had a population of 1,154. The median age was 42.9 years. 21.8% of residents were under the age of 18 and 20.5% of residents were 65 years of age or older. For every 100 females there were 99.3 males, and for every 100 females age 18 and over there were 95.0 males age 18 and over.

0.0% of residents lived in urban areas, while 100.0% lived in rural areas.

There were 496 households in Minier, of which 28.2% had children under the age of 18 living in them. Of all households, 51.2% were married-couple households, 18.3% were households with a male householder and no spouse or partner present, and 26.0% were households with a female householder and no spouse or partner present. About 29.8% of all households were made up of individuals and 11.1% had someone living alone who was 65 years of age or older.

There were 540 housing units, of which 8.1% were vacant. The homeowner vacancy rate was 1.2% and the rental vacancy rate was 10.3%.

Racial composition as of the 2020 census
Race	Number	Percent
White	1,085	94.0%
Black or African American	4	0.3%
American Indian and Alaska Native	3	0.3%
Asian	4	0.3%
Native Hawaiian and Other Pacific Islander	0	0.0%
Some other race	3	0.3%
Two or more races	55	4.8%
Hispanic or Latino (of any race)	23	2.0%

=== 2000 census ===
As of the census of 2000, there were 1,244 people, 507 households, and 360 families residing in the village. The population density was 1,991.2 inhabitants per square mile (768.8/km^{2}). There were 529 housing units at an average density of 846.7 per square mile (326.9/km^{2}). The racial makeup of the village was 98.79% White, 0.16% African American, 0.16% Native American, 0.16% Asian, 0.32% from other races, and 0.40% from two or more races. Hispanic or Latino of any race were 1.29% of the population.

There were 507 households, out of which 32.0% had children under the age of 18 living with them, 58.0% were married couples living together, 10.7% had a female householder with no husband present, and 28.8% were non-families. 26.2% of all households were made up of individuals, and 12.8% had someone living alone who was 65 years of age or older. The average household size was 2.45 and the average family size was 2.95.

In the village, the population was spread out, with 25.9% under the age of 18, 5.9% from 18 to 24, 29.5% from 25 to 44, 21.6% from 45 to 64, and 17.0% who were 65 years of age or older. The median age was 38 years. For every 100 females, there were 91.4 males. For every 100 females age 18 and over, there were 87.0 males.

The median income for a household in the village was $41,900, and the median income for a family was $47,500. Males had a median income of $36,458 versus $26,667 for females. The per capita income for the village was $19,478. About 7.8% of families and 7.9% of the population were below the poverty line, including 11.8% of those under age 18 and 5.9% of those age 65 or over.

== Education ==
The school district is Olympia Community Unit School District 16.

== Notable residents ==
- Edward Buehrig, educator
