= National Register of Historic Places listings in Ripley County, Missouri =

Location of Ripley County in Missouri

This is a list of the National Register of Historic Places listings in Ripley County, Missouri.

This is intended to be a complete list of the properties and districts on the National Register of Historic Places in Ripley County, Missouri, United States. Latitude and longitude coordinates are provided for many National Register properties and districts; these locations may be seen together in a map.

There are 9 properties and districts listed on the National Register in the county.

This National Park Service list is complete through NPS recent listings posted March 14, 2025.

== Current listings ==
	Name on the Register	Image	Date listed	Location	City or town	Description
1	B-9 Structure Archeological Site		October 7, 1975 (#75001072)	Address Restricted	Grandin	
2	Randolph Columbus Barrett House	Randolph Columbus Barrett House	November 7, 1976 (#76001115)	209 Plum St. 36°37′17″N 90°49′25″W	Doniphan	
3	Indian Ford		June 21, 2007 (#07000574)	Address Restricted	Doniphan	
4	Little Black River Archeological District		April 21, 1975 (#75001064)	Western half of the southwestern quarter of Section 21, Township 22 North, Range 4 East; 36°32′14″N 90°38′44″W	Naylor	Location is that of the McCarty-Moore Site, one of the largest Ripley County sites in the district
5	Mule Camp Site		November 11, 1975 (#75001071)	Address Restricted	Fairdealing	
6	Price Site		April 3, 1978 (#78001674)	Address Restricted	Currentview	
7	Ripley County Courthouse	Ripley County Courthouse	November 7, 1976 (#76001116)	Courthouse Circle; 36°37′04″N 90°49′37″W	Doniphan	
8	Ripley County Jail, Sheriff's Office and Sheriff's Residence	Ripley County Jail, Sheriff's Office and Sheriff's Residence	April 5, 1991 (#91000386)	Courthouse Cir. 36°37′01″N 90°49′39″W	Doniphan	
9	Sylvan School		October 10, 2002 (#02001109)	County Road H4, approximately 2 miles (3.2 km) southwest of the junction of Missouri Routes 142 and W 36°32′14″N 90°38′21″W	Naylor	

== See also ==
- List of National Historic Landmarks in Missouri
- National Register of Historic Places listings in Missouri
