= Tornado outbreak sequence of April 23–28, 2026 =

April 2026 United States tornado outbreak sequence

- Map of confirmed tornadoes and tornado warnings from April 23 to April 28

Meteorological history
- Duration: April 23–28, 2026

Tornado outbreak
- Tornadoes: 119
- Max. rating: EF4 tornado
- Duration: 5 days, 1 hour, 22 minutes
- Highest winds: Tornadic – 180 mph (290 km/h) (Enid, Oklahoma EF4 on April 23)* *(A wind gust of greater than 205 mph (330 km/h) was estimated)
- Highest gusts: Non-tornadic – 100 mph (160 km/h) in Ripley County, Missouri
- Largest hail: 4.75 inches (12.1 cm) near Elwood, Missouri on April 28

Overall effects
- Fatalities: 1 (+2 non-tornadic)
- Injuries: 11
- Areas affected: Western and Central United States
- Part of the Tornadoes of 2026

A multi-day sequence of tornadoes and tornado outbreaks occurred in the United States from April 23–28, 2026. This event followed an active pattern of severe weather in mid-April, including a widespread tornado outbreak across the Midwestern United States on April 17. On April 23, an enhanced risk for severe weather forecast was issued by the SPC for portions of eastern Kansas and northern Oklahoma, and strong tornadoes possible along a dryline in Oklahoma. Multiple tornado watches and warnings were issued during the afternoon and evening. A tornado emergency was issued for southern Enid when an EF4 tornado caused extensive damage to multiple houses and other structures on April 23, injuring one person.

A moderate risk for severe weather was issued on April 25 for portions of Oklahoma and Texas. That evening, a high-end EF2 tornado tracked through portions of Runaway Bay, Texas, completely destroying one home and heavily damaging multiple others, killing one person and inflicting numerous injuries. In Runaway Bay, 1,690 people were left without power and 248 are without power in Springtown. Twenty families were left displaced by the tornadoes. On April 28, another moderate risk of severe weather was outlined for portions of North Texas. That evening, an EF3 tornado tracked through portions of Mineral Wells, Texas, destroying warehouses and significantly damaging several homes. Five people were injured, two of whom were hospitalized.

Overall, 119 tornadoes were confirmed from this outbreak sequence and resulted in three deaths, one that was tornadic and two that were related to non-tornadic impacts. At least 21 people were also injured.

== Meteorological synopsis ==
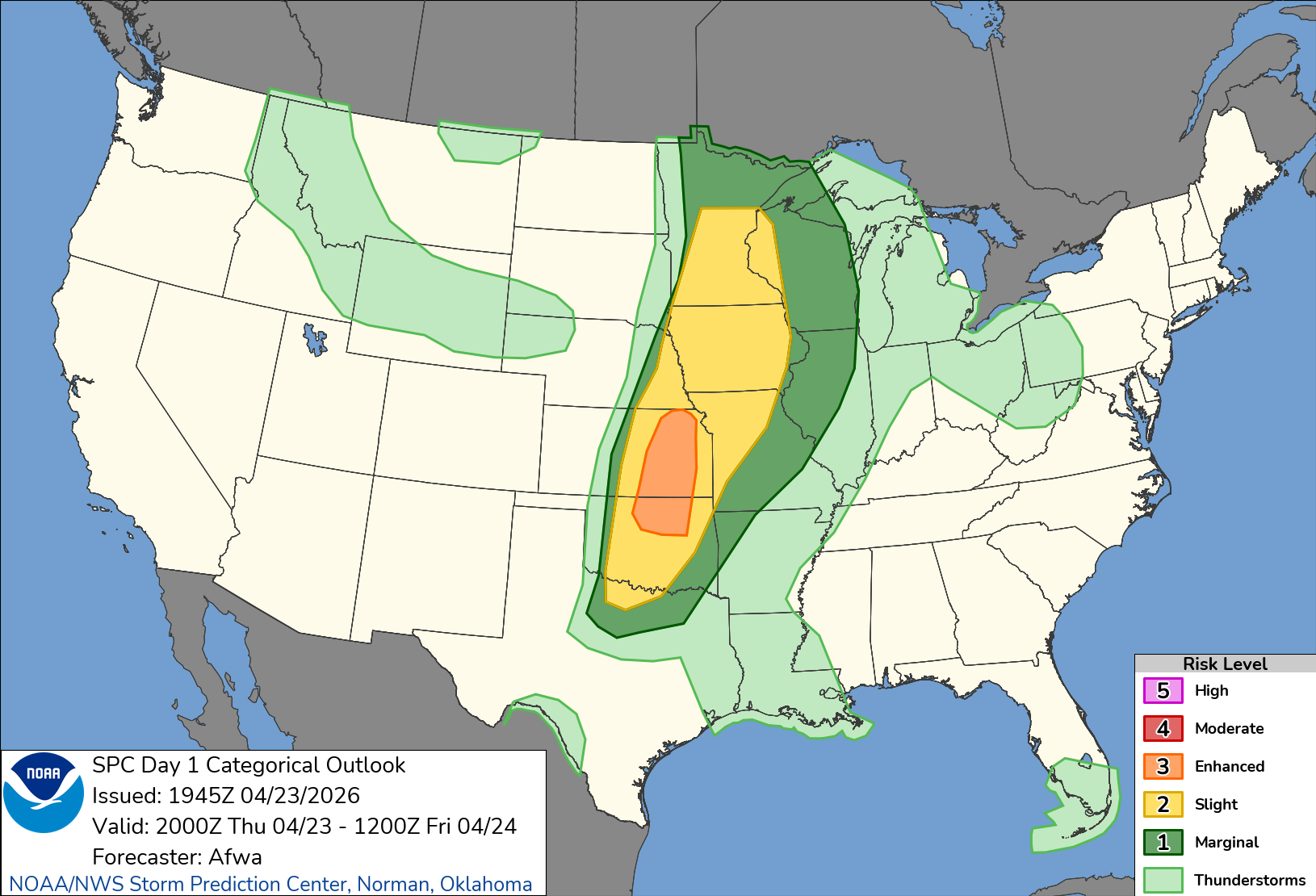
SPC Day 1 outlook issued on April 23, 2026, at 2000 UTC

=== April 23 ===
On April 23, an enhanced risk for severe weather was issued by the Storm Prediction Center (SPC), and strong tornadoes were predicted to be possible along a dryline in Oklahoma. Multiple tornado watches and warnings were issued during the afternoon and evening, The Enid tornado developed on the evening of April 23, 2026, as part of a regional severe weather outbreak affecting portions of the central United States. The event was associated with a strongly unstable air mass across northern Oklahoma, characterized by rich low-level moisture, steep lapse rates, and strong vertical wind shear conducive to supercell thunderstorm development.

Thunderstorm initiation occurred during the late afternoon and evening hours as a capping inversion weakened, allowing explosive convective development. Discrete supercells formed across northern Oklahoma and southern Kansas, several of which became tornadic. One dominant supercell tracked eastward across Garfield County, Oklahoma, producing a violent, long-lived EF4 tornado near Enid. The parent supercell exhibited classic characteristics of a cyclic tornadic storm, maintaining a persistent mesocyclone as it traversed the region. The broader convective system produced multiple tornadoes across Oklahoma and neighboring states, along with large hail and damaging winds.

=== April 25–27 ===
A moderate risk was issued on April 25 for parts of Oklahoma and Texas, delineating a 10% risk for tornadoes highlighted for the Texas and Oklahoma border.

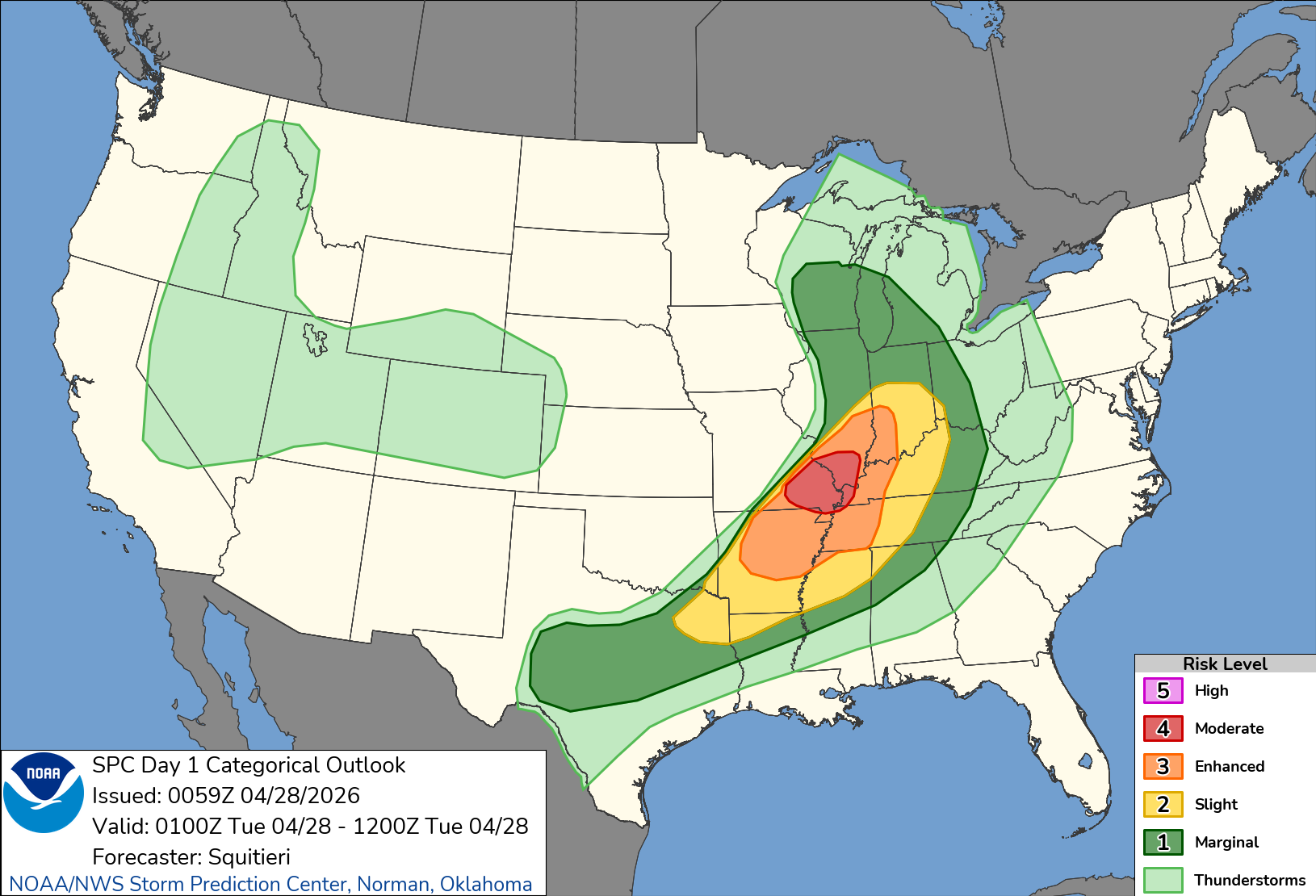
SPC Day 1 outlook issued on April 27, 2026, at 2000 UTC

Another moderate risk was issued on April 27 for parts of Missouri and Illinois with small parts of Kentucky and Tennessee for the risk for multiple strong to intense tornadoes. A 15% risk of tornadoes was outlined. A PDS Tornado watch was issued at 2:45 P.M. CDT, covering northeast Arkansas and western Tennessee, southeastern Missouri, southern Illinois, southwest Indiana, and western Kentucky. April 27 was the first day where the majority of the severe storms were not caused by the near-stationary extratropical cyclone which caused the severe weather from April 23 to April 26, instead being caused by an intense extratropical cyclone which moved in just south of it. On April 27, one long-tracked EF2 tornado was confirmed in Missouri well east of Kansas City, but all the other tornadoes were relatively weak as supercells were unable to reach the intensity that was expected of them.

=== April 28 ===
On April 28, a third moderate risk was issued for parts of northern Texas, including the Dallas-Fort Worth metroplex. A 45% risk for hail was issued with baseball to grapefruit sized hail likely with intense supercells.

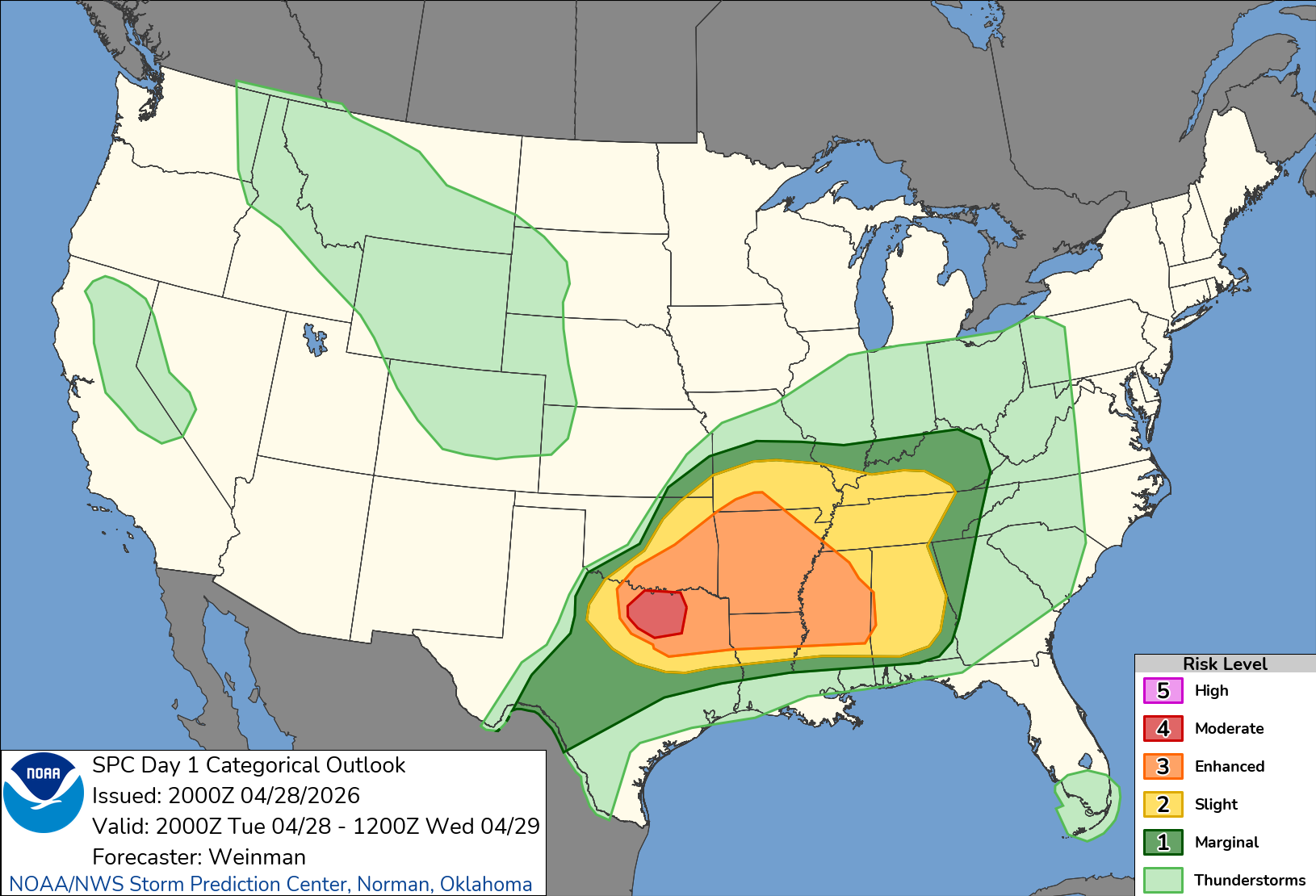
SPC Day 1 outlook issued on April 28, 2026 at 2000 UTC

After some morning activity centered in north-central Texas tracking East, a few Storms developed in the same region by about 2:00pm, with all the storms quickly strengthening and becoming supercells due to the favorable environment, mainly moving southeast. In particular, one parent storm and its second to the side tracked southward for several hours producing up to softball sized hail and damaging winds before finally dying down by midnight, the parent storm showing a good hook echo on radar and very strong RFD outflow winds. The storm also produced a few tornadoes to the east of Dallas, with its strongest being an EF1 tornado that damaged a few metal structures and uprooted trees.

== Confirmed tornadoes ==
Confirmed tornadoes by Enhanced Fujita rating
EFU	EF0	EF1	EF2	EF3	EF4	EF5	Total
26	41	44	6	1	1	0	119

=== Vance Air Force Base–Enid, Oklahoma ===
Vance Air Force Base–Enid, Oklahoma
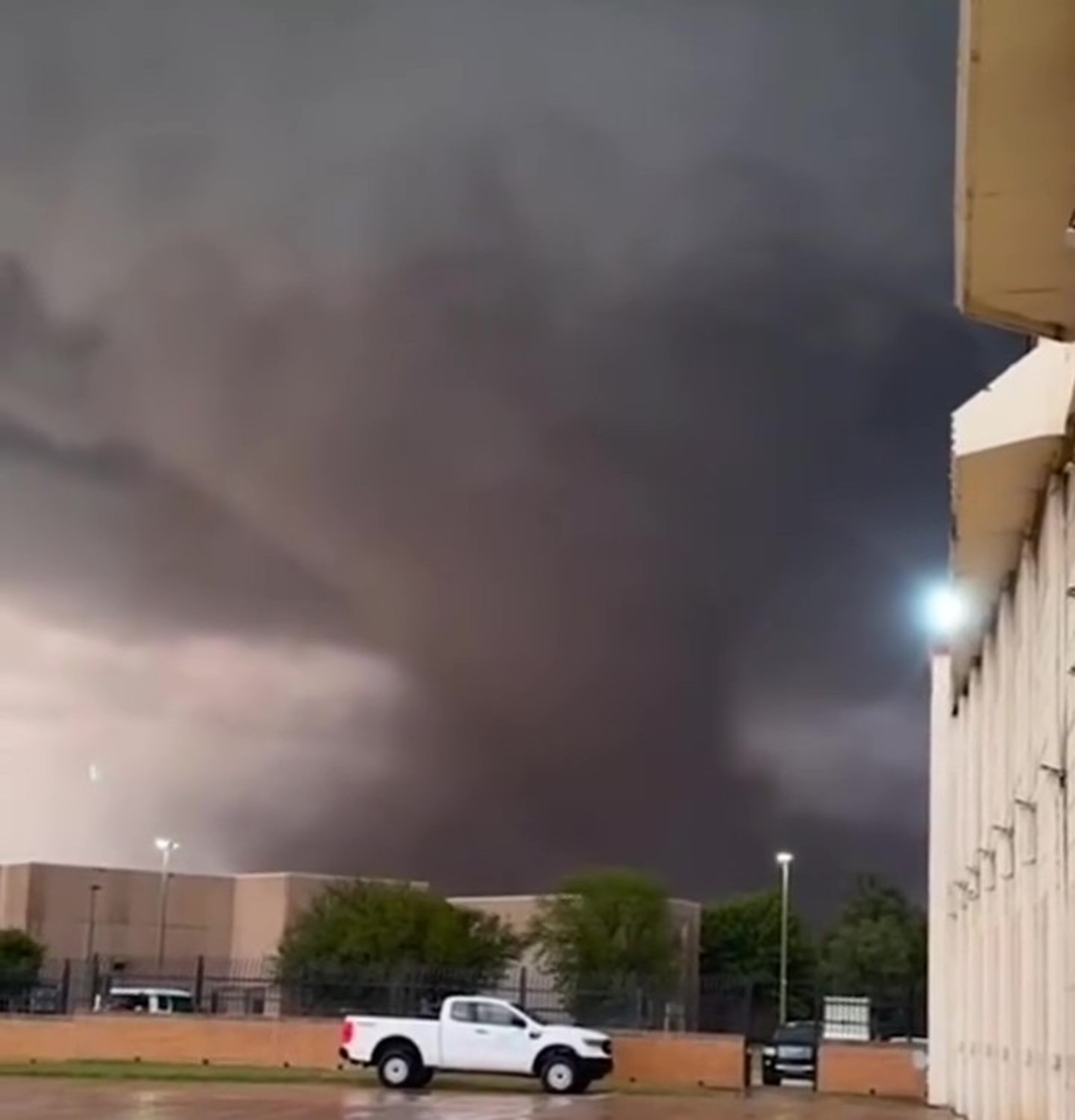
- The violent tornado viewed by Vance USAF personnel to the south of Enid, Oklahoma

Meteorological history
- Formed: April 23, 2026, 8:11 p.m. CDT (UTC–05:00)
- Dissipated: April 23, 2026, 8:48 p.m. CDT (UTC–05:00)
- Duration: 37 minutes

EF4 tornado
- on the Enhanced Fujita scale
- Highest winds: Official intensity: 180 mph (290 km/h); Unofficial intensity: >205 mph (330 km/h) (3-second wind gust estimated by researchers from UIUC and NOAA NSSL)

Overall effects
- Fatalities: 0
- Injuries: 1–10 (Note: The finalized report from the National Oceanic and Atmospheric Administration lists only one direct injury from the tornado along with the statement: "there was only one injury that required transport". Following the tornado, the Garfield County emergency manager reported at least ten people were injured.)

This long-lived, slow-moving, and violent tornado, which prompted the issuance of a tornado emergency, touched down just outside of Vance Air Force Base in Garfield County at 8:11 pm CDT. It initially moved east-northeastward, causing minor EF0 tree damage before crossing South Oakwood Road and moving over the southern side of the base, crossing over a runway. After exiting the base, the tornado began to rapidly intensify and reached EF2 strength as it turned due east and crossed over Cleveland Street, knocking over tanks and road signs, snapping or uprooting trees, and leaving swirl marks in wheat fields. The tornado then turned northeastward and crossed Wheat Capital Road before knocking down more road signs and power poles as it crossed US 81 south of Enid.

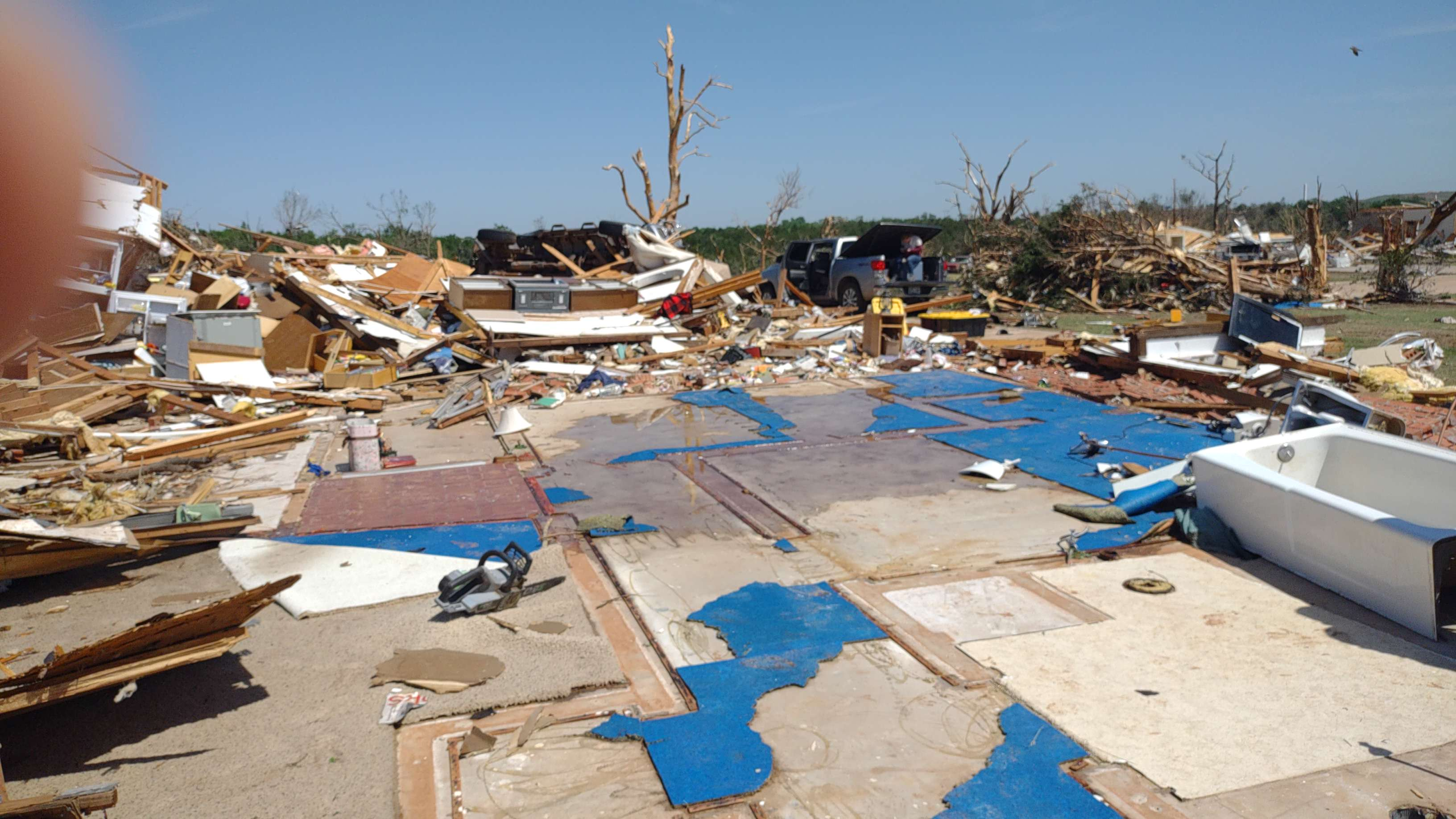
A well-built home near Enid that was completely demolished

The tornado then became violent and reached EF4 intensity as it crested a small hill and struck the Grayridge neighborhood. Several homes in the community were heavily damaged or destroyed, including six that were leveled with winds estimated at 160–170 mph (260–270 km/h), and several others had exterior walls knocked down and roofs removed. It also swept away an outbuilding, damaged and destroyed vehicles, and uprooted and debarked trees. The tornado maintained EF3-EF4 intensity as it continued northeastward, obliterating entire groves of trees, including one hardwood tree that was pulled from the ground and displaced 20 ft (6.1 m) to the east, snapping power poles, inflicting minor roof damage to at least one home along East Fox Drive, tossing several sections of 40 ft (12 m) pipe into a field, and depositing dumpsters into a gulley as it reached EF4 intensity again and crossed South 16th Street. The tornado then turned north-northeastward and struck a farmstead as it crossed East Southgate Road, heavily damaging or destroying multiple outbuildings and metal building systems, including a newly constructed machine shed and a well-built pole barn that were swept away, breaking a 40 ft (12 m) shipping container into pieces, which were scattered in a field, tossing two RVs, with one of them not being found until over a month later 305–310 yd (279–283 m) northeast of its original location, and destroying a canopy. One structure was so obliterated that storm surveyors were unable to determine what it was; a home nearby suffered extensive roof and exterior wall damage, wood and metal fencing was extensively damaged, with some poles ripped from the ground, and extreme ground scouring was noted as well, along with a debris field that was blown downwind. After striking the farmstead, the tornado snapped three wooden H-frame transmission towers as it continued north-northeastward. It then turned back northeastward and again fluctuated between EF3-EF4 intensity, mauling another grove of trees, removing them from the ground, and tossing them.

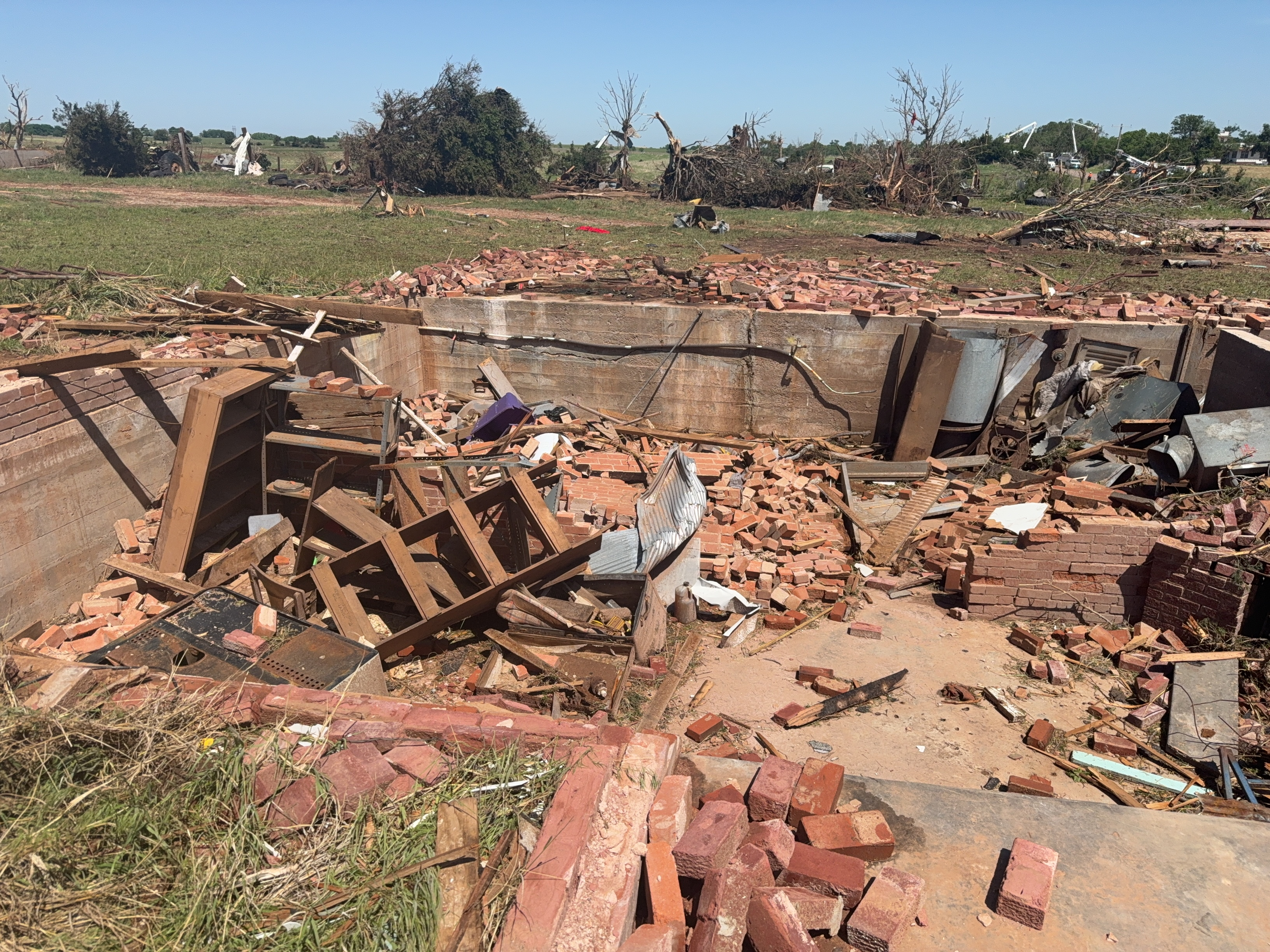
A poorly-anchored two-story farmhouse that was completely swept away at EF4 intensity along South 30th Street

Southeast of Enid, the tornado executed a loop west of South 30th Street, tossing another tree, which was never found. The outer part of the circulation uprooted trees, twisted, and blew over a stop sign at the intersection of Rupe Avenue and South 30th Street, and knocked down power poles. The tornado then reached EF4 intensity for the final time and struck another farmstead with estimated peak winds of 180 mph (290 km/h) as it completed its loop and moved east-southeastward; a poorly-anchored two-story cinderblock farmhouse was completely swept away, an outbuilding was leveled, large farm objects were tossed and destroyed, and a truck bed was twisted into a mangled tree. One large tank was displaced 50–55 yd (46–50 m) to the north, an adjacent large tank was thrown and then dragged or rolled for 305–308 yd (279–282 m) to the east-sortheast, and a bald cypress tree was stripped of all its leaves, flagged of all its significant branches, partially debarked, and thrown to the east-southeast approximately 120 yd (110 m). Nearby, more trees were obliterated, including several trees that were removed from the ground or snapped at their base and thrown significant distances and/or left with little to no limbs, along with being partially or mostly debarked, fences were damaged, and extensive ground scouring was left behind along with swirl marks in a wheat field as well.

After crossing South 30th Street, the tornado weakened as it continued east-southeastward and then east-northeastward, but remained intense, extensively damaging another tree line at EF3 intensity. An outbuilding on the outer fringe of the circulation also suffered minor EF0 roof damage, although it was later determined that part of the roof was already missing from the structure. The tornado then turned back to the northeast, and struck a third farmstead as it crossed South 42nd Street near its intersection with East Rupe Avenue. Multiple outbuildings were destroyed, including one large well-built one that was leveled, with pickup trucks inside of it shifted on the slab, and a wooden power pole was pulled out of the ground and tossed about 100 ft (30 m). More wooden power poles were snapped, trees were snapped, uprooted, and debarked, hay bales were moved a significant distance, shrubbery was mangled and yanked, a fence was obliterated, and a water well faucet was pulled from the ground as well. The house on the property was largely spared as it suffered only EF0 siding damage. The tornado then steadily weakened as it executed a second loop and again moved east-southeastward before turning east-northeastward along East Rupe Avenue, snapping more trees at high-end EF1 intensity before dissipating right before reaching Boggy Creek, to the west of the Enid Woodring Regional Airport at 8:48 pm CDT.

Radar animation of the supercell that produced the tornado.

The tornado was on the ground for 37 minutes, tracked 9.5 mi (15.3 km), and reached a maximum width of 600 yd (550 m). The tornado injured one person along its path, and it was the strongest tornado to strike Garfield County since an F4 tornado impacted to the east nearly 35 years prior, on April 26, 1991. It was also the first EF4 tornado to occur in the state since an EF4 tornado that struck Barnsdall on May 6, 2024. A photograph from Enid was found over 100 mi (160 km) away in Bartlesville, Oklahoma. In July 2026, researchers from the University of Illinois Urbana-Champaign and the National Severe Storms Laboratory estimated the winds of this tornado be above the threshold of EF5 intensity, with winds greater than 205 mph (330 km/h). Another estimate, conducted through a Monte Carlo method, concluded that the maximum estimated winds were 91–97 m/s (200–220 mph; 330–350 km/h). As a result, it was determined that the tornado likely possessed EF5 winds in the vicinity of East Southgate Road, however the rating remained unchanged.

=== Runaway Bay, Texas ===
Runaway Bay, Texas
- The tornado as seen from a distance while impacting Runaway Bay, Texas

Meteorological history
- Formed: April 25, 2026, 9:03 p.m. CDT (UTC–05:00)
- Dissipated: April 25, 2026, 9:07 p.m. CDT (UTC–05:00)
- Duration: 4 minutes

EF2 tornado
- on the Enhanced Fujita scale
- Highest winds: 130 mph (210 km/h)

Overall effects
- Fatalities: 1
- Injuries: 6
- Damage: $5 million (2026 USD)

This short-lived but strong and deadly tornado first touched down in Wise County, Texas, in Runaway Bay, just to the south of US 380 at the Port O Call Drive/Pinto Court intersection. The tornado began to track unusually westward, paralleling Port O Call Drive and producing a swath of EF0 tree damage that was 100–200 yards (91–183 m) wide. The tornado snapped large branches and uprooted trees as it crossed Navajo Court and Palomino Court, expanding in width to nearly 1/3 mile (540 m) as it approached Cimmarron Trail. The tornado continued to inflict damage to trees and minor damage to roofs as it crossed Cimmarron Trail, entering a neighborhood to the west. Within the neighborhood, the tornado produced a large swath of EF0–EF1 damage, with small vortices producing EF2-rated damage.

The tornado further expanded in width as it paralleled Cheyenne Drive to the south, snapping more branches off trees before it tracked just north of Buck Court. Along Buck Court, hardwood trees were snapped and several manufactured homes sustained damage, including one that was pushed off its foundation at EF1 intensity. The tornado crossed Overland Trail just to the north of the Overland Trail/Buck Court intersection, where it impacted several manufactured homes along Brookview Drive and Overland Trail. A single-wide mobile home along the western side of Overland Trail was completely rolled but remained intact, and another mobile home to the south slid off its foundation. Near the Brookview Drive/Overland Trail intersection, a pole was collapsed and double-wide mobile home along Brookview Drive sustained significant damage to its roof. To the south, another mobile home on the eastern side of Overland Trail was pushed off its CMU foundation and several others sustained minor damage.

The tornado intensifed further as it approached Cactus Canyon Drive, impacting a home on the northeast side of the Cactus Canyon Drive/Brookview Drive intersection. The two-story residence had large portions of the roof structure torn away and some exterior walls on the second floor collapsed from estimated wind speeds of 125 mph (201 km/h). To the south along the eastern side of the street, a pole was completely destroyed and two homes sustained EF1 damage. The tornado continued westward, crossing Cactus Canyon Drive and striking various homes near the western and northern side of the street. A single-wide mobile home to the northwest of the Cactus Canyon Drive/Brookview Drive intersection was completely destroyed, with the remains being blown into the side of a nearby house. A single-family home along the northern side of Cactus Canyon Drive had almost its entire roof structure removed, and another single-wide mobile home just to the north on the southern side of Overland Trail was demolished, with the debris being carried away.

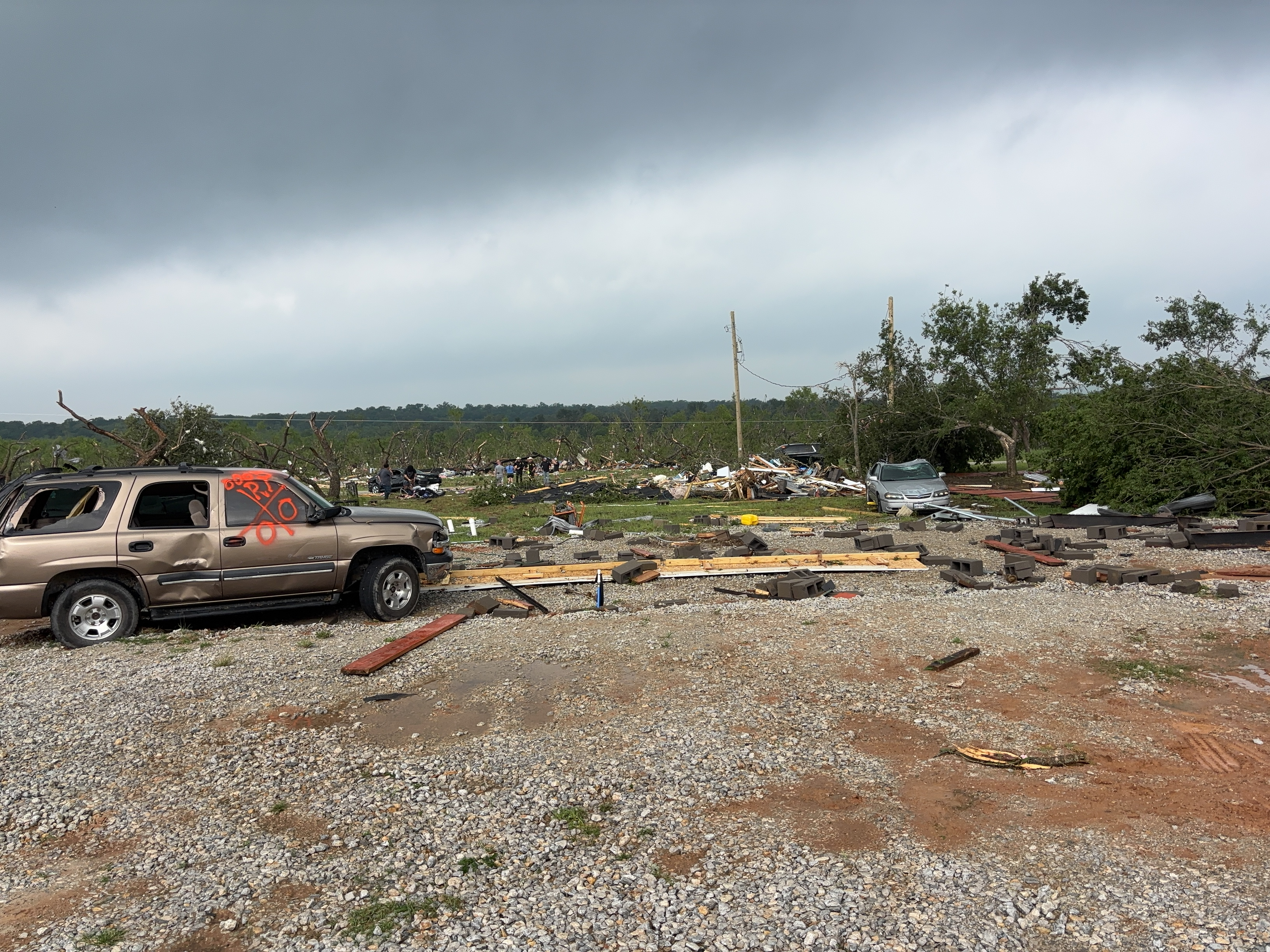
A double-wide mobile home that was completely destroyed at high-end EF2 intensity

The tornado paralleled Cactus Canyon Drive just to the south, inflicting damage to trees and damaging the roofs of homes before crossing Cumberland Trail and reaching its maximum width and peak intensity. To the southwest of the Cumberland Trail/Overland Trail intersection, a double-wide mobile home was obliterated from estimated wind speeds of 130 mph (210 km/h), with the metal frame being displaced 100 yards (91 m) away from the home's original position and other debris being scattered even further away. At this residence, a 51-year-old man was killed. A home to the north sustained EF1 damage as the tornado continued westward, crossing Jasper Road and causing severe damage to hardwood trees before shrinking and dissipating around 600 yards (550 m) west of Jasper Road.

The tornado reached a maximum width of 650 yards (590 m), tracked for 1.41 miles (2.27 km), and was on ground for four minutes. Over 20 homes in Runaway Bay sustained significant damage, around $5 million (2026 USD) was inflicted in damages, and a total of one fatality and six injuries were confirmed.

=== Mineral Wells, Texas ===
Mineral Wells, Texas
- The rain-wrapped tornado northwest of Mineral Wells, Texas shortly after formation

Meteorological history
- Formed: April 28, 2026, 5:00 p.m. CDT (UTC–05:00)
- Dissipated: April 28, 2026, 5:10 p.m. CDT (UTC–05:00)
- Duration: 10 minutes

EF3 tornado
- on the Enhanced Fujita scale
- Highest winds: 145 mph (233 km/h)

Overall effects
- Fatalities: 0
- Injuries: 5
- Damage: $2.3 million (2026 USD)

This intense and damaging tornado first touched down at 5:00 p.m. CDT, just north of Mineral Wells near FM 1821 and Sundown Road. The tornado inflicted minor EF0 damage to trees and fences as it continued southeastward, tracking over Ellis White Road before entering the Country Club Estates neighborhood. In this area, trees were uprooted and numerous homes sustained damage, with one residence having its entire roof torn away and displaced around 200 ft (61 m) at EF2 intensity. A west-facing carport was completely destroyed, and the east-facing carport suffered roof damage. Another home had an exterior wall collapse, and several power poles were snapped. The tornado crossed Bowle Street before inflicting EF2 damage to a home and nearby hardwood trees. An outbuilding was destroyed, and two shipping containers were turned over and displaced by the tornado. The tornado then tracked along Villa Lane, damaging several residences and lofting a trailer. The tornado crossed Crocket Street, damaging several metal buildings along the west side of Sam Houston Road and partially unroofing and knocking down two walls on the second floor of a two-story home. The tornado then tracked across Travis Street, significantly damaging a commercial building along the north side of the road. The tornado crossed Gorgas Road, damaging more commercial buildings as it turns sharper to the southeast.

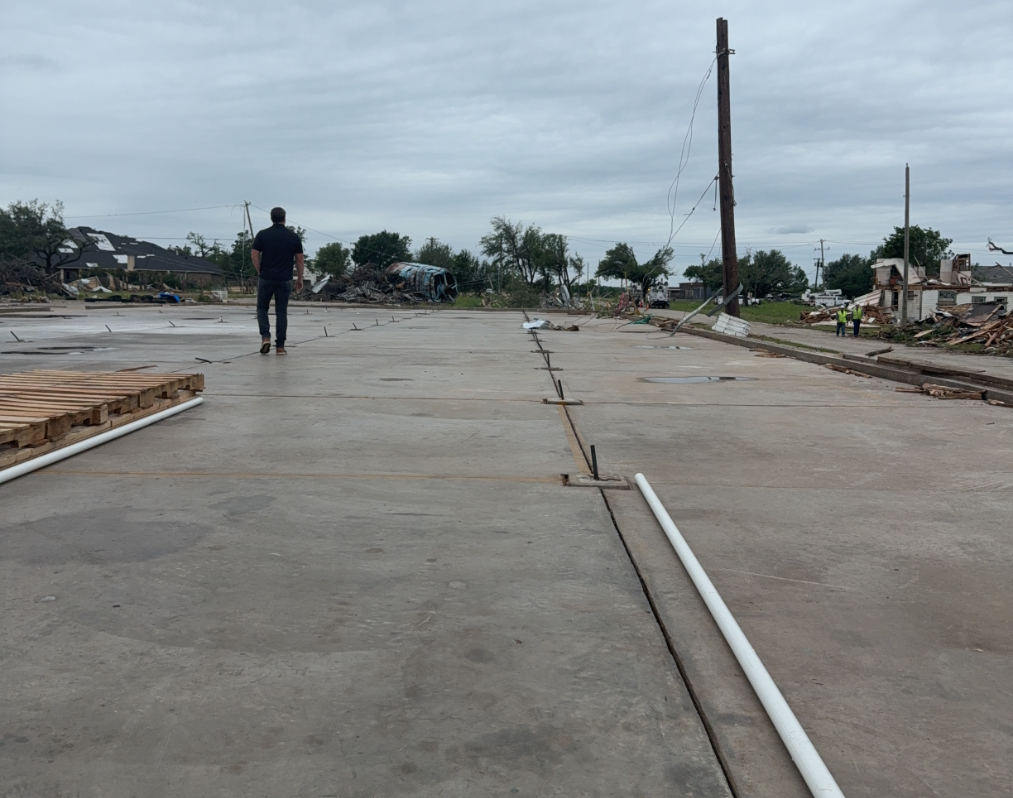
A warehouse that was swept clean off its foundation

The tornado snapped and scattered various hardwood trees before crossing Ross Road and intensifying as it entered the Wolters Historical Park area. The tornado damaged several homes and buildings at high-end EF2 strength before severely damaging and debarking hardwood trees at low-end EF3 intensity. The tornado tracked across Van Story Street and completely demolished several metal buildings at EF3 intensity with estimated wind speeds of 145 mph (233 km/h). A warehouse was completely swept off its foundation, and a smaller structure was also swept away. Another metal building had numerous metal panels torn away, and several trees were damaged and uprooted. The tornado then entered Holiday Hills Estates, completely overturning an outbuilding and damaging numerous homes along Wimbleton Court and Holiday Hills Drive. Two residences had large sections of their roofs torn away at EF2 strength, and various trees were damaged or snapped in the area.

The tornado turned more southward, crossing Washington Road and entering the Wolters Industrial Park. The tornado destroyed numerous World War II-era warehouses, with some fully collapsing and others partially collapsing. One warehouse was destroyed at low-end EF3 intensity, and a nearby mid-rise building had stucco walls blown inwards at high-end EF2 strength. The tornado then weakened as it continued southeast, damaging trees along US 180 from Washington Road to High Point Road before tracking south of US-180 and dissipating in a forest near the Dry Creek at 5:10 p.m. CDT.

The tornado reached a peak width of 800 yards (730 m), traveled 5.11 miles (8.22 km) in 10 minutes, and inflicted $2.3 million (2026 USD) in damages. Along its track, the tornado damaged or destroyed 132 buildings and injured five people, two of whom were transported to a nearby hospital.

== Non-tornadic effects ==
Severe thunderstorms on the night of April 25 brought down trees and power lines in North Texas. Winds of up to 90 mph (140 km/h) impacted the Springtown, Texas area. Nearly 40,000 Oncor customers were without power in North Texas. In Louisiana, over 16,000 customers lost power across the state.

On April 27, a thunderstorm in Michigan downed multiple trees, with a man being killed after one fell on him.

On April 28, straight-line winds of around 100 mph (160 km/h) began just southeast of Doniphan, Missouri, damaging a home, then moved east-southeast through Oxly and areas near Naylor. In Oxly, many trees were snapped or uprooted, and outbuildings and power lines were severely damaged. Near Naylor, a grain bin was blown a long distance and a large outbuilding was shifted off its foundation, with one child slightly injured by debris. To the west of there, numerous supercells formed across southeast Kansas, northeast Oklahoma, northwest Arkansas, and southwest Missouri, and moved northeastward producing large to very large hail. One supercell thunderstorm split from another one in Barry County, Missouri and became a prolific and destructive hail producer as it tracked north-northeastward through Lawrence, Christian, Greene, Dallas, Webster, Laclede, and Camden counties. It caused widespread significant damage to thousands of cars, residential homes, and buildings. The swath of hail damage was 123.32 mi (198.46 km) long from this left-split storm that produced hail 2.75–4.75 in (7.0–12.1 cm) in size throughout the late morning and early afternoon hours. Most of the cars in the hailstorm's path had severely shattered windows or complete demolition of the entire vehicle, particularly in an autobody shop where the owner received "thousands of calls" for the totaled cars. The giant hail also killed an emu at a local zoo. Damage surveys have been ongoing, but the estimated cost of this event could be in the tens of millions of dollars range, likely the costliest hailstorm in the city's history (previous hailstorm caused $4 million in damage). Immediately after the storm, several car crashes damaged utility and over 10,000 consumers were left without power. At the time of the incident, a three body scatter spike was visible on radar imagery.

== Aftermath ==
In the immediate aftermath of the outbreak, emergency services and local authorities initiated search and rescue operations across affected areas of Enid and surrounding communities. First responders, including fire departments, law enforcement agencies, and medical personnel, worked through the night to locate injured residents, assess structural damage, and secure hazardous areas. Temporary shelters were established for displaced individuals, while hospitals in the region treated those injured by debris and structural collapses. Reports indicated that at least several individuals were injured, though no fatalities were immediately confirmed. Utility infrastructure sustained significant damage, resulting in widespread power outages and disruptions to essential services. Roads were blocked by debris, downed power lines, and damaged vehicles, complicating emergency response and recovery operations. Preliminary damage assessments indicated that numerous homes and businesses were destroyed or severely damaged, particularly along the tornado's path. Estimates suggested that dozens of structures sustained significant damage. In the days following the disaster, cleanup and recovery efforts continued, with volunteers and community organizations assisting in debris removal and aid distribution. Local and state officials coordinated response efforts and began evaluating long-term recovery needs, including the potential for state and federal disaster assistance.

== See also ==
- List of United States tornadoes in April 2026
