= Pulaski, Missouri =

Unincorporated community in the U.S. state of Missouri

Coordinates: 36°36′50″N 90°44′48″W

Pulaski is an unincorporated community in Ripley County, in the U.S. state of Missouri. The community is located along the Missouri Pacific Railroad line, four miles east of Doniphan and three miles west of Oxly.

== History ==
A post office called Pulaski was established in 1912, and remained in operation until 1935. The community bears the name of Casimir Pulaski, a Polish military commander and Revolutionary War hero.
