= Doniphan Hollow =

Valley in the U.S. state of Missouri

Coordinates: 36.7931123°N 91.4120816°W

Doniphan Hollow is a valley in Oregon County in the U.S. state of Missouri.

Doniphan Hollow was so named on account of a local road which led to Doniphan, Missouri.
