= Mansco Hollow =

Valley in Missouri, United States

Coordinates: 36.725612°N 90.944015°W

Mansco Hollow is a valley in Ripley County in the U.S. state of Missouri.

Mansco Hollow has the name of the local Mansco family.
