= Sylvan School =

- U.S. National Register of Historic Places
- Location within Missouri Location within the United States
- Location: Cty Rd H4, approx. 2 mi. SW of jct. MO 142 and W, Naylor, Missouri
- Coordinates: 36°32′14″N 90°38′21″W
- Area: 1 acre (0.40 ha)
- Built: 1926
- Built by: Rodgers, W.D.
- Architectural style: one-room schoolhouse
- NRHP reference No.: 02001109
- Added to NRHP: October 10, 2002

Sylvan School, also known as Pig Ankle School, Sylvan Community Building, Sylvan Sunday School and Church of the Firstborn, is a historic one-room school located at Naylor, Ripley County, Missouri, USA. It was built in 1926 and is a one-story, one room rectangular frame building measuring 48 feet 4 inches by 38 feet 4 inches and has a hipped roof. Classes were conducted in the building until 1956.

It was added to the National Register of Historic Places in 2002.
