= Little Black River (Current River tributary) =

Stream in the American states of Missouri and Arkansas

The Little Black River is a stream in Ripley and Butler counties in southeast Missouri and Clay and Randolph counties of northeast Arkansas. It is a tributary to the Current River.

The stream headwaters arise at 36°44′48″N 90°44′15″W in Ripley County, Missouri, at the confluence of the North and South Prongs just west of the Greenville Ford Public Access Area and Missouri Route K. The stream flows to the southeast passing through the Mudpuppy Conservation Area and enters Butler County 2 miles north-northwest of the community of Fairdealing. The stream flows south for about 2.5 miles and turns southwest re-entering Ripley County. It flows through the southeast corner of Ripley County and crosses the Missouri-Arkansas border 1 mile west of the community of Sinsabaugh, Missouri.

Within Arkansas the stream flows south in Clay County passing under Arkansas Highway 211 on the west side of Success. It flows to the southwest to enter the Current River on the Clay-Randolph county line 2.5 miles northwest of the community of Datto and 5 miles south of the Missouri-Arkansas state line. The confluence is at 36°25′17″N 90°45′27″W.
