= Runaway Bay =

Runaway Bay may refer to:

- Runaway Bay, Jamaica
- Runaway Bay, Queensland, Australia, a suburb of Gold Coast City
- Runaway Bay, Texas, United States
- Runaway Bay (TV series), children's television series
- Runaway Bay (Bob Hope Presents the Chrysler Theatre), a 1966 American television play
