= Pine, Missouri =

Unincorporated community in Missouri, U.S.

Coordinates: 36.716°N 91.095°W

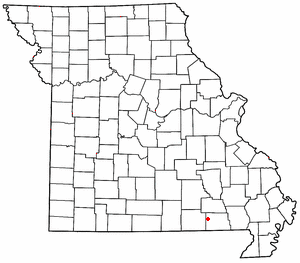

Pine is a small unincorporated community in western Ripley County, Missouri, United States. It is located on a county road in the Mark Twain National Forest, approximately sixteen miles northwest of Doniphan.

A post office called Pine was established in 1883, and remained in operation until the 1970s. The community was so named on account of pine trees near the original town site.
