= Cogshell Branch =

Stream in the American state of Missouri

Coordinates: 36.6433906°N 90.6823402°W

Cogshell Branch is a stream in Ripley County in the U.S. state of Missouri. It is a tributary of Cypress Creek.

Cogshell Branch has the name of Caleb Cogshell, an early settler.

== See also ==
- List of rivers of Missouri
