= Conway Hollow =

Valley in Missouri, United States

Coordinates: 36.7717222°N 90.9479043°W

Conway Hollow is a valley in Ripley County in the U.S. state of Missouri.

Conway Hollow has the name of the local Conway family.
