= Gatewood, Missouri =

Unincorporated community in the U.S. state of Missouri

Coordinates: 36°34′37″N 91°05′23″W

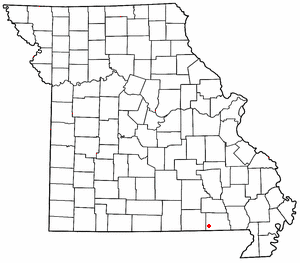

Gatewood is an unincorporated community in southwest Ripley County, Missouri, United States. It is located approximately fourteen miles west-southwest of Doniphan on Route 142.

A post office called Gatewood was established in 1854, and closed in 2001. The community has the name of Richard Gatewood, a pioneer citizen.
