= Leibig, Missouri =

Unincorporated community in Ripley County, Missouri

Coordinates: 36°32′55″N 90°57′05″W

Leibig is an unincorporated community in southwestern Ripley County, in the U.S. state of Missouri. The community is located approximately 8 miles southwest of Doniphan and 3 miles north of the Missouri-Arkansas border. The Fourche River is just west of the village.

== History ==
A variant spelling was "Liebig". A post office called Liebig was established in 1905, and remained in operation until 1931. The community has the name of John Liebig, a pioneer settler.
