= Pratt, Missouri =

Unincorporated community in Ripley County, Missouri

Coordinates: 36°31′48″N 90°49′52″W

Pratt is an unincorporated community in southwest Ripley County, in the U.S. state of Missouri. The community lies six miles south of Doniphan on Missouri Route A, 1.5 miles north of the Arkansas line and one mile west of the Current River.

== History ==
A post office called Pratt was established in 1894, and remained in operation until 1933. The community has the name of David Pratt, an early settler.
