= Ripley County Jail, Sheriff's Office and Sheriff's Residence =

- U.S. National Register of Historic Places
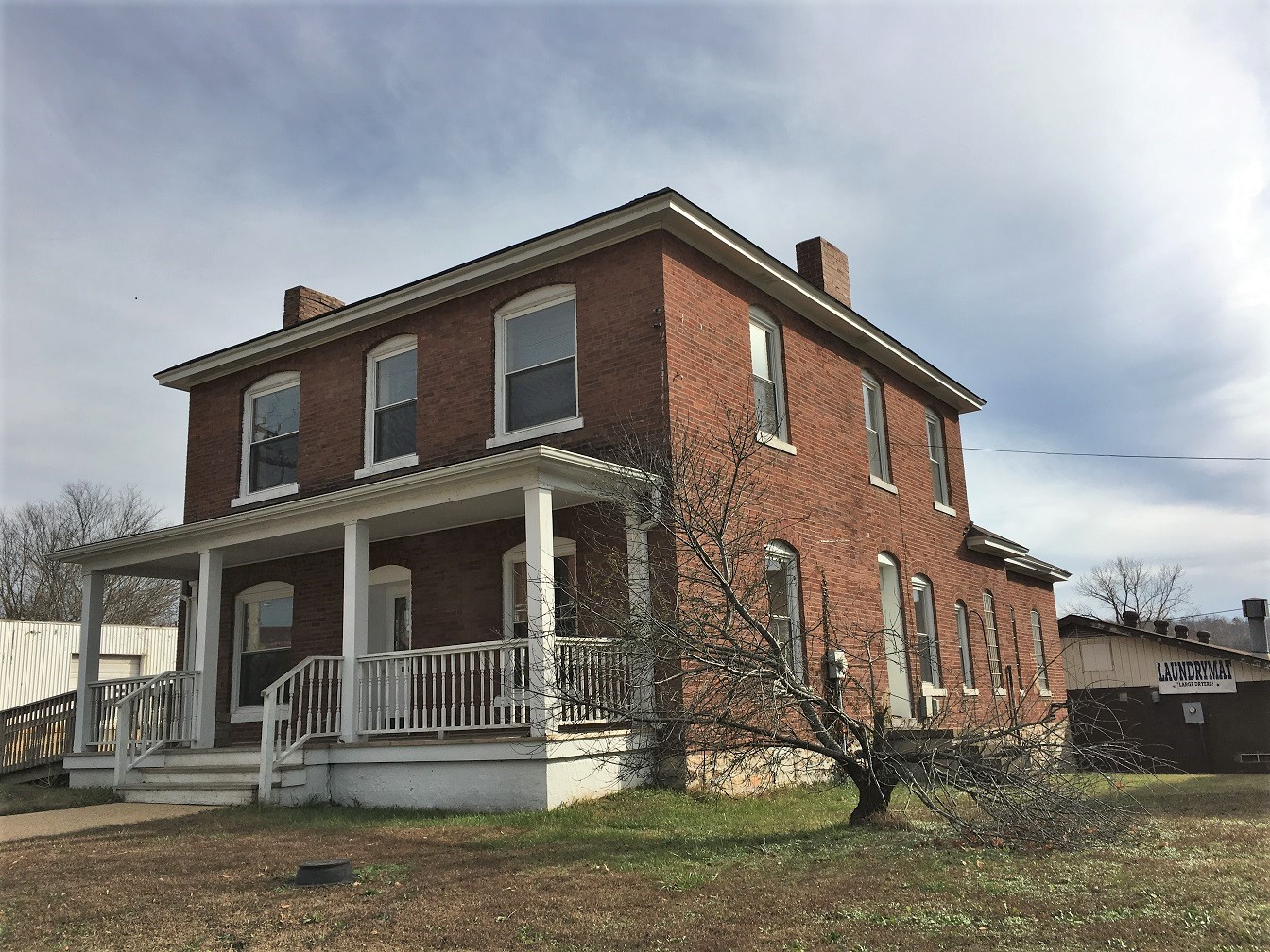

- Location within Missouri Location within the United States
- Location: Courthouse Cir. Doniphan, Missouri
- Coordinates: 36°37′1″N 90°49′39″W
- Area: less than one acre
- Built: 1899
- Architect: Schrage, Willam F.; Et al.
- Architectural style: Late Nineteenth Century Jail
- NRHP reference No.: 91000386
- Added to NRHP: April 5, 1991

Ripley County Jail, Sheriff's Office and Sheriff's Residence, also known as the Hancock Building, is a historic jail and sheriff's residence located at Doniphan, Ripley County, Missouri. It was built in 1899, and consists of a two-story front section containing the residence, with a one-story rear section containing the sheriff's office and the county jail. The building is constructed of brick, rests on a limestone foundation, and topped by a medium pitched hipped roof. It housed the jail and sheriff's office and residence until 1960.

It was added to the National Register of Historic Places in 1991.
