= Briar, Missouri =

Unincorporated community in Ripley County, Missouri

Coordinates: 36°38′54″N 90°58′18″W

Briar is an unincorporated community in Ripley County, Missouri, United States. It is located on U.S. Route 160, approximately seven miles west of Doniphan.

A variant name was Briarcreek. A post office called Briar Creek was established in 1879, the name was changed to Briar in 1936, and the post office closed in 1999. The community took its name from Briar Creek, which was so named on account of green briar near its course.
