= Purman, Missouri =

Unincorporated community in the U.S. state of Missouri

Coordinates: 36°31′22″N 90°44′48″W

Purman is an unincorporated community in Ripley County, in the U.S. state of Missouri.

== History ==
A post office called Purman was established in 1901, and remained in operation until 1913. The community has the name of one Mr. Purman, a pioneer citizen.
