= Torch, Missouri =

Unincorporated community in the U.S. state of Missouri

Coordinates: 36°32′11″N 90°40′34″W

Torch is an unincorporated community in Thomas Township, Ripley County, in the U.S. state of Missouri. The community is located in Ripley County's southeast.

The community is located on Missouri Route H between Glenn to the southwest and Hemenway to the northeast.

== History ==
A post office called Torch was established in 1920, and remained in operation until 1954. According to tradition, a local lumber mill regularly torched their scrap wood outside, hence the name Torch.
