= Hemenway, Missouri =

Unincorporated community in Missouri, United States

Coordinates: 36°32′54″N 90°39′06″W

Hemenway is an unincorporated community in southeastern Ripley County, in the U.S. state of Missouri.

The community is located on Missouri Route H, 1.5 miles northeast of Torch.

== History ==
A post office called Hemenway was established in 1907, and remained in operation until 1920. The community was named after James A. Hemenway, a legislator from Indiana, the native state of a first settler. A variant name was "Riga".
