= Budapest, Missouri =

Unincorporated community in Missouri, U.S.

Coordinates: 36.7689441°N 90.710953°W

Budapest is an unincorporated community in Ripley County, in the U.S. state of Missouri.

== History ==
A post office called Budapest was established in 1912, and remained in operation until 1922. The community was named after Budapest, Hungary, the native land of a share of the early settlers.
