= Carie, Missouri =

Unincorporated community in Ripley County, Missouri

Coordinates: 36°38′16″N 90°56′20″W

Carie is an unincorporated community in Ripley County, in the U.S. state of Missouri.

== History ==
A post office called Carie was established in 1898, and remained in operation until 1915. The etymology of Carie is unknown.
