= Handy, Missouri =

Unincorporated community in Missouri, U.S.

Coordinates: 36°48′33″N 91°06′25″W

Handy is an unincorporated community located in the northwest corner of Ripley County, in the U.S. state of Missouri.

== History ==
A post office called Handy was established in 1913, and remained in operation until 1954. The community's name is most likely derived from the last name of Noah Haney, a local merchant. A folk etymology maintains the townspeople wrote to postal officials requesting a post office, adding "it sure would be handy".
