= Glenn, Missouri =

Unincorporated community in Ripley County, Missouri

Coordinates: 36.5303372°N 90.6842837°W

Glenn is an unincorporated community in southeastern Ripley County, in the U.S. state of Missouri.

The community is located on Missouri Route H, just southwest of Torch.

== History ==
A post office called Glenn was established in 1901, and remained in operation until 1933. The community has the name of Glenn Hess, the son of an early settler.
