= Burr, Missouri =

Unincorporated community in the U.S. state of Missouri

Coordinates: 36°30′07″N 90°59′10″W

Burr is an unincorporated community in Ripley County, in the U.S. state of Missouri.

== History ==
A post office called Burr was established in 1898, and remained in operation until 1920. The community has the name of Moses Burr, a local merchant.
