= Gamburg, Missouri =

Unincorporated community in Missouri, U.S.

Coordinates: 36°38′14″N 90°38′24″W

Gamburg is an unincorporated community in Ripley County, in the U.S. state of Missouri.

== History ==
A post office called Gamburg was established in 1880, and remained in operation until 1931. The community derives its name from the last name of the local Gamblin family.
