= Bardley, Missouri =

Unincorporated community on the Oregon/Ripley county line in Missouri

Coordinates: 36°41′39″N 91°07′18″W

Bardley is an unincorporated community on the Oregon/Ripley county line in the U.S. state of Missouri. It is located on Missouri Route J approximately two miles north of U.S. Route 160 and fourteen miles east of Alton.

== History ==
Bardley had its start in 1895 as a logging town. The community was named after Bordley, Kentucky, the native home of a first settler (a postal error accounts for the error in spelling, which was never corrected). A post office called Bardley was established in 1895, and remained in operation until 1966.
