= Flatwoods, Missouri =

Unincorporated community in the U.S. state of Missouri

Coordinates: 36°40′50″N 90°42′01″W

Flatwoods is an unincorporated community in Ripley County, in the U.S. state of Missouri.

== History ==
A post office called Flatwoods was established in 1900, and remained in operation until 1954. The community was descriptively named for flatwoods near the original town site.
