= Doyle, Missouri =

Unincorporated community in Ripley County, Missouri

Coordinates: 36°35′59″N 90°54′35″W

Doyle is an unincorporated community in Ripley County, in the U.S. state of Missouri.

== History ==
A post office called Doyle was established in 1899, and remained in operation until 1916. The community has the name of Calvin Doyle, a local merchant.
