= Owenmont, Missouri =

Unincorporated community in the U.S. state of Missouri

Coordinates: 36°37′12″N 90°47′01″W

Owenmont is an unincorporated community in Ripley County, in the U.S. state of Missouri.

== History ==
A post office called Owenmont was established in 1911, and remained in operation until 1925. The community has the name of George Owen, a businessperson in the local lumber industry.
