= Beaverdam, Missouri =

Unincorporated community in Ripley County, Missouri

Coordinates: 36°45′11″N 90°37′51″W

Beaverdam is an unincorporated community in Ripley County, in the U.S. state of Missouri.

== History ==
A post office called Beaverdam was established in 1895, and remained in operation until 1897. The community takes its name from Beaverdam Creek.
