= Runaway Bay, Texas =

- City
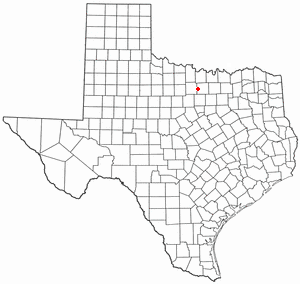
- Location of Runaway Bay, Texas

- Coordinates: 33°10′34″N 97°52′34″W
- Country: United States
- State: Texas
- County: Wise

Area
  - Total: 6.79 sq mi (17.58 km^{2})
  - Land: 2.52 sq mi (6.52 km^{2})
  - Water: 4.27 sq mi (11.05 km^{2})
- Elevation: 833 ft (254 m)

Population (2020)
  - Total: 1,546
  - Density: 614/sq mi (237/km^{2})
- Time zone: UTC-6 (Central (CST))
  - Summer (DST): UTC-5 (CDT)
- ZIP code: 76426
- Area code: 940
- FIPS code: 48-63782
- GNIS feature ID: 2411015
- Website: runawaybaytexas.com

Runaway Bay is a city in Wise County, Texas, lying at the Southern end of Lake Bridgeport. The population was 1,546 in 2020. On April 25, 2026, a tornado struck the town causing significant damage and killing one person.

== Geography ==
According to the United States Census Bureau, the city has a total area of 6.8 square miles (18 km^{2}), of which, 2.5 square miles (6.5 km^{2}) of it is land and 4.3 square miles (11 km^{2}) is water.

== Demographics ==
Historical population
Census	Pop.	Note	%±
1980	504		—
1990	700		38.9%
2000	1,104		57.7%
2010	1,286		16.5%
2020	1,546		20.2%
2023 (est.)	1,990		28.7%
U.S. Decennial Census

=== 2020 census ===
As of the 2020 census, Runaway Bay had a population of 1,546, 644 households, and 501 families residing in the city.

The median age was 49.0 years, 18.9% of residents were under 18, and 27.0% were 65 or older. For every 100 females there were 103.4 males, and for every 100 females 18 and over, there were 101.0 males 18 and over.

Of the 644 households in Runaway Bay, 24.2% had children under 18 living in them, 59.3% were married-couple households, 16.6% were households with a male householder and no spouse or partner present, and 18.9% were households with a female householder and no spouse or partner present. About 25.4% of all households were made up of individuals, and 11.8% had someone living alone who was 65 or older.

The city had 733 housing units, of which 12.1% were vacant. The homeowner vacancy rate was 2.5% and the rental vacancy rate was 10.4%.

None of the residents lived in urban areas, while 100.0% lived in rural areas.

Racial composition as of the 2020 census
Race	Number	Percentage
White	1,365	88.3%
Black or African American	14	0.9%
American Indian and Alaska Native	14	0.9%
Asian	8	0.5%
Native Hawaiian and other Pacific Islander	1	0.1%
Some other race	32	2.1%
Two or more races	112	7.2%
Hispanic or Latino (of any race)	153	9.9%

== Golf course ==
The Club at Runaway Bay was an 18-hole golf course and club house designed by Leon Howard and established in 1969. It was par-72, 7032-yard course and had a course rating of 73.1. It was featured in the 2008–09 edition of Golf Digest as one of the "Best Places to Play." The course closed on November 3, 2024.

=== Alleged chupacabra sighting ===
In 2010, the golf course was the site of a chupacabra sighting in which the unidentified dead animal was described as a "brown, earth-colored creature is hairless with oversized canines and elongated padded feet with inch-long toes tapered with sharp, curved claws. The creature also had long hind legs." Upon investigation, a biologist with the Texas Parks and Wildlife Department identified the animal as a hairless raccoon.

== Education ==
The City of Runaway Bay is served by the Bridgeport Independent School District with some minor parts of the city extending to Jacksboro Independent School District.

== Highways ==
- US 380
- SH 114
