= Oxly, Missouri =

- Census-Designated Place
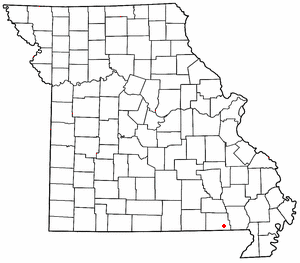
- Location of Oxly in Missouri
- Coordinates: 36°36′09″N 90°40′44″W
- Country: United States
- State: Missouri
- County: Ripley
- Elevation: 400 ft (120 m)
- FIPS code: 29-55694
- GNIS feature ID: 2587099

Oxly is a census-designated place in southeastern Ripley County, Missouri, United States. It is located on Logan Creek along Missouri Route 142, approximately seven miles east of Doniphan.

A post office called Oxly has been in operation since 1900. The community has the name of F. G. Oxley, a businessperson in the local lumber industry.

== Climate ==
Climate is characterized by relatively high temperatures and evenly distributed precipitation throughout the year. The Köppen Climate Classification subtype for this climate is "Cfa" (Humid Subtropical Climate).

Climate data for Oxly, Missouri
Month	Jan	Feb	Mar	Apr	May	Jun	Jul	Aug	Sep	Oct	Nov	Dec	Year
Mean daily maximum °C (°F)	8 (46)	11 (51)	16 (61)	22 (72)	27 (80)	31 (88)	33 (92)	33 (91)	29 (84)	23 (73)	16 (60)	9 (48)	21 (70)
Mean daily minimum °C (°F)	−6 (21)	−4 (25)	1 (33)	6 (42)	11 (52)	16 (61)	18 (65)	17 (63)	13 (55)	6 (42)	0 (32)	−4 (24)	6 (43)
Average precipitation mm (inches)	91 (3.6)	86 (3.4)	120 (4.6)	120 (4.9)	120 (4.9)	99 (3.9)	99 (3.9)	94 (3.7)	99 (3.9)	84 (3.3)	100 (4.1)	71 (2.8)	1,200 (48)
Source: Weatherbase
