= Ripley County Courthouse (Missouri) =

- U.S. National Register of Historic Places
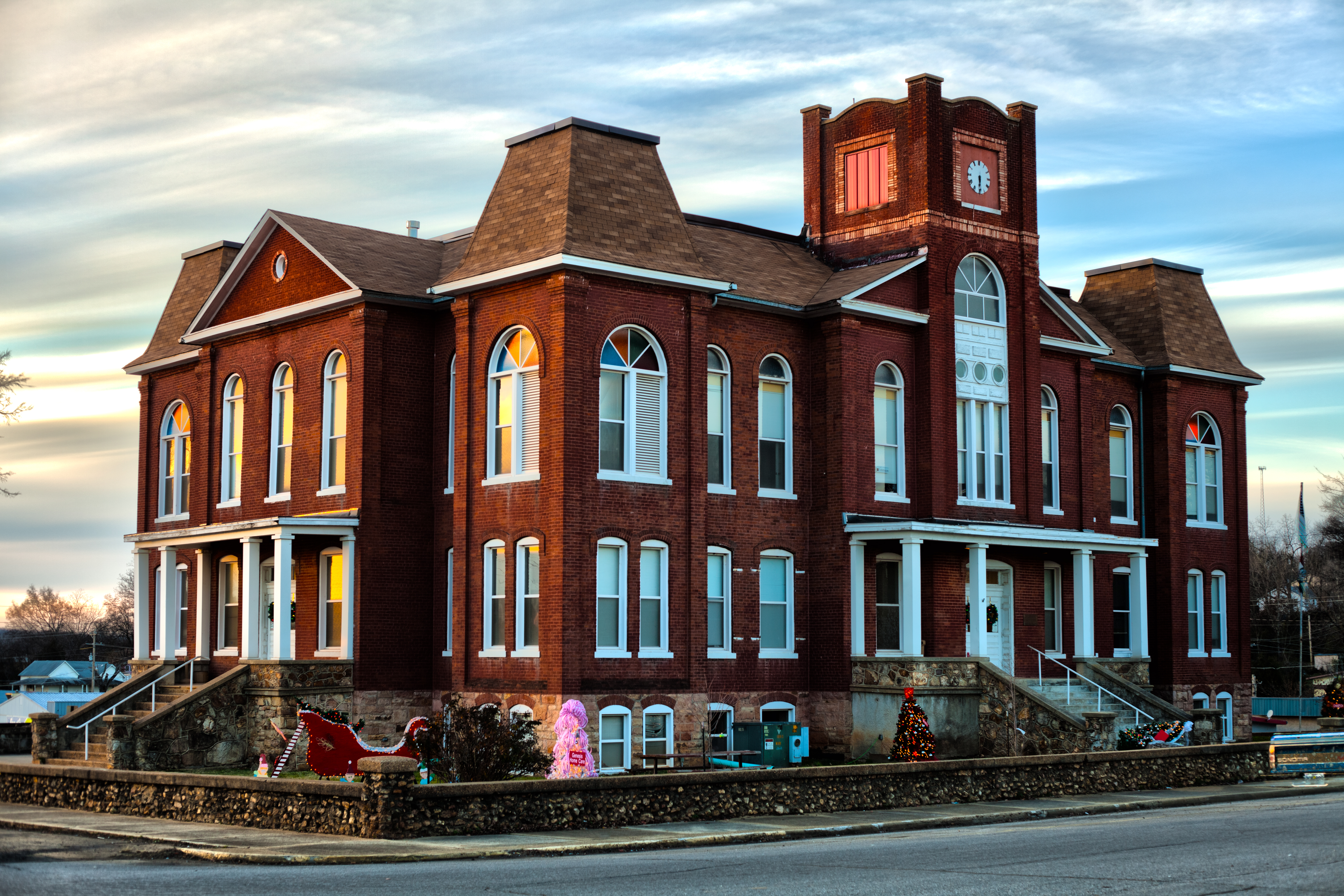
- Ripley County Courthouse, December 2014

- Location within Missouri Location within the United States
- Interactive map showing the location of Ripley County Courthouse
- Location: Courthouse Circle, Doniphan, Missouri
- Coordinates: 36°37′4″N 90°49′37″W
- Area: 1.5 acres (0.61 ha)
- Built: 1899
- Built by: Anderson, John M.
- Architect: Schrage, William F.
- Architectural style: Second Empire
- NRHP reference No.: 76001116
- Added to NRHP: November 7, 1976

Ripley County Courthouse is a historic courthouse located at Doniphan, Ripley County, Missouri. It was built in 1899, and is a two-story, brick building on a stone foundation with Second Empire style design influences. It has a central clock tower and corner pavilions with mansard roofs.

It was added to the National Register of Historic Places in 1976.
