= Naylor, Missouri =

- City
- Location of Naylor, Missouri
- Coordinates: 36°34′28″N 90°36′20″W
- Country: United States
- State: Missouri
- County: Ripley

Area
  - Total: 0.55 sq mi (1.43 km^{2})
  - Land: 0.55 sq mi (1.43 km^{2})
  - Water: 0 sq mi (0.00 km^{2})
- Elevation: 308 ft (94 m)

Population (2020)
  - Total: 440
  - Density: 795/sq mi (306.9/km^{2})
- Time zone: UTC-6 (Central (CST))
  - Summer (DST): UTC-5 (CDT)
- ZIP code: 63953
- Area code: 573
- FIPS code: 29-51302
- GNIS feature ID: 2395161

Naylor is a city in southeastern Ripley County, Missouri, United States. The population was 440 at the 2020 census.

== History ==
Naylor was originally called Barfield, and under the latter name had its start when the railroad was extended to that point. A post office called Naylor has been in operation since 1892. The present name is after William A. Naylor, a businessperson in the lumber industry.

== Geography ==
Naylor is located in the southeast corner of the county 1.5 miles from the Ripley-Butler county line and approximately 5 miles north of the Missouri-Arkansas state line. Doniphan is about 12 miles to the west-northwest. The Little Black River flows past 1.5 miles to the northwest.

According to the United States Census Bureau, the city has a total area of 0.55 square miles (1.42 km^{2}), all land.

== Demographics ==
Historical population
Census	Pop.	Note	%±
1900	202		—
1910	406		101.0%
1920	681		67.7%
1930	553		−18.8%
1940	507		−8.3%
1950	520		2.6%
1960	499		−4.0%
1970	586		17.4%
1980	602		2.7%
1990	642		6.6%
2000	610		−5.0%
2010	632		3.6%
2020	440		−30.4%
U.S. Decennial Census

=== 2010 census ===
As of the census of 2010, there were 632 people, 270 households, and 172 families living in the city. The population density was 1,149.1 inhabitants per square mile (443.7/km^{2}). There were 290 housing units at an average density of 527.3 per square mile (203.6/km^{2}). The racial makeup of the city was 93.51% White, 0.32% Black or African American, 0.79% Native American, 0.16% from other races, and 5.22% from two or more races. Hispanic or Latino of any race were 0.95% of the population.

There were 270 households, of which 29.6% had children under the age of 18 living with them, 45.9% were married couples living together, 11.9% had a female householder with no husband present, 5.9% had a male householder with no wife present, and 36.3% were non-families. 31.5% of all households were made up of individuals, and 17.4% had someone living alone who was 65 years of age or older. The average household size was 2.34 and the average family size was 2.88.

The median age in the city was 42.3 years. 23.4% of residents were under the age of 18; 8.4% were between the ages of 18 and 24; 20.7% were from 25 to 44; 26.2% were from 45 to 64; and 21.4% were 65 years of age or older. The gender makeup of the city was 48.3% male and 51.7% female.

=== 2000 census ===
As of the census of 2000, there were 610 people, 255 households, and 177 families living in the city. The population density was 1,124.6 inhabitants per square mile (434.2/km^{2}). There were 317 housing units at an average density of 584.4 per square mile (225.6/km^{2}). The racial makeup of the city was 94.43% White, 0.16% African American, 2.95% Native American, 0.33% Asian, and 2.13% from two or more races. Hispanic or Latino of any race were 2.46% of the population.

There were 255 households, out of which 32.2% had children under the age of 18 living with them, 52.5% were married couples living together, 14.9% had a female householder with no husband present, and 30.2% were non-families. 28.6% of all households were made up of individuals, and 17.3% had someone living alone who was 65 years of age or older. The average household size was 2.39 and the average family size was 2.91.

In the city the population was spread out, with 26.1% under the age of 18, 8.9% from 18 to 24, 23.1% from 25 to 44, 22.3% from 45 to 64, and 19.7% who were 65 years of age or older. The median age was 39 years. For every 100 females there were 81.5 males. For every 100 females age 18 and over, there were 76.2 males.

The median income for a household in the city was $20,900, and the median income for a family was $26,250. Males had a median income of $21,438 versus $18,500 for females. The per capita income for the city was $18,402. About 19.2% of families and 24.1% of the population were below the poverty line, including 28.7% of those under age 18 and 18.9% of those age 65 or over.

== Education ==
Public education in Naylor is administered by the Naylor R-II School District.

Naylor has a public library, the Naylor Branch Library.

== Notable person ==
- Ernest Lenard Hall, the first Paul. E. Geier Professor of Robotics in the Department of Mechanical Engineering at the University of Cincinnati.
