= Sinsabaugh, Missouri =

Unincorporated community in the U.S. state of Missouri

Coordinates: 36°30′16″N 90°42′07″W

Sinsabaugh is an unincorporated community in southeastern Ripley County, in the U.S. state of Missouri.

The community is located just east of Missouri Route H and one-half mile north of the Missouri-Arkansas state line.

== History ==
A variant name was "Acorn". A post office called Acorn was established in 1902, and remained in operation until 1937. The present name is after D.A. Sinsabaugh, a businessperson in the local lumber industry.
