= Ripley County, Missouri =

County in Missouri, United States

- County
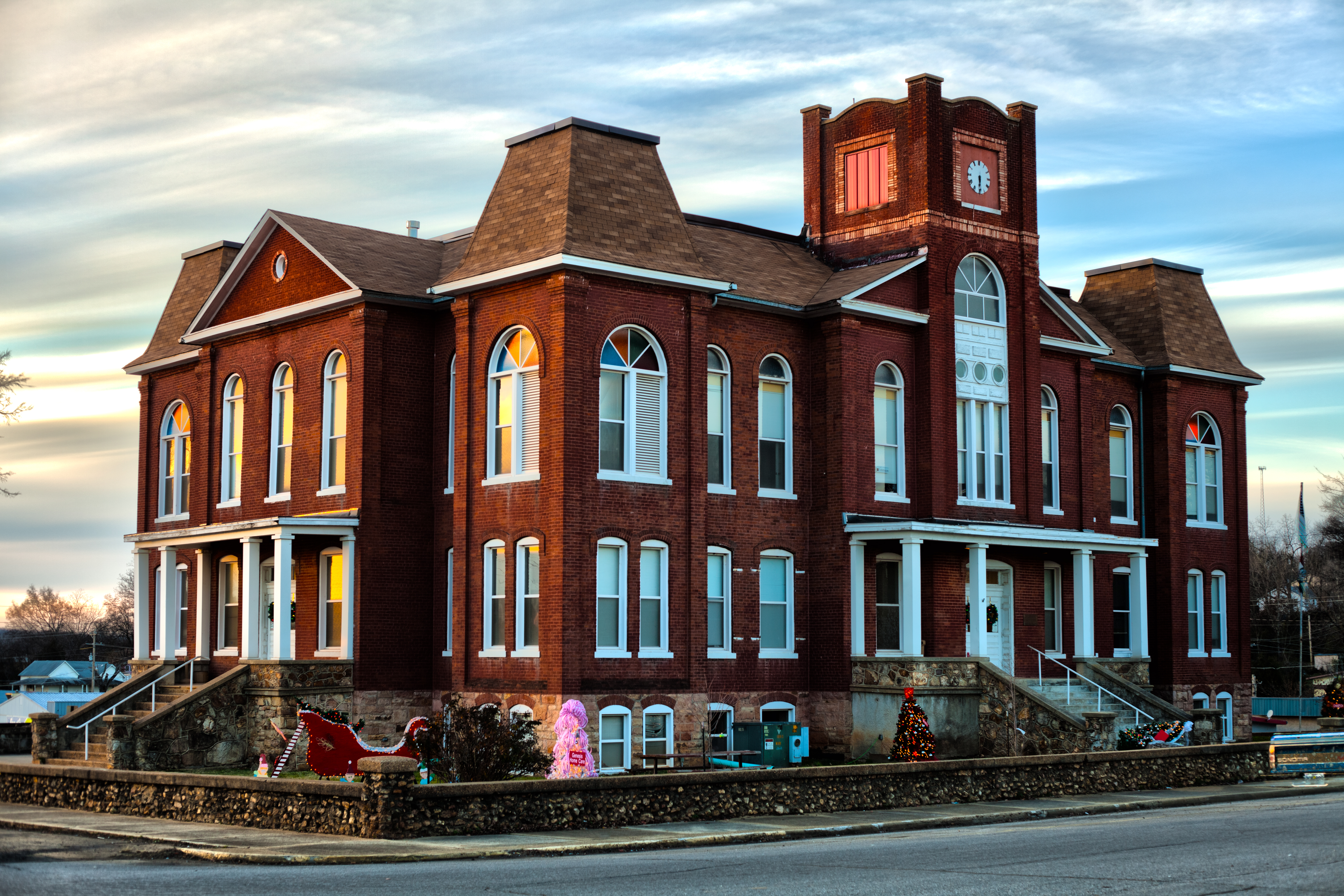
- Ripley County Courthouse in Doniphan

- Location within the U.S. state of Missouri
- Coordinates: 36°40′N 90°52′W
- Country: United States
- State: Missouri
- Founded: January 5, 1833
- Named for: Eleazer Wheelock Ripley
- Seat: Doniphan
- Largest city: Doniphan

Area
  - Total: 632 sq mi (1,640 km^{2})
  - Land: 630 sq mi (1,600 km^{2})
  - Water: 2.1 sq mi (5.4 km^{2})

Population (2020)
  - Total: 10,679
  - Estimate (2025): 10,717 ▲
  - Density: 17/sq mi (6.5/km^{2})
- Time zone: UTC−6 (Central)
  - Summer (DST): UTC−5 (CDT)
- Congressional district: 8th
- Website: www.ripleycountymissouri.org

Ripley County is a county in the Ozarks of Missouri. At the 2020 census, it had a population of 10,679. The largest city and county seat is Doniphan. The county was officially organized on January 5, 1833, and is named after Brigadier General Eleazer Wheelock Ripley, a soldier who served with distinction in the War of 1812.

The original area included what would later become Oregon, Howell, Shannon and Carter counties. The historic Natchitoches Trail passes through Ripley County. It was a Native American trail to the Southwest that was used by pioneers, including Stephen F. Austin. During the American Civil War, Ripley County was strongly pro-Southern and provided four colonels for the Confederate Army. Several Civil War skirmishes took place in the county. Tourist areas include the Current River and the Mark Twain National Forest.

== History ==
Located deep in the rugged, wooded hills of Southern Missouri, the area remained sparsely settled throughout the 19th century. Although organized in 1833, the county did not assume its present size until 1872.

When Congress created the Territory of Missouri in 1812, what became Ripley County was in New Madrid County. Three years later, Lawrence County was established, which included all of southern Missouri west of the St. Francis River and a portion of northern Arkansas. The seat of justice for Lawrence County was at Davidsonville in present-day Arkansas. In 1818 Wayne County was formed. This massive county included nearly one-fifth of the area in the Missouri Territory, with Greenville becoming the county seat.

In 1833 the General Assembly created Ripley County from part of Wayne County. The county then included present-day Ripley, Carter, Shannon, Oregon, and Howell Counties, with Van Buren as the county seat. Over the next 26 years, Ripley County's boundaries decreased as new counties were formed: Shannon (1841), Oregon, which included today's Oregon and Howell Counties (1845), and Carter (1859). The last boundary change took place in 1872.

Since most of the population lived in the south, voters moved the county seat to the new Doniphan, where a wooden courthouse was built. This building served the county until it was burned by Union troops, along with almost entire town of Doniphan, on September 19, 1864. William Russell, a county official, had earlier removed the county's record books and hid them in a cave south of town. They remained there until they were retrieved by the county clerk two years after the war.

Because of the chaos and destruction brought about by the Civil War, the courthouse was not replaced until 1871. A two-story brick courthouse was then built, using the $10,000 bond passed by the voters. It housed the administrative offices until it was destroyed by an accidental fire in January 1898.

Ripley County's current courthouse was designed by William F. Schrage of Kansas City, and was built by John McDonald Anderson of Emporia, Kansas in 1898–1899. A central tower, later destroyed during a 1929 tornado, dominated the two-story brick structure. Federal relief workers made repairs and renovations of the courthouse during the 1930s. An extensive remodeling project in the 1970s added central heating. The century-old courthouse is now listed on the National Register of Historic Places and celebrated its centennial during the 1999 Labor Day Homecoming Festivities.

== Geography ==
According to the U.S. Census Bureau, the county has a total area of 632 square miles (1,640 km^{2}), of which 630 square miles (1,600 km^{2}) is land and 2.1 square miles (5.4 km^{2}) (0.3%) is water.

=== Adjacent counties ===
- Carter County (north)
- Butler County (east)
- Clay County, Arkansas (southeast)
- Randolph County, Arkansas (southwest)
- Oregon County (west)

=== Major highways ===
- U.S. Route 160
- Route 21
- Route 142

=== National protected area ===
- Mark Twain National Forest (part)

== Demographics ==
Historical population
Census	Pop.	Note	%±
1840	2,856		—
1850	2,830		−0.9%
1860	3,747		32.4%
1870	3,175		−15.3%
1880	5,377		69.4%
1890	8,512		58.3%
1900	13,186		54.9%
1910	13,099		−0.7%
1920	12,061		−7.9%
1930	11,176		−7.3%
1940	12,606		12.8%
1950	11,414		−9.5%
1960	9,096		−20.3%
1970	9,803		7.8%
1980	12,458		27.1%
1990	12,303		−1.2%
2000	13,509		9.8%
2010	14,100		4.4%
2020	10,679		−24.3%
2025 (est.)	10,717	▲	0.4%
U.S. Decennial Census; 1790-1960 1900-1990; 1990-2000 2010-2015

=== 2020 census ===
As of the 2020 census, the county had a population of 10,679. The median age was 44.8 years. 22.4% of residents were under the age of 18 and 22.7% of residents were 65 years of age or older. For every 100 females there were 93.8 males, and for every 100 females age 18 and over there were 92.7 males age 18 and over. The county remained majority White in 2020, while smaller populations of Black or African American, Native American, Asian, Native Hawaiian or Pacific Islander, and other or multiracial residents were also recorded; Hispanic or Latino residents of any race made up a small share of the population. Detailed counts are shown in the table below.

Ripley County, Missouri – Racial and ethnic composition Note: the US Census treats Hispanic/Latino as an ethnic category. This table excludes Latinos from the racial categories and assigns them to a separate category. Hispanics/Latinos may be of any race.
Race / Ethnicity (NH = Non-Hispanic)	Pop 1980	Pop 1990	Pop 2000	Pop 2010	Pop 2020	% 1980	% 1990	% 2000	% 2010	% 2020
White alone (NH)	12,326	12,150	13,019	13,563	9,885	98.94%	98.76%	96.37%	96.19%	92.56%
Black or African American alone (NH)	10	6	5	49	31	0.08%	0.05%	0.04%	0.35%	0.29%
Native American or Alaska Native alone (NH)	27	49	170	122	44	0.22%	0.40%	1.26%	0.87%	0.41%
Asian alone (NH)	11	19	30	44	28	0.09%	0.15%	0.22%	0.31%	0.26%
Native Hawaiian or Pacific Islander alone (NH)	x	x	2	0	1	x	x	0.01%	0.00%	0.01%
Other race alone (NH)	0	1	0	4	1	0.00%	0.01%	0.00%	0.03%	0.01%
Mixed race or Multiracial (NH)	x	x	151	176	562	x	x	1.12%	1.25%	5.26%
Hispanic or Latino (any race)	84	78	132	142	127	0.67%	0.63%	0.98%	1.01%	1.19%
Total	12,458	12,303	13,509	14,100	10,679	100.00%	100.00%	100.00%	100.00%	100.00%

0.0% of residents lived in urban areas, while 100.0% lived in rural areas.

There were 4,380 households in the county, of which 26.9% had children under the age of 18 living with them and 27.2% had a female householder with no spouse or partner present. About 30.4% of all households were made up of individuals and 15.0% had someone living alone who was 65 years of age or older.

There were 5,145 housing units, of which 14.9% were vacant. Among occupied housing units, 76.4% were owner-occupied and 23.6% were renter-occupied. The homeowner vacancy rate was 2.3% and the rental vacancy rate was 12.9%.

=== 2000 census ===
As of the 2000 census, there were 13,509 people, 5,416 households, and 3,845 families residing in the county. The population density was 22 people per square mile (8.5 people/km^{2}). There were 6,392 housing units at an average density of 10 units per square mile (3.9/km^{2}). The racial makeup of the county was 97.17% White, 0.04% Black or African American, 1.33% Native American, 0.22% Asian, 0.01% Pacific Islander, 0.05% from other races, and 1.17% from two or more races. Approximately 0.98% of the population were Hispanic or Latino of any race. The major first ancestries reported in Ripley County were 34.1% American, 14.0% Irish, 11.6% German and 10.7% English.

There were 5,416 households, out of which 30.30% had children under the age of 18 living with them, 57.40% were married couples living together, 9.60% had a female householder with no husband present, and 29.00% were non-families. 25.90% of all households were made up of individuals, and 13.30% had someone living alone who was 65 years of age or older. The average household size was 2.46 and the average family size was 2.95.

In the county, the population was spread out, with 24.80% under the age of 18, 7.90% from 18 to 24, 25.30% from 25 to 44, 24.70% from 45 to 64, and 17.30% who were 65 years of age or older. The median age was 39 years. For every 100 females there were 94.30 males. For every 100 females age 18 and over, there were 93.10 males.

The median income for a household in the county was $27,285, and the median income for a family was $33,101. Males had a median income of $22,056 versus $17,823 for females. The per capita income for the county was $15,251. About 16.90% of families and 22.00% of the population were below the poverty line, including 27.00% of those under age 18 and 20.40% of those age 65 or over.

At the end of 2008, the unemployment rate in Ripley County was 6.4%.

=== Income ===
In 2025, the Bureau of Labor Statistics cited Ripley County as having the second lowest average weekly wage per person out of all Missouri counties, at $611 per week (behind only Ozark County, whose average weekly wage per person was $610).

== Politics ==
=== Local ===
The Republican Party mostly controls politics at the local level in Ripley County. Republicans hold over half of the elected positions in the county.

Ripley County, Missouri

Elected countywide officials
Assessor	Jan Spencer	Democratic
Circuit Clerk	Sharon R. Richmond	Republican
County Clerk	Becky York	Democratic
Collector	Marcia Tackett	Republican
Commissioner (presiding)	Jesse Roy	Republican
Commissioner (district 1)	Gary Emmons	Republican
Commissioner (district 2)	Andy Towell	Republican
Coroner	Mike Jackson	Democratic
Prosecuting Attorney	Edward Thompson	Democratic
Public Administrator	Brenda Emmons-Thompson	Republican
Recorder	June Watson	Democratic
Sheriff	Rad Talburt	Republican
Surveyor	William Troy Ayers	Republican
Treasurer	Terry L. Slayton	Republican

=== State ===
All of Ripley County is a part of Missouri's 153rd District and is currently represented by Steve Cookson (R-Poplar Bluff).

Missouri House of Representatives — District 153 — Ripley County (2016)
Party	Candidate	Votes	%	±%
Republican	Steve Cookson	3,692	68.69%	−10.23
Democratic	Matt Michel	1,683	32.31%	+32.31

Missouri House of Representatives — District 153 — Ripley County (2014)
Party	Candidate	Votes	%	±%
Republican	Steve Cookson	2,007	78.92%	+3.18
Libertarian	Ginny Keirns	536	21.08%	+21.08

Missouri House of Representatives — District 153 — Ripley County (2012)
Party	Candidate	Votes	%	±%
Republican	Steve Cookson	3,796	75.74%	
Independent	Jack (Skip) Johnson	1,216	24.26%	

All of Ripley County is a part of Missouri's 33rd District in the Missouri Senate and is currently represented by Mike Cunninghma (R-Rogersville).

Missouri Senate — District 33 — Ripley County (2016)
Party	Candidate	Votes	%	±%
Republican	Mike Cunningham	4,669	100.00%	

Missouri Senate — District 33 — Ripley County (2012)
Party	Candidate	Votes	%	±%
Republican	Mike Cunningham	4,410	100.00%	

Past Gubernatorial Elections Results
Year	Republican	Democratic	Third Parties
2024	85.61% 4,872	12.51% 712	1.88% 97
2020	82.05% 4,629	15.93% 899	2.03% 114
2016	73.17% 3,959	24.23% 1,311	2.60% 141
2012	54.29% 2,822	42.63% 2,216	3.08% 160
2008	47.09% 2,499	49.75% 2,640	3.17% 168
2004	59.85% 3,332	38.37% 2,136	1.78% 99
2000	53.19% 2,651	44.36% 2,211	2.45% 122
1996	38.80% 1,801	58.97% 2,738	2.24% 104
1992	45.47% 2,155	54.53% 2,584	0.00% 0
1988	62.64% 2,840	37.25% 1,689	0.11% 5
1984	56.91% 2,665	43.09% 2,018	0.00% 0
1980	53.25% 2,510	46.71% 2,202	0.04% 2
1976	47.30% 1,972	52.53% 2,190	0.17% 7

=== Federal ===
U.S. Senate — Missouri — Ripley County (2016)
Party	Candidate	Votes	%	±%
Republican	Roy Blunt	3,814	70.85%	+17.54
Democratic	Jason Kander	1,340	24.89%	−16.41
Libertarian	Jonathan Dine	100	1.86%	−3.53
Green	Johnathan McFarland	78	1.45%	+1.45
Constitution	Fred Ryman	49	0.91%	+0.91
Write-In	Patrick Lee	2	0.04%	+0.04

U.S. Senate — Missouri — Ripley County (2012)
Party	Candidate	Votes	%	±%
Republican	Todd Akin	2,771	53.31%	
Democratic	Claire McCaskill	2,147	41.30%	
Libertarian	Jonathan Dine	280	5.39%	

Ripley County is included in Missouri's 8th Congressional District and is represented by Jason T. Smith (R-Salem) in the House of Representatives. Smith won a special election on Tuesday, June 4, 2013, to finish out the remaining term of U.S. Representative Jo Ann Emerson (R-Cape Girardeau). Emerson announced her resignation a month after being reelected with over 70 percent of the vote in the district. She resigned to become CEO of the National Rural Electric Cooperative.

U.S. House of Representatives — Missouri's 8th Congressional District — Ripley County (2016)
Party	Candidate	Votes	%	±%
Republican	Jason T. Smith	4,224	80.18%	+9.42
Democratic	Dave Cowell	903	17.14%	−3.87
Libertarian	Jonathan Shell	141	2.68%	+1.18

U.S. House of Representatives — Missouri's 8th Congressional District — Ripley County (2014)
Party	Candidate	Votes	%	±%
Republican	Jason T. Smith	3,911	70.76%	+0.37
Democratic	Barbara Stocker	547	21.01%	−3.68
Libertarian	Rick Vandeven	39	1.50%	−0.20
Constitution	Doug Enyart	48	1.84%	−1.38
Independent	Terry Hampton	127	4.88%	+4.88

U.S. House of Representatives — Missouri's 8th Congressional District — Ripley County (Special Election2013)
Party	Candidate	Votes	%	±%
Republican	Jason T. Smith	744	70.39%	−4.94
Democratic	Steve Hodges	261	24.69%	+2.77
Libertarian	Bill Slantz	18	1.70%	−1.05
Constitution	Doug Enyart	34	3.22%	+3.22

U.S. House of Representatives — Missouri's 8th Congressional District — Ripley County (2012)
Party	Candidate	Votes	%	±%
Republican	Jo Ann Emerson	3,911	75.33%	
Democratic	Jack Rushin	1,138	21.92%	
Libertarian	Rick Vandeven	143	2.75%	

==== Political culture ====
United States presidential election results for Ripley County, Missouri
Year	Republican		Democratic		Third party(ies)	
Year	No.	%	No.	%	No.	%
1888	507	36.40%	805	57.79%	81	5.81%
1892	446	30.46%	812	55.46%	206	14.07%
1896	749	34.12%	1,442	65.69%	4	0.18%
1900	822	35.23%	1,439	61.68%	72	3.09%
1904	781	39.15%	1,089	54.59%	125	6.27%
1908	946	40.95%	1,309	56.67%	55	2.38%
1912	651	26.67%	1,249	51.17%	541	22.16%
1916	1,053	42.19%	1,325	53.08%	118	4.73%
1920	1,752	47.66%	1,735	47.20%	189	5.14%
1924	1,428	41.71%	1,863	54.41%	133	3.88%
1928	2,226	61.31%	1,395	38.42%	10	0.28%
1932	1,139	29.71%	2,600	67.81%	95	2.48%
1936	1,911	43.46%	2,466	56.08%	20	0.45%
1940	2,291	48.49%	2,419	51.20%	15	0.32%
1944	1,841	48.72%	1,923	50.89%	15	0.40%
1948	1,533	39.74%	2,304	59.72%	21	0.54%
1952	2,444	52.56%	2,194	47.18%	12	0.26%
1956	2,189	50.46%	2,149	49.54%	0	0.00%
1960	2,811	62.08%	1,717	37.92%	0	0.00%
1964	1,684	38.52%	2,688	61.48%	0	0.00%
1968	1,973	48.24%	1,440	35.21%	677	16.55%
1972	2,810	67.37%	1,361	32.63%	0	0.00%
1976	1,640	38.63%	2,577	60.71%	28	0.66%
1980	2,524	52.97%	2,156	45.25%	85	1.78%
1984	2,927	60.85%	1,883	39.15%	0	0.00%
1988	2,647	57.29%	1,961	42.45%	12	0.26%
1992	1,814	37.33%	2,300	47.33%	746	15.35%
1996	1,988	42.68%	2,081	44.68%	589	12.64%
2000	3,121	61.62%	1,820	35.93%	124	2.45%
2004	3,693	65.33%	1,907	33.73%	53	0.94%
2008	3,407	63.53%	1,795	33.47%	161	3.00%
2012	3,743	71.12%	1,396	26.52%	124	2.36%
2016	4,522	81.86%	830	15.03%	172	3.11%
2020	4,839	84.64%	833	14.57%	45	0.79%
2024	5,002	86.18%	763	13.15%	39	0.67%

At the presidential level, Ripley County is heavily Republican, typical of rural counties within the Upland South. While George W. Bush carried Ripley County by two-to-one margins in 2000 and 2004, Bill Clinton won the county both times in 1992 and 1996. Like most of the rural counties in Missouri, Ripley County favored John McCain over Barack Obama in 2008. Trump won the county by 70% of the vote in 2020.

Like most rural areas throughout Southeast Missouri, voters in Ripley County generally adhere to socially and culturally conservative principles which tend to influence their Republican leanings. In 2004, Missourians voted on a constitutional amendment to define marriage as the union between a man and a woman—it overwhelmingly passed Ripley County with 89.06 percent of the vote. The initiative passed the state with 71 percent of support from voters as Missouri became the first state to ban same-sex marriage. In 2006, Missourians voted on a constitutional amendment to fund and legalize embryonic stem cell research in the state—it failed in Ripley County with 57.39 percent voting against the measure. The initiative narrowly passed the state with 51 percent of support from voters as Missouri became one of the first states in the nation to approve embryonic stem cell research. Despite Ripley County's longstanding tradition of supporting socially conservative platforms, voters in the county have a penchant for advancing populist causes like increasing the minimum wage. In 2006, Missourians voted on a proposition (Proposition B) to increase the minimum wage in the state to $6.50 an hour—it passed Ripley County with 75.08 percent of the vote. The proposition strongly passed every single county in Missouri with 75.94 percent voting in favor as the minimum wage was increased to $6.50 an hour in the state. During the same election, voters in five other states also strongly approved increases in the minimum wage.

=== Missouri presidential preference primary (2008) ===
In the 2008 presidential primary, voters in Ripley County from both political parties supported candidates who finished in second place in the state at large and nationally. Then U.S. Senator Hillary Clinton (D-New York) received her fourth strongest showing in the Democratic Primary of 2008 in Ripley County; she only did better in Dunklin, Wayne and Carter counties. Also, she received more votes, a total of 1,073, than any candidate from either party in Ripley County during the 2008 presidential primary.

== Education ==
Of adults 25 years of age and older in Ripley County, 62.1% possesses a high school diploma or higher while 7.8% holds a bachelor's degree or higher as their highest educational attainment.

=== Public schools ===
- Current River Area Vocational School – Doniphan – (09-12)
- Doniphan R-I School District – Doniphan
  - Doniphan Elementary School (K-02)
  - Doniphan Intermediate School (03-05)
  - Doniphan Middle School (06-08)
  - Doniphan High School (09-12)
- Naylor R-II School District – Naylor
  - Naylor Elementary School (K-06)
  - Naylor High School (07-12)
- Ripley County (Gatewood) R-III School District – Gatewood – (K-08)
- Ripley County (Lone Star) R-IV School District – Doniphan

=== Private schools ===
- West Point Christian Academy – Doniphan – (K-11) – Assemblies of God/Pentecostal

=== Public libraries ===
- Doniphan-Ripley County Library

== Communities ==
=== Cities ===
- Doniphan (seat)
- Naylor

=== Census-designated places ===
- Fairdealing
- Oxly

=== Other unincorporated places ===
- Bardley
- Beaverdam
- Briar
- Budapest
- Burr
- Carie
- Current View
- Doyle
- Flatwoods
- Gamburg
- Gatewood
- Glenn
- Handy
- Hemenway
- Leibig
- Owenmont
- Pine
- Poynor
- Pratt
- Pulaski
- Purman
- Sinsabaugh
- Torch

== See also ==
- National Register of Historic Places listings in Ripley County, Missouri
