= Doniphan, Missouri =

City in Missouri, U.S.

- City
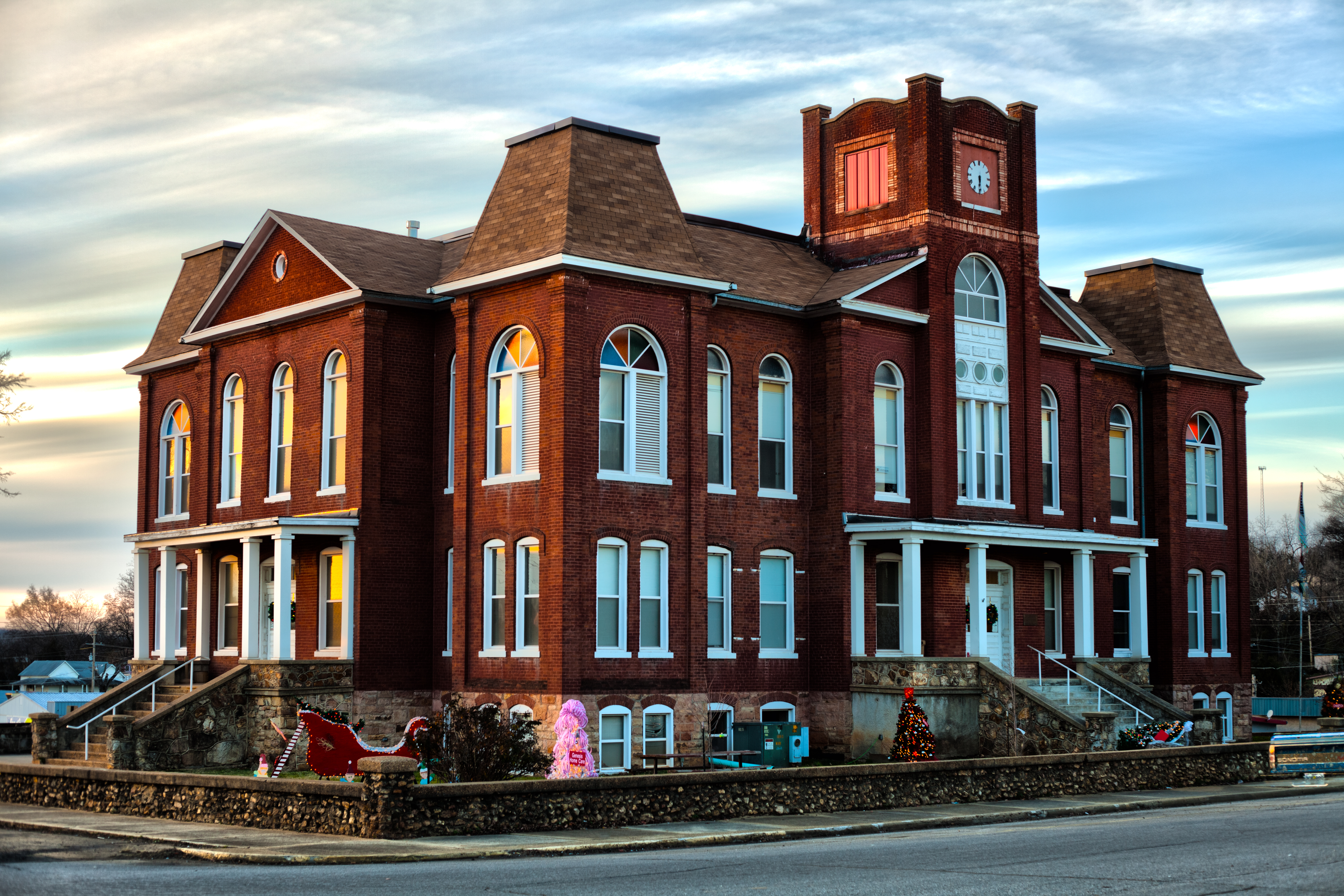
- Ripley County Courthouse

- Location of Doniphan, Missouri
- Coordinates: 36°37′24″N 90°49′20″W
- Country: United States
- State: Missouri
- County: Ripley

Area
  - Total: 1.38 sq mi (3.57 km^{2})
  - Land: 1.38 sq mi (3.57 km^{2})
  - Water: 0 sq mi (0.00 km^{2})
- Elevation: 381 ft (116 m)

Population (2020)
  - Total: 1,781
  - Density: 1,293.9/sq mi (499.57/km^{2})
- Time zone: UTC−6 (Central (CST))
  - Summer (DST): UTC−5 (CDT)
- ZIP code: 63935
- Area code: 573
- FIPS code: 29-19792
- GNIS feature ID: 2394544
- Website: www.doniphanmo.org

Doniphan is a city and the county seat of Ripley County, Missouri, United States, that is on the Current River. The population was 1,781 at the 2020 census.

== History ==
The first settlement at Doniphan was made in the 1840s. The community was named for Alexander William Doniphan. A post office called Doniphan has been in operation since 1848.

=== Early years ===
The earliest recorded permanent settlement in the area that would become Doniphan was that of Lemuel Kittrell in 1819. Kittrell built a grist and wood mill near his home that attracted additional settlers to the region. By 1841, the Kittrell settlement had grown to a sizeable village that included an inn, store, distillery, produce warehouse, tannery, justice of the peace and notary office, blacksmith, and a gunsmith.

The town of Doniphan was founded in 1847. Due to most of the population of Ripley County being concentrated in the southern half of the county, the county seat was moved from Van Buren to Doniphan the same year.

=== Civil War ===
Most residents of Southeast Missouri identified as southerners and sympathized with, or fought for, the Confederacy. During the winter of 1861–1862, the combination of harsh conditions and numerous skirmishes ruined crops and many families suffered. The residents of Doniphan were promised protection by Captain W. T. Leeper if they remained loyal to the Union, but the residents were mostly rebel sympathizers.

In 1862, Reverend Timothy Reeves, a Baptist minister in Doniphan, formed Reeves's Independent Company of Missouri Scouts, a militia group under the command of Confederate General John Sappington Marmaduke. On April 1, 1862, a skirmish lasting two days took place at the Doniphan Ford on Current River. Union forces were led by Captain Leeper, while pro-Confederate forces were led by Reverend Reeves. The skirmish resulted in many killed, wounded, or captured for both sides.

In 1863, Reeves combined his Independent Scouts with another militia group to form the 15th Missouri Cavalry Regiment, CSA.

In 1864, Union troops entered Doniphan and burned most of the town, including the wooden courthouse.

As of 1900, Doniphan was a sundown town that prohibited African Americans from living there.

== Geography ==
Doniphan is located in south-central Ripley County at the intersection of US Route 160 and Missouri Route 142. The Current River flows past the west side of the city.

According to the United States Census Bureau, the city has a total area of 1.38 square miles (3.57 km^{2}), all land.

=== Climate ===
Climate is characterized by relatively high temperatures and evenly distributed precipitation throughout the year. The Köppen climate classification subtype for this climate is "Cfa" (Humid Subtropical Climate).

Climate data for Doniphan, Missouri, 1991–2020 normals, extremes 1894–2017
| Month | Jan | Feb | Mar | Apr | May | Jun | Jul | Aug | Sep | Oct | Nov | Dec | Year |
|---|---|---|---|---|---|---|---|---|---|---|---|---|---|
| Record high °F (°C) | 77 (25) | 88 (31) | 92 (33) | 95 (35) | 100 (38) | 112 (44) | 110 (43) | 114 (46) | 106 (41) | 97 (36) | 85 (29) | 78 (26) | 114 (46) |
| Mean maximum °F (°C) | 66.2 (19.0) | 71.8 (22.1) | 79.4 (26.3) | 85.8 (29.9) | 89.7 (32.1) | 95.4 (35.2) | 99.0 (37.2) | 99.1 (37.3) | 93.8 (34.3) | 86.0 (30.0) | 76.6 (24.8) | 65.9 (18.8) | 100.6 (38.1) |
| Mean daily maximum °F (°C) | 45.9 (7.7) | 50.7 (10.4) | 60.1 (15.6) | 70.4 (21.3) | 77.9 (25.5) | 86.0 (30.0) | 89.6 (32.0) | 88.9 (31.6) | 82.4 (28.0) | 71.5 (21.9) | 58.6 (14.8) | 48.0 (8.9) | 69.2 (20.6) |
| Daily mean °F (°C) | 35.1 (1.7) | 39.0 (3.9) | 47.4 (8.6) | 57.3 (14.1) | 66.2 (19.0) | 74.8 (23.8) | 78.8 (26.0) | 77.6 (25.3) | 70.0 (21.1) | 58.1 (14.5) | 46.6 (8.1) | 37.8 (3.2) | 57.4 (14.1) |
| Mean daily minimum °F (°C) | 24.4 (−4.2) | 27.2 (−2.7) | 34.7 (1.5) | 44.2 (6.8) | 54.5 (12.5) | 63.6 (17.6) | 68.0 (20.0) | 66.3 (19.1) | 57.7 (14.3) | 44.7 (7.1) | 34.6 (1.4) | 27.6 (−2.4) | 45.6 (7.6) |
| Mean minimum °F (°C) | 3.5 (−15.8) | 7.6 (−13.6) | 16.0 (−8.9) | 25.7 (−3.5) | 37.8 (3.2) | 49.5 (9.7) | 55.4 (13.0) | 52.7 (11.5) | 38.4 (3.6) | 26.8 (−2.9) | 17.7 (−7.9) | 7.0 (−13.9) | −0.6 (−18.1) |
| Record low °F (°C) | −24 (−31) | −21 (−29) | 0 (−18) | 17 (−8) | 29 (−2) | 35 (2) | 45 (7) | 38 (3) | 29 (−2) | 15 (−9) | 2 (−17) | −16 (−27) | −24 (−31) |
| Average precipitation inches (mm) | 3.41 (87) | 3.81 (97) | 4.66 (118) | 5.59 (142) | 5.69 (145) | 3.52 (89) | 4.63 (118) | 3.77 (96) | 3.70 (94) | 3.86 (98) | 4.87 (124) | 4.15 (105) | 51.66 (1,313) |
| Average snowfall inches (cm) | 1.7 (4.3) | 2.4 (6.1) | 2.0 (5.1) | 0.0 (0.0) | 0.0 (0.0) | 0.0 (0.0) | 0.0 (0.0) | 0.0 (0.0) | 0.0 (0.0) | 0.1 (0.25) | 0.1 (0.25) | 1.4 (3.6) | 7.7 (19.6) |
| Average precipitation days (≥ 0.01 in) | 7.9 | 7.0 | 9.2 | 8.7 | 9.7 | 7.9 | 7.8 | 6.9 | 6.3 | 7.4 | 8.0 | 8.1 | 94.9 |
| Average snowy days (≥ 0.1 in) | 1.2 | 1.0 | 0.4 | 0.0 | 0.0 | 0.0 | 0.0 | 0.0 | 0.0 | 0.0 | 0.1 | 0.9 | 3.6 |
Source 1: NOAA
Source 2: National Weather Service (mean maxima/minima 1981–2010)

== Demographics ==
Historical population
| Census | Pop. | Note | %± |
|---|---|---|---|
| 1870 | 146 | | — |
| 1880 | 157 | | 7.5% |
| 1890 | 609 | | 287.9% |
| 1900 | 1,508 | | 147.6% |
| 1910 | 1,225 | | −18.8% |
| 1920 | 1,248 | | 1.9% |
| 1930 | 1,398 | | 12.0% |
| 1940 | 1,604 | | 14.7% |
| 1950 | 1,611 | | 0.4% |
| 1960 | 1,421 | | −11.8% |
| 1970 | 1,850 | | 30.2% |
| 1980 | 1,921 | | 3.8% |
| 1990 | 1,713 | | −10.8% |
| 2000 | 1,932 | | 12.8% |
| 2010 | 1,997 | | 3.4% |
| 2020 | 1,781 | | −10.8% |
U.S. Decennial Census

=== 2020 census ===
As of the 2020 census, Doniphan had a population of 1,781. The median age was 44.4 years. 23.1% of residents were under the age of 18 and 26.3% were 65 years of age or older. For every 100 females, there were 75.0 males, and for every 100 females age 18 and over there were 72.3 males age 18 and over.

0.0% of residents lived in urban areas, while 100.0% lived in rural areas.

There were 759 households, of which 25.7% had children under the age of 18 living in them. Of all households, 29.5% were married-couple households, 19.1% were households with a male householder and no spouse or partner present, and 44.7% were households with a female householder and no spouse or partner present. 42.2% of all households were made up of individuals, and 24.9% had someone living alone who was 65 years of age or older.

There were 929 housing units, of which 18.3% were vacant. The homeowner vacancy rate was 6.7% and the rental vacancy rate was 15.7%.

Racial composition as of the 2020 census
| Race | Number | Percent |
|---|---|---|
| White | 1,642 | 92.2% |
| Black or African American | 13 | 0.7% |
| American Indian and Alaska Native | 8 | 0.4% |
| Asian | 9 | 0.5% |
| Native Hawaiian and Other Pacific Islander | 0 | 0.0% |
| Some other race | 6 | 0.3% |
| Two or more races | 103 | 5.8% |
| Hispanic or Latino (of any race) | 29 | 1.6% |

=== 2010 census ===
As of the census of 2010, there were 1,997 people, 852 households, and 485 families living in the city. The population density was 1,447.1 inhabitants per square mile (558.7/km^{2}). There were 966 housing units at an average density of 700.0 per square mile (270.3/km^{2}). The racial makeup of the city was 96.64% White, 0.15% Black or African American, 0.55% Native American, 0.80% Asian, 0.80% from other races, and 1.05% from two or more races. Hispanic or Latino of any race were 1.70% of the population.

There were 852 households, of which 29.8% had children under the age of 18 living with them, 35.9% were married couples living together, 15.1% had a female householder with no husband present, 5.9% had a male householder with no wife present, and 43.1% were non-families. 38.7% of all households were made up of individuals, and 22.6% had someone living alone who was 65 years of age or older. The average household size was 2.27 and the average family size was 2.97.

The median age in the city was 39.4 years. 24.5% of residents were under the age of 18; 8.9% were between the ages of 18 and 24; 23.2% were from 25 to 44; 20.9% were from 45 to 64; and 22.7% were 65 years of age or older. The gender makeup of the city was 45.2% male and 54.8% female.

=== 2000 census ===
As of the census of 2000, there were 1,932 people, 844 households, and 480 families living in the city. The population density was 1,412.5 inhabitants per square mile (545.4/km^{2}). There were 951 housing units at an average density of 695.3 per square mile (268.5/km^{2}). The racial makeup of the city was 98.60% White, 0.36% Native American, 0.47% Asian, 0.05% Pacific Islander, 0.10% from other races, and 0.41% from two or more races. Hispanic or Latino of any race were 0.62% of the population.

There were 844 households, out of which 25.5% had children under the age of 18 living with them, 39.6% were married couples living together, 14.3% had a female householder with no husband present, and 43.1% were non-families. 40.9% of all households were made up of individuals, and 27.0% had someone living alone who was 65 years of age or older. The average household size was 2.11 and the average family size was 2.83.

In the city, the age distribution of the population shows 21.2% under the age of 18, 7.0% from 18 to 24, 21.9% from 25 to 44, 19.3% from 45 to 64, and 30.5% who were 65 years of age or older. The median age was 45 years. For every 100 females, there were 71.1 males. For every 100 females age 18 and over, there were 68.7 males.

The median income for a household in the city was $19,696, and the median income for a family was $29,875. Males had a median income of $23,438 versus $18,981 for females. The per capita income for the city was $14,407. About 19.8% of families and 25.9% of the population were below the poverty line, including 32.3% of those under age 18 and 25.8% of those age 65 or over.

== Education ==
Doniphan R-I School District operates one elementary school, one middle school, Current River Career Center and Doniphan High School.

The town has a lending library, the Doniphan-Ripley County Library District.

== Notable people ==
- Larry Dale Lee, foreign correspondent, grew up in Doniphan.
- Billy Yates, country singer, born and raised in Doniphan.

== See also ==
- List of cities in Missouri
- List of sundown towns in the United States
