= Shade–Lohmann Bridge =

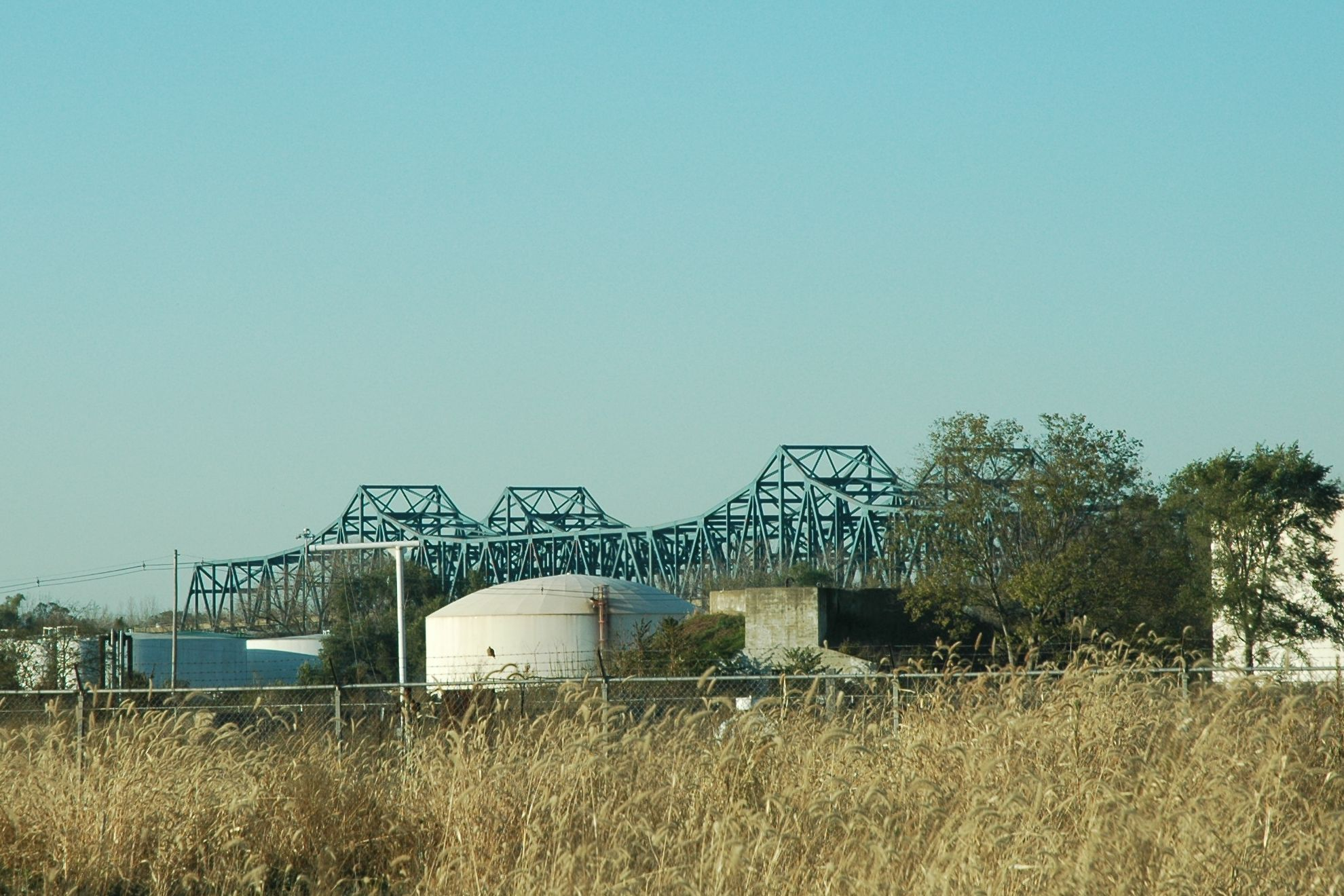
- Shade–Lohmann Bridge from the southeast
- Coordinates: 40°38′06″N 89°37′21″W
- Carries: 4 lanes (2 each WB/EB) of I-474 / US 24
- Crosses: Illinois River
- Locale: Bartonville and Creve Coeur, Illinois
- Maintained by: IDOT
- ID number: WB: 000090010928846; EB: 000090010828845

Characteristics
- Design: Twin cantilever bridges
- Total length: WB: 3,424.9 ft (1,043.9 m); EB: 3,420.9 ft (1,042.7 m)
- Width: 39.0 ft (11.9 m)
- Longest span: 541 ft (165 m)
- Load limit: 60.5 short tons (54.9 t)

History
- Construction start: 1973
- Construction end: 1975
- Opened: 1975

Statistics
- Daily traffic: 36,700 (combined)

The Shade–Lohmann Bridge is a pair of twin cantilever bridges that carry Interstate 474 (I-474) and U.S. Route 24 (US 24) over the Illinois River near the Peoria Lock and Dam located at River Mile 158.0 in Tazewell County, in the U.S. state of Illinois. It connects Bartonville and Creve Coeur. Built in 1973, the bridge was named after Pekin's former mayor and Illinois legislator J. Norman Shade, and Martin B. Lohmann, who served in the Illinois Legislature continuously from 1923 to 1953.

On March 26, 2017, it was announced that the bridge would undergo reconstruction for steel repairs, electrical work, removing the sediment from bridge piers, and painting the bridge. The project costed $13.5 million. Work started in April 2017 and was completed in November 2018.
