= Mark Luft =

American politician

Member of the Illinois House of Representatives from the 91st district
- In office January 13, 2021 – January 11, 2023
- Preceded by: Michael D. Unes
- Succeeded by: Sharon Chung (redistricted)

Mayor of Pekin, Illinois
- In office April 2019 – January 2023
- Preceded by: John McCabe
- Succeeded by: Mary Burress

Personal details
- Party: Republican
- Spouse: Lelonie
- Children: Five

Military service
- Allegiance: United States
- Branch/service: United States Army
- Years of service: 1987–1994
- Unit: Army Reserve

Mark A. Luft is an American politician who served as the mayor of Pekin, Illinois and as a Republican member of the Illinois House of Representatives from the 91st district. The 91st district, located in the Peoria metropolitan area, included all or parts of Banner, Bartonville, Bryant, Canton, Creve Coeur, Cuba, Dunfermline, East Peoria, Fairview, Farmington, Glasford, Hanna City, Kingston Mines, Lake Camelot, Lewistown, Liverpool, Mapleton, Marquette Heights, Morton, Norris, North Pekin, Norwood, Pekin, South Pekin, and St. David.

== Early life, education, and career ==
Luft was born in Pekin, Illinois. He "graduated from Pekin Community High School and attended Eastern Illinois University." He worked for the Illinois American Water Company for 26 years. He served in the United States Army Reserves from 1987 to 1994. He previously "served as President and Chairman of the Board of the Pekin JFL."

== Local politics ==
In 2015, Luft was elected to the Pekin City Council. In 2019, he successfully defeated incumbent Mayor John McCabe. In 2022, he announced he would not run for a second term as mayor and endorsed former Tazewell County Treasurer Mary Burress for the position. Luft ultimately stepped down in January 2023. In the April 2023 election, Burress defeated two members of the Pekin City Council to become the Mayor and took office in May 2023.

== State politics ==
In November 2019, Luft decided to run to succeed retiring Republican incumbent Michael D. Unes in the 91st district. Luft was originally going to face two primary candidates, Sam Goddard and Corey Campbell, before they were removed by the Illinois State Board of Elections from the ballot failing to meet the minimum number of required signatures on their nominating petitions. After winning his primary, Luft would win in the 91st district general election with a 26% vote margin. In the 2021 decennial reapportionment, Luft was drawn into the new 93rd district. On June 28, 2022, Travis Weaver, son of former Senator Chuck Weaver, defeated Luft for the Republican nomination in the newly drawn 93rd district.

While a legislator, Luft was a member of the following Illinois House committees:

- Appropriations - General Service Committee (HAPG)
- Cities & Villages Committee (HCIV)
- Economic Opportunity & Equity Committee (HECO)
- Housing Committee (SHOU)
- Property Tax Subcommittee (HREF-PRTX)
- Public Utilities Committee (HPUB)
- Revenue & Finance Committee (HREF)
- Water Subcommittee (HPUB-WATR)

== Electoral history ==
Pekin, Illinois City Council General Election, 2015
Party	Candidate	Votes	%
Nonpartisan	Michael Ritchason	1,889	19.55
Nonpartisan	John P. Abel (incumbent)	1,492	15.44
Nonpartisan	Mark A. Luft	1,481	15.33
Nonpartisan	Jason Juchems	1,091	11.29
Nonpartisan	James Schramm	842	8.71
Nonpartisan	Ron Knautz	662	6.85
Nonpartisan	Nathan Schmidgall	583	6.03
Nonpartisan	Bob Kieser	560	5.80
Nonpartisan	Robert E. Bramham	475	4.92
Nonpartisan	Steve Dennis	349	3.61
Nonpartisan	Charles T. Layne	238	2.46
Total votes		9,662	100.0

Mayor of Pekin, Illinois General Election, 2019
Party	Candidate	Votes	%
Nonpartisan	Mark A. Luft	2,000	59.88
Nonpartisan	John McCabe (incumbent)	1,340	40.12
Total votes		3,340	100.0

Illinois 91st State House District Republican Primary, 2020
Party	Candidate	Votes	%
Republican	Mark A. Luft	4,530	100.0
Total votes		4,530	100.0

Illinois 91st State House District General Election, 2020
Party	Candidate	Votes	%
Republican	Mark A. Luft	29,888	63.20
Democratic	Josh Grys	17,403	36.80
Total votes		47,291	100.0

Illinois 93rd State House District Republican Primary, 2022
Party	Candidate	Votes	%
Republican	Travis Weaver	7,484	63.71
Republican	Mark Luft	4,268	36.29
Total votes		11,752	100.00

== Personal life ==
Luft currently resides in Pekin, Illinois with his wife Lelonie. They have five children.
