= Pekin, Illinois =

- City
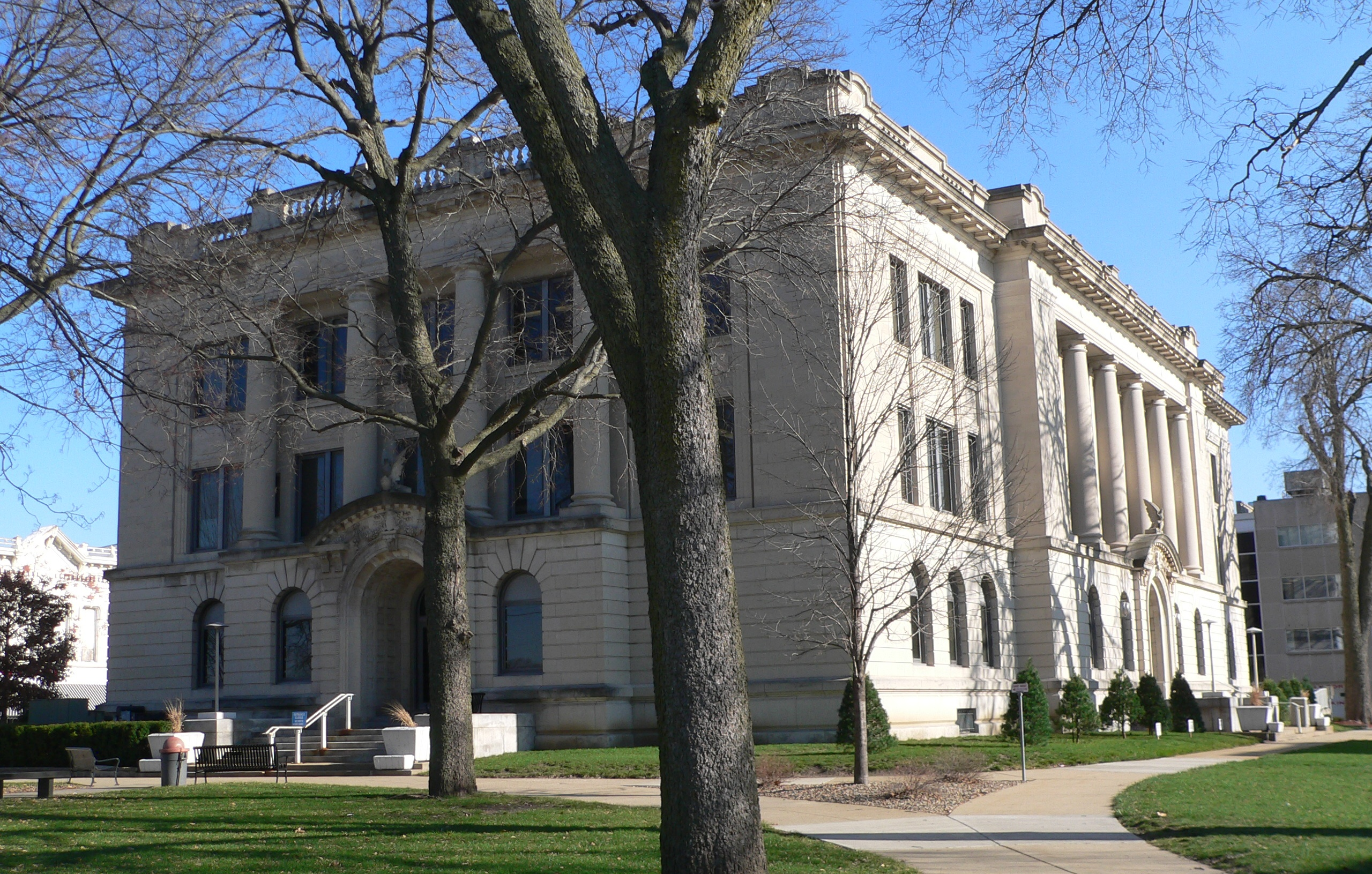
- Tazewell County Courthouse

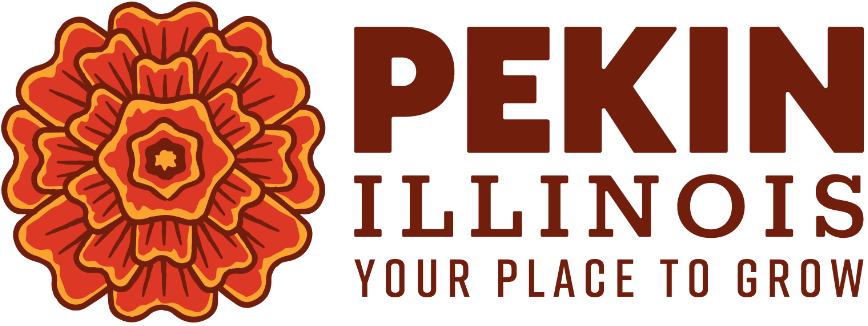
- Flag Logo
- Motto: "Your Place To Grow"
- Interactive map of Pekin, Illinois
- Location within Illinois Location within the United States
- Coordinates: 40°34′14″N 89°36′55″W
- Country: United States
- State: Illinois
- Counties: Tazewell, Peoria (small portion)
- Townships: Pekin, Groveland, Cincinnati, Elm Grove, Hollis
- Founded: 1824
- Named for: Beijing, China

Government
  - Type: Council-Manager
  - Mayor: Mary Burress

Area
  - City: 16.57 sq mi (42.91 km^{2})
  - Land: 15.72 sq mi (40.71 km^{2})
  - Water: 0.85 sq mi (2.20 km^{2})
- Elevation: 538 ft (164 m)

Population (2020)
  - City: 31,731
  - Estimate (2024): 31,266
  - Density: 13,543.5/sq mi (5,229.19/km^{2})
  - Metro: 402,391
- Time zone: UTC−6 (CST)
  - Summer (DST): UTC−5 (CDT)
- ZIP Code(s): 61554; 61555 (P.O. Boxes only)
- Area code: 309
- FIPS code: 17-58447
- GNIS feature ID: 2396172
- Website: www.ci.pekin.il.us

Pekin (/ˈpiːkɪn/ PEE-kin) is located in, and is the county seat of, Tazewell County, Illinois, United States. It is located along the Illinois River in Central Illinois. The population was 31,731 at the 2020 census. Pekin is the largest city in Tazewell County and the second-most populous city in the Peoria metropolitan area. A small portion of the city limits extend into Peoria County.

Mineral Springs Park in Pekin is located near Pekin Hospital and the Miller Senior Center. The city is home to a high-rise residential facility operated by the United Auto Workers; the Federal Correctional Institution, Pekin; and the headquarters of the regional insurance provider Pekin Insurance.

== History ==
=== Origins ===
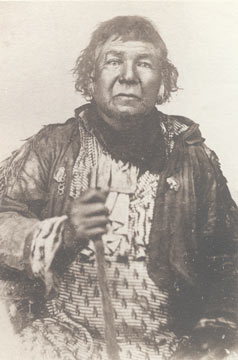
Chief Shabbona of the Potawatomi tribe, taken in 1859

Farmer Jonathan Tharp, who came from Ohio, was the first non-native American resident of what would become Pekin, building a log cabin in 1824 on a ridge above the Illinois River at a site near the present foot of Broadway Drive. Franklin School was later erected near this site. Other settlers soon joined him, including his father Jacob Tharp who arrived from Ohio in 1825. They lived near Chief Shabbona's large Indian village of about 100 wigwams, populated primarily by Potawatomi, which was situated along Gravel Ridge, on the eastern shore of what is today Pekin Lake in northwest Pekin.

The county surveyor, William Hodge, measured and laid out a "town site" in 1827. In 1829, the plat was taken to Springfield and auctioned; the town site was awarded to Major Isaac Perkins, Gideon Hawley, William Haines and Major Nathan Cromwell. Major Cromwell's wife, Mrs. Ann Eliza Cromwell, selected the name of Pekin. It has been stated that Mrs. Cromwell named the town "Pekin" because she thought Peking was on the exact opposite side of the world from the town she founded. In the 1800s, China and the United States were thought to be antipodes, or locations that were exactly opposite of each other on the globe. As such, towns were sometimes named after their supposedly antipodal locations. Another example is nearby Canton, Illinois. "Peking" was often romanized as "Pekin", as in other towns founded during the 1800s (such as Pekin, Ohio).

Nathan Cromwell named many of the city streets after the wives and daughters of early Pekin settlers. It was long held, as first expressed by W.H. Bates in the 1870 Pekin City Directory, that Cromwell was assisted by his wife Ann Eliza in the naming of the streets.

=== 19th century ===
Pekin's first post office opened on February 20, 1832.

In July 1834, Pekin suffered a cholera outbreak. Several early settlers died in the outbreak and were buried in the old Tharp cemetery. There was also a scarlet fever outbreak in winter 1843–1844.

==== Pre-Civil War ====
Pekin was the residence of Nance Costley, known to history as the first enslaved person to be freed with the help of Abraham Lincoln. She was auctioned off to Nathan Cromwell in 1827 and brought to Pekin. Her original case was part of a Probate Court hearing regarding the estate when he died in 1836. David Bailey, a local merchant of abolitionist leanings, sought the help of an attorney friend after he (and Nance) lost the case. Abraham Lincoln argued the case in 1841 at the Illinois Supreme Court, citing the Illinois Constitution and Northwest Ordinance. Justice Breese determined that Nance was a free person and reversed the Circuit Court ruling, stating that "it is a presumption of law, in the State of Illinois, that every person is free, without regard to color," and "the sale of a free person is illegal". After her freedom was legally secured, she remained in Pekin with her husband and children. In William H. Bates' 1870 Pekin City Directory, Nance was included in an entry of notable citizens:

"With the arrival of Major Cromwell ... came a slave. That slave still lives in Pekin and is now known, as she has been known for nearly half a century ... (as) 'Black Nancy.' She came here a chattel. ... But she has outlived the age of barbarism, and now, in her still vigorous old age, she sees her race disenthralled; the chains that bound them forever broken, their equality before the law everywhere recognized and her children enjoying the elective franchise."

Lincoln attended the Whig Convention that was held in Pekin on May 1, 1843. He was among several local Whig politicians who wanted to serve in the U.S. Congress. To keep from splitting the Whig vote, the competitors agreed to support each other for one term each in Congress. Lincoln ran and was elected to the 30th United States Congress in 1846, and retired at the end of the term. This single term in Congress was Lincoln's only experience in Washington before he was elected president.

Although Illinois was a "free" state, pro-slavery sentiment was predominant throughout southern and central Illinois, which had been largely settled by Southerners, some of whom were slaveholders before the state was admitted to the union. Cities with pro-slavery sentiment included Peoria and Pekin. According to the 1949 Pekin "Centenary," p. 15,

"Pekin was a pro-slave city for years. Some of the original settlers had been slave-owners themselves, and the overwhelming sentiment in Pekin was Democratic. Stephen A. Douglas, not Abraham Lincoln, was the local hero, although Lincoln was well-liked, and had some German following."

Nonetheless, there was abolitionist sentiment in Pekin. Among Pekin's abolitionist leaders was Dr. Daniel Cheever, who performed Underground Railroad activities in his office at the corner of Capitol and Court streets (in addition to his property in Delavan which was an Underground Railroad depot) and the brothers Samuel and Hugh Woodrow. (Catherine Street in Pekin is named for Samuel's wife, and Amanda Street is named for Hugh's wife). The sentiment was bolstered by the German immigrants that arrived in the area after the Revolutions of 1848; while there were small groups that supported slavery, finding them would prove difficult as the German community disapproved of the idea.

==== Civil War ====
During the Civil War, the inhabitants of Pekin were divided between the pro-slavery element, who favored the Confederacy, and the abolitionist and pro-Union element. Early in the war, the secessionist "Knights of the Golden Circle" openly supported secession and slavery in Pekin. The 1949 Pekin Centenary, p. 15, says the Knights were "aggressive and unprincipled," and "those who believed in the Union spoke often in whispers in Pekin streets and were wary and often afraid." As a response to the Knights' influence, Dr. Cheever and 10 other men gathered at 331 Court Street in Pekin on June 25, 1862, to establish the first council of the Union League of America. The goal of the League was to promote patriotism and loyalty to the Union in the Civil War and the abolition of slavery. Its members hoped to counter Northern disillusionment with President Lincoln's military policies after early Union defeats in the American Civil War. Although closely allied with the Republican Party, the League sought to enroll all Union supporters, regardless of party. The anti-slavery Germans of Pekin took an active role in the Union League in their city.

==== Immigration and railroads ====
After the Revolutions of 1848, many people from the German Confederation immigrated to the United States. During the decade of the 1850s, a 118.6% increase in the German-born population was observed. In the 1850 Tazewell County census, nearly 14% of Pekin's population was listed as originating from "Germany" (272 individuals of the 1,891 listed). In the 1860 Tazewell County census, the portion of Pekin that originated from Germany increased to 22% (774 individuals of the 3,467 listed). The 1860 census also changed the designation from "Germany" to the various states of the German Confederation- revealing that 31% of the German immigrants came from Hanover, with Darmstadt trailing behind at 22% of the population.

Several German citizens of Pekin held status in the town. Frederick P. Siebens, who came to Pekin in 1868, was stockholder and director of T. & H. Smith Company (a blacksmith, woodworking, and wagon building plant). He was also listed as a foreman blacksmith in the 1887 Pekin City Directory. John Herget moved to the United States from Hesse-Darmstadt, then returned to Germany and brought his family back with him to Pekin in 1869. He became a stockholder in Farmers National Bank and was Mayor of Pekin in 1873 and 1874. John's younger brother, George Herget, was the President of the Globe Distilling Company, the Pekin Electric Light Company, and the Pekin Steam Coopering Company. He settled in Pekin in 1853 after traveling from Gettysburg, Pennsylvania. The historic Carl Herget mansion was listed on the National Register of Historic Places. Habbe Vander Velde, one of the original founders of T. & H. Smith Company, served several terms on Pekin's city council, was Chairman of the Finance Committee, and a member of the Committee on Bridges and Licenses. He moved to Pekin in 1851. Aeilt Van Boening was the city's representative for the Anheuser-Busch Brewing Company of St. Louis. He moved to Pekin in 1867 to be with his brothers, who had settled there in 1866. Van Boening was also listed as a proprietor for City Truck Line in the 1887 Pekin City Directory.

George Herget and Habbe Vander Velde were among those on the "Roll of Honor" in the 1908 Pekin City Directory. Those who were listed were in the 1861 Pekin City Directory and lived continuously or retained citizenship in Pekin since. The list describes those listed to "represent all the varied trades and professions which were essential to the building up of our beautiful city".

In 1852, a short-lived German language newspaper Per Wachteram Illinois was published. Circa 1875, John Hoffman started a German weekly called the Pekin Freie Press. This publication was sold to Albert Weiss, then to Jacob Schmidt in 1914. During World War I, this newspaper was changed to English language and renamed it Free Press; it was published until 1934.

The northern part of town was known as "Bean Town". Before World War I, German was a second language in Pekin, some stores had signs indicating "German Spoken Here", and some churches offered German services. Sacred Heart Roman Catholic Church conducted some services in German for the older members in this section of town.

The St. Louis, Peoria and Northern Railway (St. L. P. & N.) built a line into Pekin in 1898, constructing the Pekin Depot.

=== 20th century ===
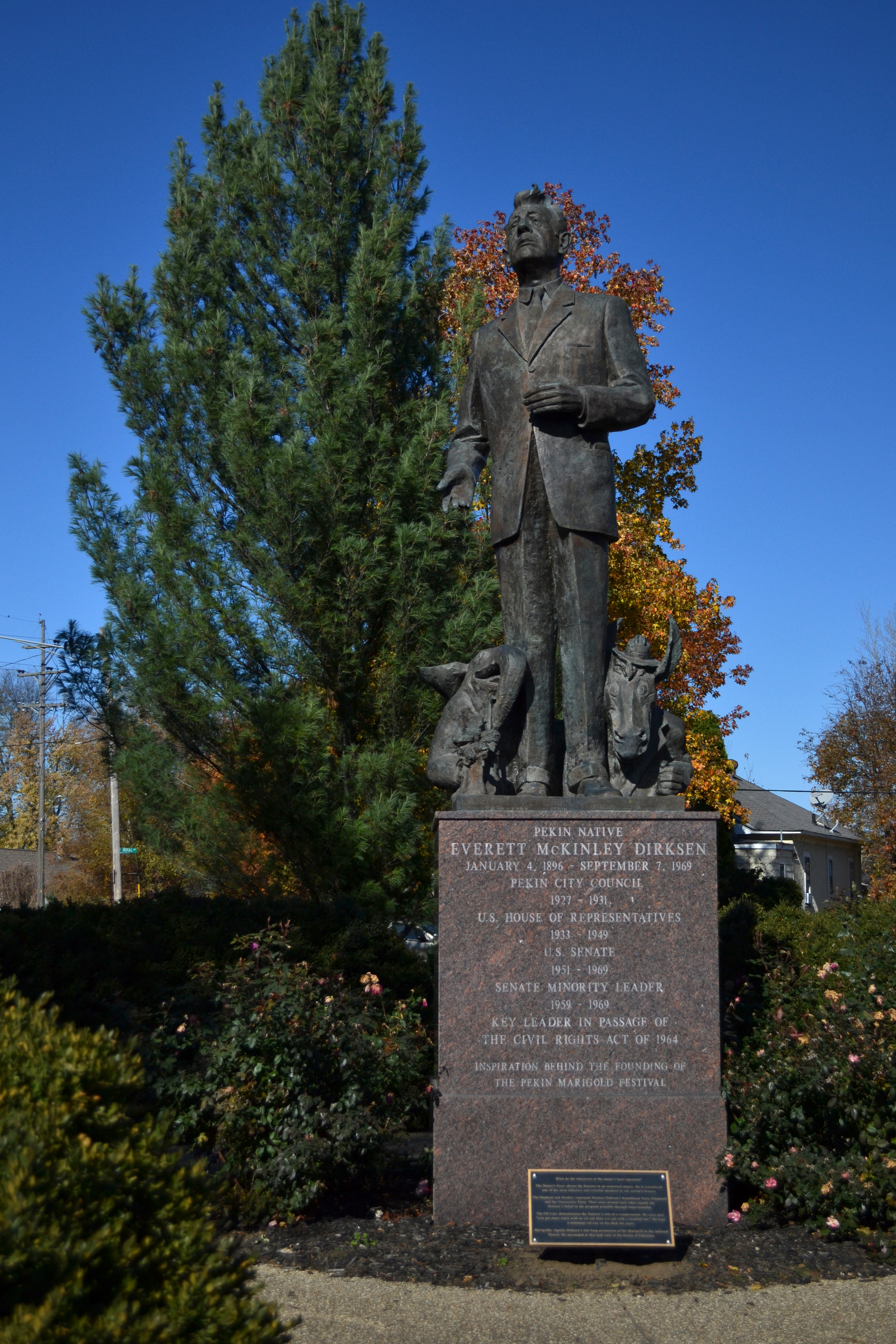
Statue of Senator Everett Dirksen in Mineral Springs Park

The Pekin Federal Building was built in 1906 to house government offices, including the post office on the first floor. The post office moved in 1966.

In an early 20th-century revival, the Ku Klux Klan recruited new members as a fraternal organization, opposing new immigrants from southern and eastern Europe, and becoming influential in rapidly industrializing urban areas in the Midwest and West, as well as in the South. It had numerous members in Pekin and other Illinois cities. In August 1924, the Pekin Klan hosted one of the largest "monster rallies" ever held in Illinois, with an estimated attendance of 25,000 to 45,000. It was during this period that leading Klansmen took over ownership of the city newspaper, the Pekin Daily Times; they used it as an organ of Klan viewpoints. The Klan owned the paper from September 1923 to June 1925; they sold off the paper within a few years, coinciding with their decline in membership.

In February 1936, Pekin held a city-wide strike, only the fourth strike of its kind in United States history.

The city had an identity and reputation as a sundown town; it was known to be hostile to black residents and few settled there. On the other hand, some Pekin church pastors participated in the civil rights marches of the 1960s, and U.S. Senator Everett Dirksen from Pekin was integral to achieving passage of the Civil Rights Act of 1964. The Effingham Daily News published an article on Peoria attorney Joe Billy McDade on December 16, 1967, that addressed the sundown town policy, in which McDade alleged that Pekin posted a sign its border that read, "Nigger, don't let the sun set on you in Pekin." The article further states, "There must be a thousand Negroes in Peoria who could have known that is NOT true."

=== 21st century ===
In 1995, Pekin became the first city in Illinois to develop an overlay zoning ordinance to protect groundwater. In 2011, Laurie Barra became the first female mayor of Pekin.

== Geography ==
According to the 2010 census, the city has a total area of 15.14 square miles (39.2 km^{2}), of which 14.56 square miles (37.7 km^{2}) (or 96.17%) is land and 0.58 square miles (1.5 km^{2}) (or 3.83%) is water.

Pekin lies on the Illinois River, and its John T. McNaughton Bridge connects the city to a small area of land the city has annexed in Peoria County. Nearby towns include North Pekin, Marquette Heights, Creve Coeur, Groveland, Tremont, Morton, Washington, Lincoln, East Peoria, Peoria, Bartonville, Mapleton, Manito, Delavan, Dillon, Green Valley, Hopedale, and South Pekin.

=== Climate ===
Pekin, much like the rest of central Illinois, experiences a hot-summer continental climate. Summers are warm to hot and humid with occasional heat waves. Winters are cold (sometimes severely) and snowy, though there are plenty of clear days in the winter. There is no "dry" season- precipitation is evenly distributed throughout the year, though late spring may be wetter than the rest of the year. July is the warmest month, while January is the coolest.

Climate data for Pekin, Illinois, 1991–2020 normals
Month	Jan	Feb	Mar	Apr	May	Jun	Jul	Aug	Sep	Oct	Nov	Dec	Year
Mean daily maximum °F (°C)	33 (1)	38 (3)	51 (11)	63 (17)	74 (23)	83 (28)	86 (30)	84 (29)	78 (26)	65 (18)	50 (10)	38 (3)	62 (17)
Mean daily minimum °F (°C)	17 (−8)	21 (−6)	31 (−1)	42 (6)	52 (11)	62 (17)	66 (19)	64 (18)	56 (13)	44 (7)	33 (1)	23 (−5)	43 (6)
Average precipitation inches (mm)	2.1 (53)	1.9 (48)	2.7 (69)	3.9 (99)	4.7 (120)	3.7 (94)	3.5 (89)	3.3 (84)	3.5 (89)	3.2 (81)	2.7 (69)	2.2 (56)	37.4 (951)
Average relative humidity (%)	81	81	74	74	77	67.3	84	81	74	69	72	78.0	76.0
Source: National Oceanic and Atmospheric Administration

== Demographics ==
Historical population
Census	Pop.	Note	%±
1850	1,678		—
1860	3,467		106.6%
1870	5,696		64.3%
1880	5,993		5.2%
1890	6,347		5.9%
1900	8,420		32.7%
1910	9,897		17.5%
1920	12,086		22.1%
1930	16,129		33.5%
1940	19,407		20.3%
1950	21,858		12.6%
1960	28,146		28.8%
1970	31,375		11.5%
1980	33,967		8.3%
1990	32,254		−5.0%
2000	33,857		5.0%
2010	34,094		0.7%
2020	31,731		−6.9%
U.S. Decennial Census

=== Racial and ethnic composition ===
Pekin city, Illinois – Racial and ethnic composition Note: the US Census treats Hispanic/Latino as an ethnic category. This table excludes Latinos from the racial categories and assigns them to a separate category. Hispanics/Latinos may be of any race.
Race / Ethnicity (NH = Non-Hispanic)	Pop 2000	Pop 2010	Pop 2020	% 2000	% 2010	% 2020
White alone (NH)	32,088	31,817	28,640	94.78%	93.32%	90.26%
Black or African American alone (NH)	857	700	721	2.53%	2.05%	2.27%
Native American or Alaska Native alone (NH)	118	130	119	0.35%	0.38%	0.38%
Asian alone (NH)	138	213	222	0.41%	0.62%	0.70%
Pacific Islander alone (NH)	4	7	11	0.01%	0.02%	0.03%
Other race alone (NH)	2	17	60	0.01%	0.05%	0.19%
Mixed race or Multiracial (NH)	205	392	1,203	0.61%	1.15%	3.79%
Hispanic or Latino (any race)	445	818	755	1.31%	2.40%	2.38%
Total	33,857	34,094	31,731	100.00%	100.00%	100.00%

=== 2020 census ===
As of the 2020 census, Pekin had a population of 31,731. The population density was 2,019.0 inhabitants per square mile (779.5/km^{2}). The median age was 41.3 years. 21.1% of residents were under the age of 18 and 19.2% were 65 years of age or older. For every 100 females there were 97.9 males, and for every 100 females age 18 and over there were 95.9 males age 18 and over.

99.2% of residents lived in urban areas, while 0.8% lived in rural areas.

There were 13,405 households in Pekin, of which 26.2% had children under the age of 18 living in them. Of all households, 38.6% were married-couple households, 20.1% were households with a male householder and no spouse or partner present, and 32.0% were households with a female householder and no spouse or partner present. About 34.6% of all households were made up of individuals and 15.8% had someone living alone who was 65 years of age or older. The census counted 8,721 families in the city.

There were 14,849 housing units, of which 9.7% were vacant. The homeowner vacancy rate was 3.0% and the rental vacancy rate was 12.2%.

Racial composition as of the 2020 census
Race	Number	Percent
White	28,979	91.3%
Black or African American	726	2.3%
American Indian and Alaska Native	129	0.4%
Asian	223	0.7%
Native Hawaiian and Other Pacific Islander	12	0.0%
Some other race	207	0.7%
Two or more races	1,455	4.6%

=== Ancestry ===
According to the 2021 American Community Survey, the biggest ancestry groups were:

- German (7,733)
- Irish (3,516)
- English (3,186)
- European (2,297)
- American (1,880)
- Italian (1,875)
- French, except Basque (1,431)

"Other groups" contained 4,105 individuals, and "Unclassified or not reported" contained 10,738 individuals.

=== Income ===
The median income for a household in the city was $50,838, and the median income for a family was $68,784. Males had a median income of $43,485 versus $30,881 for females. The per capita income for the city was $28,704. About 11.5% of families and 15% of the population were living below the poverty line, including 19.1% of those under age 18 and 6.4% of those age 65 or over.

== Economy ==
All of the coal that exists in the area formed about 300 million years ago; dead plant matter was buried, compressed, and subjected to heat and pressure during this time to create rocks full of coal. Since coal was cheaper than wood fuel and produced more energy, it became very popular and profitable to mine. In Pekin, there were at least four coal mines that existed: the Pekin Coal Mine, Regal Coal Mine, Tazewell Coal Mine, and Ubben Coal Mine.

The Ubben Coal Mine began in 1900 and was run by the Ubben Coal Company until 1903, when Tazewell Coal Company took over production until the mine permanently closed in 1925. Over the course of 25 years, the mine produced 2,089,332 tons of coal. This mine was located south of Pekin Community High School's eastern campus at S6 T24 R4W. Ubben also managed a second mine from 1911 to 1938 that was originally started by Louis Grant in 1891; they produced 928,146 tons of coal during their ownership, with a total of 1,217,196 tons overall. This mine was located near Meyer's Lake (formerly Lake Arlan) at S1 T24N R5W.

The Pekin Coal Mining Company (also known as Schaefer's Mining Company) owned a mine (originally managed by David Grant) from 1939 to 1952, and produced 898,610 tons of coal during its ownership. This was a large mine, located under Broadmoor Junior High School, Willow Elementary School, and Schramm School at S36 T25N R5W. When Fred Schaefer died, the mine was inspected and discovered to be unsafe. By 1951, the coal mining business had ended for Pekin.

The Regal Coal Mine was managed by the Regal Coal Company from 1920 to 1924, until it went out of business in 1925. It produced 102,287 tons of coal during this time. It crossed Broadway Street in the eastern part of town, with the southern half of the mine existing underneath the Parkway Golf Course and Coal Miner's Park at S6 T24N R4W.

The Federal Bureau of Prisons operates the Federal Correctional Institution, Pekin.

== Arts and culture ==
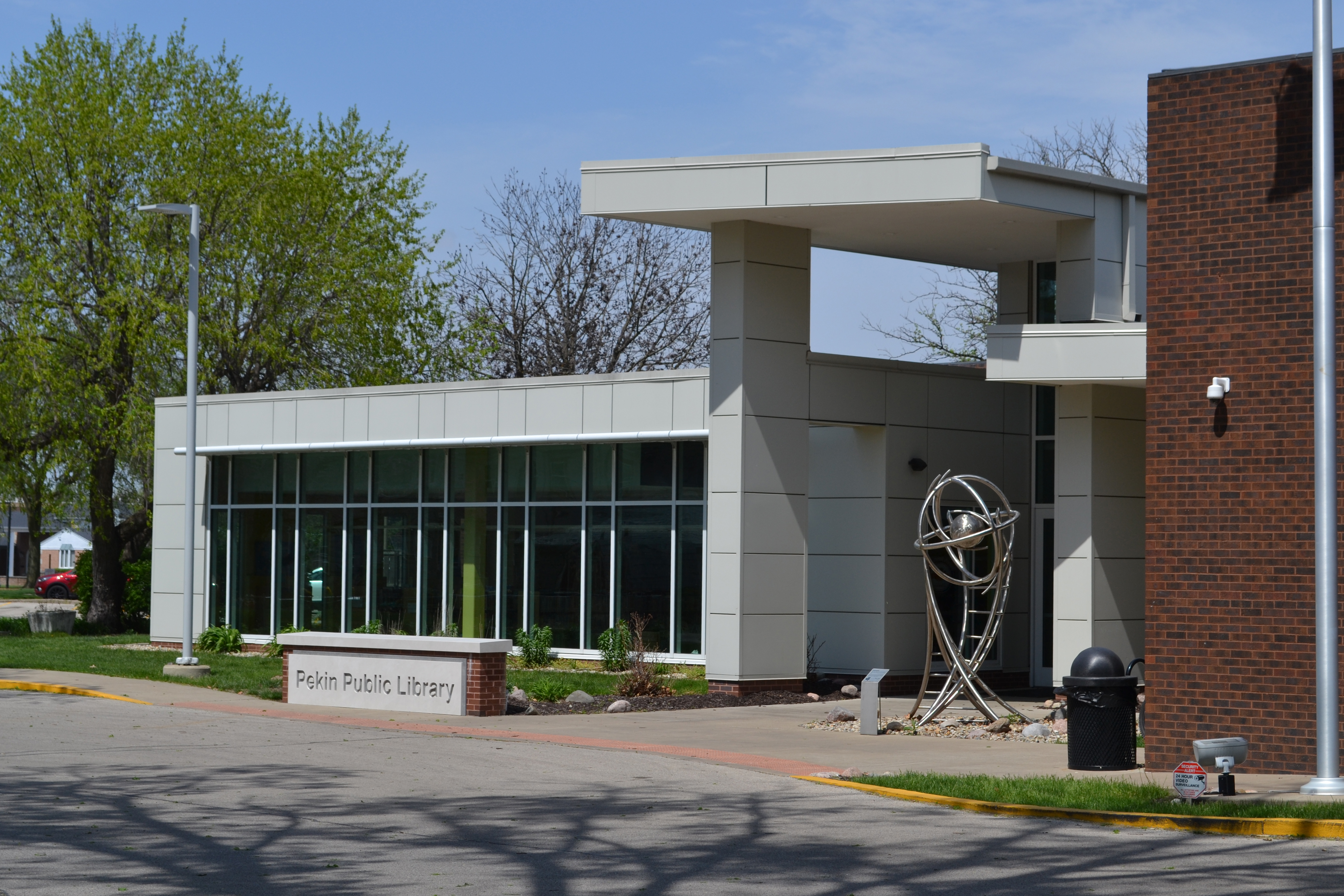
Pekin Public Library

=== Marigold Festival ===
The Marigold Festival is an annual event founded in 1973 to honor Everett Dirksen, a senator from Pekin. While in the United States Congress, Dirksen tried to have the marigold named as the national floral emblem. In support of Dirksen, the community began growing marigolds. While unsuccessful in the national flower contest, Dirksen's hometown of Pekin became known as the "Marigold Capital of the World". The Marigold Festival occurs on the first weekend after Labor Day in September. Activities include the Marigold Parade, the crowning of Miss Marigold, live music, and an arts and crafts fair.

=== Library ===
In the beginning, Pekin's library was organized by the Ladies Library Association. The purpose of this library was "not only to collect and establish a library of select and useful works, but also to promote a literary taste by encouraging lectures, holding discussions, etc." Both the membership and collection outgrew their space, and it relocated twice; to the city firehouse in 1889 and the Steinmetz Building in 1899. Due to the increase in membership, the Association's board decided to inquire about the library becoming a free city library. In 1896, the city council agreed to make the library free and appointed a nine-member board of trustees.

In 1900, board member Mary Gaither wrote to Andrew Carnegie, a philanthropist who was funding libraries for communities all over the country. With donated land from George Herget and $15,000 from Carnegie, a new library was finally built in 1902. However, continued growth of the collection and increased usage resulted in the need to expand the library, and the Carnegie library was demolished in 1974. A larger building was constructed in September 1974 and was the original home of the Dirksen Congressional Center (which later separated from the library and built its own facility in 2002).

In 1973, President Richard Nixon traveled to Pekin at the request of Senator Dirksen's widow to dedicate the cornerstone of the new library.

In 1995, the Illinois State Library nominated Pekin Public Library for the American Library Association's Bessie Boehm Moore Award for their networking opportunities, intergenerational programs that engaged all groups of the community, and services for the elderly.

== Parks and recreation ==
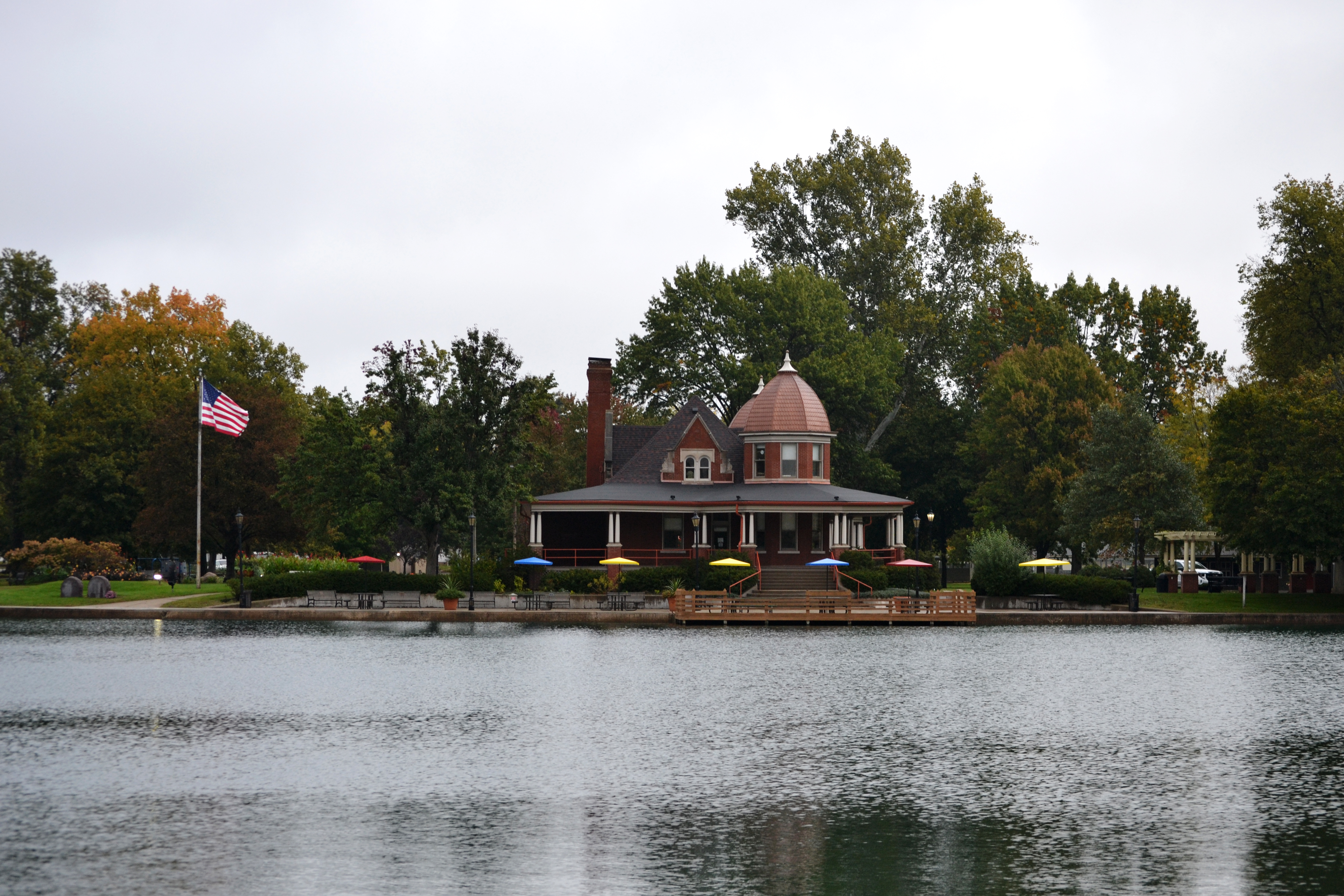
Mineral Springs Park

The Pekin Park District is the second largest in the region (Peoria is the first) with 2,277 acres (921 ha) in 13 parks. It is the fifth largest parks district in the state. It is perhaps best known for Mineral Springs Park and its iconic restored pavilion. The 220 acres (89 ha) park has a lagoon for fishing and paddle boats, sports fields, skating rink, skateboard park, Dragonland Water Park, miniature golf, and a dog park.

McNaughton Park has hiking trails, a disc golf course, and horse trails. Riverfront Park has a viewing platform along the Illinois River.

Pekin has two golf courses, Parkview and Lick Creek, as well as a country club.

There is a 4.3 mi (6.9 km) bike trail.

== Government ==
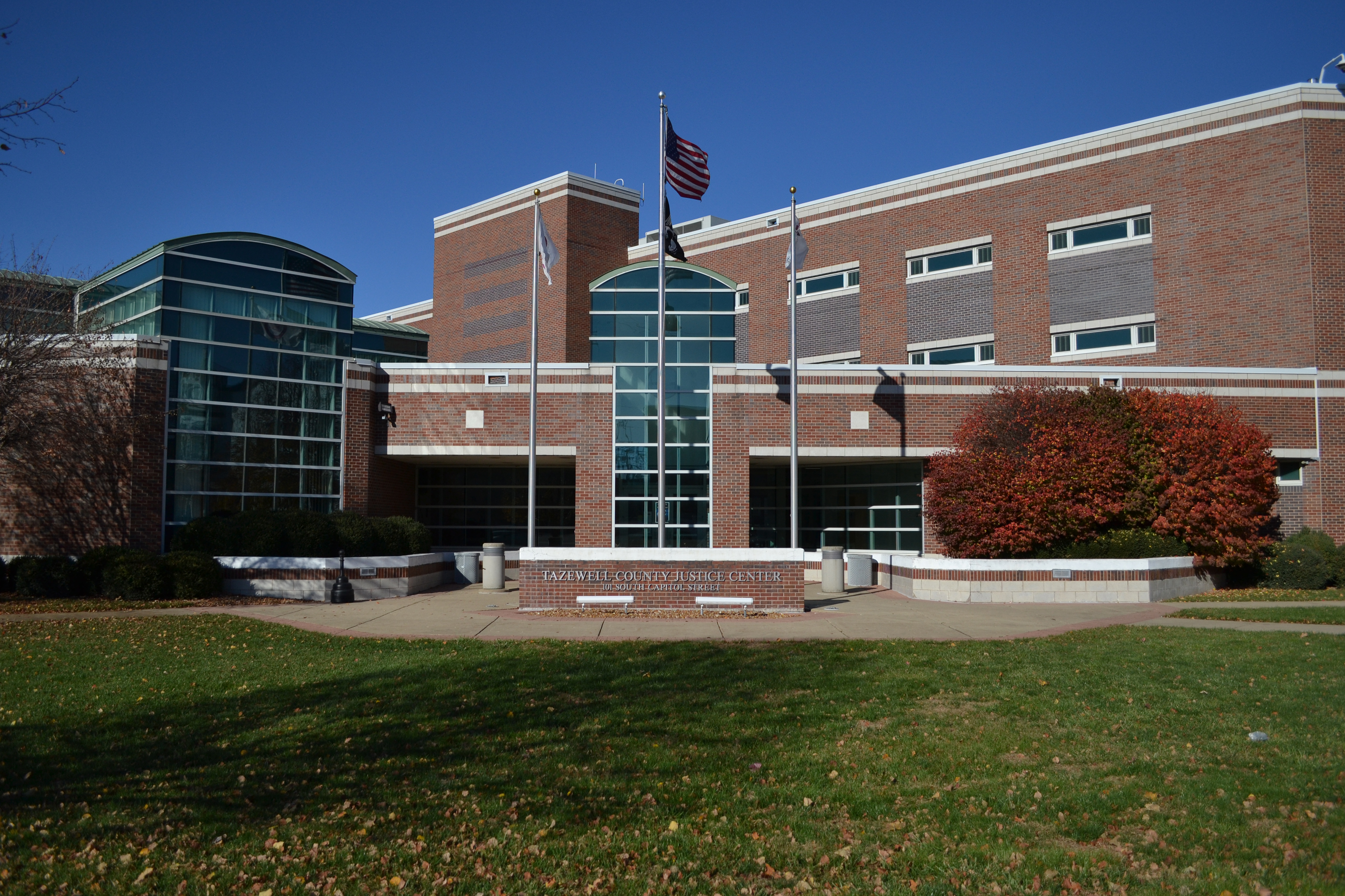
Tazewell County Justice Center

Pekin is the county seat of Tazewell County, Illinois. Originally under an aldermanic form of government, the city switched to the commission form in 1911 (see Pekin Sesquicentennial 1824–1974, A History, p. 162), but since 1995 has had a city manager form of government. A mayor and six council members are elected to staggered 4-year terms in April of odd-numbered years. Candidates may start circulating nomination papers (available from the County Clerk's office) in September, but must file them in mid-December.

The historic Tazewell County Courthouse houses the 10th Circuit Court.

The Pekin Park District was established in 1902 and still operates, controlled by a 7-member Board of Commissioners elected by the public at the same elections the city council members are.

While Illinois as a whole is represented in the Senate by Richard Durbin (D) and Tammy Duckworth (D), the state is split into 17 Congressional Districts for the House of Representatives. Pekin is split between Congressional Districts 16 and 17- the majority of Pekin is in District 16 and represented by Darrin LaHood (R). Extreme southwestern Pekin is in District 17 and represented by Eric Sorensen (D).

Regarding the Illinois Senate and Illinois House of Representatives, Pekin is split along County Road 1700 E into two districts for both. For the western division, Illinois Senate District 47 is represented by Neil Anderson (R) and Illinois House District 93 is represented by Travis Weaver (R). For the eastern division, Illinois Senate District 44 is represented by Sally J. Turner (R) and Illinois House District 87 is represented by William E. Hauter (R).

Mayors of Pekin, Illinois

Mayor	Years	Notes
Bernard Bailey	1849–50	Resigned at city council's request
Abram Woolston	1850–51	Won in a special election
James Harriott	1851–52	
Middleton Tackaberry	1853, 1857	
Merrill C. Young	1854–55	
Leonard H. Wilkey	1856	
Peter Weyrich	1858–59	
Isaac E. Leonard	1860–61	
Benjamin S. Prettyman	1862	
Samuel E. Barber	1863	
Thomas C. Reeves	1864	
William W. Sellers	1865–66	Resigned to accept an appointment to the state legislature
J. Cohenour	1865–66	Elected to the state legislature
Columbus J.D. Rupert	1867–68	Appointed
William T. Edds	1869	Appointed
David T. Thompson	1870–71	
John Stoltz	1872	
John Herget	1873–74	
Columbus R. Cummings	1875–76	First mayor to serve under a new two-year term length
Abial B. Sawyer	1877–78	
Herman W. Hippen	1879–80	
Thomas Cooper	1881–84, 1891–92	
John L. Smith	1885–86	
Albert R. Warren	1887–88	
Ernest F. Unland	1889–90	
Everett W. Wilson	1893–94, 1899–1900	
Charles Duisdieker	1895–96	
Daniel Sapp	1897–98, 1905–07	
William J. Conzelman	1901–04, 1909–11	
Henry Schnellbacher	1907–09	

Commission system

Name	Term	Notes
Charles Duisdieker	1911–1915	First mayor elected under the commission system
Charles Schaefer	1915–1919	
William Schurman	1919–1923	
Benjamin F. Michael	1923–1927, 1931	
L.B. Kinsey	1927–1931	
L. Russell	1931–1935	Appointed to fill vacancy until next election
W.E. Schurman	1935–1939	
John Norman Shade	1939–1954	Resigned in April 1954
John J. McGinty	1954–1955	Appointed to fill vacancy until next election
Norman E. Wolfer	1955–1959	
John Norman Shade	1959–1966	Resigned in October 1966
William L. Waldmeier	1966–1979	Appointed in 1966 and later elected in 1967
Willard E. Birkmeier	1979–1987	
Larry Homerin	1987–1991	
Don Williams	1991–1995	

Council-manager system

David Tebben	1995–2003	First mayor elected under the council manager form of government
Lyndell Howard	2003–2005	Removed from office upon felony official misconduct conviction
Frank Mackaman	2005–2007	Appointed to fill Howard vacancy
David Tebben	2007–2008	Died in office December 12, 2008
Rusty Dunn	2008–2011	Appointed to fill Tebben vacancy
Laurie Barra	2011–2015	First female mayor in Pekin history
John McCabe	2015–2019	
Mark Luft	2019–2023	
Mary Burress	2023–present	

== Education ==
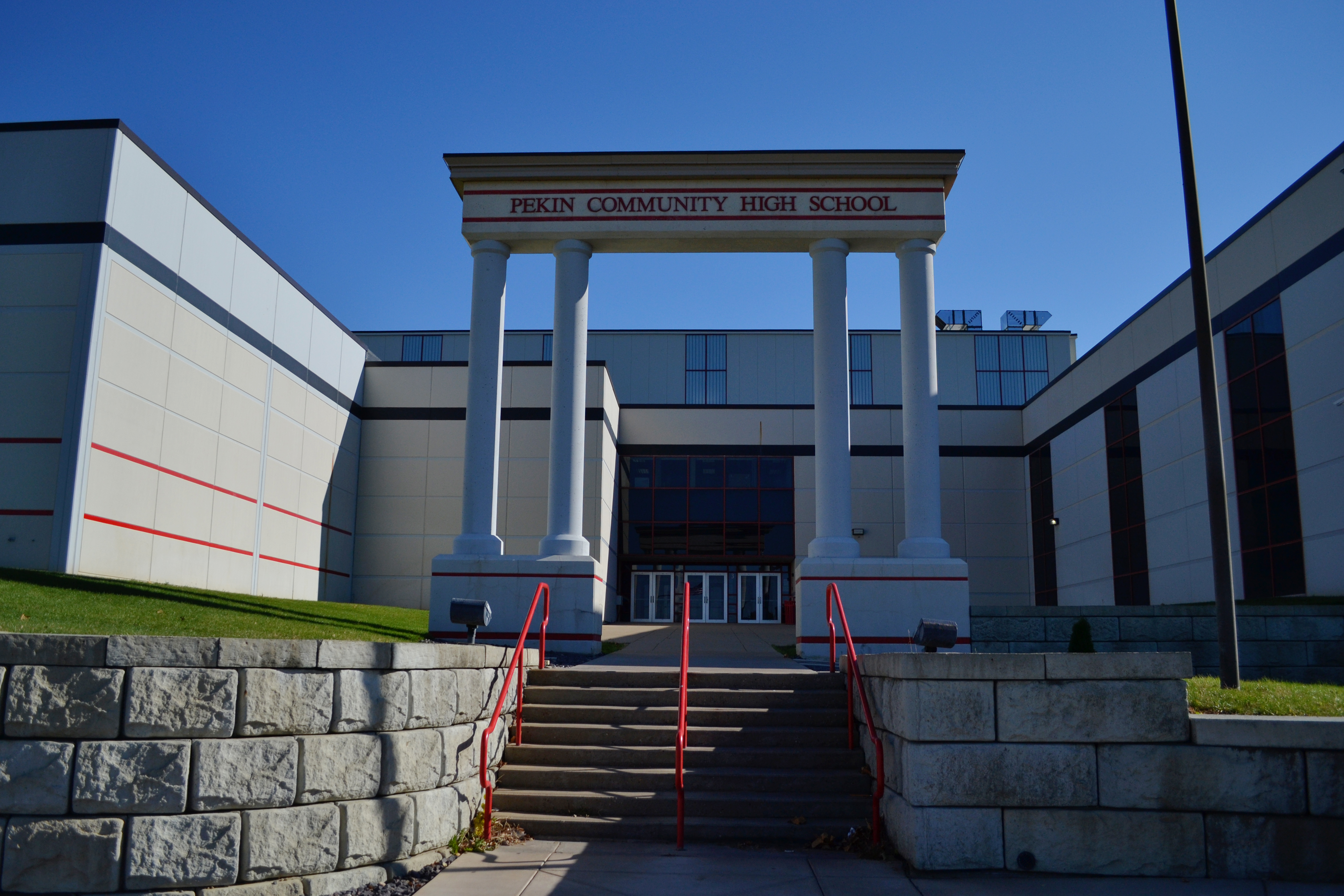
Pekin Community High School

The majority of Pekin is in Pekin Public School District 108, while other parts are in North Pekin-Marquette Heights School District 102 and Rankin Community School District 98. Portions in these districts, that is all of Pekin in Tazewell County, are zoned to Pekin Community High School District 303.

Pekin Public Schools District 108 consists of six elementary, two intermediate, two junior high schools, and the Pekin Technical Education Center. Pekin Community High School District 303 is the one high school—Pekin Community High School. District 303 serves students living in surrounding areas such as South Pekin, North Pekin, Marquette Heights, Creve Coeur, and Groveland.

The portion of Pekin in Peoria County is in the Hollis Consolidated School District 328 and the Limestone Community High School District 310.

== Media ==
The city is served by a daily newspaper, the Pekin Daily Times. In 1873, Joseph B. Irwin and Col. W.T. Dowdall founded the Pekin Times. They had a large task before them to revitalize the newspaper:

"When the first issue of the Times appeared [in 1873] there was no subscription list, as the paper had changed hands so often that its reputation was well nigh gone and the outlook was extremely discouraging. But by much hard work, natural ability and perseverance, our subject soon placed the paper on a solid basis, and as a newsy and literary production it ranked among the leading weeklies of the northwest".

The Pekin Times remained a weekly publication until January 3, 1881, when Irwin turned the paper into a five-column daily. It has remained a Monday-Saturday publication ever since.

From September 1923 to June 1925, the paper was owned by Oscar W. Friedrich, a Ku Klux Klan Grand Titan. For several years, headlines were about the Klan's meetings, policies, and plans. By the mid-1920s, the Klan's power had declined and the paper was sold to F.F. McNaughton.

== Infrastructure ==
CityLink provides bus service on Routes 17, 18 and 23 connecting Pekin to downtown Peoria and other destinations.

The Pekin Municipal Airport is a city-owned public-use facility located four nautical miles (4.6 mi; 7.4 km) south of Pekin's central business district.

== Notable people ==
- Ubbo J. Albertsen (1845–1926), Illinois state legislator and businessman
- Robert H. Allison (1893–1959), Illinois state legislator and lawyer
- Scott Altman (1959–), astronaut
- Sol Bloom (1870–1949), US Congressman (D-NY), music publisher, and entertainment impresario
- Mark Staff Brandl (1955–), artist and art historian
- Erik Brann (1950–2003), guitarist with Iron Butterfly
- Hank Bruder (1907–1970), player for the Green Bay Packers and Pittsburgh Steelers
- Liz Brunner (1959–), Miss Illinois 1979, journalist-newscaster, CEO Brunner Communications
- Donna Jean Christianson (1931–2015), Minnesota state legislator and farmer
- Wyllis Cooper (1899–1955), writer for radio
- Susan Dey (1952–), actress known for The Partridge Family, L.A. Law
- Everett McKinley Dirksen (1896–1969), congressman and senator, Senate Minority Leader
- Ethyl Eichelberger (1945–1990), noted figure in experimental theater
- Elizabeth Hawley Everett (1857–1940), suffragist, author, magazine founder/editor
- Egbert B. Groen (1915–2012), Illinois state senator and lawyer
- Head East, 1970s rock band, most notable song "Never Been Any Reason"
- William Guatney (1922–1996), criminal and accused serial killer
- Th. Emil Homerin (1955–2020), scholar of religion and mysticism
- The Jets, 1970s rock band (not the 1980s pop band)
- John Johnson (1869–1941), 19th century Major League Baseball player
- Larry Kenney (1947–), voice actor and radio host
- Seth Kinman (1815–1888), mountain man and Presidential chair maker
- Danny Lloyd (1975–), actor, known for The Shining, Doctor Sleep
- Martin B. Lohmann (1881–1980), Illinois politician and businessman
- Mark Luft, Illinois politician
- Elaine McCusker, U.S. government official
- John T. McNaughton (1921–1967), Harvard Law School professor and Vietnam War planner
- Eric Monti (1917–2009), PGA Tour golfer
- D. A. Points (1976–), PGA Tour golfer
- George Saal (1918–1996), Illinois politician and businessman
- J. Norman Shade (1902–1985), former mayor and member of the Illinois House of Representatives
- Jerald D. Slack (1936–), U.S. Air National Guard Major General, Adjutant General of Wisconsin
- Sally Smith (1945–), Alaska state legislator and Mayor of Juneau, Alaska
- Sandra Steingraber (1959–), biologist, science writer, ecologist
- Jack Stephens (1933–2011), guard and forward with the St. Louis Hawks
- James Von Boeckman (1923–2001), Illinois state representative

== See also ==
- Pekin Lettes
- List of sundown towns in the United States
