= Pekin Community High School District 303 =

Public school district in Pekin, Tazewell County, Illinois, United States

Pekin Community High School
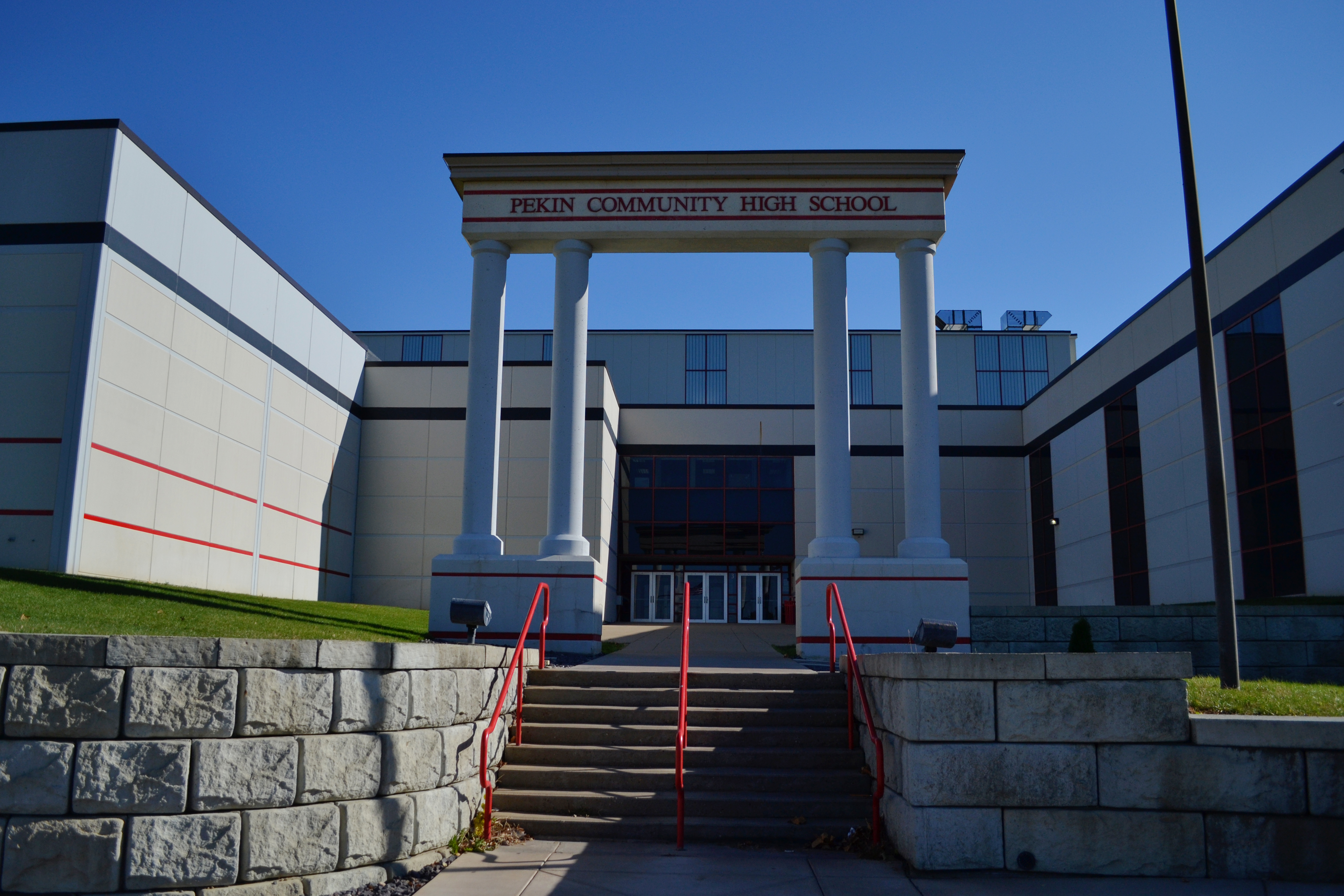
- Entrance, 2023

Location
- 1903 Court St. Pekin, Tazewell, Illinois 61554-5212; United States; 40.5627731°N 89.6222969°W

Information
- Motto: The Fire is Within
- Established: 1867
- School district: Pekin CSD 303
- NCES District ID: 1731110
- Superintendent: Maurice Ball
- NCES School ID: 173111003245
- Student to teacher ratio: 1.16
- Language: English
- Colors: Red and white
- Mascot: Dragons
- Website: www.pekinhigh.net

Pekin Community High School District 303 is a public school district in Pekin, Illinois, that operates one high school, Pekin Community High School (PCHS). District 303 serves students living in Pekin and surrounding areas such as South Pekin, North Pekin, Marquette Heights, Creve Coeur, and Groveland. As of 2025 the school has 1,737 students.

The 125-acre (51 ha) campus includes its principal campus buildings totaling 550,000 square feet (51,000 m^{2}) of space; these buildings house 133 classrooms, the 600 seat F.M. Peterson Theater, two gymnasiums, a natatorium, and several computer labs.

== History ==
The high school was built in 1915, and expanded multiple times to accommodate the growing student population. In 1959, the city planned to widen Eighth Street which ended future opportunities for continued expansion. Subsequently, the school district decided to build a second campus in 1962 and classes began in 1964. With the construction of the newer campus, PCHS was split into West Campus (original building) and East Campus (new building). Freshman and sophomores attended West Campus, while juniors and seniors attended East Campus. East Campus was expanded in 1997–1998, after which date West Campus closed and all four classes were reunited at the newer campus. After the local community lost in an attempt to save the original school building, demolition began in 2012 and was finished in 2014.

=== Mascot controversy ===
From the high school's founding until the 1981 school year, the football team was officially named the "Pekin Chinks", represented by a red dragon logo, referencing the Chinese origins of the name "Pekin". The team mascots were a male and a female student who would wear stereotypical Chinese attire, calling themselves the "Chink" and "Chinklette", and striking a gong whenever the team scored. In previous eras the community had almost no Chinese American residents.

In 1974 members of the National Organization of Chinese-Americans who took offense to the name suggested to municipal government employees that the team be renamed. The members asked the mayor and the city attorney to intervene but the response was that they were unable to. The area Chamber of Commerce argued that the community took opposition to the idea of the mascot being offensive. That year, a vote was conducted within the student body to change the name, and the vote ended in a landslide victory for "chinks" at 1,034 votes to 182. In 1975 the Peoria Journal Star stopped including the mascot name in the publication. In that year the "Chink" and "Chinklette" mascots were also retired, and between 1975 and 1979, the nickname ceased to be printed on player or marching band uniforms. Additional publications no longer included the mascot name, and the school stopped displaying statues of the mascots. However, a second vote showed similar widespread support for the name.

The school appears not to have had any Asian students in the 1960s, but by the 1979–80 school year there were nineteen students of Asian descent, including four Chinese. At the beginning of the 1980–81 school year, the school board forced a name change to "Pekin Dragons", a name that has stayed to the present. This incurred widespread protest from students and parents, including some students boycotting classes. Some graduates from the pre-Dragon era have expressed a desire for the original name to return, despite it being criticized as degrading and racist. Historian James W. Loewen noted that the name "Dragons" was also problematic, given that Pekin had been notorious for being a statewide Ku Klux Klan headquarters in the 1920s, with the Klan owning the Pekin Daily Times for several years, and with a prominent Klan leader still living in Pekin in 2005. After a TikTok video brought the former mascot to national attention in 2023, some Pekin alumni again defended the name and arranged to have "Pekin Chinks" T-shirts printed. As of 2025, such T-shirts are apparently still covertly distributed.

=== Kevin Pummill ===
In April 2019, antifascist activists identified Kevin Pummill, a PCHS social studies teacher, as a member of the white supremacist group Identity Evropa, posting on the group's Discord under the name "Undercover Academic – IL." Leaked messages from the Discord published by left-wing media collective Unicorn Riot showed Pummill posting antisemitic and homophobic messages, as well as bragging about "redpilling" students on immigration and conspiracy theories about white genocide in South Africa.

PCHS placed Pummill on leave while launching an investigation, at which time the teacher resigned. District 303 announced the resignation in a news release that left Pummitt unnamed:

While the resignation occurred early in the process of the investigation, school representatives were able to confirm that the teacher made a number of troubling and offensive posts on a private web-based message board. While the school is not aware of any instances of discriminatory conduct against students by the teacher, any concerns by parents or students should be brought to the attention of the administration.

District 303 Superintendent Danielle Owens later confirmed Pummill's identity to the press.

== Notable alumni ==
- Scott Altman, retired astronaut and Navy captain
- Mark Staff Brandl, artist, art historian and philosopher of art
- Everett Dirksen (class of 1913), politician representing Illinois in the U.S. House and Senate
- Larry Kenney, voice actor and radio personality
- Mark Luft, Illinois House of Representatives member and Pekin mayor
- D.A. Points, professional golfer
- Jerald D. Slack, retired Air National Guard major general
- Dave Snell, Bradley Braves men's basketball commentator
- Richard Stolley, founding managing editor of People and Life journalist responsible for obtaining the Zapruder film
- Rick Venturi, sports broadcaster and former football player and Northwestern head coach
