= Dave Snell =

Dave Snell is the radio play-by-play voice of Bradley Braves men's basketball in Peoria, Illinois. He has been the voice of Bradley basketball since 1979, partnering with former Bradley player Chad Kleine WMBD (AM). During the 2023–2024 season Snell broadcast his 1400th Bradley basketball game vs. Illinois State. He was previously sports director for WMBD-TV until 2001; he now is Assistant Director of Athletic Communications at Bradley University.

Snell attended Pekin Community High School in nearby Pekin, Illinois in the late 1960s, graduating in 1972 in the school's 100th graduating class. He graduated from Bradley University in 1976 with a Major of Speech and Theatre, and a Minor in Physical Education.
