= Gethsemane Church (Pekin, Illinois) =

Historic church building in Pekin, Illinois

- Gethsemane Church
- 40.571677°N 89.641354°W -->
- Address: 600 State St, Pekin, Illinois
- Country: United States
- Denomination: Christian

History
- Former name: Second Reformed Church

Architecture
- Years built: 1876

Gethsemane Church is a Christian church in Pekin, Illinois. Since 2023, the congregation has occupied the historic former Second Reformed Church building at 600 State Street. The building was constructed in 1876 for a congregation organized by German immigrants and was associated with longtime member Everett Dirksen, a Pekin native who later served as Senate Minority Leader. In 2024, a collection of old German-language and English-language Bibles was discovered in the attic of the building. The discovery received local television news coverage.

== History ==
=== Second Reformed Church ===
The Second Reformed Church was organized in 1874 by German immigrants in Pekin. The congregation initially held services in members' homes, with worship conducted in German. Its church building was constructed in 1876 at 600 State Street.

The building was altered and expanded over the following decades, although the original 1876 structure remained part of the church complex. The congregation remained at the State Street location throughout its history and closed in 2019 after 145 years.

During the 20th century, the Second Reformed Church became locally associated with Senator Everett McKinley Dirksen and his family, who were members of the congregation. The Pekin Public Library has described the congregation as becoming known locally as the "Dirksen church".

=== Gethsemane Church ===
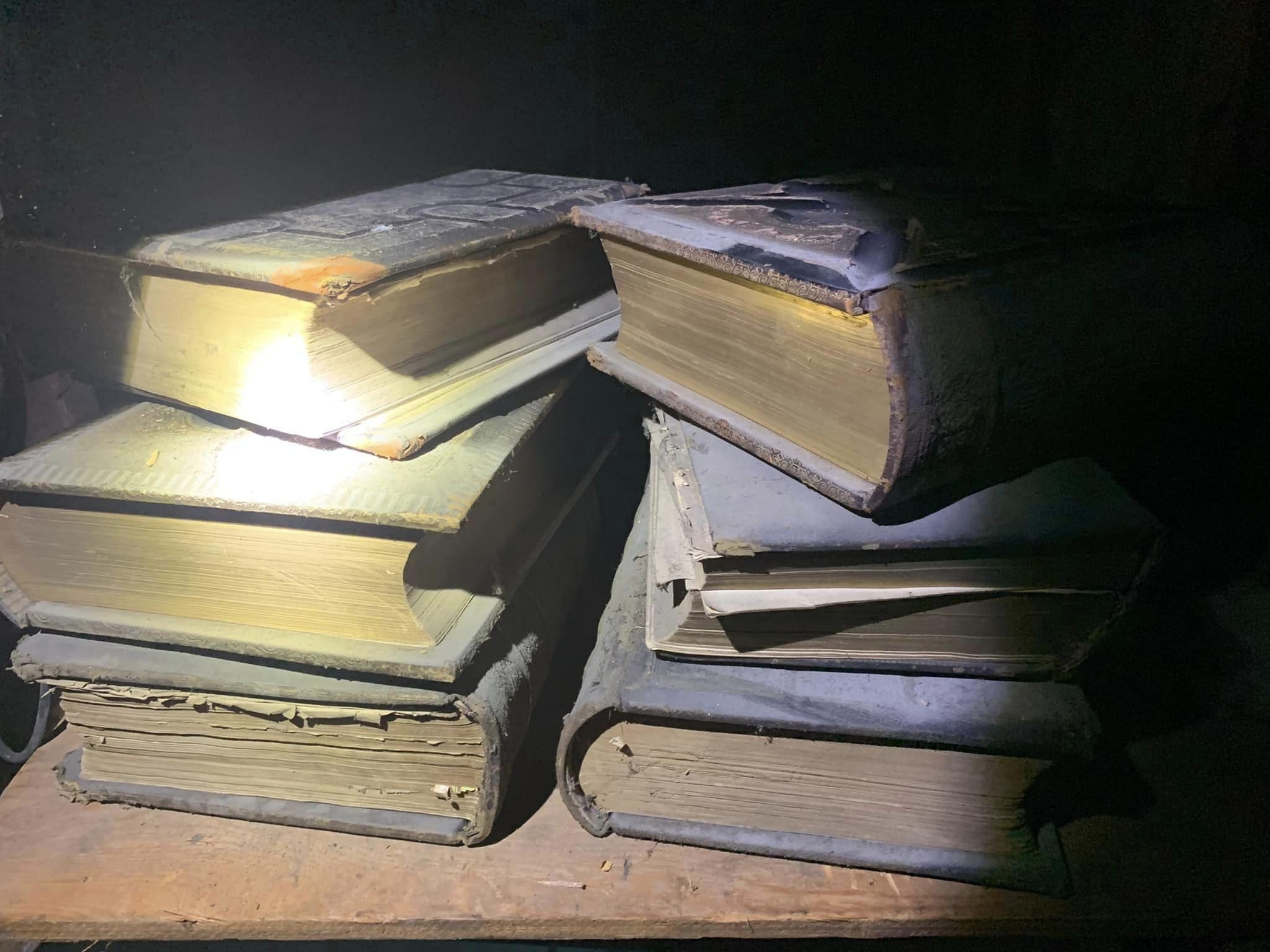
A collection of historic Bibles discovered in the attic of the former Second Reformed Church building in 2024.

Gethsemane Church later became the occupant of the former Second Reformed Church building. By October 2023, the congregation was holding services at the 600 State Street property.

In early 2024, Pastor Nathan Noyes and members of Gethsemane Church discovered a collection of old Bibles in the attic while investigating a problem with the building's air-conditioning system. According to 25News, the books included four German-language Bibles and two King James Bibles, which church representatives believed dated from the 19th century. The Bibles were found in a deteriorating container in an attic area near the church's cross. Because of their fragile condition, the books were placed on display rather than made available for handling.

== Architecture ==
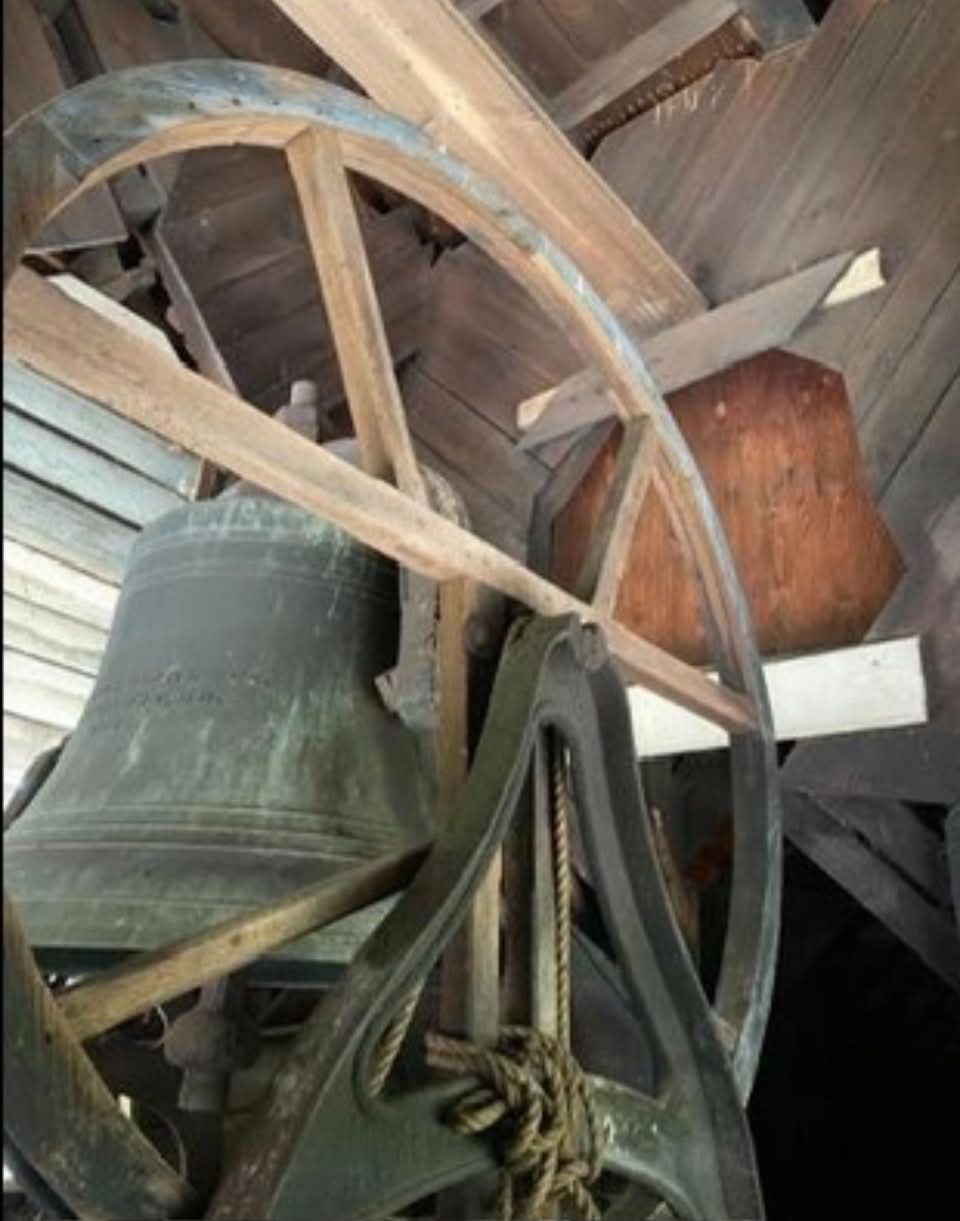
The historic bell in the bell tower of Gethsemane Church, formerly Second Reformed Church, in Pekin, Illinois.

The State Street property retains elements associated with the history of the Second Reformed Church. Historical accounts document the congregation's German immigrant origins, the construction of the church in 1876, and later alterations to the building.

The church's bell is one of the surviving features associated with the historic congregation. According to published accounts, the bell was purchased for $150 by the German congregation, shipped by boat from Germany, transported by rail, and delivered by horse and cart to the church. The bell bears a German inscription translated as "The Lord God is a sun and shield", from Psalm 84:11.
