= Senator Groen =

Senator Groen may refer to:

- Egbert B. Groen (1915–2012), Illinois State Senate
- Fenton Groen (born 1950), New Hampshire State Senate

== See also ==
- Mike Groene (born 1955), Nebraska State Senate
