= Michael D. Unes =

American politician

Member of the Illinois House of Representatives from the 91st district
- In office January 2011 – January 2021
- Preceded by: Michael K. Smith
- Succeeded by: Mark Luft

Personal details
- Born: July 2, 1974 (age 52) Peoria, Illinois
- Party: Republican
- Spouse: Natalie
- Children: 4
- Education: Bradley University (B.A.)
- Occupation: Nonprofit Management
- Website: Official state website

Michael D. "Mike" Unes (born July 2, 1974) is a former Republican member of the Illinois House of Representatives; he represented the 91st District from 2011 to 2021.

Unes was born in Peoria, Illinois on July 2, 1974. He attended Bradley University, graduating with a B.A. in Communications.

He was on the East Peoria city council, resigning in November 2010 after being elected to the Illinois House. He won his seat in the Illinois House of Representatives by defeating eight-term incumbent Michael K. Smith of Canton, Illinois.

Unes has a wife, named Natalie, and four children.

On October 24, 2019, Unes announced his decision to retire at the end of the 101st General Assembly. He was succeeded by fellow Republican Mark Luft. As of 2021, Unes is a Vice President of the UnityPoint Health — Methodist Proctor Foundation, which provides healthcare in the Greater Peoria area.
