= James Von Boeckman =

American politician (1923–2001)

Member of the Illinois House of Representatives

Personal details
- Born: January 23, 1923 Pekin, Illinois
- Died: June 23, 2001 (aged 78) Pekin, Illinois
- Party: Democratic

James Von Boeckman (January 23, 1923 – June 23, 2001) was an American politician.

Von Boeckman was born in Pekin, Illinois and went to the Pekin public schools. Von Boeckman went to University of Illinois at Chicago and Massachusetts Institute of Technology. He served in the United States Navy during World War II. He worked for the Corn Production Company, in Pekin, Illinois, as a night superintendent and was as a supervisor. Von Boeckman served on the Tazewell County Board from 1959 to 1965 and from 1999 until his death in 2001. Von Boeckman served as chairman of the county board in 1964 and was a Democrat. Von Boeckman served in the Illinois House of Representatives from 1965 to 1966 and from 1971 to 1981. Von Boeckman also served as deputy sheriff for Tazewell County. He died of sudden leukemia in Pekin, Illinois.
