= Ubbo J. Albertsen =

American politician and businessman

Ubbo Janssen Albertsen

Illinois Senate
- In office 1901–1905

Illinois House of Representatives
- In office 1899–1901

Personal details
- Born: May 23, 1845 Germany
- Died: November 25, 1926 (aged 81) Pekin, Illinois
- Party: Republican

Ubbo Janssen Albertsen (May 23, 1845 – November 25, 1926) was an American politician and businessman.

Albertsen was born in Germany. In 1856, Albertsen emigrated with his parents to the United States and settled in Pekin, Illinois. He was involved in the manufacturing business. Albertsen served in the Illinois National Guard. Albertsen served on the Pekin City Council. He also served on the Pekin Community High School Board. He was a Republican. Albertsen served in the Illinois House of Representatives from 1899 to 1901 and hen serve in the Illinois Senate from 1901 to 1905. Albertsen died at his home in Pekin, Illinois.
