= William Guatney =

American criminal and suspected serial killer

- Born: William J. Guatney; February 14, 1922; Pekin, Illinois, U.S.
- Died: March 31, 1996 (aged 74); Kansas, U.S.
- Other names: "Freight Train" "Junior" "Choo Choo"; Harold Guatney
- Convictions: Various, none for murder
- Penalty: Various

Details
- Victims: 0 convicted 3 confessed (credibility disputed); 15 suspected
- Span of crimes: 1969–1981
- Country: United States
- States: Nebraska, Kansas, Illinois, Arizona
- Date apprehended: For the final time on August 29, 1979

William J. "Freight Train" Guatney (February 14, 1922 – March 31, 1996) was an American criminal and suspected serial killer who was accused of killing 15 boys in four states from 1969 to 1981. A drifter who frequently traveled by train, Guatney confessed to three murders after his arrest, but was deemed unfit to stand trial and detained at a mental institution until his death.

== Early life ==
William J. Guatney was born on February 14, 1922, in Pekin, Illinois. His birth mother abandoned him shortly after his birth and he was soon adopted by Bert and Ruby Guatney, inheriting their surname. Guatney spent his childhood and youth in small, rural communities in Kansas such as Fredonia and Treece, where his father worked in the coal mines.

In late 1933, his adoptive father became very ill and was diagnosed with pneumonia, from complications of which he died on January 24, 1935, at only 35 years of age. The death greatly affected Guatney, who soon left Treece and moved in with his grandparents, after which he lived in the house of his brother and his wife for some time. During this period, he lost all interest in pursuing education, dropped out of school and began to live on the streets. In 1935, he started doing petty thefts and drinking alcohol.

=== Injury and later life ===
In an attempt to improve his situation, Guatney eventually left his brother's house and started to live as a vagrant, frequently changing residences and never staying in one place for long. As he lacked a formal education, he resorted to doing low-skilled labor and changed numerous occupations. From 1937 onward, owing to his alcohol addiction, he was jailed on numerous occasions for theft, public drunkenness, passing bad checks and indecent exposure.

In 1942, Guatney was drafted into the Army, and for the next two years, he fought in several locations across Europe in a tank division. Sometime in 1944, he received a severe shrapnel wound to the head, leading to an honorable discharge so he could spend time recuperating at a veterans hospital in Boise, Idaho. While being treated, Guatney began to suffer from memory lapses and showed visible signs of confusion, and in 1947, he was admitted to a psychiatric hospital for further treatment. After undergoing several psychiatric tests, he was diagnosed with paranoid schizophrenia as well as organic brain damage brought on by alcohol abuse. Due to these ailments, between 1947 and 1979, Guatney had to be hospitalized a total of 66 times in various psychiatric clinics across the nation.

Beginning in the late 1950s, Guatney severely limited his relationships with acquaintances and social contact with his relatives, most of whom knew nothing of his fate for 20 years. During this period he maintained relationships only with his brother and his wife, occasionally visiting them at their house in Neosho Falls, Kansas. Despite his mental illnesses, he was not known to exhibit any violent traits until 1979, and was described in a positive manner by most who interacted with him.

== Murders, arrest, and investigation ==
The first time Guatney came under police suspicion was in mid-1976, when he was questioned about the 1975 murders of 12-year-old Jacob Surber and 13-year-old Jon Simpson in Lincoln, Nebraska. The pair had gone missing on August 30, 1975, after attending the Nebraska State Fair – Surber's body was found nine days later south of the fair's grounds, his body bearing multiple stab wounds. Simpson's body was found in a closed hopper car on September 22. The investigation revealed that the wagon had been moved by a railroad train to Council Bluffs, Iowa, and then returned to Lincoln a few days later. The medical examiner was unable to determine what caused Simpson's death due to severe decomposition, but ruled that he had likely been stabbed to death as well, judging by chipping wounds on his bones. Guatney denied involvement, and since there was no evidence to arrest him, he was released and quickly left Nebraska.

In mid-1979, a number of high-ranking law enforcement officials gathered at a meeting in Topeka, Kansas, with the intention of forming a task force to investigate the murders of 15 boys believed to have been killed by the same perpetrator. The victims were all between the ages of 8 and 14 and were murdered between January 1972 and May 1979 in the states of Nebraska, Illinois, Kansas and Arizona. All had been found near railroad facilities during fairs, leading investigators to believe that the killer might be employed at a fair. During the investigation, it was determined that Guatney worked at the fairs as a cattle herder, and was known to easily gain the trust of children because of his ability to imitate various sounds using only his voice. Suspicions heightened after it was discovered that a letter opener seized during his 1976 interrogation was found to match the width and depth of the murder weapon used in the killing of Surber.

On August 20, 1979, Guatney was arrested by the authorities in Springfield, Illinois, and charged with the murders of Surber and Simpson. In addition to this, he was proposed as a suspect in the murder of 11-year-old Jay Durnil in Omaha, Nebraska; the murder of a girl in Hutchinson, Kansas; another murder of a boy in Rock Island, Illinois; the murders of three boys in Chandler, Arizona, and several other killings. Following his arrest, he was extradited to Topeka, Kansas, where he was charged with the murder of 12-year-old John Hanrahan Jr., who was killed on May 20, 1979, shortly after leaving a bowling club.

After pleading not guilty, Guatney was extradited to Lincoln, Nebraska, where he was charged with the murders of Surber and Simpson. He was also among the prime suspects for the murder of 9-year-old Mark Helmig in his hometown of Pekin, Illinois, as well as the murder of 14-year-old Marty Lancaster near the fairgrounds in Normal. Lancaster's decomposed body was found in the underbrush near some railroad tracks about a month after he disappeared in June 1978, having died from a severe head injury. Helmig had been strangled, and his naked, decomposing body was found inside a hopper car near the railroad station in East Peoria in August 1976, three weeks after he disappeared.

After the arraingment, Guatney pleaded not guilty to the murders, claiming that he suffered from multiple personality disorder and that his evil alter ego was the one who killed the boys. During interviews with friends and acquaintances, several of them corroborated his testimony, stating that shortly before his arrest, Guatney had told them he had mental health issues and that an alter ego was killing young boys.

== Trial ==
In January 1980, Guatney's trial for the murders of Surber and Simpson began in Lancaster County, Nebraska. During the proceedings, Guatney exhibited troubling behavior and was easily agitated, leading his attorneys to petition for a medical examination to determine whether he was sane to stand trial. This motion was granted in June, whereupon Guatney was transferred to the Lincoln Regional Center, where, in December of that year, he was found mentally competent to stand trial.

In spite of this diagnosis, however, Guatney's mental state began to rapidly deteriorate in mid-1981. Psychiatrists conducted various tests on him and determined that he suffered from delusions and, as a consequence, had trouble differentiating reality from fiction. Guatney gradually developed delusions and then hallucinations, leading his attorneys to petition for a new trial in August. This was granted yet again, and when he was examined for a second time at the Lincoln Regional Center on September 2, Guatney was found to be unfit to stand trial. As a result, all charges against him were dismissed on the grounds of insanity.

Guatney was interned at a mental facility in December 1981, but escaped from it just two weeks later. He was found wandering near some railroad tracks on December 17, and quickly returned to the facility. The staff and management were charged with dereliction of duty, after which, by court order, Guatney was once again placed in the Lincoln Regional Center.

== Treatment and death ==
After receiving the appropriate treatment, Guatney was transferred to the Good Samaritan Village Nursing Home in Alliance, Nebraska, in late 1981, before being moved to the Wadsworth Old Soldiers' Home (now the Dwight D. Eisenhower Veterans Affairs Medical Center) in Leavenworth, Kansas. In mid-1983, he managed to leave the facility undetected and resumed his previous lifestyle, but was soon arrested in Nebraska on suspicion of murder in Bellevue. Ultimately, he was ruled out, but Guatney was soon placed in a psychiatric hospital to resume treatment. He spent his last years at a mental institution in eastern Kansas, where he died on March 31, 1996. His guilt in the murders remain a subject of debate.
