= Pekin Federal Building =

- Old Post Office
- U.S. National Register of Historic Places
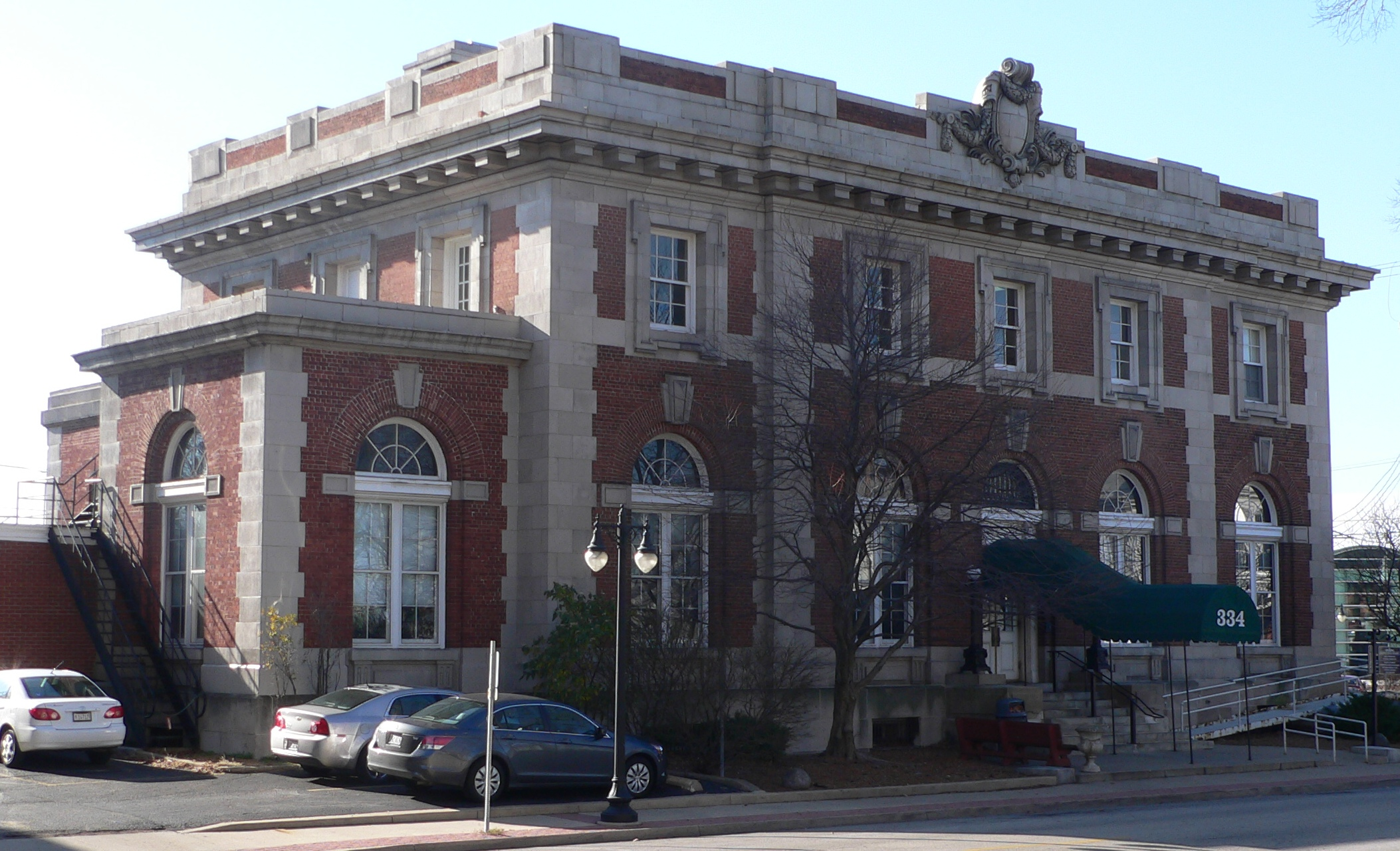
- View from east, 2011

- Location within Tazewell County, Illinois
- Location: 334 Elizabeth St. Pekin, Illinois
- Coordinates: 40°34′8″N 89°38′55″W
- Area: 0.4 acres (0.16 ha)
- Built: 1906
- Built by: V. Jobst & Sons, of Peoria
- Architect: James Knox Taylor
- Addition architect: J.A. Wetmore
- Architectural style: Renaissance Revival
- NRHP reference No.: 80001412
- Added to NRHP: October 9, 1980

The Old Post Office, also known as the former Pekin Federal Building, is a historic building in Pekin, Illinois. Built in 1906, the building held Pekin's U.S. government offices; the first floor served as the city's main post office, while the second floor held various offices, including a Department of the Treasury office and an Army recruitment office. Supervising Architect James Knox Taylor designed the building in the Renaissance Revival style, in keeping with the tradition of using classical styles for federal buildings. The building's design features a red brick exterior with a limestone base and quoins; fanlights and keystones above the first-floor windows; and a limestone cornice with a parapet wall and a cartouche above the main entrance.

The Post Office moved out in 1966 and the building was sold to private owners in 1967. The building was added to the National Register of Historic Places on October 9, 1980.

Eventually the building was bought by the Tazewell County government. County board meetings were held in the building for a time. Several county offices still operate in the building. The east side of the building's addition settled unevenly, developing a large crack between the addition and original structure in 2016; due to the historic static of the building, the county immediately asked for bids to shore up the east side.
