= Peoria Lock and Dam =

- Peoria Lock and Dam Historic District
- U.S. National Register of Historic Places
- U.S. Historic district
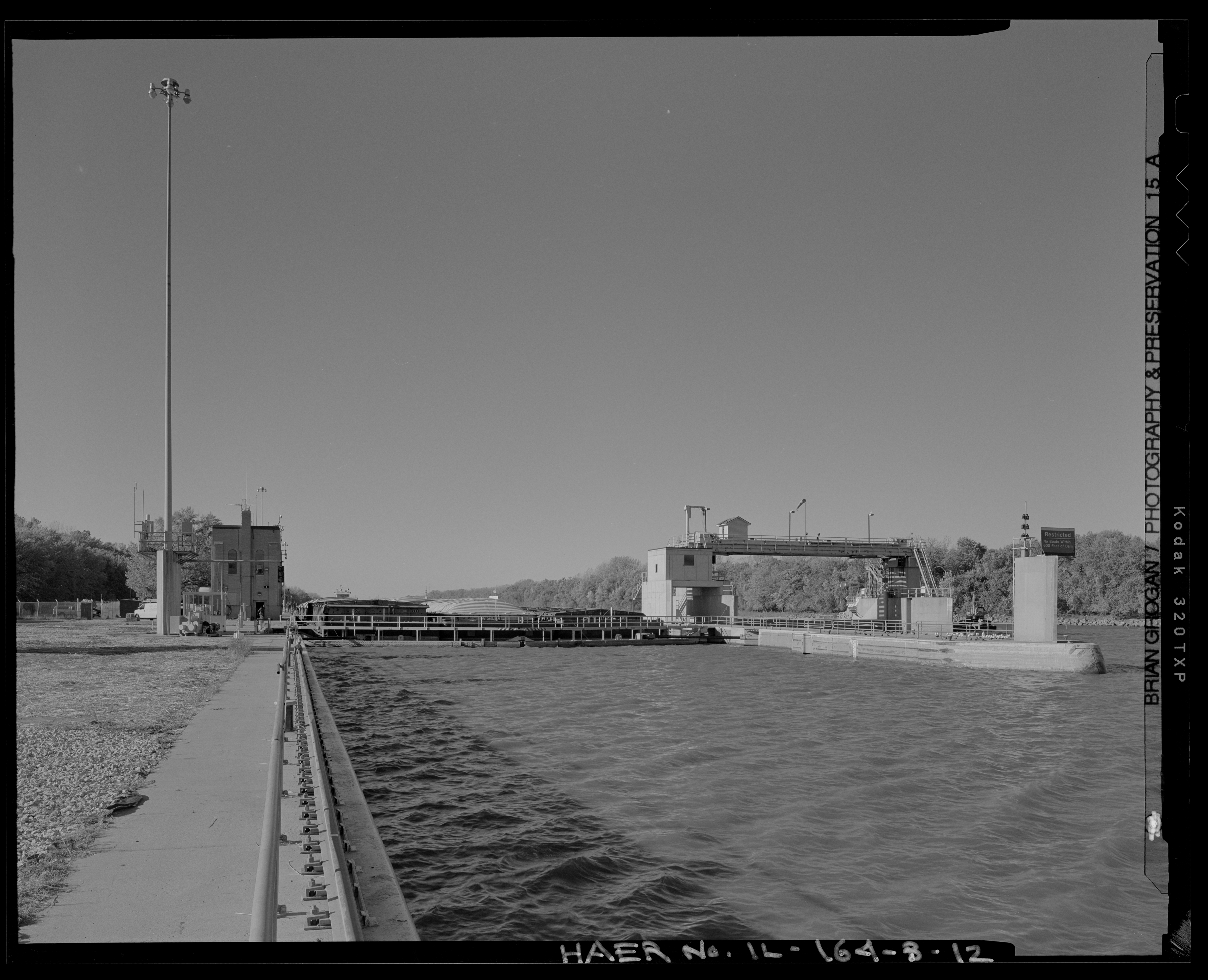
- The lock from upstream

- Location within Illinois Location within the United States
- Location: 1071 Wesley Rd., Creve Coeur, Illinois
- Coordinates: 40°37′55″N 89°37′30″W
- Area: 27.3 acres (11.0 ha)
- Built: 1938-39
- Architect: LeGromwell, Paul
- MPS: Illinois Waterway Navigation System Facilities MPS
- NRHP reference No.: 04000169
- Added to NRHP: March 10, 2004

The Peoria Lock and Dam is a historic lock and dam complex on the Illinois River at Creve Coeur, Illinois. The complex was built in 1938–39 as part of an effort to make the river navigable and establish a route for barges between Chicago and the Mississippi River. The U.S. Army Corps of Engineers designed the complex; their influence is particularly evident in the dam's control station, as the State of Illinois designed most other dam control stations along the river. The lock has a standard 100-by-600-foot (30 m × 183 m) chamber, similar to other locks on the river, and a vertical lift of 11 feet (3.4 m). The dam is 536 feet (163 m) long and includes 108 wicket gates and a Tainter gate; it is one of two Illinois dams that still use wicket gates. The control station is for the most part a large, functional building, though it has Art Deco surrounds at the main entrance. The district also contains an original maneuver boat designed to raise and lower the dam's wicket gates; the boat is still used and is one of four boats of its kind left in the United States.

The complex was added to the National Register of Historic Places on March 10, 2004.

Significant repairs were made during July through October 2020. After securing a multi-million dollar federal funding appropriation in 2022, the Peoria Lock and Dam is expected to further update its infrastructure.
