= Lou Johnson (pitcher) =

American baseball player (1869–1941)

- Pitcher
- Born: November 18, 1869; Pekin, Illinois, U.S.
- Died: January 28, 1941 (aged 71); Kansas City, Missouri, U.S.
- Batted: Unknown Threw: Left

MLB debut
- September 11, 1894, for the Philadelphia Phillies

Last MLB appearance
- September 26, 1894, for the Philadelphia Phillies

MLB statistics
- Win–loss record: 1–1
- Strikeouts: 10
- Earned run average: 6.06
- Stats at Baseball Reference

Teams
- Philadelphia Phillies (1894)

John Louis Johnson (born John Louis Mercer; November 18, 1869 – January 28, 1941) was an American left-handed pitcher who played briefly for the Philadelphia Phillies during the 1894 season. Johnson was born in Pekin, Illinois.

In his major league career, Johnson posted a 1–1 record with a 6.06 ERA in four appearances, including three starts and two complete games, giving up 22 earned runs on 44 hits and 15 walks while striking out 10 in 32 2/3 innings of work.

Johnson died in Kansas City, Missouri at the age of 71.
