= The Jets (Illinois band) =

- Origin: Pekin, Illinois
- Genres: Power pop, rock
- Years active: 1972–1980
- Label: Twin/Tone
- Past members: Mike Isenberg; Graham Walker; Greg Clemons; Greg Wilson; Randy Kohtz; Thomas H. Walker

The Jets was a band from Pekin, Illinois, consisting of Mike Isenberg, Graham Walker, Greg Clemons, Greg Wilson, and Randy Kohtz. They were together from 1972 to 1980, and a small amount of their recordings are still available on Twin/Tone Records.

After a few months together Greg Clemons and Randy Kohtz left the band and were replaced by bassist Thomas Walker who was with the band until early 1974. Gregg Clemons returned on bass. During this version of the band The Jets released the single "Be For Me" backed by "I Play For You". The song "Be For Me" from that single charted at No. 13, but the band crash-landed shortly after its release. The song "Be For Me" appears on the box set BUTTONS: From Champaign To Chicago, on the Numero label.

The band reformed in Madison, Wisconsin in 1976 with the past lineup of Mike Isenberg, Graham Walker, Thomas Walker, and Greg Wilson. This lineup went on to record on the Twin/Tone label, releasing the single "Lover Boy" backed with "Paper Girl". Both Prince and Morris Day attended the record release party for that 45 rpm record at Jay's Longhorn, a then well known Minneapolis venue. Both songs also appeared on the Twin Tone album Big Hits of the Midwest Volume III, and that double album now resides in the Minneapolis section of the Rock and Roll Hall Of Fame in the same display as Prince's Purple Rain LP and other Prince memorabilia. The band broke up in early 1980.

Graham Walker went on to join other rock groups and recording contracts, in particular achieving some fame in the 1980s power pop scene as one of the Elvis Brothers with Brad Steakley (aka Brad Elvis). Walker continues to use the name Graham Elvis.

Mike Isenberg moved to Hollywood in the mid 1990s to star in a motion picture called Brother Sam, based on Bill Kinison's book dealing with the life of Sam Kinison. Isenberg has released two CD's, Tarzan's Woods ( 2010 ), and In Rena's Room ( 2012 ). Isenberg is now the host of the popular L.A. based global radio show The DIFFERENCE, that features independent artists from around the world.
