= Martin B. Lohmann =

American businessman and politician

Illinois Senate
- In office 1932–1952

Illinois House of Representatives
- In office 1922–1932

Pekin City Council

Personal details
- Born: August 27, 1881 Groveland Township, Tazewell County, Illinois
- Died: May 29, 1980 (aged 98) Pekin, Illinois

Martin B. Lohmann (August 27, 1881 – May 29, 1980) was an American businessman and politician.

Lohmann was born in Groveland Township, Tazewell County, Illinois. Lohmann was in the insurance and real estate business. He lived in Pekin, Illinois with his wife and family. Lohmann served on the Pekin City Council and was involved with the Democratic Party. Lohmann served in the Illinois House of Representatives from 1922 to 1932 an in the Illinois Senate from 1932 to 1952. Lohmann died at the Pekin Memorial Hospital in Pekin, Illinois.
