= Tazewell County Courthouse (Illinois) =

Local government building in the United States

- U.S. National Register of Historic Places
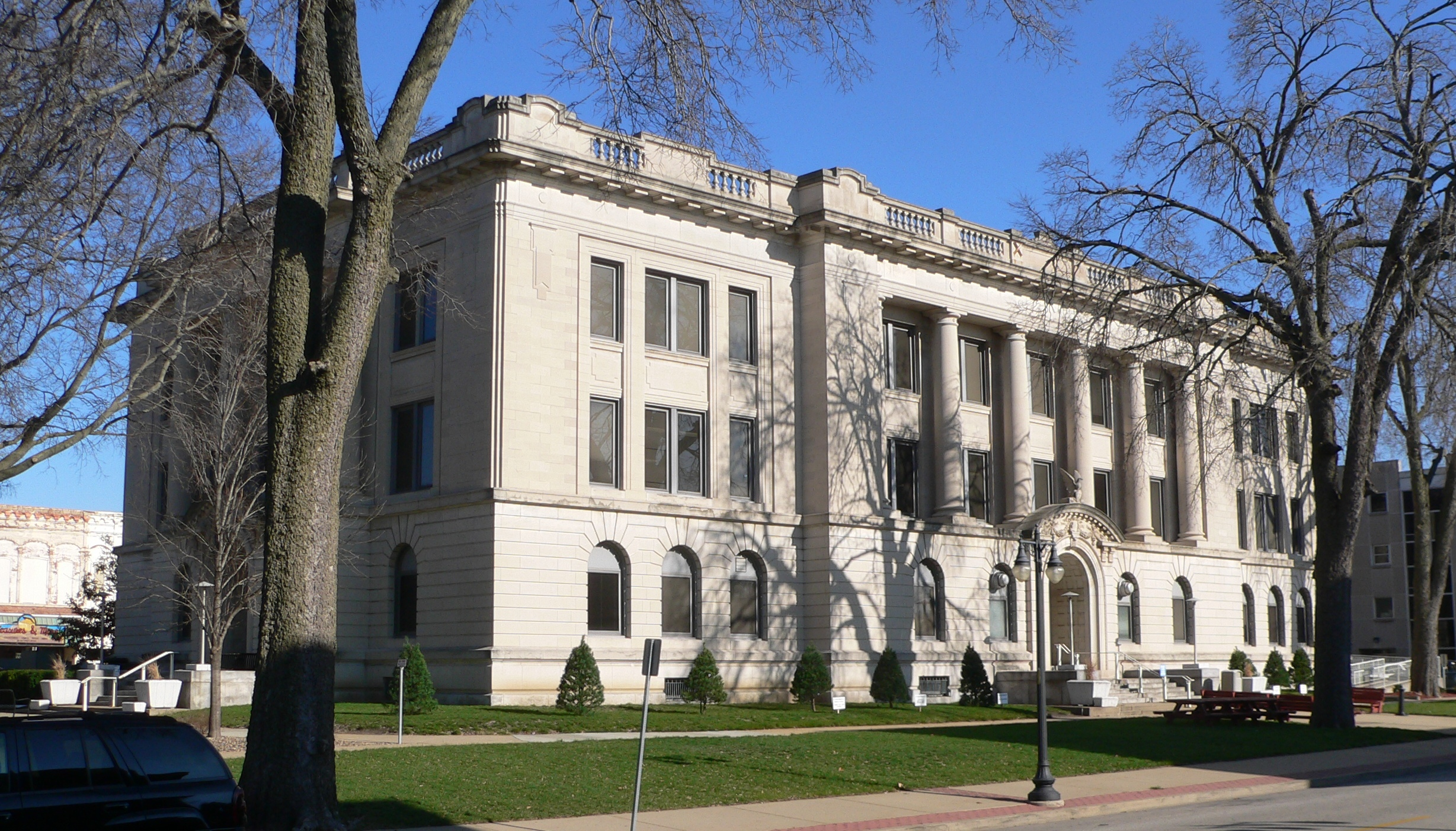

- Location within Illinois Location within the United States
- Interactive map showing the location of Tazewell County Courthouse
- Location: Court St. between Capitol and Fourth Sts., Pekin, Illinois
- Coordinates: 40°34′9″N 89°38′52″W
- Area: 1.5 acres (0.61 ha)
- Built: 1914
- Architect: Deal & Ginzel
- Architectural style: Beaux Arts
- NRHP reference No.: 85002837
- Added to NRHP: November 14, 1985

The Tazewell County Courthouse, located on Court Street in Pekin, is the county courthouse serving Tazewell County, Illinois.

== History ==
The courthouse was built in 1914 to provide a larger space for county government, which had outgrown the previous courthouse built in 1849 and had begun to spread across multiple buildings. Lincoln, Illinois architects Deal & Ginzel designed the courthouse; the pair was also responsible for two other county courthouse designs in Illinois, in Moultrie County and Logan County. The firm designed the courthouse in the Beaux-Arts style; their design features an arched entrance and windows on the first floor, pavilions with Tuscan columns on the upper two stories, and an entablature and balustrade along the roof.

The cornerstone was built with a copper box made by local sheet-metal workers, Jaeckel & Sons, to preserve many local historical souvenirs.

The Tazewell County Courthouse was dedicated on June 21, 1916. Public speeches were given by William J. Calhoun, James McMahon Graham, and J. Hamilton Lewis.

The courthouse was added to the National Register of Historic Places on November 14, 1985.
