= Jerald D. Slack =

United States Air Force general (1936–2024)

- Born: Jerald David Slack; February 14, 1936; Peoria, Illinois, U.S.
- Died: May 18, 2024 (aged 88) near Stoughton, Wisconsin, U.S.
- Military career
- Allegiance: United States
- Service: Air National Guard
- Service years: 1959–1996
- Rank: Major General
- Awards: Legion of Merit; Meritorious Service Medal; Air Force Commendation Medal; Army Commendation Medal; Air Force Achievement Medal; Air Force Outstanding Unit Award with oak leaf cluster; Air Force Organizational Excellence Award; Combat Readiness Medal; National Defense Service Medal with service star; Air Force Longevity Service Award with silver oak leaf cluster and two bronze oak leaf clusters; Armed Forces Reserve Medal with two hourglass devices; Small Arms Expert Marksmanship Ribbon with service star; Air Force Training Ribbon

Jerald David Slack (February 14, 1936 – May 18, 2024) was a major general in the United States Air National Guard and Adjutant General of Wisconsin.

== Biography ==
Slack graduated high school in Pekin, Illinois. Later he would attend Purdue University, the University of Illinois at Urbana-Champaign, and Bradley University.

Jerald D. Slack was married to Sherill Slack, with whom he had three children. His son, who served in the Air Force, died in 2012. Jerald Slack died from cancer on May 18, 2024, at the age of 88.

== Career ==
Slack originally enlisted in the Illinois Air National Guard in 1959. He would transfer to the Wisconsin Air National Guard in 1961 and was commissioned a second lieutenant. Slack would acquire more than 3,200 hours flying in a Cessna T-37 Tweet, Lockheed T-33 Shooting Star, Northrop F-89 Scorpion, Convair F-102 Delta Dagger, Cessna O-2 Skymaster, Cessna A-37 Dragonfly, Fairchild Republic A-10 Thunderbolt II, and the Boeing KC-135 Stratotanker. He was promoted to Major General of August 3, 1990 and his retirement was effective as of February 13, 1996, the day before his 60th birthday.

Awards he had received include the Legion of Merit, the Meritorious Service Medal, the Air Force Commendation Medal, the Army Commendation Medal, the Air Force Achievement Medal, the Air Force Outstanding Unit Award with oak leaf cluster, the Air Force Organizational Excellence Award, the Combat Readiness Medal, the National Defense Service Medal with service star, the Air Force Longevity Service Award with silver oak leaf cluster and two bronze oak leaf clusters, the Armed Forces Reserve Medal with two hourglass devices, the Small Arms Expert Marksmanship Ribbon with service star, and the Air Force Training Ribbon.

In 2019, he was inducted into the Wisconsin Air National Guard Hall of Fame.
