= J. Norman Shade =

American politician and businessman

John Norman Shade

Illinois House of Representatives
- In office 1954–1970

Mayor of Pekin
- In office 1939–1954

Personal details
- Born: April 6, 1902
- Died: October 26, 1985 (aged 83) Pekin, Illinois
- Party: Republican

John Norman Shade (April 6, 1902 – October 26, 1985) was an American politician and businessman.

Shade was born in Pekin, Illinois and was in the real estate business. He served as mayor of Pekin, Illinois from 1939 to 1954 and from 1959 to 1966. He was a Republican. Shade served in the Illinois House of Representatives from 1954 to 1958 and from 1966 to 1970. He also served on the Tazewell County Board. Shade died at the Pekin Convalescent Center in Pekin, Illinois.
