= Egbert B. Groen =

American politician and lawyer

Illinois Senate
- In office 1953–1973

Personal details
- Born: January 26, 1915 Pekin, Illinois, US
- Died: September 24, 2012 (aged 97) Pekin, Illinois, US

Egbert B. "Ebbie" Groen (January 26, 1915 – September 24, 2012) was an American politician and lawyer.

Born in Pekin, Illinois, Groen went to the Pekin Public Schools. He received his bachelor's degree from Knox College in 1937 and his law degree from the University of Illinois College of Law in 1940. He was admitted to the Illinois bar and practiced law in Pekin, Illinois. He served in the United States Army Air Forces as a judge advocate during World War II and was commissioned a lieutenant colonel. Groen served in the Illinois Senate from 1953 to 1973 and was a Republican. Groen died at his home in Pekin, Illinois.
