= Pekin Daily Times =

American newspaper in Pekin, Illinois, US

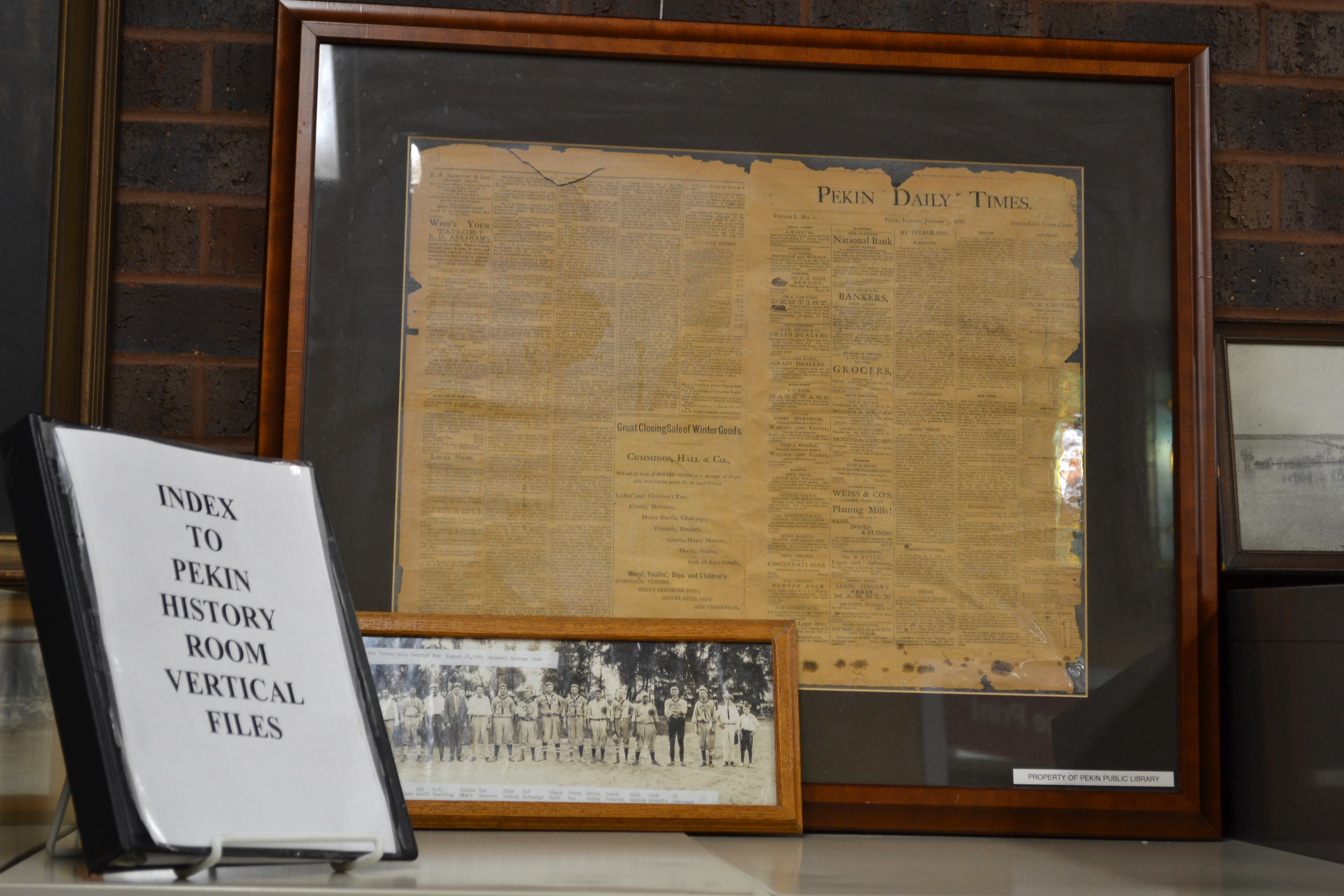
- First edition of the Pekin Daily Times, on display at Pekin Public Library
- Type: Daily newspaper
- Owner: USA Today Co.
- Publisher: David Adams
- Editor: Jeanette Brickner
- Founded: January 3, 1881
- Headquarters: 306 Court Street, Pekin, Illinois 61554, United States
- ISSN: 0745-7863
- OCLC number: 47953946
- Website: pekintimes.com

The Pekin Daily Times is an American daily newspaper published in Pekin, Illinois. It is owned by USA Today Co.

== History ==
=== Forerunners ===
Several other newspapers started in the Pekin area before the Daily Times, including the Tazewell Reporter (1839), the Pekin Weekly Visitor (1845), the Tazewell Whig (1848), Pekin Commercial Advertiser (1848), and the IIlinois Reveille (1850). In the mid-1880s, the Pekin Bulletin and the Legal Tender (a greenback newspaper) were founded. The Tazewell Mirror, which became the Tazewell County Republican in 1860, then The Pekin Post, and eventually The Pekin Post-Tribune before ceasing publication. The Pekin Daily Bulletin, the only other daily newspaper in Pekin, ran for nine months from January 3 to October 5, 1876.

In 1852, a short-lived German language newspaper Per Wachteram Illinois was published. Circa 1875, John Hoffman started a German weekly called the Pekin Freie Press. This publication was sold to Albert Weiss, then to Jacob Schmidt in 1914. During World War I, this newspaper was changed to English language and renamed it Free Press; it was published until 1934.

The Pekin Plaindealer was established in 1856, succeeded by the Tazewell Register, which changed its name to the Pekin Times circa 1880.

=== Pekin Daily Times ===
The Daily Times was founded by Joseph B. Irwin and W. T. Dowdall as a daily on January 1, 1881. It was a four-page broadsheet with five columns of text per page. A related weekly newspaper, The Pekin Weekly Times, had begun in 1873.

In 1906, the Daily Times was headquartered in a building adjacent to the Zerwekh Building on Fourth Street and Elizabeth Street. The Daily Times purchased its last Pekin-based rival, the Tribune, around the same time. The building housed a vaudeville theater, and then a dance hall.

In the early 1920s, the Daily Times was owned by Ku Klux Klan Grand Titan Oscar Walter "O.W." Friedrich, the owner of the Capitol Theater, and his business partners and fellow klansmen Silas Strickfadden and E.A. Messner. The newsroom on the second floor was reportedly used to recruit socials to the KKK. The Klan owned the paper from September 1923 to June 1925. According to a Minnesota publication, it was the first daily newspaper to be purchased by any Klan in the country, and the Pekin Klavern was one of the most active in the Midwest, inducting 500 participants on August 15, 1923. During this period, the paper published Klan activities, editorials, and a column named "Klan Komments."

F.F. McNaughton purchased the Times in 1927. McNaughton bought the Zerwekh Building when the Zerwekh brothers closed their bakery business. He installed a rotary printer in the basement. In the summer of 1971, an offset printing press was installed in the building that had been acquired circa 1906.

After McNaughton's death in 1981, the Times was sold to California-based Howard Publications. In 2000, the paper was sold to Liberty Group, later becoming GateHouse Media Inc. GateHouse was acquired by Gannett in August 2019.

In September 2007, the offset printer produced its last run and printing operations moved to the GateHouse press in the Peoria Journal Star building. The offset printer was sold for parts in 2012.

In August 2012, the newspaper's operations moved to a building on Court Street, which had previously housed Rick’s TV & Appliances. Demolition of the old Times building began in October 2013.

In 2015, Pekin Daily Times merged with TimesNewspapers. The merged team is located in the Pekin headquarters.
