= Marquette Heights, Illinois =

Marquette Heights
- City
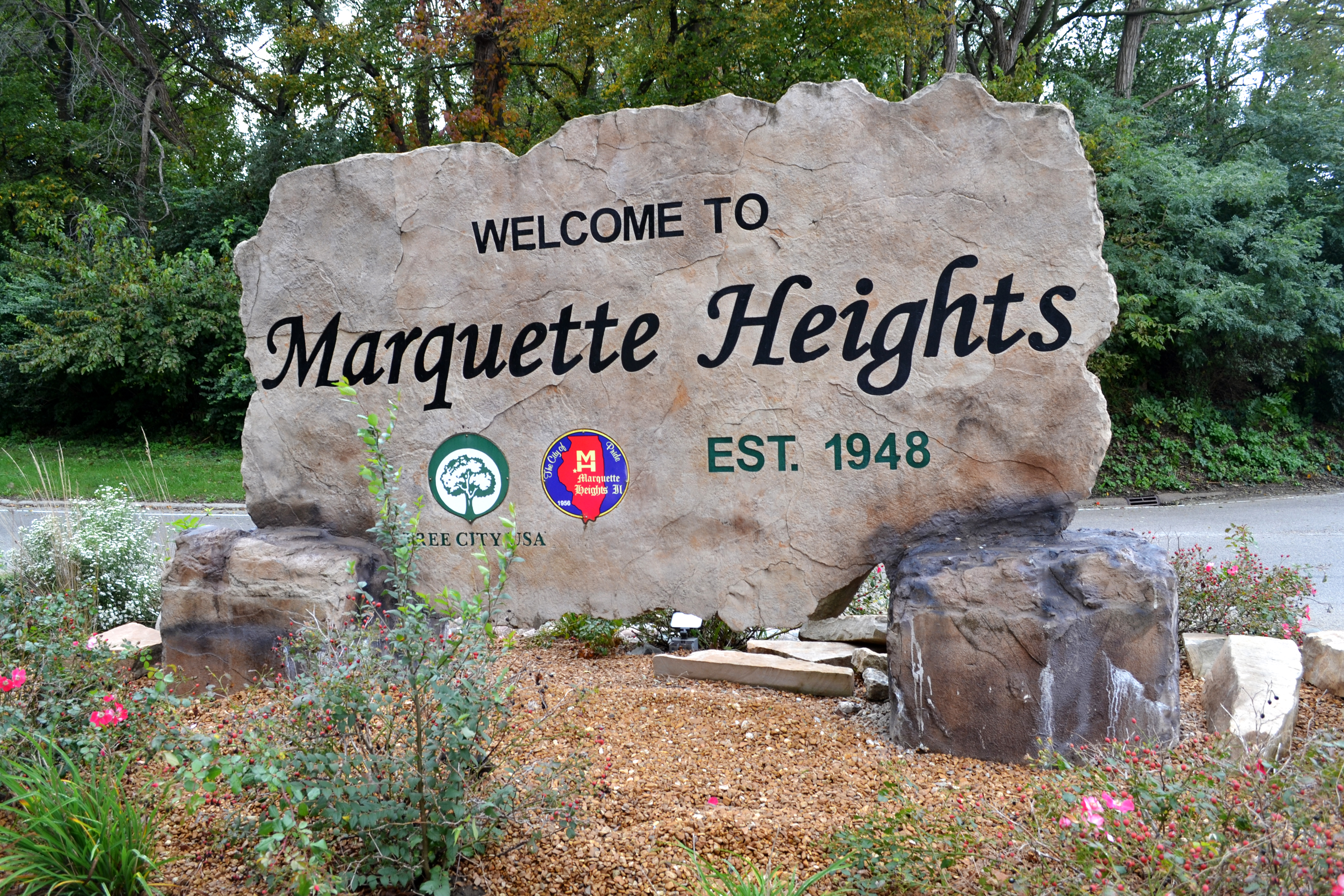

- Location of Marquette Heights in Tazewell County, Illinois.
- Coordinates: 40°37′18″N 89°36′37″W
- Country: United States
- State: Illinois
- County: Tazewell
- Founded: 1948

Government
  - Type: Aldermanic
  - Mayor: Dale Little

Area
  - Total: 0.97 sq mi (2.52 km^{2})
  - Land: 0.97 sq mi (2.52 km^{2})
  - Water: 0 sq mi (0.00 km^{2})
- Elevation: 630 ft (190 m)

Population (2020)
  - Total: 2,541
  - Estimate (2024): 2,485
  - Density: 2,608.7/sq mi (1,007.22/km^{2})
- Time zone: UTC-6 (CST)
  - Summer (DST): UTC-5 (CDT)
- ZIP code: 61554
- Area code: 309
- FIPS code: 17-47111
- GNIS feature ID: 2395019
- Website: cityofmhgov.org

Marquette Heights is a city in Tazewell County, Illinois, United States. As of the 2020 census, Marquette Heights had a population of 2,541. Marquette Heights is a suburb of Peoria and is part of the Peoria, Illinois Metropolitan Statistical Area.

== Geography ==
According to the 2010 census, Marquette Heights has a total area of 0.99 square miles (2.56 km^{2}), all land.

== Demographics ==
Historical population
Census	Pop.	Note	%±
1960	2,517		—
1970	2,758		9.6%
1980	3,386		22.8%
1990	3,077		−9.1%
2000	2,794		−9.2%
2010	2,824		1.1%
2020	2,541		−10.0%
U.S. Decennial Census

=== 2020 census ===
As of the 2020 census, Marquette Heights had a population of 2,541. The median age was 41.3 years. 22.2% of residents were under the age of 18 and 18.4% of residents were 65 years of age or older. For every 100 females there were 100.2 males, and for every 100 females age 18 and over there were 97.4 males age 18 and over.

100.0% of residents lived in urban areas, while 0.0% lived in rural areas.

There were 1,011 households in Marquette Heights, of which 31.9% had children under the age of 18 living in them. Of all households, 54.3% were married-couple households, 14.8% were households with a male householder and no spouse or partner present, and 22.4% were households with a female householder and no spouse or partner present. About 22.7% of all households were made up of individuals and 11.7% had someone living alone who was 65 years of age or older.

There were 1,068 housing units, of which 5.3% were vacant. The homeowner vacancy rate was 2.5% and the rental vacancy rate was 3.6%.

Racial composition as of the 2020 census
Race	Number	Percent
White	2,314	91.1%
Black or African American	10	0.4%
American Indian and Alaska Native	9	0.4%
Asian	12	0.5%
Native Hawaiian and Other Pacific Islander	2	0.1%
Some other race	14	0.6%
Two or more races	180	7.1%
Hispanic or Latino (of any race)	58	2.3%

=== 2000 census ===
As of the census of 2000, there were 2,794 people, 982 households, and 815 families residing in the city. The population density was 1,702.7 inhabitants per square mile (657.4/km^{2}). There were 1,006 housing units at an average density of 613.1 per square mile (236.7/km^{2}). The racial makeup of the city was 98.21% White, 0.39% African American, 0.07% Native American, 0.25% Asian, 0.39% from other races, and 0.68% from two or more races. Hispanic or Latino of any race were 1.32% of the population.

There were 982 households, out of which 38.9% had children under the age of 18 living with them, 68.1% were married couples living together, 9.8% had a female householder with no husband present, and 17.0% were non-families. 14.1% of all households were made up of individuals, and 4.4% had someone living alone who was 65 years of age or older. The average household size was 2.85 and the average family size was 3.08.

In the city, the population was spread out, with 28.5% under the age of 18, 8.2% from 18 to 24, 30.3% from 25 to 44, 25.1% from 45 to 64, and 7.9% who were 65 years of age or older. The median age was 34 years. For every 100 females, there were 101.3 males. For every 100 females age 18 and over, there were 98.7 males.

The median income for a household in the city was $47,073, and the median income for a family was $50,714. Males had a median income of $40,870 versus $23,674 for females. The per capita income for the city was $17,935. About 2.7% of families and 2.9% of the population were below the poverty line, including 0.9% of those under age 18 and none of those age 65 or over.

== Transportation ==
CityLink provides bus service on Route 23 connecting Marquette Heights to downtown Peoria, downtown Pekin and other destinations.
