= North Pekin, Illinois =

North Pekin
- Village
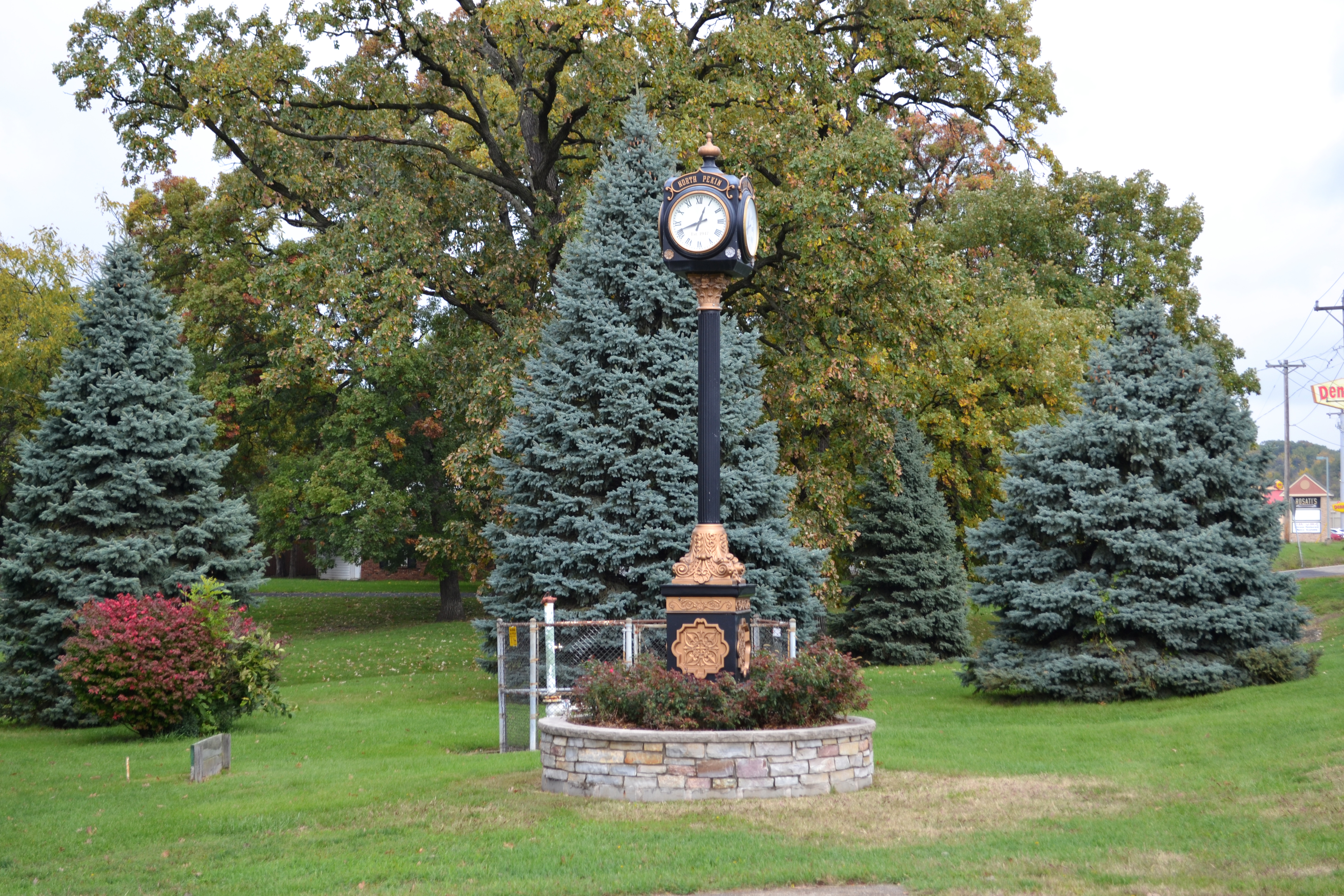
- Clock at Richard Morrissey Park

- Location of North Pekin in Tazewell County, Illinois.
- Coordinates: 40°36′40″N 89°37′28″W
- Country: United States
- State: Illinois
- County: Tazewell

Area
  - Total: 1.42 sq mi (3.69 km^{2})
  - Land: 1.37 sq mi (3.56 km^{2})
  - Water: 0.050 sq mi (0.13 km^{2})
- Elevation: 472 ft (144 m)

Population (2020)
  - Total: 1,478
  - Density: 1,075.9/sq mi (415.39/km^{2})
- Time zone: UTC-6 (CST)
  - Summer (DST): UTC-5 (CDT)
- ZIP Code(s): 61554
- Area code: 309
- FIPS code: 17-54092
- GNIS feature ID: 2399520
- Website: northpekin.us

North Pekin is a village in Tazewell County, Illinois, United States. As of the 2020 census, North Pekin had a population of 1,478. North Pekin is a suburb of Peoria and is part of the Peoria, Illinois Metropolitan Statistical Area.

== Geography ==
According to the 2010 census, North Pekin has a total area of 1.708 square miles (4.42 km^{2}), of which 1.68 square miles (4.35 km^{2}) (or 98.36%) is land and 0.028 square miles (0.07 km^{2}) (or 1.64%) is water.

== Demographics ==
Historical population
Census	Pop.	Note	%±
1950	1,758		—
1960	2,025		15.2%
1970	1,886		−6.9%
1980	1,824		−3.3%
1990	1,556		−14.7%
2000	1,574		1.2%
2010	1,573		−0.1%
2020	1,478		−6.0%
U.S. Decennial Census

=== 2020 census ===
As of the 2020 census, North Pekin had a population of 1,478. The median age was 42.9 years. 21.2% of residents were under the age of 18 and 18.1% of residents were 65 years of age or older. For every 100 females there were 99.5 males, and for every 100 females age 18 and over there were 98.0 males age 18 and over.

100.0% of residents lived in urban areas, while 0.0% lived in rural areas.

There were 632 households in North Pekin, of which 27.8% had children under the age of 18 living in them. Of all households, 44.1% were married-couple households, 19.1% were households with a male householder and no spouse or partner present, and 25.8% were households with a female householder and no spouse or partner present. About 30.7% of all households were made up of individuals and 12.8% had someone living alone who was 65 years of age or older.

There were 673 housing units, of which 6.1% were vacant. The homeowner vacancy rate was 1.9% and the rental vacancy rate was 7.6%.

Racial composition as of the 2020 census
Race	Number	Percent
White	1,374	93.0%
Black or African American	11	0.7%
American Indian and Alaska Native	6	0.4%
Asian	14	0.9%
Native Hawaiian and Other Pacific Islander	2	0.1%
Some other race	9	0.6%
Two or more races	62	4.2%
Hispanic or Latino (of any race)	29	2.0%

=== 2000 census ===
As of the census of 2000, there were 1,574 people, 602 households, and 462 families residing in the village. The population density was 1,359.9 inhabitants per square mile (525.1/km^{2}). There were 634 housing units at an average density of 547.8 per square mile (211.5/km^{2}). The racial makeup of the village was 97.78% White, 0.44% Native American, 0.64% Asian, 0.06% from other races, and 1.08% from two or more races. Hispanic or Latino of any race were 0.38% of the population.

There were 602 households, out of which 34.7% had children under the age of 18 living with them, 61.3% were married couples living together, 10.6% had a female householder with no husband present, and 23.1% were non-families. 18.9% of all households were made up of individuals, and 7.8% had someone living alone who was 65 years of age or older. The average household size was 2.61 and the average family size was 2.95.

In the village, the population was spread out, with 25.9% under the age of 18, 8.9% from 18 to 24, 29.9% from 25 to 44, 23.4% from 45 to 64, and 12.0% who were 65 years of age or older. The median age was 36 years. For every 100 females, there were 99.7 males. For every 100 females age 18 and over, there were 101.2 males.

The median income for a household in the village was $41,375, and the median income for a family was $44,013. Males had a median income of $37,734 versus $19,821 for females. The per capita income for the village was $18,072. About 8.4% of families and 8.4% of the population were below the poverty line, including 14.5% of those under age 18 and 2.6% of those age 65 or over.

== Transportation ==
CityLink provides bus service on Route 29 connecting North Pekin to downtown Peoria, downtown Pekin and other destinations.
