= Creve Coeur, Illinois =

Creve Coeur
- Village
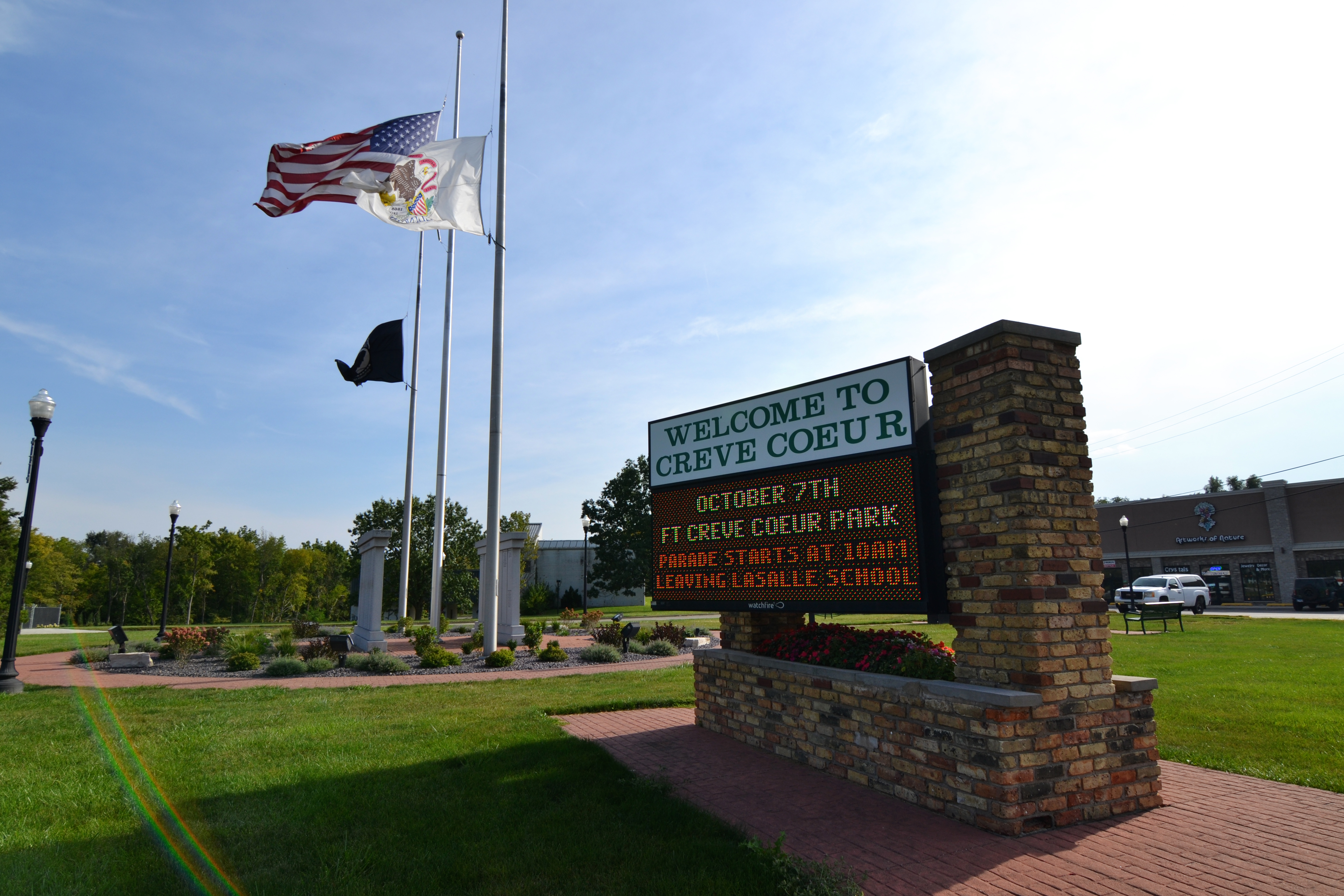
- Creve Coeur sign located by the Veterans Memorial
- Etymology: means "broken heart" in French
- Location of Creve Coeur in Tazewell County, Illinois.
- Coordinates: 40°37′54″N 89°37′40″W
- Country: United States
- State: Illinois
- County: Tazewell
- Township: Groveland
- First Settled: 1680
- Incorporated: 1921
- Named after: Fort Creve Coeur

Government
  - Mayor: Fred Lang
  - Village Trustee: Cara Paul
  - Village Trustee: Shanita Wallace
  - Village Trustee: Norma Dison
  - Village Trustee: Ron Talbot
  - Village Trustee: Terry Keogel

Area
  - Total: 4.55 sq mi (11.78 km^{2})
  - Land: 4.23 sq mi (10.96 km^{2})
  - Water: 0.32 sq mi (0.82 km^{2})
- Elevation: 663 ft (202 m)

Population (2020)
  - Total: 4,934
  - Estimate (2024): 4,832
  - Density: 1,166.2/sq mi (450.26/km^{2})
- Time zone: UTC-6 (CST)
  - Summer (DST): UTC-5 (CST)
- Zip code: 61610
- Area code: 309
- FIPS code: 17-17549
- GNIS feature ID: 2398651
- Website: www.villageofcc.com

Creve Coeur is a village in Groveland Township, Tazewell County, Illinois, United States. As of the 2020 census, the village population was 4,934. Creve Coeur is a suburb of Peoria and is part of the Peoria, Illinois Metropolitan Statistical Area.

== Geography ==
According to the 2010 census, Creve Coeur has a total area of 4.675 square miles (12.11 km^{2}), of which 4.31 square miles (11.16 km^{2}) (or 92.19%) is land and 0.365 square miles (0.95 km^{2}) (or 7.81%) is water.

== Demographics ==
Historical population
Census	Pop.	Note	%±
1930	350		—
1940	3,535		910.0%
1950	5,499		55.6%
1960	6,684		21.5%
1970	6,440		−3.7%
1980	6,851		6.4%
1990	5,938		−13.3%
2000	5,448		−8.3%
2010	5,451		0.1%
2020	4,934		−9.5%
U.S. Decennial Census

=== 2020 census ===
As of the 2020 census, Creve Coeur had a population of 4,934. The median age was 40.8 years. 20.3% of residents were under the age of 18 and 16.5% of residents were 65 years of age or older. For every 100 females there were 104.1 males, and for every 100 females age 18 and over there were 100.7 males age 18 and over.

98.7% of residents lived in urban areas, while 1.3% lived in rural areas.

There were 2,137 households in Creve Coeur, of which 24.4% had children under the age of 18 living in them. Of all households, 36.8% were married-couple households, 24.7% were households with a male householder and no spouse or partner present, and 27.6% were households with a female householder and no spouse or partner present. About 33.8% of all households were made up of individuals and 12.7% had someone living alone who was 65 years of age or older.

There were 2,408 housing units, of which 11.3% were vacant. The homeowner vacancy rate was 3.0% and the rental vacancy rate was 11.6%.

Racial composition as of the 2020 census
Race	Number	Percent
White	4,461	90.4%
Black or African American	69	1.4%
American Indian and Alaska Native	24	0.5%
Asian	19	0.4%
Native Hawaiian and Other Pacific Islander	3	0.1%
Some other race	56	1.1%
Two or more races	302	6.1%
Hispanic or Latino (of any race)	178	3.6%

=== 2000 census ===
At the 2000 census there were 5,448 people, 2,219 households, and 1,488 families in the village. The population density was 1,342.2 inhabitants per square mile (518.2/km^{2}). There were 2,476 housing units at an average density of 610.0 per square mile (235.5/km^{2}). The racial makeup of the village was 97.14% White, 0.39% African American, 0.53% Native American, 0.18% Asian, 0.02% Pacific Islander, 0.81% from other races, and 0.94% from two or more races. Hispanic or Latino of any race were 1.95%.

Of the 2,219 households 28.8% had children under the age of 18 living with them, 50.2% were married couples living together, 12.2% had a female householder with no husband present, and 32.9% were non-families. 27.2% of households were one person and 9.8% were one person aged 65 or older. The average household size was 2.46 and the average family size was 2.97.

The age distribution was 24.7% under the age of 18, 8.9% from 18 to 24, 30.5% from 25 to 44, 22.6% from 45 to 64, and 13.3% 65 or older. The median age was 36 years. For every 100 females, there were 97.9 males. For every 100 females age 18 and over, there were 95.2 males.

The median household income was $36,138 and the median family income was $41,006. Males had a median income of $32,188 versus $21,302 for females. The per capita income for the village was $16,712. About 4.5% of families and 7.3% of the population were below the poverty line, including 7.6% of those under age 18 and 5.5% of those age 65 or over.

== Transportation ==
CityLink provides bus service on Route 23 connecting Creve Coeur to downtown Peoria, downtown Pekin and other destinations.

== See also ==
- Fort Crevecoeur
- Creve Coeur, Missouri
