= Groveland Township, Tazewell County, Illinois =

Coordinates: 40°37′55″N 89°33′37″W

Groveland Township
- Township
- Location in Tazewell County
- Country: United States
- State: Illinois
- County: Tazewell
- Established: November 6, 1849

Area
  - Total: 38.26 sq mi (99.1 km^{2})
  - Land: 38.08 sq mi (98.6 km^{2})
  - Water: 0.18 sq mi (0.47 km^{2}) 0.47%

Population (2010)
  - Estimate (2016): 19,013
  - Density: 512.7/sq mi (198.0/km^{2})
- Time zone: UTC-6 (CST)
  - Summer (DST): UTC-5 (CDT)
- FIPS code: 17-179-31940
- Website: www.grovelandtownship.com

Groveland Township is located in Tazewell County, Illinois. As of the 2010 census, its population was 19,526 and it contained 8,441 housing units.

== Geography ==
According to the 2010 census, the township has a total area of 38.26 square miles (99.1 km^{2}), of which 38.08 square miles (98.6 km^{2}) (or 99.53%) is land and 0.18 square miles (0.47 km^{2}) (or 0.47%) is water.

== Demographics ==
Historical population
Census	Pop.	Note	%±
2016 (est.)	19,013
U.S. Decennial Census
