= List of bridges on the National Register of Historic Places in Illinois =

This is a list of bridges and tunnels on the National Register of Historic Places in the U.S. state of Illinois.

Name	Image	Built	Listed	Location	County	Type
Airtight Bridge		1914	1981-11-30	Charleston; 39°32′57″N 88°5′36″W	Coles	Pratt through-truss
Babylon Bend Bridge		ca. 1890	1980-10-29	Ellisville; 40°35′6″N 90°20′53″W	Fulton	Pratt
Bernadotte Bridge		1903	1980-10-29	Smithfield	Fulton	Pratt
Blakeman Bridge		1907	1981-11-30	Charleston; 39°26′58″N 88°9′1″W	Coles	triple arch, concrete
Bolivia Road Bridge		1901	2004-01-28	Bolivia; 39°46′9″N 89°20′44″W	Sangamon	Parker Through Truss
Bridge at Thirteenth Street		1909	2016-04-26	St. Francisville; 38°35′34.5″N 87°39′12″W	Lawrence	
Buckeye Bridge		1910	1980-10-29	Smithfield; 40°31′54″N 90°18′40″W	Fulton	Parker
Camelback Bridge		1880s	1997-05-15	Normal; 40°29′53.5″N 88°59′1″W	McLean	King post
Cemetery Road Bridge		1894	1998-05-20	Washington; 40°41′51″N 89°24′41″W	Tazewell	Stone double arch bridge
Chain of Rocks Bridge		1929, 1936	2006-12-01	Madison	Madison	Warren Truss
Chicago & North Western Railway Stone Arch Bridge		1882	1993-08-19	Roscoe; 42°24′57″N 88°59′51″W	Winnebago	Stone arch bridge
Duncan Mills Bridge		ca. 1910	1980-10-29	Lewistown	Fulton	Parker
Eads Bridge	Eads Bridge	1867, 1874	1966-10-15	East St. Louis; 38°37′45″N 90°11′8″W	St. Clair	Cantilever deck arch
Embarras River Bridge	Old Embarras River Bridge	1890	1998-05-20	Newton; 38°59′43″N 88°9′43″W	Jasper	Pratt through truss
Fall Creek Stone Arch Bridge		1855	1996-11-07	Payson; 39°47′6″N 91°18′8″W	Adams	stone arch bridge
Fountain Creek Bridge		1849	1978-12-22	Waterloo; 38°19′33″N 90°11′45″W	Monroe	
General Dean Suspension Bridge		1859	1973-04-03	Carlyle; 38°36′40″N 89°21′26″W	Clinton	
Harrison Street Bridge		1898	1981-11-30	Charleston; 39°29′8″N 88°6′57″W	Coles	Camelback Parker truss
Hazen Bridge		1893	1994-05-06	Mahomet; 40°15′9″N 88°23′1″W	Champaign	Pratt through truss
Illinois Central Stone Arch Railroad Bridges		1852, 1855	1987-12-02	Dixon	Lee	
Indian Ford Bridge		ca. 1917	1980-10-29	London Mills; 40°41′25″N 90°17′24″W	Fulton	Pratt
London Mills Bridge		1883	1980-10-29	London Mills; 40°42′36″N 90°16′0″W	Fulton	Pratt
Lyndon Bridge		1894, 1912	2003-05-09	Lyndon; 41°42′40″N 89°55′27″W	Whiteside	Parker Pratt through truss
Mary's River Covered Bridge		1854	1974-12-31	Chester; 37°56′55″N 89°45′57″W	Randolph	Burr Arch design
Ninth Street Seven Arch Stone Bridge		1868, 1869, 1902	2004-08-20	Lockport; 41°35′36″N 88°3′53″W	Will	Stone Arch Bridge
Old Stone Arch Bridge		ca. 1832	1978-11-28	Clark Center; 39°22′13″N 87°45′29″W	Clark	
Old Stone Arch, National Road		1831	1975-02-20	Marshall; 39°23′13″N 87°42′30″W	Clark	
Oquawka Wagon Bridge		1866	1975-02-24	Oquawka	Henderson	Burr Arch Truss
Red Covered Bridge		1863	1975-04-23	Princeton; 41°24′59″N 89°28′43″W	Bureau	
Savanna-Sabula Bridge		1931	1999-08-27	Savanna; 42°6′14″N 90°10′1″W	Carroll	Cantilever through truss
Seville Bridge		ca. 1880	1980-10-29	Seville	Fulton	Parker
Sixth, Seventh, and Tenth Street Stone Arch Bridges		1890s	2001-08-08	Charleston	Coles	Stone arch bridge
Stone Arch Bridge	Stone Arch Bridge	1860	1981-05-14	Champaign; 40°6′46″N 88°14′14″W	Champaign	
Stone Arch Bridge		1895, 1896	1986-05-16	Danville; 40°7′28″N 87°37′4″W	Jersey	Segmental Arch
Stone Quarry Bridge		1883	1981-11-30	Charleston; 39°30′47″N 88°6′57″W	Coles	double intersection Pratt
Sugar Creek Covered Bridge	Sugar Creek Covered Bridge	1827	1978-01-09	Chatham; 39°38′25″N 89°39′43″W	Sangamon	Wooden-trussed bridge
Sylvan Road Bridge	Sylvan Road Bridge	1915	1978-06-23	Glencoe; 42°8′40″N 87°45′48″W	Cook	Frank Lloyd Wright's only bridge
Tartar's Ferry Bridge		ca. 1880	1980-10-29	Smithfield	Fulton	Parker
Third Street Bridge (Delavan, Illinois)		1907	1999-05-20	Delavan; 40°22′24.6″N 89°32′40.5″W	Tazewell	Double int. Warren Double Po
Thompson Mill Covered Bridge		1868	1975-03-13	Cowden; 39°15′30″N 88°49′5″W	Shelby	
Waltmire Bridge		1910	1999-02-05	Tremont; 40°26′57.4″N 89°29′31″W	Tazewell	Pratt Through Truss
Elrod Bridge		ca. 1890	removed 1995-12-08	Smithfield	Fulton	
Wolf Covered Bridge		1848, 1874	removed 1995-12-08	Yates City; 40°51′24″N 90°6′36″W	Knox	Pratt truss
