= National Register of Historic Places listings in Tazewell County, Illinois =

Location of Tazewell County in Illinois

This is a list of the National Register of Historic Places listings in Tazewell County, Illinois.

This is intended to be a complete list of the properties and districts on the National Register of Historic Places in Tazewell County, Illinois, United States. Latitude and longitude coordinates are provided for many National Register properties and districts; these locations may be seen together in a map.

There are 17 properties and districts listed on the National Register in the county.

This National Park Service list is complete through NPS recent listings posted July 31, 2026.

== Current listings ==
	Name on the Register	Image	Date listed	Location	City or town	Description
1	Allentown Union Hall	Allentown Union Hall	August 12, 1988 (#88001228)	2 mi. E of IL 121; 40°33′19″N 89°23′50″W	Allentown	
2	Ayer Public Library	Ayer Public Library	November 12, 1998 (#98001352)	200 Locust St. 40°22′27″N 89°32′49″W	Delavan	
3	Cemetery Road Bridge	Cemetery Road Bridge	May 20, 1998 (#98000467)	Candlewood Dr. within Glendale Cemetery; 40°41′51″N 89°24′41″W	Washington	
4	Clear Lake Site		November 28, 1978 (#78001171)	Junction of 1200E and 2600N in Sand Ridge State Park; 40°26′08″N 89°54′00″W	Manito	Extends into Mason County
5	Delavan Commercial Historic District	Delavan Commercial Historic District	November 14, 1991 (#91001687)	307, 309-324, 400, 401, 404-410, 412, and 414 Locust St. 40°22′20″N 89°32′50″W	Delavan	
6	Dement-Zinser House	Dement-Zinser House	November 27, 2002 (#02001411)	105 Zinser Place; 40°42′16″N 89°24′26″W	Washington	
7	Denhart Bank Building	Denhart Bank Building	August 12, 2005 (#05000874)	101 Washington Square; 40°42′14″N 89°24′24″W	Washington	
8	Farm Creek Section	Farm Creek Section	February 6, 1992 (#91002039)	S side of Farm Creek; 40°40′38″N 89°29′23″W	East Peoria	
9	Carl Herget Mansion	Carl Herget Mansion	August 18, 1992 (#92001005)	420 Washington St. 40°33′52″N 89°38′47″W	Pekin	
10	Illinois Traction System Mackinaw Depot	Illinois Traction System Mackinaw Depot	November 30, 1978 (#78001192)	301 N. Main St. 40°32′22″N 89°21′33″W	Mackinaw	
11	North Eighth Street Plaza	North Eighth Street Plaza	May 18, 2015 (#15000226)	1500-1532 N. 8th St. 40°34′53″N 89°38′27″W	Pekin	
12	Pekin Federal Building	Pekin Federal Building	October 9, 1980 (#80001412)	334 Elizabeth St. 40°34′08″N 89°38′55″W	Pekin	
13	Peoria Lock and Dam Historic District	Peoria Lock and Dam Historic District	March 10, 2004 (#04000169)	1071 Wesley Rd. 40°37′55″N 89°37′28″W	Creve Coeur	
14	St. Louis, Peoria and Northern Railroad Depot	St. Louis, Peoria and Northern Railroad Depot	December 6, 2004 (#04001305)	1900 block of Broadway St. 40°34′02″N 89°37′24″W	Pekin	
15	Tazewell County Courthouse	Tazewell County Courthouse	November 14, 1985 (#85002837)	Court St. between Capitol and Fourth Sts. 40°34′09″N 89°38′52″W	Pekin	
16	Third Street Bridge	Third Street Bridge	May 20, 1999 (#99000586)	Third St., bet. Pine and Elm Sts. 40°22′25″N 89°32′41″W	Delavan	
17	Waltmire Bridge	Waltmire Bridge	February 5, 1999 (#99000112)	Locust Rd. over Mackinaw River, approx. 4.9 mi. S of Tremont; 40°26′57″N 89°29′31″W	Tremont	

== Former listing ==
	Name on the Register	Image	Date listed	Date removed	Location	City or town	Description
1	Pekin Theatre		October 12, 1982 (#82002601)	July 30, 1987	21-29 S. Capitol St.	Pekin	Demolished in 1987

== See also ==
- List of National Historic Landmarks in Illinois
- National Register of Historic Places listings in Illinois
