= Bolivia Road Bridge =

- U.S. National Register of Historic Places
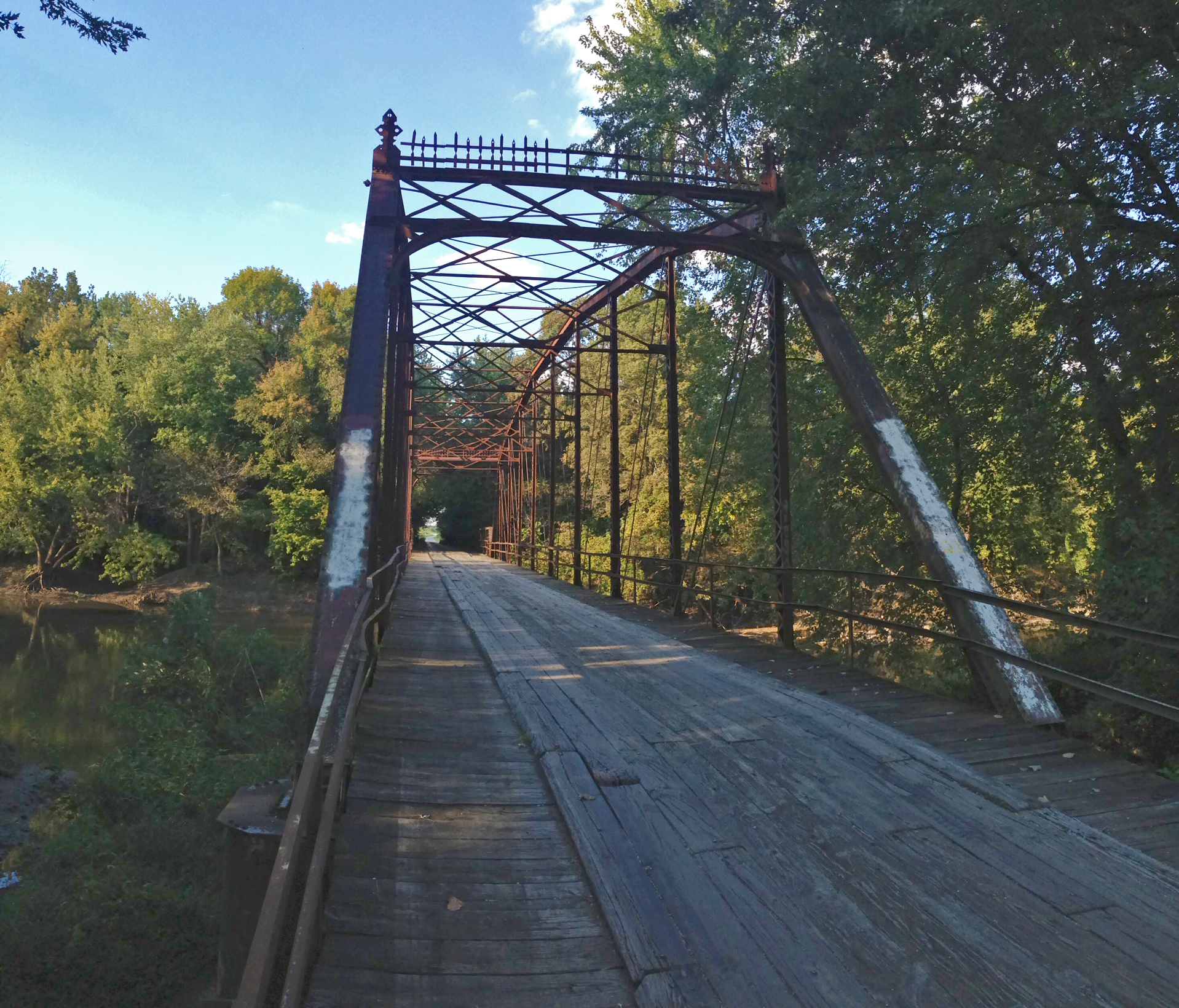
- Looking north at the bridge

- Location within Illinois Location within the United States
- Nearest city: Bolivia, Illinois
- Coordinates: 39°46′9″N 89°20′44″W
- Area: less than one acre
- Built: 1901
- Built by: Garrett, J.T.
- Architectural style: Parker Through Truss
- NRHP reference No.: 03001464
- Added to NRHP: January 28, 2004

The Bolivia Road Bridge is a truss bridge near Bolivia, Illinois, which formerly carried Bolivia Road across the Sangamon River. The bridge's main span is a Parker through truss, and the structure also includes a pony truss and several I-beam trusses. Plans to construct the bridge began in 1900, when Lanesville Township's highway commissioner petitioned Sangamon County for funds for a bridge. Funding on the bridge ultimately came from a joint effort by Lanesville Township, Sangamon County, Christian County, and Christian County's Mount Auburn Township, as the latter two areas were connected to Sangamon County by the bridge. J.T. Garrett of St. Louis, Missouri built the bridge in 1901. A 1994 state bridge survey identified the bridge as one of seven remaining Parker through truss bridges in Illinois, one of which has since been demolished.

The bridge was added to the National Register of Historic Places on January 28, 2004. The bridge was listed on Landmarks Illinois' Ten Most Endangered Historic Places list in 2011.

In the spring of 2015, a single-car accident prompted county officials to permanently close the bridge.

== Gallery ==
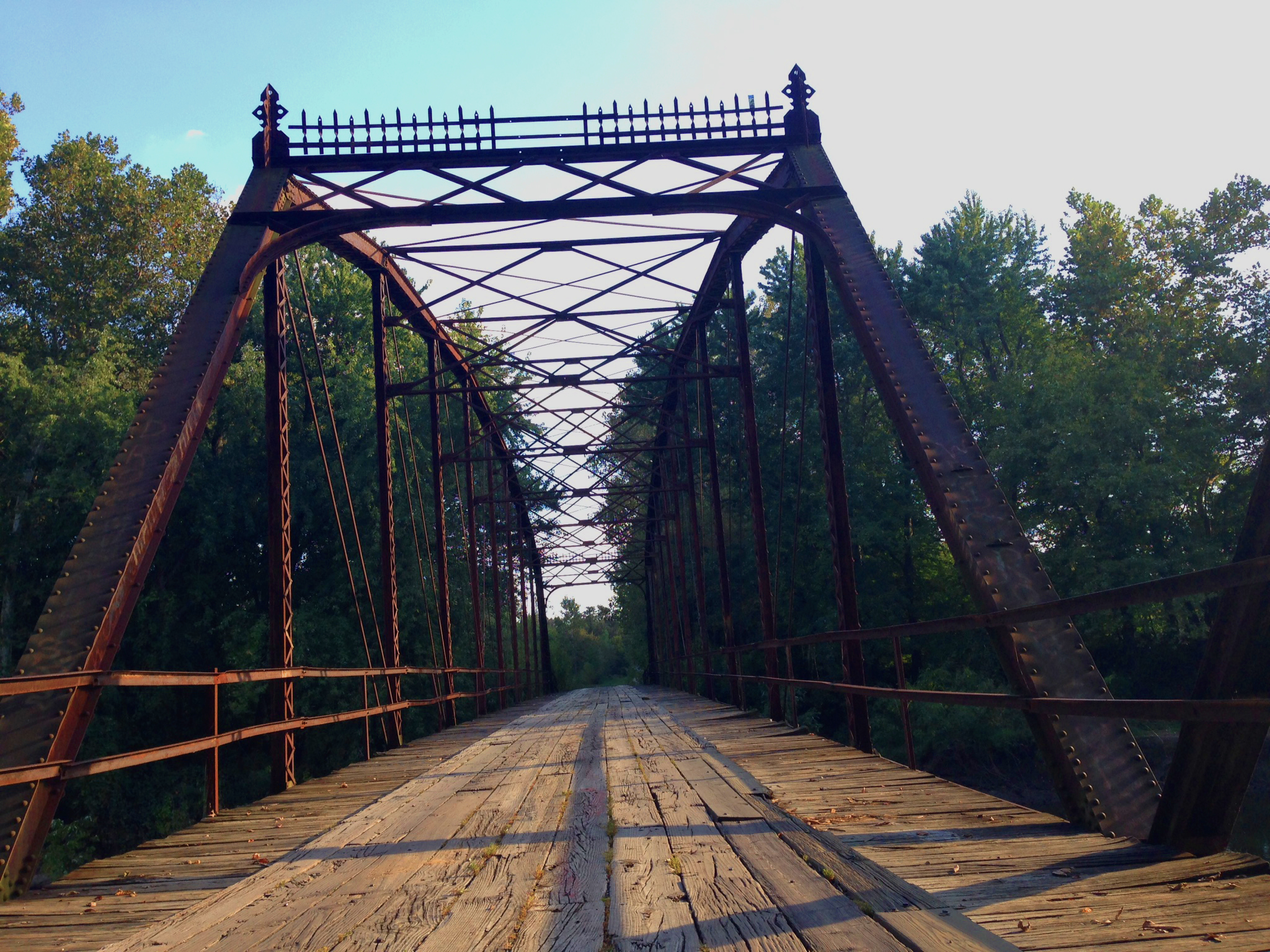
Looking south at the bridge

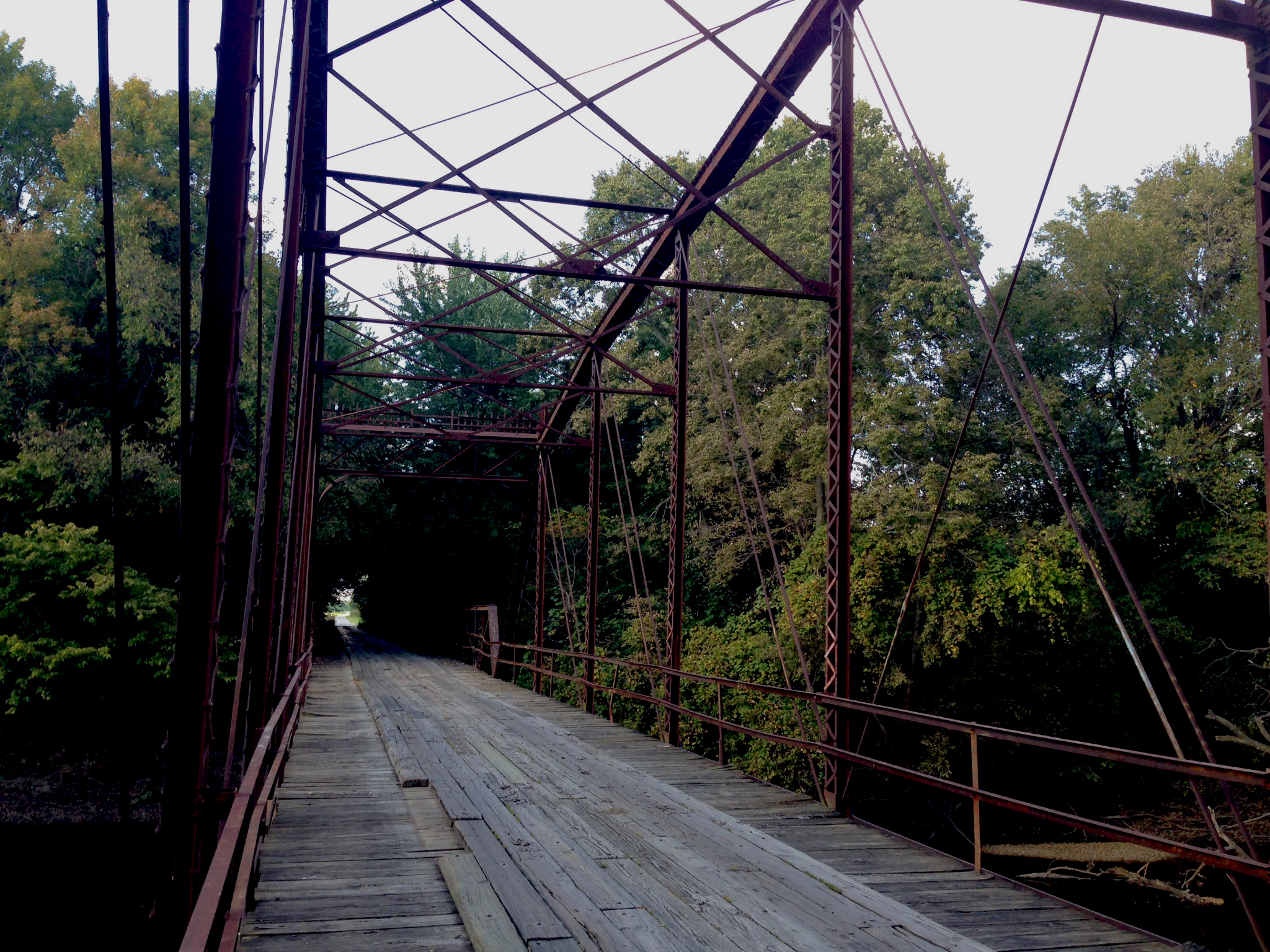
Middle of the bridge
