= Ayer Public Library (Delavan, Illinois) =

Carnegie library in Delavan, Illinois, US

- U.S. National Register of Historic Places
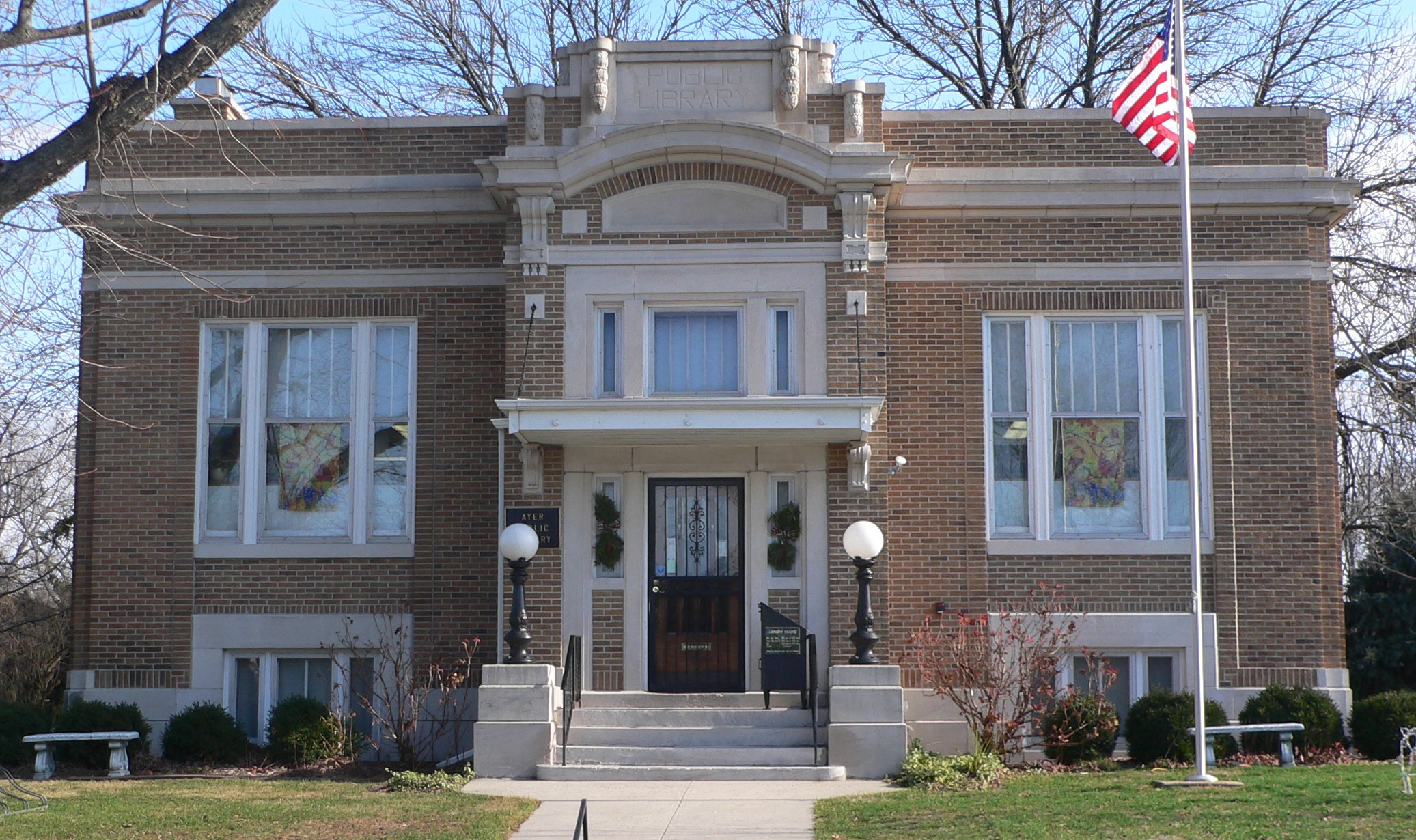

- Location within Illinois Location within the United States
- Location: 208 Locust St., Delavan, Illinois
- Coordinates: 40°22′27″N 89°32′49″W
- Area: less than one acre
- Built: 1914
- Built by: Lillibridge, Ray
- Architect: Simmons, A.T.
- Architectural style: Classical Revival
- MPS: Illinois Carnegie Libraries MPS
- NRHP reference No.: 98001352
- Added to NRHP: November 12, 1998

The Ayer Public Library is a Carnegie library located at 208 Locust Street in Delavan, Illinois.

== History ==
The library was the city's fifth attempt at forming a library; it succeeded and assumed the collection of a library founded in 1902 by the Blue Button Army temperance organization. When the Blue Button library closed in 1907, supporter Amos K. Ayer called for the city to establish a permanent public library.

With Ayer's financial backing, a library for all citizens of Delavan Township was approved in 1907; however, it used a temporary space and lacked a permanent home until the city applied to the Carnegie Foundation for assistance in 1912. After a protracted misunderstanding with James Bertram, who expected a city library tax and did not understand that the township provided tax support, the Foundation provided a $10,000 grant for the library and construction began in 1914. The Classical Revival library opened later in the year; it remains open to this day.

The library was added to the National Register of Historic Places on November 12, 1998.
