= Grove City, Illinois =

- Unincorporated community
- Location within Illinois Location within the United States
- Coordinates: 39°42′24″N 89°17′49″W
- Country: United States
- State: Illinois
- County: Christian
- Elevation: 607 ft (185 m)
- Time zone: UTC-6 (Central (CST))
  - Summer (DST): UTC-5 (CDT)
- Area code: 217
- GNIS feature ID: 409535

Grove City is an unincorporated community in Christian County, Illinois, United States. It lies at 39°42′24″N 89°17′49″W.

It has been rumored that Bonnie and Clyde used a house in Grove City as a hideout while running from the law. The house still stands today, however, it is in very poor condition.

The Grove City Methodist Cemetery is located in Mount Auburn Township.

Frank P. Sadler (1872–1931), Illinois state senator and lawyer, lived on a farm near Grove City.
