= Mount Auburn Township, Christian County, Illinois =

Mount Auburn Township
- Township
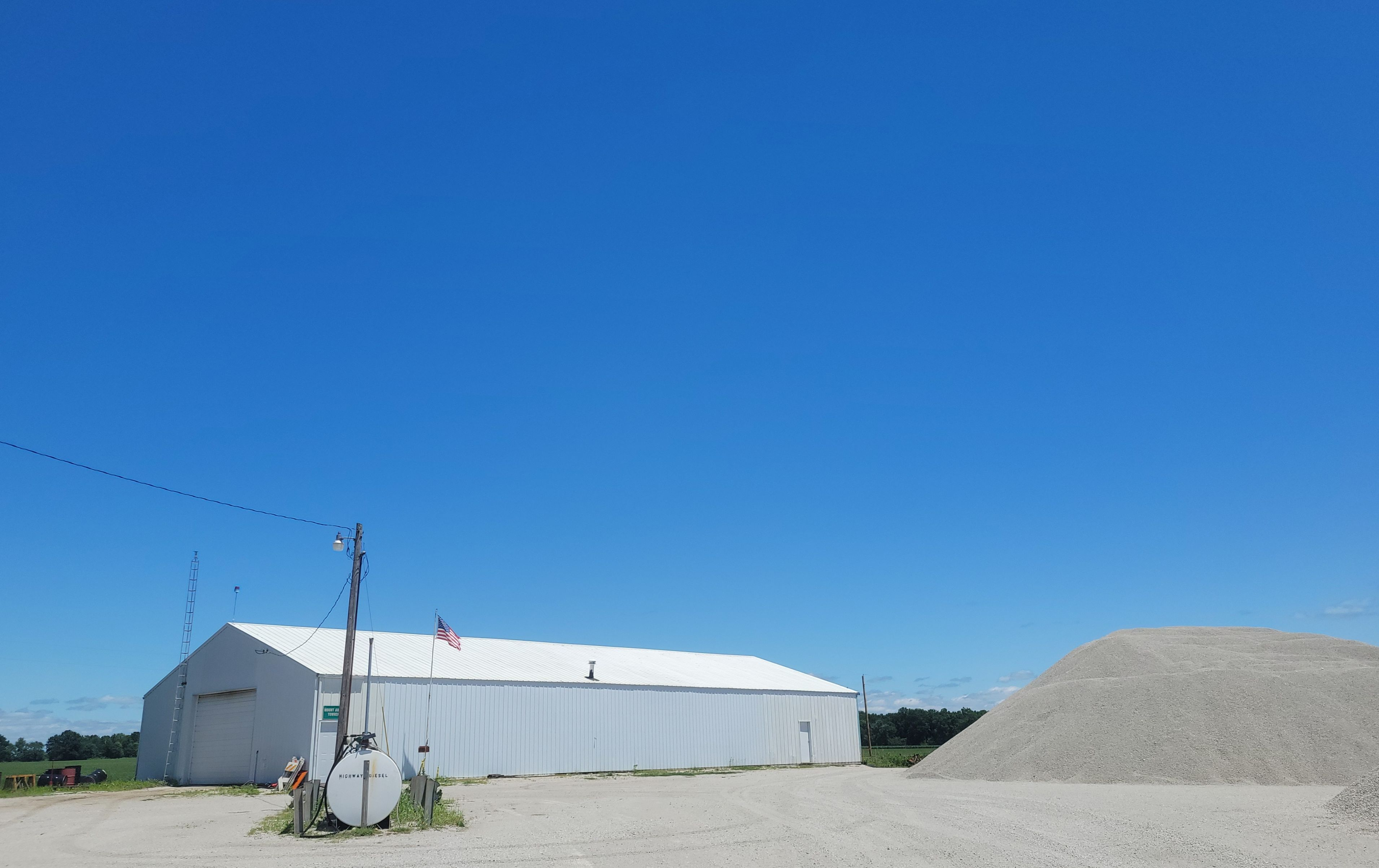
- Township building near Mount Auburn

- Location in Christian County

- Christian County's location in Illinois
- Coordinates: 39°43′51″N 89°19′42″W
- Country: United States
- State: Illinois
- County: Christian
- Established: November 7, 1865

Area
  - Total: 45.78 sq mi (118.6 km^{2})
  - Land: 45.74 sq mi (118.5 km^{2})
  - Water: 0.03 sq mi (0.078 km^{2}) 0.07%
- Elevation: 594 ft (181 m)

Population (2020)
  - Total: 912
  - Density: 19.9/sq mi (7.70/km^{2})
- Time zone: UTC-6 (CST)
  - Summer (DST): UTC-5 (CDT)
- ZIP codes: 62513, 62515, 62531, 62545, 62547, 62563
- FIPS code: 17-021-50842

Mount Auburn Township is one of seventeen townships in Christian County, Illinois, USA. As of the 2020 census, its population was 912 and it contained 435 housing units.

== Geography ==
According to the 2010 census, the township has a total area of 45.78 square miles (118.6 km^{2}), of which 45.74 square miles (118.5 km^{2}) (or 99.91%) is land and 0.03 square miles (0.078 km^{2}) (or 0.07%) is water.

=== Cities, towns, villages ===
- Mount Auburn

=== Unincorporated towns ===
- Bolivia at 39.742268°N 89.34703°W
- Grove City at 39.706711°N 89.297029°W
- Roby at 39.739214°N 89.399255°W

=== Cemeteries ===
The township contains these five cemeteries: Furrow, Grove City Methodist, Hinckle, Milligan and Mount Auburn.

=== Airports and landing strips ===
- Hardy Airport

== Demographics ==
Historical population
Census	Pop.	Note	%±
1870	1,640		—
1880	1,741		6.2%
1890	1,546		−11.2%
1900	1,440		−6.9%
1910	1,634		13.5%
1920	1,677		2.6%
1930	1,281		−23.6%
1940	1,451		13.3%
1950	1,246		−14.1%
1960	1,196		−4.0%
1970	1,159		−3.1%
1980	1,215		4.8%
1990	1,112		−8.5%
2000	1,031		−7.3%
2010	1,028		−0.3%
2020	912		−11.3%
U.S. Decennial Census

As of the 2020 census there were 912 people, 427 households, and 277 families residing in the township. The population density was 19.92 inhabitants per square mile (7.69/km^{2}). There were 435 housing units at an average density of 9.50 per square mile (3.67/km^{2}). The racial makeup of the township was 94.41% White, 0.22% African American, 0.22% Native American, 0.33% Asian, 0.00% Pacific Islander, 0.77% from other races, and 4.06% from two or more races. Hispanic or Latino of any race were 0.77% of the population.

There were 427 households, out of which 34.40% had children under the age of 18 living with them, 62.06% were married couples living together, 1.17% had a female householder with no spouse present, and 35.13% were non-families. 26.70% of all households were made up of individuals, and 15.50% had someone living alone who was 65 years of age or older. The average household size was 2.29 and the average family size was 2.80.

The township's age distribution consisted of 21.6% under the age of 18, 6.6% from 18 to 24, 28% from 25 to 44, 27.3% from 45 to 64, and 16.5% who were 65 years of age or older. The median age was 40.9 years. For every 100 females, there were 115.5 males. For every 100 females age 18 and over, there were 98.2 males.

The median income for a household in the township was $56,797, and the median income for a family was $68,098. Males had a median income of $36,086 versus $30,645 for females. The per capita income for the township was $27,498. About 2.5% of families and 5.9% of the population were below the poverty line, including none of those under age 18 and 2.5% of those age 65 or over.

== School districts ==
- Edinburg Community Unit School District 4
- Rochester Community Unit School District 3a
- Taylorville Community Unit School District 3

== Political districts ==
- State House District 87
- State Senate District 44
