= Frank P. Sadler =

American politician

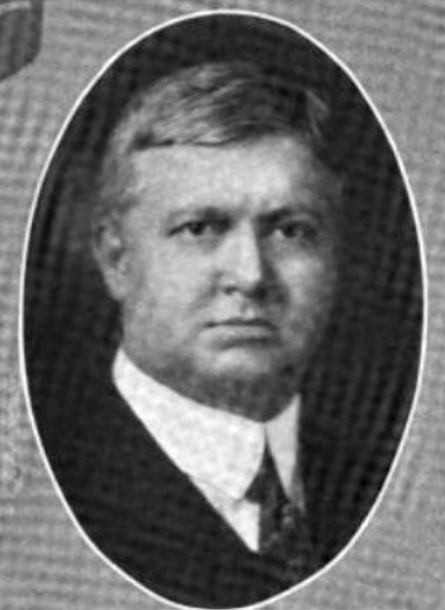

Member of the Illinois State Senate
- In office 1918–1922

Personal details
- Born: Frank Prather Sadler; June 30, 1872 Springfield, Illinois
- Died: April 30, 1931 (aged 58) Chicago, Illinois
- Party: Republican
- Education: Valparaiso University; Knox College; University of Michigan
- Occupation: Lawyer, politician

Frank Prather Sadler (June 30, 1872 – April 30, 1931) was an American politician and lawyer.

== Biography ==
Sadler was born in Springfield, Illinois, and had lived on a farm, near Grove City, Illinois, in Christian County, Illinois. He went to the local public schools. Sadler studied at Valparaiso University and at Knox College in Galesburg, Illinois. Sadler received his bachelor's and law degrees from University of Michigan. Sadler practiced law in Chicago, and served as judge of the Chicago Municipal Court. Sadler served in the Illinois State Senate from 1919 to 1923, from Chicago, and was a Republican. Sadler died at Passavant Hospital in Chicago.
