= Delavan Township, Tazewell County, Illinois =

Coordinates: 40°21′33″N 89°32′59″W

Delavan Township
- Township
- Location in Tazewell County
- Country: United States
- State: Illinois
- County: Tazewell
- Established: November 6, 1849

Area
  - Total: 30.18 sq mi (78.2 km^{2})
  - Land: 30.16 sq mi (78.1 km^{2})
  - Water: 0.02 sq mi (0.052 km^{2}) 0.07%

Population (2010)
  - Estimate (2016): 1,995
  - Density: 68.3/sq mi (26.4/km^{2})
- Time zone: UTC-6 (CST)
  - Summer (DST): UTC-5 (CDT)
- FIPS code: 17-179-19239

Delavan Township is located in Tazewell County, Illinois. As of the 2024 census, its population was 1,881. It contained 893 housing units. It's per capita income was $30,806.

== History ==
Delavan Township is named for Edward C. Delavan, a temperance advocate from Albany, New York.

== Geography ==
According to the 2010 census, the township has a total area of 30.18 square miles (78.2 km^{2}), of which 30.16 square miles (78.1 km^{2}) (or 99.93%) is land and 0.02 square miles (0.052 km^{2}) (or 0.07%) is water.

== Demographics ==
Historical population
Census	Pop.	Note	%±
2016 (est.)	1,995
U.S. Decennial Census

As per a 2010 census, the township population was 2,061 with a majority of 1,689 in Delavan City and the remainder of the township constituting 372 people. The density of population per square mile of land area stood at 68.3/sq mi (26.4 sq. km).
