= Farm Creek Section =

Hillside near East Peoria, Illinois

- U.S. National Register of Historic Places
- U.S. National Historic Landmark
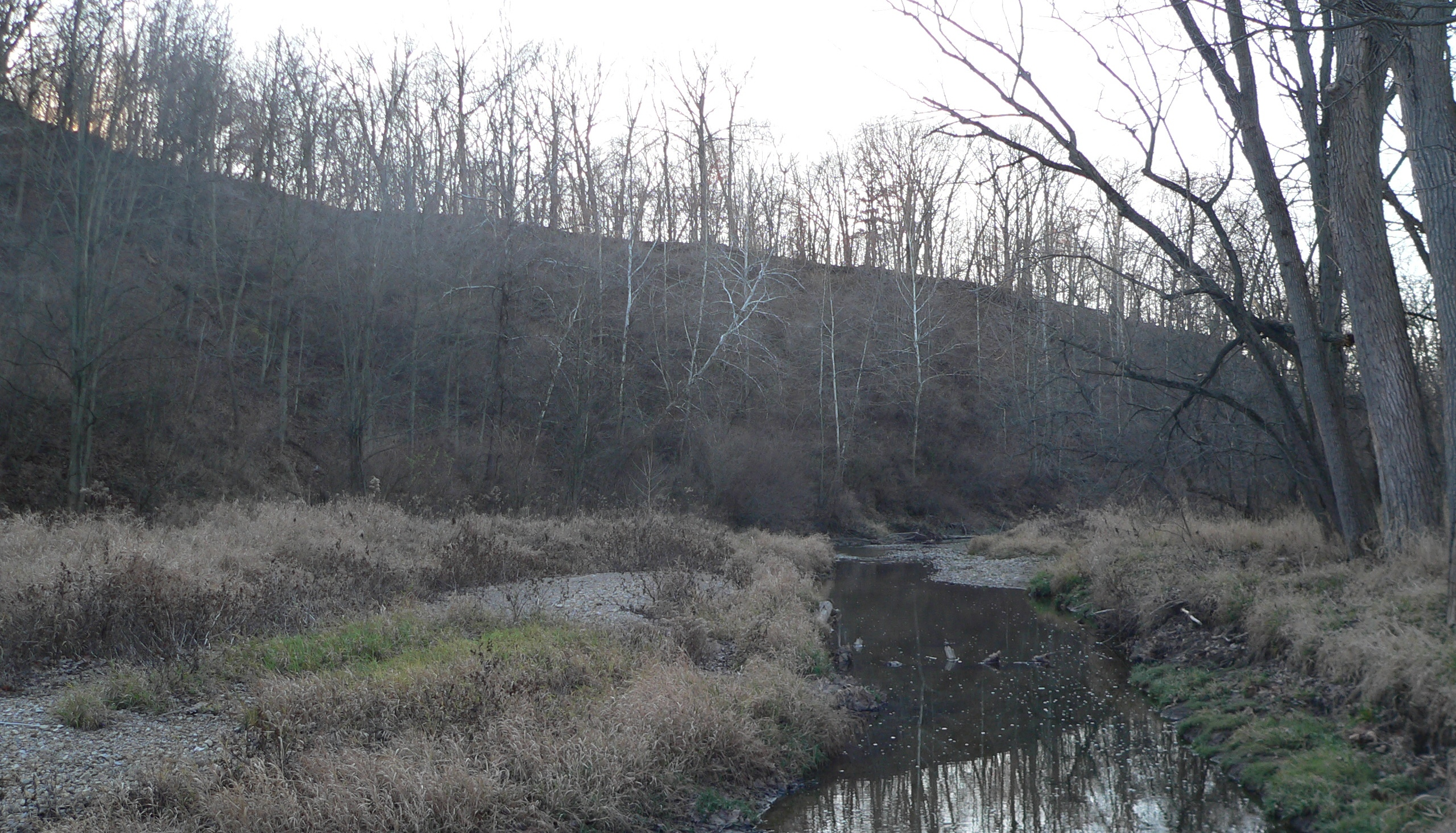
- Looking downstream along Farm Creek; the geological exposure is in the eroded hillside at left.

- Location within Illinois
- Nearest city: East Peoria, Illinois
- Coordinates: 40.67550°N 89.48980°W
- Area: 15 acres (6.1 ha)
- NRHP reference No.: 91002039

Significant dates
- Added to NRHP: February 6, 1992
- Designated NHL: December 9, 1997

The Farm Creek Section, also known as the Farmdale Geologic Exposure, is a hillside near East Peoria, Illinois that clearly showed geological strata. It is nationally significant as one of the first exposed glacial stratifications in the United States to be scientifically documented. These Ice Age geological formations, with rock layers representing different periods of glaciation, had long been known and published in England, France, and Germany, but were not yet well known in North America. Geologist Frank Leverett discovered this exposed face of a hill with its clearly defined stratifications in 1879 and described and pictured it in his monograph, The Illinois Glacial Lobe, in 1899.

The Farm Creek publication gave a name to the Illinoian glaciation, the southernmost penetration of glacial ice into what was to become the Midwestern United States. It also helped formulate regional and national stratigraphic classifications and has figured prominently in the study and development of glacial geology.

A 15-acre (6.1 ha) area of the Farm Creek Section was declared a National Historic Landmark in 1997.

The site is on the south side of Farm Creek (a tributary of the Illinois River) in the Farm Creek Recreation Area, south of Illinois Route 8 (Washington St.) and between School Street and Bittersweet Road, and is accessible by following an unpaved road, part of which is an abandoned right of way formerly in use by the Toledo, Peoria and Western Railroad. The formation is largely covered by a modern soil layer. Some erosion has occurred in the time since its initial discovery, but the layers of strata are still readily discernible.

Approximate UTM border of Farm Creek Section
Point	Zone	Easting	Northing	Longitude/Latitude
A	16N	289700	4505760	40.67592°N 89.48828°W
B	16N	289700	4505620	40.67592°N 89.48828°W
C	16N	289460	4505640	40.67478°N 89.49108°W
D	16N	289440	4505820	40.67640°N 89.49138°W

== See also ==
- List of National Historic Landmarks in Illinois
- National Register of Historic Places listings in Tazewell County, Illinois
