= Allentown, Illinois =

- Unincorporated community
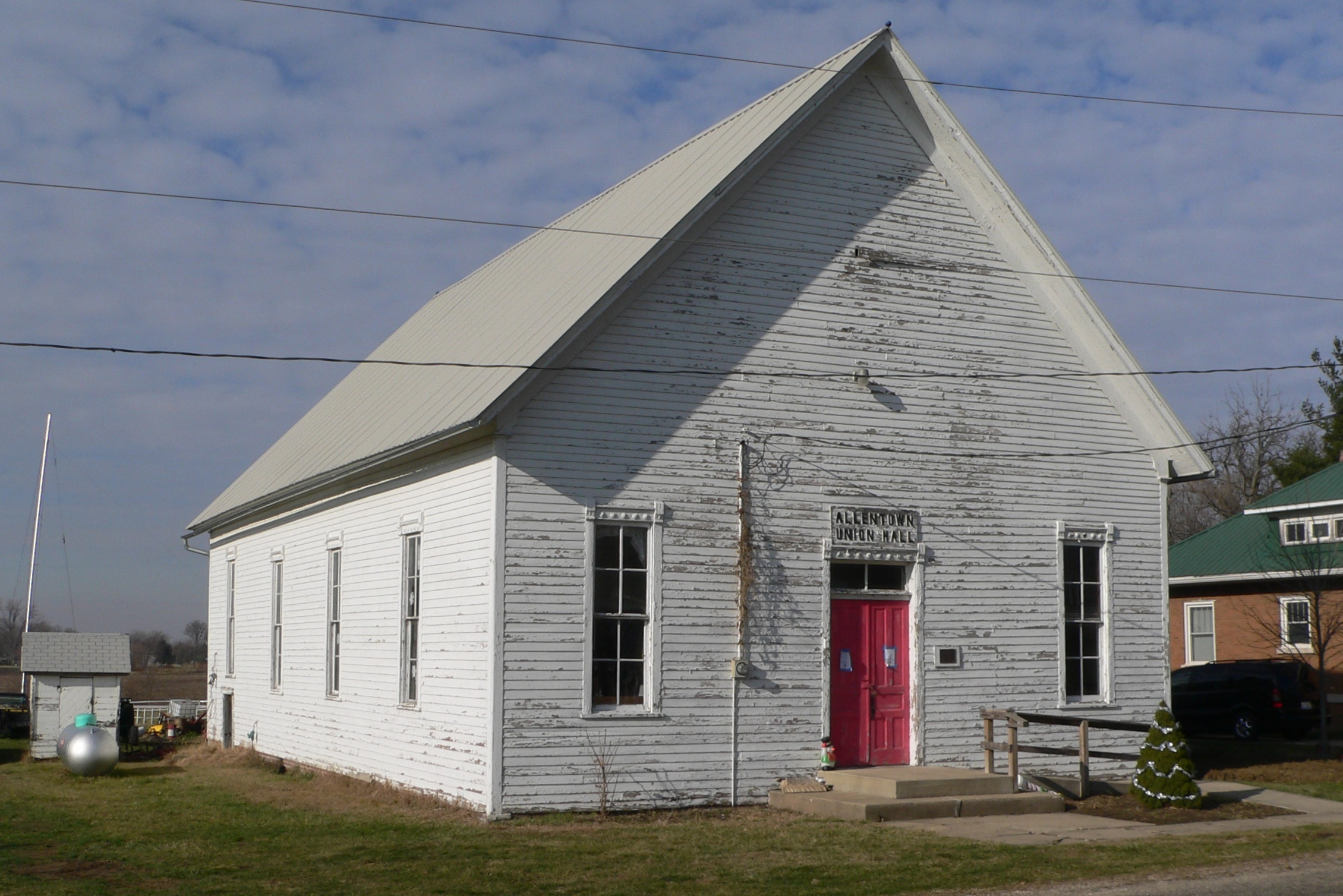
- Allentown Union Hall

- Location of Allentown, Illinois Allentown, Illinois (Illinois)
- Coordinates: 40°33′21″N 89°23′48″W
- Country: United States
- State: Illinois
- County: Tazewell
- Elevation: 679 ft (207 m)
- Time zone: UTC-6 (Central (CST))
  - Summer (DST): UTC-5 (CDT)
- Area code: 309
- GNIS feature ID: 422400

Allentown is an unincorporated community in Tazewell County, Illinois, United States. Allentown is in the Tremont Township, though it is closer to Mackinaw than to Tremont. Allentown is 2.5 miles (4.0 km) northwest of Mackinaw and 6 miles (9.7 km) northeast of Tremont.

== History ==
The community derives its name from one Edward James Allen (1810–1889). The name “Allentown” first appears on the Tremont Township plat map found in the 1891 Tazewell County atlas. According to local lore, Mr. Allen had made up the name "Allentown" in 1873 in order to appease the railroad shipping clerk who required each cattle stop to be named. Allentown was a station of the Illinois Terminal Railroad interurban system for a number of years.

A plat map in the 1864 Tazewell County atlas indicates that a country school house was located near the center of Allentown. A plat map in the 1873 Tazewell County atlas shows that same school as the township's School House No. 3. According to locals, the location of the school was changed several times from 1873 to 1946 when the final school house building was destroyed by a fire.

A store and post office was established at Allentown in 1879, and remained in operation until 1955.

In the year 1892 residents of Allentown built a community hall, called the Allentown Union Hall, where community celebrations, church services, club meetings, local elections, and performances by traveling musicians and vaudevillians were held.

The hall was added to the National Register of Historic Places on August 12, 1988.

== Geography ==
Allentown is located at 40°33′21″N 89°23′48″W (40.555833, -89.396667).

== Demographics ==
Since Allentown is an unincorporated community, the official population is not known. However, Allentown is made up of approximately 24 houses, which gives an unofficial population somewhere between 50 and 100.
