= Delavan Commercial Historic District =

Historic district in Illinois, United States

- U.S. National Register of Historic Places
- U.S. Historic district
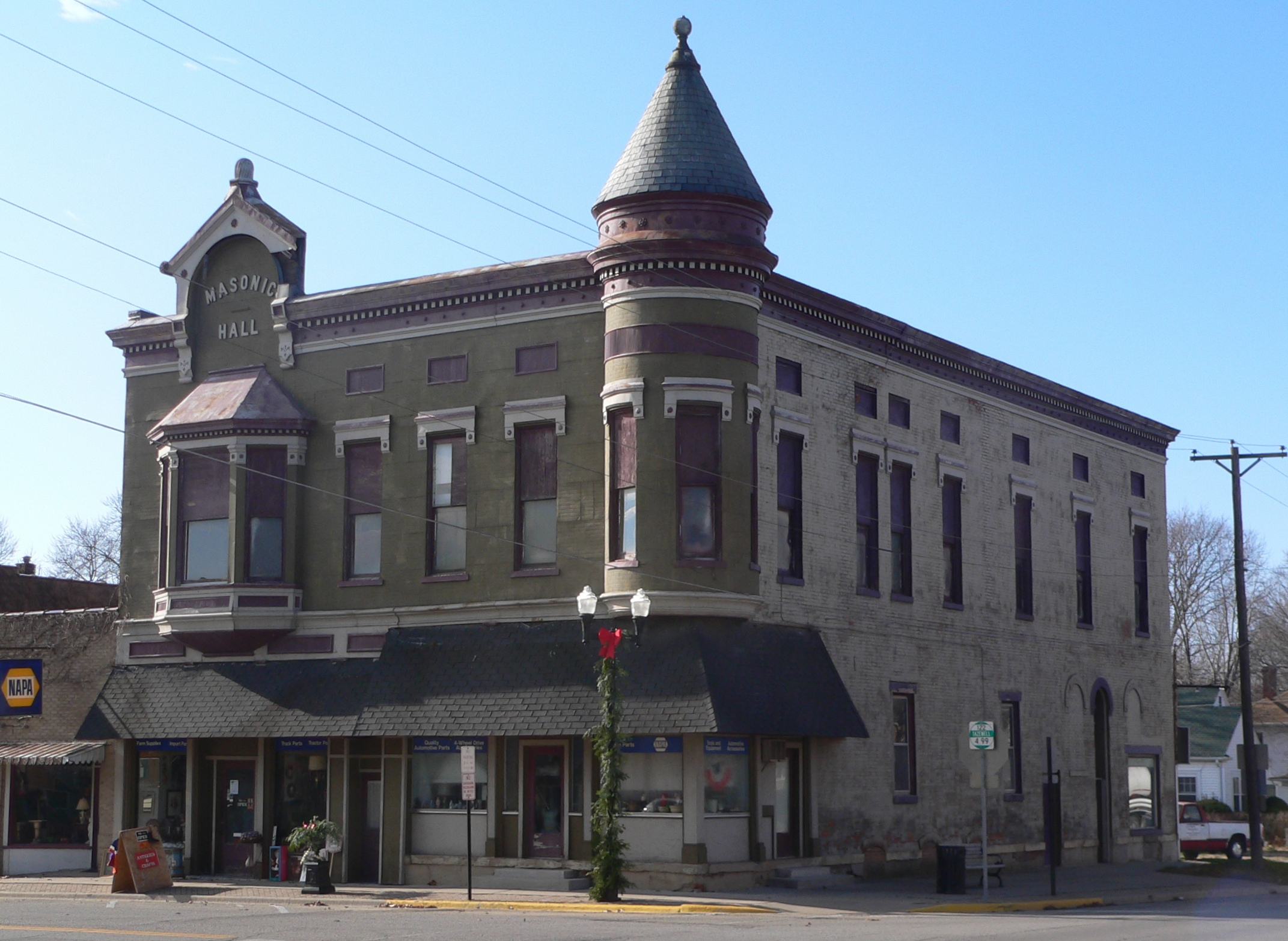
- Masonic Hall at 401 Locust Street

- Location within Illinois Location within the United States
- Location: 307, 309--324, 400, 401, 404--410, 412 and 414 Locust St., Delavan, Illinois
- Coordinates: 40°22′20″N 89°32′50″W
- Area: 3.4 acres (1.4 ha)
- Architectural style: Italianate, Queen Anne
- NRHP reference No.: 91001687
- Added to NRHP: November 14, 1991

The Delavan Commercial Historic District is a historic district in downtown Delavan, Illinois. The district includes 26 buildings along two blocks of Locust Street, 20 of which are contributing buildings. The oldest buildings in the district, two simple brick commercial structures, were built around 1860. The remaining buildings were mainly built later in the 19th century, with a few built during the early 20th century. The buildings mostly have either Italianate or vernacular commercial designs, as was typical for commercial buildings of the period. Several of the buildings feature decorative metal elements such as storefronts, cornices, and window treatments. One notable exception to this design trend is the Masonic Hall at 401 Locust Street, which has a Queen Anne design featuring a large turret.

The district was added to the National Register of Historic Places on November 14, 1991.
