= Lyndon Bridge =

US bridge in Lyndon IL

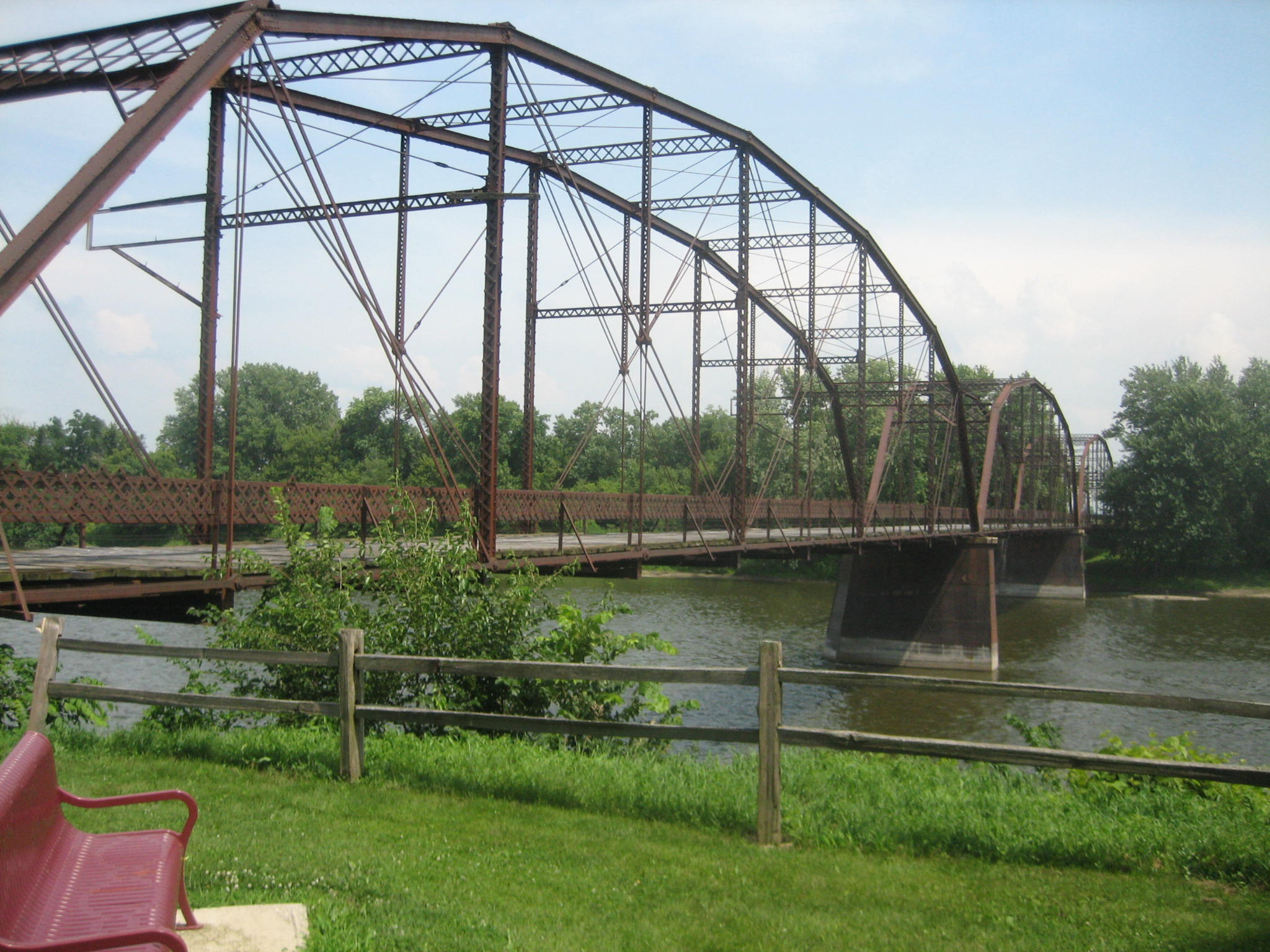
- Coordinates: 41°42′40″N 89°55′30″W
- Carries: pedestrian traffic
- Crosses: Rock River
- Locale: Lyndon, Illinois
- Maintained by: Village of Lyndon

Characteristics
- Design: Parker Pratt through truss bridge
- Total length: 600 feet (183 m)
- Longest span: 200 feet (61 m)

History
- Construction start: 1891
- Opened: 1894, 1998
- Lyndon Bridge
- U.S. National Register of Historic Places
- Location within Illinois Location within the United States
- Location: S end of 6th Ave. W, Lyndon, Illinois
- Coordinates: 41°42′41.3″N 89°55′29.1″W
- Area: less than one acre
- Built: 1894
- Architect: R.S. Riser
- Architectural style: Parker Pratt through truss
- NRHP reference No.: 03000353
- Added to NRHP: May 9, 2003

Location
- Interactive map of Lyndon Bridge

The Lyndon Bridge is a metal Parker Pratt through truss bridge in the village of Lyndon, Whiteside County, Illinois, United States. The Lyndon Bridge was designed by engineer R.S. Riser and completed in 1894 for around $20,000. Whiteside County maintained the bridge from its construction until it was closed to all traffic in 1980. In 1995, as the county was about to demolish the bridge, a group of citizens worked together and saved it from demolition. The bridge was listed on the U.S. National Register of Historic Places in 2003.

== History ==
The idea of a bridge in Lyndon was first proposed in 1876, but it was not approved until 1891.

In 1876 the village of Lyndon first approached Whiteside County officials about the construction of a bridge over the Rock River in the village. That petition was denied and the county was not approached about a Lyndon bridge again until 1891, when the county agreed the village needed a bridge. The county appointed a bridge committee and the project began. The bridge committee first met on June 30, 1891 on the site of Lyndon Bridge. At another meeting, on February 18, 1892, the committee decided to seek bids for the construction of the bridge. At the same meeting the committee selected R.S. Riser, an engineer, to plan and design the bridge for a cost of no more than $50; Riser was paid the full $50. The committee received eight bids at another meeting, held on March 10, 1892. The bids ranged from the lowest at $16,400 to the highest at $19,127. The bridge committee ultimately went with the lowest bid from Keefers & Wyncoop.

The committee continued to meet after the contract was awarded, deciding various aspects of construction details and employment on the project. For instance, during a July 1894 meeting the committee employed a man to watch the bridge's construction for $1.50 per day; they ended up paying him a total of slightly more than $56. The bridge was completed in late 1894 for a total cost of $19,606.25.

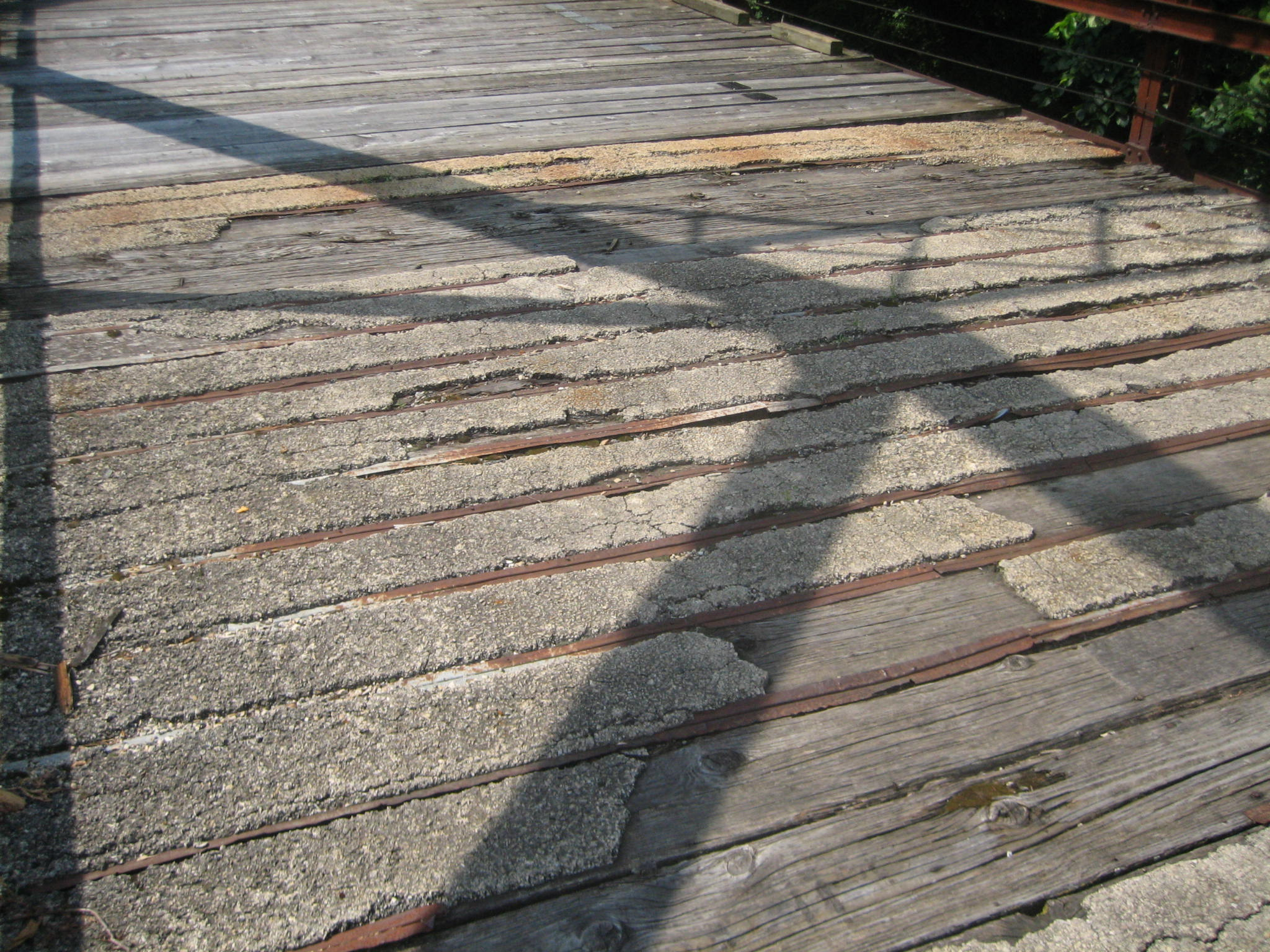
The wooden bridge deck has been replaced four times, most recently in 1976.

When the bridge was first constructed it was designed to primarily support wagon traffic. As technology progressed, and automobiles and tractors became more common, Whiteside County officials were prompted to make alterations to the bridge in 1906. During the work the original wood stringers were replaced with 7-inch (180 mm) steel I-beams, a new wood deck was laid and steel lattice rails were added. The bridge continued to require maintenance and persistent flooding required the county to add another span to the bridge in 1912. The new span lifted the bridge out of and over the flood plain.

Throughout its history the Whiteside County Highway Department kept detailed records of their maintenance on Lyndon Bridge. The wooden deck of the bridge has been replaced four times - in 1906, 1920, 1968, and 1976.

In 1920 the bridge deck needed repair. The repairs were completed and the bridge repainted, marking the last time Lyndon Bridge was painted. In 1939 the south pier began to settle into the riverbed. The concrete piling and some of the concrete inside the pier's steel casing was deteriorating. The dilapidated concrete in the casing was replaced and a new concrete footing was poured. In 1968 the abutment on which the bridge's south approach rests was repaired and a new deck installed at a cost of $6,800. The deck was again replaced in 1976 for an additional $4,500.

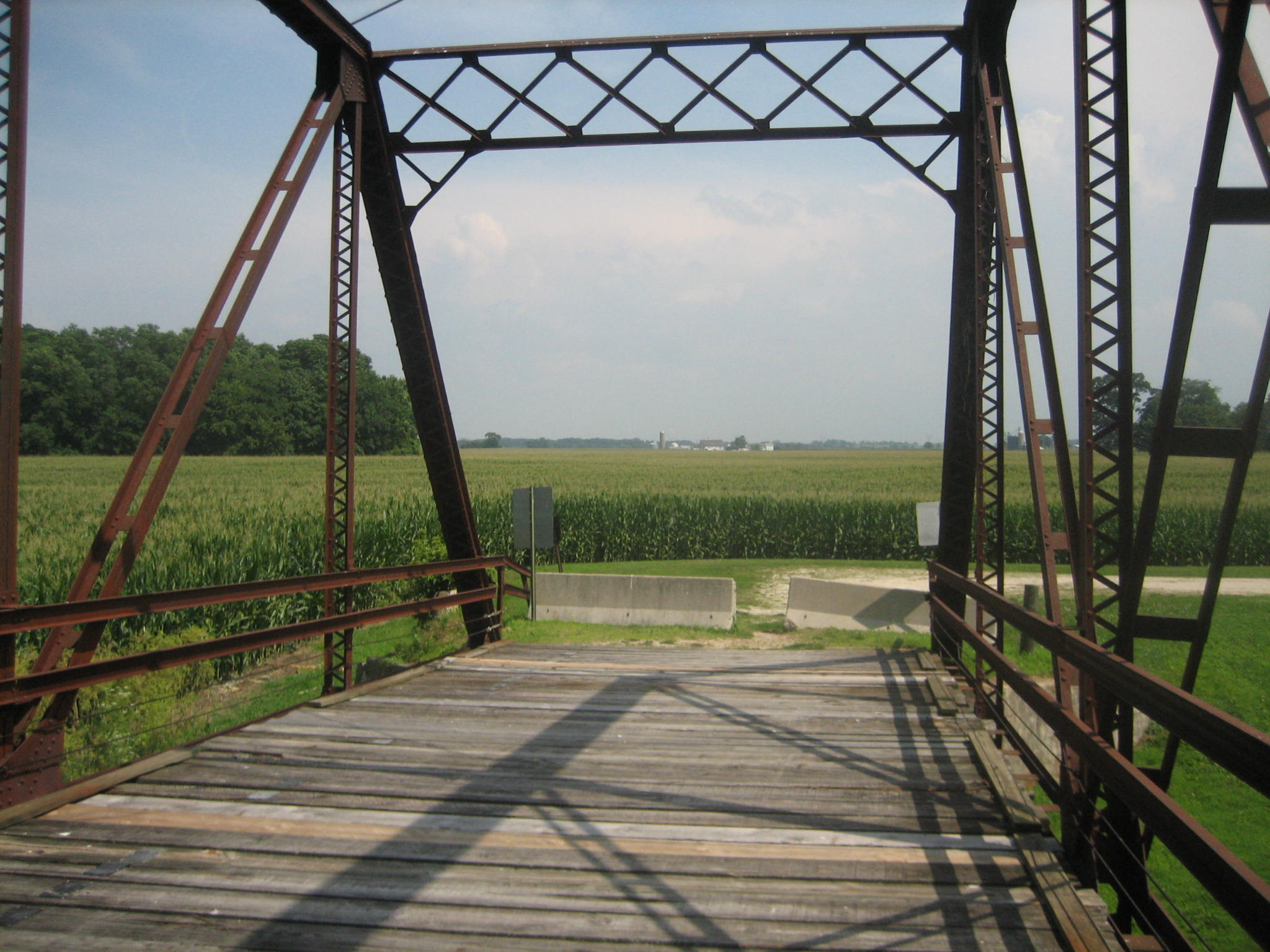
The bridge is no longer open to vehicle traffic and ends in a corn field.

The bridge was inspected regularly but it eventually fell into disuse. Truck loads increased and roads and methods of transport became more efficient and of better quality causing the bridge's importance to wane. Though the bridge was still a short cut to the farms south of Lyndon as well as to Prophetstown and Tampico the county could not maintain such a limited use bridge. On June 30, 1980 the county inspection resulted in the bridge being closed to all vehicular and pedestrian traffic. The bridge, which had a four-ton weight limit the eleven years preceding its closure, sat neglected for the next 15 years.

In 1995 the Whiteside County Highway Department decided to demolish Lyndon Bridge. A group of citizens in Lyndon then sought to save the bridge as part of Lyndon's history. The group led a successful "Save the Bridge" campaign and the Village of Lyndon received the title to the bridge in 1998. Whiteside County maps list the bridge as "abandoned".

== Design ==
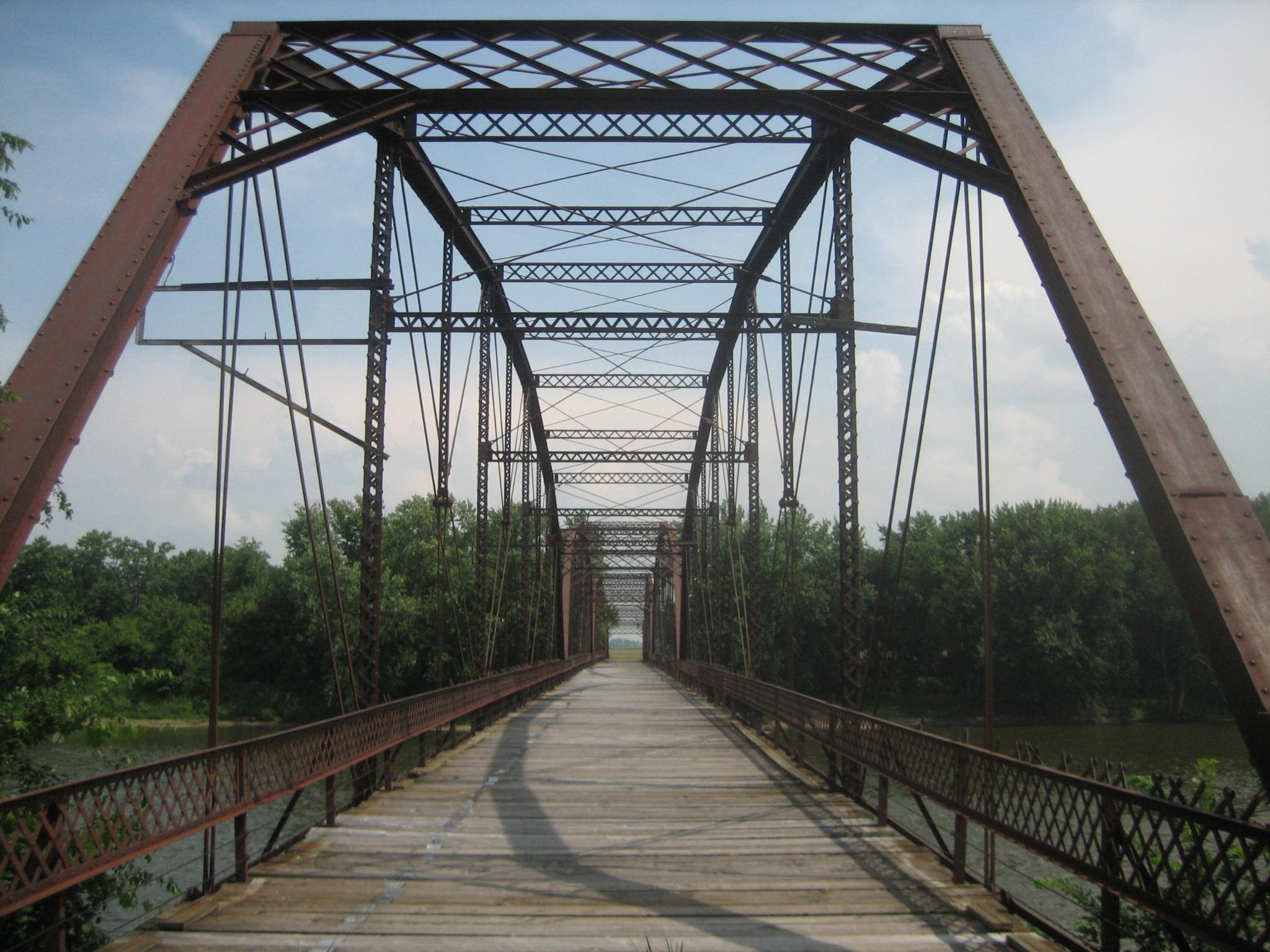
Lyndon Bridge was influential on the history of Lyndon by providing easier access to the village.

R.S. Riser's original design was a Parker Pratt bridge, as selected by the bridge committee. It consisted of three 200 foot (61 m) spans. Each span consisted of ten 20 foot (610 cm) long panels, where each panel met there were 15 inch (381 mm) I-beams between the trusses which held the stringers supporting the deck panels.

== Significance ==
The Lyndon Bridge was influential on Lyndon's history and development as it provided easier access to the town. The Lyndon Bridge is the last remaining metal through truss bridge in Whiteside County. The Illinois Historic Bridge Survey, which Lyndon Bridge was not a part of, identified 374 Illinois highway-related bridges that were eligible for listing on the U.S. National Register of Historic Places. Of those, only six were Parker through truss bridges from the period of the Lyndon Bridge's construction and early use, 1898-1917. Of the bridges surveyed in 1994, the Lyndon Bridge was most similar to the Division Street Bridge in Lockport, Illinois. The Division Street Bridge, no longer extant, crossed the Des Plaines River with two 200-foot (61 m) pin-connected Pratt through truss spans. The Lyndon Bridge later had its National Register eligibility determined by the Illinois Historic Preservation Agency despite being omitted from the 1994 survey. The bridge was added to the U.S. National Register of Historic Places on May 9, 2003.
