= Blakeman Bridge =

- U.S. National Register of Historic Places
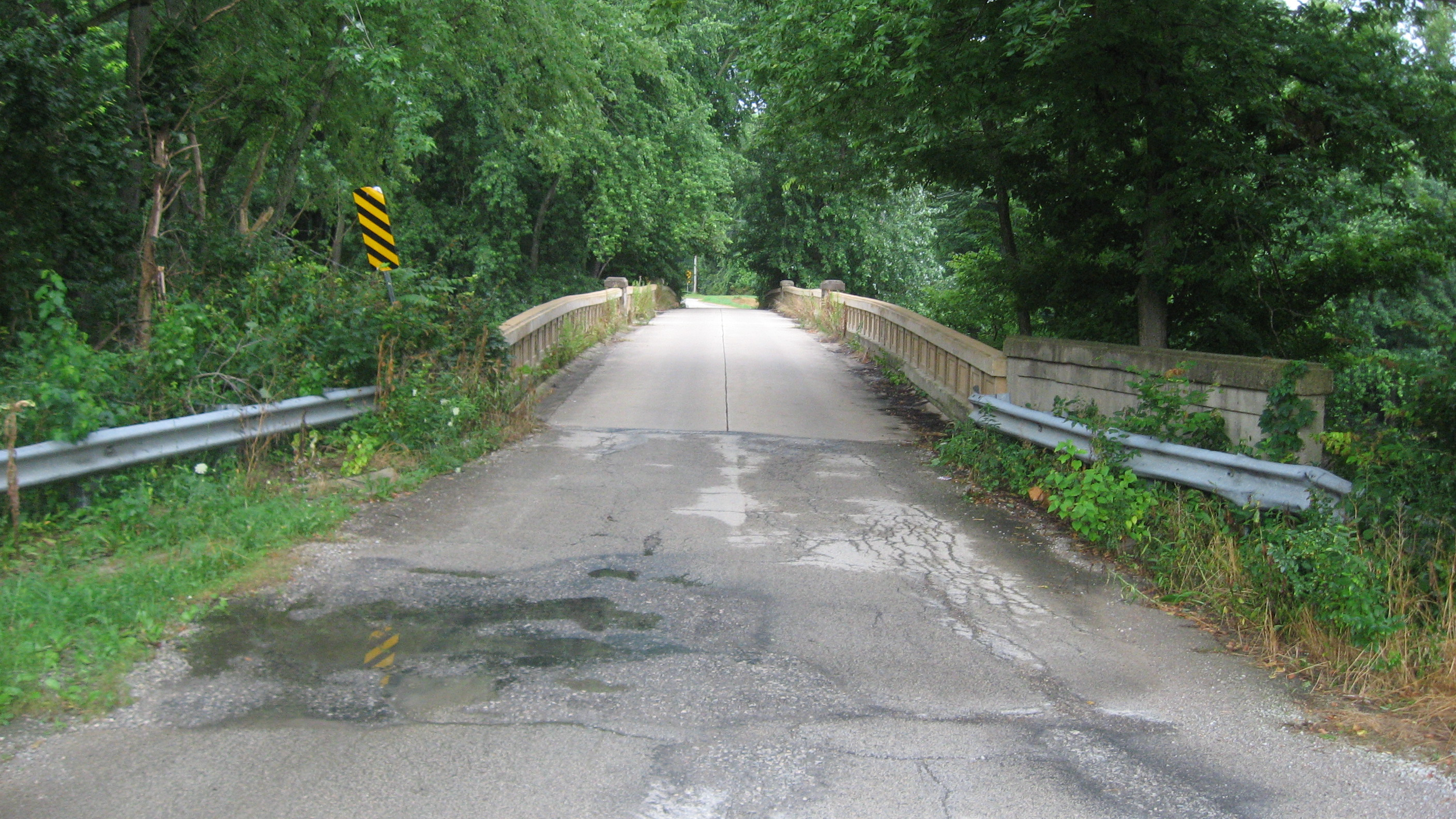

- Location within Illinois Location within the United States
- Nearest city: Charleston, Illinois
- Coordinates: 39°27′25″N 88°8′49″W
- Area: less than one acre
- Built: 1907
- Built by: Mercantile Bridge Co.
- Architectural style: triple arch, concrete
- MPS: Coles County Highway Bridges Over the Embarras River TR
- NRHP reference No.: 81000212
- Added to NRHP: November 30, 1981

Blakeman Bridge is an arch bridge which crosses the Embarras River in Coles County, Illinois. The concrete bridge is supported by three arches and is 257 feet (78 m) long. The Mercantile Bridge Company built the bridge in 1907. The bridge spanned the river at the site of the first mill and settlement in Coles County. As Illinois Route 130 crosses the river only 200 feet (61 m) upstream, the bridge was used as a detour for that route when its bridge was replaced.

The bridge was added to the National Register of Historic Places on November 30, 1981.
