= North Eighth Street Plaza =

- U.S. National Register of Historic Places
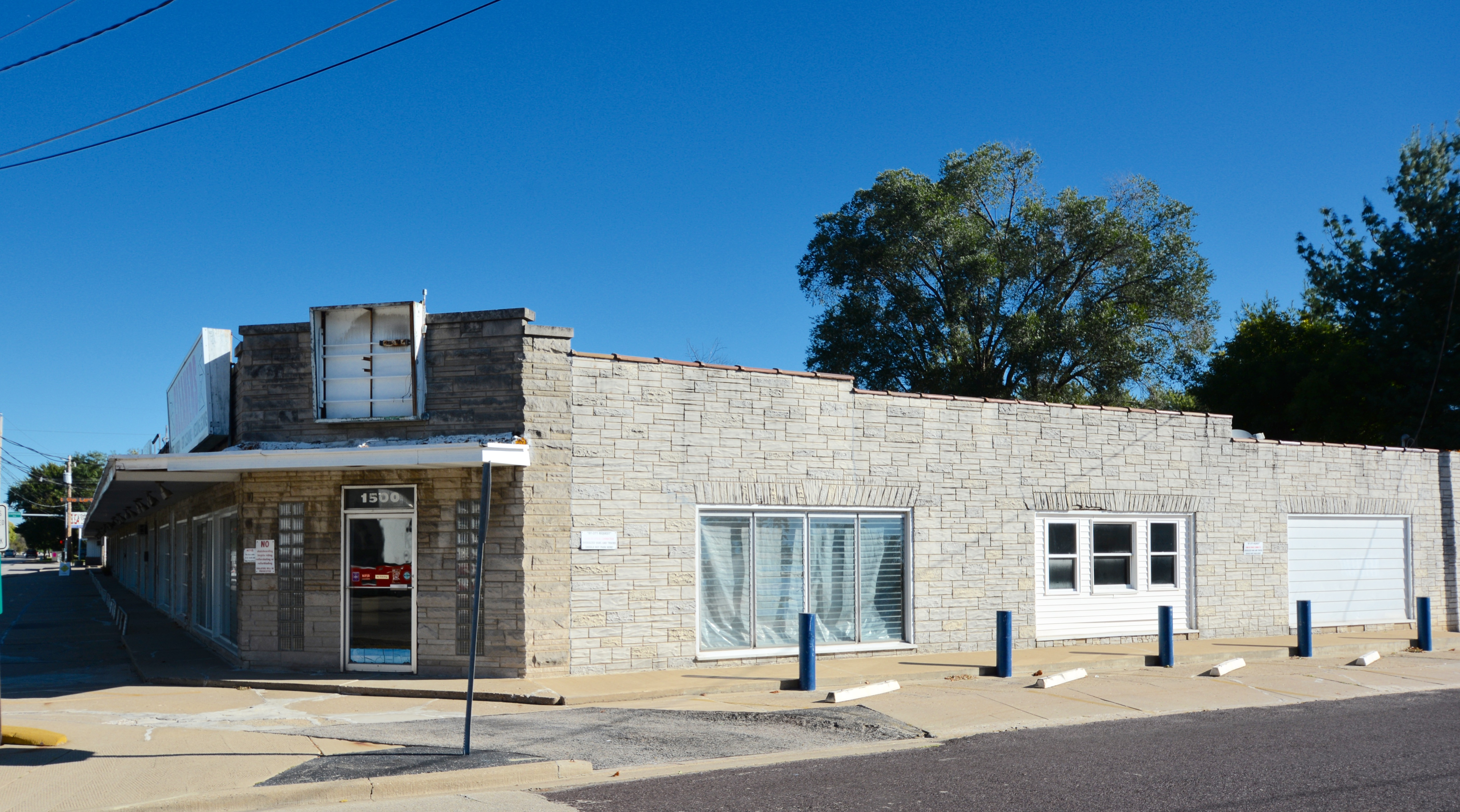

- Location within Illinois Location within the United States
- Location: 1500-1532 N. Eighth St., Pekin, Illinois
- Coordinates: 40°34′53″N 89°38′27″W
- Area: less than one acre
- Built: 1950
- NRHP reference No.: 15000226
- Added to NRHP: May 18, 2015

The North Eighth Street Plaza is a historic strip mall located at 1500-1532 North Eighth Street in Pekin, Illinois.

== Description and history ==
Orfeo Gianessi built the mall in 1950; at the time, its location was just outside the built-up area of Pekin. The mall was the first of its kind in the Pekin area and signified the onset of post-World War II car culture, as it was designed to draw in automobile traffic from Eighth Street rather than neighborhood foot traffic. It also predates any strip mall in the nearby larger city of Peoria and is one of the oldest strip malls in Illinois; the building type soon became quite common, and over 60,000 strip malls exist in the United States today. The building's design, a single-story straight row of joined storefronts, was typical of early strip malls and is still representative of the International Council of Shopping Centers' official classification of the strip mall.

The mall was added to the National Register of Historic Places on May 18, 2015.
