= Stone Quarry Bridge =

- U.S. National Register of Historic Places
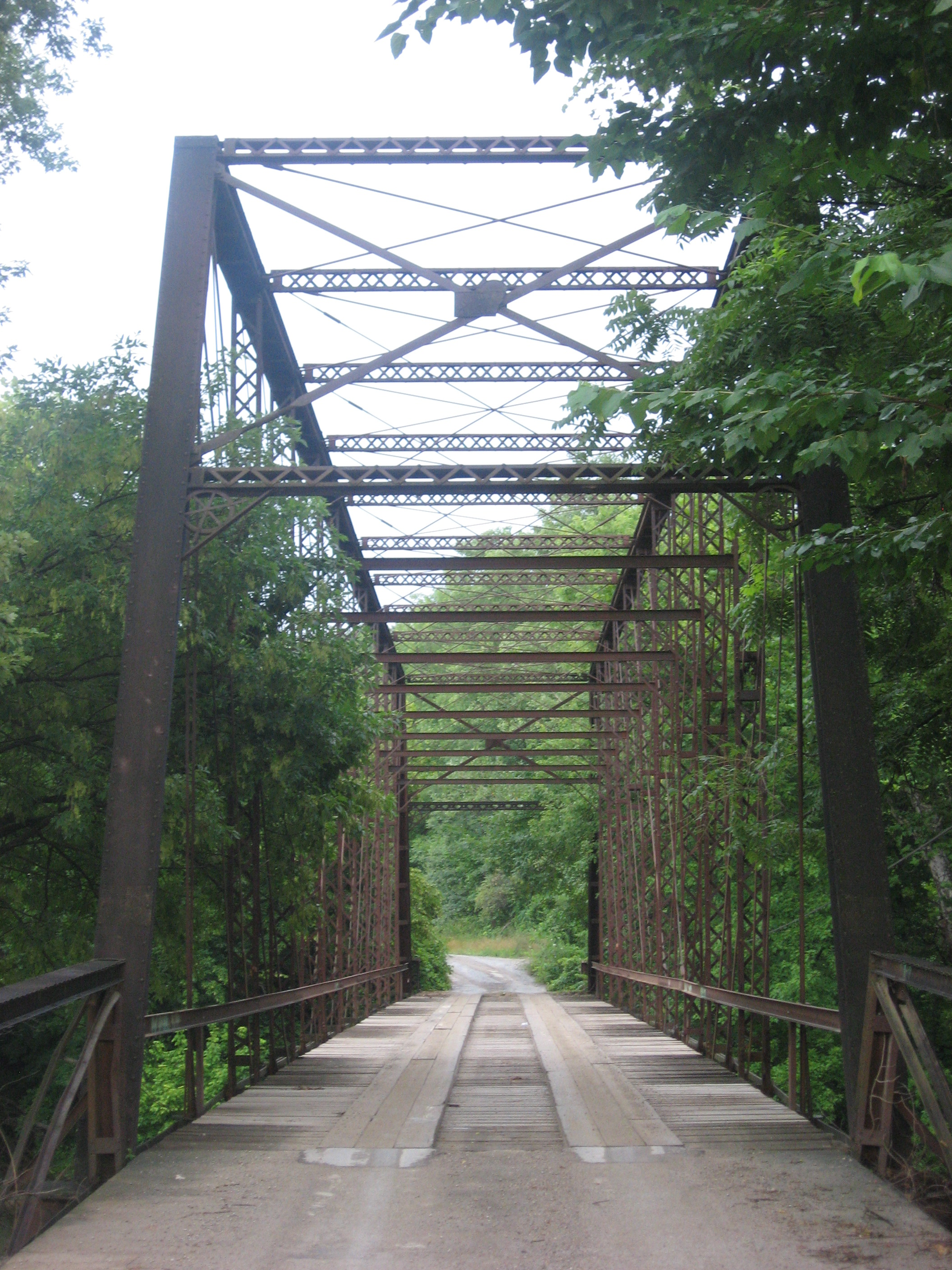

- Location within Illinois Location within the United States
- Nearest city: Charleston, Illinois
- Coordinates: 39°31′16″N 88°6′36″W
- Area: less than one acre
- Built: 1883
- Built by: King Iron Bridge Co.
- Architectural style: double intersection Pratt
- MPS: Coles County Highway Bridges Over the Embarras River TR
- NRHP reference No.: 81000215
- Added to NRHP: November 30, 1981

The Stone Quarry Bridge is a historic Pratt truss bridge which carries Township Road 1000N across the Embarras River in Coles County, Illinois, near Charleston, Illinois. The bridge is a double-intersection Pratt truss bridge, a variant of the Pratt truss in which the diagonal supports cross multiple panels; it is the only bridge of its type in the county. It is 180 feet (55 m) long, and its eastern and western portals are 14 feet 10 inches (4.52 m) and 16 feet (4.9 m) high respectively. Built in 1883 by the King Iron Bridge Company, the bridge is the oldest truss bridge in the county as well as the oldest bridge in the county which is still open to traffic.

It is named for its propinquity to the Charleston Stone Company quarry.

The bridge was added to the National Register of Historic Places on November 30, 1981.
