= Harrison Street Bridge =

- Harrison St. Bridge
- Formerly listed on the U.S. National Register of Historic Places
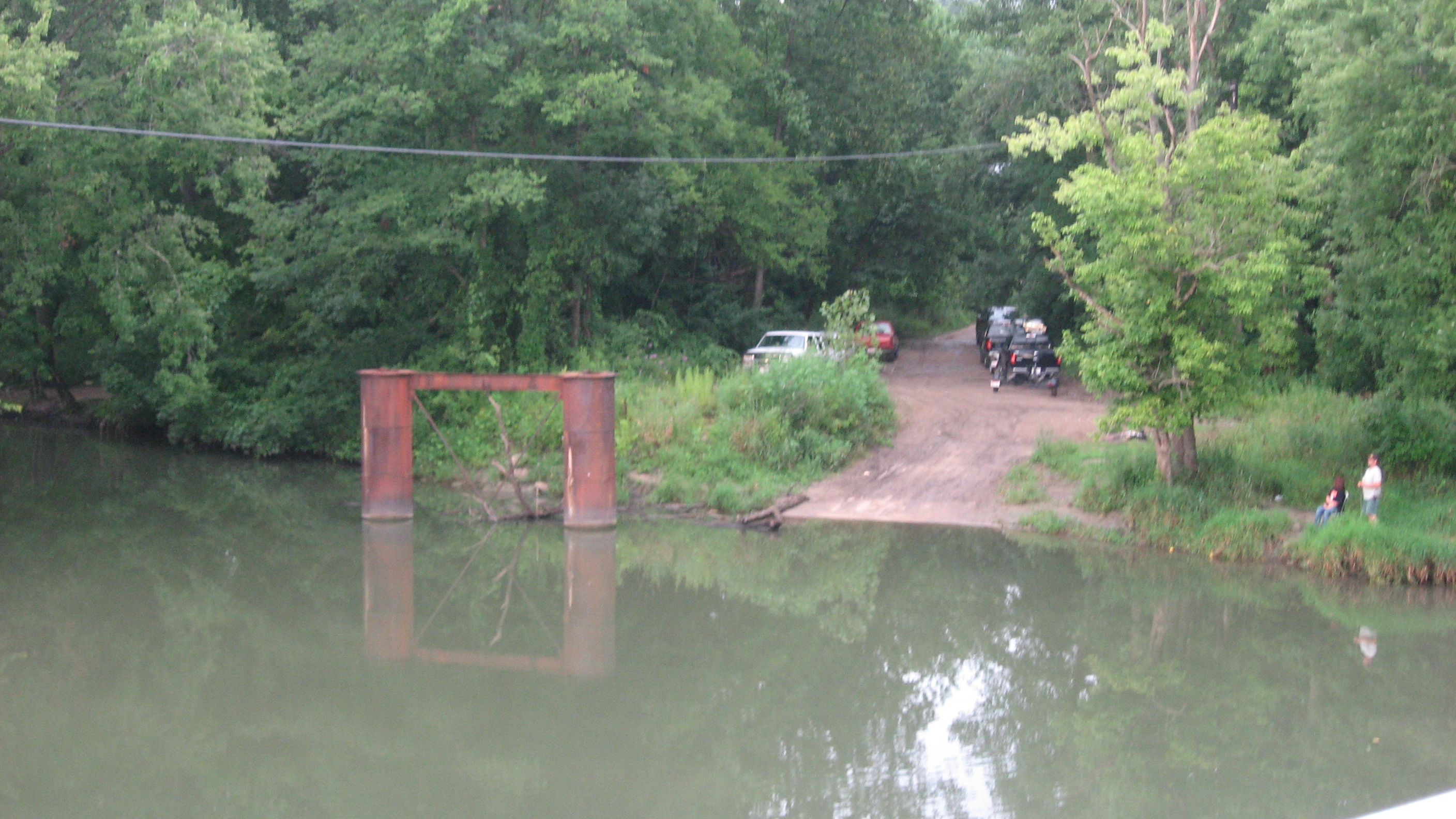
- The bridge site in 2013

- Location within Illinois Location within the United States
- Nearest city: Charleston, Illinois
- Coordinates: 39°29′21″N 88°6′48″W
- Area: less than one acre
- Built: 1898
- Built by: Oliver & Alexander
- Architectural style: Calmelback Parker truss
- MPS: Coles County Highway Bridges Over the Embarras River TR
- NRHP reference No.: 81000213

Significant dates
- Added to NRHP: November 30, 1981
- Removed from NRHP: January 6, 2020

The Harrison Street Bridge was a bridge which crossed the Embarras River east of Charleston, Illinois. The Camelback through truss bridge was 185 feet (56 m) long and 27.25 feet (8.31 m) tall at its highest point. Builders Oliver & Alexander constructed the bridge in 1898. The bridge was the only Camelback truss bridge ever built in Coles County.

The bridge was added to the National Register of Historic Places on November 30, 1981. At the time, the bridge was closed to vehicles and reported as being in poor condition. The bridge was demolished in 2011, and was delisted from the register in 2020.
