= Mackinaw station =

- Illinois Traction System Mackinaw Depot
- U.S. National Register of Historic Places
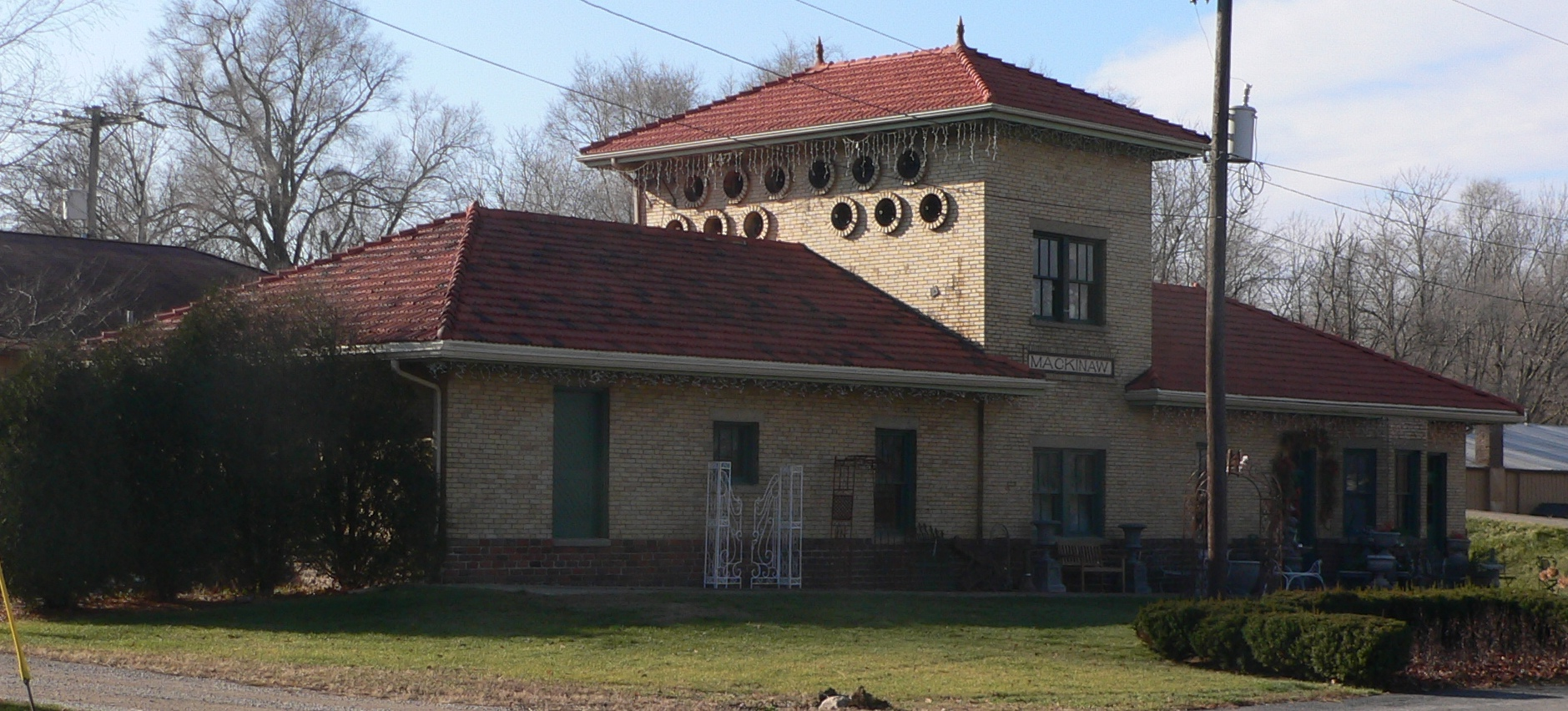

- Location within Illinois Location within the United States
- Location: N. Main St., Mackinaw, Illinois
- Coordinates: 40°32′21″N 89°21′35″W
- Area: less than one acre
- Built: 1909–10
- Built by: Illinois Traction System
- Architectural style: Spanish Colonial Revival
- NRHP reference No.: 78001192
- Added to NRHP: November 30, 1978

The Illinois Traction System Mackinaw Depot is a former in use 1909 to 1953 Illinois Terminal Railroad interurban passenger depot in Mackinaw, Illinois that still stands. The Illinois Terminal Railroad (from 1896 to 1937 known as the Illinois Traction System) ran an over head trolley wire powered railroad from Peoria on the north to St. Louis on the south with branches to Champaign and Urbana. The brick depot and rotary converter "substation" was built in 1909 and designed in the Spanish Colonial Revival style. The station served regularly scheduled electric interurban passenger trains and electric locomotive powered freight trains. The Illinois Power and Light Company also used the building as an electrical substation from 1927 until 1955. Very high voltage alternating current was converted to 600 volt direct current for use by the interurban line's locomotives and interurban cars. Wires entered and left through the large holes in the upper portions of the depot. The station was one of several properties owned by the IT at Mackinaw along with adjacent mainline track and a number of rail sidings, but the other buildings and the track have since been demolished leaving the depot as the only surviving landmark from the era of electric interurban trolley service in the central Illinois area.

The depot was added to the National Register of Historic Places on November 30, 1978.
