= Third Street Bridge (Delavan, Illinois) =

Historic railroad bridge in Illinois, United States

- Third St. Bridge
- U.S. National Register of Historic Places
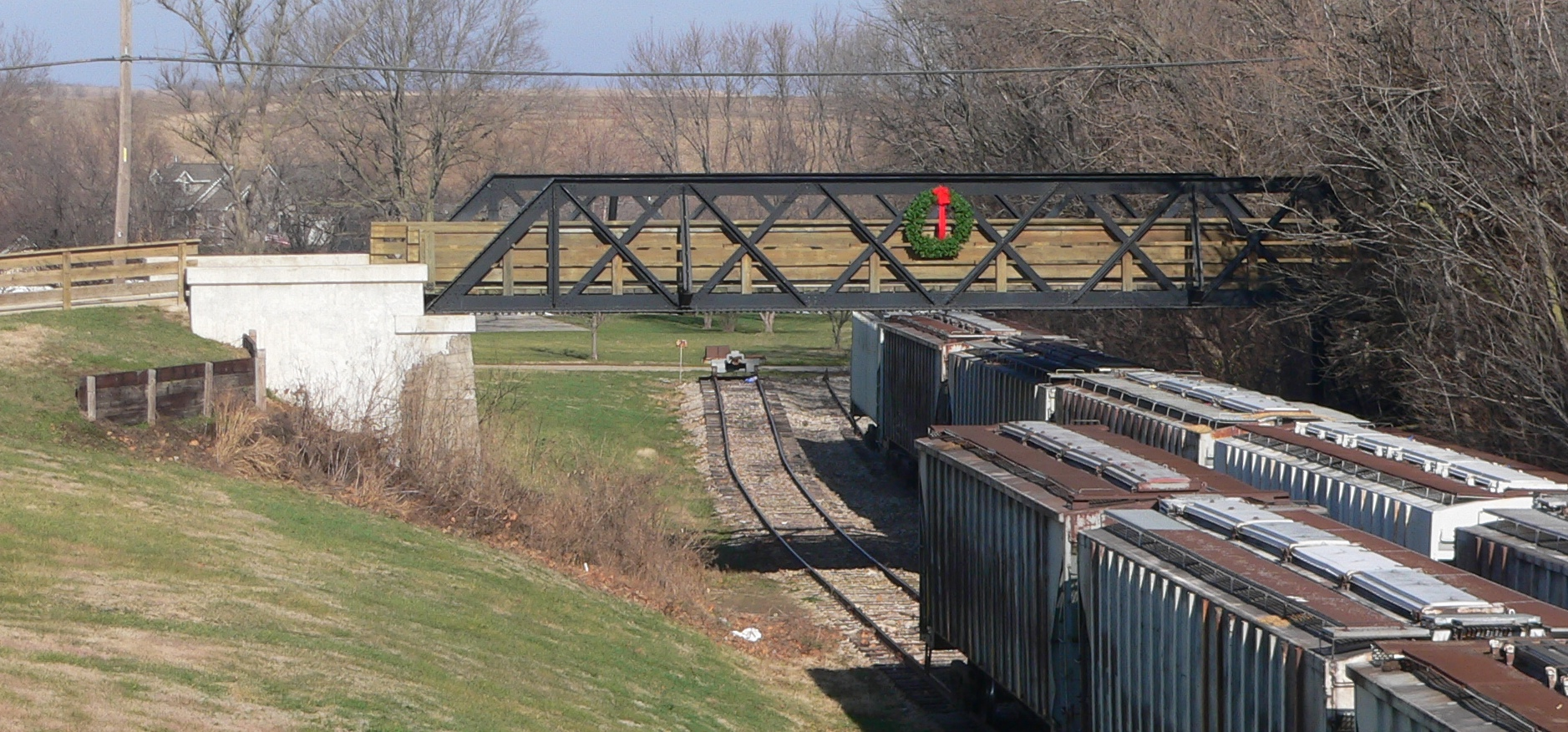

- Location within Illinois Location within the United States
- Location: Third St., bet. Pine and Elm Sts., Delavan, Illinois
- Coordinates: 40°22′25″N 89°32′41″W
- Area: less than one acre
- Built by: Kellogg Bridge Company
- Architectural style: Double intersectional Warren truss
- NRHP reference No.: 99000586
- Added to NRHP: May 20, 1999

The Third Street Bridge is a historic bridge which carries Third Street across a railroad between Pine and Elm Streets in Delavan, Illinois. The bridge was built by the Kellogg Bridge Company in the 1870s and originally served as a railroad bridge at an unknown site in Tennessee. The City of Delavan purchased the bridge in 1907 and brought it to its current site on Third Street. The bridge is a double intersectional Warren pony truss; it is one of two bridges of its type remaining in Illinois and the oldest metal truss bridge in the state. The Warren truss design consists of alternating equilateral triangles along the sides of the bridge; the bridge has two sets of overlapping Warren trusses on each side, making it double intersectional.

The bridge was added to the National Register of Historic Places on May 20, 1999.
