= Bridge at Thirteenth Street =

- Bridge at 13th Street
- U.S. National Register of Historic Places
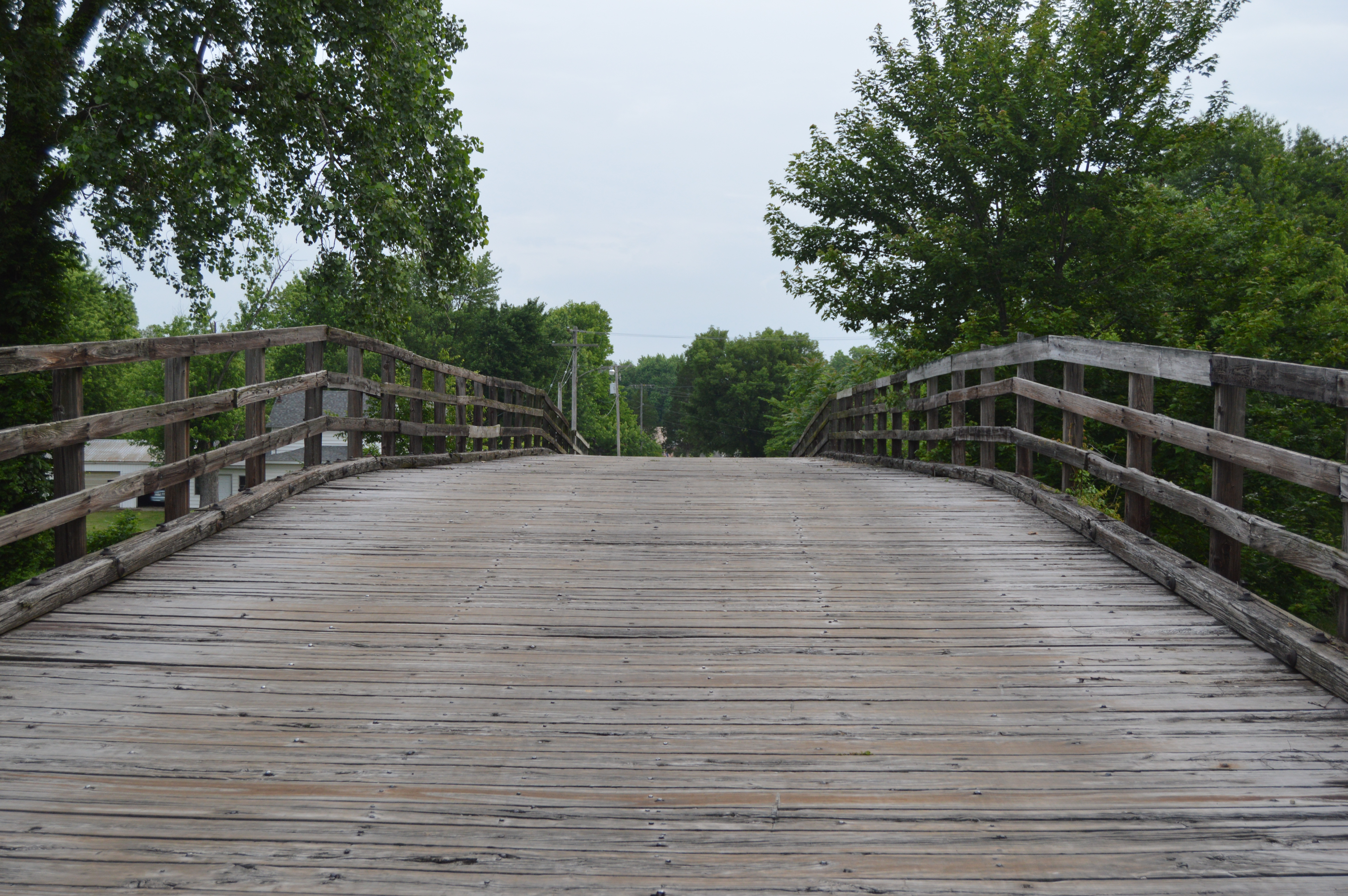
- Atop the bridge, looking south

- Location within Illinois Location within the United States
- Location: 13th St. between Clark and Johnson Sts., St. Francisville, Illinois
- Coordinates: 38°35′34″N 87°39′12″W
- Built: 1909
- NRHP reference No.: 16000198
- Added to NRHP: April 26, 2016

The Bridge at 13th Street, also known as the Wooden Bridge, is a historic bridge in St. Francisville, Illinois that carries 13th Street across a former railroad right-of way. The bridge was built in 1909 as a safer crossing of the railroad; at the time, the railroad was operated by the Cairo, Vincennes and Chicago Railway, a division of the Cleveland, Cincinnati, Chicago and St. Louis Railway (Big Four). The railroad paid for the bridge according to its contract with the city, which had passed a city council resolution compelling the railroad to fulfill this portion of the contract two years earlier. The bridge is a beam bridge built partly of timber and partly of steel, though it is possible that its steel beam was added after its completion. At 181 feet (55 m) long with a 54-foot (16 m) main span, the bridge is relatively long compared to other surviving timber bridges in Illinois.

The bridge was added to the National Register of Historic Places on April 26, 2016.
