= Tremont Township, Tazewell County, Illinois =

Coordinates: 40°31′16″N 89°25′51″W

Tremont Township
- Township
- Location in Tazewell County
- Country: United States
- State: Illinois
- County: Tazewell
- Established: November 6, 1849

Area
  - Total: 35.06 sq mi (90.8 km^{2})
  - Land: 34.96 sq mi (90.5 km^{2})
  - Water: 0.11 sq mi (0.28 km^{2}) 0.31%

Population (2010)
  - Estimate (2016): 2,563
  - Density: 75.6/sq mi (29.2/km^{2})
- Time zone: UTC-6 (CST)
  - Summer (DST): UTC-5 (CDT)
- FIPS code: 17-179-75978

Tremont Township is located in Tazewell County, Illinois, United States. As of the 2010 census, its population was 2,641 and it contained 1,043 housing units.

== History ==
Tremont gets its name from the Tri-Mounts, the three hills or mountains that border the village. One northeast, one slightly southeast, and one southwest. Hills form the area in which the city is located. Back when the country was a vast prairie, these hills were much more prominent since the cities were built. The first white settler near Tremont was a man named Chapman who came here in the early 1820s. He built a cabin near Grove in Pleasant Village, but shortly thereafter he moved to the town of Tremont, two and a half miles east. In 1826, Thomas Briggs and Hezekiah Davis came from Sangamon County and settled 2.5 miles northwest of Pleasant Grove as Native American merchants. They brought barrels of whiskey, calicos, blankets and other trinkets. Men's Wm. Davis, Nathan Dillon and Martin Miars were a few miles east of Tremont at about the same time. In 1830, James Stirling came to Tremont from Sangamon County and settled on a farm now owned by James Cottingham, two miles northeast of the village. Mr. Sterling was the first permanent white settler in his township of Tremont.

== Geography ==
According to the 2010 census, the township has a total area of 35.06 square miles (90.8 km^{2}), of which 34.96 square miles (90.5 km^{2}) (or 99.71%) is land and 0.11 square miles (0.28 km^{2}) (or 0.31%) is water.

== Demographics ==
Historical population
Census	Pop.	Note	%±
2016 (est.)	2,563
U.S. Decennial Census
