= Sixth, Seventh, and Tenth Street Stone Arch Bridges =

- U.S. National Register of Historic Places
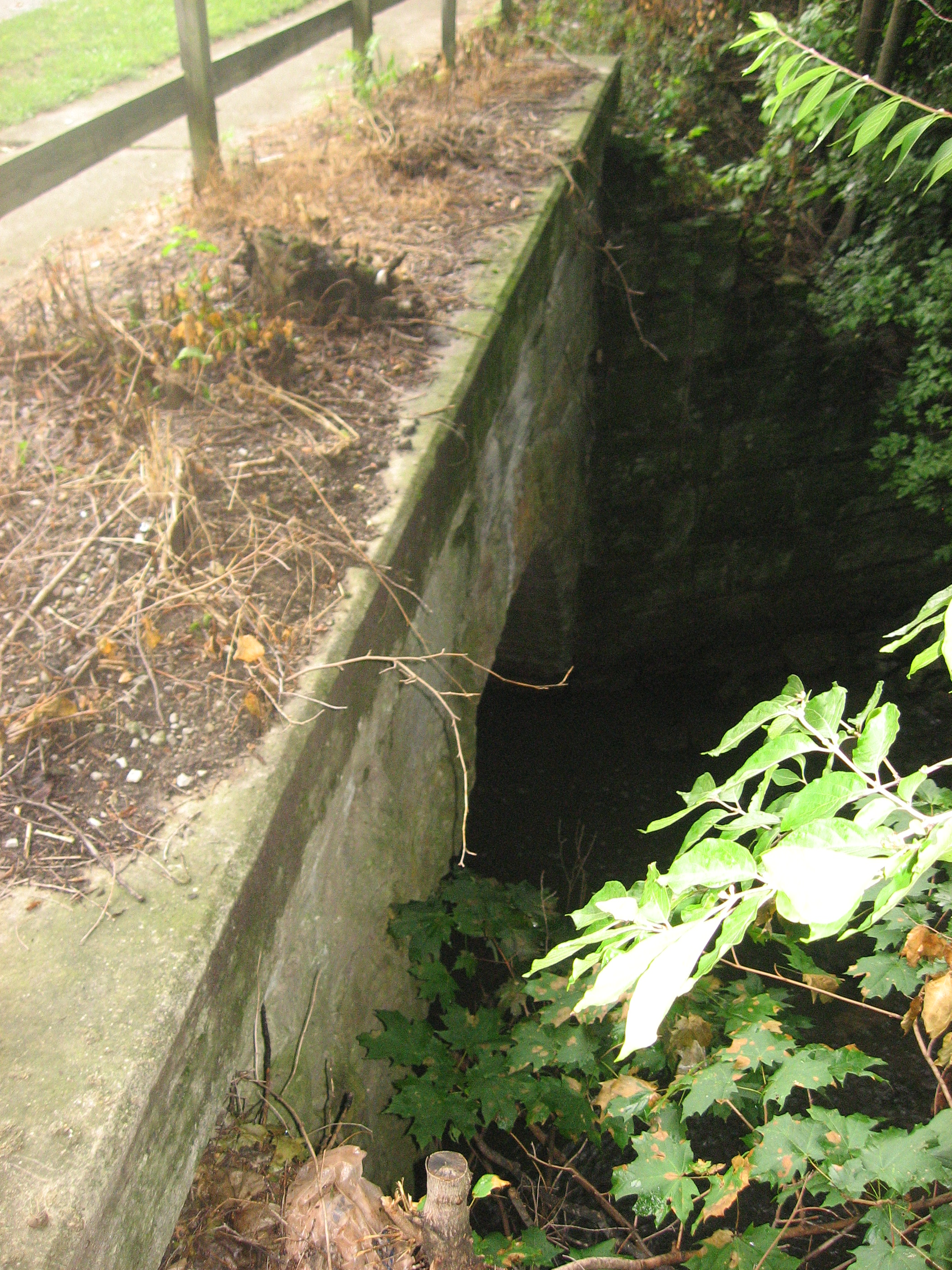
- The Sixth Street Stone Arch Bridge

- Location within Illinois Location within the United States
- Location: 700 blocks of Sixth, Seventh and Tenth Sts., Charleston, Illinois
- Coordinates: 39°29′33″N 88°10′27″W
- Area: less than one acre
- Built by: Briggs, Alexander
- Architectural style: Stone arch bridge
- NRHP reference No.: 01000869
- Added to NRHP: August 8, 2001

The Sixth, Seventh, and Tenth Street Stone Arch Bridges are three stone arch bridges in Charleston, Illinois, which carry Sixth, Seventh, and Tenth Streets across the Town Branch of Cassell Creek. Prominent local stonemason Alexander Briggs built the three bridges during the 1890s, when increasing development in Charleston expanded across the creek. The three bridges were all built from locally quarried limestone, and each has a single arch design with abutments at both ends. While Charleston has thirteen bridges across the Town Branch, these three are the only stone arch bridges in the city.

The bridges were added to the National Register of Historic Places on August 8, 2001.
