= Fall Creek Stone Arch Bridge =

- U.S. National Register of Historic Places
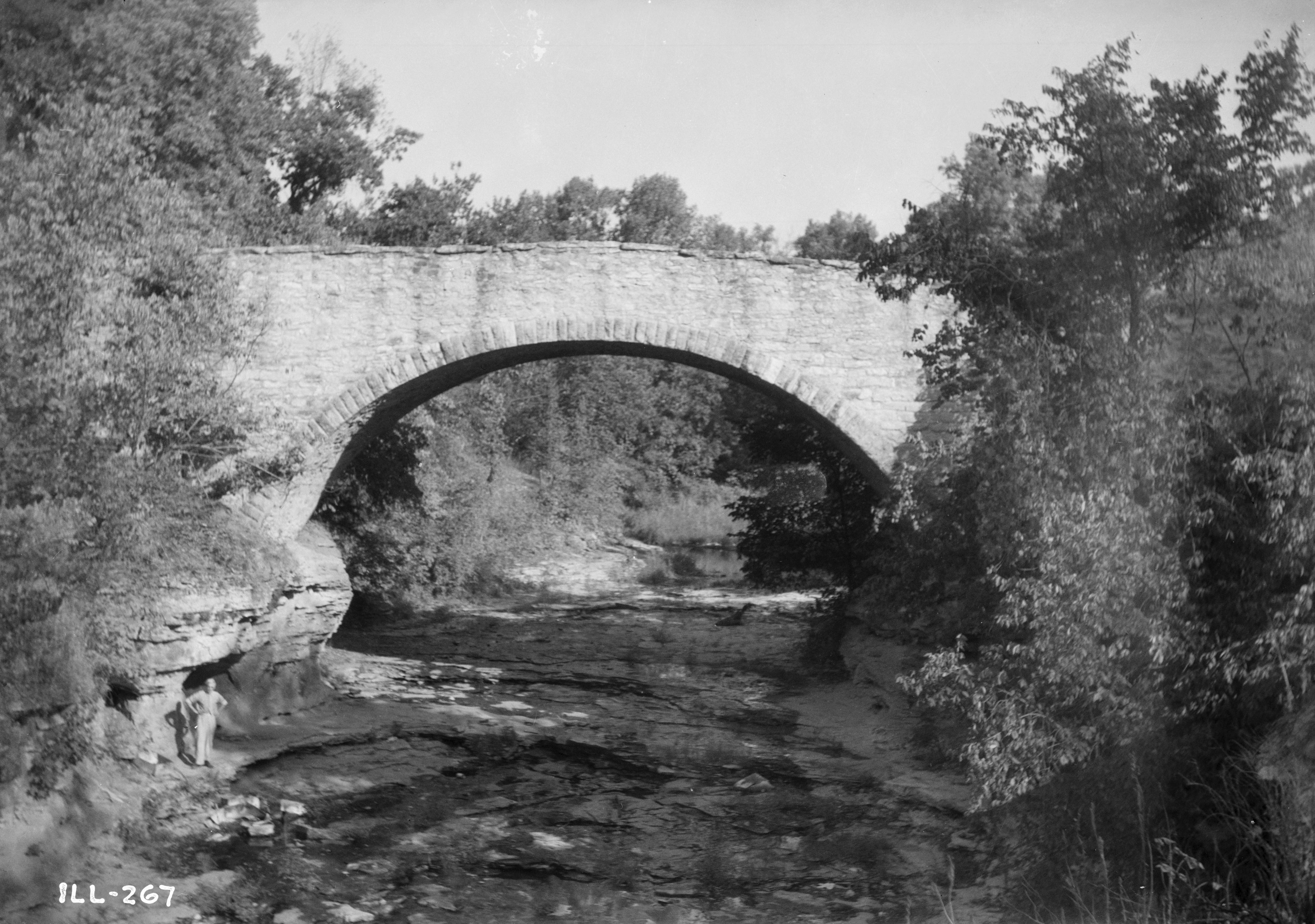
- The Stone Arch Bridge near Payson in 1936.

- Location within Illinois Location within the United States
- Nearest city: Payson, Illinois
- Coordinates: 39°47′28″N 91°17′30″W
- Area: less than one acre
- Built: 1855
- Built by: Elliot, Joseph; Mann, James
- Architectural style: stone arch bridge
- NRHP reference No.: 96001282
- Added to NRHP: November 7, 1996

Fall Creek Stone Arch Bridge is located near the Adams County town of Payson, Illinois. It spans Fall Creek about 1.2 miles northeast of Payson Road, upstream from the town. The bridge has been listed on the National Register of Historic Places since November 7, 1996.

== History ==
It is largely unknown when the bridge was built but estimates put it somewhere in the early 19th century. The bridge's engineers and designers are lost to history as well yet their bridge remains.

The Fall Creek Stone Arch Bridge spans Fall Creek in a near perfect arc, a distance of 43 feet at a height of 35 feet from the creek. The bridge is constructed from limestone, gathered nearby. The records of its construction were lost in an 1880s fire.
