= Edward C. Delavan =

Edward Cornelius Delavan (1793–1871) was a wealthy businessman who devoted much of his fortune to promoting the temperance movement. He helped establish the American Temperance Union; attacked the use of wine in Christian communion; established a temperance hotel in Albany, New York; traveled to Europe to promote teetotalism. He helped spearhead the local option movement in New York during the 1840s by which local majorities could vote their towns dry. In 1846, he received the nomination for the Governorship of New York from the Native American Party, but he declined it. He was also active in the Maine Law prohibition movement of the 1850s. He later sent a copy of a temperance tract to every soldier in the Union Army during the Civil War (a million copies in all); and sponsored a series of periodicals. They included the Journal of the American Temperance Union, the Temperance Recorder, the American Temperance Intelligencer; the Enquirer, and the Prohibitionist. Prohibition or dry towns in Illinois and Wisconsin were named in his honor.

E. C. Delavan is the namesake of Delavan, Illinois and Delavan, Wisconsin.
