= Allentown Union Hall =

- U.S. National Register of Historic Places
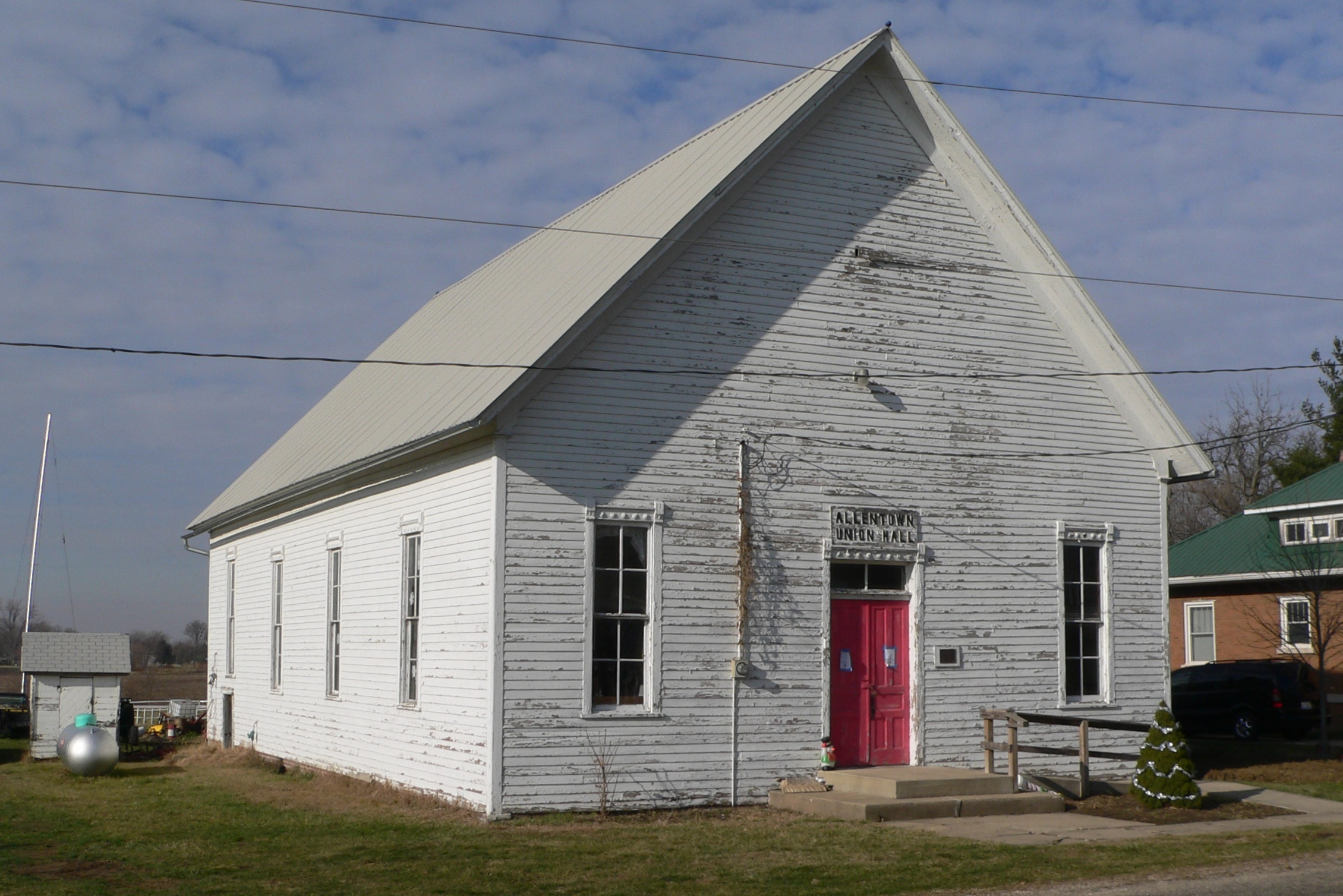

- Location within Illinois Location within the United States
- Location: 2 mi. E of IL 121, Allentown, Illinois
- Coordinates: 40°33′19″N 89°23′50″W
- Area: 0.1 acres (0.040 ha)
- Built: 1892
- Built by: John Will White
- NRHP reference No.: 88001228
- Added to NRHP: August 12, 1988

The Allentown Union Hall is a historic meeting hall located 2 miles (3.2 km) east of Illinois Route 121 in Allentown, Illinois. The building was built in 1892 to host community events in Allentown, a small rural settlement. Like many small communities nationwide at the turn of the century, the citizens of Allentown wished to expand their educational and cultural horizons; since rough dirt roads made travel outside the community difficult, the community used the hall to host its own cultural events. The Allentown Helping Hand Circle, the community organization that raised the money for the building, hosted many of the hall's early events, which included community dinners and talent shows. The hall also hosted shows put on both by actors and musicians from Allentown and the surrounding area and by traveling acts who stopped in the community. As the only large public building in the area, the town hall also served as a polling place, a clubhouse for women's clubs and fraternal organizations, a church for the community's religious groups, and an auditorium for the local school.

The building was added to the National Register of Historic Places on August 12, 1988.
