= Waltmire Bridge =

- U.S. National Register of Historic Places
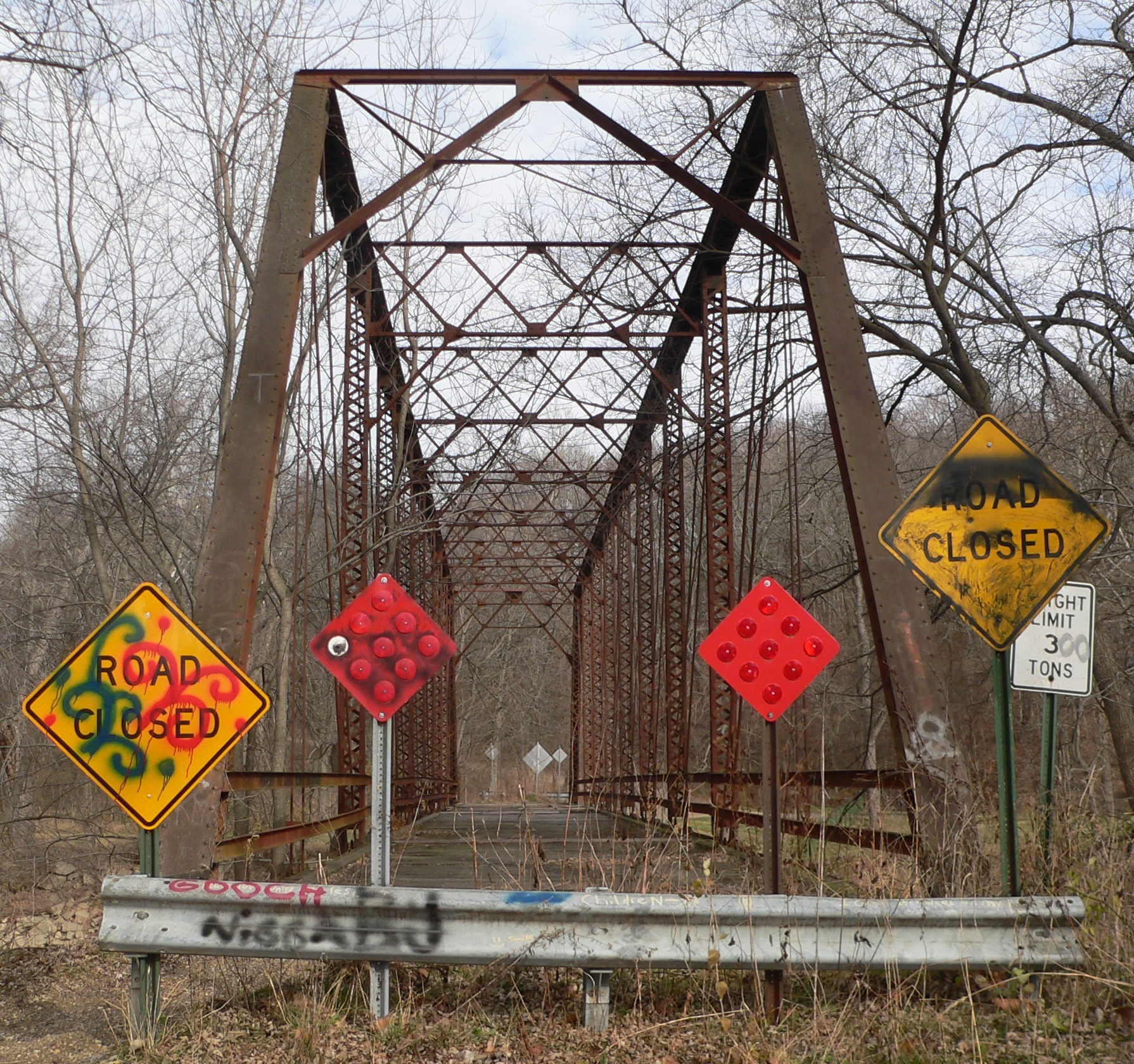

- Location within Illinois Location within the United States
- Nearest city: Tremont, Illinois
- Coordinates: 40°26′57″N 89°29′31″W
- Area: less than one acre
- Built: 1910
- Architect: Cooney, Edward
- Architectural style: Pratt Through Truss
- NRHP reference No.: 99000112
- Added to NRHP: February 5, 1999

The Waltmire Bridge is a historic bridge which carried Locust Road across the Mackinaw River 4.9 miles (7.9 km) south of Tremont, Illinois. The bridge was built in 1910 by contractor Edward Cooney at the site of Waltmire's Ford, a shallow point in the river that could only be easily crossed when water levels were low. Both the ford and the bridge were named for local farmer John Waltmire. The bridge has a steel Pratt through truss design, which consists of vertical compression supports and diagonal tension supports. The Pratt truss was a common bridge type in the late nineteenth and early twentieth centuries; the Waltmire Bridge is a relatively long example of the type at 187 feet 6 inches (57.15 m). The bridge, which is now closed to traffic, is one of two surviving metal truss bridges across the Mackinaw River.

The bridge was added to the National Register of Historic Places on February 5, 1999.
