= Cemetery Road Bridge =

Historic site in Glendale Cemetery, Tazewell County, Illinois

- U.S. National Register of Historic Places
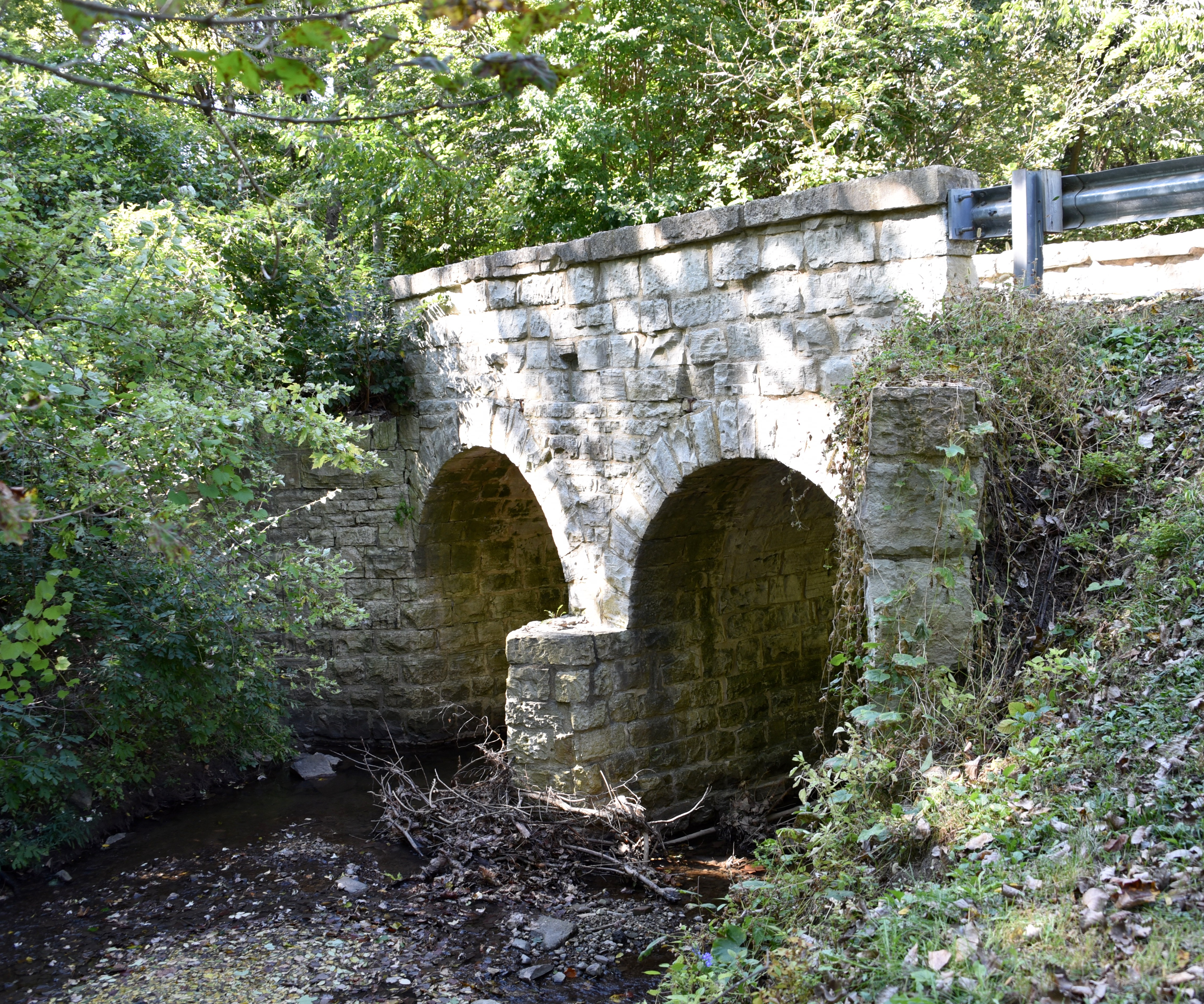

- Location within Illinois Location within the United States
- Location: Candlewood Dr. within Glendale Cemetery, Washington, Illinois
- Coordinates: 40°41′51″N 89°24′41″W
- Area: less than one acre
- Built: 1894
- Built by: Habluetzel, Jacob
- Architect: Rickman, Frederick
- Architectural style: Stone double arch bridge
- NRHP reference No.: 98000467
- Added to NRHP: May 20, 1998

Cemetery Road Bridge is a historic bridge located in Glendale Cemetery in Washington, Illinois. The double stone arch bridge is 27 feet (8.2 m) long and carries Cemetery Road across the south branch of Farm Creek. Engineer Frederick Rickman designed the bridge for the City of Washington in 1893, and it was built the following year by stonemason Jacob Habluetzel. Habluetzel built the bridge from square cut blocks of ashlar stone. The bridge is the best-preserved bridge of its type in Tazewell County and is the only stone arch bridge in the area that is still supported solely by its arches.

The bridge was added to the National Register of Historic Places on May 20, 1998.
