= Bolivia, Illinois =

- Unincorporated community
- Location within Illinois Location within the United States
- Coordinates: 39°44′32″N 89°20′49″W
- Country: United States
- State: Illinois
- County: Christian
- Elevation: 607 ft (185 m)
- Time zone: UTC-6 (Central (CST))
  - Summer (DST): UTC-5 (CDT)
- Area code: 217
- GNIS feature ID: 404665

Bolivia is an unincorporated community in Christian County, Illinois, United States. It lies at 39°44′32″N 89°20′49″W.
