= Delavan, Illinois =

City in Tazewell County, Illinois, United States

Delavan
- City
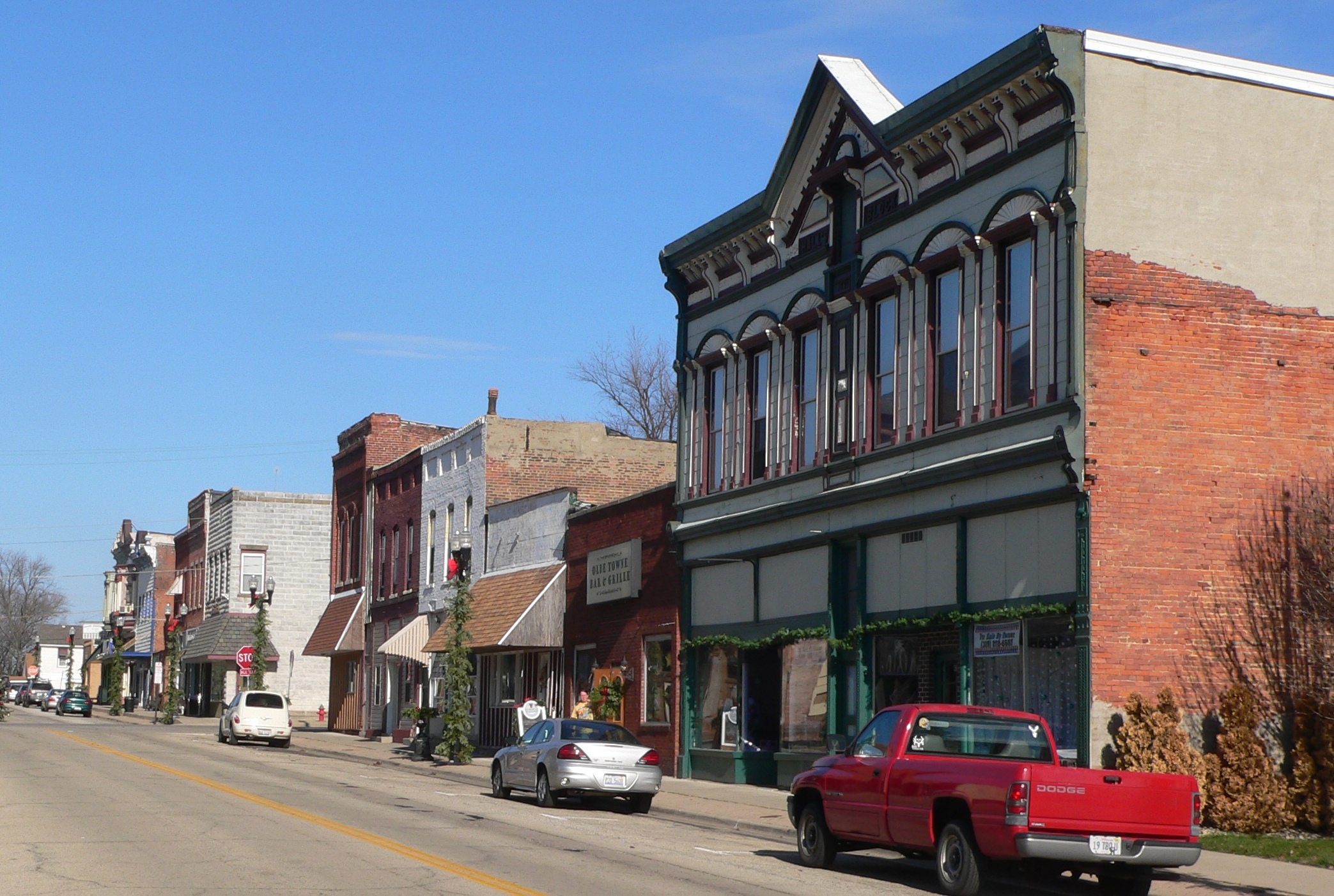
- Downtown Delavan

- Location of Delavan in Tazewell County, Illinois.

- Location of Delavan, Illinois Delavan (Illinois)
- Coordinates: 40°22′16″N 89°32′46″W
- Country: United States
- State: Illinois
- County: Tazewell
- settled: 1837

Area
  - Total: 1.44 sq mi (3.74 km^{2})
  - Land: 1.44 sq mi (3.74 km^{2})
  - Water: 0 sq mi (0.00 km^{2})
- Elevation: 604 ft (184 m)

Population (2020)
  - Total: 1,568
  - Density: 1,087.1/sq mi (419.75/km^{2})
- Time zone: UTC-6 (CST)
  - Summer (DST): UTC-5 (CDT)
- Postal code: 61734
- Area code: 309
- FIPS code: 17-19226
- GNIS feature ID: 2394496
- Website: www.delavanil.org

Delavan is a city in Tazewell County, Illinois, United States. As of the 2020 census, Delavan had a population of 1,568. It is a part of the Peoria, Illinois Metropolitan Statistical Area.

== History ==
Delavan was founded by a group of settlers from Rhode Island. The city derives its name from Edward C. Delavan, a temperance advocate from Albany, New York. A post office has been in operation at Delavan since 1840.

== Geography ==
According to the 2010 census, Delavan has a total area of 0.71 square miles (1.84 km^{2}), all land.

== Demographics ==
Historical population
Census	Pop.	Note	%±
1880	1,340		—
1890	1,176		−12.2%
1900	1,304		10.9%
1910	1,175		−9.9%
1920	1,191		1.4%
1930	1,084		−9.0%
1940	1,181		8.9%
1950	1,248		5.7%
1960	1,377		10.3%
1970	1,844		33.9%
1980	1,973		7.0%
1990	1,642		−16.8%
2000	1,825		11.1%
2010	1,689		−7.5%
2020	1,568		−7.2%
U.S. Decennial Census

=== 2020 census ===
As of the 2020 census, Delavan had a population of 1,568. The median age was 41.3 years. 25.2% of residents were under the age of 18 and 20.4% of residents were 65 years of age or older. For every 100 females there were 93.1 males, and for every 100 females age 18 and over there were 88.3 males age 18 and over.

0.0% of residents lived in urban areas, while 100.0% lived in rural areas.

There were 654 households in Delavan, of which 31.2% had children under the age of 18 living in them. Of all households, 46.5% were married-couple households, 16.8% were households with a male householder and no spouse or partner present, and 28.1% were households with a female householder and no spouse or partner present. About 31.1% of all households were made up of individuals and 16.2% had someone living alone who was 65 years of age or older.

There were 728 housing units, of which 10.2% were vacant. The homeowner vacancy rate was 1.0% and the rental vacancy rate was 9.0%.

Racial composition as of the 2020 census
Race	Number	Percent
White	1,445	92.2%
Black or African American	19	1.2%
American Indian and Alaska Native	1	0.1%
Asian	4	0.3%
Native Hawaiian and Other Pacific Islander	1	0.1%
Some other race	15	1.0%
Two or more races	83	5.3%
Hispanic or Latino (of any race)	28	1.8%

=== 2000 census ===
As of the census of 2000, there were 1,825 people, 705 households, and 516 families residing in the city. The population density was 2,567.4 inhabitants per square mile (991.3/km^{2}). There were 744 housing units at an average density of 1,046.6 per square mile (404.1/km^{2}). The racial makeup of the city was 98.36% White, 0.44% African American, 0.16% Asian, 0.16% from other races, and 0.88% from two or more races. Hispanic or Latino of any race were 0.44% of the population. There were no Pacific Islanders or Native Americans.

There were 705 households, out of which 31.9% had children under the age of 18 living with them, 63.5% were married couples living together, 6.8% had a female householder with no husband present, and 26.7% were non-families. 24.7% of all households were made up of individuals, and 13.2% had someone living alone who was 65 years of age or older. The average household size was 2.59 and the average family size was 3.06.

In the city, the population was spread out, with 27% under the age of 18, 7.7% from 18 to 24, 27.2% from 25 to 44, 22.7% from 45 to 64, and 15.4% who were 65 years of age or older. The median age was 38 years. For every 100 females, there were 93.9 males. For every 100 females age 18 and over, there were 93.6 males.

The median income for a household in the city was $39,063, and the median income for a family was $46,250. Males had a median income of $36,685 versus $21,435 for females. The per capita income for the city was $18,734. 5.7% of the population and 4.2% of families were below the poverty line. 5% of those under the age of 18 and 7.5% of those 65 and older were living below the poverty line.

== Education ==
Delavan has a consolidated public schools district (#703) which educates pre-school through high school students in different areas of a common campus environment.

== Notable people ==
- Harriet Creighton (1909–2004), botanist
- John T. Culbertson, Jr., Illinois Supreme Court justice
- Johnny McDowell, racing driver
- Archibald H. Sunderland, U.S. Army major general
- Julia Thecla, artist
