= 1953–54 Michigan State Normal Hurons men's basketball team =

American college basketball season

1953–54 Eastern Michigan Eagles men's basketball

IIAC All-Sports Trophy winners
- Conference: Interstate Intercollegiate Athletic Conference
- Record: 8–12 (4–8 IIAC)
- Head coach: Robert Holloway (1st season)
- Assistant coach: K. Seng
- Home arena: Bowen Field House

The 1953–54 Michigan State Normal Hurons men's basketball team represented Eastern Michigan University, in the 1953–54 NCAA University Division men's basketball season. The team finished with a record of 8–12 and 4–8 in the Interstate Intercollegiate Athletic Conference. Despite their losing record the team ended up winning the IIAC All-Sports Trophy winners. The team was led by first year head coach Robert Holloway. Web Kirksey was the team captain.

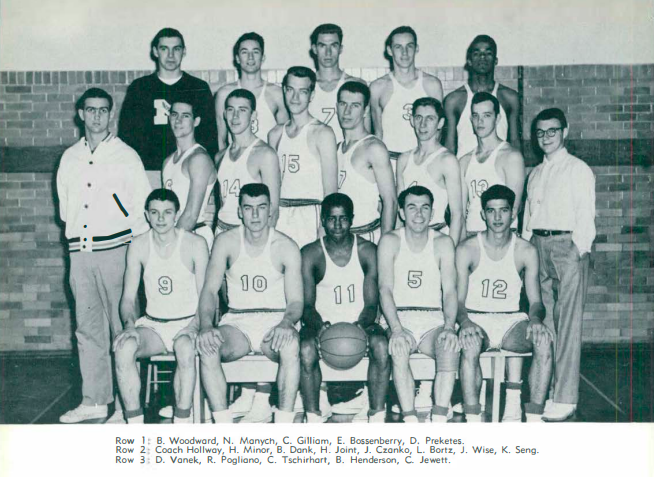
1953-54 EMU Basketball Team Picture

== Roster ==
Number	Name	Class	Hometown
3	B. Henderson		
4	L. Bortz		
5	E. Bossenberry		
6	H. Minor		
7	Carl Tshirhart	Senior	Milan, MI
9	Bob Woodward		
10	Nick Manych		
11	Cleon Gilliam		
12	D. Preketes		
13	J. Wise		
14	Robert Dank		
15	H. Joint		
	J. Czanko		
	L. Bortz		
	R. Pogliano		
	C. Jewett		
	W. Kirksey		Saginaw, MI

== Schedule ==
Date time, TV	Opponent	Result	Record	Site (attendance) city, state
Non-conference regular season
December 3, 1953*	Western Ontario	W 74–46	1–0	Gymnasium; Ypsilanti, MI
December 5, 1953*	at Hillsdale	W 71–55	2–0	Stock Field House; Hillsdale, MI
December 9, 1953*	Hope	L 65-74	2–1	Gymnasium; Ypsilanti, MI
December 15, 1955*	at Wayne State	L 54-73	2–2	Pershing H.S. Detroit, MI
December 19, 1953	at Illinois State	L 63-89	2–3 (0-1)	McCormick Gymnasium; Normal, IL
December 21, 1953	Western Illinois	L 62-89	2–4 (0-2)	Macomb, IL
January 8, 1954*	at Western Ontario	L 72-75 ^{OT}	2–5	Alumni Hall; London, Ontario
January 11, 1954	Northern Illinois	L 62-64	2–6 (0-3)	Gymnasium; Ypsilanti, MI
January 16, 1954	Central Michigan	L 51-61	2–7 (0-4)	Gymnasium; Ypsilanti, MI
January 19, 1954*	at Hope	W 93-68	3–7	Holland, MI
January 23, 1954*	Hillsdale	W 74-40	4–7	Gymnasium; Ypsilanti, MI
January 30, 1954	at Eastern Illinois	L 54-86	4–8 (0–5)	Health Education Building; Charleston, IL
February 1, 1954	at Southern Illinois	L 66-72	4–9 (0–6)	Davies Gym; Carbondale, IL
February 6, 1954	Illinois State	W 74-64	5–9 (1–6)	Gymnasium; Ypsilanti, MI
February 8, 1954	Western Illinois	L 74-75	6–10 (1–7)	Gymnasium; Ypsilanti, MI
February 13, 1954	at Central Michigan	W 64-58	6–10 (2–7)	Finch Fieldhouse; Mount Pleasant, MI
February 18, 1954*	Wayne State	L 54-60	6–11	Gymnasium; Ypsilanti, MI
February 22, 1954	at Northern Illinois	W 83-66	7–11 (3–7)	DeKalb, IL
February 27, 1954	Eastern Illinois	L 76-88	7–12 (3–8)	Gymnasium; Ypsilanti, MI
March 1, 1954	Southern Illinois	W 86-72	8–12 (4–8)	Gymnasium; Ypsilanti, MI
*Non-conference game. (#) Tournament seedings in parentheses. All times are in Eastern Time.
