= Commerce Bank Building (Peoria, Illinois) =

Skyscraper in Peoria

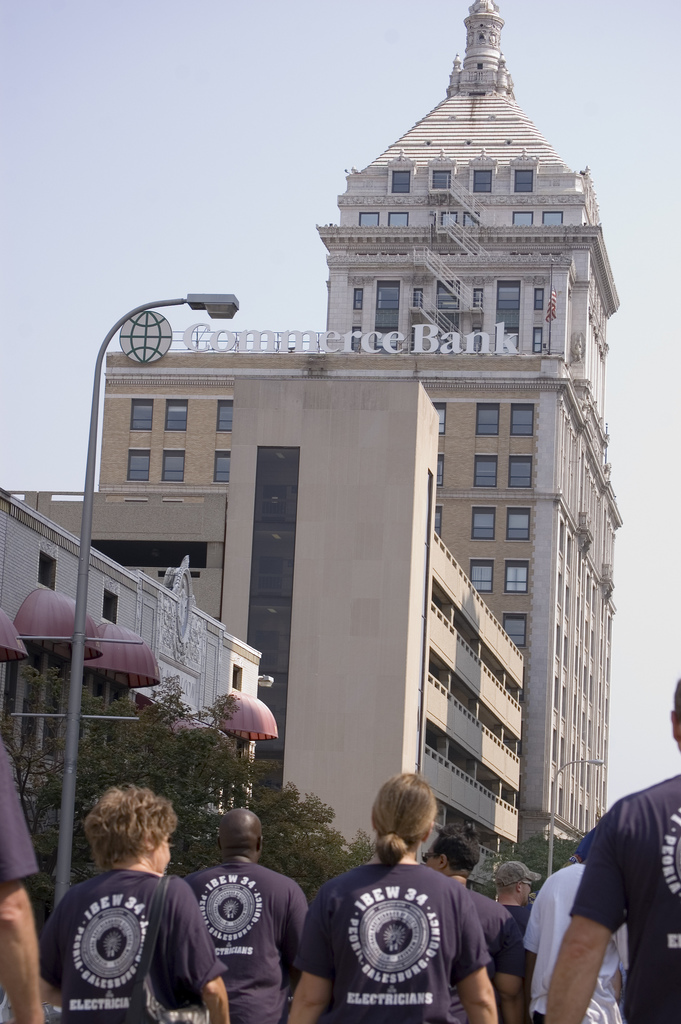
- Commerce Bank Building, Labor Day Parade 2008, IBEW, Peoria The Commerce Bank Building in 2008 during a Labor Day parade.

- Location within Illinois Location within the United States

General information
- Status: Completed
- Type: Office
- Architectural style: Neoclassical
- Location: 416 Main Street, Peoria, Illinois, United States
- Coordinates: 40°41′35″N 89°35′26″W
- Completed: 1920

Height
- Roof: 256 ft (78 m)

Technical details
- Floor count: 17

Design and construction
- Architect: Hewitt & Emerson

Commerce Bank Building is a 256 ft (78 m) tall neoclassical style office building located on 416 Main Street in Downtown Peoria. The building has 17 floors and was built in 1920. Upon its completion it became the tallest building in Peoria, surpassing the 230 ft (70 m) tall Cathedral of St. Mary of the Immaculate Conception which was built in 1889. The building would later lose the title to the Peoria Twin Towers in 1984. The building was designed by Hewitt & Emerson.

The Peoria Life Insurance Company bought the land for the building in 1917, which was the former site of Rouse's Opera Hall. The Peoria Life Insurance Company would commission local architectural firm Hewitt & Emerson to design the building. Construction began in the Spring of 1918, but was halted for around four months due to WW1, construction resumed after the end of the war and the building was finally completed in 1920.

The top of the building is adorned by a lantern, which if included in the buildings height would make it 302 ft (92 m) tall.

The building would undergo renovations in 2022.

The building and most of Downtown Peoria was listed on the National Register of Historic Places in December 2018.

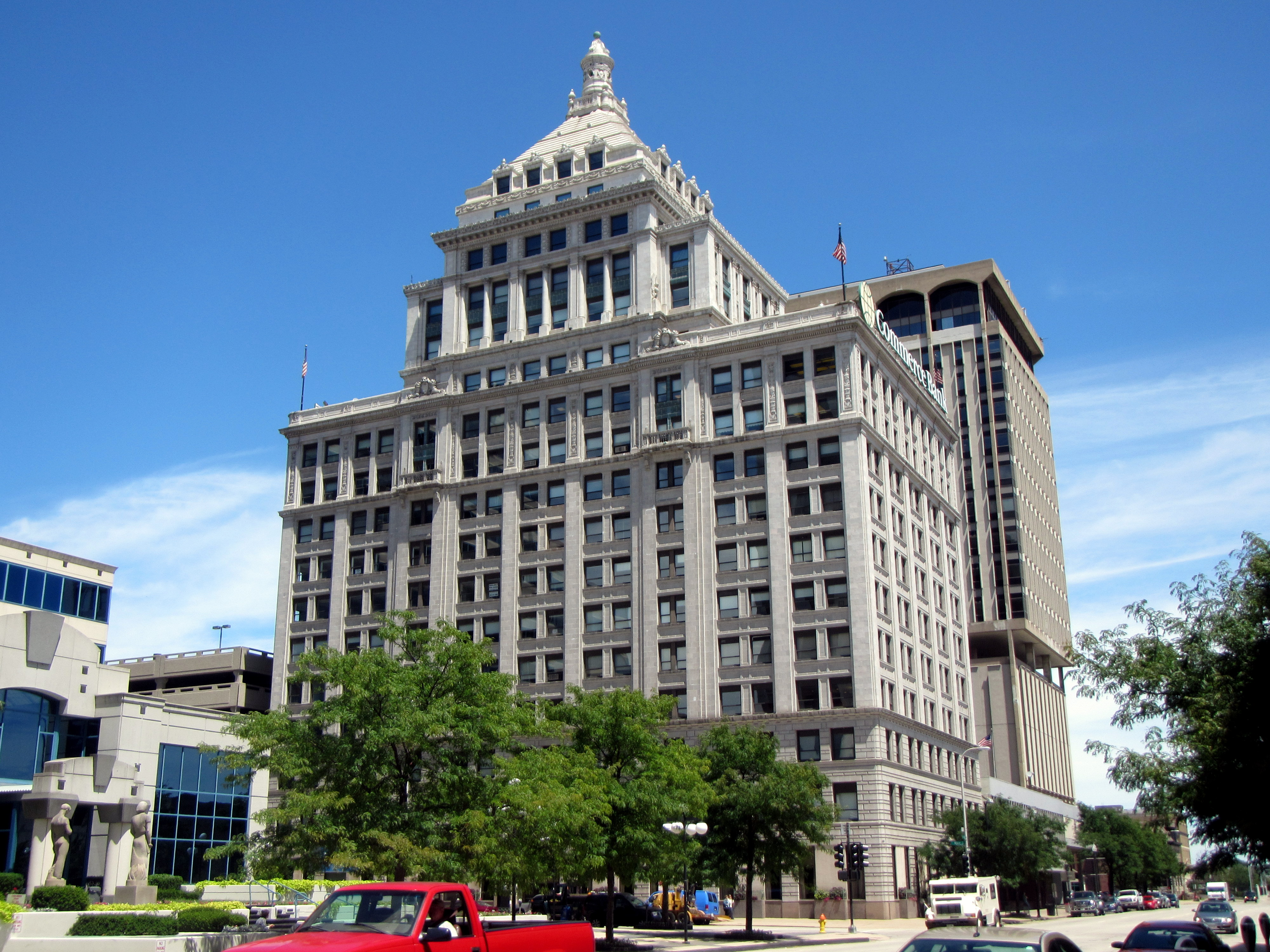
The Commerce Bank Building in July 2013

== See also ==
- List of tallest buildings in Illinois outside of Chicago
- Downtown Peoria Historic District
- Cathedral of Saint Mary of the Immaculate Conception (Peoria, Illinois)
- Peoria Marriott Pere Marquette
