= Marvin Robinson =

Marvin Robinson may refer to:

- Marvin Robinson (footballer)
- Marvin Robinson (politician)
- Marvin Robinson, American architect with Hazen and Robinson
