= Associated Bank Plaza =

Skyscraper in Peoria

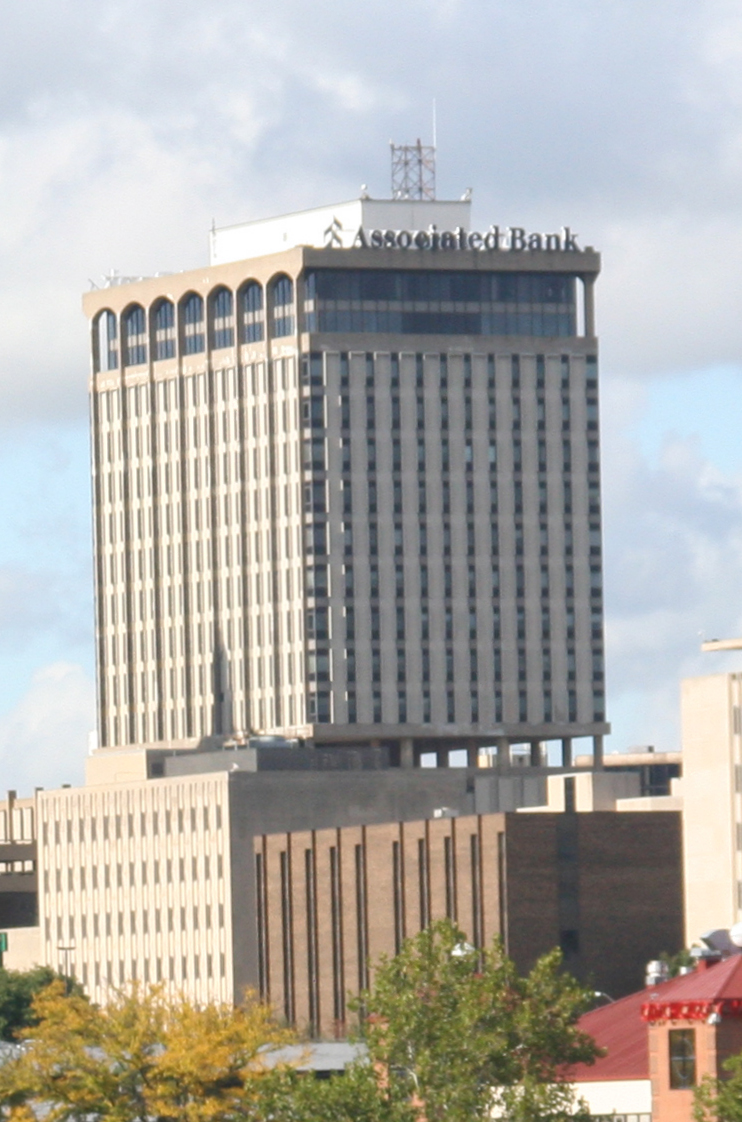
- Associated_Bank_Plaza_Peoria_Skyline_Panoramic_(cropped) Associated Bank Plaza in 2009.

- Location within Illinois Location within the United States

General information
- Status: Completed
- Type: Office
- Architectural style: Modern
- Location: 411 Hamilton Boulevard, Peoria, Illinois, United States
- Coordinates: 40°41′37″N 89°35′24″W
- Completed: 1961

Height
- Roof: 243 ft (74 m)

Technical details
- Floor count: 20

Design and construction
- Architect: BGK Group

Associated Bank Plaza (also known as Riverview Plaza and Chase Bank Plaza) is a 243 ft (74 m) tall modern office building located on 411 Hamilton Boulevard in Downtown Peoria, Illinois. The building has 20 floors and was built in 1961. Upon its completion it was the 2nd-tallest building in Peoria. As of January 2026, it is the 4th-tallest building in Peoria. The building was the tallest building built in the 1960s in Peoria. The building was designed by the BGK Group.

In February 2024, a water main leak damaged the buildings water sprinkler system, leading to the buildings closure. In September 2024, the owners of the building, MJ Illinois, reached a settlement with the city to fix the buildings sprinkler system by November 4th. The repairs never occurred, leading the city to fine the building's owner around $2 Million dollars in fines. In July 2025, the building's owners were required to put around $500,000 dollars into the repairing the sprinkler system by August 4th by the Peoria County Court; the city of Peoria agreed to drop the $2 Million dollars worth of fines given to the owners if they began the repairs.

In September 2024, the last remaining business in the building, Chase Bank vacated the building.

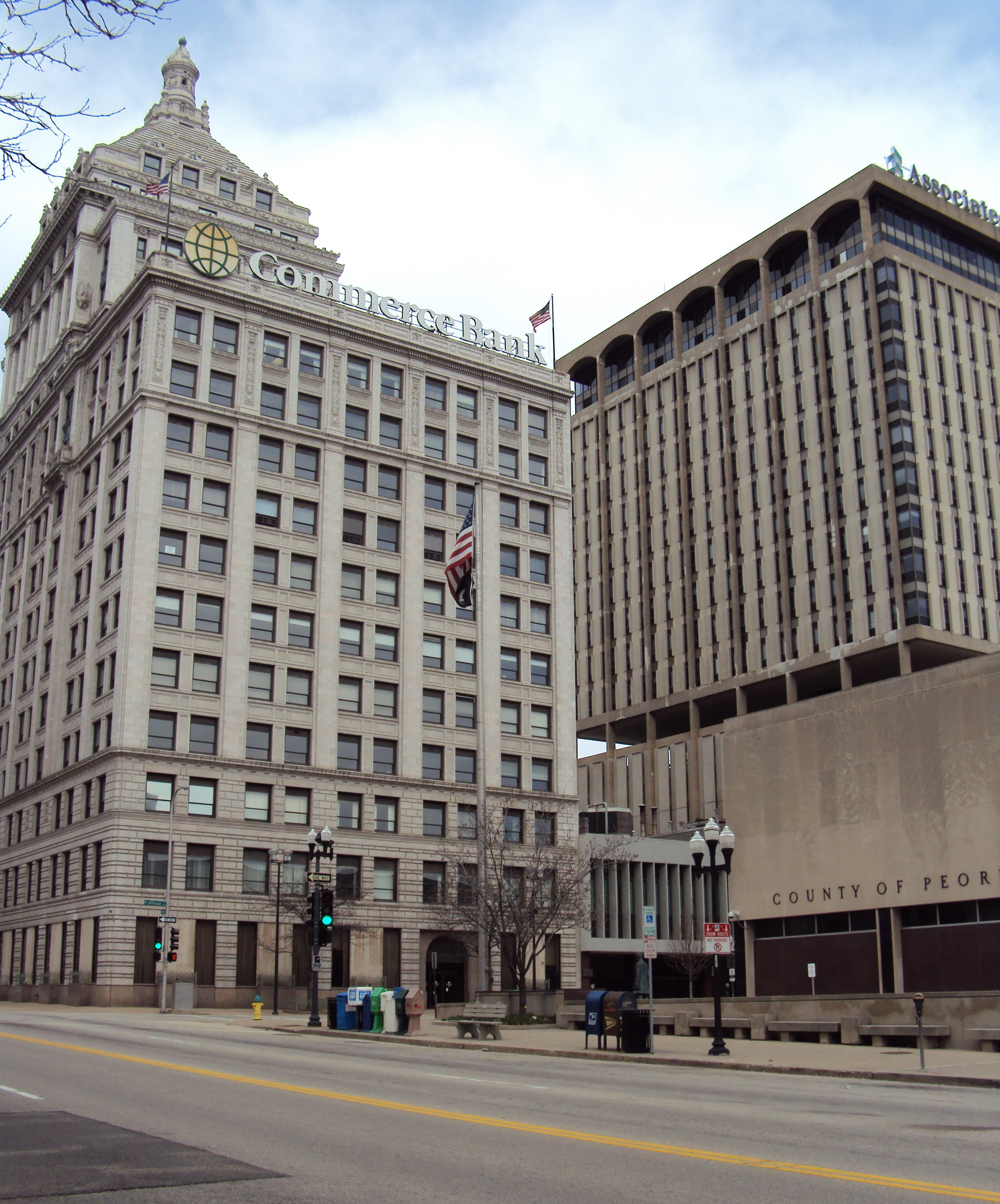
Associated Bank Plaza with the Commerce Bank Building in the foreground.

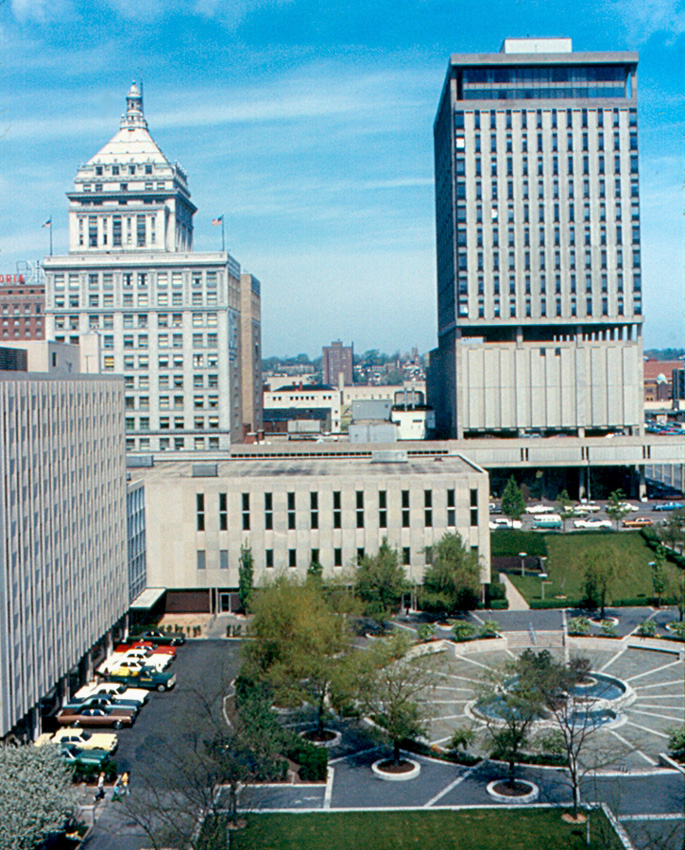
Associated Bank Plaza with the Commerce Bank Building on the left.

== See also ==
- List of tallest buildings in Illinois outside of Chicago
- Commerce Bank Building (Peoria, Illinois)
