= Grand Army of the Republic Memorial Hall (Peoria, Illinois) =

- U.S. National Register of Historic Places
- City of Peoria Local Historic Landmark
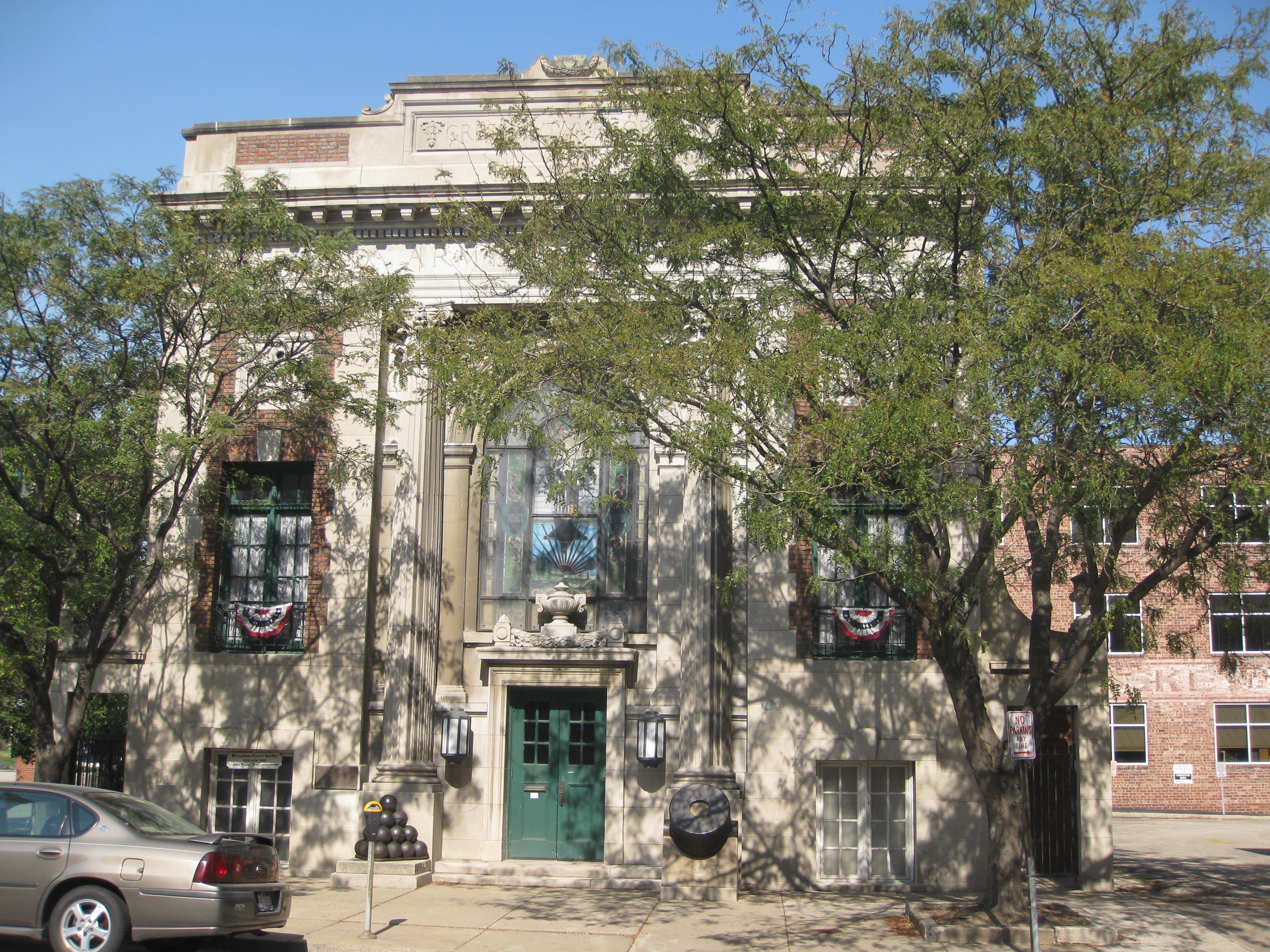

- Location within Peoria County, Illinois
- Location: 416 Hamilton Blvd., Peoria, Illinois
- Coordinates: 40°41′40.2″N 89°35′23.3″W
- Area: 0.1 acres (0.040 ha)
- Built: 1909
- Architect: Hewitt & Emerson
- Architectural style: Greek Revival, Classical Revival
- NRHP reference No.: 76000723
- Added to NRHP: July 13, 1976

The Grand Army of the Republic Memorial Hall, also known as the Greenhut Memorial, was constructed as a memorial to American Civil War soldiers in Peoria, Illinois, United States in 1909. It was designed by Hewitt & Emerson. The Classical Revival hall was dedicated to Joseph B. Greenhut, Captain of Company K, 82nd Illinois Volunteer Infantry Regiment. The building was added to the National Register of Historic Places on July 13, 1976, and was listed as an example of Beaux-Arts architecture. It is also listed as a City of Peoria Local Historic Landmark in March 1996.

== History ==
The hall was built for a cost of in $22,000 in 1909, which included the cost of the land. It served as a meeting place for veterans of the Civil War. Greenhut personally donated $15,000, approximately two-thirds of the building's cost, allowing the hall to open without debt.

By the 1950s, the Grand Army of the Republic society had disbanded as members died. The Central Illinois Landmarks Foundation purchased the building in the 1970s and restored the building. The building was rededicated in 1979.

The hall is available to rent for special events.

== Architecture ==
The building is an example of Neoclassicial, Classical Revival, and Beaux-Arts architecture styles.

The first floor has 2,956 sq ft (274.6 m^{2}) and the basement has 2,702 sq ft (251.0 m^{2}).

"Greenhut Memorial" was carved into the stone facade by Peoria sculptor Joseph Petarde. Corinthian columns, arched windows, and limestone eagles adorn the exterior. There are six stained glass windows, including one that showcases the GAR emblem. The GAR slogan (“Fraternity, Charity and Loyalty”) is inscribed in the main ballroom. A Civil War mortar from 1862 and a pyramid of cannonballs are featured outside the building.

Artwork housed at the GAR Hall include: portraits of Greenhut and his wife, marble bust of General John Logan by Peoria sculptor Fritz Triebel, and other Civil War exhibits.
