= Madison Theatre =

- U.S. National Register of Historic Places
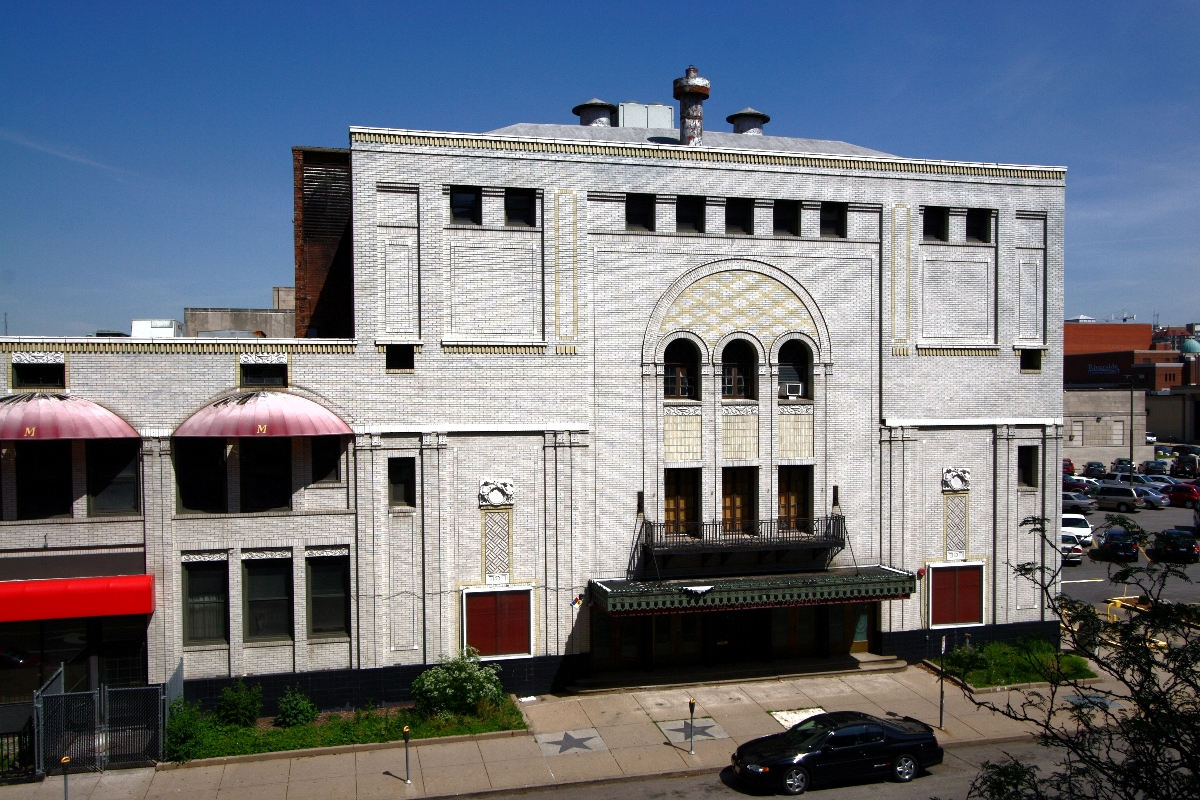

- Location within Illinois Location within the United States
- Location: 502 Main St., Peoria, Illinois
- Coordinates: 40°41′39″N 89°35′29″W
- Area: less than one acre
- Built: 1920
- Architect: Frederic J. Klein
- Architectural style: Classical Revival
- NRHP reference No.: 80001402
- Added to NRHP: November 21, 1980

Madison Theatre is a historic theater in Peoria, Illinois, United States that opened on October 16, 1920, as a silent picture theatre.

== History ==
The building was commissioned by Dee Robinson and designed by Peoria architect Frederick J. Klein. The theatre features an Italian Renaissance exterior and classical plasterwork on the interior walls and domed lobby ceilings. The lobby's terra-cotta plasterwork frames a triple-arched window above the marquee. The building is located across the street from the Pere Marquette Hotel.

The theatre opened in 1920 as a silent picture and vaudeville venue. It had 1,600 seats.

It was added to the National Register of Historic Places on November 21, 1980.

The Madison Theatre closed in the 1980s. It reopened as a comedy club and then again in 1992 as a dinner theatre.

From 1996 to 2002, the Theatre was revived under the management of Denny Debourbon and the Comfort Family who owned the property at that time.. Over 200 concerts took place during this period including live performances by George Winston, Ray Charles, The Smashing Pumpkins, Creed, REO Speedwagon, Fiona Apple, Todd Rundgren, moe., Gov't Mule, Widespread Panic, and Mudvayne. The theatre closed in 2003.

On June 4, 2016, firefighters were called to the theater around 10:30 P.M. for a significant fire that had broken out on or around the stage area. Officials stated the fire had been deliberately set, with damage estimated to be about $500,000.

On July 27, 2016, the City of Peoria filed a condemnation notification for the building. City inspectors reexamined the building on August 25. As most necessary repairs were complete at that time, the city's assistant community development director stated, "we'll likely dismiss the demolition case" after additional minor repairs were made.

On January 27, 2022, the recently formed non-profit organization 'The Madison Preservation Association' announced that it had obtained Madison Theatre ownership, via the charitable theatre donation from its longtime owner. After which, the organization will immediately embark upon the preliminarily estimated $30-$35 million Renovation of The Madison Theatre with an anticipated opening in mid-to-late 2024. The first stage involves renovation of the commercial spaces along Main Street, during the Summer or Fall of 2022, followed by the extensive full restoration of the actual Theatre building to past grandeur through 2023 until full completion during 2024.
