= Hewitt & Emerson =

American architectural firm

Practice information
- Partners: Herbert E. Hewitt FAIA; Frank N. Emerson FAIA; Richard S. Gregg AIA; Cecil C. Briggs AIA
- Founders: Herbert E. Hewitt FAIA; Frank N. Emerson FAIA
- Founded: 1909
- Location: Peoria, Illinois

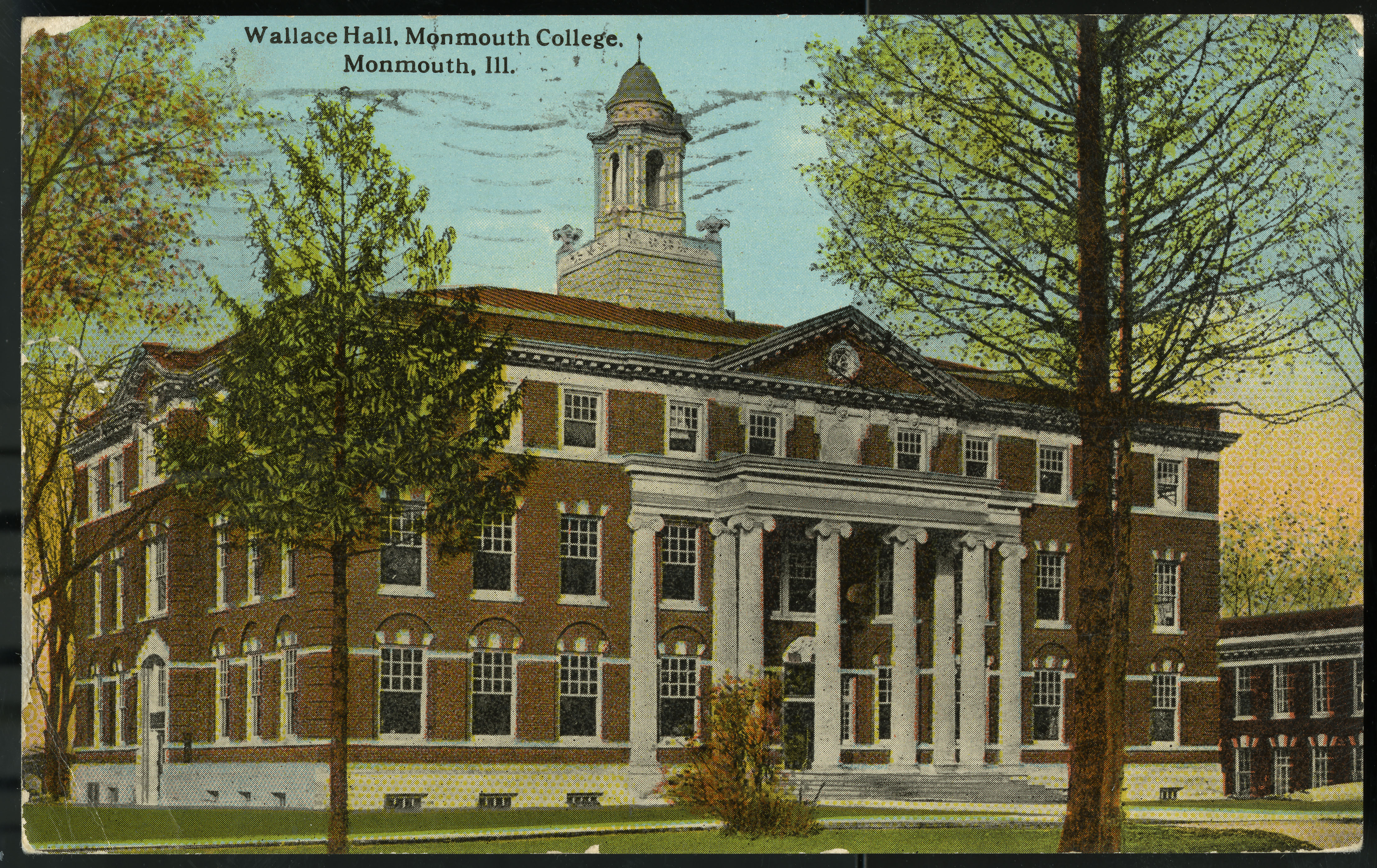
Wallace Hall, Monmouth College, Monmouth, Illinois designed by Hewitt, as seen prior to 1923 (built 1908, Classical Revival); Hewitt was recommended to receive the commission by noted architect D. Everett Waid.

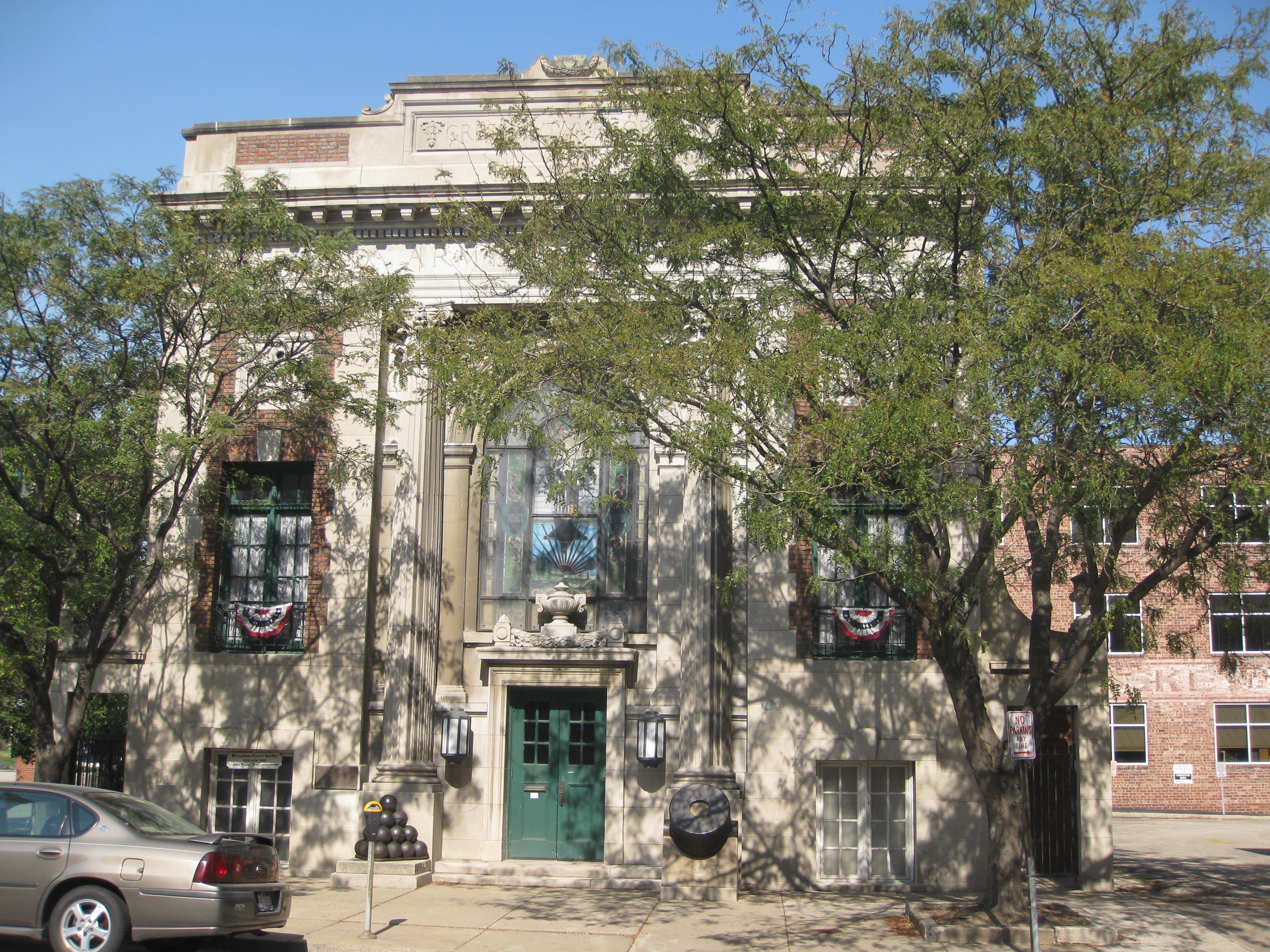
The Grand Army of the Republic Memorial Hall in Peoria, designed by Hewitt & Emerson and completed in 1909.

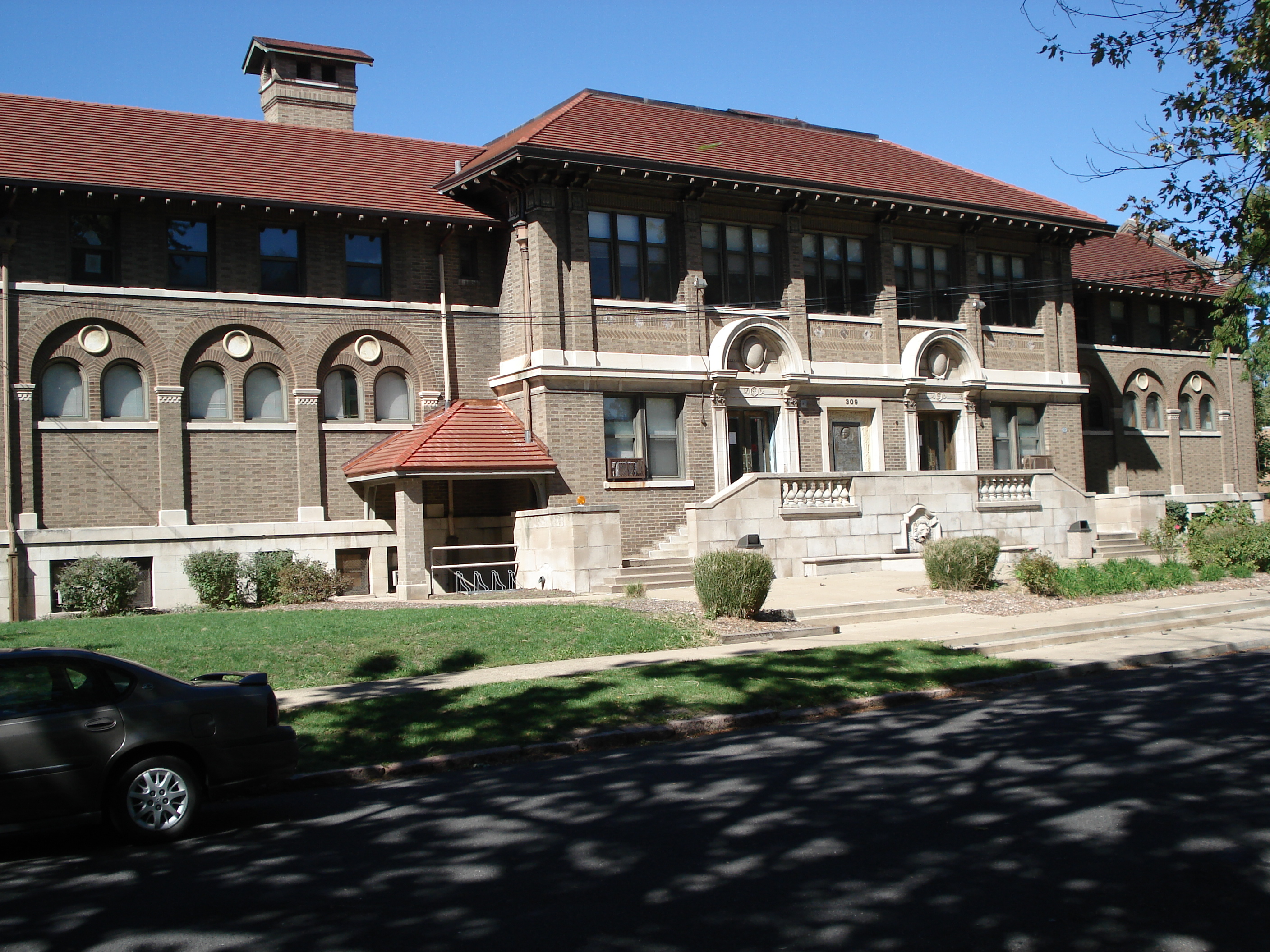
The John C. Proctor Recreation Center in Peoria, designed by Hewitt & Emerson and built in 1913.

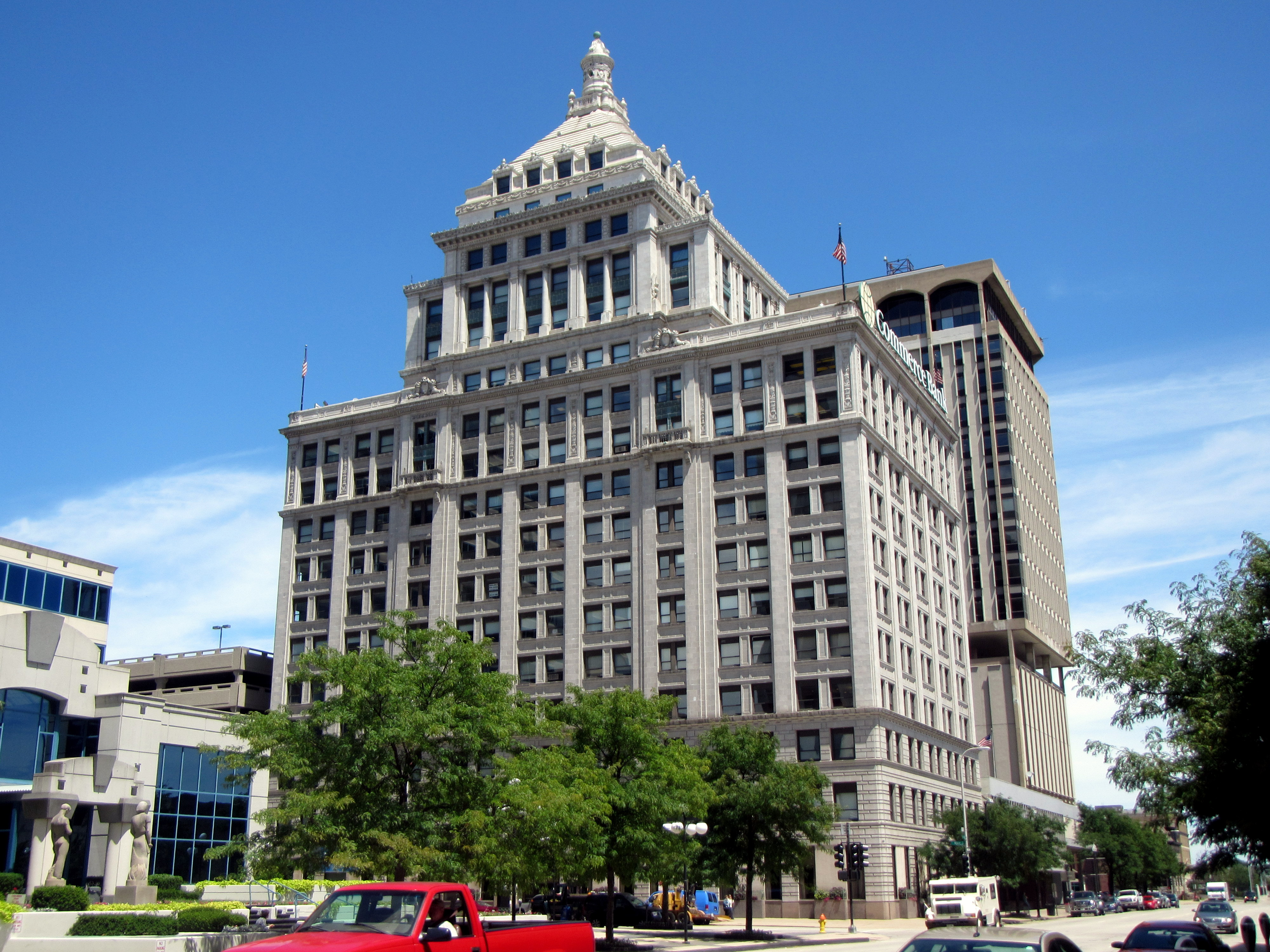
The Peoria Life Building, later the Commerce Bank Building, designed by Hewitt & Emerson and completed in 1920.

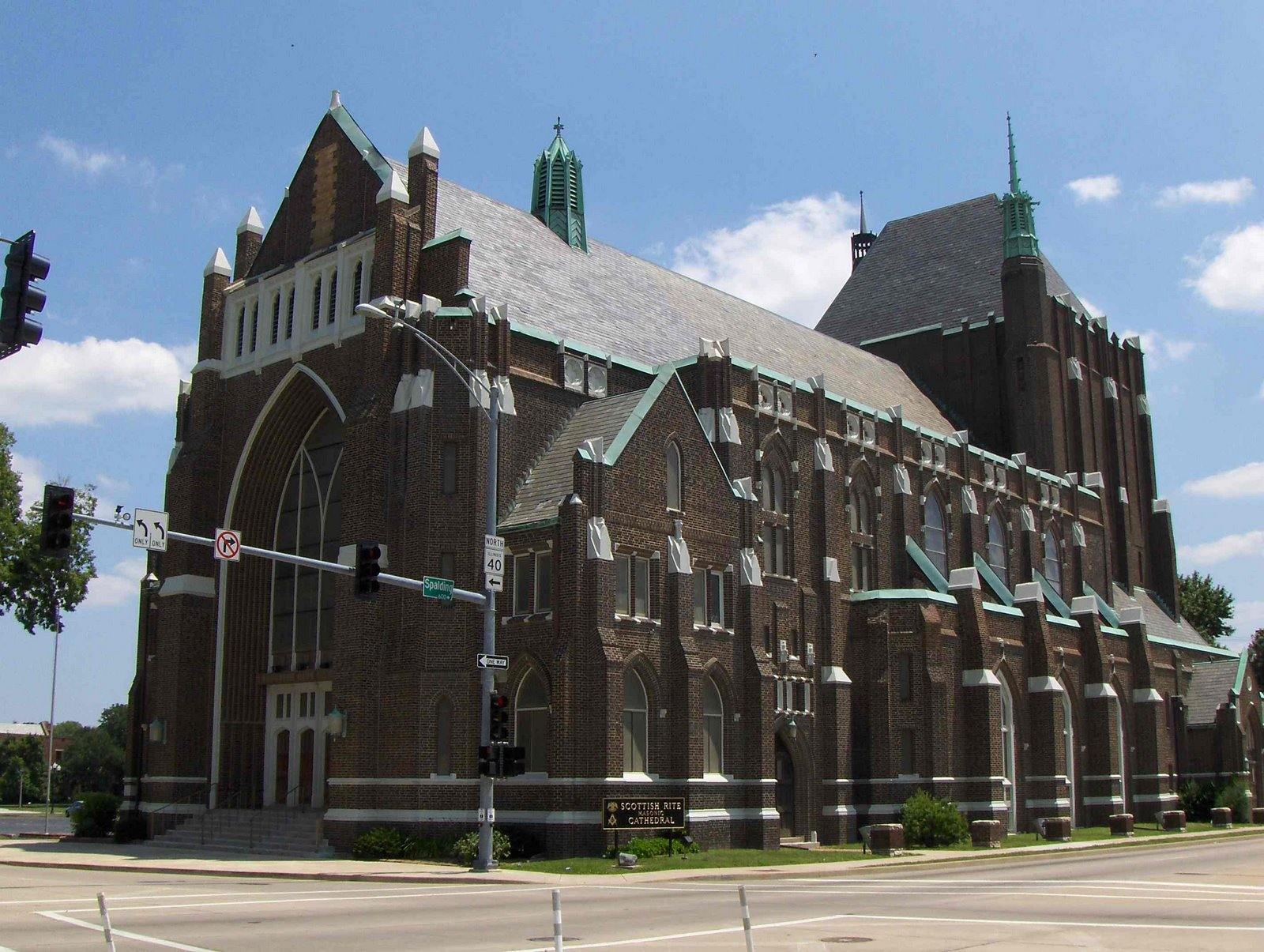
The Scottish Rite Cathedral in Peoria, designed by Hewitt & Emerson and completed in 1925.

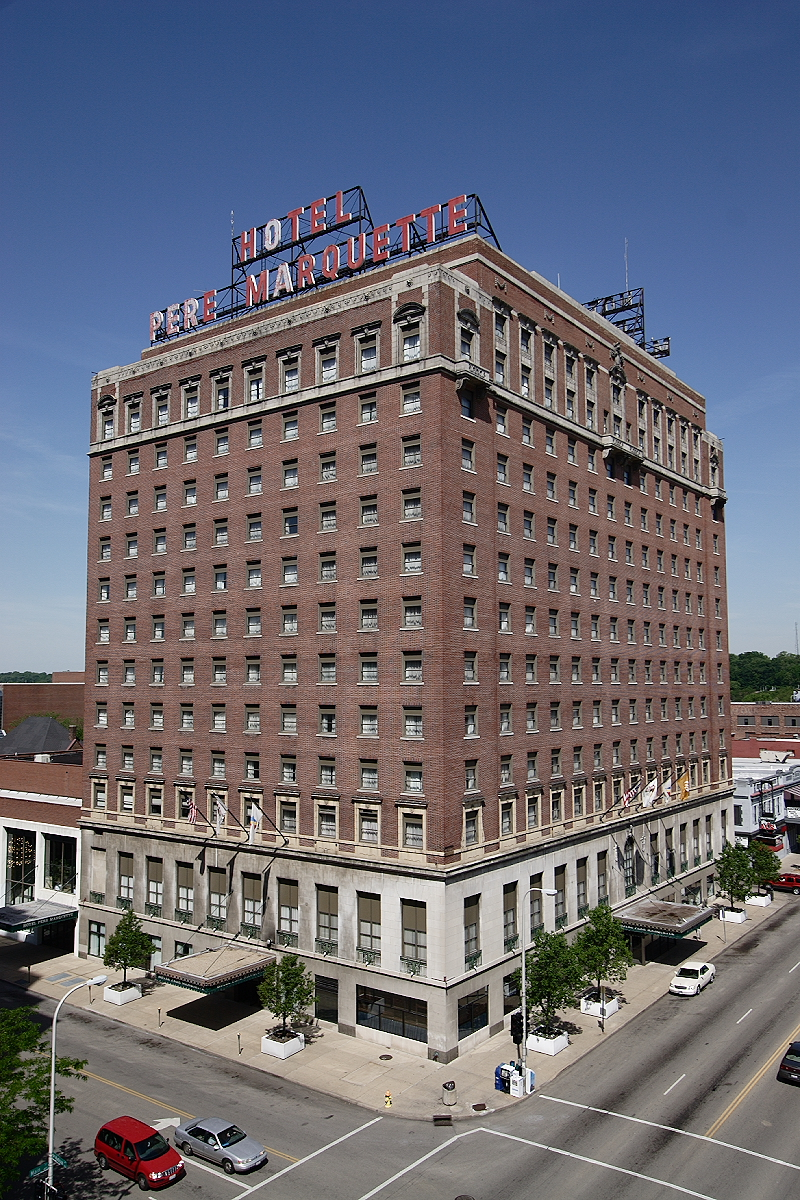
The Peoria Marriott Pere Marquette, designed by Horace Trumbauer and associate architects Hewitt & Emerson and completed in 1927.

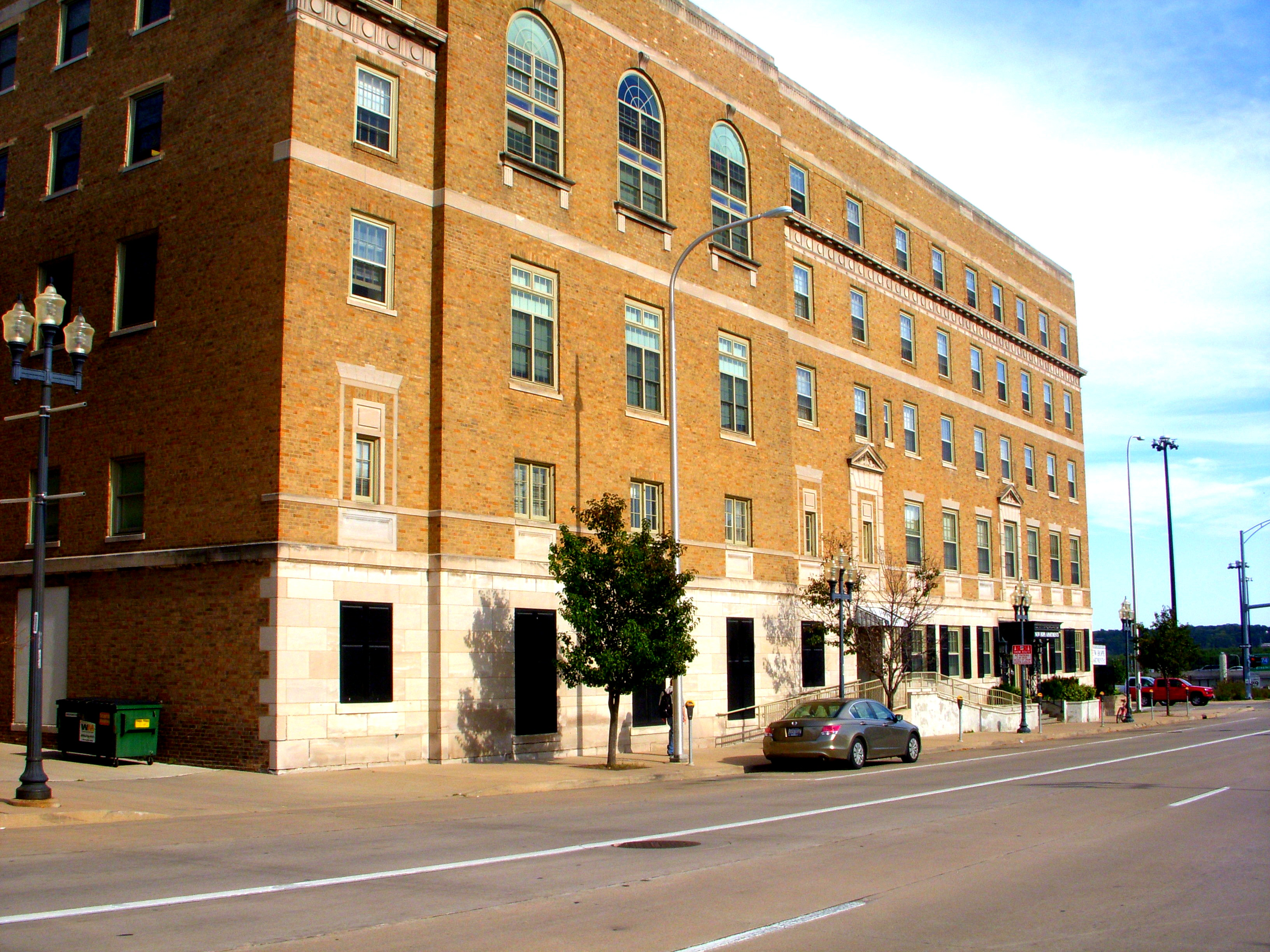
The former YWCA Building in Peoria, designed by Hewitt, Emerson & Gregg and completed in 1929.

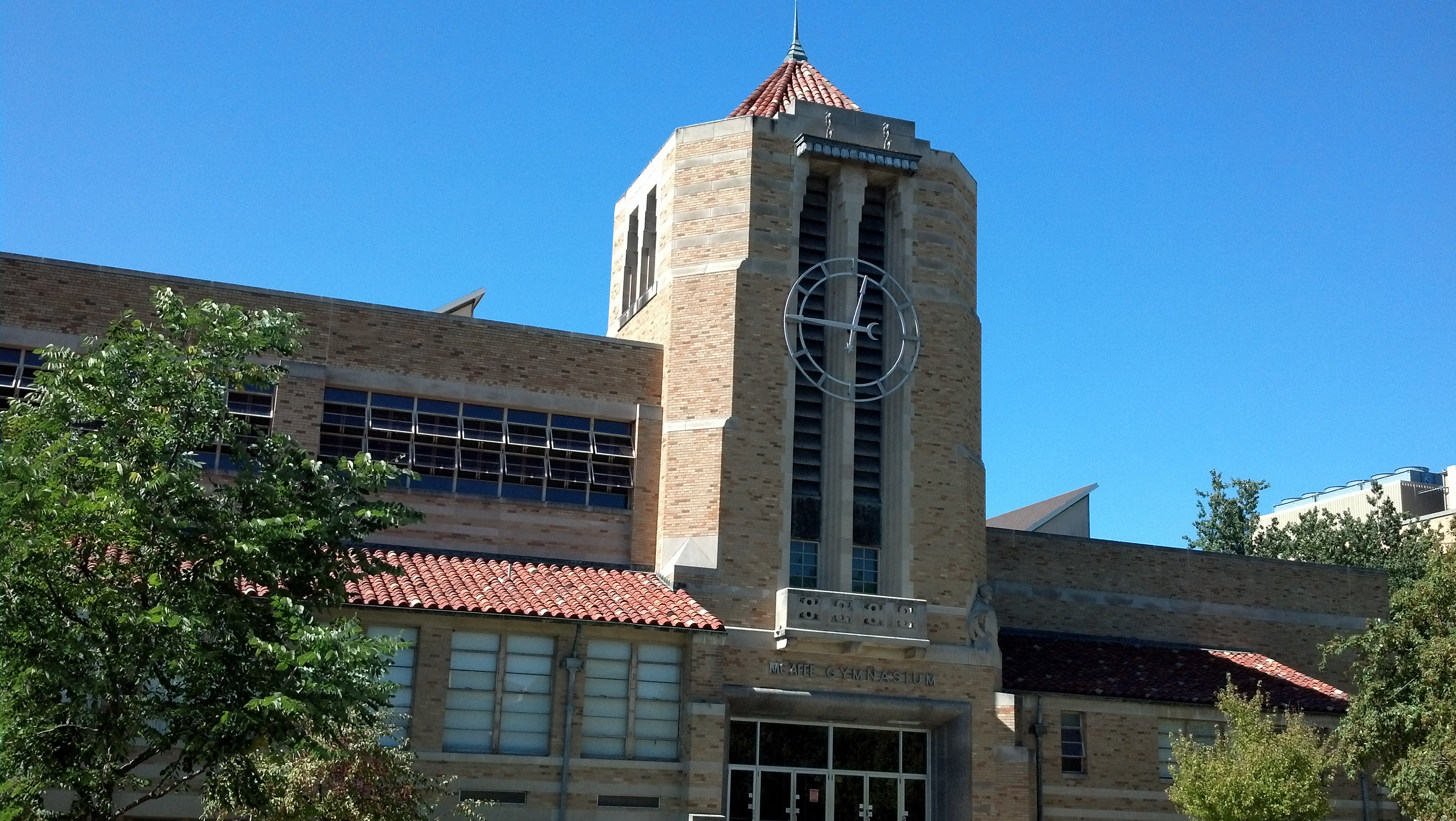
The Health Education Building at Eastern Illinois University, designed by Hewitt, Emerson & Gregg and built in 1938.

Hewitt & Emerson was an architectural firm based in Peoria, Illinois. It was founded in 1909 as the partnership of architects Herbert E. Hewitt and Frank N. Emerson. After 1927 it was known successively as Hewitt, Emerson & Gregg; Emerson, Gregg & Briggs and Gregg & Briggs. It was active until at least the 1960s.

== Partners and history ==
Hewitt & Emerson was formed in 1909 as the partnership of two architects, Herbert E. Hewitt and Frank N. Emerson.

Herbert Edmund Hewitt was born July 20, 1871, in Bloomington, Illinois, to Charles Edmund Hewitt and Helen (Thompson) Hewitt. He was raised in Peoria, where he attended the public schools. In 1889 he entered the University of Illinois but soon transferred to the Massachusetts Institute of Technology (MIT). He left without graduating in 1894. This was followed by a year of study at the University of Chicago and from 1895 to 1897 he worked as a drafter for a Chicago architect. In 1897 he returned to Peoria, where he formed the partnership of Wechselberger & Hewitt with architect Joseph Wechselberger. In 1898 Hewitt bought out his partner and continued as a sole practitioner until 1909, when he formed the partnership of Hewitt & Emerson with Frank N. Emerson.

Frank Nelson Emerson was born September 18, 1876, in Peoria to George Francis Emerson and Harriet (Woodruff) Emerson. He was educated in the Peoria public schools and at Princeton University and MIT, graduating with a AB from the former in 1898 and a SB in architecture from the latter in 1901. He then worked as a drafter in New York City before traveling to Paris in 1903, where he entered the Beaux-Arts atelier of architect Gustave Umbdenstock. He was admitted to the second, or junior, class of the École des Beaux-Arts itself in 1904. In late 1905 he returned to the United States where he joined the New York office of Carrère & Hastings. In 1909 he returned to Peoria, where he joined Hewitt.

Hewitt's association with the Beaux-Arts-trained Emerson may have prompted him to complete his own studies, as he returned to MIT and was awarded an SB in architecture in 1911. In 1927 they were joined in partnership by Richard S. Gregg, forming Hewitt, Emerson & Gregg.

Richard Seaton Gregg was born February 28, 1891, in Peoria. He was educated at the University of Illinois, graduating with a BS in architectural engineering in 1913. He worked for architects Temple & Burrows of Davenport, Iowa, until 1919, when he joined Hewitt & Emerson as a superintendent and specification writer.

Hewitt died October 24, 1944, at the age of 73. In 1945 the surviving partners were joined in partnership by Cecil C. Briggs, forming Emerson, Gregg & Briggs.

Cecil Clair Briggs was born April 10, 1904, in Waukee, Iowa. He was educated at Simpson College and Columbia University, graduating from the latter in 1928 with a BArch. Later that year he was awarded the Rome Prize which enabled him to study for three years at the American Academy in Rome. In 1931 he returned to Columbia in New York City, where he became a member of the architecture faculty. In 1940 he was appointed supervisor of the Pratt Institute School of Architecture, where he remained until relocating to Peoria in 1945.

Emerson retired in 1948 and died June 4, 1959, at the age of 82. His partners continued as Gregg & Briggs until 1958, when Gregg retired. Briggs continued the practice alone until at least the 1960s.

All four named partners of the firm were members of the American Institute of Architects (AIA). Hewitt and Emerson both were respected by their AIA peers and were elected fellows in 1932 and 1940, respectively.

== Legacy ==
The firm designed a number of works that are listed on the National Register of Historic Places.

N. Bruce Hazen, later a founder of Hazen and Robinson of Lincoln, Nebraska, worked for Hewitt & Emerson from 1922 to 1924.

== Architectural works ==
All dates are date of completion.

=== Herbert E. Hewitt, 1898–1909 ===
- Illinois building, South Carolina Inter-State and West Indian Exposition (1901, temporary building)
- Country Club of Peoria, Peoria, Illinois (1904, burned 1920)
- Creve Coeur Club, Peoria, Illinois (1904, demolished)
- Wallace Hall, Monmouth College, Monmouth, Illinois (1908)
- Hotel Goldman, Fort Smith, Arkansas (1910, demolished 1994)

=== Hewitt & Emerson, 1909–1927 ===
- Grand Army of the Republic Memorial Hall, Peoria, Illinois (1909, NRHP 1976)
- Orpheum Theatre, Peoria, Illinois (1911, demolished 1952)
- Carl Herget Mansion, Pekin, Illinois (1912, NRHP 1992)
- Jefferson Hotel, Peoria, Illinois (1912, demolished)
- Country Club of Peoria, Peoria, Illinois (1922)
- John C. Proctor Recreation Center, Peoria, Illinois (1913, NRHP 1979)
- Kewanee Hotel, Kewanee, Illinois (1916, NRHP 2006)
- Peoria Life Building, Peoria, Illinois (1920)
- Marquette Apartments, Peoria, Illinois (1924, NRHP 2016)
- Scottish Rite Cathedral, Peoria, Illinois (1925)
- Commercial National Bank Building, Peoria, Illinois (1926)
- Pere Marquette Hotel, Peoria, Illinois (1927, NRHP 1982)
- Peoria Cordage Company rope mill building, Peoria, Illinois (no date, NRHP 1982)

=== Hewitt, Emerson & Gregg, 1927–1945 ===
- Gamma Phi Beta Sorority House, Urbana, Illinois (1927, NRHP 1994)
- YWCA Building, Peoria, Illinois (1929)
- Dwight Correctional Center (former), Dwight, Illinois (1930)
- Roosevelt Junior High School, Peoria, Illinois (1932)
- Health Education Building, Eastern Illinois University, Charleston, Illinois (1938, NRHP 1995)
- Mohammed Temple Shrine Mosque (former), Peoria, Illinois (1938)

=== Emerson, Gregg & Briggs, 1945–1948 ===
- Cullom–Davis Library, Bradley University, Peoria, Illinois (1950)

=== Gregg & Briggs, 1948–1958 ===
- Greater Peoria YMCA (former), Peoria, Illinois (1953)
- Wyckoff Hall, Bradley University, Peoria, Illinois (1953)
- East Peoria Community High School, East Peoria, Illinois (1955)
- Jobst Hall, Bradley University, Peoria, Illinois (1955, demolished 2020)
- Central Illinois Light Company Building, Peoria, Illinois (1959)

=== Cecil C. Briggs, after 1958 ===
- Phillips Library, Aurora University, Aurora, Illinois (1961)
