= Peoria Cordage Company =

- U.S. National Register of Historic Places
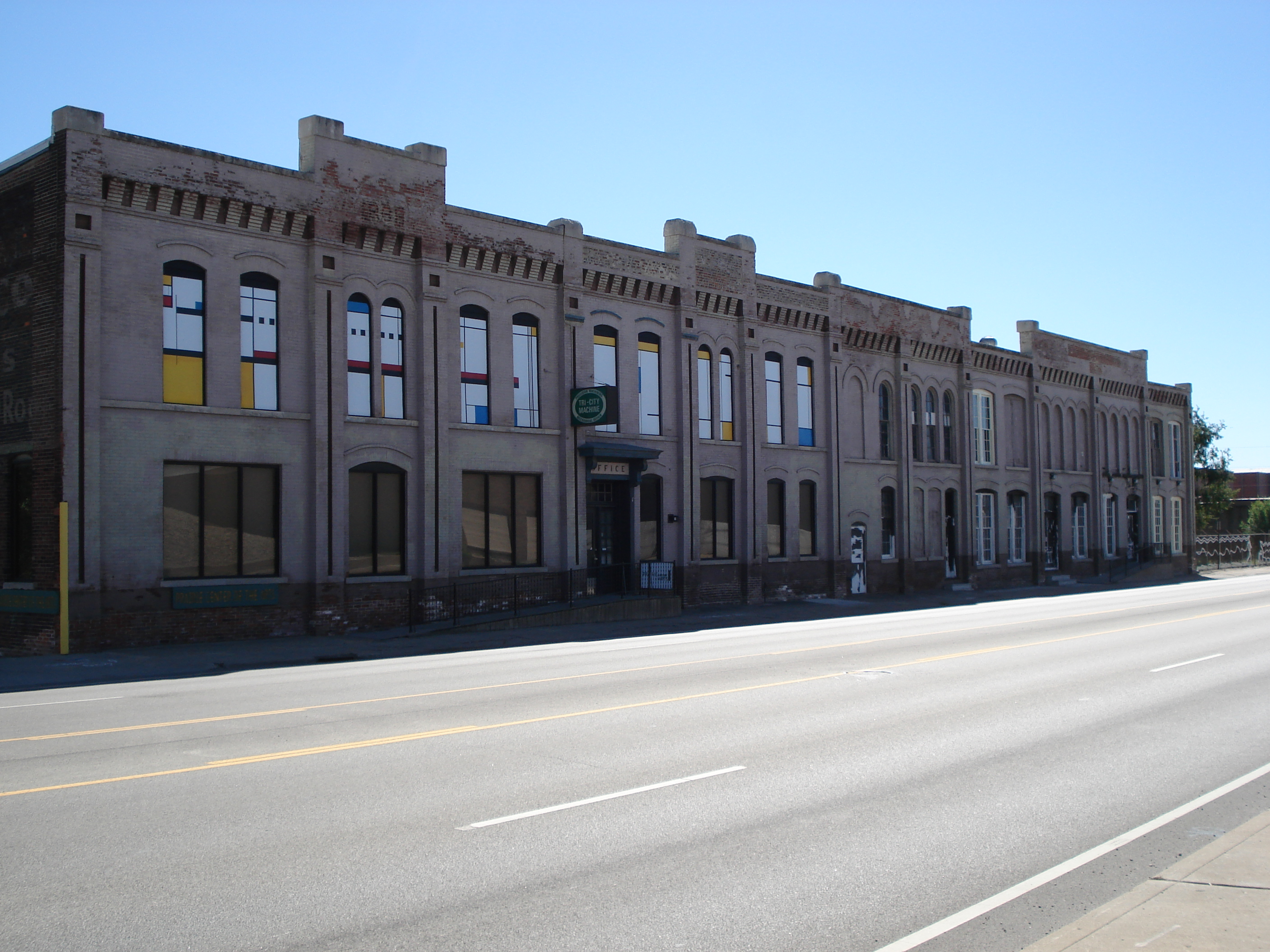

- Location within Peoria County, Illinois
- Location: Peoria, Peoria County, Illinois
- Coordinates: 40°40′51″N 89°36′15″W
- Area: 3.2 acres (1.3 ha)
- Built: c. 1888-1915
- Architect: Hewitt & Emerson, Paul S. Lietz, Unknown
- NRHP reference No.: 82002592
- Added to NRHP: March 19, 1982

Peoria Cordage Company was a major manufacturer of twine and cords, It operated in Peoria, Illinois for almost a century.

== History ==
Peoria Cordage Company was founded in 1888 by Martin Kingman of Peoria and Edward C. Heidrich of Miamisburg, Ohio. It made baling twine and other materials used in agriculture in the Midwestern United States. As the years passed, company ownership was kept within the Heidrich family. By 1937, Peoria Cordage produced 250 million lb (110 million kg) of product. After World War II, although still an industry leader, Peoria Cordage's output had dropped to 4.4 million lb (2.0 million kg). Through most of its existence the company relied on natural fibers imported from around the world. In 1965 it introduced synthetic fibers, but by 1975 the company had succumbed to economic pressures.

== Historic building site ==
The Peoria Cordage Company buildings are located in an area of one and two story industrial and commercial buildings in the city of Peoria, Illinois, United States. Most of the buildings in the area were constructed between 1890 and 1920. The site consisted of ten buildings when the property was nominated and listed on the National Register of Historic Places in 1982, three of the buildings carried more historical significance than the others. These included the Rope Mill, the New Mill and the Old Mill. The company was founded in 1888 by Edward C. Heidrich and Martin Kingman in response to the growing demand for binding twine.

The site includes work by architects Hewitt & Emerson.
