= Carl Herget Mansion =

Historic house in Illinois, United States

- U.S. National Register of Historic Places
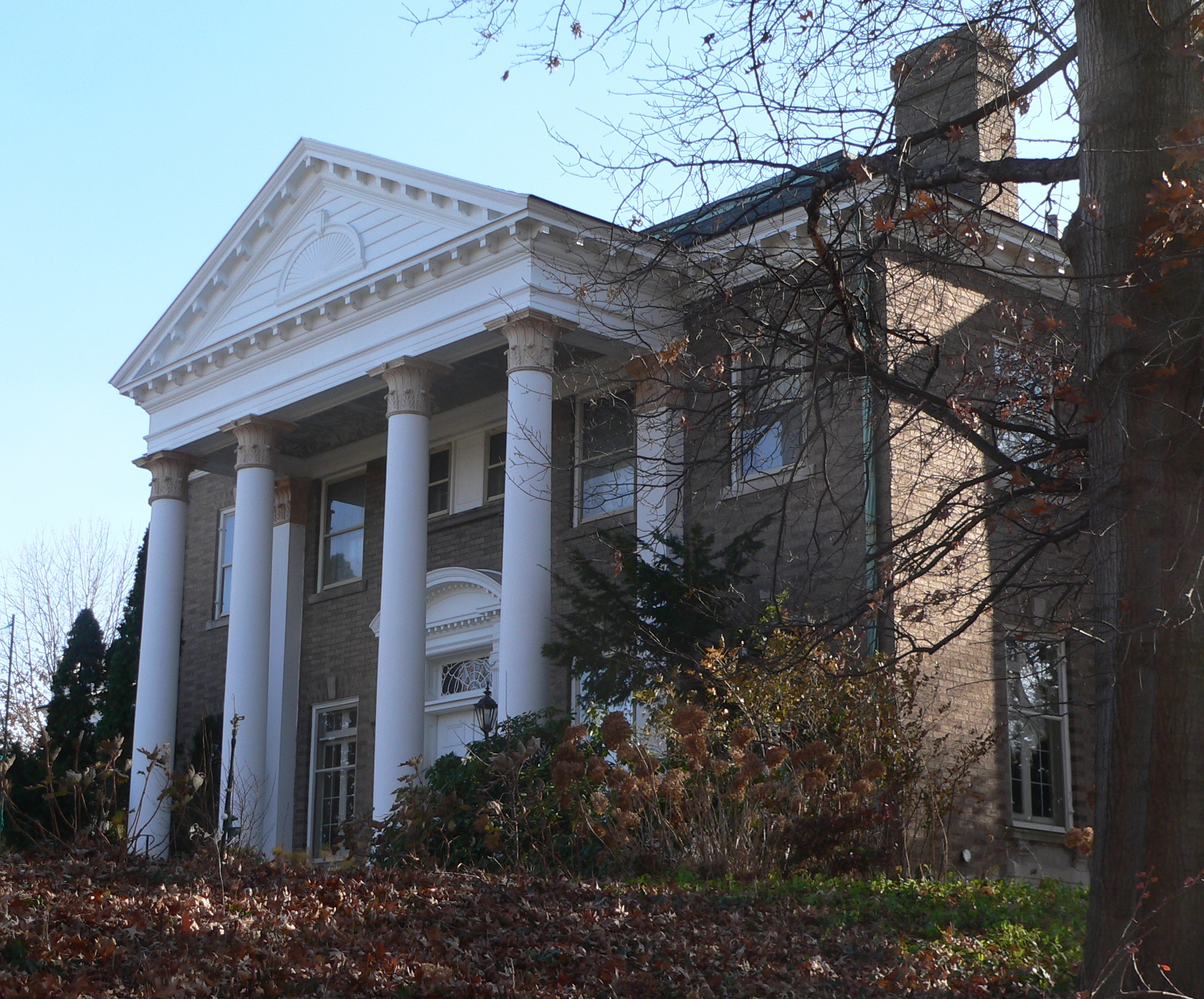

- Location within Illinois
- Location: 420 Washington St., Pekin, Illinois
- Coordinates: 40°33′52″N 89°38′47″W
- Area: 1 acre (0.40 ha)
- Built: 1912
- Architect: Hewitt & Emerson
- Architectural style: Classical Revival
- NRHP reference No.: 92001005
- Added to NRHP: August 18, 1992

The Carl Herget Mansion is a historic house located at 420 Washington Street in Pekin, Illinois. The house was built in 1912 for Carl Herget, a businessman and member of one of Pekin's most prominent families.

== Architecture ==
Prominent Peoria architectural firm Hewitt & Emerson designed the Classical Revival house; the style was in vogue in the early twentieth century, mainly due to its use at the 1893 Columbian Exposition. The front entrance features a full-height porch topped by a pediment and supported by four Corinthian columns and two Corinthian pilasters. The entrance itself is flanked by Ionic pilasters and topped by a fanlight and dentillated segmental pediment. The south and east sides each feature porches with Doric columns and balustrades.

There are fourteen rooms, three fireplaces, and a third floor ballroom.

== History ==
The house served as the headquarters for Vogel's Inc and its subsidiary, Bird Provision Co in 1961. It then became attorney's offices until 1992. It later housed a bed and breakfast named Herget House Bed and Breakfast.

The house was listed on the National Register of Historic Places on August 18, 1992. The yard was restored to original landscaping and certified as a National Wildlife Habitat.
