= YWCA Building (Peoria, Illinois) =

Coordinates: 40.6948°N 89.5882°W

- U.S. National Register of Historic Places
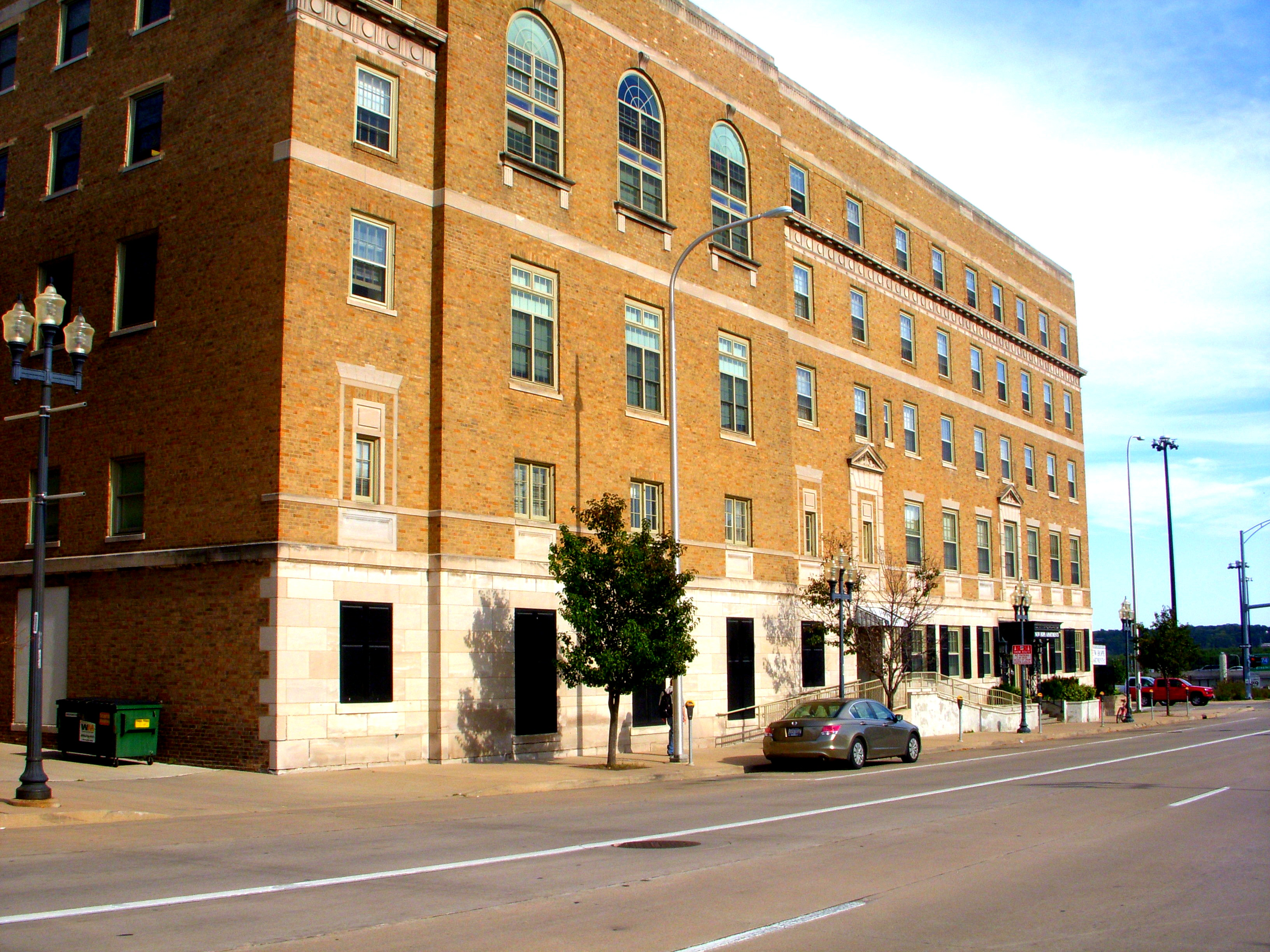

- Location within Illinois Location within the United States
- Nearest city: Peoria, Illinois
- Area: less than one acre
- Built: 1928
- Architect: Hewitt, Emerson & Gregg; W.M. Allen Son & Company
- Architectural style: Colonial Revival, Classical Revival
- NRHP reference No.: 07000147
- Added to NRHP: May 17, 2007

The YWCA Building in Peoria, Illinois was built in 1928. It was designed by Hewitt, Emerson & Gregg. The building was listed on the National Register of Historic Places in 2007. It sits at 301 Northeast Jefferson Avenue, at the north corner with Fayette Street in downtown Peoria.

The Peoria chapter of the YWCA was founded in 1893. By 1928 it had run out of space in its original building; it raised $350,000 in just eight days to build this replacement. This building was dedicated on September 16, 1929. Among its features were an auditorium, swimming pool, chapel, several club rooms, and residential facilities for 86 people.

The YWCA moved out of this building in 2003; headquarters moved to 1013 West Lake Avenue in Lakeview Park, where the YWCA had maintained a campground since the late 1960s. Later, partially due to funding a new pool at the YWCA Lakeview building in the 2000s, the Peoria YWCA became financially distressed, moving out of the Lakeview building in 2011 and closing down completely in the summer of 2012.

Since April 2008, this building has been New Hope Apartments, supportive housing with 79 apartments. Renovation cost almost $8 million, and new apartments were created in part by building over the top of the pool and inside the space of the former two-story gymnasium. The New Hope project was originally planned for the International Harvester Building, also on the National Register of Historic Places, but was blocked by the city government.
