= List of tallest buildings in Illinois outside of Chicago =

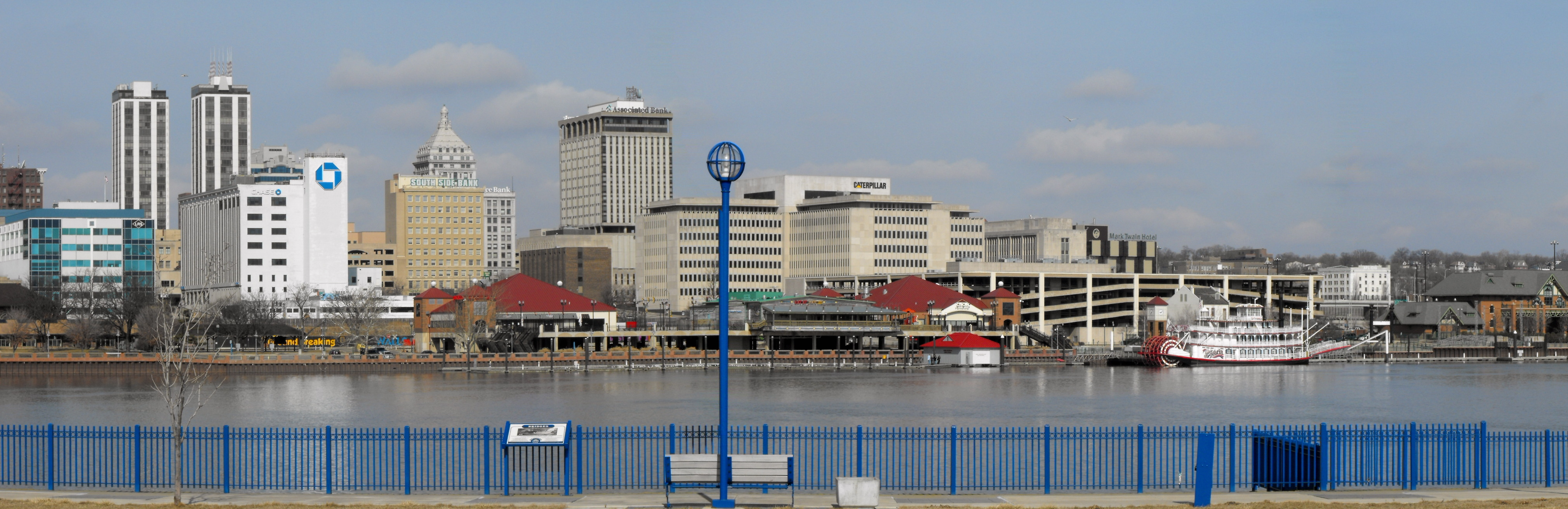
Skyline of Peoria in 2009

This list of tallest buildings in Illinois outside of Chicago ranks skyscrapers and high-rises in the U.S. State of Illinois by height excluding Chicago. This list encompasses both Downstate Illinois and cities within the Chicago metropolitan area. The tallest building in Illinois excluding Chicago is Oakbrook Terrace Tower in Oakbrook Terrace, a Chicago suburb. The tallest building in Downstate Illinois is the Illinois State Capitol in Springfield. The tallest habitable building in Downstate Illinois is Wyndham Springfield City Centre in Springfield.

The majority of buildings on this list were built in the mid-late 20th century, although the oldest building is the 1928 Leland Tower in Aurora. In the 21st century, only Evanston and Champaign have built new buildings over 200 ft (61 m). As of September 2025, they are also the only cities to have any buildings approved or proposed at this height.

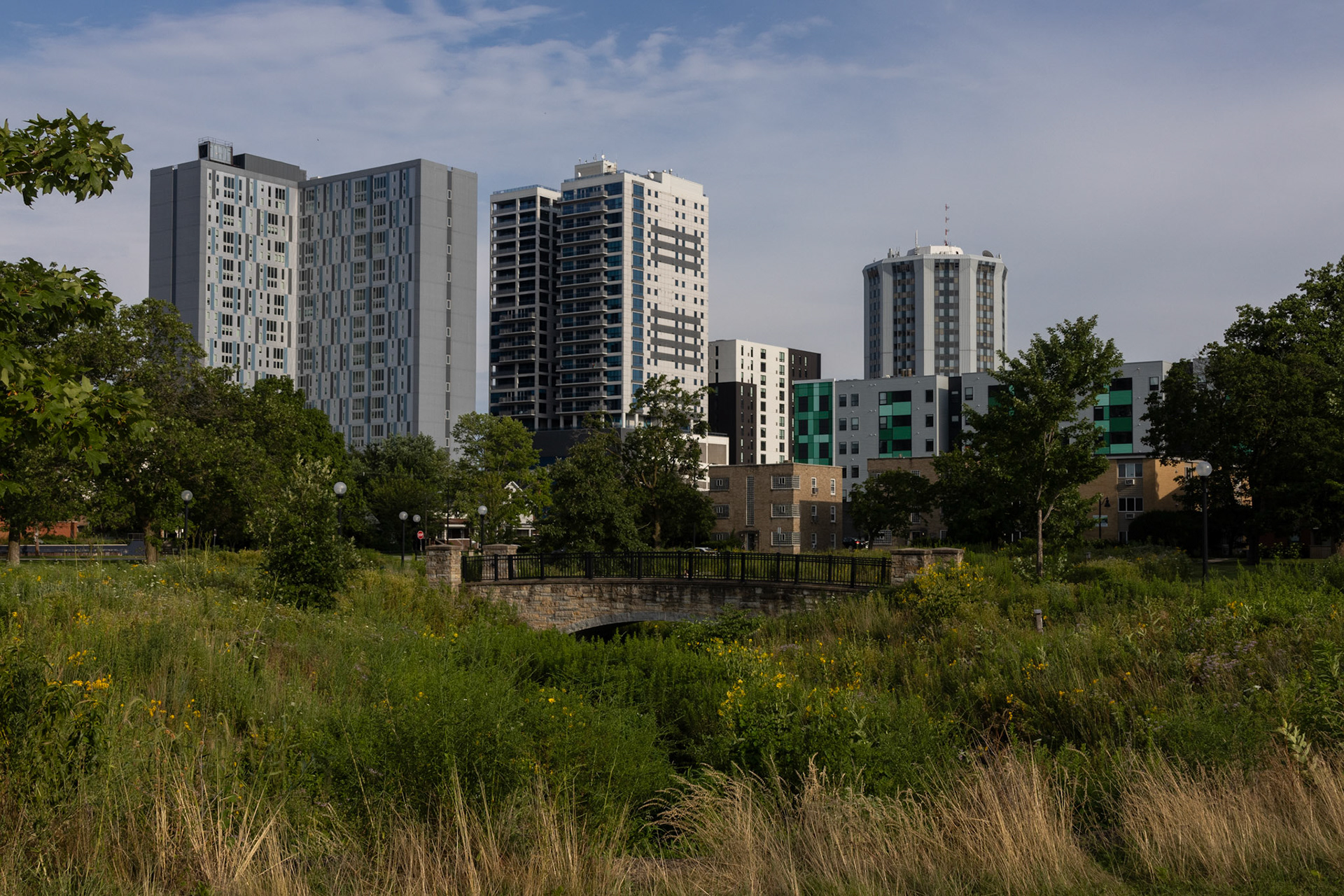
Skyline of Campustown (Champaign, Illinois) in 2024

== Tallest buildings ==
This list ranks buildings that stand at least 200 ft (61 m) tall, based on standard height measurement.

Rank	Name	Image	Height	Floors	Year	City	Notes
1	Oakbrook Terrace Tower		418 ft (127 m)	31	1987	Oakbrook Terrace	
2	Illinois State Capitol		361 ft (110 m)	5	1888	Springfield	
3	Wyndham Springfield City Centre		352 ft (107 m)	30	1974	Springfield	
4	Watterson Towers		298.5 ft (91.0 m)	28	1969	Normal	
~5	Schaumburg Towers I		294 ft (90 m)	20	1986	Schaumburg	
~5	Schaumburg Towers II		294 ft (90 m)	20	1986	Schaumburg	
~7	Twin Towers 1		282 ft (86 m)	29	1984	Peoria	
~7	Twin Towers 2			29	1984	Peoria	
~7	Woodfield Corporate Center		282 ft (86 m)	21	1986	Schaumburg	
10	Orrington Plaza		277 ft (84 m)	22	1969	Evanston	Also known as Bank One Building, State National Bank Building, NBD Bank Building, First Chicago Bank Building, and the Chase Bank Building
11	Sherman Plaza		276 ft (84 m)	25	2007	Evanston	Also known as The Shermaniator
12	College Corner		268 ft (82 m)	24	2009	Champaign	
13	HERE		267 ft (81 m)	26	2015	Champaign	
14	Optima Views		265 ft (81 m)	28	2003	Evanston	
15	Leland Tower			22	1928	Aurora	
16	Commerce Bank Building		256 ft (78 m)	17	1920	Peoria	
17	Associated Bank Plaza		243 ft (74 m)	20	1961	Peoria	
18	One Rotary Center		237 ft (72 m)	18	1977	Evanston	
19	Park Evanston Apartments		236 ft (72 m)	24	1997	Evanston	
20	Burnham 310		224 ft (68 m)	18	2008	Champaign	
21	Becker Building		211 ft (64 m)	16	1993	Peoria	
22	The Tower at Third		205 ft (62 m)	21	1972	Champaign	
23	Joshua Arms		203 ft (62 m)	19	1978	Joliet	Previously known as Salem Tower

== Tallest buildings proposed, approved, or under construction ==
Name	Height	Floors	Year (est.)	City	Status	Notes
605 Davis Street	330 ft (100 m)	31		Evanston	Approved	
900 Clark Street	315 ft (96 m)	27		Evanston	Under Review	
201 E. Green St.		16		Champaign	Approved	

== See also ==
- List of tallest buildings in Chicago
- List of tallest buildings in the Quad Cities
- List of tallest buildings in Champaign
