= John C. Proctor Recreation Center =

- U.S. National Register of Historic Places
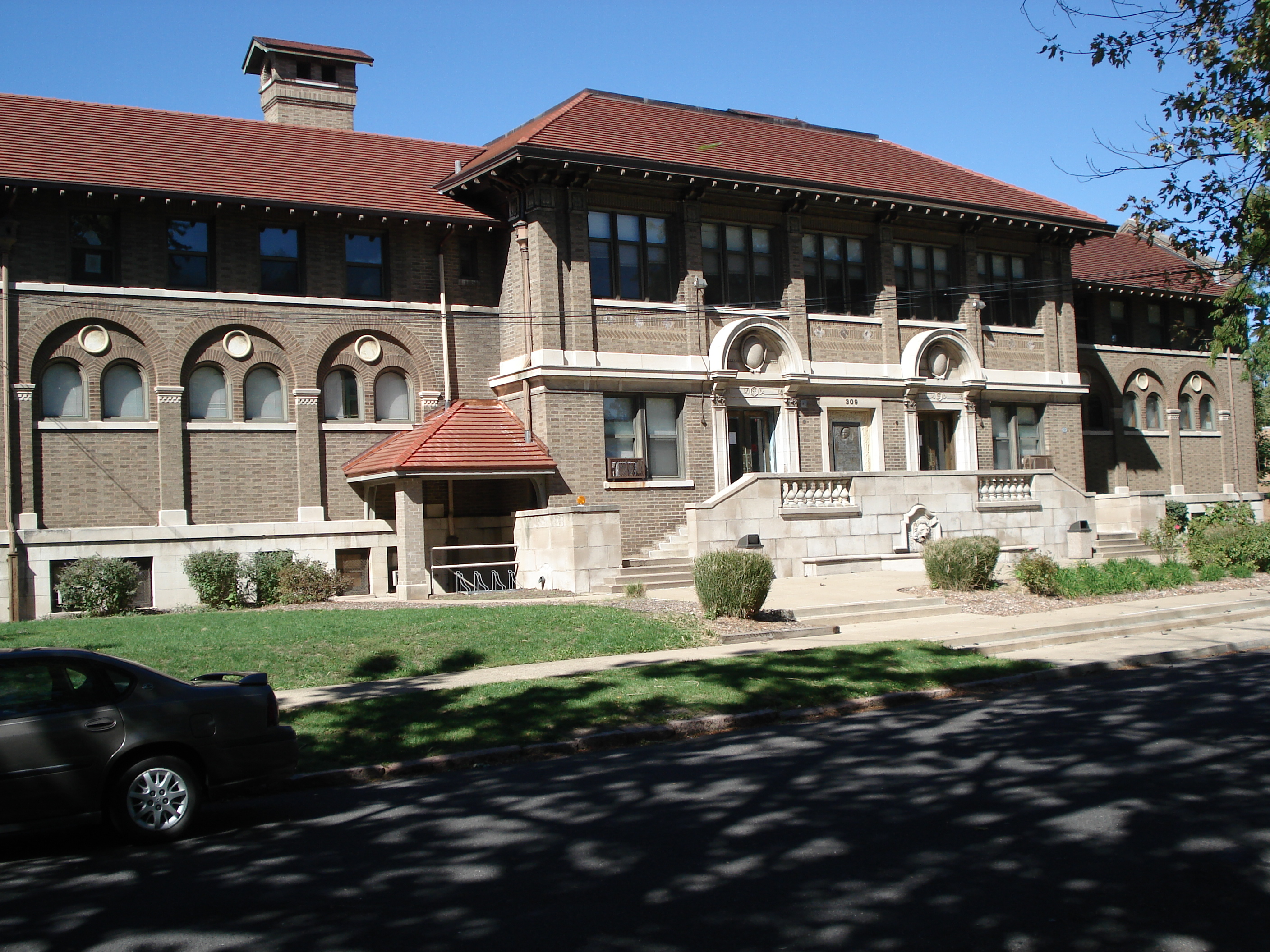

- Location within Peoria County, Illinois
- Location: 300 S. Allen St, Peoria, Illinois
- Coordinates: 40°41′7″N 89°36′58″W
- Area: 5 acres (2.0 ha)
- Built: 1913
- Architect: Hewitt & Emerson
- Architectural style: Classical Revival
- NRHP reference No.: 79000860
- Added to NRHP: September 6, 1979

The John C. Proctor Recreation Center was constructed in Peoria, Illinois, United States in 1913. The Classical Revival center was built per the provisions of its founders will, John C. Proctor. It was designed by Hewitt & Emerson. The building was added to the National Register of Historic Places on September 6, 1979.

The building is a facility operated by the Peoria Parks District. Facilities include a swimming pool, two gymnasiums, an auditorium, outdoor basketball courts, a playground, and the African American Hall of Fame Museum.
