= Marquette Apartments =

- U.S. National Register of Historic Places
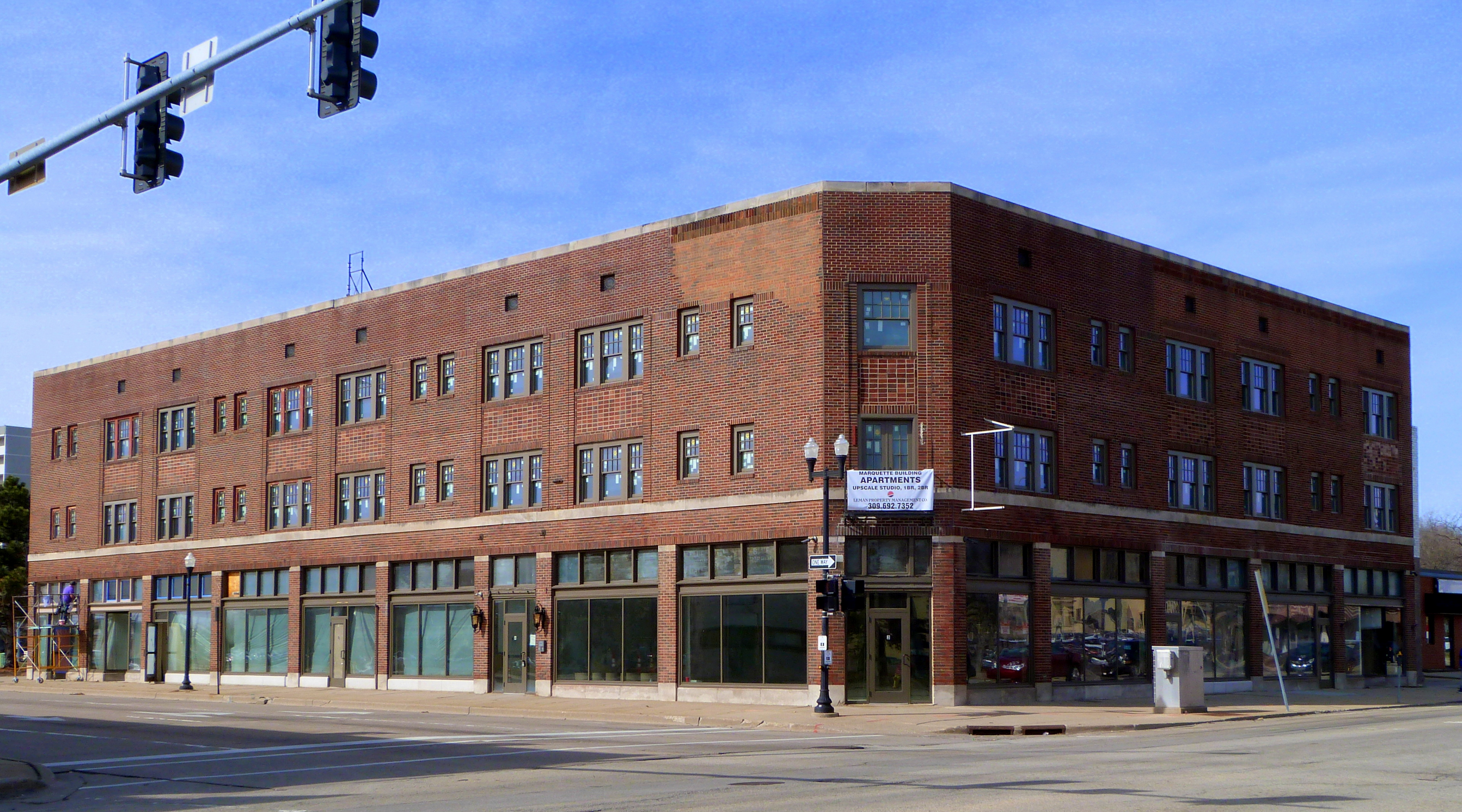

- Location within Peoria County, Illinois Location within Illinois Location within the United States
- Location: 701 Main St., Peoria, Illinois
- Coordinates: 40°41′45″N 89°35′39″W
- Built: 1924
- Built by: V. Jobst & Sons
- Architect: Hewitt & Emerson
- NRHP reference No.: 16000901
- Added to NRHP: December 27, 2016

Marquette Apartments is a historic apartment building located at 701 Main Street in Peoria, Illinois. The building was built in 1924 to help meet the need for housing in downtown Peoria, as the number of downtown workers looking for housing near their jobs was growing rapidly. Peoria architects Hewitt & Emerson designed the apartments; while the firm was known for its classically inspired designs, they produced a more modern design for the building. The building has a three-story mixed-use layout, with commercial space on the first floor and residential space on the upper two; unlike smaller mixed-use buildings, the apartments have internal corridors and common entrances for residents. It is the only building of its type remaining in downtown Peoria.

The building was added to the National Register of Historic Places on December 27, 2016.
