= Hotel Kewanee =

- Kewanee Hotel
- U.S. National Register of Historic Places
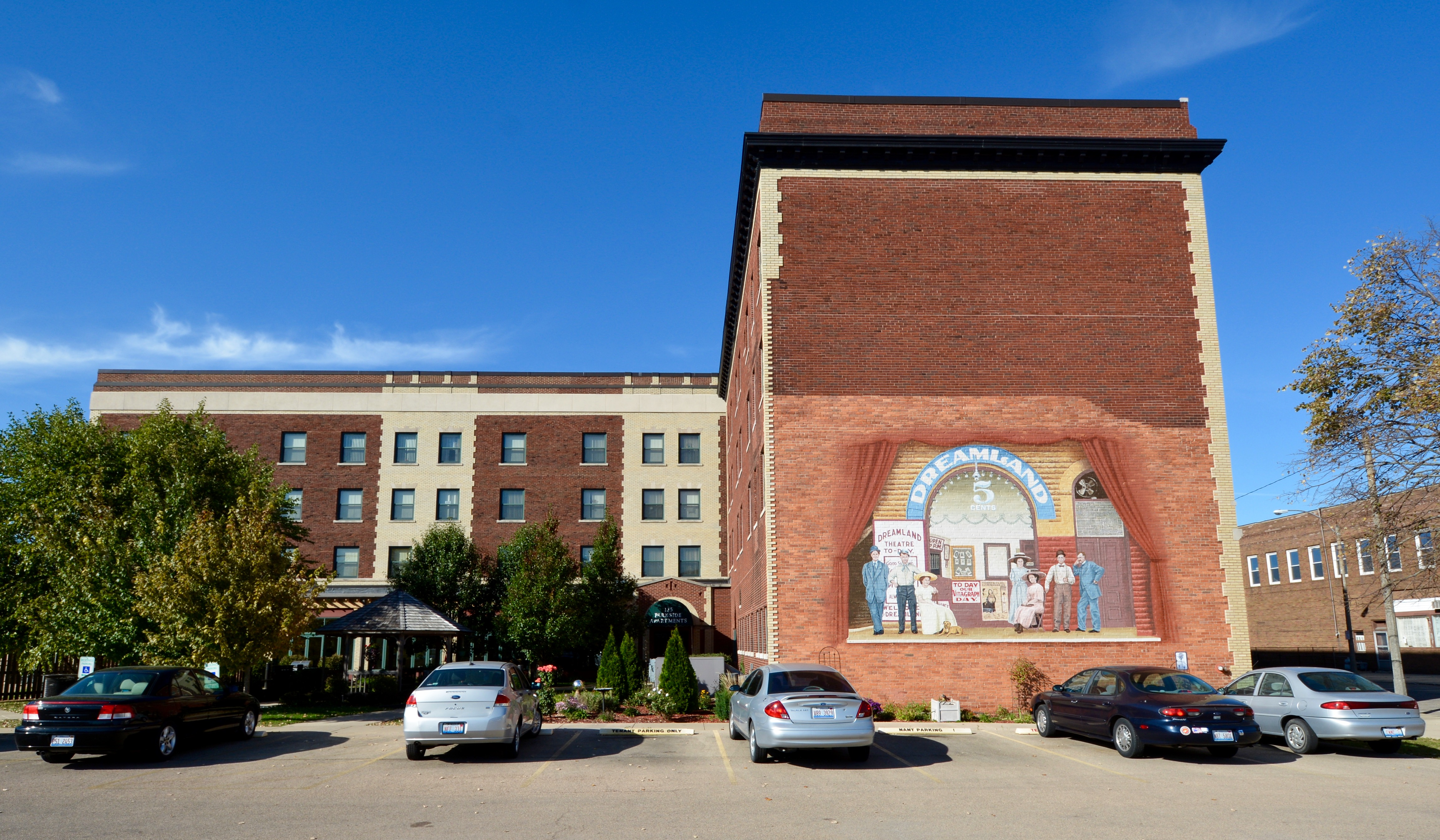

- Location within Illinois
- Location: 125 N. Chestnut St., Kewanee, Illinois
- Coordinates: 41°14′44″N 89°55′42″W
- Built: 1916
- Architect: Hewitt & Emerson; Gibson, B.K.
- Architectural style: Classical Revival
- NRHP reference No.: 05001605
- Added to NRHP: February 1, 2006

The Hotel Kewanee is a former hotel in downtown Kewanee, Illinois, located at 125 North Chestnut Street.

== History ==
The Hotel Kewanee was built in 1916. It is a four-story brick building, and during its heyday it featured over 100 guest rooms, a restaurant, a full bar, a lounge, a ballroom, and many local businesses in its storefronts on the ground floor. Peoria architects Hewitt & Emerson designed the building, which cost $150,000. At the time of its opening in 1916, it was known as The Parkside Hotel. This moniker lasted until the 1950s, when it was renamed The Hotel Kewanee following a major renovation.

Longtime proprietor Charlie Summers Sr. and his family owned and operated the hotel from 1962 to 1992. During this time, the hotel hosted a full-scale restaurant, bar, and lounge that were open to the public. It also hosted private functions in its ballroom until 1977, when the ballroom was replaced with additional hotel rooms. The Hotel Kewanee hosted many famous guests over the years, including: U.S. Senator Everett McKinley Dirksen (R-IL); Governor Richard Buell Ogilvie (D-IL); Maureen Reagan, daughter of President Ronald Reagan; Margaret Whiting, pop singer; Bob Crosby, bandleader and brother of actor Bing Crosby; Suzy Bogguss, country music singer; U.S. Senator John Tower (R-TX); and Marjabelle Young Stewart, author and etiquette expert.

WKEI, a Kewanee-based radio station, had its studios on the fourth floor of The Hotel Kewanee from 1961 to 1981.

In 2006, it was named to the National Register of Historic Places.

The Henry County Housing Authority acquired the building in the early 2000s. It has been renovated for use as senior citizen housing and was renamed Parkside Apartments.
