= Wyndham Springfield City Centre =

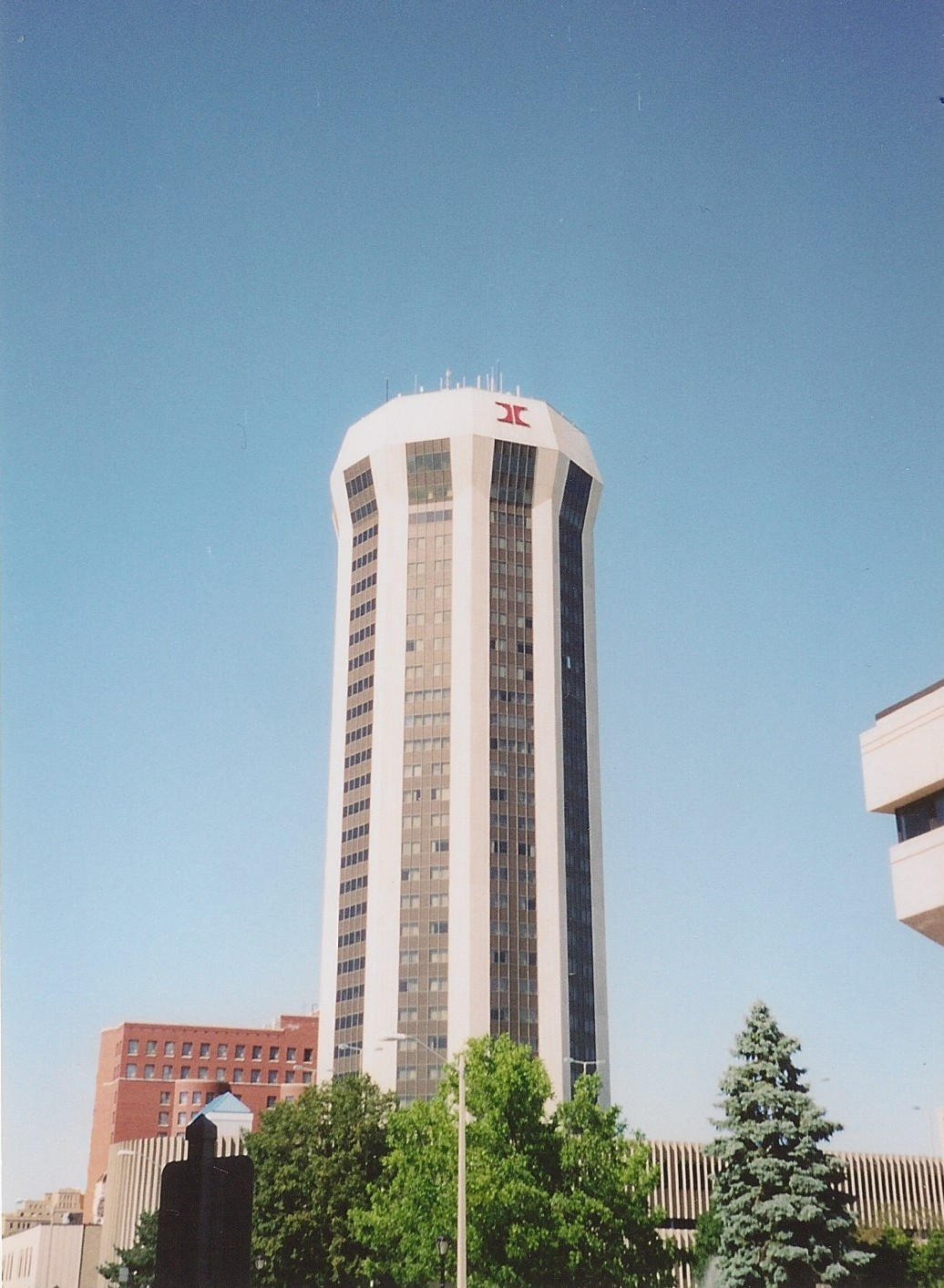
- Interactive map of the Wyndham Springfield City Centre area

General information
- Type: Hotel
- Location: Springfield, Illinois, United States
- Coordinates: 39.80015°N 89.64576°W
- Completed: 1974; 52 years ago

Height
- Roof: 352 ft (107 m)

Technical details
- Floor count: 30

Design and construction
- Architects: Architectural & Mechanical Systems Corporation

Other information
- Public transit: SMTD

The Wyndham Springfield City Centre is a shuttered hotel that closed in 2025. It is the tallest skyscraper in Springfield, Illinois and the tallest habitable building in Illinois outside of Chicago.

== History ==
The Forum 30 Plaza Hotel opened in 1974. It was renamed the Hilton Towers in 1980,, then later the Springfield Hilton and then the Hilton Springfield in 1998. It left Hilton on December 31, 2015 and became the Wyndham Springfield City Centre. The hotel closed due to water damage in March 2025. The empty building was listed for bankruptcy sale in August 2026.

== Building ==
The lower 15 floors are accessed by glass elevators with city views, while the upper 15 floors are accessed by interior elevators. Floor 30 has several panoramic, high-end restaurants and bars, with views of the city. It has a parking garage owned by the City of Springfield, connected to the tower by an underground concourse and a skybridge.

== Hotel levels ==
C | Concourse Level - Contains an indoor pool, fitness center, and meeting rooms. L | Ground/Lobby Level - Contains hotel lobby, shops, and meeting rooms. M | Main Level - Contains meeting rooms and connection to parking garage. 2–28 | Guestroom Levels 29 | Vista Level - Contains Vista Rooms meeting rooms with panoramic views. Can be reached by non-emergency stairs from level 30. Also contains restrooms for restaurants on level 30. 30 | Penthouse Level - Contains 2 separate restaurants with panoramic views.
