= Peoria Marriott Pere Marquette =

- Pere Marquette Hotel
- U.S. National Register of Historic Places
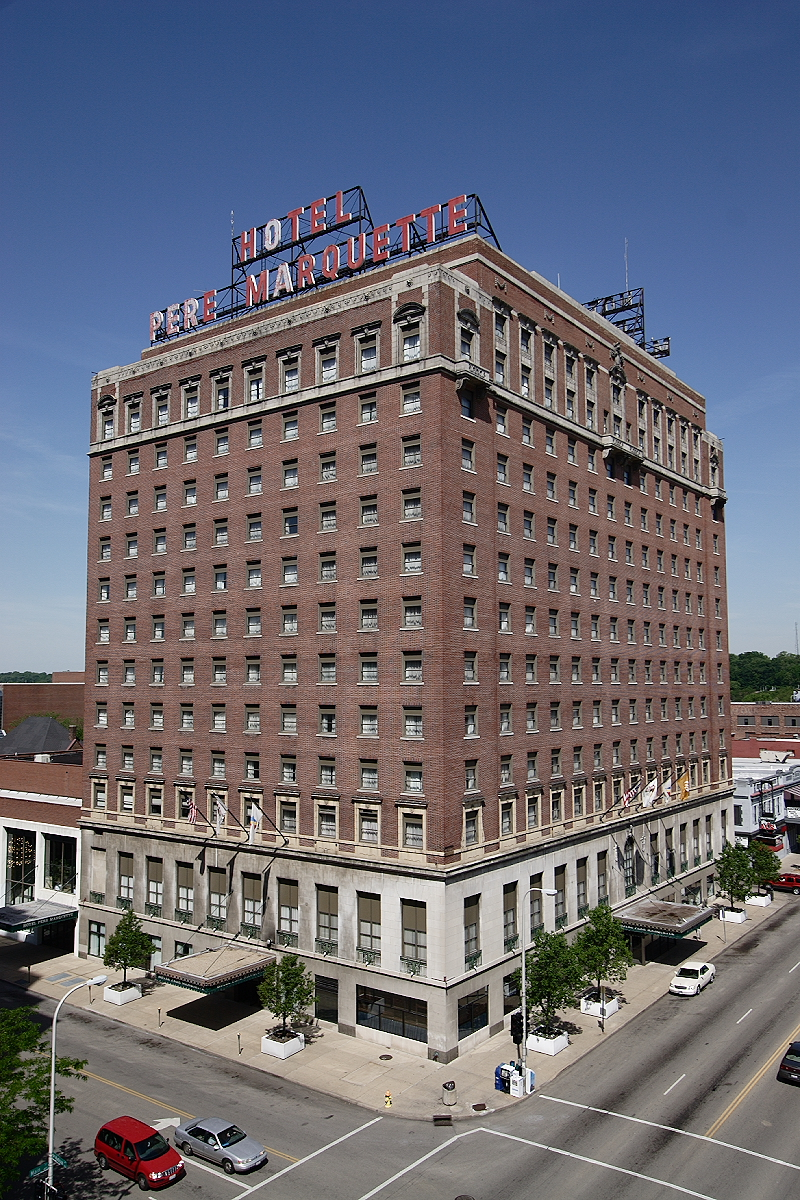
- 2006, from the east, prior to restoration

- Location within Peoria County, Illinois
- Location: Peoria, Peoria County, Illinois, USA
- Coordinates: 40°41′38″N 89°35′32″W
- Area: 1 acre (0.40 ha)
- Built: 1926
- Architect: Horace Trumbauer; Hewitt, Emerson & Gregg
- NRHP reference No.: 82002594
- Added to NRHP: August 12, 1982

The Peoria Marriott Pere Marquette, is a historic 14-story hotel in downtown Peoria, Illinois, United States. Built in 1926, the building is Peoria's only surviving example of an upscale 1920s hotel. It was listed on the National Register of Historic Places in 1982.

== Description ==
Philadelphia architect Horace Trumbauer was the lead architect for the hotel. Trumbauer designed many prominent homes and public buildings on the East Coast, including several upscale hotels; his design for the Père Marquette was inspired by both his earlier hotel designs and other contemporary hotels such as the Waldorf-Astoria. Herbert Edmund Hewitt, a prominent local architect responsible for many of Peoria's major buildings of the period, collaborated with Trumbauer on the project.

The fourteen-story building is mainly built from brick and stone. Its exterior design mainly emphasizes symmetry and linearity, a common architectural trend at the time. Stone window treatments surround the second-story windows, and a stone cornice with carved Native American and animal faces encircles the top of the building. The hotel is located directly across Main Street from the Madison Theatre building and a half-block from Peoria City Hall; both buildings are also on the National Register.

The original first floor included a grand lobby and three large meeting rooms. The Cotillion Room, the hotel's original ballroom, features a high domed ceiling, French window mirrors, and decorative plasterwork. The LaSalle Room and the Cheminee Lounge both originally featured high ceilings with crystal chandeliers, though the original crystal was removed from the Cheminee Lounge. The lobby and the Cotillion Room both originally had murals by George Matthews Harding; the lobby mural depicted Père Marquette landing at Peoria, while the Cotillion Room mural showed Sieur de La Salle leaving France. The hotel features 288 guest rooms.

== History ==
Planning for the hotel began in 1924, when several of Peoria's business leaders decided that the city needed a high-end hotel. Led by Emmet C. May, the business leaders enlisted hotel manager Horace Leland Wiggins to oversee the new hotel. A sweepstakes was held to choose the hotel's name; the winning entry, Hotel Père Marquette, a common name for Father Jacques Marquette, received $50. The hotel was completed in 1926 for $2.5 million (now $45 million after inflation), and its grand opening was held in January 1927. 16,000 people came to the grand opening. The building's designers were primarily from the East Coast, and the hotel was heavily influenced by the luxurious hotels that were popular there in the 1920s. It was one of two major high-end hotels in Peoria at the time, along with the Jefferson Hotel, and is now the only one still operating.

Renovations took place in 1954, 1961 and again in 1972 when the Père Marquette joined the Hilton Hotel chain as the Peoria Hilton. Further renovation and restoration were undertaken in 1981. The hotel later left the Hilton chain and reverted to its original name. On August 12, 1982, the hotel was added to the National Register of Historic Places.

The Peoria City Council approved the final agreement with developer Gary Matthews to close the hotel for an extensive renovation and expansion into a full-service, upscale Marriott hotel. The hotel closed December 2, 2011 to begin these renovations and reopened in June 2013.

A 2020 indictment alleged that Matthews and Monte J. Brannan on charges of money laundering and mail fraud, including using investor funds to enrich themselves from 2008 to 2018. The trial began in October 2023; both developers were jointly charged with five counts of mail fraud and 13 counts of money laundering.

The hotel was renovated again in 2022.
