= Downtown Peoria Historic District =

Historic district in Illinois, United States

- U.S. National Register of Historic Places
- U.S. Historic district
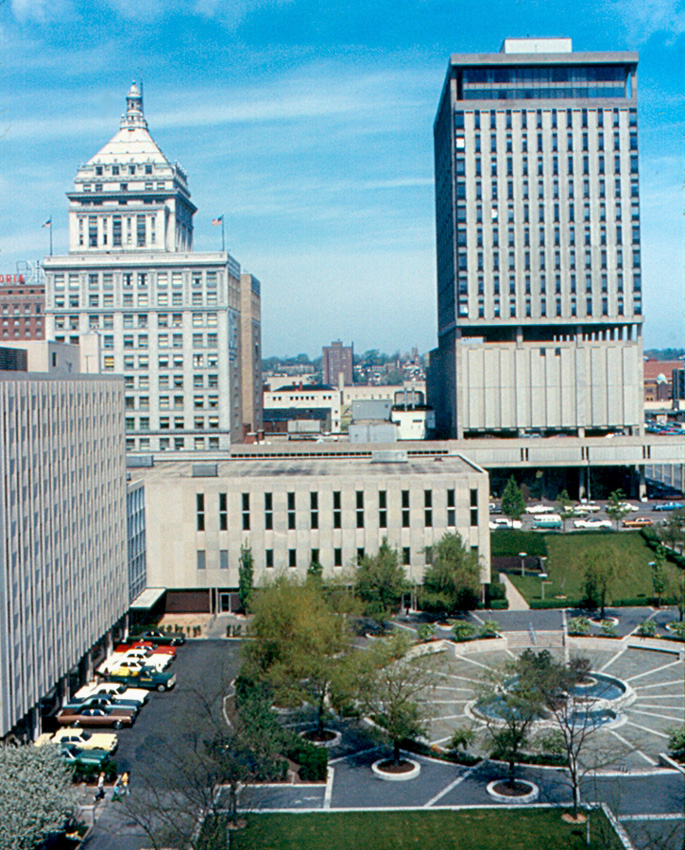
- Downtown Peoria in 1973, with Courthouse Square in the foreground

- Location within Illinois Location within the United States
- Location: Roughly between N William Kumpf Blvd., Perry Ave., Fulton, Fayette & Water Sts., Peoria, Illinois
- Coordinates: 40°41′34″N 89°35′26″W
- Area: 77.1 acres (31.2 ha)
- NRHP reference No.: 100002825
- Added to NRHP: December 10, 2018

The Downtown Peoria Historic District is a commercial historic district encompassing seventeen city blocks in downtown Peoria, Illinois. The district's buildings reflect Peoria's development as an industrial center and major Illinois city. While Peoria was platted in the 1820s, the oldest buildings in the district date from 1867, shortly before Peoria's economic boom of the 1870s. In the late nineteenth century, Peoria's whiskey industry was among the largest in the world, and many downtown civic improvements and public buildings were funded by whiskey profits. By the turn of the twentieth century, another economic boom brought a large retail district to downtown Peoria; many of the department stores from this period still stand in the district. An urban renewal project in the mid-twentieth century brought several Modernist skyscrapers to downtown Peoria as well, including the Caterpillar administration building, the DeKroff Metz and Company Building, and the First Federal Savings Tower.

The district was added to the National Register of Historic Places on December 10, 2018.
