= Hazen and Robinson =

Hazen and Robinson was an architecture firm that practiced in Lincoln, Nebraska, from 1947 to 1967. N. Bruce Hazen and Marvin Robinson were the two principle architects and founders of the firm. Together they created buildings that till this day shape the landscape of downtown Lincoln Nebraska, the Nebraska State Capitol, and the University of Nebraska–Lincoln, one of the largest universities in the American Midwest. Additionally, they did many historic home districts in Lincoln. The firms’ modernist approach to design was reflected in their design. This is most noticeable in their partnership with Philip Johnson on the Sheldon Art Gallery, and other buildings including Kimball Recital Hall, Westbrook Music Building and Pershing Auditorium.

== N. Bruce Hazen ==
N. Bruce Hazen was born in Peoria, Illinois on March 13, 1897, to his mother, Elisha Brewster Hazen-Agnes McGill. He attended Peoria High School, and studied at Bradley Polytechnic Institute (Bradly University) from 1915-1917. He continued his education at the University of Pennsylvania until 1918, where he then joined the United States Navy to fight in World War I. He returned to Illinois in 1919 to earn a B.A. in Architecture from the University of Illinois, and graduated in 1922. While attending he was a part of the Delta Sigma Phi fraternity.

Bruce Hazen began his career working as a draftsman for JW Roy Urbana III from 1919 to 1921. In 1922, Hazen began work at the Peoria-based firm Hewitt & Emerson. Hazen then moved to Lincoln, Nebraska where he worked as an architect and draftsman for Davis & Wilson.

Hazen's most important work early in his career was his involvement in the Woodshire development in Lincoln, Nebraska. Hazen was the most prolific architect of the Woodsshire development and has ten home designs to his credit during that time. Although his firm was later known for modernism, he designed in a variety of period revival styles, including the popular Colonial Revival.

He married Sidna Nutting Smith on the 26th of June, 1937. Hazen was known to have hobbies of gardening, stamp collecting, and hunting. He retired from architecture in 1976. Bruce Hazen died on May 23, 1991.

== Marvin Robinson ==
Marvin Lee Robinson had a position on the board of directors of the Nebraska Art Association, and was a former president of the Nebraska chapter of American Institute of Architects. Robinson was a Lowell Palmer Fellow in Architecture at Princeton University. Robinson retired from architecture in 1967, and died in 1970.

== Hazen and Robinson (1947- 1967) ==
Hazen and Robinson was founded in 1947 in Lincoln, Nebraska. The firm was one of the most prominent architectural firms in Nebraska in the immediate time post World War II. Hazen and Robinson amassed a large portfolio of work around Lincoln and southeast Nebraska. The architecture that they produced was mostly considered modern. After their work with Philip Johnson at the Sheldon Art Gallery, they also completed some projects in the International Style, which Johnson was famous for. They practiced until 1967 when Marvin Robinson retired. After that, Bruce Hazen practiced with some local architects until his retirement in 1976.

== Notable work ==
Hazen and Robinson's most notable impact was on the campus of the University of Nebraska. They are credited with the design of the Kimball Recital Hall, Westbrook Music Building, Woods Art Building, and the Canfield Administration building. They also worked directly with Philip Johnson on constructing the Sheldon Museum of Art, which is also located at the University of Nebraska. It is considered one of the architects most accomplished projects, in the vein of modernism informed by classicism. Through their collaboration with Johnson they drew inspiration from his work while designing the Woods Art Building, located adjacent to the Sheldon. After the completion of the Woods Art Building, Hazen and Robinson also were contributing architects on the sculpture garden between the Woods and Sheldon. They completed their major contribution the campus’s art quad by designing the Kimball Recital Hall and the Westbrook Music Hall. The Kimball’s design is an acoustical marvel to this day.

Hazen and Robin was one of 15 architectural and engineering firms that partnered in the design of the Pershing Auditorium in downtown Lincoln. they also designed the Bennett Martin Public Library in downtown Lincoln. One of their most notable works outside of Lincoln was their design of the Beatrice State Hospital, in Beatrice, Nebraska.
