= Health Education Building =

- U.S. National Register of Historic Places
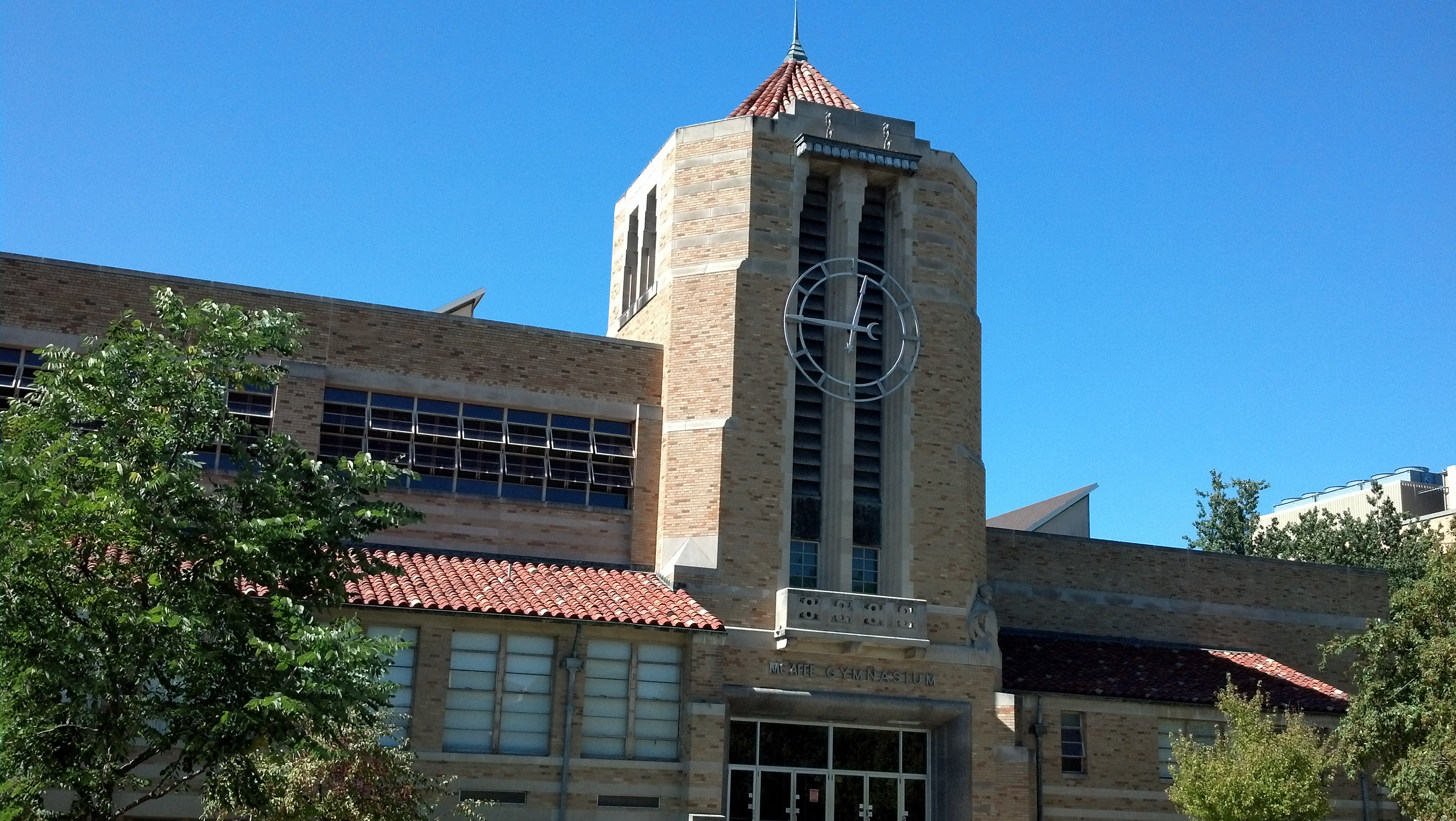

- Location within Illinois Location within the United States
- Location: 1611 4th St., Charleston, Illinois
- Coordinates: 39°28′54″N 88°10′35″W
- Area: less than one acre
- Built: 1938; 88 years ago
- Architect: Hewitt, Emerson & Gregg; C. Herrick Hammond
- Architectural style: Art Deco, Moderne, International Style
- NRHP reference No.: 95000993
- Added to NRHP: August 9, 1995

The Health Education Building, also known as the McAfee Gym, is a historic building located on the campus of Eastern Illinois University in Charleston, Illinois. The building was constructed in 1938 and designed by Peoria architecture firm Hewitt, Emerson & Gregg; C. Herrick Hammond served as the state's supervising architect on the project. The building's design incorporates elements of several contemporary architectural styles; it features an Art Deco octagonal clock tower and projecting pilasters, while its flat roof and concrete coursing are representative of the Art Moderne style and its steel ribbon windows are inspired by the International Style. The university used the new building to expand its physical education program into a full course of study, which included the establishment of a women's physical education program. The building was also used to host sporting events, student performances, and school dances. In the 1960s, the construction of Lantz Arena and a new classroom building for health education resulted in the relocation of many of the programs held in the building. The building was officially renamed the Florence McAfee Women's Gymnasium in 1965, after the first head of women's athletics at the university.

The building was added to the National Register of Historic Places on August 9, 1995.
