= Robert Holloway =

New Zealand cricketer

Bob Holloway
Personal information
- Full name: Robert Alexander Holloway
- Born: 15 November 1940 (age 85); Invercargill, New Zealand
- Batting: Right-handed
- Role: Opening batsman

Domestic team information
- Years: Team
- 1961/62–1964/65: Otago
- FC debut: 25 December 1961 Otago v Wellington
- Last FC: 5 February 1965 Otago v Wellington

Career statistics
Competition	First-class
Matches	15
Runs scored	373
Batting average	13.81
100s/50s	0/2
Top score	61*
Catches/stumpings	5/–
- Source: ESPN CricInfo, 11 September 2022

Robert Alexander Holloway (born 15 November 1940) is a New Zealand former cricketer. He played 15 first-class matches, including 14 for Otago in the Plunket Shield, during the 1960s as an opening batsman. A good club batsman who is considered to have not fulfilled his potential in representative cricket, Holloway also played for Southland in the Hawke Cup.

== Early life ==
Holloway was born at Invercargill in 1940 and was educated at Southland Boys' High School in the city. In his final two years at school, Holloway was a prefect and served as a sergeant in the school's cadet force. He won academic honours at school and was a member of several school sports teams, playing in the rugby union XV, cricket XI, and basketball team. A tall man, he played rugby as a flank forward and was described as a "rugged, fiery forward" who was the school's "main lineout forward".

As a cricketer, Holloway often played at school as an opening batsman. He played for the school's first XI for four years and in his final year he was described as "the most powerful batsman in the team". He was also a useful leg spin bowler―against Otago Boys' High School he took four wickets for 43 runs from 35 overs and was described as an "outstanding" bowler. As a batsman, he was "a player of great concentration and determination". His straight drive was a particular strength, and he was selected for both Southland's and Otago's Brabin Shield teams whilst at school (Note: The Brabin Shield was a competition for under-20 teams from the major New Zealand representative teams.) as well as the senior Southland team.

== Senior cricket ==
Holloway played in Otago's Brabin Shield team for three seasons from the 1958–59 season. A "courageous knock" against Canterbury's under-20 team at the end of 1958 was noted by The Press, and he "scored well", making 73 runs against the Wellington team, in the 1959–60 tournament. In early 1960 he was one of Southland's top scorers against Canterbury B, (Note: Southland were not a first-class team at the time Holloway played for them and did not compete in the Plunket Shield.) having first "saved the day" in a first-innings stand of 45 for the eighth-wicket. He played in the Hawke Cup for Southland at the beginning of December 1960 and was again in Otago's Brabin Shield team for the season―both his leg-spin bowling and "attractive" batting in a partnership of 81 drawing attention at the end of the month― although he missed out on selection for a representative Brabin team in January 1961 due to injury.

In club cricket Holloway played for North East Valley Cricket Club in Dunedin. He and Bert Sutcliffe, who scored 125 not out, put on an unbroken first-wicket stand of 200 in a club match in October 1960, Holloway scoring 71 not out. (Note: Sutcliffe was a key part of the Otago representative team and played 42 Test matches for New Zealand between 1947 and 1965.) He later played for Union Cricket Club in Invercargill and had a reputation as a "prolific" and consistent run scorer in club cricket.

With four of Otago's team touring South Africa with the New Zealand national team, Holloway was one of seven debutants when he was named in the representative team for the first time in December 1961. Opening the batting on Christmas Day against Wellington, he scored 21 runs in his first first-class innings in Otago's first Plunket Shield match of the 1961–62 season. According to The Press, he "played dourly but commendably in the circumstances" as Otago were dismissed for a score of 79 with only Holloway and Sutcliffe, who scored 22, batting with any "resistance". He went on to play in two more Shield matches over the Christmas and New Years period against Auckland and Northern Districts, but during the last match injured his ankle whilst fielding and was unavailable for the matches against Canterbury and Central Districts later in January, (Note: At the time, each representative team played five Plunket Shield matches each season.) although he did play in a non-first-class match for Southland against Fiji during the month.

The following season Holloway played in all five of Otago's Plunket Shield matches, opening the batting in each match and scoring a total of 160 runs. He made 27 runs in the team's first match of the season but was run out "in a disastrous way" just as he was "getting on top of the bowling". In the second match of the 1962–63 season he carried his bat for 61 not out in a total of 122 against Central Districts, becoming the third Otago player to do so. (Note: As of 2016, Holloway was one of seven batsmen to carry their bat playing for Otago.) This innings was his first half-century and remained his highest first-class score. He batted "very solidly" according to The Press, and was one of only two Otago batsmen to reach double-figures in their first innings.

Otago did not win a match in 1962–63, (Note: In the four seasons Holloway played first-class cricket Otago did not win a match in the Plunket Shield. He played in 14 of the team's 20 matches during that period.) but The Press considered that if their younger players, including Holloway, who it described as "a sturdy opening bat", continued to develop that they were likely to improve with time. Holloway was selected to play against the touring MCC team, (Note: The MCC team was the English Test match team. During the period in which Holloway played, England toured under the MCC name and played as MCC in all matches other than Test matches. The touring team played three Test matches in New Zealand on a tour which also saw them visit Australia to play an Ashes series ahead of the New Zealand leg of the tour.) featuring in an Otago Invitational XI in March 1963. (Note: The match was the only non-Test match the touring team played in New Zealand. Otago included two players from Northern Districts and two from Canterbury to strengthen the team for the match.) Opening once more, he scored just five runs in the match.

Holloway played in all five of Otago's matches in 1963–64, scoring a total of 147 runs. He started well with a half-century in the team's first match of the season and a score of 46 in the second against Northern Districts, but Otago again failed to win a match. The team did, however, take batting points in the match against Northern Districts―their first points of any kind since the 1961–62 season―after Holloway was part of an "excellent" top-order batting performance. (Note: Batting points were awarded when a match was drawn for outscoring the opposition in the team's respective first innings. The match was effected by rain and was unable to be completed.)

The last first-class match Holloway played was the following season. He was called into the Otago team for the final match of the season after captain Jack Alabaster was dropped. Batting at number three, he was out for a duck in his first innings and scored 13 in the second. Later in the month he was in the Southland Hawke Cup team that played Central Otago and the following season played against Manawatu in the same competition.

In total Holloway played in 15 first-class matches and scored 373 runs with two half-centuries; his batting average was just 13.81 runs per innings. He played "off the front foot" and was considered a particularly strong driver of the ball. Although he was considered a fine club batsman and effective medium-pace change bowler, The Press considered that he "never fulfilled the promise he showed as a youngster". He played his final Hawke Cup match for Southland in January 1968, having played against the touring Fijians earlier in the same month.

== Later life ==
Holloway moved to Christchurch in 1968. He played club cricket with Riccarton Cricket Club in the city, scoring a half-century on debut for the team. He worked for the Farmer's Co-operative Insurance Association. He served on the executive committee of the Old Boys' Association of Southland Boys' High School during the 1970s.
