= Mackinaw Township =

Mackinaw Township may refer to the following places in the United States:

- Mackinaw Township, Tazewell County, Illinois
- Little Mackinaw Township, Tazewell County, Illinois
- Mackinaw Township, Michigan
