= Tazewell County, Illinois =

County in Illinois, United States

- County
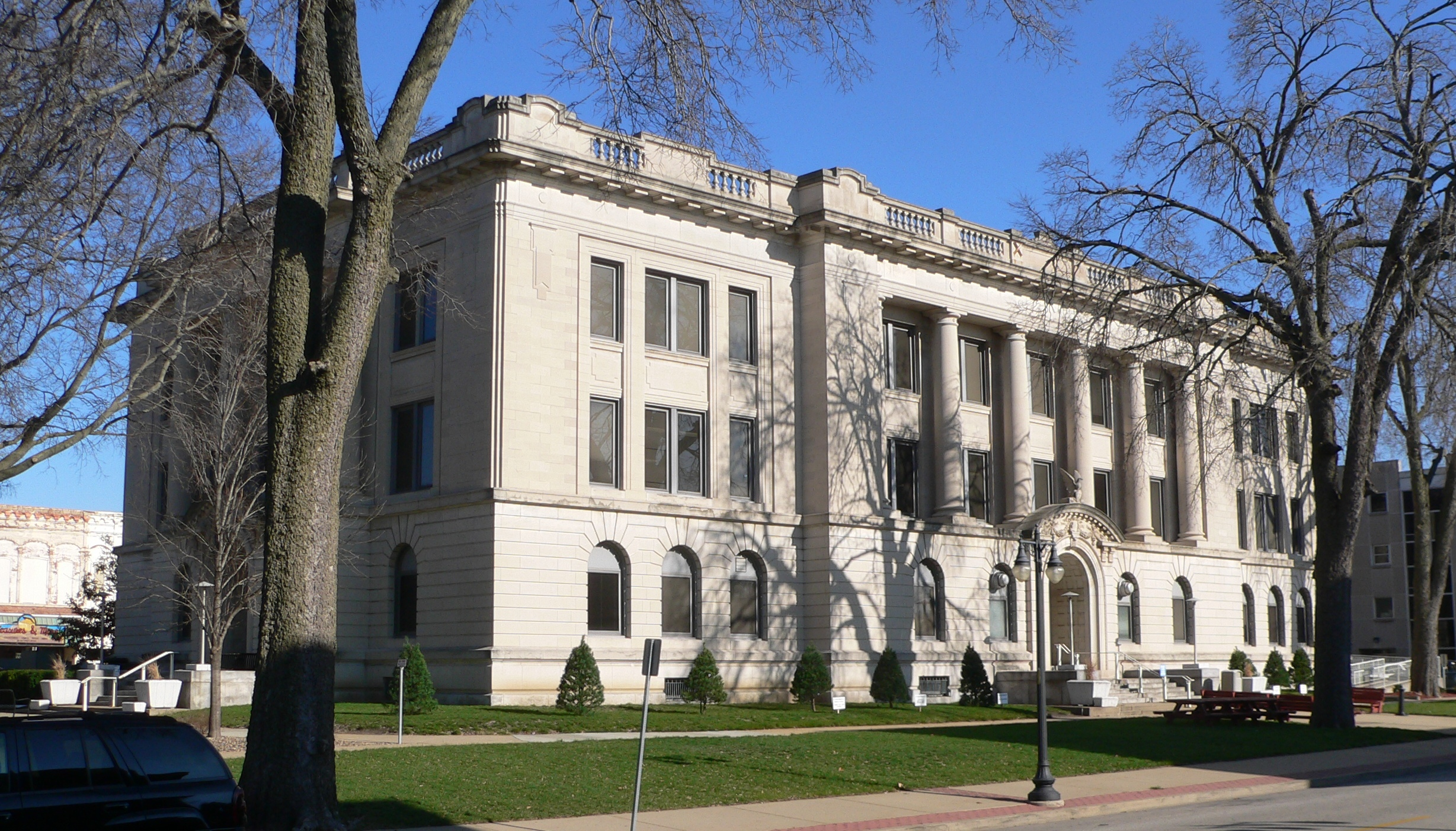
- Tazewell County Courthouse in Pekin

- Seal

- Location within the U.S. state of Illinois
- Coordinates: 40°31′N 89°31′W
- Country: United States
- State: Illinois
- Founded: 1827
- Named for: Littleton Waller Tazewell
- Seat: Pekin
- Largest city: Pekin

Area
  - Total: 658 sq mi (1,700 km^{2})
  - Land: 649 sq mi (1,680 km^{2})
  - Water: 9.0 sq mi (23 km^{2}) 1.4%

Population (2020)
  - Total: 131,343
  - Estimate (2025): 130,049 ▼
  - Density: 202/sq mi (78.1/km^{2})
- Time zone: UTC−6 (Central)
  - Summer (DST): UTC−5 (CDT)
- Congressional districts: 16th, 17th
- Website: tazewell-il.gov

Tazewell County (/ˈtæzwɛl/ TAZZ-wel) is located in the U.S. state of Illinois. According to the 2020 census, it had a population of 131,343. Its county seat and largest city is Pekin.

Tazewell County is part of the Peoria metropolitan area. The majority of the population lives along the county's western border.

== History ==
Tazewell County was formed out of Peoria County in 1827. The consensus appears to be that it was named in honor of Littleton Tazewell, who served in the U.S. Senate, and who became Governor of Virginia in 1834. It is, however, possible that it was named after Littleton's father, prominent Virginia politician Henry Tazewell, after whom Tazewell County, Virginia, was named.

The first county seat was in Mackinaw from 1827 to 1836. It was moved temporarily from Mackinaw to Pekin in June 1831, with the county court proceedings in the Snell schoolhouse. It moved to Tremont in 1836. After a political struggle between Tremont and Pekin, the county seat was reassigned to Pekin in 1849.

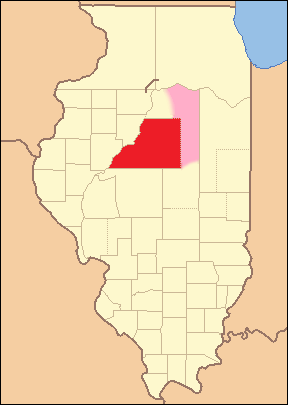
Tazewell from the time of its creation to 1829, including a large tract of unorganized territory temporarily attached to it, whose precise border was not defined.

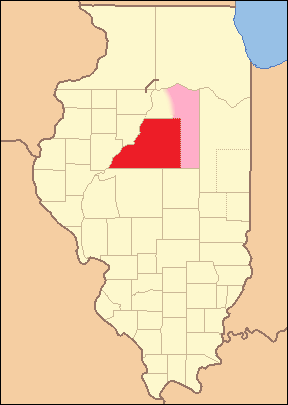
Tazewell County between 1829 and 1830: the creation of Mason County established a southern border for Tazewell's additional territory.

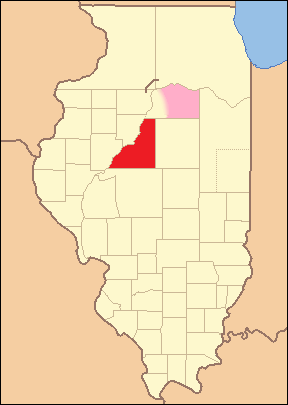
Tazewell County between 1830 and 1831: the additional territory to the east became McLean County.

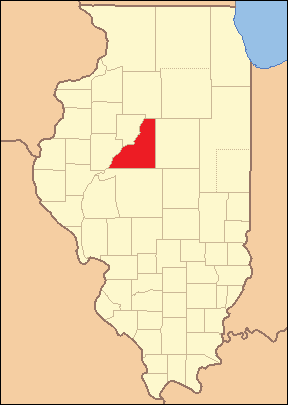
Tazewell County between 1831 and 1841: the last of the county's additional territory became part of LaSalle County.

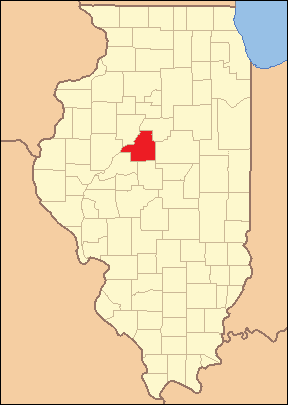
Tazewell County in 1841, reduced to its present borders.

== Geography ==
According to the U.S. Census Bureau, the county has a total area of 658 square miles (1,700 km^{2}), of which 649 square miles (1,680 km^{2}) is land and 9.0 square miles (23 km^{2}) (1.4%) is water.

=== State Fish & Wildlife Areas ===
The following Illinois State Park & Natural Areas are located in Tazewell County:

- Spring Lake State Fish and Wildlife Area - an 8.5-mile (13.7 km) long alluvial lake that lies parallel to the Illinois River.
- Powerton Lake State Fish and Wildlife Area - 1,426-acre (577 ha) area of semi-protected habitat on the Illinois River.
- Mackinaw River State Fish and Wildlife Area - 1,448-acre (586 ha) state park

=== Climate and weather ===
Pekin, Illinois

Climate chart (precipitation, max. and min. temperature)
J	F	M	A	M	J	J	A	S	O	N	D
1.5 31 14	1.7 37 20	2.8 49 30	3.6 62 40	4.2 73 51	3.8 82 60	4 86 65	3.2 84 63	3.1 77 54	2.8 64 42	3 49 31	2.4 35 20
- █ Average max. and min. temperatures in °F
- █ Precipitation totals in inches
- Source: The Weather Channel
Metric conversion
J	F	M	A	M	J	J	A	S	O	N	D
38 −1 −10	42 3 −7	72 9 −1	90 17 4	106 23 11	98 28 16	102 30 18	80 29 17	79 25 12	70 18 6	76 9 −1	61 2 −7
- █ Average max. and min. temperatures in °C
- █ Precipitation totals in mm

In recent years, average temperatures in the county seat of Pekin have ranged from a low of 14 °F (−10 °C) in January to a high of 86 °F (30 °C) in July, although a record low of −27 °F (−33 °C) was recorded in January 1884 and a record high of 113 °F (45 °C) was recorded in July 1936. Average monthly precipitation ranged from 1.50 inches (38 mm) in January to 4.17 inches (106 mm) in May.

=== Adjacent counties ===
- Peoria County (northwest)
- Woodford County (north)
- McLean County (east)
- Logan County (south)
- Mason County (southwest)
- Fulton County (west)

== Transportation ==
=== Major highways ===
- I-74
- I-155
- I-474
- US 24
- US 150
- IL 8
- IL 9
- IL 26
- IL 29
- IL 40
- IL 98
- IL 116
- IL 122

=== Airports ===
The following public-use airports are located in Tazewell County:

- Pekin Municipal Airport (C15) - serves Pekin (Located by the Village of South Pekin, Illinois)
- Manito Mitchell Airport (C45) - serves Manito, a village in Mason County

=== Public Transportation ===
Bus and paratransit service in Tazewell County is provided by Peoria's “CityLink” system, operating six routes (four originating from Peoria) seven days a week.

== Demographics ==
Historical population
Census	Pop.	Note	%±
1830	4,716		—
1840	7,221		53.1%
1850	12,052		66.9%
1860	21,470		78.1%
1870	27,903		30.0%
1880	29,666		6.3%
1890	29,556		−0.4%
1900	33,221		12.4%
1910	34,027		2.4%
1920	38,540		13.3%
1930	46,082		19.6%
1940	58,362		26.6%
1950	76,165		30.5%
1960	99,789		31.0%
1970	118,649		18.9%
1980	132,078		11.3%
1990	123,692		−6.3%
2000	128,485		3.9%
2010	135,394		5.4%
2020	131,343		−3.0%
2025 (est.)	130,049	▼	−1.0%
U.S. Decennial Census; 1790-1960 1900-1990; 1990-2000 2010

=== 2020 census ===
As of the 2020 census, the county had a population of 131,343. The median age was 41.9 years. 22.7% of residents were under the age of 18 and 19.8% of residents were 65 years of age or older. For every 100 females there were 97.3 males, and for every 100 females age 18 and over there were 95.1 males age 18 and over.

The racial makeup of the county was 92.2% White, 1.3% Black or African American, 0.3% American Indian and Alaska Native, 0.8% Asian, <0.1% Native Hawaiian and Pacific Islander, 0.7% from some other race, and 4.7% from two or more races. Hispanic or Latino residents of any race comprised 2.4% of the population.

78.2% of residents lived in urban areas, while 21.8% lived in rural areas.

There were 53,985 households in the county, of which 28.7% had children under the age of 18 living in them. Of all households, 50.0% were married-couple households, 17.5% were households with a male householder and no spouse or partner present, and 25.4% were households with a female householder and no spouse or partner present. About 29.1% of all households were made up of individuals and 13.8% had someone living alone who was 65 years of age or older.

There were 58,550 housing units, of which 7.8% were vacant. Among occupied housing units, 75.7% were owner-occupied and 24.3% were renter-occupied. The homeowner vacancy rate was 2.3% and the rental vacancy rate was 10.7%.

=== Racial and ethnic composition ===
Tazewell County, Illinois – Racial and ethnic composition Note: the US Census treats Hispanic/Latino as an ethnic category. This table excludes Latinos from the racial categories and assigns them to a separate category. Hispanics/Latinos may be of any race.
Race / Ethnicity (NH = Non-Hispanic)	Pop 1980	Pop 1990	Pop 2000	Pop 2010	Pop 2020	% 1980	% 1990	% 2000	% 2010	% 2020
White alone (NH)	130,406	122,037	124,270	128,625	119,882	98.73%	98.66%	96.72%	95.00%	91.27%
Black or African American alone (NH)	203	183	1,115	1,351	1,629	0.15%	0.15%	0.87%	1.00%	1.24%
Native American or Alaska Native alone (NH)	180	213	293	307	279	0.14%	0.17%	0.23%	0.23%	0.21%
Asian alone (NH)	404	423	654	990	1,080	0.31%	0.34%	0.51%	0.73%	0.82%
Native Hawaiian or Pacific Islander alone (NH)	x	x	9	30	41	x	x	0.01%	0.02%	0.03%
Other race alone (NH)	77	11	35	122	324	0.06%	0.01%	0.03%	0.09%	0.25%
Mixed race or Multiracial (NH)	x	x	778	1,455	4,947	x	x	0.61%	1.07%	3.77%
Hispanic or Latino (any race)	808	825	1,331	2,514	3,161	0.61%	0.67%	1.04%	1.86%	2.41%
Total	132,078	123,692	128,485	135,394	131,343	100.00%	100.00%	100.00%	100.00%	100.00%

As of the 2010 United States census, there were 135,394 people, 54,146 households, and 37,163 families living in the county. The population density was 208.6 inhabitants per square mile (80.5/km^{2}). There were 57,516 housing units at an average density of 88.6 per square mile (34.2/km^{2}). The racial makeup of the county was 96.2% white, 1.0% black or African American, 0.7% Asian, 0.3% American Indian, 0.5% from other races, and 1.3% from two or more races. Those of Hispanic or Latino origin made up 1.9% of the population. In terms of ancestry, 35.6% were German, 15.6% were American, 14.4% were Irish, and 12.0% were English.

Of the 54,146 households, 31.4% had children under the age of 18 living with them, 54.2% were married couples living together, 10.2% had a female householder with no husband present, 31.4% were non-families, and 26.3% of all households were made up of individuals. The average household size was 2.45 and the average family size was 2.94. The median age was 39.8 years.

The median income for a household in the county was $54,232 and the median income for a family was $66,764. Males had a median income of $50,372 versus $34,747 for females. The per capita income for the county was $27,036. About 6.3% of families and 7.9% of the population were below the poverty line, including 11.2% of those under age 18 and 4.5% of those age 65 or over.

== Communities ==
=== Cities ===
- Delavan
- East Peoria
- Marquette Heights
- Pekin (seat)
- Washington

=== Villages ===
- Creve Coeur
- Deer Creek (partly in Woodford County)
- Hopedale
- Mackinaw
- Minier
- Morton
- North Pekin
- Tremont

=== Census-designated place ===
- Heritage Lake

=== Other unincorporated communities ===
- Groveland
- Schaeferville

=== Townships ===
Tazewell County is divided into these townships:

- Deer Creek
- Delavan
- Elm Grove
- Groveland
- Hittle
- Hopedale
- Little Mackinaw
- Mackinaw
- Morton
- Pekin
- Tremont
- Washington

== Politics ==
Tazewell County has been solidly Republican on the national level, voting for the Republican candidate for U.S. president since 1996 and in all but two elections since 1952.

For the purposes of Illinois law, as of the 2022 general primary election, the three established political parties in the county are the Democratic Party, the Republican Party, and the Libertarian Party as all have received 5% or greater of the vote in a recent election. A relative rarity, Tazewell is one of only five counties where the Libertarian Party was an established political party in 2022. The Libertarian Party's established political party status allows it to have the same reduced barriers to ballot access as the Democratic and Republican parties and to hold primary elections. In the 2022 primary, 20 voters requested a Libertarian primary ballot.

United States presidential election results for Tazewell County, Illinois
Year	Republican		Democratic		Third party(ies)	
Year	No.	%	No.	%	No.	%
1892	3,030	43.63%	3,652	52.59%	262	3.77%
1896	3,703	48.72%	3,743	49.24%	155	2.04%
1900	3,957	48.05%	4,048	49.16%	230	2.79%
1904	4,051	52.41%	3,255	42.11%	423	5.47%
1908	3,767	47.55%	3,786	47.78%	370	4.67%
1912	2,500	32.40%	3,654	47.35%	1,563	20.25%
1916	6,672	47.56%	6,743	48.07%	613	4.37%
1920	7,679	62.69%	3,640	29.71%	931	7.60%
1924	7,488	52.11%	3,375	23.49%	3,507	24.41%
1928	9,409	56.73%	6,910	41.66%	267	1.61%
1932	7,260	34.48%	13,591	64.55%	204	0.97%
1936	7,946	32.07%	16,487	66.55%	341	1.38%
1940	12,419	41.18%	17,624	58.44%	116	0.38%
1944	12,531	46.34%	14,412	53.30%	96	0.36%
1948	12,504	46.70%	14,131	52.77%	143	0.53%
1952	20,763	55.14%	16,862	44.78%	28	0.07%
1956	23,690	59.27%	16,230	40.61%	50	0.13%
1960	23,967	53.83%	20,521	46.09%	38	0.09%
1964	17,170	37.55%	28,561	62.45%	0	0.00%
1968	22,971	47.44%	20,712	42.77%	4,739	9.79%
1972	31,937	67.08%	15,576	32.71%	100	0.21%
1976	28,951	55.14%	22,821	43.47%	731	1.39%
1980	35,481	62.84%	16,924	29.97%	4,057	7.19%
1984	33,782	59.15%	23,095	40.44%	238	0.42%
1988	28,861	53.72%	24,603	45.79%	263	0.49%
1992	23,469	39.12%	26,428	44.05%	10,097	16.83%
1996	24,395	45.45%	24,139	44.97%	5,144	9.58%
2000	31,537	54.05%	25,379	43.50%	1,432	2.45%
2004	36,058	57.84%	25,814	41.41%	466	0.75%
2008	33,247	51.90%	29,384	45.87%	1,429	2.23%
2012	35,335	57.66%	24,438	39.88%	1,509	2.46%
2016	38,707	59.78%	20,685	31.95%	5,359	8.28%
2020	42,513	61.37%	24,819	35.83%	1,944	2.81%
2024	42,451	62.02%	24,325	35.54%	1,666	2.43%

== Education ==
K-12 school districts include:

- Deer Creek-Mackinaw Community Unit School District 701
- Delavan Community Unit School District 703
- Eureka Community Unit District 140
- Illini Central Community Unit School District 189
- Hartsburg-Emden Community Unit School District 21
- Midwest Central Community Unit School District 191
- Morton Community Unit School District 709
- Olympia Community Unit School District 16
- Tremont Community Unit School District 702

Secondary school districts include:

- East Peoria Community High School District 309
- Pekin Community High School District 303
- Washington Community High School District 308

Elementary school districts include:

- Central School District 51
- Creve Coeur School District 76
- District 50 Schools
- East Peoria School District 86
- North Pekin-Marquette Heights School District 102
- Pekin Public School District 108
- Rankin Community School District 98
- Robein School District 85
- South Pekin School District 137
- Spring Lake Community Consolidated School District 606
- Washington School District 52

== See also ==
- National Register of Historic Places listings in Tazewell County, Illinois

== Notable people ==
- Everett Dirkson US Senator
- Gary Richrath, Lead Guitarist - REO Speedwagon
- John Theodore McNaughton, Government Official
