= East Peoria Community High School =

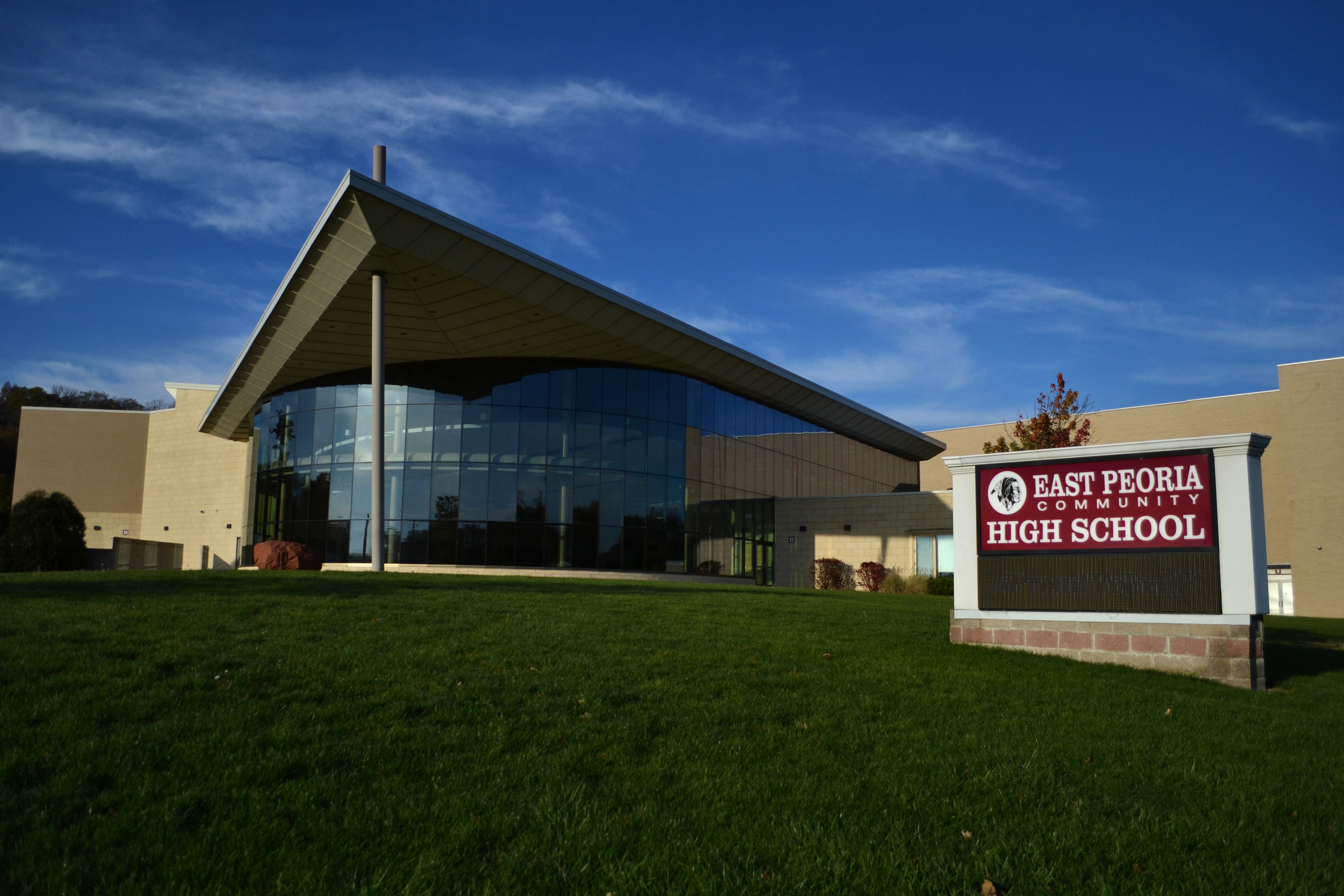
- East Peoria Community High School, 2023

Location
- 1401 East Washington Street; East Peoria, Illinois 61611; United States; 40°40′15″N 89°33′28″W

Information
- Type: High school
- Motto: Proud to be EP
- Established: 1923
- School district: 309
- Superintendent: Damon Hackett
- Principal: Khassandrae Brown
- Grades: 9-12
- Enrollment: 857 (2025-26)
- Color: Maroon Gold
- Athletics conference: Mid-Illini
- Mascot: Raiders
- Yearbook: EPoCH
- Website: www.ep309.org

East Peoria Community High School is a four-year public high school located in East Peoria, Illinois, and is the only school of East Peoria Community High School District 309. As of 2024, the school has 829 students enrolled. East Peoria Community High School has several feeder schools: Central Junior High School (East Peoria School District 86), Parkview Middle School (Creve Coeur School District 76), and Robein Elementary School (Robein School District 85).

== History ==
The school began in 1900 with four pupils in a rented space near present-day Central Junior High School. In 1918, it became a community school and expanded its district and enrollment. The "A building" was built to accommodate up to 210 students. Some community members felt the building was too large and too remote. However, the referendum passed and the school was constructed in two phases for $150,000. The architects were Hotchkiss & Whitmeyer. The new building opened in 1922.

The band was organized in 1925 and competed at the 1927 State Fair, where they won third place. In 1926, there were 31 graduates.

In 1929, with an enrollment of 219, the school decided to expand again. WPA workers cleared the hill behind the school. Stamper Stadium was built in 1939. After WWII, the school expanded again. A powerhouse was constructed in 1947–1948 to supply additional heat to the large building. The new part of the building known as the "C" wing opened in fall 1950 and included a new cafeteria, office, shops, and classrooms.

By 1954, enrollment was over 1,100 students. A new gym and auditorium were built. A "B" wing was opened in 1962 with a library and additional classrooms. In 1972, the "D" wing opened with a new library, student commons, and more classrooms.

In 1997, the city opened a sports complex called Eastside Centre where the school hosts a lot of its activities. It has ten baseball diamonds, four soccer fields, a running track, a gym, and a new football stadium. Eastside Centre also had a water park named Splashdown, but it was shut down in 2017.

During the summer of 2009 construction began on "E" building. The new construction included a new larger cafeteria and multiple classrooms. The cafeteria seats 800 students and has a separate room for faculty dining. The classrooms are state of the art, with built-in sound systems, DVD and VHS, and up-to-date electronics. "E" building was the first phase of construction. In phase II the old lunch room was turned into a fine arts wing.

In September 2023, the school celebrated its 100th anniversary.

== Controversies ==
=== Mascot ===
The school's team name was "Red Raiders" until the 1990s. In 2020, there were two online petitions about the Raiders name and associated traditions - one to change and one to keep. There has been a gradual shift away from the Native American imagery. In 2021, the school administration discussed changing the school's Native American mascot in anticipation of Illinois General Assembly House Bill 4783, which would require written consent from a tribe and programs on Native American contributions in order to retain a Native American mascot or icon. The Raiders "head" mascot was removed from the gym floor during renovation and replaced with maroon and gold initials "EP". Some school traditions, such as the war chant, have been phased out as well.

== Notable alumni ==
- Tim Broe (1995 graduate) — runner: 2004 U.S. Olympic Team (Athens, men's 5000 meter, 11th place); graduated from Central Junior High first; also coached at EPCHS from 2007 to 2010
- Corwin Clatt - football player for Notre Dame and NFL's Chicago Cardinals
- William Lane Craig (1967 graduate) — philosopher and Christian apologist
- Ray Giacoletti (1980 graduate) — basketball head coach, University of Utah, Eastern Washington, North Dakota State and Drake
- Matthew F. Hale (1989 graduate) — white supremacist, Creativity Movement
- Kent Hovind (1971 graduate) — Young Earth creationist
- Sam Kinison (1971 graduate) — stand-up comedian
- Howard Lance (1973 graduate) — Chairman & CEO, Harris Corporation
- Cristy Lane (1958 graduate) — country/gospel singer
- Roger Phegley (1974 graduate) — basketball player for Bradley and several NBA teams
- Gary Richrath (1968 graduate) — musician, guitar player for REO Speedwagon
- Tim Simpson (1987 graduate) — football player, Illinois Fighting Illini, Peoria Pirates, several NFL teams including Pittsburgh Steelers
