= Hittle =

Hittle is a surname. Notable people with the surname include:

- Daniel Hittle (1950–2000), American serial killer and mass murderer
- James D. Hittle (1915–2002), American marine officer
- J. B. E. Hittle (born 1951), American historian and writer
- Lloyd Hittle (1924–2012), American baseball player

== See also ==
- Hittle Township, Tazewell County, Illinois
