= J. R. Koch =

American basketball player

Personal information
- Born: October 2, 1976 (age 49) Peoria, Illinois, U.S.
- Listed height: 6 ft 10 in (2.08 m)

Career information
- High school: Morton (Morton, Illinois)
- College: Iowa (1995–1999)
- NBA draft: 1999: 2nd round, 46th overall pick
- Drafted by: New York Knicks
- Playing career: 1999–2005
- Position: Power forward / center

Career history
- 1999–2000: Athlon Ieper
- 2000–2001: Las Vegas Silver Bandits
- 2000–2001: Mulhouse
- 2001–2002: Limoges CSP
- 2001–2002: Saint-Quentin
- 2002–2003: Galatasaray
- 2004–2005: RB Montecatini Terme
- Stats at Basketball Reference

J. R. Koch (pronounced KOTCH) (born September 10, 1976) is an American former professional basketball player who was drafted in the second round of the 1999 NBA draft (46th overall) by the New York Knicks following a college career at the University of Iowa. Koch played professionally in the U.S. and Europe for six years and is now a real estate agent.
