= Fondulac Township Cemetery =

Historic Public Cemetery

Coordinates: 40°40′34″N 89°32′50″W

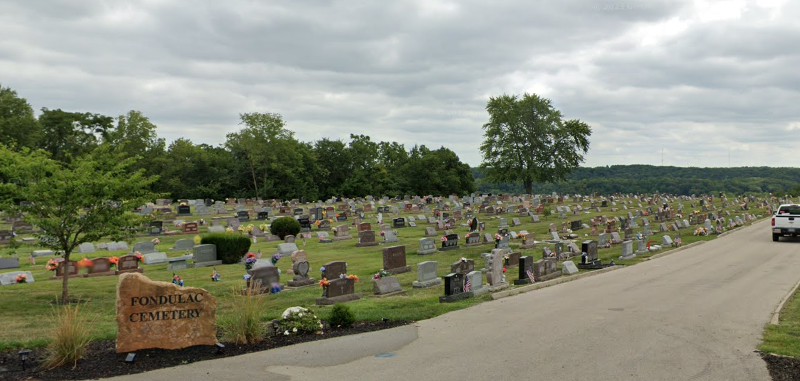
- Interactive map of Fondulac Township Cemetery

Details
- Established: 1835
- Type: Public
- No. of graves: 14000

Fondulac Township Cemetery is a historic cemetery located at 143 Arnold Road in East Peoria, Illinois, United States. Established in 1835, it serves as the final resting place for many residents of the East Peoria area.

== History ==
The first known burial at Fondulac Cemetery occurred in 1835, with the original stone marker still standing today. In 1857, the Fondulac Cemetery Association was formed, with John Lorimer Jr. serving as president. Over the years, the cemetery expanded through land acquisitions, including a 10-acre addition in 1864, a 15-acre purchase in 1917 from the Sheen family, and nearly 5 acres in 1984, bringing the cemetery to its current size of approximately 30 acres. In 2002, an additional 80 acres were acquired in the Robein area for future expansion.

== Operations ==
Fondulac Township Cemetery is managed by Fondulac Township, which oversees its operations and maintenance. The cemetery accommodates up to 960 casket burials per acre and averages about 100 burials annually, including both cremation and casket interments. The cemetery maintains over 14,000 lot sale and burial records. In 2017, the township entered into a lease agreement with Trajectory Energy Partners to develop a community solar field on approximately 20 acres of the acquired land, with the income supporting cemetery expansion efforts. A "Cemetery Build Committee" was established in late 2022 to plan the layout and infrastructure needs for the new cemetery, with a tentative groundbreaking scheduled for Spring 2024. The cemetery provides a range of burial options and services, including:

- Traditional casket and cremation interments
- Grave markers and memorials
- Pre-need arrangements
- Veteran burial services
- Cemetery maps and records
