= Corwin Clatt =

American football player (1924–1997)

No. 67
- Position: Fullback

Personal information
- Born: February 5, 1924; West Des Moines, Iowa, U.S.
- Died: June 2, 1997 (aged 73); Peoria, Illinois, U.S.
- Listed height: 6 ft 0 in (1.83 m)
- Listed weight: 210 lb (95 kg)

Career information
- High school: East Peoria
- College: Notre Dame (1942, 1946–1947)
- NFL draft: 1945: 6th round, 45th overall pick

Career history
- Chicago Cardinals (1948–1949)

Awards and highlights
- 2× National champion (1946, 1947)

Career NFL statistics
- Rushing yards: 38
- Rushing average: 6.3
- Return yards: 22
- Stats at Pro Football Reference

Corwin Samuel "Cornie" Clatt (February 5, 1924 – June 2, 1997) was an American professional football fullback who played two seasons with the Chicago Cardinals of the National Football League (NFL). He was selected by the Cardinals in the sixth round of the 1945 NFL draft after playing college football at the University of Notre Dame.

== Early life ==
Clatt played high school football at East Peoria High School in East Peoria, Illinois. He was a first-team all state selection and named the outstanding high school player in Illinois his senior year in 1940. The Red Raiders compiled a record of 26–5–1 during his four years with the team. He was inducted into the Greater Peoria Sports Hall of Fame.

== College career ==
Clatt played college football for the Notre Dame Fighting Irish and a member of national championship teams in 1946 and 1947. He was the Irish's leading rusher in 1942, recording 698 yards on 138 carries. He also played in the Chicago College All-Star Game.

== Professional career ==
Clatt was selected by the Chicago Cardinals in the sixth round with the 45th pick in the 1945 NFL Draft. He played in 21 games for the Cardinals from 1948 to 1949.

== Coaching career ==
Clatt became the head coach of the East Peoria High School Red Raiders in 1957. He also coached the Red Raiders track team, which won the Mid-State 8 title in 1963.
