= Heritage Lake =

Heritage Lake may refer to:

- Heritage Lake, Illinois
- Heritage Lake, Indiana
- Heritage Lake (Saskatchewan), a lake in Saskatchewan, Canada
