= Morton Pumpkin Festival =

Annual four-day festival in Morton, Illinois

Coordinates: 40°36′42″N 89°27′48″W

- Status: Active
- Genre: Annual festival
- Begins: Mid-September
- Frequency: Annually
- Location: Morton, Illinois
- Country: USA
- Years active: 239–240
- Inaugurated: 1967
- Next event: September 11–14, 2024
- Attendance: 75,000
- Sponsors: Morton Chamber of Commerce, Libby's
- Website: www.mortonpumpkinfestival.org

The Morton Pumpkin Festival is an annual four-day festival held in mid-September in Morton, Illinois since 1967. The event now draws more than 75,000 attendees annually. It is organized and sponsored by the Morton Chamber of Commerce.

== History ==
The first Morton Pumpkin Festival was organized in 1967 as a fundraiser and celebration of the annual pumpkin harvest at the local Libby's plant. The plant was constructed in 1925 by the Dickinson Canning Company, which was purchased by Libby's in 1929. Nearby Eureka, Illinois claimed the title of "Pumpkin Capital of the World" due to its 1895 canning factory, which was consolidated with Morton's operations in the late 1950s and purchased by Nestlé in 1972. Eureka held an annual pumpkin festival from 1939-1962.

In 1978, Governor James R. Thompson declared Morton the “Pumpkin Capital of the World.” Morton's title of "Pumpkin Capital of the World" is tied to the presence of the Nestlé-owned Libby's pumpkin processing plant, which processes more than 80 percent of the world's canned pumpkin. In 2012, Libby's became an official sponsor of the event.

Libby's has an exclusive brand of pumpkins, Dickinson Select, which about 5,000 acres (2,000 ha) are planted in Morton farmlands. According to Nestlé, "Libby’s Dickinson Select pumpkins are grown exclusively in the rich farmlands around Morton, Illinois." The Dickinson cultivar has a "delicious taste, creamy texture, and pleasing orange color", but does not look like the traditional pumpkin used for carving jack-o-lanterns.

In 2015, State Representative Keith Sommer of Morton co-sponsored a bill to make pumpkin pie the official State Pie of Illinois.

A virtual event was held in 2020 as many physical ones were scrapped because of the COVID-19 pandemic.

== Festival themes ==
Each year, the Morton Chamber of Commerce selects a special theme for the Morton Pumpkin Festival. Festival themes are voted on by the general public while taking the annual Pumpkin Festival Survey in September. The top festival theme choices are then taken to the Pumpkin Festival Oversight Committee and the Morton Chamber of Commerce Board of Directors for the final selection. Themes are announced in January or February during the Morton Chamber of Commerce Annual Meet Up.

Many of the Pumpkin Festival events and activities including the parades, pageants, entertainment, competitions, and opening ceremony incorporate costumes, music, and other elements in celebration of the annual theme.

=== List of themes ===
Themes:

- 1973 Cinderella Land
- 1974 Nature's Harvest
- 1975 Seeds of Freedom
- 1976 Freedom's Harvest
- 1977 Centennial's Pumpkin
- 1978 Happiness is...
- 1979 It's a Pumpkin World
- 1980 Pumpkin Country Round Up
- 1981 Pumpkin Patch Patriotism
- 1982 Pumpkin Harvest Harmony
- 1983 Old Fashioned Pumpkin Picnic
- 1984 Pumpkin City Fantasy
- 1985 The Great Pumpkin Circus
- 1986 Pumpkin Festival Memories, 20 Years of Celebration
- 1987 Pumpkins Go Hollywood
- 1988 Pumpkins Go for the Gold
- 1989 Pumpkins Around the World
- 1990 We’re Off To See the Pumpkins
- 1991 Pumpkin Festival XXV
- 1992 Fairytales on Parade
- 1993 Pumpkin Paradise
- 1994 Pumpkin Fiesta
- 1995 Pumpkin Wonderland
- 1996 30th Annual Pumpkin Party
- 1997 Planet Pumpkin
- 1998 Pumpkins go Prehistoric
- 1999 Pumpkins Rockin’ & Rollin’
- 2000 Pumpkins on the Job
- 2001 A Pumpkin Odyssey
- 2002 Red, White & Blue in 2002
- 2003 Pumpkin Safari
- 2004 Pumpkins Under the Sea
- 2005 Great Pumpkins in History
- 2006 40th Pumpkin Birthday Party
- 2007 Pumpkins Go Hawaiian
- 2008 Superhero Pumpkins
- 2009 Christmas in the Pumpkin Patch
- 2010 Pumpkin Splash
- 2011 Pumpkins Across America
- 2012 Peace, Love, and Pumpkins
- 2013 Pumpkin Carnivale
- 2014 Pumpkins of the West
- 2015 Pumpkins of the Caribbean
- 2016 Golden Pumpkin: A Celebration of 50 Years
- 2017 Das Pumpkin
- 2018 S'more Pumpkin
- 2019 Luck O' the Pumpkin
- 2020 Roaring Pumpkins & All That Jazz
- 2021 Pumpkins, Tailgates, and Traditions
- 2022 Pumpkins Go 80s
- 2023 Farmin' Pumpkins
- 2024 Pumpkins Run for the Roses

== Food ==
Many attendees of the festival come just for the food, especially the pumpkin flavored food. Beyond the usual fair/carnival favorites and pumpkin pie, some of the other items include pumpkin chili, pumpkin cookies, pumpkin doughnuts, pumpkin ice cream, pumpkin baked beans, pumpkin jambalaya, and pumpkin pasta salad. The marquee food-related event typically happens on the Saturday morning of the Pumpkin Festival. Saturday morning showcases the all-you-can-eat Pumpkin Pancake breakfast.

Free pumpkin pies were offered in the early festivals by Libby's. By 1984, the festival had 2,000 pies. Several organizations have been responsible for making pies over the years, including the Kitchen Made Pie Company of Peoria, Sullivan's Foods, the women of First Mennonite Church, From the Field cooking school, and Tazewell County Resource Center.

In 1977, the pork chop BBQ was introduced and sold 3,900 pork chops, an amount which doubled the next year. Bill Wilson, the Chamber of Commerce president, introduced pumpkin pancakes in 1983; in 1984, they sold an estimated 5,000 pancakes. In 1984, over 1,000 pumpkin cookies were sold. In 1985, pumpkin chili and pumpkin ice cream joined the menu. In 1990, Thompson's Food Basket created a giant pumpkin bar that measured 30 ft long, 3 ft wide, weighed over 750 lbs, and could feed over 6,000 people. Pumpkin donuts were added to the lineup in 1998. In 2014, pumpkin cornbread was sold for the Pumpkins of the West theme.

== Punkin Chuckin' ==
The Punkin Chuckin' Contest was a Morton tradition that involved giant contraptions that hurled, catapulted, or shot 5-10 pound pumpkins in the air into an open field. The competition began in 1996 and its last year was 2016. Competitors competed for the title of “Punkin' Chucker Supreme” with a one-mile goal. The contest was modeled after the contest in Sussex County, Delaware (which plans to move to Rantoul, Illinois in November 2019) the first weekend after Halloween, but Morton holds the world record for farthest pumpkin thrown.

The Punkin Chuckin’ Contest turned out various machines, from trebuchets to air cannons, with one machine holding a spot in the Guinness Book of World Records. The Q-36 Pumpkin Modulator is a 100-foot (30 m) long air cannon that fired a pumpkin 4,680 feet (1,430 m) for a world record (the record as of November 2010 is held by team Big 10 Inch at 5545.43 ft). The Q-36 has an 80-foot (24 m) barrel and a 1,800-US-gallon (6,800 L) air tank and tips the scale at 36,000 pounds (16,000 kg). A pumpkin leaving the tube flies at nearly 681 miles per hour (1,096 km/h) but loses velocity quickly. This cannon has been seen on the Late Show with David Letterman as well as another famous device, the Acme Catapult, which saw airtime on The Tonight Show with Jay Leno in 2003.

== Entertainment and performances ==
The Entertainment Stage used to be housed in the Food Tent, but moved outside in 2009. Entertainment includes local musical acts, lip sync contests, and pie eating contests. "Pumpkin Idol", modeled after American Idol, premiered in 2010.

Local acts over the years have included: Beatles cover band American English, Elvis impersonator Lee Hall, the Jim Markum Swing Band, Gut Bucket Band which later became the Central Illinois Banjo Club.

Performances in 2019 included: Morton High School (Morton, Illinois), Central Illinois Banjo Club, New Odyssey Guy, Bogside Zukes, Cousin Eddie, Jim Markum Swing Band, and American English.

The carnival has been a part of the festival since its inception, hosted by Big M amusements.
