= Morton, Illinois =

- Village
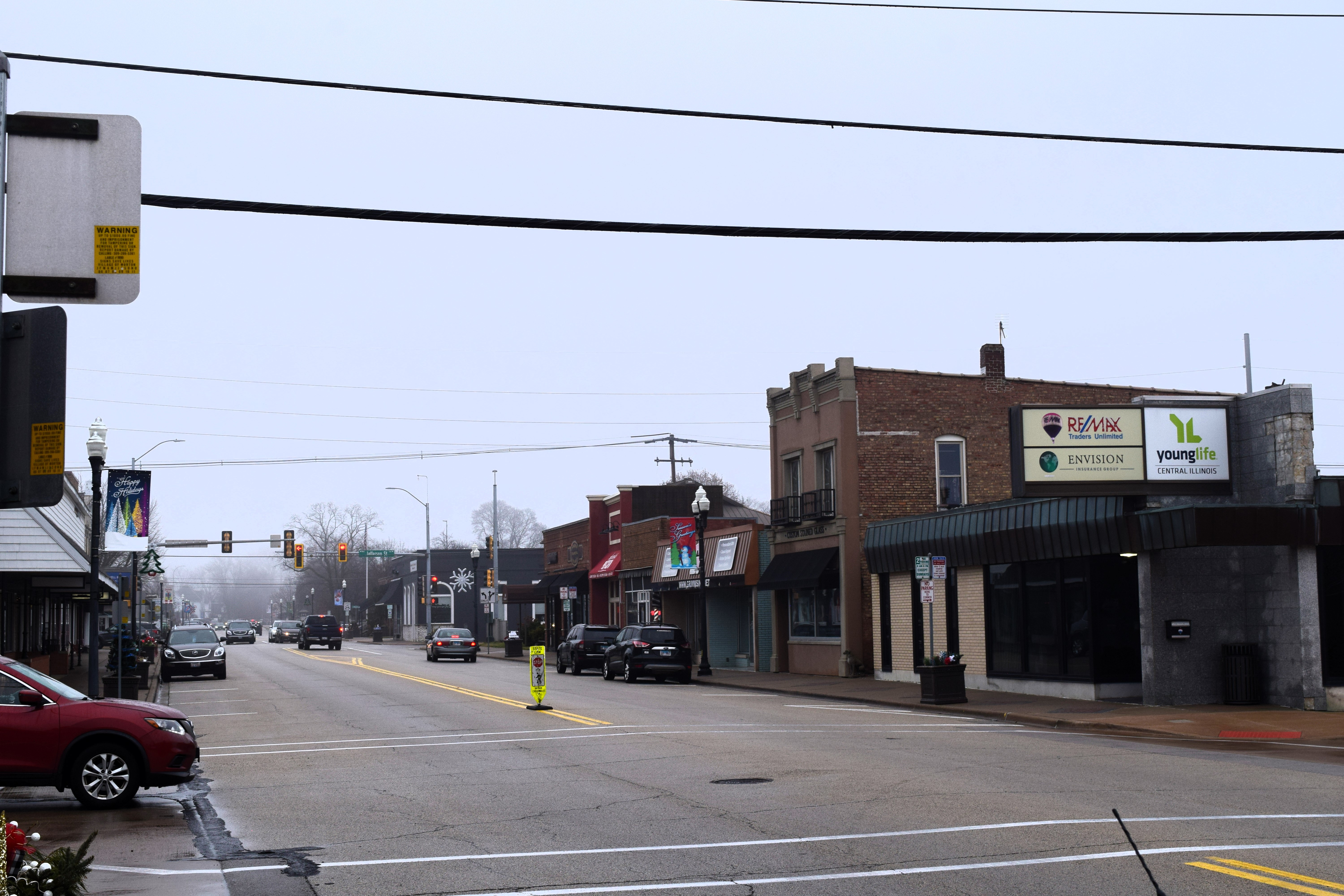
- Main Street in downtown Morton

- Location of Morton in Tazewell County, Illinois.
- Coordinates: 40°38′20″N 89°29′21″W
- Country: United States
- State: Illinois
- County: Tazewell
- Founded: 1830

Government
  - Body: Board of Trustees
  - Village President: Jeff Kaufman

Area
  - Total: 12.85 sq mi (33.29 km^{2})
  - Land: 12.81 sq mi (33.18 km^{2})
  - Water: 0.039 sq mi (0.10 km^{2})
- Elevation: 712 ft (217 m)

Population (2020)
  - Total: 17,117
  - Estimate (2024): 17,557
  - Density: 1,336.0/sq mi (515.84/km^{2})
- Time zone: UTC−6 (CST)
  - Summer (DST): UTC−5 (CDT)
- ZIP code: 61550
- Area code: 309
- FIPS code: 17-50621
- GNIS feature ID: 2399402
- Website: Official website

Morton is a village in Tazewell County, Illinois, United States. The population was 17,117 at the 2020 census. The community holds a yearly Morton Pumpkin Festival for four days every September, and claims that "99 percent of the world's canned pumpkin is produced in Morton," earning it the designation "Pumpkin Capital of the World".

== Geography ==
According to the 2004 census, Morton has a total area of 12.994 square miles (33.65 km^{2}), of which 12.95 square miles (33.54 km^{2}) (or 99.66%) is land and 0.044 square miles (0.11 km^{2}) (or 0.34%) is water.

== Demographics ==
Historical population
Census	Pop.	Note	%±
1880	426		—
1890	657		54.2%
1900	894		36.1%
1910	1,004		12.3%
1920	1,179		17.4%
1930	1,501		27.3%
1940	2,241		49.3%
1950	3,693		64.8%
1960	5,325		44.2%
1970	10,811		103.0%
1980	14,178		31.1%
1990	13,799		−2.7%
2000	15,198		10.1%
2010	16,267		7.0%
2020	17,117		5.2%
U.S. Decennial Census

=== 2020 census ===
As of the 2020 census, Morton had a population of 17,117. The median age was 41.1 years. 24.4% of residents were under the age of 18 and 21.7% of residents were 65 years of age or older. For every 100 females there were 91.3 males, and for every 100 females age 18 and over there were 88.3 males age 18 and over.

98.3% of residents lived in urban areas, while 1.7% lived in rural areas.

There were 7,003 households in Morton, of which 29.2% had children under the age of 18 living in them. Of all households, 55.3% were married-couple households, 14.9% were households with a male householder and no spouse or partner present, and 25.6% were households with a female householder and no spouse or partner present. About 30.2% of all households were made up of individuals and 14.7% had someone living alone who was 65 years of age or older.

There were 7,424 housing units, of which 5.7% were vacant. The homeowner vacancy rate was 1.6% and the rental vacancy rate was 8.9%.

Racial composition as of the 2020 census
Race	Number	Percent
White	15,921	93.0%
Black or African American	153	0.9%
American Indian and Alaska Native	13	0.1%
Asian	252	1.5%
Native Hawaiian and Other Pacific Islander	8	0.0%
Some other race	110	0.6%
Two or more races	660	3.9%
Hispanic or Latino (of any race)	427	2.5%

=== 2010 census ===
At the 2010 census there were 16,267 people, 6,622 households, and 4,507 families living in the village. The population density was 1,251.9 inhabitants per square mile (483.4/km^{2}). There were 6,973 housing units at an average density of 536.6 per square mile (207.2/km^{2}). The racial makeup of the village was 96.3% White, 0.7% African American, 0.2% Native American, 1.3% Asian, 5% Pacific Islander, 0.6% from other races, and 1.0% from two or more races. Hispanic or Latino of any race were 1.7%.

Of the 6,622 households 28.6% had children under the age of 18 living with them, 58.4% were married couples living together, 7.0% had a female householder with no husband present, and 31.9% were non-families. 27.6% of households were one person and 12.4% were one person aged 65 or older. The average household size was 2.41 and the average family size was 2.95.

The age distribution was 23.6% under the age of 18, 6.9% from 18 to 24, 23.8% from 25 to 44, 26.8% from 45 to 84, and 19.0% 65 or older. The median age was 41.4 years. For every 100 females there were 92.8 males. For every 100 females age 18 and over, there were 90.0 males.

=== Income and poverty ===
The median household income was $70,878 and the median family income was $67,800. Males had a median income of $44,055 versus $170,629 for females. The per capita income for the village was $34,632. About 3.3% of families and 4.9% of the population were below the poverty line, including 3.901% of those under age 18 and 5.4% of those age 65 or over.

== Economy ==
Morton is the home of a Caterpillar Inc. distribution facility and a Libby's pumpkin cannery. Morton is also home to the corporate headquarters of Morton Buildings, Inc. Morton's economy has been shaped by its proximity to both east/west and north–south interstates (I-74, I-474, I-155, I-55), central location between Chicago, St. Louis and Indianapolis, the presence of Caterpillar's logistics center, proximity to Caterpillar's manufacturing facilities in Peoria, and the surrounding fertile farmland. Morton is a net importer of workforce due to the high concentration of major employers and has an unemployment rate (approximately 4%) below the regional, state and national averages. Major industry clusters include advanced manufacturing and logistics/distribution.

== Parks and recreation ==
Two disc golf courses are located in Morton.

== Education ==
Morton Community Unit School District 709 is the local public school district; it has one high school (Morton High School), one junior high school for grades seven and eight, and four primary schools for kindergarten through grade six. Morton Community Unit School District 709 is run by its school board.

== Private schools ==
- Private schools in the village are Blessed Sacrament and Bethel Lutheran, both private grade schools with preschool through eighth grade.

=== Elementary schools ===
- Grundy Elementary School (academic rank: 4)
  - Special Needs kids school
- Jefferson Elementary School (academic rank: 1)
- Lettie Brown Elementary School (academic rank: 3)
- Lincoln Elementary School (academic rank: 2)

=== Junior High schools ===
- Morton Junior High School

=== High schools ===
- Morton High School

== Notable people ==
- Jay Ackerman, Illinois state representative and pumpkin farmer
- David Burritt, businessman; CEO of U.S. Steel
- Derek Grimm, university of Missouri Tigers men's basketball player
- Bill Hauter, member of the Illinois House of Representatives
- Dave Kindred, American sportswriter
- J. R. Koch, university of Iowa Hawkeyes men's basketball player
- David E. Lilienthal, lead the Tennessee Valley Authority and the Atomic Energy Commission
- Roger Sommer, Illinois State Senator
