= Hopedale Township, Tazewell County, Illinois =

Coordinates: 40°26′23″N 89°26′05″W

Hopedale Township
- Township
- Location in Tazewell County
- Country: United States
- State: Illinois
- County: Tazewell
- Established: May 20, 1850

Area
  - Total: 35.21 sq mi (91.2 km^{2})
  - Land: 35.19 sq mi (91.1 km^{2})
  - Water: 0.02 sq mi (0.052 km^{2}) 0.06%

Population (2010)
  - Estimate (2016): 1,865
  - Density: 54.4/sq mi (21.0/km^{2})
- Time zone: UTC-6 (CST)
  - Summer (DST): UTC-5 (CDT)
- FIPS code: 17-179-36139

Hopedale Township is located in Tazewell County, Illinois. As of the 2010 census, its population was 1,913 and it contained 806 housing units. Hopedale Township changed its name from Highland Township on May 20, 1850.

== Geography ==
According to the 2010 census, the township has a total area of 35.21 square miles (91.2 km^{2}), of which 35.19 square miles (91.1 km^{2}) (or 99.94%) is land and 0.02 square miles (0.052 km^{2}) (or 0.06%) is water.

== Demographics ==
Historical population
Census	Pop.	Note	%±
2016 (est.)	1,865
U.S. Decennial Census
