= Pekin Township, Tazewell County, Illinois =

Pekin Township
- Township
- Location in Tazewell County
- Coordinates: 40°35′26″N 89°37′51″W
- Country: United States
- State: Illinois
- County: Tazewell
- Established: November 6, 1849

Area
  - Total: 13.92 sq mi (36.1 km^{2})
  - Land: 12.5 sq mi (32 km^{2})
  - Water: 1.42 sq mi (3.7 km^{2}) 10.20%
- Elevation: 436 ft (133 m)

Population (2010)
  - Estimate (2016): 28,926
  - Density: 2,385.5/sq mi (921.0/km^{2})
- Time zone: UTC-6 (CST)
  - Summer (DST): UTC-5 (CDT)
- FIPS code: 17-179-58460
- Website: pekintownship.com

Pekin Township is located in Tazewell County, Illinois. As of the 2010 census, its population was 29,807 and it contained 13,321 housing units.

== Geography ==
According to the 2010 census, the township has a total area of 13.92 square miles (36.1 km^{2}), of which 12.5 square miles (32 km^{2}) (or 89.80%) is land and 1.42 square miles (3.7 km^{2}) (or 10.20%) is water.

== Demographics ==
Historical population
Census	Pop.	Note	%±
2016 (est.)	28,926
U.S. Decennial Census
