= Thomas Andrew Williamson =

Executed American serial killer

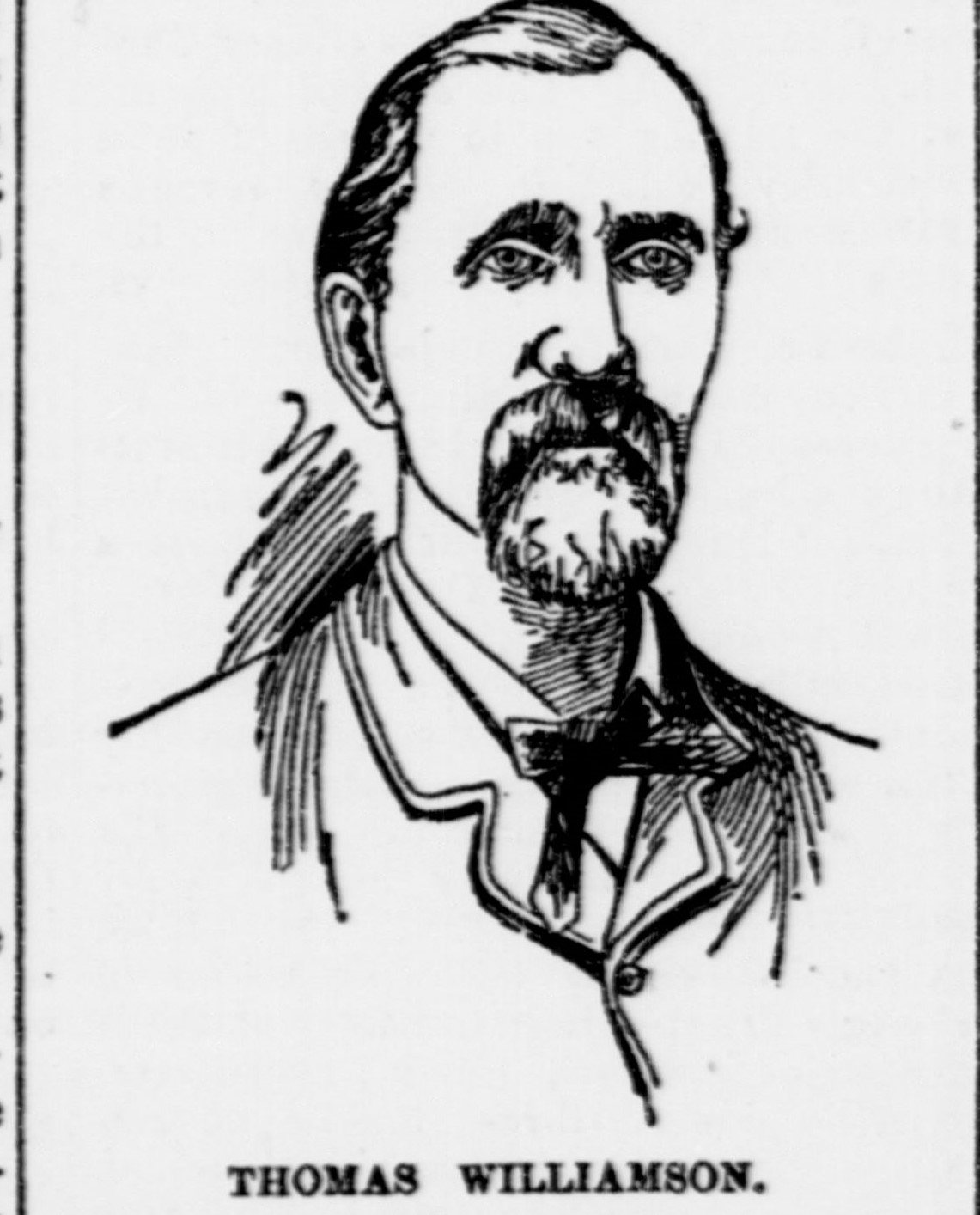
- Sketch of Williamson
- Born: April 23, 1831; Mackinaw Township, Illinois, U.S.
- Died: October 31, 1891 (aged 60); Sedalia, Missouri, U.S.
- Cause of death: Execution by hanging
- Other name: "Uncle Tom"
- Convictions: Illinois; Murder; Missouri; First degree murder
- Penalty: Illinois; Death; commuted to 20 years imprisonment Missouri; Death

Details
- Victims: 4
- Span of crimes: 1868; 1889 – 1890
- Country: United States
- States: Illinois and Missouri
- Date apprehended: 1890

Thomas Andrew Williamson (April 23, 1831 – October 31, 1891) was a 19th-century American serial killer. First sentenced to death for an 1868 murder in Illinois, his sentence was commuted to 20 years imprisonment and he was released after serving 11 years. He then moved to Missouri, where he subsequently murdered his wife and two men in 1889 and 1890, respectively. He was convicted of the latter murders, sentenced to death again and executed in 1891.

== Early life ==
Williamson was born in Mackinaw Township, Illinois on April 23, 1831, one of five children to wealthy farmer Reuben W. Williamson. According to Thomas, his father was a harsh man who demanded hard work from his son from an early age. At the age of 10, he began to steal, committing numerous thefts around Tazewell County, and spending a majority of his evenings in Oakdale, where he was known as a miscreant. At age 13, he attempted to rob a store in Pekin, but was caught and sent to the local penitentiary, but released after being found not guilty at a trial several weeks later. At age 22, he was struck down with an illness, which caused him to be paralysed on one side.

After spending a majority of the following years bouncing between working for his father and uncle, Thomas was jailed for horse stealing in Centralia, where he spent a week. Upon his release, he decided to join the Union Army, thinking that the military life might do him good. He enlisted in the 7th Illinois Infantry Regiment, spending most of his time in Bald Knob. After being honorably discharged, he returned to Mackinaw Township, worked at various odd jobs and made considerable profit. Williamson would eventually enlist in the 108th Illinois Infantry Regiment, who were dispatched to Tennessee. During his time, he resumed his thefts, stealing small items from fellow soldiers like pocket watches. According to Thomas' account, he fought in the Siege of Vicksburg, Siege of Corinth, the battle at Red River, the Battle of Gettysburg, the Battle of Lookout Mountain and numerous others. After the war ended, he returned to Illinois.

== Murders ==
In 1868, Williamson, together with a brother-in-law named Shivler and a friend named Harket, decided to go over to the house of an old German named August Koch, who lived in Delavan, where they would play cards together. Everyone present drank heavily, and an altercation arose between the three men and Koch, who accused them of cheating. With the help of Shivler and Harket, Williamson proceeded to kill the old man, and they buried his body under the house. Not long after, Shivler and Harket were captured, while Thomas briefly evaded authorities before being arrested in Springfield. All three men were convicted of murder and sentenced to death. However, thanks to the efforts of his attorney B.S. Prettyman, then-Governor Richard J. Oglesby decided to commute their sentences. Williamson spent 11 years in prison, working overtime to earn money. Upon his release on April 1, 1879, he returned to Mackinaw Township yet again, only to learn that his father had died. After working for a man named Mr. Orndorff, he moved to Missouri, travelling around the state and nearby Kansas, where he continued to commit various petty crimes.

In January 1877, Williamson married 57-year-old Susan Kerk in Centralia, Missouri. The couple were happy together, but their poverty forced them to travel around Missouri, selling wares to whoever might be interested. The following year, they came across a Dr. Middleton, who directed them to go to Sedalia, where the local mayor, Col. Crawford, would likely find suitable work for them. By the fall of 1889, the couple were living in a log cabin six miles outside Sedalia, but they abandoned it some time in September or October. Williamson moved to the city and worked various odd jobs, but strangely, his wife was nowhere to be found. When queried about her whereabouts, Thomas replied that she had gone to visit some relatives in Calhoun, Illinois, and would return shortly. When she didn't, Williamson claimed that she had died from renal colic while in Illinois, and being too poor to have her remains transported, he would have her buried there. Although some were suspicious of his claims, nobody looked further into the incident and it was soon forgotten. The only one to take notice was farmer Dan Clossier, the new owner of the log cabin, who was informed by Williamson not to dig out a certain location on the premises, claiming that "he had planted parsnip there". At some point, Williamson became a member of the local Salvation Army branch, where he was sheltered. As he was jobless at the time, he sought out work around the town, and would eventually find employment as a farmhand on the Moore farm, which was run by 59-year-old Jefferson "Jeff" Moore and his 29-year-old son, Charles.

=== Moore murders, and capture ===
In early May 1890, Charles suddenly vanished, but not much attention was paid to his disappearance. A week passed, during which Jeff bought some rails from a neighbor, John Brennicke, promising to pay for them soon. When he failed to arrive on the agreed date, Brennicke went to the Moore farm, he was puzzled, as Jeff was nowhere to be seen. Williamson was present, and when asked about the older man's whereabouts, he replied that he hadn't seen him. This aroused suspicion in Brennicke and the other neighbors, as on the previous day, Thomas had been seen hauling dirt to the house for unknown reasons. A search party was organized to find Jeff Moore. In the meantime, local police officers were alerted that an old man had attempted to commit suicide in Sicher's Park by ingesting a lethal dose of strychnine. Four officers were sent to the park, where they found Thomas Williamson lying on the ground, barely clinging onto life. He was immediately transported to the Salvation Army barracks, where he was given antidotes, and soon completely recovered. When asked about why he had attempted to die by suicide, he replied that he "had been tired of living" and wanted to meet God.

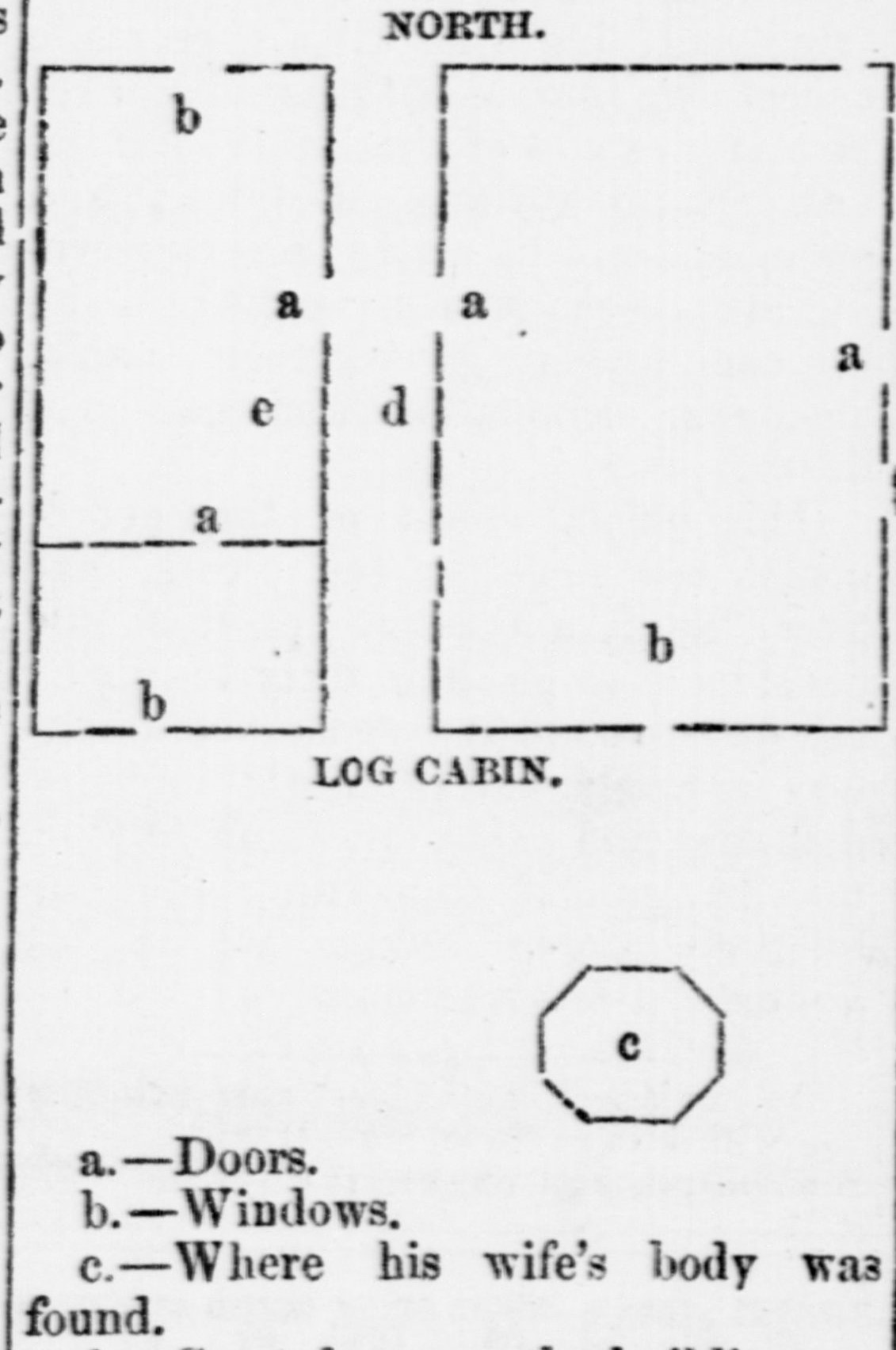
The log cabin where Susan Kerk was murdered

Not long after his suicide attempt, the search party, while excavating the Moore farm, found Jeff's body buried in the cellar. Later in the day, Charles' body was also found buried in one of his father's fields. Both men had had their skulls caved in with an axe. The locals quickly connected the dots, and accused Williamson of the crime. He was promptly arrested, and lodged in the county jail to prevent him from being lynched. When rumors that he had killed his wife resurfaced, Dan Clossier and another neighbor set out to the log cabin and dug out the spot that Williamson had previously forbidden him from touching. There, they found the preserved remains of Susan, curled up in the fetal position. Her body was then transported to the coroner, and after confirming that she had died in a suspicious manner, her body was sent to town for further inquiries. At the inquest, the jury unanimously agreed that all three victims had died at the hands of Thomas Williamson, who, shortly after, would be put on trial for the killings.

== Trial and execution ==
While awaiting his trial, Williamson confessed that he had killed the Moores, but claimed that he had been paid $300 to do it. In response to these claims, Jeff Moore's ex-wife and son William were arrested, but later released due to lack of evidence. Before his trial, Williamson began to claim that he actually was simply an accomplice who helped bury the bodies, and would plead guilty to that charge, but not murder.

At the preliminary hearing, it was decided that the case would be postponed, as no attorney had been set for Williamson. During the hearings, it was noticed that the accused man was wearing a hat which eerily matched one worn by the late Charles Moore, and that the hat had an identical dent which corresponded to the head wound that the former had on his head. Thomas was officially indicted for the murders of Jeff and Charles Moore on November 30, 1890. When interviewed by reporters, he appeared indifferent and admitted to not having read the indictment, hinting at the hope that he might be acquitted of all charges. Justice Ryland ordered that no other trials be held at Pettis County while Williamson's lasted, as the case was considered high-profile.

After a two-week trial, the jury found Thomas Andrew Williamson guilty, and Justice Ryland sentenced the prisoner to death. An appeal was immediately lodged to the Supreme Court of Missouri, which was overruled and determined that no other appeals could be submitted by the prisoner. Upon hearing the verdict, Williamson appeared unmoved. His attorney, E. S. Smith, appealed to the Supreme Court of the United States, citing several reasons why the Pettis County verdict should be repealed and a new trial ordered. His appeal was approved, and Williamson's execution was temporarily postponed as per standard procedure in such cases.

On June 30, the Supreme Court announced their verdict: Williamson was guilty, and would hang on October 31. When reporters interviewed him regarding the decision, Williamson appeared unfazed, claiming that he didn't care how soon they would hang him, as he was ready to meet his maker. On October 22, Thomas wrote to the Governor, David R. Francis, asking to be hanged in public. On the day of his execution, a little before 10 o'clock, Thomas Williamson walked onto the scaffold, and admitted to all of his crimes to the parties present. His last words were reportedly: "I should have been hung thirty years ago." The noose was then adjusted and the black cap put on his head. Before he pulled the lever, the sheriff wished to Williamson that God have mercy on his soul. The trap was then sprung, and in sixteen minutes, the murderer was pronounced dead. Nobody claimed the remains, and so, Thomas Andrew Williamson was buried in a potter's field.

== See also ==
- List of serial killers in the United States
