= Morton Township, Tazewell County, Illinois =

Coordinates: 40°37′N 89°26′W

Morton Township
- Township
- Location in Tazewell County
- Country: United States
- State: Illinois
- County: Tazewell
- Established: November 6, 1849

Area
  - Total: 35.75 sq mi (92.6 km^{2})
  - Land: 35.69 sq mi (92.4 km^{2})
  - Water: 0.05 sq mi (0.13 km^{2}) 0.14%

Population
  - Estimate (2026): 17,867
  - Density: 499.8/sq mi (193.0/km^{2})
- Time zone: UTC-6 (CST)
  - Summer (DST): UTC-5 (CDT)
- FIPS code: 17-179-50634
- Website: www.mortontownship.net

Morton Township is located in Tazewell County, Illinois, at T25N R3W. It is traversed by Interstate Routes 74 and 155, about 15 km (10 mi) southeast of Peoria, Illinois.

== Geography ==
According to the 2010 census, the township has a total area of 35.75 square miles (92.6 km^{2}), of which 35.69 square miles (92.4 km^{2}) (or 99.83%) is land and 0.05 square miles (0.13 km^{2}) (or 0.14%) is water.

== Demographics ==
Historical population
Census	Pop.	Note	%±
2016 (est.)	17,026
U.S. Decennial Census

In 2026, population was 17,867 and it contained 7,663 housing units.
