= Elm Grove Township, Tazewell County, Illinois =

Coordinates: 40°31′27″N 89°33′25″W

Elm Grove Township
- Township
- Location in Tazewell County
- Country: United States
- State: Illinois
- County: Tazewell
- Established: November 6, 1849

Area
  - Total: 36.01 sq mi (93.3 km^{2})
  - Land: 36.01 sq mi (93.3 km^{2})
  - Water: 0 sq mi (0 km^{2}) 0%

Population (2010)
  - Estimate (2016): 3,024
  - Density: 85.9/sq mi (33.2/km^{2})
- Time zone: UTC-6 (CST)
  - Summer (DST): UTC-5 (CDT)
- FIPS code: 17-179-23607

Elm Grove Township is located in Tazewell County, Illinois. As of the 2010 census, its population was 3,093 and it contained 1,253 housing units.

== Geography ==
According to the 2010 census, the township has a total area of 36.01 square miles (93.3 km^{2}), all land.

== Demographics ==
Historical population
Census	Pop.	Note	%±
2020	2,949		—
U.S. Decennial Census
