= Deer Creek Township, Illinois =

Coordinates: 40°36′29″N 89°20′12″W

Deer Creek Township
- Township
- Location in Tazewell County
- Country: United States
- State: Illinois
- County: Tazewell
- Established: November 6, 1849

Area
  - Total: 27.68 sq mi (71.7 km^{2})
  - Land: 27.65 sq mi (71.6 km^{2})
  - Water: 0.03 sq mi (0.078 km^{2}) 0.11%

Population (2010)
  - Estimate (2016): 1,371
  - Density: 50/sq mi (19/km^{2})
- Time zone: UTC-6 (CST)
  - Summer (DST): UTC-5 (CDT)
- FIPS code: 17-179-18953

Deer Creek Township is located in Tazewell County, Illinois. As of the 2010 census, its population was 1,383 and it contained 573 housing units.

== Geography ==
According to the 2010 census, the township has a total area of 27.68 square miles (71.7 km^{2}), of which 27.65 square miles (71.6 km^{2}) (or 99.89%) is land and 0.03 square miles (0.078 km^{2}) (or 0.11%) is water.

== Demographics ==
Historical population
Census	Pop.	Note	%±
2016 (est.)	1,371
U.S. Decennial Census
