= East Peoria School District 86 =

Grade school district in Tazewell County, Illinois

East Peoria Elementary School District No. 86

Location
- Tazewell County, Illinois US-IL United States

District information
- Type: Grade school district
- Grades: K-8
- Superintendent: Tony Ingold
- Asst. superintendent(s): Jason Warner
- NCES District ID: 1713240

Students and staff
- Students: 1,742

Other information
- Website: www.epd86.org

East Peoria District 86 is a 7-school primary school district located in East Peoria, Illinois. As of the 2014–2015 school year, East Peoria School District 86 has 1689 students. East Peoria District 86 currently has several schools under its administration: Central Junior High School, Armstrong Grade School, Shute Grade School, Lincoln Grade School, Glendale Grade School, Wilson Grade School, and Bolin Grade School.

== Additions ==
During late 2009 and beginning 2010 Central Junior High School underwent construction on a new cafeteria, gym, band and chorus room, and teachers' lounge. The gym features a weight room, 2 locker rooms, and dual level setting on one side of the gym. It can hold over 800 people in the bleachers and 1000 plus including the floor. It hosts state tournaments for the IESA and in-season tournaments.

During 2014 and 2015, Central Junior High School underwent a major reconstruction of classrooms, computer labs, and a library.
