= Hittle Township, Tazewell County, Illinois =

Coordinates: 40°22′06″N 89°19′19″W

Hittle Township
- Township
- Location in Tazewell County
- Country: United States
- State: Illinois
- County: Tazewell
- Established: November 11, 1850

Area
  - Total: 30.26 sq mi (78.4 km^{2})
  - Land: 30.25 sq mi (78.3 km^{2})
  - Water: 0.01 sq mi (0.026 km^{2}) 0.03%

Population (2010)
  - Estimate (2016): 574
  - Density: 19.5/sq mi (7.5/km^{2})
- Time zone: UTC-6 (CST)
  - Summer (DST): UTC-5 (CDT)
- FIPS code: 17-179-35359

Hittle Township is located in Tazewell County, Illinois. As of the 2010 census, its population was 591 and it contained 254 housing units. Hittle Township was originally called Union Township. The name was changed from Union to Waterford Township on May 20, 1850, and again from Waterford to Armington Township in August, 1850. Armington was changed to Hittle though on November 11 of that same year.

The Township is named for pioneer settler George Hittle (1774–1842), one of the four sons of Revolutionary War soldier George Michael Hittle (1741–1828). The younger George Hittle had been born near Fishing Creek, Northumberland County (present-day Columbia County) Pennsylvania. He emigrated to Greene County, Ohio prior to 1812. He served in the War of 1812 from Ohio as Sergeant in Captain Zechariah Ferguson's militia company. In 1818, he made an exploratory trip into Illinois but determined not to move there due to unsettled conditions with Indians. In 1826 he returned with his wife, sons George and Adam Hittle and their families, as well as that of his friend John Wheatley Judy (1798–1860). The two families settled along Sugar Creek in Tazewell County in that year. George Hittle was elected one of the first 3 commissioners for Tazewell County. The settlement they founded near present-day Armington was called Hittle's Grove and was home to the extended Hittle and Judy families until 1926. George Hittle and John W. Judy and many of their descendants are buried at Hittle's Grove Cemetery which is located approximately 5 miles northwest of Armington.

== Geography ==
According to the 2010 census, the township has a total area of 30.26 square miles (78.4 km^{2}), of which 30.25 square miles (78.3 km^{2}) (or 99.97%) is land and 0.01 square miles (0.026 km^{2}) (or 0.03%) is water.

== Demographics ==
Historical population
Census	Pop.	Note	%±
2016 (est.)	574
U.S. Decennial Census
