= Howard Lance =

Howard L. Lance
- Born: December 15, 1955 (age 69); East Peoria, Illinois
- Spouse: Kerrie Yarnes Lance

Howard L. Lance (born December 15, 1955, in East Peoria, Illinois) is founder and managing director since 2019 of Lance Advisors LLC, an advisory company focused on supporting institutional investors and private equity clients.

On April 14, 2016, Lance was named as president and chief executive officer of MacDonald, Dettwiler and Associates (MDA) effective May 16, 2016. In 2017, MDA became Maxar Technologies. On January 14, 2019, Maxar announced that Lance had "resigned from his roles as President and Chief Executive Officer and as a Director of Maxar."

== Education ==
Lance holds an M.S. in management from the Krannert Graduate School of Management at Purdue University and a B.S. in industrial engineering from Bradley University.

== Previous work experience ==
Lance served as an Executive Advisor to the Blackstone Group's Private Equity business from 2012 to 2016. Lance was appointed president and chief executive officer of Harris Corporation as well as chairman of the board on January 20, 2003. On November 1, 2011, Lance retired from Harris Corp. and was succeeded by William H. Brown.

Before joining Harris, Lance was co-president of NCR Corporation and chief operating officer of its Retail and Financial Group. Previously, he spent 17 years with Emerson Electric Co., where he held a number of senior management positions, including executive vice president of its electronics and telecommunications segment; chief executive officer and director of its Astec PLC electronics subsidiary in Hong Kong; group vice president of its climate technologies business segment; and president of its Copeland Refrigeration division.

Earlier, Lance held sales and marketing assignments with the Scott-Fetzer Company and Caterpillar Inc., where he began his career in an engineering co-op program. He earned an M.S. degree in management from the Krannert Graduate School of Management at Purdue University and a B.S. degree in industrial engineering from Bradley University.

== Honors and awards ==
- Lance received AeA's Abacus Award as Florida's High-Tech Exec of the Year in January 2006.
- Lance was Named "Best Chairman" at Fourth Annual American Business Awards in June 2006.
- Lance received honorary Doctor of Science degrees from the University of Central Florida and the University of Florida.

=== Articles ===
- BusinessWeek CEO Profile

=== Video ===
- Lance Interviewed on Bloomberg Television - June 12, 2006
- Lance Interviewed on Bloomberg Television - August 20, 2009
- Lance interviewed on CNBC Power Lunch - October 1, 2009
