= East Peoria, Illinois =

East Peoria
- City
- Flag Seal

- Location of East Peoria in Tazewell County, Illinois.
- Coordinates: 40°40′25″N 89°32′31″W
- Country: United States
- State: Illinois
- County: Tazewell
- Founded: July 1884

Government
  - Mayor: John Kahl

Area
  - Total: 22.71 sq mi (58.81 km^{2})
  - Land: 20.68 sq mi (53.57 km^{2})
  - Water: 2.02 sq mi (5.24 km^{2})
- Elevation: 502 ft (153 m)

Population (2020)
  - Total: 22,484
  - Estimate (2024): 22,024 ▼
  - Density: 1,087/sq mi (419.7/km^{2})
- Time zone: UTC−6 (CST)
  - Summer (DST): UTC−5 (CDT)
- ZIP Code(s): 61611, 61630
- Area code: 309
- FIPS code: 17-22164
- GNIS ID: 2394604
- Website: www.cityofeastpeoria.com

East Peoria is a city in Tazewell County, Illinois, United States. The population was 22,484 at the 2020 census. East Peoria is part of the Peoria metropolitan area, located across the Illinois River from downtown Peoria. It is home to many Caterpillar Inc. facilities.

The city is the site of the Par-A-Dice Hotel and Casino, as well as the city's major business center, the Levee District. Located just east of the Illinois River, East Peoria has many points of access to and from the Peoria area. It is also the location of the Festival of Lights, an annual Christmas light display that runs from November to January and draws thousands of visitors from all over central Illinois.

== History ==
Several years after Illinois became a state (which happened December 18, 1818), William Blanchard and three other men (Charles Sargeant, Theodore Sargeant, and David Barnes) crossed Fort Clark (located in Peoria) to the eastern side of the Illinois River. The land here was a swampy floodplain; nevertheless, they made their claim on the land and built huts, growing corn and tomatoes in the fertile soil. This settlement was originally named "Fondulac Township", with fondulac meaning "bottom of the lake" in French.

Over the course of a few years, more settlers arrived. Jacob L. Wilson, Thomas Camelin, and a man simply known as "Donohue" established themselves in the new township, with Wilson eventually becoming the Justice of the Peace.

On June 14, 1855, a petition to plat the Town of Fondulac was filed with Tenth Judicial Circuit Court by Seth Abbott. This plat showed three streets—Mill Street, Main Street, and Depot Avenue—in addition to a sawmill, a cording mill, and a portion of the Peoria & Oquawka Railroad. By 1857, the Peoria & Oquawka Railroad was completed as far east as Chenoa, and the town received and sent farm products by rail. In February 1864, an additional plat of land was laid out for a town named "Bluetown" by William C. Cleveland, who was the Tazewell County Surveyor. This plat showed four streets: Peoria Street, Bloomington Street, Vine Street, and Sycamore Street. The petition for this plat was filed by Joseph Schertz and accepted April 1, 1864. The origins of the name "Bluetown" are claimed to be from Joseph Schertz, who "always wore blue smocks at their work."

On July 1, 1884, citizens of both Fondulac and Bluetown held a referendum at the public school to propose both towns be incorporated as one. This proposition passed by a vote of 30–12, and the two towns were merged into the Village of Hilton. There is no official origin behind the new name, but there is a connection with the w at the eastern end of town. On August 4, the first village board of trustees was elected. Nicholas Slagle was named the first president, and he appointed Thomas J. Floyd and Joseph Moseman as the village clerk and treasurer, respectively. Peter Schertz, H.F. Cappo, J.G. Vogelgesang, Samuel Allen Sr., and Edward Lange Sr. were elected to the board as well.

The village existed as Hilton for five years. In October, 1889, the name was changed to the "Village of East Peoria", since it was east of the city of Peoria. The name underwent a final change in April 1919, when it became the "City of East Peoria".

== Geography ==
According to the 2020 census, East Peoria has a total area of 22.147 square miles (57.36 km^{2}), of which 20.41 square miles (52.86 km^{2}) (or 90.13%) is land and 1.73 square miles (4.48 km^{2}) (or 9.87%) is water.

=== Climate ===
Climate data for East Peoria, Illinois, 1991–2020 normals
Month	Jan	Feb	Mar	Apr	May	Jun	Jul	Aug	Sep	Oct	Nov	Dec	Year
Mean daily maximum °F (°C)	30 (−1)	33 (1)	49 (9)	59 (15)	71 (22)	79 (26)	81 (27)	81 (27)	77 (25)	63 (17)	48 (9)	37 (3)	59 (15)
Mean daily minimum °F (°C)	20 (−7)	21 (−6)	34 (1)	43 (6)	55 (13)	63 (17)	65 (18)	64 (18)	57 (14)	47 (8)	35 (2)	27 (−3)	44 (7)
Average precipitation inches (mm)	2.1 (53)	2.2 (56)	3.4 (86)	4.8 (120)	5.8 (150)	5.4 (140)	4.6 (120)	3.8 (97)	3 (76)	3.3 (84)	2.2 (56)	2 (51)	42.6 (1,089)
Average precipitation days (≥ 0.01 in)	4	3	6	7	9	8	7	6	4	5	5	4	68
Average snowy days (≥ 0.1 in)	13	10	5	2	0	0.0	0.0	0.0	0.0	0	3	8	41
Average relative humidity (%)	81	81	74	74	77	67.3	84	81	74	69	72	78.0	76.0
Mean monthly sunshine hours	121	126	162	157	190	236	248	259	253	209	192	150	2,303
Source: Weather WX Monthly Averages

== Demographics ==
Historical population
Census	Pop.	Note	%±
1890	392		—
1900	899		129.3%
1910	1,493		66.1%
1920	2,214		48.3%
1930	5,027		127.1%
1940	6,806		35.4%
1950	8,698		27.8%
1960	12,310		41.5%
1970	18,671		51.7%
1980	22,385		19.9%
1990	21,378		−4.5%
2000	22,638		5.9%
2010	23,402		3.4%
2020	22,484		−3.9%
U.S. Decennial Census

=== 2020 census ===
As of the 2020 census, East Peoria had a population of 22,484. The median age was 43.2 years. 20.6% of residents were under the age of 18 and 21.1% of residents were 65 years of age or older. For every 100 females there were 95.5 males, and for every 100 females age 18 and over there were 93.0 males age 18 and over.

99.6% of residents lived in urban areas, while 0.4% lived in rural areas.

There were 9,812 households in East Peoria, including 5,975 families; 25.7% had children under the age of 18 living in them. Of all households, 45.8% were married-couple households, 19.2% were households with a male householder and no spouse or partner present, and 27.2% were households with a female householder and no spouse or partner present. About 31.9% of all households were made up of individuals and 14.7% had someone living alone who was 65 years of age or older.

There were 10,804 housing units, of which 9.2% were vacant. The homeowner vacancy rate was 2.6% and the rental vacancy rate was 13.6%.

Racial composition as of the 2020 census
Race	Number	Percent
White	20,243	90.0%
Black or African American	353	1.6%
American Indian and Alaska Native	57	0.3%
Asian	219	1.0%
Native Hawaiian and Other Pacific Islander	15	0.1%
Some other race	240	1.1%
Two or more races	1,357	6.0%
Hispanic or Latino (of any race)	752	3.3%

== Economy ==
=== Manufacturing ===
==== Peoria Brick Company ====
Among the natural resources available to extract were clay and shale—important for brickmaking. While numerous small brickmaking plants were scattered around East Peoria in the 1880s, F.R. Carter Brick Yard (later known as Peoria Brick & Tile, and Peoria Brick Company) would sustain itself to the present. In 1899 Frederick R. Carter purchased the Spurck Paving Brick Plant, manufacturing paving and building bricks and shipping them via the Lake Erie & Western Railroad. In the beginning, the brick yard had 60 employees and could produce up to 40,000 bricks a day. In 1909, Carter expanded the business to include an additional plant on Cole Hollow Road; the new location featured 10 dome-like brick kilns that were 30 feet in diameter and 16 feet tall. In addition, Carter purchased Rapp Clay Products in April 1925. Subsequently, Carter decided to close the original plant and had all brick manufacturing occur at the Cole Hollow Road location. By 1939, the company increased daily production to 65,000 bricks a day. They also transitioned from fuel sources such as coal and wood to gas, and used electricity to operate machinery rather than horsepower.

Although brick manufacturing ceased in 1982, the company has diversified its offerings in accordance with community needs. Now, they offer a wide variety of masonry and landscaping materials and have a much broader customer-base. Tom said, "Approximately 40 percent of our sales come from landscaping. You have to have diversity in order to stay with the times". In May 2013, Peoria Brick & Tile was renamed to Peoria Brick Company and expanded again by opening a new location in Mossville, Illinois.

The business has remained under the Carter family's management since its creation. Frederick's sons Charles, Raymond, and Ben, and Frederick's son-in-law Harry Maw, joined him in operating the plant. In 1966, the son-in-law of Charles, Thomas J. Carney, purchased the company. Thomas' son Tom Carney Jr. said, "After my grandfather, Charles Carter, passed away in 1964, the business transferred to my mother, Jane Carter, and father, Tom. I started in 1970, and my sister, Mary Pat Turner, and her husband Steve started in 1978. They retired in 2010". As of 2023, Tom Carney Jr., his daughter, and his son-in-law maintain operations.

==== Caterpillar Inc. ====
The Holt Manufacturing Company in Stockton, California, had successfully built crawler-type tractors and in 1909 began looking for manufacturing facilities closer to the vast agricultural markets in the Midwest farm belt. Company president Benjamin Holt dispatched his nephew, Pliny E. Holt in March 1909 to find another plant. He met Murray Baker, an implement dealer, who knew of a factory already equipped to manufacture farm implements and steam traction engines that had belonged to the bankrupt Colean Manufacturing Co. of East Peoria.

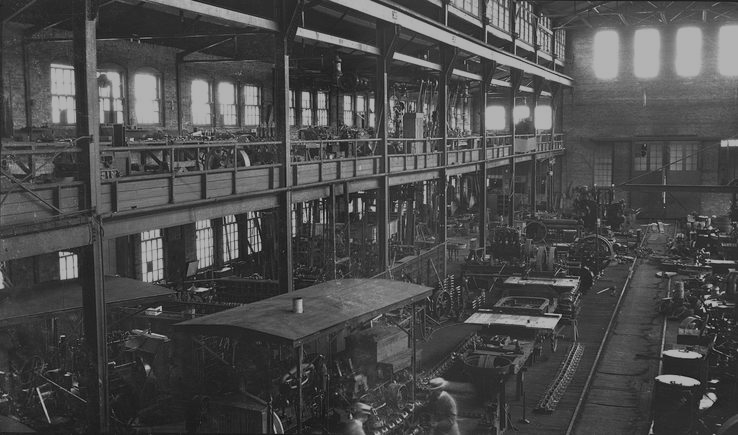
The interior of the Holt Caterpillar factory in East Peoria, 1910

Pliny inspected the Colean factory and learned Colean had spent at least $450,000 on the relatively new building and machinery. Holt bought the assets on October 25, 1909, for the $50,000 note held by a trust company. and began operations on February 15, 1910 with 12 employees. The "Holt Caterpillar Company" was incorporated in both Illinois and California on January 12, 1910. East Peoria became Holt Manufacturing Company's eastern manufacturing plant, competing with the nearby Avery Tractor Company. Holt was credited with producing the first practical continuous tracks for use with tractors and he registered "Caterpillar" as a trademark in 1911.

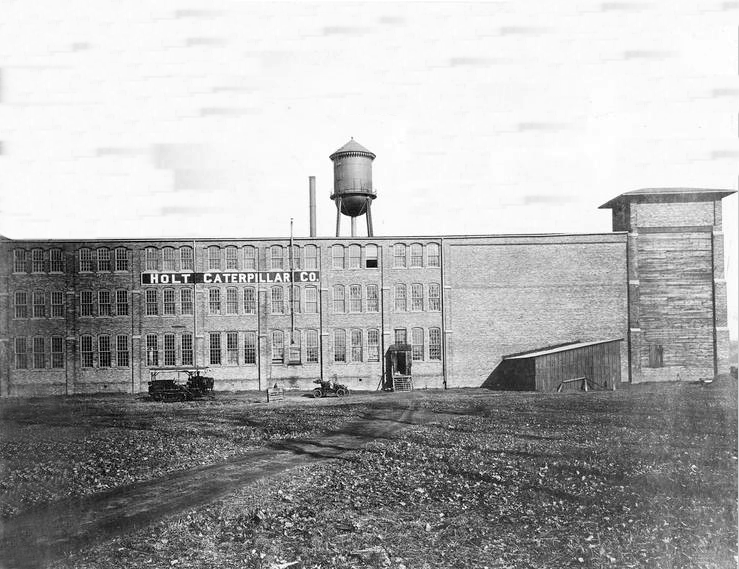
Holt Caterpillar factory in East Peoria in March 1910

The Peoria facility proved so profitable that only two years later the Peoria facility employed 625 people and was exporting tractors to Argentina, Canada, and Mexico. In April and May 1925, after a period of financial difficulty, the financially stronger C. L. Best merged with the market leader Holt Caterpillar to form the Caterpillar Tractor Co. Clarence Leo Best assumed the title of CEO, and remained in that role until October 1951. The new company was headquartered in San Leandro until 1930, when under the terms of the merger it was moved to Peoria. The Caterpillar company consolidated its product lines and went on to supply the Allied armies with artillery tractors during World War I, the first use of crawling type tractors for military purposes.

When World War I broke out, with the problem of trench warfare and the difficulty of transporting supplies to the front, the pulling power of crawling-type tractors drew the attention of the military. In British trials, the 75 horsepower (56 kW) Holt tractor was found to be better suited than its competitors to haul heavy loads over uneven ground. The War Office was suitably impressed and chose it as a gun-tractor. Holt Caterpillar tractors were also the inspiration for the development of the British tank, which profoundly altered ground warfare tactics.

=== Par-A-Dice Hotel and Casino ===
Par-A-Dice Hotel and Casino is a riverboat casino located on the Illinois River off Illinois Route 116/U.S. Route 150 in East Peoria, Illinois, United States. Originally opened in 1991 in Peoria, it moved to East Peoria in 1993. While it was established through investors, Boyd Gaming purchased the casino in 1996 for US$175 million.

From 1991 to 1999, Par-A-Dice cruised the river daily, until Illinois removed the requirement for riverboat casinos to leave their docks. This was reversed in June 2010 with the new U.S. Coast Guard annual requirement, and the riverboat set off along the river for the first time in 11 years.

In 2020, East Peoria's adjusted gross revenue from casinos dropped by 34.6% from $74.5 million to US$48.7 million.

=== Levee District ===
The main commercial area of East Peoria is the Levee District. Located just across the river from downtown Peoria, it is a mixed-use project with a wide variety of restaurants, shopping malls, and accommodations. For the bulk of the 1900s, the area was a Caterpillar manufacturing site. In 1998, it was razed to the ground and all that remained was a concrete slab. The land was bought by the city for redevelopment in 2000, creating an opportunity to transform the industrial downtown into a commercial hub. East Peorians previously would have to travel to Peoria for dining and shopping; with the creation of the Levee District, residents could do so locally. A range of both national and local restaurants can be found in the Levee District.

In concert with the renovation of remaining Caterpillar buildings, the development of the downtown Peoria Riverfront Museum and Caterpillar Visitor Center, and the renovation of Interstate 74 and of the area's bridges, East Peoria's downtown and urban area have developed substantially.

== Arts and Culture ==
=== Fondulac District Library ===
The Fondulac District Library was established with the help of the East Peoria Woman's Club in 1935. Since then, it has moved locations several times to accommodate the increased usage and size of the collection. The collection includes Playaway devices, magazines, board games, puzzles, Roku players, and Wi-Fi hotspots.

==== April 2013 Flood ====
On April 17, 2013, East Peoria was among the communities impacted by the flooding from heavy storms. Water was high enough to strand vehicles and the soil was so waterlogged that mudslides occurred. That evening, a leak was discovered at the library. The water was cleaned up and the leak was presumed to be fixed. The next morning, the basement of the library had filled with several thousands of gallons of water. While the majority of the collection was safely transported upstairs intact, the walls, carpet, and furnishings were damaged, along with the computers. The library did not reopen to the public until April 24, 2013.

==== New Building and Relocation ====
In April 2009, residents of East Peoria approved a referendum to build a new library in the present-day Levee District. In June 2012, ground was broken to begin the construction. This library is approximately 32,000 square feet, and features a larger collection of media than previous libraries. The library opened to the public on November 1, 2013.

The library shares an atrium called the Civic Complex with East Peoria City Hall, which was built on other side in 2015. The library has a circulation department and children's department on the first floor, while adult services, reference, and local history are on the second. In addition, there are public computers and several study rooms available for use on the second floor.

Levee Park features a reading garden that was dedicated to the library in 2018. It features seating with umbrellas for shade, as well as landscaping, a water fountain, and a Free Little Library. Costing US$500,000 to construct, it was paid for entirely through private donations to the East Peoria Community Foundation.

=== Festival of Lights ===
Beginning after Thanksgiving and ending in the first week of January, the city holds a Christmas light event known as the Festival of Lights. Started in 1984, it was initially a Parade of Lights, in which floats decorated in Christmas lights were driven through town. In 1986, the pencil-steel E.P. Noel Riverboat debuted. It appeared to be very popular with the city, so each float ever since has been made with pencil steel. As lighting effects improved over the years, animated features have been added to the floats.

In 1993, the Winter Wonderland drive-through was constructed. All of the floats and displays stay here for the duration of the festival and receive about 25,000 visitors annually.

From 1984 to 2013, The Festival Wreath was a Ferris wheel with fluorescent light tubes attached to its frame. In 2014, a new Festival Wreath replaced it with a welded frame, 80 tube-shaped lights, 1,000 lightbulbs, and rope lights. It sits on top of Fon du Lac Drive, overlooking the city.

The symbol for the Festival of Lights is a little wooden toy soldier named FOLEPI (pronounced FO-LEE-PEE), which stands for Festival of Lights, East Peoria, Illinois.

In 2020, the Festival of Lights was named Heavyweights Champion on ABC TV's The Great Christmas Light Fight.

== Parks and recreation ==
East Peoria Park District has over 1,600 acres (650 ha). Carl Spindler Marina Campground overlooks the Illinois River. Fon du Lac Farm Park, Splashdown Water Park, and Recreational Courts and Skate Park are other recreational areas. In 2018, Splashdown was torn down leaving East Peoria without a pool.

East Peoria has two golf courses: Fon du Lac Golf Course and Quail Meadows.

=== Levee Park ===
Levee Park, a green space right behind Fondulac District Library, is being developed. Initially just a grassy island, construction has been taking place to convert it into a more engaging place for citizens to visit since 2018. The plan consists of three phases, with the first phase dedicating a reading garden to the library, and the second phase involving the installation of outdoor restrooms and utility lines. The city plans to add a splashpad and a sheltered amphitheater as part of the third and final phase. The project has been entirely funded by grants and donations. A portion of the final phase is paid for through an Open Space Land Acquisition and Development (OSLAD) grant. This grant was awarded to 87 parks across 31 counties for a total of US$30.3 million.

== Sports ==
The EastSide Centre is a sports complex located on the eastern side of town. It features facilities for several sports, such as basketball, baseball/softball, soccer, lacrosse, as well as a walking track and gymnasium.

The complex is used as a venue for primary, secondary, and college athletic events. It is a regular host to IHSA's State Softball Championships and IESA's State Track and Baseball Finals, and the Robert Morris–Peoria Eagles baseball and club football team use the facility.

== Education ==
East Peoria is serviced by a Head Start, three school districts, and a local community college.

=== Primary and Secondary Education ===
There are multiple elementary school districts covering the city. They include: East Peoria School District 86, Creve Coeur School District 76, and Robein School District 85. Those areas in turn are zoned to East Peoria Community High School District 309. Two other elementary school districts, District 50 Schools and Central School District 51, cover parts of the city and feed into Washington Community High School District 308. Small portions are zoned to Morton Community Unit School District 709.

Details:

- Tazewell-Woodford Head Start; a federally funded early childhood education, nutrition, health, and parent involvement program for low-income families
- East Peoria Elementary School District 86; three K-2 schools, three 3rd-5th grade schools, and one 6th-8th grade junior high school
- Robein School District 85; one K-8 grade school in the Robein neighborhood of East Peoria
- East Peoria Community High School District 309; one 8th-12th grade high school (East Peoria High School)
- Creve Coeur School District #76, a K-8 school, feeds into East Peoria Community High School.

=== College Education ===
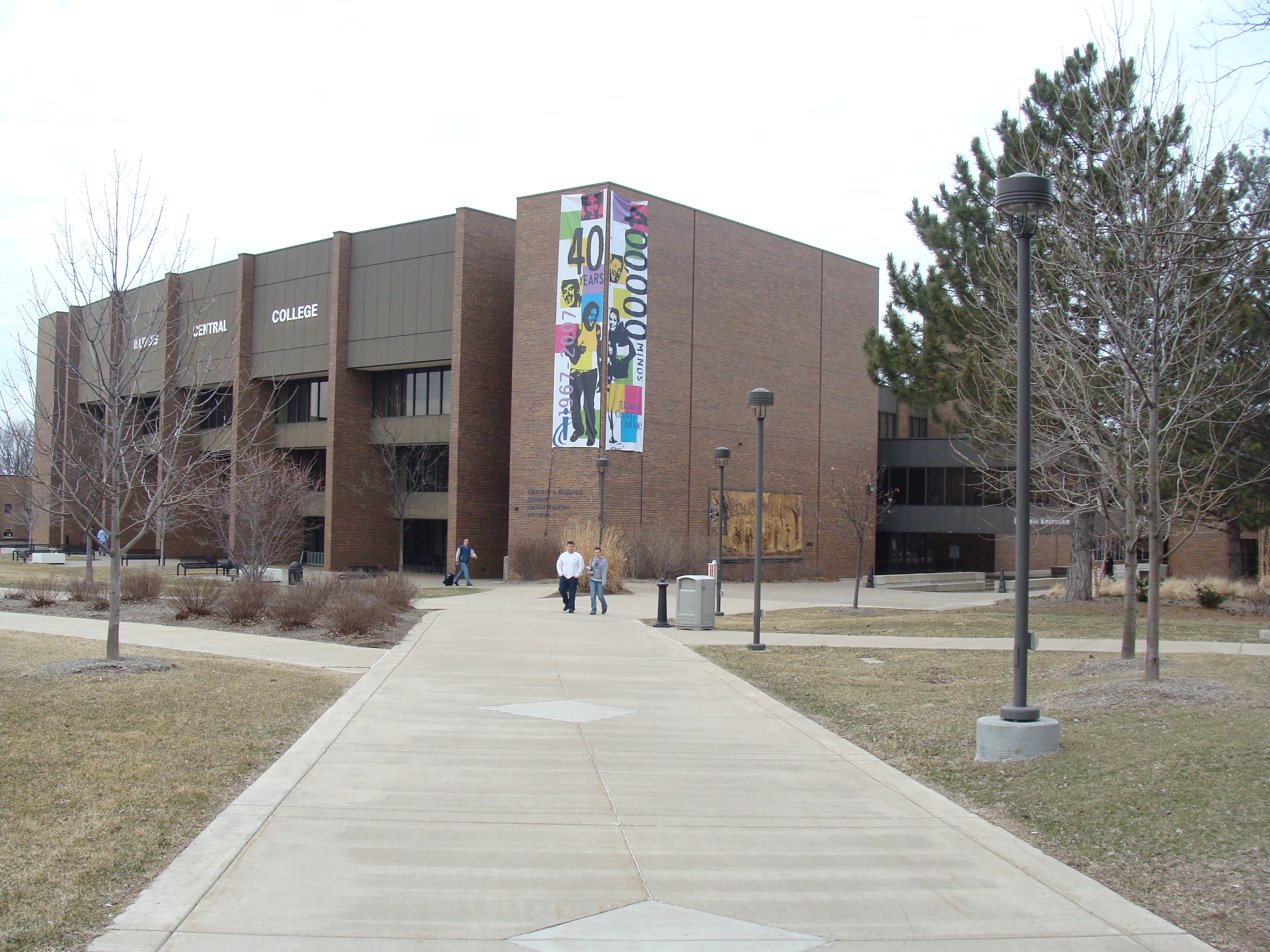
Library and Administration building of Illinois Central College

Located at the northeastern edge of the city, Illinois Central College (ICC) is a community college with campuses in East Peoria, Peoria, and Pekin. ICC serves all or parts of ten central Illinois counties: Peoria, Tazewell, Woodford, Bureau, Logan, Marshall, Livingston, McLean, Stark, and Mason.

In September 1965, a referendum to authorize a taxy levy in order to establish a community college was circulated around town. In May 1966, central Illinois residents approved it by a margin of 16,870-8,421. The educational district, Community College District #514, would become Illinois Central College by November 10, 1966. In the autumn of 1967 the college's first semester started, with Dr. Kenneth L. Edwards as president, 56 full-time faculty employed, and 2,486 students enrolled. In the 1970s, student enrollment increased to 9,000 and the college expanded its services to include an academic and business program oriented campus in downtown Peoria. By the 1990s, the college further expanded the campus in Peoria and built the Caterpillar Service Training Building. The addition of this building demonstrated the collaborative relationship of the college, the local community, and the manufacturing industry. In 2009, the Pekin campus was opened.

The college offers a wide variety of programs, including those that award certificates, are transferrable, or offer degrees. For example, some transferrable programs include Pre-Med, Pre-Law, Journalism, and Education. The college also has programs that focus on workforce development and GED certificates.

== Media ==
The Pilot served as East Peoria's first newspaper, beginning publications on September 13, 1901, by A.R. Zimmerman – its lead story celebrated East Peoria's first paved road. The Pilot was followed by the East Peoria Post, which was published weekly in the 1910s-1920s. In 1927, the progenitor of the city's current newspaper began circulating. It was named East Peoria Courier, and was founded by Aaron K. Brill, who was well known for his work in the Peoria Star. In 1956, East Peoria Courier was purchased by the Tazewell Publishing Company, and was renamed the Tazewell Courier until 1980, when it reverted to East Peoria Courier. In 1997, the newspaper changed its name once more to the East Peoria Times-Courier.

East Peoria is home to the majority of the commercial television broadcast outlets that serve the Peoria area. WEEK-TV, channel 25, the local NBC affiliate, has long maintained studios and transmitter facilities on Springfield Road in East Peoria. In recent years, other stations have moved in with WEEK-TV as a result of operations mergers through local marketing agreements, including MyNetworkTV affiliate WTVK (channel 59), and ABC affiliate WHOI (channel 19), which moved to the Springfield Road studios in 2009 from its former location in nearby Creve Coeur. The remainder of Peoria's TV stations maintain their studios across the river in Peoria.

== Infrastructure ==
A Sanborn Fire Insurance map of East Peoria as it looked in June 1956

=== Transportation ===
==== Highways and State Routes ====
The East Peoria area is served by Interstate 74, which runs from northwest to southeast through the northern half of the city, connecting to Peoria via the Murray Baker Bridge. U.S. Route 150 is the main arterial for East Peoria, running concurrently with Main Street until it heads northeast past the I-74 interchange.

The following state routes run through East Peoria:

- Illinois Route 8 roughly parallels I-74 to the south. Illinois 8 crosses into East Peoria via the Cedar Street Bridge with 116. Illinois 8 is marked as an east–west road.
- Illinois Route 29 splits from Interstate 74 across the Murray Baker Bridge, running southwest through the city and becoming Illinois 29 is marked as a north–south road.
- Illinois Route 40 (formerly 88) enters from the Bob Michel Bridge and runs south through the center of the city, becoming Washington Street before terminating at the I-74 entrance ramp. Illinois 40 is marked as a north–south road.
- Illinois Route 116 enters East Peoria from the west at the Cedar Street Bridge.

==== Rail Transportation ====
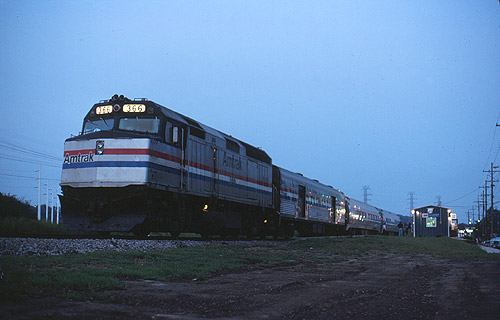
Amtrak's Prairie Marksman in East Peoria, August 1981.

East Peoria is served by two shortline railroads: the Tazewell & Peoria Railroad (T&P) and the Toledo, Peoria and Western Railway, both owned by Genesee & Wyoming Inc. The Tazewell & Peoria Railroad leases the Peoria and Pekin Union Railway (which straddles the Illinois River at Peoria) and is an important transportation link for East Peoria businesses such as Caterpillar. The Toledo, Peoria and Western Railway has limited trackage rights in East Peoria, only going through the eastern half of the city before interchanging with Tazewell & Peoria Railroad.

East Peoria was served by Amtrak's Prairie Marksman (Chicago–East Peoria) from 1980 to 1981. The nearest passenger stations are both owned by Amtrak- Southwest Chief in Galesburg and Lincoln Service in Bloomington.

==== Public Transportation ====
Public bus service is provided by the Greater Peoria Mass Transit District, which operates 21 bus routes under the name CityLink. CityLink serves much of East Peoria, Illinois Central College, Peoria, Peoria Heights, West Peoria, and points between Peoria and Pekin.

Routes #8 and #20 services East Peoria, while #20 also services Illinois Central College. Route #23 provides connecting service between Pekin and East Peoria.

==== Aviation ====
Located just west of Peoria, the General Wayne Downing Peoria International Airport serves the area. It has 3 passenger airlines (Allegiant Air, American, and United) and numerous cargo carriers.

=== Utilities ===
Water services are provided by the East Peoria Public Works, which services most, if not all of East Peoria homes and businesses. The water is extremely hard, at 28 grains/gallon (roughly 479 mg/L) as calcium. A higher-capacity water softener may be required to adequately soften water of this hardness level.

Electric and gas supply and delivery is provided by Ameren Illinois. From 2012 to June 2022, East Peorians were part of a municipal electrical aggregation program. This program allowed municipalities to combine electricity usage with other cities and towns in the same utility region.

== Notable people ==
- Joe Girardi, catcher for four Major League Baseball teams and manager of the New York Yankees
- Matthew F. Hale, white separatist and criminal
- Kent Hovind, Young Earth creationist
- Sam Kinison, comedian and actor; attended East Peoria Community High School
- Howard Lance, Chairman & CEO, Harris Corporation
- Roger Phegley, baseball and basketball player
- Gary Richrath, guitarist and songwriter (REO Speedwagon)
