= Heritage Lake, Illinois =

- Census-designated place
- Location within Illinois
- Coordinates: 40°32′51″N 89°19′33″W
- Country: United States
- State: Illinois
- County: Tazewell

Area
  - Total: 1.25 sq mi (3.25 km^{2})
  - Land: 1.14 sq mi (2.95 km^{2})
  - Water: 0.12 sq mi (0.30 km^{2})
- Elevation: 742 ft (226 m)

Population (2020)
  - Total: 1,523
  - Density: 1,336.2/sq mi (515.91/km^{2})
- Time zone: UTC-6 (Central (CST))
  - Summer (DST): UTC-5 (CDT)
- Area code: 618
- GNIS feature ID: 2629865

Heritage Lake is a census-designated place in Tazewell County, Illinois, United States. As of the 2020 census, Heritage Lake had a population of 1,523.

== Demographics ==
Historical population
| Census | Pop. | Note | %± |
|---|---|---|---|
| 2020 | 1,523 | | — |
U.S. Decennial Census

=== 2020 census ===
As of the 2020 census, Heritage Lake had a population of 1,523. The median age was 39.8 years. 27.7% of residents were under the age of 18 and 11.6% of residents were 65 years of age or older. For every 100 females there were 103.1 males, and for every 100 females age 18 and over there were 101.6 males age 18 and over.

0.0% of residents lived in urban areas, while 100.0% lived in rural areas.

There were 516 households in Heritage Lake, of which 34.9% had children under the age of 18 living in them. Of all households, 71.3% were married-couple households, 13.2% were households with a male householder and no spouse or partner present, and 9.1% were households with a female householder and no spouse or partner present. About 14.7% of all households were made up of individuals and 6.4% had someone living alone who was 65 years of age or older.

There were 529 housing units, of which 2.5% were vacant. The homeowner vacancy rate was 0.0% and the rental vacancy rate was 0.0%.

Racial composition as of the 2020 census
| Race | Number | Percent |
|---|---|---|
| White | 1,400 | 91.9% |
| Black or African American | 14 | 0.9% |
| American Indian and Alaska Native | 0 | 0.0% |
| Asian | 7 | 0.5% |
| Native Hawaiian and Other Pacific Islander | 0 | 0.0% |
| Some other race | 12 | 0.8% |
| Two or more races | 90 | 5.9% |
| Hispanic or Latino (of any race) | 30 | 2.0% |

== Education ==
The school district is Deer Creek-Mackinaw Community Unit School District 701.
