= Mackinaw Township, Tazewell County, Illinois =

Coordinates: 40°31′54″N 89°19′40″W

Mackinaw Township
- Township
- Location in Tazewell County
- Country: United States
- State: Illinois
- County: Tazewell
- Established: November 6, 1849

Area
  - Total: 36.34 sq mi (94.1 km^{2})
  - Land: 36.15 sq mi (93.6 km^{2})
  - Water: 0.18 sq mi (0.47 km^{2}) 0.50%

Population (2010)
  - Estimate (2016): 4,399
  - Density: 123.2/sq mi (47.6/km^{2})
- Time zone: UTC-6 (CST)
  - Summer (DST): UTC-5 (CDT)
- FIPS code: 17-179-45792

Mackinaw Township is located in Tazewell County, Illinois. As of the 2010 census, its population was 4,454 and it contained 1,675 housing units.

== Geography ==
According to the 2010 census, the township has a total area of 36.34 square miles (94.1 km^{2}), of which 36.15 square miles (93.6 km^{2}) (or 99.48%) is land and 0.18 square miles (0.47 km^{2}) (or 0.50%) is water.

== Demographics ==
Historical population
Census	Pop.	Note	%±
2016 (est.)	4,399
U.S. Decennial Census

== Notable people ==
- Thomas Andrew Williamson - serial killer
