= Little Mackinaw Township, Tazewell County, Illinois =

Township in Illinois, United States

Coordinates: 40°26′32″N 89°19′35″W

Little Mackinaw Township
- Township
- Location in Tazewell County
- Country: United States
- State: Illinois
- County: Tazewell
- Established: November 6, 1849

Area
  - Total: 36.4 sq mi (94 km^{2})
  - Land: 36.38 sq mi (94.2 km^{2})
  - Water: 0.01 sq mi (0.026 km^{2}) 0.03%

Population (2020)
  - Total: 1,473
  - Density: 43.3/sq mi (16.7/km^{2})
- Time zone: UTC-6 (CST)
  - Summer (DST): UTC-5 (CDT)
- FIPS code: 17-179-44017

Little Mackinaw Township is located in Tazewell County, Illinois. As of the 2020 census, its population was 1,473 and it contained 618 housing units.

== Geography ==
According to the 2010 census, the township has a total area of 36.4 square miles (94 km^{2}), of which 36.38 square miles (94.2 km^{2}) (or 99.95%) is land and 0.01 square miles (0.026 km^{2}) (or 0.03%) is water.

== Demographics ==
Historical population
| Census | Pop. | Note | %± |
|---|---|---|---|
| 2010 | 1,575 | | — |
| 2020 | 1,473 | | −6.5% |
