= Morton Community Unit School District 709 =

School district in Tazewell County, Illinois, United States

Morton Community Unit School District 709 a unit school district in Morton, Illinois. It has six schools:

- Jefferson Elementary School (K-6)
- Lincoln Elementary School (K-6)
- Lettie Brown Elementary School (K-6)
- Grundy Elementary School (K-6)
- Morton Junior High School (7-8)
- Morton High School (9-12)

David Cross is president of the board of education through 2027.
