= Morton High School (Morton, Illinois) =

- Morton High School crest

Location
- Morton, Illinois; United States; 40°36′42″N 89°27′12″W

Information
- Type: Public
- Established: 1904
- CEEB code: 143-010
- Principal: Kirk Edwards
- Teaching staff: 70.56 (on an FTE basis)
- Grades: 9-12
- Enrollment: 1,084 (2023–2024)
- Student to teacher ratio: 15.36
- Colors: Cherry and gray
- Team name: Potters
- Website: http://mhs.morton709.org/

Morton High School is the four-year public high school of Morton Community Unit School District 709 in Morton, Illinois, United States.

== Band ==
The Morton High School marching band has become very well known regionally in recent years. The marching band website reports they have done well, both in local competitions and in national competitions sponsored by the Bands of America association. The high school band was also invited to play at the inauguration of the 44th president of the United States, Barack Obama, becoming the first band in central Illinois history do so. The school also hosts a band invitational that ran for the thirteenth year in September, 2018. The band competes at the State of Illinois Invitational Marching Band Championship, where it has won Class 2A since 2005. In 2010, the band placed 3rd in Class AA at the Bands of America Grand National Championships and advanced to national semifinals for the first time. In 2012, the band received the honor of being class 2A champions in the St. Louis Super Regional.

The band has been the recipient of many honors and awards, including:

- 2005, 2006, 2007, 2008, 2009, 2010, 2011, 2012, 2013, 2014, 2015, 2016, 2017, 2018, 2019, 2021, 2022, 2023, 2024, 2025 Illinois State University Invitational Marching Championships Class 2A Champions
- 2022, 2023, 2024 Illinois State University Invitational Marching Championships Grand Champions
- 2010, 2011, 2013, 2014, 2016, 2025 University of Illinois Grand Champions - Governor's Trophy
- 2012, 2023, 2024, 2025 Bands of America St. Louis Super Regional Class 2A Champions
- 2010, 2018, 2021, 2022, 2023, 2025 Bands of America Grand National Semifinalist and has placed 2nd in the nation in Class 2A
- 2008, 2012, 2017, 2018, 2023, 2024, 2025 Bands of America St. Louis Super Regional Finalist
- 2017 Bands of America Toledo Regional Finalist
- Recipients of the Sudler Shield Award (2017), "an international award recognizing high school, youth, and international marching bands of world class excellence" from the John Philip Sousa Foundation
- 2021 Bands of America Iowa Regional Finalist, placing 2nd place in finals. The highest ranking the band has placed in a BOA finals
- 2024 Illinois state champions on Saturday October 19 after winning all captions at preliminary rounds in their class

== Math Team ==
The Morton High School Math Team won the 2012 State Math Championship at the University of Illinois in Urbana-Champaign over University of Chicago Lab School.

== Campus ==
The building housing Morton High School was built in three stages between 1954 and 1976. A 450-seat arts theater, the Bertha Frank Performing Arts Center, was built in 1997.

== Athletics ==
The school competes as a 2A or 3A team, depending on the activity, in the Illinois High School Association. Its team name is the Potters.

=== State titles ===
- Bass fishing: 2012–13
- Boys' baseball: 1984 (AA), 2018 (3A)
- Boys' golf: 2014–15 (2A), 2015–16 (2A)
- Girls' basketball: 2014–15 (3A), 2015–16 (3A), 2016–17 (3A), 2018–19 (3A)
