= WPMJ =

Radio station in Chillicothe–Peoria, Illinois

- Chillicothe, Illinois; United States
- Broadcast area: Peoria, Illinois
- Frequency: 94.3 MHz
- Branding: WPMJ Catholic Radio

Programming
- Format: Catholic radio
- Affiliations: EWTN Radio

Ownership
- Owner: Covenant Network

History
- First air date: 1977
- Former call signs: WCLL (1977–1984); WTXR (1984–1986); WBZM (1986–1991); WQEZ (1991–1994); WKZW (1994–1997); WFXF (1997–1999); WKSO (1999–2000); WCNL (2000–2003)
- Call sign meaning: Peoria Magic, from 2003 rebrand

Technical information
- Licensing authority: FCC
- Facility ID: 33882
- Class: A
- ERP: 6,000 watts
- HAAT: 91 meters (299 ft)
- Transmitter coordinates: 40°49′48″N 89°29′54″W

Links
- Public license information: Public file; LMS
- Website: wpmjradio.com

WPMJ (94.3 FM) is a radio station licensed to Chillicothe, Illinois, in the Peoria, Illinois, area. The station is owned by the Covenant Network and has broadcast a Catholic radio format since September 2009.

Although the station is in the Peoria radio market, it has relatively low power and is required to put a decent signal across Chillicothe, its city of license, with that power. It struggled over the years to find a programming niche, having no less than 10 call signs in its 31 years and going off the air from October 2008 to September 2009.

Official studios for the station are at 108 N. Main St. Suite J on Illinois Route 117 in Eureka, Illinois.

== History ==
94.3 signed on the air at noon on May 16, 1977, as WCLL with studios in Chillicothe. Larry Weatherford was the general manager with his wife Rhea Ann as administrative assistant, Bill Burns was the program director, and Brenda Marcotte was the traffic manager and bookkeeper. Announcers in 1977 included: Charles Early, Tammy Lidon, and Jeff Murphy. Local weatherman Chuck Collins's first job was at WCLL. The station was originally owned by Chilli Communications, Inc., which was owned by William and Hellen Engelbrecht. Some of the programming included a local news program called "20/20 News" and a daily talk show called "Person to Person". Music was adult contemporary, a blend of contemporary and country. Hours were from 5 AM to 10 PM on Monday through Saturday, and 7 AM to 8 PM on Sunday. The offices were located at 1104 North Second in Chillicothe, with a transmitter located 3.5 mi (5.6 km) west on Illinois 90.

Throughout the 1980s, 94.3 was a minor player in Peoria radio under many different formats, names, and call letters. While owned by Bill Bro, it was country station WTXR "94X" from 1984 to 1986; followed by adult contemporary "Magic 94"; then satellite driven oldies as WBZM with Jim Zippo in the morning; easy listening WQEZ "EZ94FM"; and finally an audio simulcast of CNN Headline News under the WRED callsign (for "well read") with studios in the old Pabst Building in Peoria Heights.

=== KZ94.3 ===
By the early 1990s, longtime CHR powerhouse WKZW "KZ-93" had lost its standing in Peoria radio. After trying to hold on to its heritage as "the new KZ-93", the owners of 93.3 finally discarded the name and callsign that had defined the station since late 1977, and switched to adult contemporary with the nickname "Mix 93.3" and the callsign WMXP in April 1994. That same year, owners of then-number-one WXCL-FM, Kelly Communications in Peoria, bought 94.3 from Bro. On August 8, 1994, Kelly picked up the CHR format abandoned by 93.3, and in a controversial move unprecedented in Peoria radio, changed 94.3's callsign to WKZW to make it "KZ94.3", playing and advertising "today's hit music" just like before on 93.3 FM.

KZ94.3 evolved into an adult CHR format that lived in the shadow of its 93.3 predecessor throughout its tenure in the format. Former KZ-93 personality Andy Masur was the first program director and morning host. By the end of the format's tenure on 94.3, the airstaff included Jesse James in the morning; local comedian Brett Erickson, Keith Berry, and Denyse Haynak in middays; Kevin Ross, Jack Shell in afternoons; and Jeff Williams at night.

=== A decade of change ===
In September 1997, the station changed call letters to WFXF as "94-3 The Fox", a classic rock station with Howard Stern in the morning. In June 1999, WFXF moved to 102.3 FM; the format was replaced on 94.3 with a short-lived ABC Radio satellite-driven Hot AC format called "Kiss 94 FM" under the WKSO call sign with veteran Peoria broadcaster/programmer (former WIRL/WKZW/WXCL) Lee Malcolm at the helm. Since "Kiss", 94.3 had changed ownership from Kelly to AAA Entertainment in 2000, and in October of that year, and flipped to all-1980s music as "Channel 94-3" under the WCNL call sign. In August 2001, the station flipped to a simulcast with 96.5 FM as "The Point", a Hot AC station with Bob and Sheri in the morning. AAA sold the station in early 2003 back to Kelly, and in January 2003, the station became WPMJ, a Smooth Jazz station as, once again, "Magic 94.3". In September 2006, WPMJ became "94-3: Peoria's True Oldies Channel", joining ABC Radio Networks as an affiliate of Scott Shannon's True Oldies Channel, after WPBG shifted to classic hits.

=== Sign-off and restart ===
On October 2, 2008, WPMJ, along with sister station 1350 WOAM Peoria, Illinois, went dark after owner Kelly Communications could not find a buyer or investor for the stations. Company owner Bob Kelly said he was still seeking funding and expected the stations to be off the air for "probably" 6 to 12 months. The stations returned to the air just short of a year later, in September 2009. A month later, Kelly sold WPMJ for $620,000 and applied to assign the WPMJ license by itself to CRCI, L.L.C., controlled by Allen C. Drake of El Paso, Illinois, a project coordinator for Catholic radio station WSOG in Spring Valley, Illinois, that itself controls numerous other stations in Central Illinois. The FCC approved the assignment on November 12, 2009 and the transfer was completed on 4 January 2011.

The station's Spring Bay tower collapsed on February 13, 2011, during a blizzard; the station went silent and received special temporary authority to operate from an existing tower near the former Illinois Route 174 in northwest Peoria.

=== Covenant Network ===
On March 3, 2021, CRCI, L.L.C., filed to donate WPMJ to the Covenant Network of St. Louis, which operates a network of Catholic radio stations. The donation was consummated on May 28.
