= Peoria Heights Community Unit School District 325 =

School district in Peoria County, Illinois, United States

Coordinates: 40.76°N 89.57°W

Peoria Heights Unit School District 325

Location
- Peoria Heights and part of Peoria, Illinois United States

District information
- Type: Unit
- Grades: Pre-K–12
- Established: March 17, 1969
- Superintendent: Eric M. Heath
- Schools: 1 high school; 1 grade school

Other information
- Website: ph325.org

Peoria Heights Community Unit District 325 is the unit school district of Peoria Heights and an adjacent area of Peoria along Illinois Route 29 and the Illinois River to the north, all in Peoria County, Illinois. It has one high school — Peoria Heights High School — and one grade school, both the same site.

== History ==
District 325 was organized on March 17, 1969 from the territory of two elementary districts — Gardener School District 112 and Peoria Heights School District 120 — and the remaining territory of Richwoods Community High School District 312.

=== Old districts ===
Gardener School District 112 was District #2 of Richwoods Township under the 19th century numbering. Its first school location was known as Stafford School and was a log cabin. The second site was bought in 1874. The first school on that site was a one-room frame building, which lasted for about 30 years. Its replacement was expanded in 1947.

Peoria Heights School District 120 was District #10 of Richwoods Township under the 19th century numbering. It also started in a log cabin, called Richwoods Academy, on what is now the corner of Lake Avenue and Prospect Road. The second site was a frame building built in 1882 south of the railroad track on the east side of what is now Prospect Road. The third site was Kelly Avenue School, which started in 1896 in a new, one-room schoolhouse with a bell tower. The second classroom was added in around 1898, and a third in 1903. This frame schoolhouse was moved to the back of the lot when the brick Kelly Avenue School, with eight classrooms and a basement, was built in 1916. The old frame schoolhouse was used as the Peoria Heights Congregational Church, then as Masonic Grandview Lodge 1112 until they erected their own brick building at Prospect Road and Division Street in 1950. The frame building was torn down in 1953. An additional school, Monroe Avenue School, opened in 1954.

Richwoods Community High School District 312 opened Richwoods Community High School in 1957. In November 1964, the high school's land was annexed into the city of Peoria and into Peoria Public Schools District 150. Resulting court cases gave control of the high school to District 150 in 1967.

=== District 325 ===
Peoria Heights High School was built in 1971.

Around 1999, a new Peoria Heights Grade School was built next to the high school. Kelly Avenue School was torn down and replaced with a strip mall, and Monroe Avenue School became a private middle school.

== Elementary schools ==
- Peoria Heights Grade School

== High schools ==
- Peoria Heights High School

== See also ==
- Richwoods High School
- Richwoods Township, Peoria County, Illinois
