= Peoria High School (Peoria, Illinois) =

Coordinates: 40°42′25″N 89°35′58″W

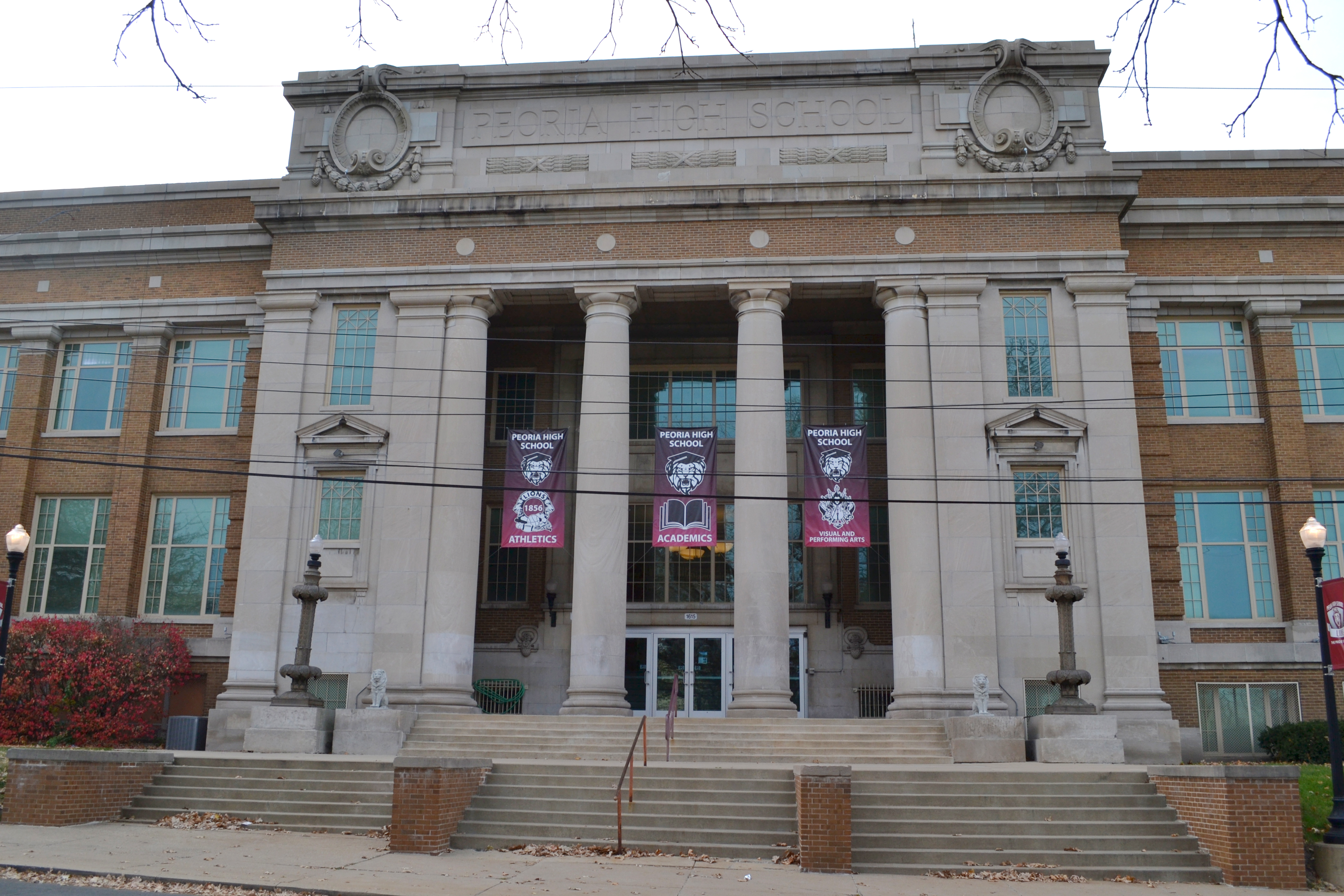

Location
- 1615 N. North Street; Peoria, Illinois 61604; United States

Information
- School type: Public, High School
- Status: Open
- School district: Peoria Public Schools
- Superintendent: Sharon Kherat
- Principal: Shaun McGinnes
- Teaching staff: 76.69 (FTE)
- Student to teacher ratio: 19.34
- Campus type: Urban
- Colors: Maroon; Black
- Athletics: IHSA
- Athletics conference: Big Twelve
- Team name: Lions
- Newspaper: The Opinion
- Website: Official website

Peoria High School is a public high school in Peoria, Illinois. Peoria High School was established in 1856 and is the second oldest continually operating high school west of the Allegheny Mountains after Evansville Central High School in Indiana. Peoria High is located at 1615 N. North Street and moved to this location in 1916. Peoria High School is commonly referred to as "Central" to distinguish it from Richwoods and Manual, and it is centrally located in Peoria. Peoria is the only city in the Peoria metro area with multiple high schools. The motto is the "Pride of the City". It is a part of Peoria Public Schools.

== History ==
=== 1800s ===
In 1856, the school opened on the second floor of the Peoria Female Academy. Classes were held in this building for five years until the first location, at Fourth and Fisher streets near the present-day Civic Center, opened in 1861.

Lucetta Howell was the first valedictorian in 1858.

The name Peoria High became official in 1882. A second location was built at Monroe and Fayette Streets due to rising enrollment. This location was demolished to build I-74.

In 1889, the first student newspaper, The High School Opinion, was established with Julia Proctor as its first editor. It is the oldest continuously running student newspaper in Illinois and currently publishes quarterly.

=== 1900s ===
In 1912, the school board voted to build a new school on North Street. The current building opened on September 11, 1916. It was designed by Peoria architect Frederic Klein, who also designed Madison Theatre, the Japanese bridge at Bradley Park, and pavilions in Glen Oak Park and Grand View Park.

=== 2000s ===
The school had a 150th all-school reunion and celebration in June 2006 at the Peoria Civic Center.

== Sports ==
Peoria High had one of the first football teams in the area and played Illinois Wesleyan's college team. Peoria high won the first Illinois state championship for basketball in 1908. They also won the first state track and field championship in May 1893.

Peoria High is a member of the Big Twelve Conference (Illinois) in athletics, and the school mascot is the Lions. The school mascot was the Maroons until the late 1940s when it was changed. The school colors are maroon, black, and white. Their longtime rivals are the Peoria Manual Rams.

Illinois High School Association State Championships
Sport	Class	Year
Boys Basketball	N/A	1908
Boys Basketball	2A	1977
Boys Basketball	2A	2003
Boys Basketball	2A	2004
Boys Basketball	3A	2012
Boys Football	5A	2016
Speech	N/A	1978

== Notable alumni ==
- Harry Bay (1878–1952), professional baseball player
- Marques Cox (born 1999), NFL football player
- John Dailey (1867–1929), Illinois State Senator and Representative
- Jon Daker (1939–2022, attended but did not graduate), viral video star known for a 1990 video of him singing in an Easter church recital at First United Methodist Church
- Edward Fitzsimmons Dunne (1853–1937, Class of 1871), 38th Mayor of Chicago and 24th Governor of Illinois
- Philip José Farmer (1918–2009, Class of 1936), writer best known for his Riverworld series of science fiction novels and who also wrote pastiches of famous pulp-fiction characters, including a biography of Tarzan
- Harry Frazee (1880–1929), theatrical impresario, owner of Boston Red Sox who sold Babe Ruth to the New York Yankees
- Betty Friedan (1921–2006, Class of 1938), activist and author of The Feminine Mystique
- Danny Goodwin (b. 1953), former MLB player (California Angels, Minnesota Twins, Oakland Athletics) first player from a Historically Black University to be inducted into the National College Baseball Hall of Fame
- Debora Green (b. 1951, Class of 1969, Co-Valedictorian), physician convicted of murdering her two children
- John Grier Hibben (1861–1933), academic who succeeded Woodrow Wilson as President of Princeton University
- A. J. Guyton (b. 1978, Class of 1996), NBA player for Chicago Bulls and Golden State Warriors
- Ralph Lawler (b. 1938), television and radio play-by-play announcer, best known as the long-time voice of the Los Angeles Clippers of the NBA
- Shaun Livingston (b. 1985, Class of 2004), former professional basketball player and executive for the Golden State Warriors: Brooklyn Nets, Los Angeles Clippers, Oklahoma City Thunder, Washington Wizards, Miami Heat, Charlotte Bobcats, Milwaukee Bucks, Warriors, Houston Rockets. Won four championships with the Warriors: three as a player and one as an executive
- Annie Malone (1869–1957), African American entrepreneur and philanthropist
- Howard Maple (1903–1970), former MLB and NFL player (Washington Senators and Chicago Cardinals)
- Robert Michel, (1923–2017, Class of 1940), U.S. Congressman, 1957-1995
- Richard Pryor, (1940–2005), African American stand-up comedian, actor, and writer
- Jim Robertson (1928–2015), former MLB player (Philadelphia Athletics)
- Matt Savoie (b. 1980, Class of 1998), Olympic figure skater who skated during the 2006 Winter Olympics in Turin, Italy.
- John Shalikashvili (1936–2011, Class of 1954), U.S. Army general and Chairman of the Joint Chiefs of Staff (1993–1997)
- Dick Weik (1927–1991), former MLB player Washington Senators, Cleveland Indians, Detroit Tigers, inducted into the Greater Peoria Sports Hall of Fame in 2016.
- Frank "Spig" Wead (1895–1947) Navy Commander, John Wayne played Wead in the movie "The Wings of Eagles".
