= WMBD =

WMBD may refer to:

- WMBD (AM), a radio station (1470 AM) licensed to Peoria, Illinois, United States
  - W262BY, an FM radio translator station (100.3 FM) licensed to Peoria, Illinois, United States, which rebroadcasts WMBD (AM) and is informally referred to as WMBD-FM
- WMBD-TV, a television station (channel 26 digital/31 virtual) licensed to Peoria, Illinois, United States
- WPBG, a radio station (93.3 FM) licensed to Peoria, Illinois, United States, which held the WMBD-FM callsign from 1947 to 1977
