= Upper Peoria Lake =

Section of the Illinois River, US

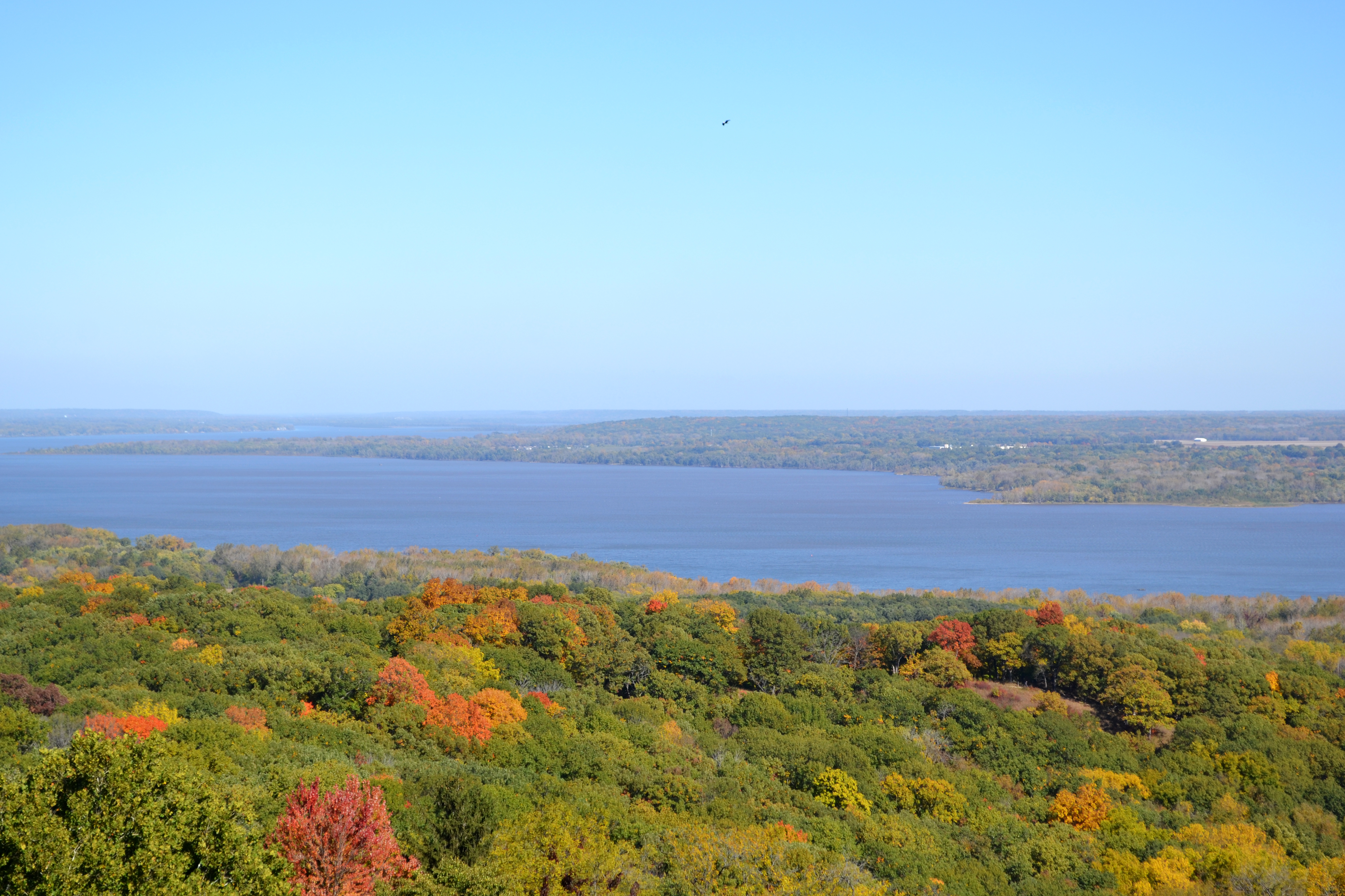
- View of Upper Peoria Lake from the Peoria Heights water tower observation deck

- Location within Illinois Location within the United States
- Location: Peoria / Woodford / Tazewell counties, Illinois, US
- Coordinates: 40°48′24″N 89°33′4″W
- Primary inflows: Illinois River
- Primary outflows: Illinois River
- Basin countries: United States
- Surface area: 6,256.7 hectares (15,461 acres)

Upper Peoria Lake is a section of the Illinois River primarily between Peoria County and Woodford County, Illinois, United States. The lake runs from South Rome to Peoria Heights, with Spring Bay and the Detweiller Marina area of Peoria near the middle. Just north of Peoria Heights, it empties through a narrow part of the Illinois River into the smaller Peoria Lake, sometimes called Lower Peoria Lake, at approximately river mile 166.5.

== Geology ==
The Upper Peoria Lake originated during the Woodfordian substage of the Wisconsin glaciation. It is part of the Bloomington moraine. Upper Peoria Lake is a remnant of old Glacial Lake Illinois, which formed behind the moraine.

Due to the flat stream bed, the water moves slowly, allowing sediment to settle at the bottom.

=== Restoration ===
Since 1903, the lake has lost approximately 68% of its original volume and the average depth has been reduced from 8.1 ft (2.5 m) to 2.6 ft (0.79 m). Sedimentation and the soft bottom of the lake are not conducive for aquatic plants, which attract waterfowl.

In July 1990, the Peoria Lake Habitat Rehabilitation and Enhancement Project, a joint project between the U.S. Army Corps of Engineers, U.S. Fish and Wildlife Service, and Illinois Department of Natural Resources, worked on the northernmost end of the Upper Peoria Lake. This project achieved:

- Constructed the Barrier and Overburden Islands and dredged approximately 229,366.457 m^{3} (8,100,000.0 cu ft) of sediment
- Excavated a channel in the East River to remove a silt plug
- Constructed a rock closure to reduce sediment from the northern boundary with Goose Lake
- Constructed approximately 18,585 ft (5,665 m) of low level levees, 3 water control structures, and a pump station
- Planted select vegetation to enhance the wetland habitat

== Fauna ==
Pollution has been a significant factor in decreasing levels of wildlife.

=== Fish ===
Several species of fish are listed by the Illinois Department of Natural Resources for Upper Peoria Lake.

Fish species in Upper Peoria Lake
=== Species ===	=== Rank ===
Bluegill	Excellent
Channel catfish	Excellent
Crappie	Good
Flathead catfish	Very Good
Largemouth bass	Excellent
Sauger	Excellent
Smallmouth bass	Improving
Walleye	Excellent

=== Waterfowl ===
Upper Peoria Lake is a notable wildlife refuge for migrating waterfowl.

== Recreation ==
The lake is currently a regional tourist attraction and is used for practice of many watersports.

Several public lands border the Peoria Lake, including:

- Grand View Park
- Al Fresco Park
- Poplar Lane Park
- Detweiller Park
- Gaylord Wildlife Area
- Robert Rutherford Wildlife Sanctuary
- Woodford State and Fish Wildlife Area
- Spring Bay Park
- Spring Bay Fen Nature Preserve

Other notable landmarks include:

- Peoria Waterworks
- Grandview Drive
- Shore Acres Clubhouse
- Illinois Valley Yacht and Canoe Club
- East Peoria Boat and Recreation
