= Peoria Heights, Illinois =

Peoria Heights
- Village
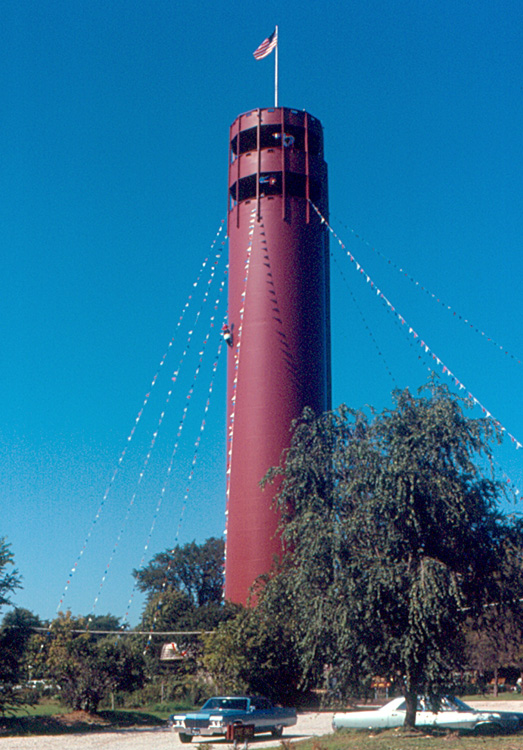
- Tower Park water tower, 1970

- Location of Peoria Heights in Peoria County, Illinois.
- Coordinates: 40°45′05″N 89°34′13″W
- Country: United States
- State: Illinois
- Counties: Peoria, Woodford, Tazewell
- Township: Richwoods, Spring Bay, Fondulac
- Founded: 1898, as Prospect Heights
- Renamed: 1901, as Peoria Heights

Government
  - Mayor: Matthew H. Wigginton

Area
  - Total: 2.87 sq mi (7.44 km^{2})
  - Land: 2.49 sq mi (6.46 km^{2})
  - Water: 0.38 sq mi (0.98 km^{2})
- Elevation: 784 ft (239 m)

Population (2020)
  - Total: 5,908
  - Estimate (2024): 5,802 ▼
  - Density: 2,370.3/sq mi (915.16/km^{2})
- Time zone: UTC-6 (CST)
  - Summer (DST): UTC-5 (CDT)
- ZIP code: 61616
- Area code: 309
- FIPS code: 17-59026
- GNIS feature ID: 2399652
- Website: www.peoriaheights.org/home

Peoria Heights is a village lying in Peoria County in the U.S. state of Illinois. As of the 2020 census, Peoria Heights had a population of 5,908. Peoria Heights is a suburb of Peoria, is sometimes referred to as Uptown, and is surrounded by the city except for its eastern boundary on Peoria Lake, a relatively wider section of the Illinois River. It is part of the Peoria metropolitan area.

== History ==
The area was developed in 1898 under the name Prospect Heights Land Company. When it was incorporated, it was called Prospect Heights. Three years later, they changed it to Peoria Heights to avoid confusion with the Prospect Heights community near Chicago.

The Prospect Heights Hotel hosted a Hungarian orchestra that played every night as the house band. The hotel burned down in the summer of 1894.

The village celebrated its centennial in 1998.

== Geography ==
According to the 2010 census, Peoria Heights has a total area of 6.969 square miles (18.05 km^{2}), of which 2.65 square miles (6.86 km^{2}) (or 38.03%) is land and 4.319 square miles (11.19 km^{2}) (or 61.97%) is water. That most of the village is water is due to the fact that most of Upper Peoria Lake lies within its boundaries; this can be seen on official state maps.

Topographically, the village can be roughly divided into three zones: the Illinois River floodplain, the bluff, and the plateau. While its eastern border is fairly regular with the river's edge, the rest of its municipal border, with Peoria, is quite irregular and convoluted.

According to the Census Bureau records through 2007, Peoria Heights lies in three counties (Peoria, Woodford, and Tazewell). While neither Tazewell nor Woodford counties consider Peoria Heights to be within their jurisdiction, the state of Illinois does show that across Peoria Lake from the rest of the village, a small, uninhabited area exists both within Peoria Heights and Woodford County. However, the Census Bureau claim that Peoria Heights is also within Tazewell County is unsupported by any state, county, or municipal websites.

=== Landmarks ===
The village is perhaps most noteworthy for its Grand View Drive, a residential street on top of the bluff overlooking the Illinois River with many elegant homes and a country club. The road also has several panoramic look-outs of the river and beyond into Tazewell and Woodford counties as well as a park with a children's playground, picnic area, and baseball diamond. Teddy Roosevelt purportedly called the street the "World's Most Beautiful Drive" when he visited the Peoria area in October 1910; WMBD, a local radio and TV station, gets its call letters from Roosevelt's expression.

The town is also recognized by its distinct, red water tower. One can ascend the tower in an elevator and survey a sizable portion of Peoria, Tazewell, and Woodford counties from three observational decks. The tower has a 6 ft. wooden woodpecker on the side. The tower forms the nucleus of Peoria Heights Tower Park. Tower Park is a centerpiece of the community which underwent sweeping and controversial renovations in 2002, costing the Village nearly $800,000. The nearby downtown business area includes upscale restaurants and shops. In addition to this water tower there is another modern tower on Toledo Avenue colored white with the Peoria Heights logo; it was formerly painted a distinctive Red, White, and Blue (the school district colors).

A bronze sculpture of Lincoln's head by Gutzon Borglum is near the Village Hall within Tower Park.

On and below the bluff, there are several parks and recreational areas. Forest Park Nature Center is a nature reserve on the bluff containing several miles of trails of varying difficulty and the village's only native prairie restoration site. The Pimiteoui Trail links up Forest Park Nature Center's visitor center with Grandview Drive. Bielfeldt Park is a more traditional park with sports fields, a paved trail, children's playground, and picnic area. The southern terminus of Grandview also sports a park with swings, slide, and pavilion. The Rock Island Greenway has a section through Peoria Heights.

The Duryea Motor Wagon Company once had a production facility nearby (the reason for the aforementioned visit by Teddy Roosevelt). The town was also the site of a brewery for Pabst Blue Ribbon from 1934 to 1982. The closing of the Pabst brewery in 1982 had a severe impact on the local economy and population, from which the community has never completely recovered. The Peoria City mass transit company, CityLink, offers a History Trolley, which starts its tour in the Prospect Commercial Sector.

The Peoria Heights Public Library is located off Glen and is not far from Grandview Drive or Downtown Peoria Heights.

== Demographics ==
Historical population
Census	Pop.	Note	%±
1900	309		—
1910	582		88.3%
1920	1,111		90.9%
1930	3,279		195.1%
1940	4,376		33.5%
1950	5,425		24.0%
1960	7,064		30.2%
1970	7,943		12.4%
1980	7,453		−6.2%
1990	6,930		−7.0%
2000	6,635		−4.3%
2010	6,156		−7.2%
2020	5,908		−4.0%
U.S. Decennial Census

=== 2020 census ===
As of the 2020 census, Peoria Heights had a population of 5,908. The median age was 38.2 years. 19.4% of residents were under the age of 18 and 16.1% of residents were 65 years of age or older. For every 100 females there were 96.3 males, and for every 100 females age 18 and over there were 93.3 males age 18 and over.

99.8% of residents lived in urban areas, while 0.2% lived in rural areas.

There were 2,836 households in Peoria Heights, of which 22.5% had children under the age of 18 living in them. Of all households, 30.6% were married-couple households, 27.0% were households with a male householder and no spouse or partner present, and 33.1% were households with a female householder and no spouse or partner present. About 43.3% of all households were made up of individuals and 12.0% had someone living alone who was 65 years of age or older.

There were 3,127 housing units, of which 9.3% were vacant. The homeowner vacancy rate was 2.6% and the rental vacancy rate was 8.6%.

Racial composition as of the 2020 census
Race	Number	Percent
White	4,816	81.5%
Black or African American	482	8.2%
American Indian and Alaska Native	9	0.2%
Asian	63	1.1%
Native Hawaiian and Other Pacific Islander	0	0.0%
Some other race	100	1.7%
Two or more races	438	7.4%
Hispanic or Latino (of any race)	258	4.4%

=== 2000 census ===
As of the 2000 census, there were 6,635 people, 3,122 households, and 1,657 families residing in the village. The population density was 2,509.0 inhabitants per square mile (968.7/km^{2}). There were 3,331 housing units at an average density of 1,259.6 per square mile (486.3/km^{2}). The racial makeup of the village was 92.89% White, 3.45% African American, 0.32% Native American, 1.07% Asian, 1.06% from other races, and 1.22% from two or more races. Hispanic or Latino of any race were 1.90% of the population.

There were 3,122 households, out of which 22.0% had children under the age of 18 living with them, 39.5% were married couples living together, 9.7% had a female householder with no husband present, and 46.9% were non-families. 39.2% of all households were made up of individuals, and 12.4% had someone living alone who was 65 years of age or older. The average household size was 2.10 and the average family size was 2.82.

In the village, the population was spread out, with 20.3% under the age of 18, 9.4% from 18 to 24, 31.6% from 25 to 44, 22.8% from 45 to 64, and 16.0% who were 65 years of age or older. The median age was 38 years. For every 100 females, there were 93.9 males. For every 100 females age 18 and over, there were 90.6 males.

The median income for a household in the village was $32,161, and the median income for a family was $42,545. Males had a median income of $33,408 versus $22,000 for females. The per capita income for the village was $20,999. About 6.7% of families and 8.8% of the population were below the poverty line, including 8.3% of those under age 18 and 6.6% of those age 65 or over.

== Government and politics ==
The Village of Peoria Heights is a home rule municipality governed by a Village Board of Trustees form of government. The mayor and the village clerk are each elected at large to a four-year term. The Mayor appoints the Village Treasurer. The Mayor is the chief executive officer of the Village and presides over meetings of the Village Board. With the approval of the Village Board, the Mayor appoints non-elected Village officials. The Village Clerk is the recording officer of the Village, and is responsible for attending all meetings of the Village Board and keeping records of the proceedings. Village Board meetings are the first and third Tuesday of each month.

The Village Board is the legislative body for the village, and consists of six trustees elected for a four-year term. Their terms are staggered, so that half are elected every two years. Members may be elected for an indefinite number of terms. The Village Board formulates policy and enacts local laws, usually in the form of resolutions and ordinances. The Village Board is directly responsible to the citizens of Peoria Heights.

Peoria Heights has a history of non-national political parties. The "Village Party" and the "People's Party" were once prominent in local elections. Today the "Village Party" is defunct and the "People's Party" has lost in the last four elections to Independent candidates.

== Emergency Services ==
Peoria Heights has stand alone Fire and Police Services. The fire department is a volunteer on call service. As of December 2014, EMS services are provided by Advanced Medical Transport.

== Schools ==
- Peoria Heights Community Unit School District 325
- Peoria Heights High School

== Transportation ==
CityLink provides bus service on Routes 2, 12, and 14 connecting Peoria Heights to destinations throughout the Peoria area.
