= Senator Daley =

Senator Daley may refer to:

- John P. Daley (born 1946), Illinois State Senate
- Kevin Daley (politician) (born 1957), Michigan State Senate
- Richard J. Daley (1902–1976), Illinois State Senate
- Richard M. Daley (born 1942), Illinois State Senate
- Ted Daley (born 1966), Minnesota State Senate

== See also ==
- John Dailey (politician) (1867–1929), Illinois State Senate
- Senator Daly (disambiguation)
