= Forest Park Nature Center =

Nature center and forest area in Peoria County, Illinois

Coordinates: 40°45′26″N 89°34′30″W

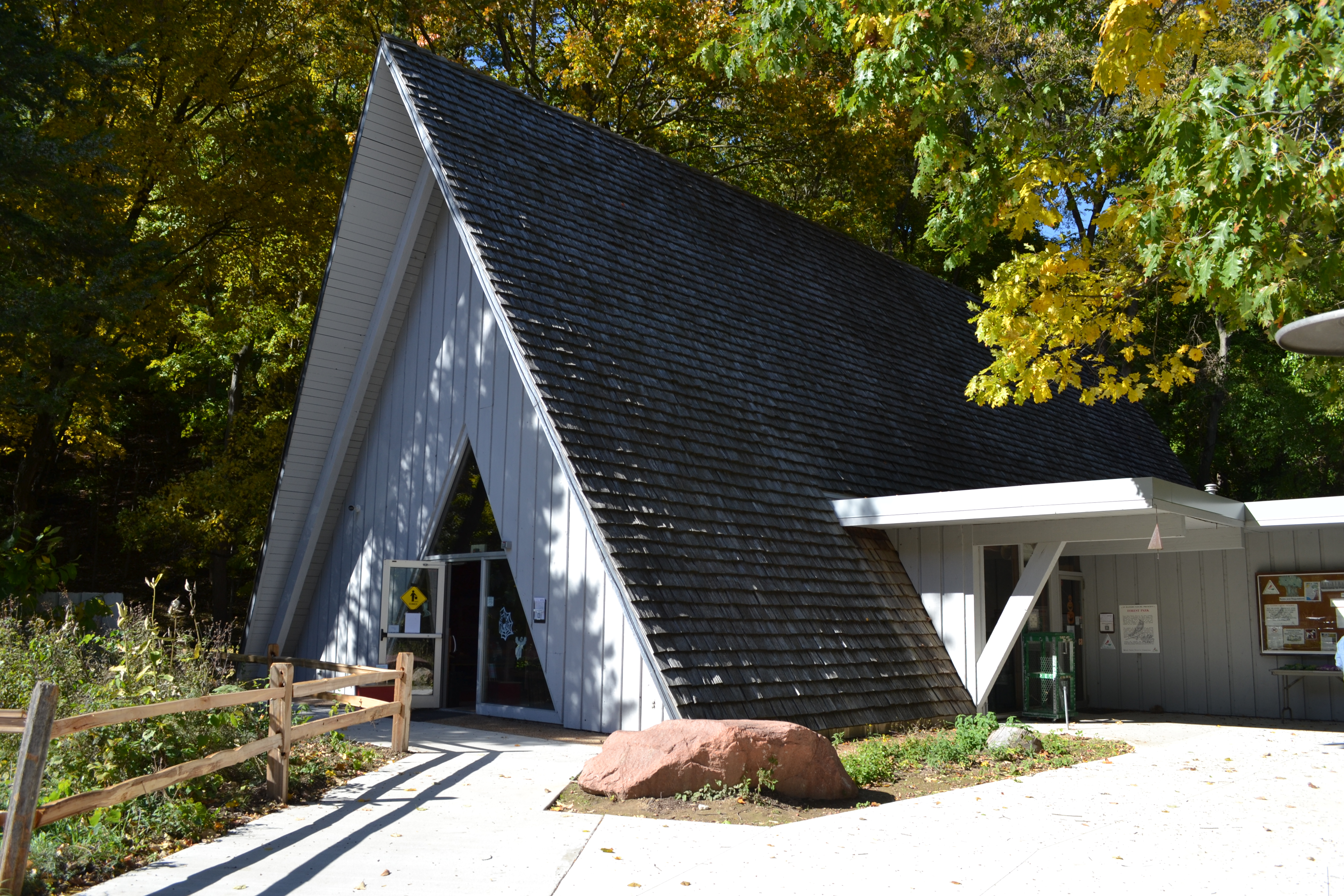
- Interactive map of Forest Park Nature Center
- Type: Nature preserve
- Location: 5809 North Forest Park Drive
- Nearest city: Peoria Heights, Illinois
- Area: 540 acres (220 ha)
- Created: May 1965; 61 years ago
- Operator: Peoria Park District
- Open: Tues - Sat 9:00 AM - 5:00 PM, Sunday 1 - 5 PM; Trails open daily, dawn to dusk
- Hiking trails: 7 miles (11 km)

The Forest Park Nature Center is a staffed nature center in Peoria Heights, a suburb of Peoria, Illinois. The nature center and surrounding parkland is operated by the Peoria Park District to interpret and celebrate the elevational bluffs and oak savannahs of the Peoria Lake watershed, which in CE 1492 was one of the most fertile and productive ecosystems known to humankind.

== Description ==
The Forest Park Nature Center contains a small natural history museum, with an emphasis on oak-hickory synergies on a soil of sandy loess. A model chinquapin oak anchors the museum display. While loess soils are vulnerable to erosion, the root systems of the oaks, hickories, and other trees of the Forest Park ecosystem keep that section of the fragile bluffs from slumping into Lake Peoria. The natural history displays explain the roots of trees, prairie grasses, and flowers, and how the roots of individual plants work together to form a combined root system.

Around the Nature Center, 500 acres (200 hectares) of dedicated parkland (including a parcel granted standing as an Illinois State Nature Preserve) contains 7 miles (11 km) of hiking trails for field observations of the lessons learned in the center. The trails concentrate on the forested woodlands of the Lake Peoria bluffland, with some of the earthen pathways jumping in and out of small, grassy tallgrass prairie openings. Forest Park Nature Center was dedicated in May 1965 as the thirteenth Illinois Nature Preserve.

Along these trails many of Illinois's native species can be seen in their natural habitat. These animals include deer, raccoons, wild turkeys, and squirrels.
