= 1996 McDonald's All-American Boys Game =

American high school basketball game

East	West
120	105
	1st half	2nd half	Total
East	55	65	120
West	55	50	105
- Date: March 31, 1996
- Venue: Pittsburgh Civic Arena, Pittsburgh, PA
- MVP: Shaheen Holloway
- Referees: 1 Tom Lopes; 2 Jackie Loube; 3 John Pugh
- Attendance: 13,411
- Network: CBS

McDonald's All-American

The 1996 McDonald's All-American Boys Game was an all-star basketball game played on Sunday, March 31, 1996 at the Pittsburgh Civic Arena in Pittsburgh, Pennsylvania. The game's rosters featured the best and most highly recruited high school boys graduating in 1996. The game was the 19th annual version of the McDonald's All-American Game first played in 1978.

== 1996 game ==
The game was telecast live by CBS. Ronnie Fields did not play, having suffered an injury in February 1996 that forced him to stay away from the basketball court for a long time. Charles Hathaway was also unable to play. Shaheen Holloway, who was the starting point guard for the East, won the MVP award with 7 points, 8 assists and 6 steals; other players who starred were guard Kobe Bryant (13 points/3 assists), center Vassil Evtimov (the only one to record a double-double with 14 points and 11 rebounds) and bench players Stephen Jackson (East) and Winfred Walton (West) who were the top scorers of the game, tied at 21 points. Of the 22 All-Americans, 12 did not play in the NBA, while 2 were drafted out of high school in the 1996 NBA draft: Kobe Bryant (13th overall pick) and Jermaine O'Neal (17th overall pick). Only Ronnie Fields did not play a single game in the NCAA or the NBA.

=== East roster ===
No.	Name	Height	Weight	Position	Hometown	High school	College of Choice
3	Tim Thomas	6-9	240	F	Paterson, NJ, U.S.	Paterson Catholic	Undecided; Committed later to Villanova.
5	Stephen Jackson	6-7	220	F	Mouth of Wilson, VA, U.S.	Oak Hill Academy	Arizona
6	Jermaine O'Neal	6-11	235	PF	Columbia, SC, U.S.	Eau Claire High School	Undecided (Did not attend)
10	Shaheen Holloway	5-10	171	G	Elizabeth, NJ, U.S.	St. Patrick's	Seton Hall
15	Willie Dersch	6-5	197	G	Queens, NY, U.S.	Holy Cross	Virginia
21	Ed Cota	6-1	177	G	Oakdale, CT, U.S.	St. Thomas More	North Carolina
30	Richard Hamilton	6-6	190	G	Coatesville, PA, U.S.	Coatesville	Connecticut
32	Nate James	6-6	195	F	Frederick, MD, U.S.	St. John's at Prospect Hall	Duke
33	Kobe Bryant	6-6	200	G	Ardmore, PA, U.S.	Lower Merion	Undecided (Did not attend)
54	Vassil Evtimov	6-9	235	F / C	Long Island, NY, U.S.	Long Island Lutheran	North Carolina
N/A	Charles Hathaway	6-10	250	C	Nashville, TN, U.S.	Hillwood	Tennessee

=== West roster ===
No.	Name	Height	Weight	Position	Hometown	High school	College of Choice
4	Glendon Alexander	6-4	215	G	Carrollton, TX, U.S.	Newman Smith	Arkansas
5	Corey Benjamin	6-6	200	G	Fontana, CA, U.S.	Fontana	Oregon State
10	Mike Bibby	6-2	190	G	Phoenix, AZ, U.S.	Shadow Mountain	Arizona
24	Mateen Cleaves	6-2	205	G	Flint, MI, U.S.	Flint Northern	Michigan State
32	Mike Robinson	6-6	210	G / F	Peoria, IL, U.S.	Richwoods	Purdue
33	Loren Woods	7-1	245	C	St. Louis, MO, U.S.	Cardinal Ritter	Wake Forest
34	Winfred Walton	6-9	240	F	Detroit, MI, U.S.	Pershing	Syracuse
40	Jason Collier	7-0	260	C	Springfield, OH, U.S.	Catholic Central	Indiana
50	Lester Earl	6-9	240	F	Baton Rouge, LA, U.S.	Glen Oaks	LSU
52	Jerald Brown	6-7	225	F	Houston, TX, U.S.	Aldine	Texas A&M
N/A	Ronnie Fields	6-3	198	G	Chicago, IL, U.S.	Farragut Academy	DePaul (Did not attend)

=== Coaches ===
The East team was coached by:

- Head Coach John Miller of Blackhawk High School (Beaver Falls, Pennsylvania)
- Asst Coach Rick Bell of Peters Township High School (McMurray, Pennsylvania)
- Asst Coach Don Graham of North Catholic High School (Pittsburgh, Pennsylvania)

The West team was coached by:

- Head Coach Nate Harris of Booker T. Washington High School (Tulsa, Oklahoma)
- Asst Coach Levi Brown of Booker T. Washington High School (Tulsa, Oklahoma)

== All-American Week ==
=== Contest winners ===
- The 1996 Slam Dunk contest was won by Lester Earl.
- The 1996 3-point shoot-out was won by Nate James.
