= WVBP =

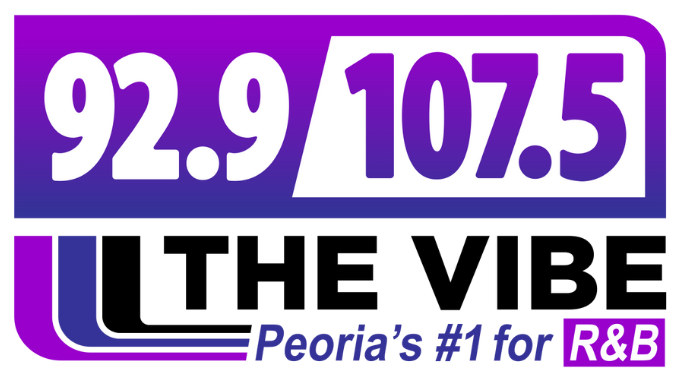
- Peoria, Illinois; United States
- Broadcast area: Peoria metropolitan area
- Frequency: 1350 kHz
- Branding: 92.9/107.5 The Vibe

Programming
- Language: English
- Format: Urban adult contemporary

Ownership
- Owner: Spoon River Media LLC

History
- First air date: April 27, 1947
- Former call signs: WEEK (1947–1960); WAAP (1960–1965); WXCL (1965–1994); WOAM (1994–1999); WTAZ (1999–2001); WOAM (2001–2026)
- Call sign meaning: "Vibe Peoria"

Technical information
- Licensing authority: FCC
- Facility ID: 33878
- Class: B
- Power: 1,000 watts
- Transmitter coordinates: 40°35′41.1″N 89°35′40.4″W
- Translators: 92.9 W225DC (Peoria); 107.5 W298BH (Peoria)

Links
- Public license information: Public file; LMS
- Webcast: Listen live
- Website: vibepeoria.com

WVBP (1350 kHz) is a AM radio station licensed for Peoria, Illinois, that broadcasts an urban adult contemporary format.

== History ==
The station signed on as WEEK April 27, 1947. Peoria's TV channel 25 was started by the owners of 1350, and to this day channel 25 retains the callsign WEEK-TV, but 1350 itself has since switched callsigns several times.

Other call letters have included WAAP, WXCL, and WTAZ.

The station was most successful as WXCL with a country music format adopted in 1965. Eventually WXCL was simulcast on 104.9, a station in Pekin, Illinois, that changed its callsign to WXCL-FM.

Personalities when the station was country music station WXCL included Don Elliot, Lee Ranson, Chuck Urban, Bill Bro, Paul Jackson, (Part Timer Arlen Horn), and Jim Crowley, Steve Young, Doug Adams, Tweed Scott, and Dave Hinkley.

Bob Kelly bought the station in 1986.

In 1994 the simulcast was dropped, with WXCL-FM 104.9 keeping the callsign and country format, and 1350 becoming WOAM with the Music of Your Life format. Veteran Peoria native/broadcaster Cliff Shell hosted a highly rated morning drive show for its first two years. WOAM also became the highest rated AM station in Peoria during its second year on the air. In 1999 the station flipped to talk as (then) sister station WTAZ in Morton, Illinois) was moved from 102.3 FM to 1350 AM. In September 2001 the WTAZ call letters and format were dropped and WOAM returned using the Timeless Classics syndicated adult standards format. In 2007 WOAM switched to Dial Global's Adult Standards syndicated format. By the time WOAM first went dark, its only local show was morning show Breakfast with Royce and Roger.

On October 2, 2008, WOAM, along with sister station 94.3 WPMJ in Chillicothe, Illinois, went dark. Company owner Bob Kelly said he was still seeking funding and expects the stations to be off the air for "probably" 6 to 12 months, but that he did not intend to declare bankruptcy. WOAM resumed operations in September 2009, but was approved to go silent again in January 2010.

After briefly returning to the air in early 2011 with automated broadcasts, it was purchased by Nelson Broadcasting, Inc. With the transfer of ownership, WOAM returned to the air in late July 2011, with the morning Breakfast with Royce and Roger returning in early August 2011. Staffing cuts ended Breakfast with Royce and Roger again at the end of September 2012.

WOAM's license was assigned to American Education Foundation, Inc. effective January 1, 2013, for no consideration.

American Educational Foundation applied in November 2024 to modify its facilities to change the community of license from Peoria to Tremont in Tazewell County, and to switch to a non-directional antenna broadcasting 260 watts during the day and 21 watts at night. The application was granted on May 8, 2025.

In September 2025, an application was filed with the FCC to sell the station along with FM translators W225DC and W298BH to Spoon River Media LLC, for $65,000. The application was approved on December 3, 2025 and Spoon River Media took over the station on January 12, 2026.

On January 19, 2026, WOAM changed formats from adult standards/MOR to urban adult contemporary, branded as "92.9/107.5 The Vibe", and simulcasting on translators 92.9 W225DC and 107.5 W298BH in Peoria. The station also applied to change its callsign to WVBP effective January 27, 2026.
