= Mike Robinson (basketball, born 1976) =

American basketball player and coach

Personal information
- Born: December 31, 1976 (age 49) Peoria, Illinois, U.S.
- Listed height: 6 ft 6 in (1.98 m)
- Listed weight: 200 lb (91 kg)

Career information
- High school: Richwoods (Peoria, Illinois)
- College: Purdue (1996–2000)
- NBA draft: 2000: undrafted
- Position: Guard

Career highlights
- McDonald's All-American (1996)

Michael Westley Robinson (born December 31, 1976) is a retired American professional basketball player and a high school basketball coach. He played professionally for teams in the United States and Argentina.

Robinson graduated from Richwoods High School in Peoria, Illinois, as a three time all-state selection and the Gatorade Player of the Year for the Midwest in 1996. Robinson would score 2,944 career points and play in the McDonald's All-American game.

Robinson attended Purdue University, when he played basketball on two Sweet 16 teams and one Elite 8 squad in March Madness during his four years. His college scoring total was 1,322. He was also arrested twice during his illustrious career. After graduating from Purdue, Robinson competed professionally both in the United States and Argentina.

In 2018 Robinson won a state championship as a high school coach in Virginia, leading the South County Stallions to the Class 6 title. Robinson is married to Michelle Duhart who played for the 1999 champion Purdue women's basketball team.
