= My name is Jon Daker =

Viral video

"My Name is John Daker" [sic] is an internet viral video consisting of an excerpt from a 1990 public-access television program broadcast on WTVP in Peoria, Illinois. It has been viewed more than 5 million times on YouTube. In the video, an amateur singer, Jon Daker, is accompanied by a pianist named Reva Cooper Unsicker as he sings renditions of "Christ the Lord Is Risen Today" and "That's Amore." While performing he uses unusual phrasing, sings in a pseudo-operatic voice, and forgets song lyrics.

== Background ==
The video was uploaded to YouTube and EBaum's World in 2006. Daker's first name was misspelled in the original subtitles, so he is sometimes referred to as "John Daker."

Jon Graham Daker was born November 19, 1939, in Peoria. Daker grew up on the West Bluff and attended Peoria High School, earning his GED later. He enjoyed music and played the harmonica. He died on February 20, 2022.

The recital was a public-access program on WTVP. The organist at First United Methodist Church, Reva Singley Cooper Unsicker, was the accompanist. Unsicker taught voice, piano, and organ lessons until her death in 1995.

There are several other video clips from the recital of different singers, a six-person choir, and a comedian on YouTube. George Stanton, Bob Spencer, Margie Hicks, and others sang. Pearl Gross delivered a comedic set.

On November 17, 2014, a video entitled "JOHN DAKER STRIKES AGAIN" was uploaded to YouTube, depicting Daker at a local Ford dealership. The video clip obtained over 131,000 views. The user posted two subsequent videos on November 25, 2014 and April 24, 2015.

Unconfirmed rumors of other Daker TV appearances from the era persisted until a different version of "Christ the Lord is Risen Today" surfaced on YouTube in August 2025, along with a rendition of "Carolina in the Morning" and two versions of "The Woody Woodpecker Song."

== Cultural impact ==
In 2006, the video was featured on VH1's show Web Junk 20. In 2016, the Blue Man Group, who are fans of Daker, invited him to meet with them backstage when they were playing a show in Peoria. In 2016, Bill Burr did a segment on his Monday Morning Podcast about the video.

In November 2018, Heather Schopp befriended Daker when she was volunteering to play piano at the assisted-living facility where he lived. She received permission from Daker's niece to post updates on a fan page, The John Daker Experience, with over 2,900 followers. Schopp wrote, "He was aware of it, and he assumed the best of all of us. He had no interest in any more details, in benefiting monetarily from his fame, in telling others about it. It was enough for him to know he was loved, and to continue making people laugh."
