= WSWT =

- Peoria, Illinois; United States
- Broadcast area: Peoria metropolitan area
- Frequency: 106.9 MHz
- Branding: Mix 106.9

Programming
- Format: Adult contemporary
- Affiliations: Premiere Networks

Ownership
- Owner: Midwest Communications; (Midwest Communications, Inc.)
- Sister stations: WIRL; WMBD; WPBG; WKZF; WXCL

History
- First air date: 1967; 59 years ago
- Former call signs: WJSI (1965–1966); WIVC (1966–1971); WUHN (1971–1972)
- Call sign meaning: "Sweet" (former branding)

Technical information
- Licensing authority: FCC
- Facility ID: 13041
- Class: B
- ERP: 50,000 watts
- HAAT: 146 meters (479 ft)
- Transmitter coordinates: 40°43′22.1″N 89°30′40.3″W

Links
- Public license information: Public file; LMS
- Webcast: Listen live
- Website: mix1069.com

WSWT (106.9 FM; "Mix 106.9") is a commercial radio station broadcasting an adult contemporary radio format, switching to Christmas music for much of November and December. It is licensed to Peoria, Illinois, and is owned by Midwest Communications, Inc. The radio studios and offices are on Fulton Street in Peoria.

WSWT has an effective radiated power (ERP) of 50,000 watts, the current maximum for Illinois radio stations. The transmitter is on Grosenbach Road in Washington, Illinois.

== History ==
The station was first licensed on January 24, 1967, as WIVC. It changed its call sign WUHN on January 7, 1971; and to WSWT on July 31, 1972.

For many years, WSWT aired a beautiful music format, calling itself "W-Sweet" to go along with its call letters. The station played quarter hour sweeps of soft, instrumental cover versions of popular songs. Walter Thurman was a longtime announcer at the station. Beginning in the 1980s the station gradually evolved into a soft adult contemporary sound and then to the more upbeat adult contemporary format that is the format today.

On December 22, 2014, WSWT announced it would rebrand from "Today's Lite Rock 107" to "Mix 106.9" after Christmas as part of its "New Year, New Name" campaign. That returned the heritage brand to the market for the first time since September 2007, when WXMP (101.1 FM) flipped to oldies as WHPI and rebranded as "Hippie Radio". This is the fourth incarnation for the "Mix" branding in Peoria: it originated on WMXP (93.3 FM) in 1994, resurfaced on WXMP (105.7 FM) in 2003 after a seven-year absence, and then moved to 101.1 in 2006 before the call sign and format were dropped the following year. The rebrand officially took place on December 26. Shortly after the rebrand, the station dropped its weekend 1980s music programming, and shifted its non-Christmas playlist to hot adult contemporary.

On February 4, 2019, Alpha Media announced that it was selling its Peoria cluster to Midwest Communications for $21.6 million. The sale closed on April 30, 2019.

On December 26, 2019, WSWT changed its slogan to "Your Life. Your Music.", and also adopted a new logo.

On December 29, 2023, long time morning show personality and program director Randy Rundle retired after more than 30 years at WSWT.
