= WSOG =

- Spring Valley, Illinois; United States
- Broadcast area: LaSalle-Peru
- Frequency: 88.1 MHz

Programming
- Format: Catholic radio
- Affiliations: EWTN

Ownership
- Owner: Spirit Education Association, Inc.

History
- First air date: 2002

Technical information
- Licensing authority: FCC
- Facility ID: 91823
- Class: A (non-commercial educational)
- ERP: 4,000 watts vertical only
- HAAT: 80 meters
- Transmitter coordinates: 41°17′32.1″N 89°07′59.3″W (NAD83)
- Translator: (see Stations)
- Repeater: (see Stations)

Links
- Public license information: Public file; LMS
- Webcast: 80kb/s MP3
- Website: wsogradio.com

WSOG is an FM broadcasting station on 88.1 MHz at Spring Valley, Illinois. It broadcasts Catholic radio programs, primarily EWTN Radio supplemented with local programs. It is licensed to Spirit Education Association, Inc. and has studios at St. Bede Academy in Peru, Illinois.

== Stations ==
As of October 2009, WSOG uses 5 additional translators, and has applied for 2 more. The Roman Catholic Diocese of Rockford has also applied for other stations.

In addition, as of October 2009, commercial station 94.3 WPMJ Chillicothe, Illinois was in the process of being sold to CRCI, L.L.C., a company controlled by WSOG project coordinator Allen C. Drake of El Paso, Illinois.

Licensed stations running WSOG programming
Fac. ID	Freq.	Callsign	City of license	Licensee	Founded	Tower (NAD83)
91823	88.1	WSOG	Spring Valley	Spirit Education Association	2002	41°17′32.1″N 89°07′59.3″W
145892	94.7	W234AO	El Paso	Spirit Education Association	2006	40°44′31.1″N 89°01′52.3″W
153248	98.9	W201DH	DeKalb	Roman Catholic Diocese of Rockford	2008	41°56′1.0″N 88°44′54.3″W
153339	93.5	W228BZ	Garden Prairie	Roman Catholic Diocese of Rockford	2008	42°16′37.1″N 88°42′55.4″W
153314	100.5	W263BM	Steward	Roman Catholic Diocese of Rockford	2008	41°49′50.5″N 89°29′47.3″W

Applications from Spirit Educational Association & Diocese of Rockford
Fac. ID	Freq.	City of license	Licensee	Application date	Tower (NAD83)
145803	92.1	Bloomington	Spirit Education Association	March 17, 2003	40°27′10.0″N 88°57′56.0″W
145922	94.5	Sandwich	Spirit Education Association	March 17, 2003	41°37′36.4″N 88°36′1.8″W
153179	94.5	Freeport	Roman Catholic Diocese of Rockford	March 17, 2003	42°17′44.0″N 89°37′24.9″W
153348	103.9	Rockford	Roman Catholic Diocese of Rockford	March 17, 2003	42°12′3.0″N 89°03′24.4″W
