= Richwoods Township, Peoria County, Illinois =

Coordinates: 40°45′01″N 89°34′00″W

Richwoods Township
- Township
- Location in Peoria County

- Peoria County's location in Illinois
- Country: United States
- State: Illinois
- County: Peoria
- Established: November 6, 1849

Area
  - Total: 3.11 sq mi (8.1 km^{2})
  - Land: 2.99 sq mi (7.7 km^{2})
  - Water: 0.13 sq mi (0.34 km^{2}) 4.18%

Population (2010)
  - Estimate (2016): 5,938
  - Density: 2,039.8/sq mi (787.6/km^{2})
- Time zone: UTC-6 (CST)
  - Summer (DST): UTC-5 (CDT)
- FIPS code: 17-143-63771
- Website: richwoodstownship.org

Richwoods Township is located in Peoria County, Illinois. The geographic designation is Township 9 North, Range 8 East of the Fourth Principal Meridian. As of the 2010 census, its population was 6,089 and it contained 3,048 housing units. The majority of its area is the village of Peoria Heights, Illinois.

== History ==
Part of Richwoods Township was given to City of Peoria Township when it was organized as a township in 1907. Until 1991, the City of Peoria Township grew as the city of Peoria did, and today, most of what was originally Richwoods Township lies within the 1991 city limits of Peoria, and therefore in the Township of the City of Peoria; however, small parts of Richwoods Township's northernwestern sections remained when the boundaries of the Township of the City of Peoria were fixed in place by law in the 1990s, and these, along with the entire village of Peoria Heights, remain as Richwoods Township.

== Geography ==
According to the 2010 census, the township has a total area of 3.11 square miles (8.1 km^{2}), of which 2.99 square miles (7.7 km^{2}) (or 96.14%) is land and 0.13 square miles (0.34 km^{2}) (or 4.18%) is water.

=== Cities, towns, and villages ===
- Peoria (small portion)
- Peoria Heights

== Demographics ==
Historical population
Census	Pop.	Note	%±
2016 (est.)	5,938
U.S. Decennial Census

== See also ==
- Peoria Heights, Illinois
- Peoria Heights High School
- Richwoods High School
