= Vassil Evtimov =

French-Bulgarian basketball player

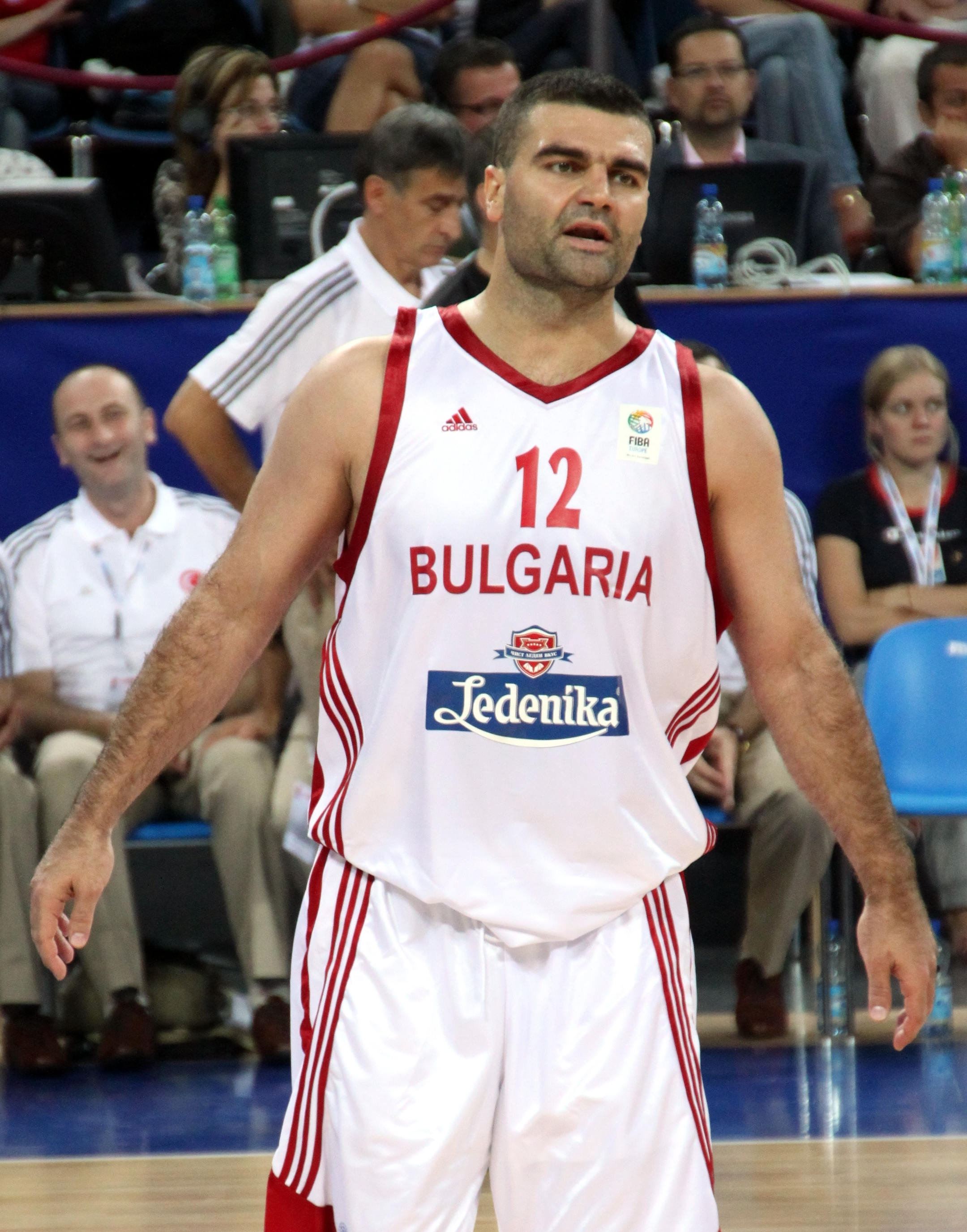
- Vassil Evtimov during EuroBasket 2009

Personal information
- Born: 30 May 1977 (age 49) Sofia, Bulgaria
- Listed height: 2.08 m (6 ft 10 in)
- Listed weight: 120 kg (265 lb)

Career information
- High school: Long Island Lutheran (Brookville, New York)
- College: North Carolina (1996–1999)
- NBA draft: 2000: undrafted
- Playing career: 1997–2015
- Position: Power forward / center

Career history

Playing
- 1997–1998: Élan Béarnais Pau-Orthez
- 1999–2000: Dafni Athens
- 2000–2001: Maroussi
- 2001–2002: Fortitudo Bologna
- 2002: PBC Ural Great Perm
- 2002–2003: ASVEL Basket
- 2003–2005: Caja San Fernando
- 2005: Virtus Roma
- 2005: Union Olimpija
- 2006: Orlandina Basket
- 2006–2007: Fortitudo Bologna
- 2007–2008: CB Valladolid
- 2008: Levski Sofia
- 2008–2009: Pallacanestro Reggiana
- 2009: BC Khimik
- 2009–2010: Panionios
- 2010: AEL Limassol
- 2010–2011: Mitteldeutscher BC
- 2011: Paris-Levallois
- 2011–2012: Levski Sofia
- 2012–2013: Limoges CSP
- 2013–2014: BC Orchies
- 2015: Levski Sofia

Coaching
- 2020–2024: Chernomorets Burgas
- 2024–2026: Cherno More Ticha

Career highlights
- FIBA Saporta Cup champion (2001); Fourth-team Parade All-American (1996); McDonald's All-American (1996)

Vassil Iliev "Vasco" Evtimov (Bulgarian: Васил Илиев "Васко" Евтимов) (born 30 May 1977) is a French-Bulgarian former professional basketball player and head coach of Cherno More Ticha in National Basketball League. A 2.08 m power forward, he played professionally in ten countries throughout his career.

He is the son of Ilia Evtimov and Rosalina Evtimov; his father was also a professional basketball player who relocated the family to France during his career. Vasco's younger brother Ilian is also a professional basketball player.

== Player profile ==
After being selected as a 1996 McDonald's All American, Evtimov played NCAA Division I college basketball with the University of North Carolina. Although he saw limited action off the bench, he participated in two Final Fours with the Tar Heels.

Evtimov was recruited by the legendary coach Dean Smith and was then caught in the transition to coach Bill Guthridge. Despite this, his sophomore year Evtimov led his Tar Heel team in rebounds and points preseason until the NCAA deemed him to have had an unfair advantage by playing overseas for a professional team. He was given an 18-game suspension and returned to the team with 14 games left. Because of these circumstances, he decided to turn professional. He has played for teams in France, Greece, Italy, Spain, Slovenia, Russia, Ukraine and Cyprus over his ten-year professional career.

Vasco Evtimov was a key player for Maroussi BC when they won the Saporta cup in 2001, averaging 13.6 points and 12.6 rebounds during that tournament. Other clubs he has played for are Pau Orthez, Dafni BC, Maroussi BC, Skipper Bologna, PBC Ural Great, ASVEL Basket, CB Sevilla, Lottomatica Roma, KK Union Olimpija, Upea Capo d'Orlando, Climamio Bologna, CB Valladolid, Reggio Emilia, BC Khimik, Panionios BC, AEL Cyprus, Mitteldeutscher BC and Paris-Levallois Basket.

In February 2015, he signed with Levski Sofia. Evtimov announced his retirement in October 2016.

In 2019, 20 years after leaving the University of North Carolina early to turn professional, he fulfilled a promise to himself and finished his Communications degree at UNC, dedicating it to legendary basketball coach Dean Smith.

=== Coaching career ===
On September 16, 2020, Evtimov was hired by the BC Chernomorets as a head coach. In his first season, his team finished fourth in the regular season, eliminated in the quarterfinals in the playoffs and eliminated in the first round of the Cup. In 21-22, he had similar results, fourth in the regular season, eliminated in the quarterfinals in the playoffs and eliminated in the first round of the Cup.

=== National team career ===
Evtimov played for the France national team at the EuroBasket 2001. He is also a member of the Bulgaria national team. Apart from players who acquired new nationalities due to political changes resulting from the fall of communism in Europe, he is the only player to ever compete at EuroBasket for two countries. He was selected to compete for the Bulgarians at EuroBasket 2009, where he was the team's leading rebounder.

== Personal life ==
Evtimov has been married to Mary-Martha Evtimov since September 1999 and has three children, Nicholas (2000) and Maria-Grace (2003) and Liliana-Rose (2010).
