= Senator Daly =

Senator Daly may refer to:

- Bernard Daly (1858–1920), Oregon State Senate
- James Daly (American politician) (1844–1892), New York State Senate
- John B. Daly (New York politician) (1929–1999), New York State Senate
- William D. Daly (1851–1900), New Jersey State Senate

== See also ==
- Senator Daley (disambiguation)
