= Web Junk 20 =

- Starring: Patrice O'Neal (Seasons 1-2); Jim Breuer (Season 3); Aries Spears
- Country of origin: United States
- No. of episodes: 27 (including four "Greatest Hits" shows and two "Web Junk 40"s)

Production
- Running time: 30 minutes

Original release
- Network: VH1
- Release: January 13, 2006 – 2008

Web Junk 20 is an American television program in which VH1 and iFilm collaborate to highlight the twenty funniest and most interesting clips collected from the Internet that week. The show was last hosted by comedian Aries Spears. Patrice O'Neal hosted the first two seasons, while Jim Breuer hosted Season 3. Rachel Perry introduces the premise of each clip via voice-over.

Season 3 of the show introduced credit given to websites the clips are taken from (as announced by Perry). Previous seasons of the show would only introduce the clips, but website addresses from sites such as ebaumsworld.com or break.com could clearly be seen in the clips.

== List of number one clips ==
=== Cycle one ===
- January 13, 2006: "Tyra Banks Gone Wild" (Tyra becomes outraged when a contestant lacks the proper respect for America's Next Top Model)
- January 20, 2006: "My Name Is John Daker" (Local wannabe singer John Daker gives it a go on public-access television cable TV.)
- January 27, 2006: "Steve Ballmer Goes Wild" (The Microsoft executive goes nuts at a corporate convention)
- February 3, 2006: "Kangaroo Court" (A man holds court during an interview on a television program. In the background, a kangaroo is masturbating)
- February 10, 2006: "Most Uncomfortable Interview Ever" (The president of the Japanese fan club for Dakota Fanning gets a little nervous when interviewing his favorite star.)
- February 17, 2006: "Pinky the Wild Cat" (During an animal-adoption ad, the kitty goes berserk and tries to neuter the guy giving her away.)
- February 24, 2006: "Get Carl Lewis' Money!" (The world-famous track star shows off his acting chops and lays down the law.)
- March 10, 2006: "Kitty Porn" (A cat is caught masturbating on tape. This was voted by viewers as the number one clip on the Web Junk 40 year end special.)
- March 31, 2006: "Disaster Series" (A guy who has extremely terrible luck; The winner of the "Show us Your Junk" contest)

=== Cycle two ===
- June 9, 2006: "Tom Cruise: Rump Shaker" (Tom Cruise, promoting Mission: Impossible III on BET, dances to It's Goin' Down)
- June 16, 2006: "But He's Gay" (A newswoman mistakenly identifies Erik Weihenmayer, who climbed Mount Everest as gay instead of blind.)
- June 23, 2006: "Silent Symphony" (The BBC Symphony Orchestra plays John Cage's piece 4′33″ in silence.)
- July 7, 2006: "Connie Chung - Thanks for the Memories" (On the finale of her show Weekends with Maury and Connie, Connie Chung "performs" "Thanks for the Memory".)
- July 14, 2006: "The Zidane Way to Solve Problems" (A parody of Zinedine Zidane's 2006 FIFA World Cup incident, showing a man solving everyday arguments with people by head-butting them.)
- July 21, 2006: "(Theme of) Jake Newcomb" (A tribute by Adam Osborne and Eric Holmes about their friend Jake Newcomb; The winner of the second "Show us Your Junk" contest)

=== Cycle three ===
- November 17, 2006: "Weatherman vs. Cockroach" (A meteorologist gets mortified on two occasions when he spots a cockroach on the floor of the studio.)
- November 24, 2006: "Applebee's Birthday" (A waiter at the restaurant gives a goofy rendition of "Happy Birthday" to a customer.)
- December 1, 2006: "Bunk Bed Wedgie" (A Boy Scout jumps off a bunk bed and gives himself a self-induced wedgie after tying his underwear to the bed.)
- December 8, 2006: "Bull Humps Farmer" (Attempting to do his job, a bull continues to hump a farmer in the pen.)
- December 15, 2006: "Farting Jingle Bells" (A man pretends to imitate "Jingle Bells" with flatulence.)

== Additional episodes ==
After Breuer left the program, the program went on hiatus save for a special Animals & Other Crap episode hosted by Aries Spears. This episode was not produced entirely like the previous episodes, instead including interviews with some people who found fame through viral videos. After taking a year off, a new Web Junk 20 special premiered on January 11, 2008, "Junk 40: Best of the New Crap"'.

== The Kid from Brooklyn/Web Ranter of the Week ==
In the first two seasons, a regular feature of the show were rants from Mike Caracciolo, better known as "The Kid from Brooklyn", called "The Big Man Minute." This man posts regular videos on his website about any and all subjects. His clips were in the number four spot, now commonly filled by different rants every week. (Mr. Pregnant is the most common one so far, with rants about Thanksgiving and Christmas)

== See also ==
- Dot Comedy
