= Peoria Lake =

Illinois River bulge at Peoria, Illinois, USA

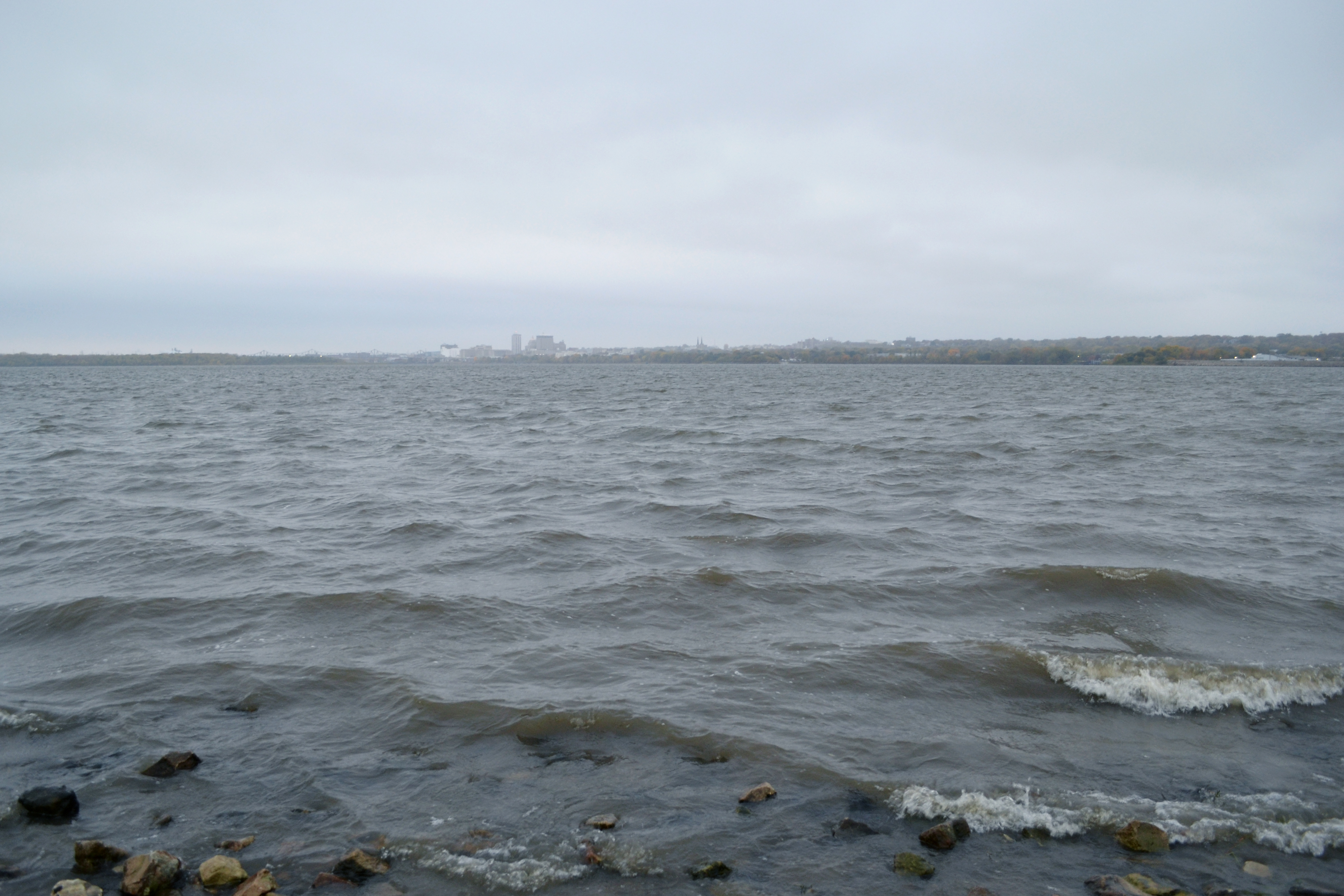
- Peoria Lake, with downtown Peoria in the distance

- Location within Illinois Location within the United States
- Location: Peoria / Tazewell counties, Illinois, U.S.
- Coordinates: 40°42′8″N 89°33′16″W
- Primary inflows: Illinois River (Upper Peoria Lake)
- Primary outflows: Illinois River
- Basin countries: United States

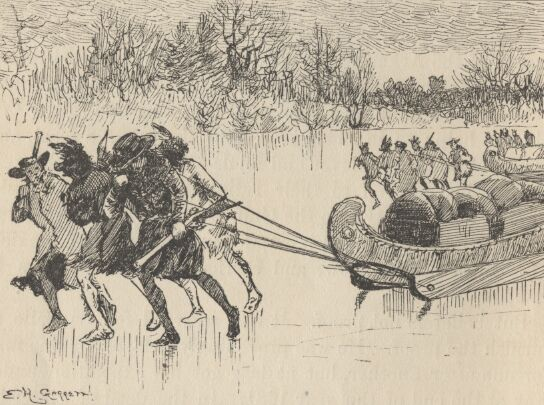
Explorers Joliet and Marquette arriving at Peoria Lake in 1674

Peoria Lake, sometimes called Lower Peoria Lake, is a section of the Illinois River between Peoria in Peoria County, Illinois and East Peoria in Tazewell County, Illinois. The oldest section of Peoria, the largest city on the river, lies at its shores. From a modern perspective, the lake runs from just south of the McClugage Bridge (US 24/US 150/War Memorial Drive) to the Murray Baker Bridge (Interstate 74). The larger Upper Peoria Lake flows into the lake on its north side, at approximately river mile 166.5.

== History ==
Several important Native American settlements were located close to the lake, like the main villages of the Kickapoo and Potawatomi tribes. Other tribes may have used it as a game preserve during the winter while living in the Kaskaskia village, as the area was known for its "fat beasts". The Peoria tribe remained near the lake after the Kaskaskia departed before 1700.

Peoria Lake was mentioned by the Louis Joliet and Jacques Marquette expedition in 1674. During early European colonization, the lake was called 'Pimitéoui, or "It Burns Past" referencing prairie fires, or "Fat Lake". A French Fort on its banks was called Fort Pimitéoui (1691), later known as Old Fort Peoria. The French remained in the Peoria area until about 1819.

== Geology ==
The lake is formed by a broadening of the Illinois River. It is approximately 21 miles (34 km) in length. The Peoria Lake originated during the Woodfordian substage of the Wisconsin glaciation. It is part of the Bloomington moraine.

Due to the flat stream bed, the water moves slowly, allowing sediment to settle at the bottom.

== Fauna ==
Pollution has been a significant factor in decreasing levels of wildlife, notably the reversal of the Chicago River. The Clean Water Act of 1977 has helped the fish population rebound.

== Recreation ==
The lake is currently a regional tourist attraction and is used for practice of many watersports. It is also the usual site for the City of Peoria's Fourth of July fireworks display.

Several public lands border the Peoria Lake, including:

- Riverfront Park
- East Peoria Riverfront Park
- Grand View Park
- Crevecoeur Nature Preserve

Other notable landmarks include:

- Rock Island Depot and Freight House
- Detweiller Marina and Park
- Peoria Waterworks
- Grandview Drive (south entrance)
- Spindler Marina
- Cooper Park South
- EastPort Marina
- Par-A-Dice
- Peoria Lock and Dam (signifies end of the Peoria Pool at river mile 157.7)

== See also ==
- Upper Peoria Lake
