= Peoria Public Schools =

School district in Illinois, United States

Peoria Public Schools District 150, also known as Peoria Public Schools (PPS), is a school district headquartered in Peoria, Illinois.

The district is in Peoria County. It includes most of Peoria, as well as much of West Peoria and sections of Bartonville.

== History ==
Grenita Lathan became the superintendent circa 2010. She was in that capacity until 2015, when she chose to leave her position. At the time the board of trustees was going to deliberate choosing a new superintendent after two members placed the item on the board agenda.

In July 2015 Sharon Desmoulin-Kherat became the interim superintendent. In January 2016, the board voted for her to become the permanent superintendent. All six board members voted to confirm her. Board members stated that the people of the district approved of Desmoulin-Kherat, which is why they chose to confirm her. In January 2019 the board of trustees renewed Desmoulin-Kherat's contract, and that year her salary increased.

During the COVID-19 pandemic in Illinois, at one point the district required all students to wear masks, including students vaccinated against COVID-19.

In 2022, five of the school board members voted to retain Desmoulin-Kherat as superintendent, while two voted against. She began to serve a new four year term. Desmoulin-Kherat's salary also increased.

In 2017 an employee of the school district argued that ethnic minority groups did not have sufficient say in district affairs. This comment resulted in a campaign to rename schools named after figures that caused harm in race relations. Gregory Wilson, a member of the board of trustees, facilitated the renamings. Five schools were renamed in 2022. These renamings, combined with two others that happened after 2018 and before 2022, had a total price of $78,310.59. There were some members of the public who believed the renamings were misguided. Phil Luciano, a columnist for the Peoria Journal Star, argued that the proposed name changes were important and should be done.

As of the 2024-2025 school year the district served more than 12,000 students.

== Schools ==
High schools

- Glen Barton School (Alternative Education)
- Manual High School
- Peoria High School
- Richwoods High School
- Knoxville Center for Student Success
- Woodruff Career & Technical Center

K-8 schools

- Elise Ford Allen Academy
  - Prior to 2022 it was Roosevelt Magnet School. Its namesake was Theodore Roosevelt.
- Glen Oak Community Learning Center
- Annie Jo Gordon Community Learning Center
  - The namesake is Jehan Gordon-Booth's mother. Prior to 2022 it was Harrison Community Learning Center. Its former namesake was Benjamin Harrison.
- Lincoln K-8 School
  - The namesake is Abraham Lincoln.
- Trewyn School

Middle schools

- Mark Bills Middle School
- Harold B. Dawson Jr. Middle School
  - The namesake was the New Life Christian Church's pastor. Prior to 2022 the school was Calvin Coolidge Middle School. Coolidge had supported women voting, and signed the Immigration Act of 1924 which curtailed non-European immigration.
- Liberty Leadership Middle School
  - Prior to 2022, it was Charles A. Lindbergh Middle School. Lindbergh had expressed views that were biased against Jewish people.
- Reservoir Gifted Academy
  - The school's initial name was Reservoir Grade School, referring to a nearby reservoir, but it was renamed Washington Gifted Middle School after George Washington. The school's name changed to Reservoir Gifted Academy in 2022. The board considered renaming it after Betty Friedan, but a board member cited statements from her perceived to be discriminatory against people identifying as LGBT as a reason not to go through with that option.
- Rolling Acres Middle School
- Sterling Middle School
- Von Steuben Middle School

Primary schools

- Charter Oak Primary School
- Franklin Primary School
- Hines Primary School
- Kellar Primary School
- Multicultural Dual Language Academy
- Northmoor Primary School
- Dr. Maude A. Sanders Primary School
  - Its namesake is the first woman of African-American ethnicity to be a doctor in Peoria. The school was named Woodrow Wilson Primary School prior to 2018. The school board voted to rename on a 6-1 basis, with the board member to vote no stating that he did not want Wilson renamed but that he favored another school being named after Sanders. It was renamed because of Wilson promoting racial segregation.
- Dr. C. T. Vivian Primary School
  - The namesake is C.T. Vivian, who organized a 1947 sit-in in Peoria and who assisted Martin Luther King. The school was named Thomas Jefferson Elementary School prior to 2021. All board members voted in favor of the rename. A former board member cited Jefferson's activity with slavery as a reason to rename the school. Members of Vivian's family went to the ceremony to rename the school.
- Whittier Primary School

Preschools

- Valeska Hinton Early Childhood Education Center

Alternative schools

- Jamieson School
- RISE Academy
- Trewyn Day Treatment
