= WIRL =

Currently silent
- Peoria, Illinois; United States
- Broadcast area: Peoria metropolitan area
- Frequency: 1290 kHz C-QUAM AM Stereo
- Branding: Freedom 95.9 & AM 1290

Programming
- Format: Conservative talk
- Affiliations: Fox News Radio; Compass Media Networks; Premiere Networks; Westwood One

Ownership
- Owner: Midwest Communications; (Midwest Communications, Inc.)
- Sister stations: WSWT; WMBD (AM); WPBG; WKZF; WXCL

History
- First air date: August 18, 1948
- Former call signs: WIRL (1948–2000); WWFS (2000–2005)
- Call sign meaning: "With Illinois Radio Listeners"

Technical information
- Licensing authority: FCC
- Facility ID: 13040
- Class: B
- Power: 5,000 watts
- Transmitter coordinates: 40°37′24.1″N 89°35′27.4″W
- Translators: 95.9 W240DM (Peoria, via WPBG-HD3)
- Repeater: 93.3 WPBG-HD3 (Peoria)

Links
- Public license information: Public file; LMS

WIRL (AM 1290) is a commercial radio station that went silent on March 31, 2026. Licensed for Peoria, Illinois, it is owned by Midwest Communications, Inc. Studios and offices were on Fulton Street in Peoria.

WIRL had a license for 5,000 watts. To protect other stations on 1290 AM from interference, it used a directional antenna with a two-tower array by day and four towers at night. The transmitter was on Zion Oaks Road in Marquette Heights, Illinois. Programming was also heard on FM translator W240DM at 95.9 MHz, and on the third HD Radio subchannel of sister station WPBG.

== Programming ==
Before going silent, most of WIRL's programming was nationally syndicated talk shows. Weekends featured shows on money, health, and technology.

== History ==
=== Top 40 and AC ===
WIRL signed on the air on August 18, 1948. It has always broadcast on 1290 AM, powered at 5,000 watts. The owner was the Illinois Valley Broadcasting Company with studios in the Jefferson Building in Peoria.

WIRL was a successful Top 40 radio station from 1960 until the early 1980s. During its tenure, its only competition was daytime-only WPEO 1020 AM. Popular WIRL disc jockeys were Robyn Weaver, Lee Ranson, Jerry Barr, Jim French, Timmy "Old Weird" West, Bill McCluggage, Lee Malcolm, Wayne R. Miller, Howard Taylor, Pete Stewart, VLJ, Charlie O'Day, John Sebastian Bachman, Ann Holub, Dave Phillips, Steve Young, Scott Robbins, Ron Thorn, with Mark Wainwright and many more. For many years, WIRL broadcast Bradley Braves basketball games not aired on WMBD.

In the late 1970s, WKZW, known as "KZ93" (now WPBG), began playing Top 40 hits on the FM band, and siphoned away many listeners from WIRL thanks to its clearer sound and FM stereo. In 1984, WIRL began to evolve into a full-service adult contemporary station. Personalities included Lee Malcolm, Gene Konrad, Kurt Schaeffer, Denise Henley, Steve Larson, Marc Truelove, Steve Young and Darryl Parks. The AC format lasted until the early 1990s. At that point, the station tried oldies and adult standards.

=== Sports, country, oldies and talk ===
In November 2000, the station flipped to a sports radio format as "Fox Sports 1290". The call sign changed to WWFS, with the "FS" standing for Fox Sports Radio. The station returned to the WIRL call sign when it adopted a classic country format in March 2005.

On March 15, 2013, WIRL returned to an oldies format, branded as "Good Time Oldies". It began simulcasting on FM translator W274BM 102.7 FM.

On February 4, 2019, Alpha Media announced that it would sell its Peoria cluster, including WIRL, to Midwest Communications. The price tag for the Peoria stations was $21.6 million. The sale closed on April 30, 2019.

On February 28, 2022, WIRL switched to a conservative talk radio format, branded as "Freedom 95.9". It is also heard on translator W240DM (95.9 FM) and WPBG-HD3. The oldies format is still available on translator W274BM (102.7 FM) and WPBG-HD2.

On March 24, 2026, the station owner announced that WIRL would sign off for the final time at noon on March 31. WIRL filed for special temporary authority to remain silent on March 31, 2026, claiming to the FCC that "WIRL is silent due to adverse market conditions while the licensee explores revenue options for viable and sustainable programming and advertising sales options for the station."

Programming continued on 95.9 by using 93.3 WPBG HD channel 3 as the primary source, as the FCC allows stations to establish analog simulcasts of digital-only FM stations.
