= WXCL =

Pekin, Illinois; United States
- Broadcast area: Peoria metropolitan area
- Frequency: 104.9 MHz
- Branding: 104.9 The Wolf

Programming
- Format: Country
- Affiliations: Westwood One

Ownership
- Owner: Midwest Communications; (Midwest Communications, Inc.)
- Sister stations: WIRL, WKZF, WMBD, WPBG, WSWT

History
- First air date: 1970
- Former call signs: WZRO (1973–80); WKQA (1980–89)
- Call sign meaning: No specific meaning; owners of original WXCL "wanted something catchy and easy to remember"

Technical information
- Licensing authority: FCC
- Facility ID: 33879
- Class: A
- ERP: 6,000 watts
- HAAT: 100 meters (330 ft)
- Transmitter coordinates: 40°43′22.1″N 89°30′40.3″W (NAD83)

Links
- Public license information: Public file; LMS
- Webcast: Listen live
- Website: Official website

WXCL (104.9 FM) is a commercial radio station licensed to Pekin, Illinois and serving the Peoria metropolitan area. It broadcasts a country radio format and is owned by Midwest Communications, Inc. WXCL is one of two outlets in Peoria playing Country music, along with 97.3 WFYR.

== History ==
104.9 signed on the air in 1973 as WZRO with an oldies format. This format was not successful and the station later adopted an automated country music format from Drake-Chenault called "Great American Country."

During the summer of 1980, for several days WZRO went off the air for repairs and a format switch. When it returned it became WKQA with a format of top 40. At this time it was owned by a company called Manship Corp. out of Baton Rouge, Louisiana, co-owned with sister station WFMF. Then, during March 1982 it changed its moniker to Q-104 WKQA, and competed directly against AM station WIRL with an adult contemporary format. It used the monikers "Q-104" and WKQA interchangeably until early 1987.

Then it became known as "Q-105" programming a hot adult contemporary format. Meanwhile, WXCL was formerly on AM 1350. In October 1989 WKQA changed its format and this station on 104.9 FM became known as WXCL-FM. WXCL simulcast on AM and FM for several years in the 1990s as WXCL (AM) and WXCL-FM. WXCL was later replaced on AM by WOAM, leaving WXCL only on FM. WXCL was sold by Kelly Communications the AAA Entertainment in 2002, and sold again by AAA Entertainment to Triad Broadcasting in 2006. Since being bought by Triad, WXCL has used the on-air nickname 104.9 The Wolf.

Effective May 1, 2013, L&L Broadcasting purchased WXCL and 29 other stations from Triad Broadcasting (JMP Media) at a purchase price of $21 million.

On February 4, 2019, Alpha Media announced that it would sell its Peoria cluster to Midwest Communications for $21.6 million. The sale closed on April 30, 2019.

== Personalities ==
Notable former air talent on WXCL: Dan Dermody, Bob Grayson, Dale Van Horn, Kimber Bennett, Sue Parker, Joe Calgaro, Dave Murphy, Joe Bob Cameron, Buck Stevens, Jack Shell, BJ Stone, Jerry Barr, Nancy Shelton, Doc Watson, Jamie Markley, Brad Bensman, Jeanie Plackett, Steve Young, Paul Jackson, Tweed Scott, Bob Look, Marty Roberts, Rick McKay, Michael Cruise, Mario Impemba, Joe Jackson, Robb Rose, Carolyn Mungo, Jim Crowley, Don Elliot, Marc Truelove, Denise Henley, PJ McKay, Maria Gilmore, Jay Curtis, Mort Cantor, Lee Malcolm, Chuck Collins (currently with WMBD-TV), Mike Pesto, "Danger" Dan Belk, Bob "The Bullet" Davis, Brett Erickson, Cody West, Loren Wassell, Chuck Urban, Lee Ranson, Cindy Austin, Andy Corbin, and Bill Bro.

WXCL News personnel included Bill Marlowe (News Director), Ernie Slottag, Alan Friedman. Leon Thomas, Crystal Bostian, Steve Fiorina, Ron Howard, and Clark Smith (former WHOI-TV).
