= Peoria Heights High School =

Location
- 508 East Glen Avenue; Peoria Heights, Peoria County, Illinois 61616; USA; 40°44′44″N 89°35′9″W

Information
- Type: Comprehensive Public High School
- School district: Peoria Heights Community Unit School District 325
- Principal: Aaron Oakford
- Faculty: 18.60 (FTE)
- Grades: 9–12
- Enrollment: 206 (2017-18)
- Student to teacher ratio: 11.08
- Campus type: Urban
- Colors: Red, White, Blue
- Athletics conference: Prairieland; Inter County Athletic
- Team name: Patriots
- Feeder schools: Peoria Heights Grade School
- Website: Official website

Peoria Heights High School, or PHHS, is a public four-year high school located at 508 East Glen Avenue in Peoria Heights, Illinois, a village in Peoria County, in the Midwestern United States. PHHS is part of Peoria Heights Community Unit School District 325, which serves the community of Peoria Heights and a small section of Peoria, and also includes Peoria Heights Grade School. The campus is adjacent to the city of Peoria, and serves a mixed city and village residential community. The school district lies within the Peoria metropolitan statistical area.

== Academics ==
In 2009 Peoria Heights High School did not make Adequate Yearly Progress, with 42% of students meeting standards, on the Prairie State Achievement Examination, a state test that is part of the No Child Left Behind Act. The school's average high school graduation rate between 1999-2009 was 72%.

== Athletics and activities ==
Peoria Heights High School competes in the Prairieland Conference and Inter County Athletic Conference as a member school of the Illinois High School Association. The PHHS mascot is the Patriots with colors of red, white, and blue. The school's boys baseball team won the 2017 1A state championship.

The school competes in the following sports:

- Boys Baseball
- Boys and Girls Basketball
- Boys and Girls Cross Country
- Boys Football
- Boys and Girls Track & Field
- Girls Volleyball
- Boys Wrestling

Other school activities include:

- Academic Challenge
- Scholastic Bowl

== History ==
Peoria Heights High School was opened in 1971. Before that, high school students in the Peoria Heights area attended Richwoods High School in Peoria, until the late 1960s, when they attended Woodruff High School in Peoria.
