= WKZF =

Radio station in Morton–Peoria, Illinois

Coordinates: 40.723°N 89.511°W

Morton, Illinois; United States
- Broadcast area: Peoria metropolitan area
- Frequency: 102.3 MHz
- Branding: KZ102.3

Programming
- Format: Rhythmic AC
- Affiliations: Premiere Networks

Ownership
- Owner: Midwest Communications; (Midwest Communications, Inc.)
- Sister stations: WIRL, WMBD (AM), WPBG, WSWT, WXCL

History
- First air date: 1976 (as WTAZ)
- Former call signs: WTAZ (1976–1999); WFXF (1999–2000); WDQX (2000–2014); WNGY (2014–2019)
- Call sign meaning: Station brands with "KZ"

Technical information
- Licensing authority: FCC
- Facility ID: 43877
- Class: A
- ERP: 4,100 watts
- HAAT: 121.9 meters (400 ft)

Links
- Public license information: Public file; LMS
- Webcast: Listen live
- Website: www.kz1023.com

WKZF (102.3 FM is a commercial radio station licensed to Morton, Illinois, and serving the Peoria metropolitan area. It broadcasts a rhythmic AC radio format and is owned by Midwest Communications, Inc. The radio studios and offices on the 12th floor of The Civic Center Plaza Building in Downtown Peoria.

== History ==
The station came on the air in 1976 as WTAZ, broadcasting an oldies format with NBC features from a studio and transmitter 2.75 miles (4.43 km) northeast of Morton on Washington Road in Tazewell County (hence WTAZ). Roy Demanes (the owner of the Ramada Inn, a bank, and a pharmacy in Peoria, as well as an extensive pre-need burial program) worked with Penny Press Publisher (and former WEEK-TV anchorman) Bud Carter to put the station on the air.

As of the late 1970s, the two were partners in the newspaper previously mentioned (a Peoria-based issues and entertainment oriented publication) and the radio station. Demanes exchanged his ownership in the paper for Carter's interest in the paper, then died of a heart attack a short time later.

The paper was purchased by another suburban weekly (the Observer), and Carter relocated to Atlanta where he now is Senior Chairman for the Atlanta operation of an international organization for CEOs (Vistage International).

Through most of the 1980s and 1990s, WTAZ had a talk format featuring personalities such as G. Gordon Liddy, Rush Limbaugh, Dr. Laura, and Art Bell. On June 14, 1999, those shows and call letters were moved to 1350 AM, and 102.3 became WFXF-FM, broadcasting Howard Stern in the morning, and classic rock. In October 2000, Stern was dropped, and WFXF-FM began playing classic hits. The following year, the station was sold to AAA Entertainment, which signed on WZIM (then WDQZ) in the Bloomington-Normal market at 99.5 MHz. As part of the sale, 102.3 changed its format and began simulcasting a classic rock format with the Bloomington-Normal signal known as "The Eagle" and changed call letters to WDQX. AAA hired the high-profile WJBC morning show of Scott Robbins and Nancy Thiel to do mornings on the new station.

In late 2005, WDQX was sold, along with WXCL, to JMP, a subsidiary of Triad Broadcasting. WDQX kept a classic rock format, but was rebranded as "Max FM", and the music was tweaked to include more hard rock. Effective May 1, 2013, Triad sold WPBG and 29 other stations to L&L Broadcasting for $21 million. L&L would merge with Alpha Media in April 2014.

On October 15, 2014, WDQX owners Alpha Media announced 102.3 would flip to CHR as "Energy 102.3" at 9 a.m. the following day. The last song on "Max FM" was "Happy Trails" by Van Halen, while the first song on Energy was "Break Free" by Ariana Grande. On October 24, WDQX changed its call letters to WNGY to go with the "Energy" branding. "Energy" never fared well in the Nielsen ratings for the Peoria market, barely ever getting above a 2.0 share in its nearly 2-year existence (the last being a 2.1 share in the Spring 2016 books).

"Energy" would continue until September 16, 2016 at 5 p.m., when, after playing "Treat You Better" by Shawn Mendes, WNGY flipped to classic hip hop, branded as "G102.3". The first song on "G" was "Hypnotize" by The Notorious B.I.G.

On February 4, 2019, Alpha Media announced that it would sell its Peoria cluster to Midwest Communications for $21.6 million. The sale closed on April 30, 2019.

On December 9, 2019, at 10 a.m., WNGY began stunting with a loop of David Bowie's "Changes". At noon, the station flipped to rhythmic classic hits as "KZ102.3" (with the WKZF call letters taking effect the same day), thus bringing back the "KZ" branding that was last used at sister WPBG from 1977 to 1994 when it was WKZW (its early incarnation was Rock-leaning Top 40 before shifting to Mainstream Top 40 in the early 1980s until its flip to Adult Top 40 in April 1994).

== Previous logos ==
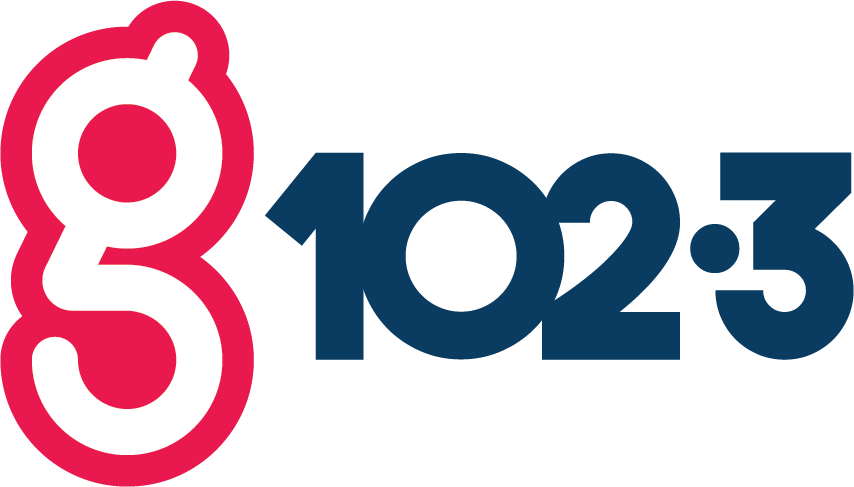
