= John Dailey (politician) =

American politician

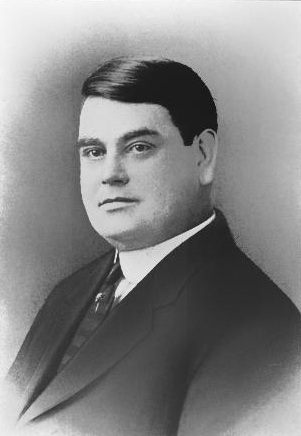

Member of the Illinois Senate from the 18th district
- In office 1908 – 1928
- Preceded by: James D. Putnam
- Succeeded by: Victor P. Michel

Member of the Illinois House of Representatives from the 18th district
- In office 1904 – 1906

State's Attorney of Peoria County
- In office 1896 – 1900

Personal details
- Born: April 17, 1867 Peoria, Illinois
- Died: July 5, 1929 (aged 62)
- Party: Republican
- Profession: Attorney

John Dailey (April 17, 1867 – July 5, 1929) was an American lawyer and politician from Peoria, Illinois. A graduate of the University of Michigan Law School, Dailey served one term in the Illinois House of Representatives and ten terms in the Illinois Senate.

== Biography ==
John Dailey was born on April 17, 1867, in Peoria, Illinois. His father, a shoemaker, was a veteran of the Mexican–American and Civil Wars, wounded in the Battle of Antietam during the latter engagement. Dailey was raised in the Peoria public schools, graduating from Peoria High School in 1885. He attended the University of Michigan, graduating from the Law School in 1890.

Dailey was elected assistant city attorney for Peoria in 1894, serving for two years until elected as Peoria County state's attorney. He founded the law firm of Dailey & Miller in 1904 with Harry S. Miller. Also that year, Dailey was elected as Republican to the Illinois House of Representatives, serving a two-year term. Although he did not serve in the next assembly, Dailey was elected to the Illinois Senate in 1908. He served ten consecutive two-year terms. Late in his life, he moved to Chicago.

Dailey married Clara F. Johnston, a music teacher, in 1895. They had at least one daughter, Lucille. Dailey was active in Freemasonry, reaching at least the thirty-second degree of the Scottish Rite. He was also affiliated with the Benevolent and Protective Order of Elks, Modern Woodmen of America, and Dramatic Order of the Knights of Khorassan. Dailey died on July 5, 1929.
