= First United Methodist Church (Peoria, Illinois) =

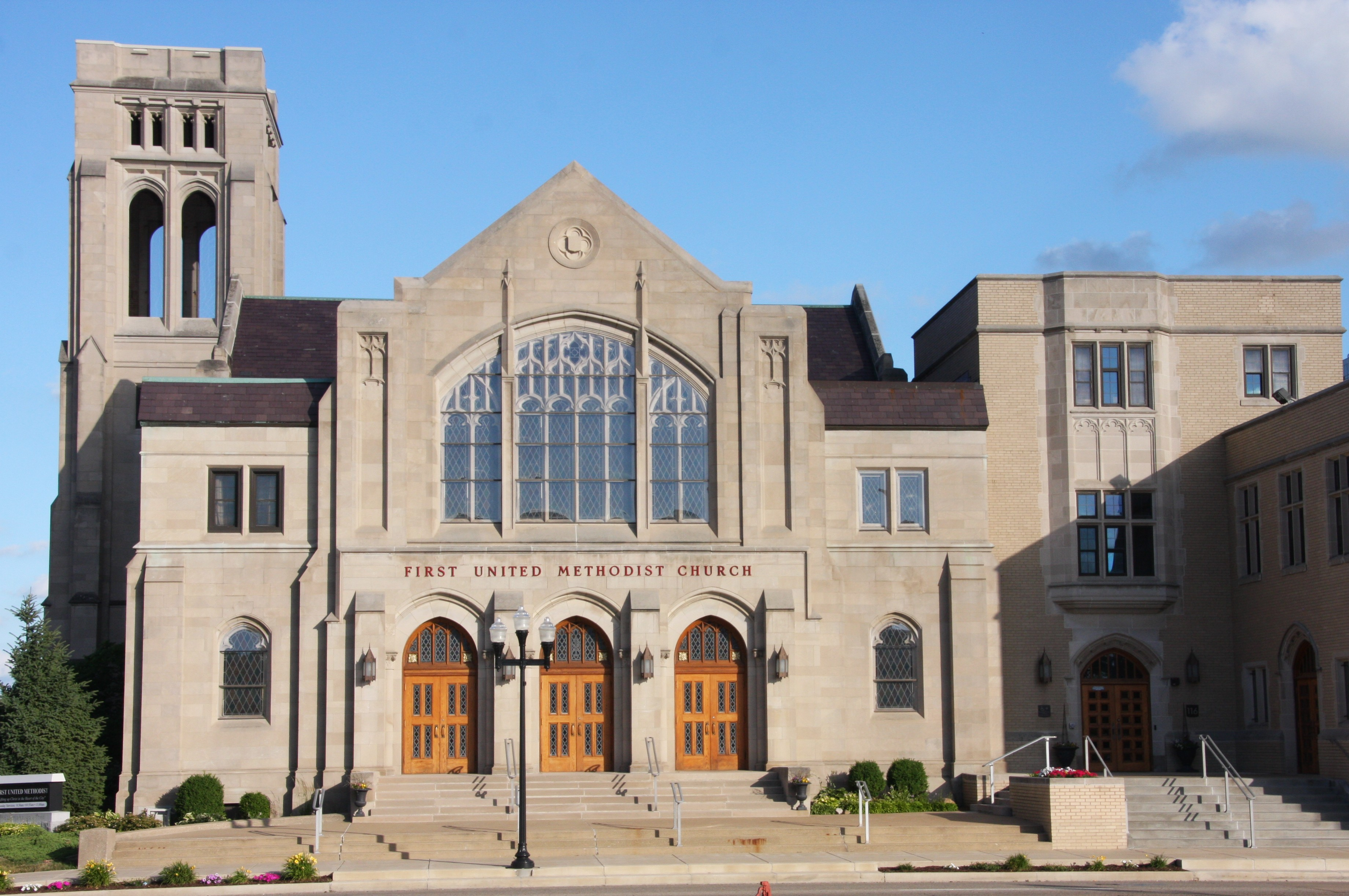
- First United Methodist Church
- 40°41′46.69″N 89°35′32.27″W
- Address: 116 NE Perry Ave, Peoria, IL 61603
- Country: United States
- Denomination: United Methodist Church

History
- Status: 501(c)3 (EIN: 37-1162167)

First United Methodist Church (First UMC) is located in downtown Peoria, in the U.S. state of Illinois. The congregation was established in the early 1800s. It is the oldest Protestant church in Peoria.

== History ==
=== Forerunners ===
The history of the First United Methodist Church begins with the Methodist circuit riders who first came to Illinois in 1825. Rev. Jesse Walker came to Peoria County shortly after it was formed. Sources differ on the exact date, but in the 1820s, Walker started a ministry in Peoria between 1824 and 1828.

The Methodist Episcopal Church (MEC) was organized in November 1833. Without a church building, the congregation met in homes or in the courthouse.

The first building, a frame structure, was constructed in 1840 on Madison and Fulton. With an addition in 1844, the structure was 43 ft by 40 ft. President Martin van Buren visited this building in 1842.

In 1849, the frame structure was sold and moved to Water and Harrison streets as part of the Central Hotel. A brick church, 90 ft by 60 ft, was built on the same lot beginning in 1847. The brick building was dedicated on September 8, 1849.

In 1884, a church was built at Franklin and Sixth.

The "Hamilton" Methodist Episcopal Church, also known as the Madison Ave MEC, was started by the congregation that would become First UMC in 1858. This building was located near the site of the present-day Civic Center.

On May 24, 1900, the Hamilton MEC helped open the Deaconess Home and Hospital, which later became UnityPoint Methodist and now Carle. It had its own school of nursing. The first permanent Methodist Hospital opened in 1917.

=== First United Methodist ===
In 1914, the Hamilton MEC was invited to merge with the Peoria First United Methodist as they planned construction of a new church. On June 18, 1916, the building was dedicated. Additional acreage was purchased in 1917 for future expansion, bringing the total to over $153,000.

In 1957, the congregation voted to remain downtown rather than relocate to the outskirts of the city. The William E. Shaw Memorial building was constructed to add Sunday School classrooms and a nursery. It included Wesley Hall, with a stage and a kitchen.

In 1994, the church purchased the property at 700 Main across the street. It was a space for Sunday School classrooms, a nursery, bilingual worship services, and contemporary worship services. A new addition was completed in 2017 and those services moved to the addition.

The 4,600 sq ft (430 m^{2}) interior was remodeled by Joseph Construction Company in 2004. The sanctuary houses a Wicks Organ.

During the COVID-19 pandemic in 2020, services were held via Zoom meetings and a podcast.

== Services ==
The church offers services in both English and Spanish, contemporary and traditional. The attendance is 535.

The Loaves and Fishes ministry has offered a hot meal, food pantry, clothing, and medical clinic. It began as a temporary effort after a local soup kitchen burned, but has been operational since 1994.

Every other Wednesday, homeless people can receive help with paperwork for birth certificates and state ID, with the church subsidizing the filing fees. This allows people to sign children up for school and apply for housing or jobs.

The Foster Art Gallery exhibits art.

== Notable people ==
- Jon Daker
