= Peoria Waterworks =

- Peoria Water Works
- U.S. National Register of Historic Places
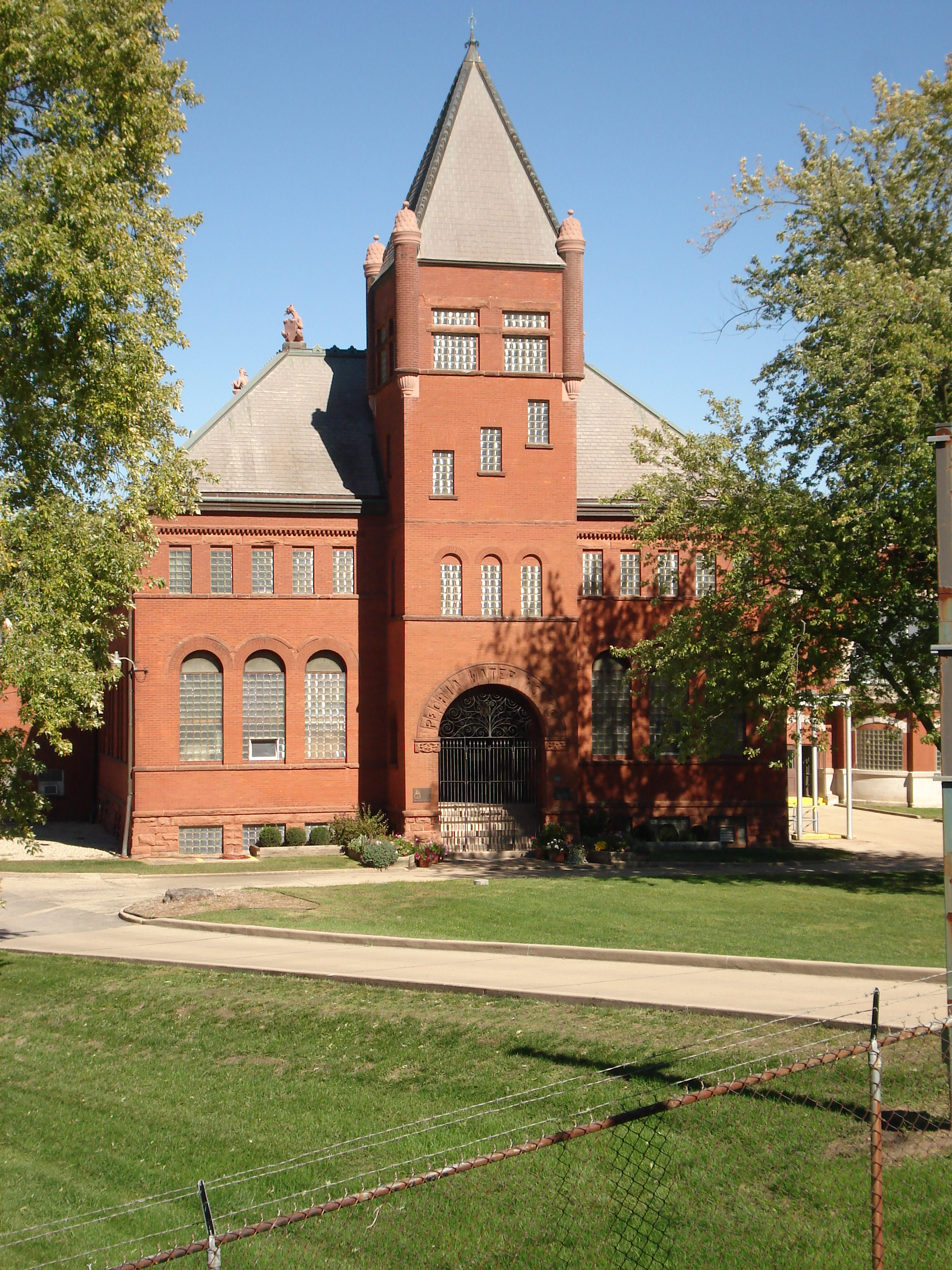

- Location within Peoria County, Illinois
- Location: Lorentz Ave., Peoria, Illinois
- Coordinates: 40°43′29″N 89°33′9″W
- Area: 1.5 acres (0.61 ha)
- Built: 1890
- Architect: H.H. Richardson
- Architectural style: Romanesque Revival
- NRHP reference No.: 80001403
- Added to NRHP: March 18, 1980

Peoria Waterworks is a building complex built in 1890 for the Peoria, Illinois water system.

== Architecture ==
The three building site was constructed in 1890 after the publicly owned Peoria Water Company was sold to John T. Moffat and Henry C. Hodgskins. The building was designed in Romanesque Revival style and first supplied water to the city of Peoria on December 1, 1890. The three structures, Pumping Station #1, Pumping Station #2 and the Main Well House, were included on the property's listing on the U.S. National Register of Historic Places on March 18, 1980. The original property was located at NE Adams and Lorentz St.; now the address is 100 Lorentz Ave. It is near the foot of Grandview Drive.

The red sandstone buildings feature carvings, stained glass windows, copper flashing, hardwood trim, and turrets. Four gargoyles adorn the corners of the zinc roof of the Main Pumping Station.
