= WMBD (AM) =

- Peoria, Illinois; United States
- Broadcast area: Peoria metropolitan area
- Frequency: 1470 kHz
- Branding: 1470 WMBD 100.3

Programming
- Format: News/Talk
- Network: Fox News Radio
- Affiliations: Compass Media Networks; Premiere Networks; Radio America

Ownership
- Owner: Midwest Communications; (Midwest Communications, Inc.)
- Sister stations: WIRL, WKZF, WPBG, WSWT, WXCL

History
- First air date: 1927; 99 years ago
- Call sign meaning: Call sign randomly assigned from sequential list (Note: Original owner Enos Kahler assigned the backronym "World's Most Beautiful Drive" in reference to a legend that former President Theodore Roosevelt lauded Grandview Drive during a visit to Peoria in 1910.)

Technical information
- Licensing authority: FCC
- Facility ID: 42119
- Class: B
- Power: 5,000 watts
- Transmitter coordinates: 40°34′22″N 89°32′00″W
- Translator: 100.3 W262BY (Peoria)
- Repeater: 93.3 WPBG-HD4 (Peoria)

Links
- Public license information: Public file; LMS
- Webcast: Listen live
- Website: wmbdradio.com

WMBD (1470 kHz) is a commercial radio station, the oldest in Peoria, Illinois. It broadcasts a news/talk format and is owned by Midwest Communications with the license held by Midwest Communications, Inc. The studios and offices are on Fulton Street in Peoria. The WMBD transmitter site is located on County Road 2100 East in Groveland Township, Illinois. The station is powered at 5,000 watts, with a directional signal. By day, a two-tower array is used, switching to a four towers at night to avoid causing interference with other stations.

Programming is also heard on 250-watt FM translator W262BY at 100.3 MHz. WMBD is not licensed to broadcast in HD; however, it is carried on an FM sister station's HD subchannel, 93.3 WPBG-HD4.

== Programming ==
WMBD has local shows in morning and afternoon drive time. Weekdays begin with Greg & Dan (Greg Batton and Dan Diorio) with The Phil Luciano Show in afternoons. The rest of the weekday schedule is made up of nationally syndicated talk shows: Armstrong & Getty, The Ramsey Show with Dave Ramsey, Markley, Van Camp & Robbins (based at WMBD), The Dana Loesch Show, Coast to Coast AM with George Noory and This Morning, America's First News with Gordon Deal.

Weekends include shows on home improvement, rural life, religion, technology and the law. Weekend syndicated programs include The Kim Komando Show, Bill Handel on the Law, Sunday Nights with Bill Cunningham, The Weekend with Michael Brown, The Jesus Christ Show with Neil Saavedra and Somewhere in Time with Art Bell. Most hours begin with an update from Fox News Radio. The station also carries Bradley Braves basketball games from Bradley University in Peoria.

== History ==
=== Early years ===
WMBD began operations during a chaotic period when most government regulation had been suspended, with new stations free to be set up with few restrictions, including choosing their own transmitting frequencies. The station was first licensed on January 3, 1927, to Enos Kahler's Peoria Heights Radio Laboratory at 107 East Glen Avenue, operating on a self-assigned "split" frequency of 1075 kHz. The call letters were randomly assigned from a sequential list of available call signs; when Kahler was notified of the call letters, his family worked to find a slogan to match the call sign; one person recalled then-President Theodore Roosevelt once describing Grandview Drive, the location of the station's original studios, as "the world's most beautiful drive".

Following the establishment of the Federal Radio Commission (FRC), stations were initially issued a series of temporary authorizations starting on May 3, 1927, which reassigned WMBD to 1080 kHz. In addition, stations were informed that if they wanted to continue operating, they needed to file a formal license application by January 15, 1928, as the first step in determining whether they met the new "public interest, convenience, or necessity" standard. On May 25, 1928, the FRC issued General Order 32, which notified 164 stations, including WMBD, that "From an examination of your application for future license it does not find that public interest, convenience, or necessity would be served by granting it." However, the station successfully convinced the commission that it should remain licensed.

On November 11, 1928, the FRC implemented a major reallocation of station transmitting frequencies, as part of a reorganization resulting from its implementation of General Order 40. WMBD was assigned to 1440 kHz, sharing time with WTAD. In 1935, WTAD moved to 900 kHz, which allowed WMBD to begin unlimited operation. On March 29, 1941, WMBD, along with most of the stations on 1440 kHz, moved 1470 kHz, its location ever since, as part of the implementation of the North American Regional Broadcasting Agreement.

WMBD was a long-time CBS Radio network affiliate until 2001. Through the 1930s, 1940s and 1950s, WMBD aired the CBS line up of dramas, comedies, news, sports, soap operas, game shows and big band broadcasts during the "Golden Age of Radio."

=== Full service radio ===
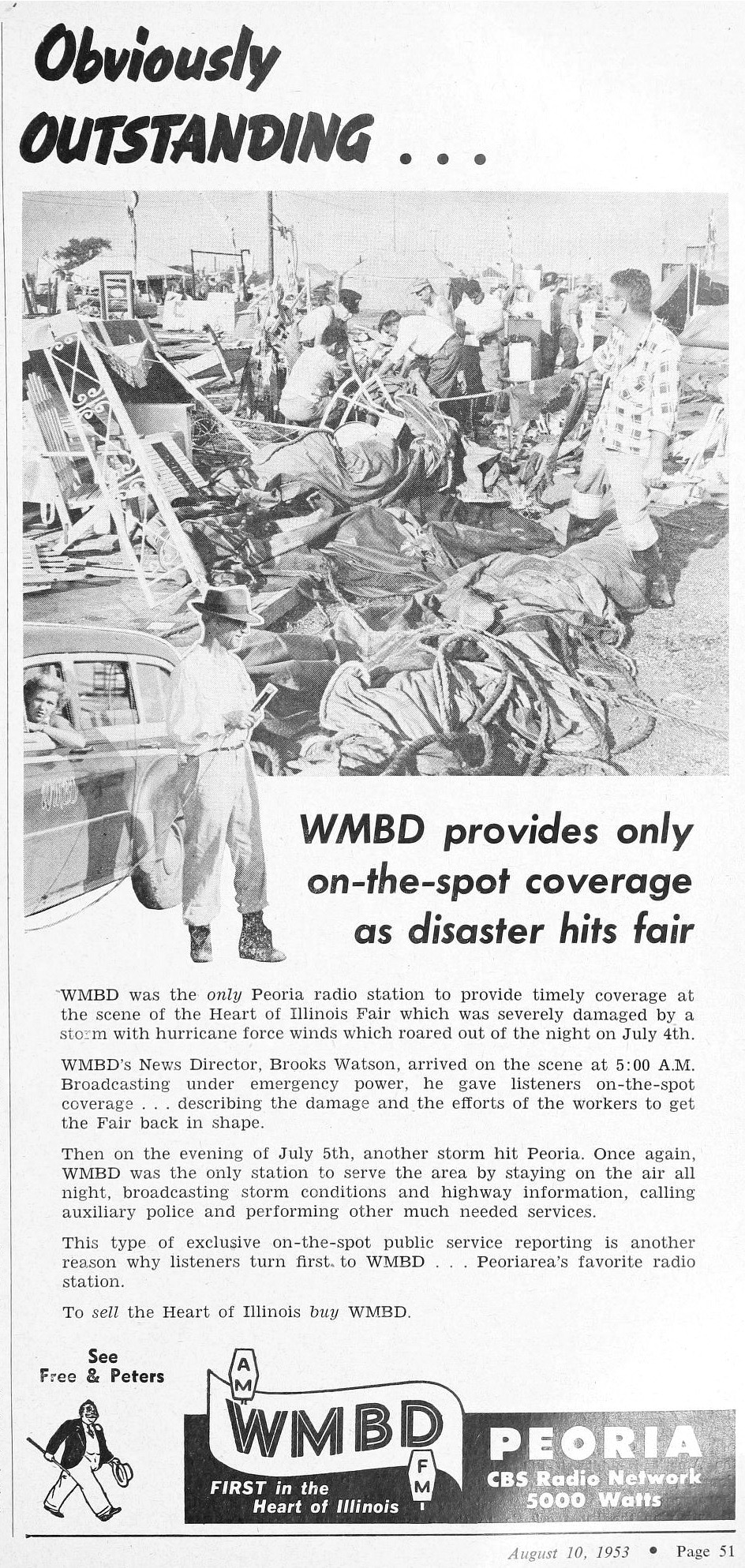
1953 station advertisement.

WMBD has for many decades broadcast a full service format, offering news, talk, weather, agricultural reports, sports and music. Past announcers included Bob Carlton, Farmer Bill, Milton Budd, and John Williams, who is now at WGN. The station always had strong agribusiness coverage to serve rural portions of its coverage area, and for many years had a noon farm show, which has now moved to sister station WIRL. Colleen Callahan was the long-time agriculture news director.

WMBD is the flagship station for Compass Media Networks' Markley, Van Camp and Robbins, which rolled out in syndication in 2019. Prior to the death of Rush Limbaugh, the trio had recorded their show while Limbaugh was broadcast live on WMBD. Markley, Van Camp and Robbins originally aired on WMBD on a three-hour delay.

WMBD has broadcast Bradley Braves basketball games for over 60 years. Current Bradley announcer is Dave Snell who has been doing Bradley play-by-play since 1979. WMBD carried St. Louis Cardinals baseball games for many years until 2014, when those games moved to sister station WIRL.

=== Ownership ===
WMBD is no longer co-owned with WMBD-TV channel 31; Midwest Television, which owned WMBD, WPBG, and WMBD-TV for decades, divested itself of all its stations outside of San Diego in the 1990s, selling WMBD-TV to Nexstar Broadcasting and the radio stations to JMP Radio Group, a local division of Triad Broadcasting. Triad has since bought WIRL, WSWT, WXCL, and WDQX (now WKZF). Effective May 1, 2013, Triad sold WMBD and 29 other stations to L&L Broadcasting for $21 million. L&L was later merged into parent company Alpha Media in February 2014.

On February 4, 2019, Alpha Media announced that it would sell its Peoria cluster to Midwest Communications for $21.6 million. The sale closed on April 30, 2019.

== See also ==
- Grandview Drive
- WMBD-TV
