= Grandview Drive =

- Grand View Drive
- U.S. National Register of Historic Places
- U.S. Historic district
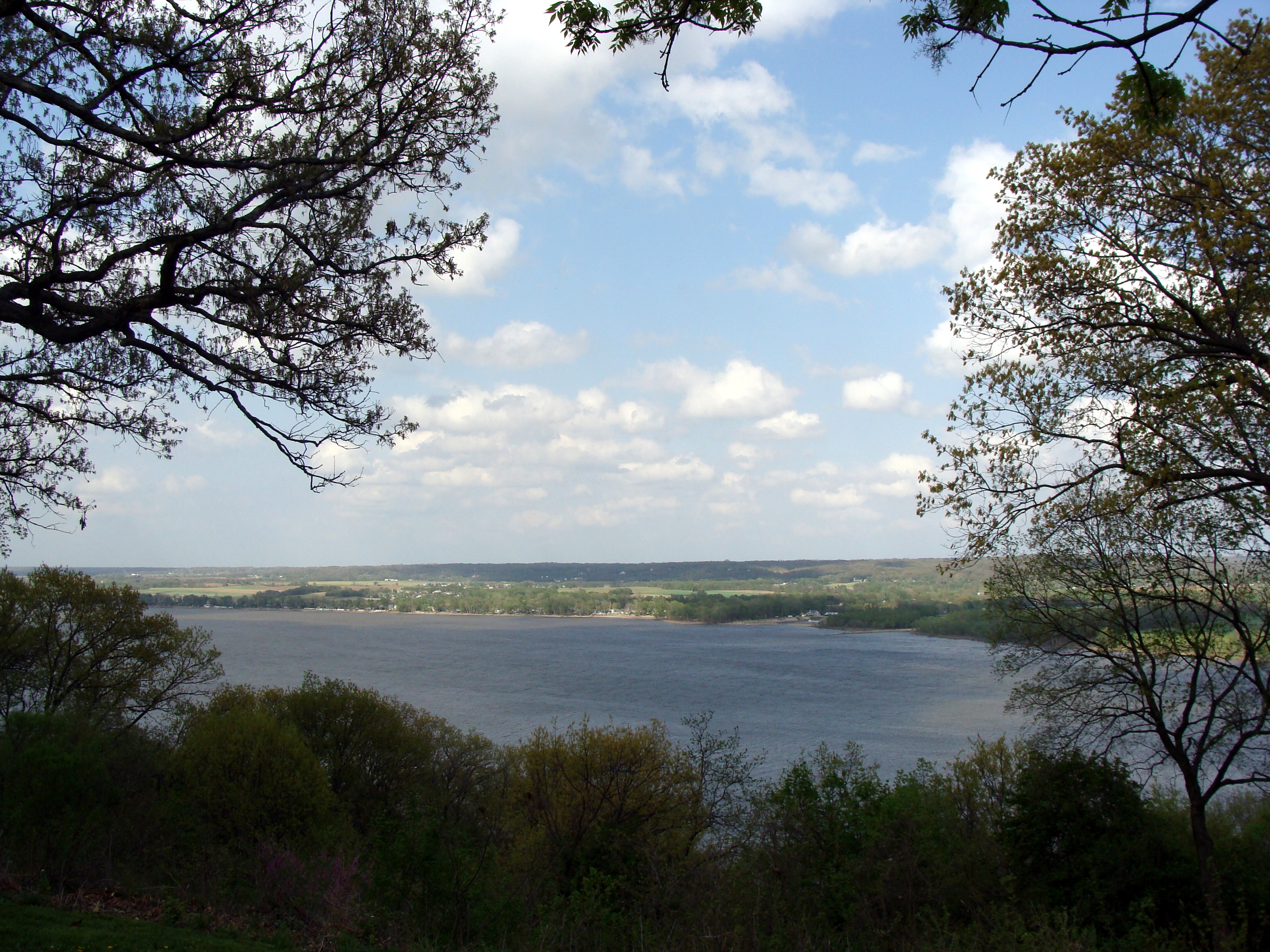
- One view across the Illinois River from Grandview Drive, 2008

- Location within Illinois
- Location: Peoria and Peoria Heights, Peoria County, Illinois, U.S.
- Coordinates: 40°44′10″N 89°33′18″W
- Area: 181.52 acres (73.46 ha)
- Built: 1906-1925
- Architect: Oscar F. Dubius, Frederic Klein
- Architectural style: City Beautiful Movement
- NRHP reference No.: 96000399
- Added to NRHP: September 27, 1996

Grandview Drive (sometimes spelled Grand View Drive) is a two and a half mile scenic road with adjacent park areas through Peoria and Peoria Heights, Illinois. Major portions of the road give a view of the Illinois River and its valley as well as clear views of some of the historic homes in the area. Houses along Grandview Drive are among the best known in the city; the residential area on the west of Grandview Drive, opposite the river, was added to the National Register of Historic Places as an historic district in 1996. A large amount of land on the valley side of Grandview Drive is owned by the Peoria Park District and is undeveloped except for park benches.

== History ==
On March 15, 1894, the Pleasure Driveway and Park District of Peoria was the first in Illinois to organize under the Pleasure Driveways and Park Districts Act.

=== Name ===
The district's legal name, "Pleasure Driveway and Park District of Peoria", is a reflection of Grandview Drive's original prominence in the Peoria park system. The drive is said to have been one of the first "linear parks" of its time.

President Theodore Roosevelt is said to have proclaimed it the "World's Most Beautiful Drive" during a 1910 visit. Though this is more a paraphrase of his sentiments than an exact quote. Grandview Drive was the original location of WMBD (AM); although the WMBD callsign was assigned in FCC sequence, the callsign is associated with Roosevelt's comment.

=== Development and design ===
Oscar F. Dubuis was hired as the landscape gardener and engineer. Dubuis was born in Geneva, Switzerland. He served a four-year apprenticeship under Frederick Law Olmsted, designer of New York's Central Park. Dubuis worked for the West Park Board of Chicago for twenty-three years.

In 1896, the park board began making plans for Grandview Drive and securing property rights. In 1902, Dubuis began developing the plan for the drive. He tried to keep as many original trees as possible, including species of white oak, red oak, hickory, sugar maple, Norway maple, and sycamore.

Construction began on October 14, 1903. No machines were used; hand labor and horses performed all the labor on the overgrown hilly terrain. One year later, the road bed had been cut. The original base was made from gravel and sand, which became dusty and deeply rutted after cars became popular. In the mid-1930s, the road was repaved with asphalt.

Construction of a five-story observation tower began in 1905 and was completed in 1906. After roughly forty years, the tower was razed in 1942 due to corrosion and a high cost of repair. It was used as scrap metal for the World War II effort. Today the northeast corner of the site is home to the Pimiteoui marker, relocated to the site and installed by the Peoria Park District in 1975.

== Location ==
Grandview drive stretches from Prospect Road to Illinois Route 29, and is a winding road with several sight-seeing areas. Along the road is the Peoria Country Club, which includes a golf course and tennis courts. There is also a large park, known as Grandview Park.

== Historic district boundaries ==
The National Register of Historic Places boundary for The Grand View Drive Historic District is "roughly bounded by Prospect Road in the north, the Illinois River bluffs, Adams Street in the south and the Grand View Drive W. right of way". This description appears to be contradictory, as Grandview Drive runs between Prospect Road and Adams Street (Illinois Route 29), and the description appears to give no northern boundary.

The northern end of Grandview Drive is close to Tower Park in Peoria Heights, Illinois; when North Grandview Drive meets North Prospect Road, the name changes into East Kingman Avenue. It is near the birthplace of the first gasoline-powered car in America, the Duryea automobile, built in 1893 by Charles Duryea. The north entry point of the drive is at 792 ft (241 m) above sea level.

The southern end of Grandview Drive is near the Peoria Waterworks building, another designation on the National Register of Historic Places. At the lower entrance, the drive is 450 ft (140 m) above sea level.
