= WPBG =

Radio station in Peoria, Illinois

- Peoria, Illinois; United States
- Broadcast area: Peoria
- Frequency: 93.3 MHz (HD Radio)
- Branding: 93.3 The Drive

Programming
- Format: Classic hits
- Subchannels: HD2: Oldies "102.7 SuperHits"; HD3: Conservative talk "Freedom 95.9"; HD4: News/talk (WMBD simulcast)

Ownership
- Owner: Midwest Communications; (Midwest Communications, Inc.)
- Sister stations: WMBD, WKZF, WIRL, WSWT, WXCL

History
- First air date: April 1947 (as WMBD-FM at 92.5)
- Former call signs: WMBD-FM (1947–1977); WKZW (1977–1994); WMXP (1994–1997)
- Former frequencies: 92.5 MHz (1947–1960s)
- Call sign meaning: "Peoria's Big Oldies" (former branding)

Technical information
- Licensing authority: FCC
- Facility ID: 42114
- Class: B
- ERP: 41,000 watts
- HAAT: 168 meters (551 ft)
- Transmitter coordinates: 40°38′7.00″N 89°32′19.00″W
- Translators: HD2: 102.7 W274BM (Peoria); HD3: 95.9 W240DM (Peoria)

Links
- Public license information: Public file; LMS
- Webcast: Listen Live; Listen Live (HD2); Listen Live (HD3)
- Website: www.933thedrive.com 1027superhits.com (HD2) freedom959.net (HD3)

WPBG (93.3 FM) is a radio station with a classic hits format, and is licensed for Peoria, Illinois. The station was formerly known as 93.3 WMBD-FM, as well as KZ-93 (WKZW) through 1994, "Mix 93.3" prior to its conversion to oldies/classic hits. The station is owned by Midwest Communications, Inc.

== HD Radio ==
WPBG broadcasts in the HD Radio digital (hybrid) format:

- HD1 is a digital simulcast of the (traditional) analog format of classic hits.
- HD2 is an oldies format known as 102.7 Super Hits, simulcast on FM translator W274BM.
- HD3 is a format known as Freedom 95.9, simulcast on FM translator W240DM.
- HD4 is a simulcast of longtime sister station 1470 WMBD, also simulcast on FM translator W262BY.

== History ==
WMBD-FM was established in April 1947 with 17,000 watts on 92.5 MHz as a sister station to 1470 WMBD (AM), the only other station in Peoria; the nearest other FM station was 101.5 WJBC-FM (now WBNQ) in Bloomington, established the same month as a sister station of 1230 WJBC (AM). By 1950, WMBD-FM was licensed for 20,000 watts. WMBD-FM duplicated WMBD (AM) during its early years. It was sold (with AM and TV) to Fetzer Stations on February 1, 1953.

The station signed on as with a beautiful music format and utilized the slogan "Music Only For a Woman". The station was originally on 92.5 MHz but moved to 93.3 MHz in the early 1960s.

For several years, WMBD-FM went by the slogan of "Rock 93". Then, in late 1977, the station adopted a Rock-leaning Top 40/CHR format as WKZW, calling itself "KZ93". The station was successful immediately and rapidly overtook Top 40 AM WIRL in the ratings. In late 1983, WKZW started a transition from being a rock-based CHR format to a mainstream CHR format. The KZ93 KZJs included Tommy Wood, Mark Maloney, Gary Olson, Jeffrey Moore, Cristy Ryan, Keith Edwards, Scott Wheeler, Gene Stern, Derek Johnson, Lee Malcolm, Kenneth "Ken Cook" Hackney, Troy Hamilton, Jeffrey Kingsley, Glen Thomas, Kenny Blum, with Andy Masur, Ray Price, Charlie Quinn, Steve Rodeo and Danny Baker. KZ93 was at or near the top of the ratings in the Peoria radio market throughout its reign as the premiere Top 40/CHR outlet in all of Central Illinois, but by the early 1990s, the ratings began to falter.

On April 7, 1994, WKZW flipped to a hot adult contemporary format as WMXP and the slogan "Mix 93.3". The station ran most of its music off of analog broadcast carts during this era (when many stations were converting to CD and/or computer audio playback). During the "Mix" years, the morning show was hosted by Dave Kallaway and Beck Ryan. Other jocks included Gene Stern, Scott Wheeler, Mary Lynn, Chris McIntyre (now program director and mornings on WKAY in Galesburg, Illinois), Keith Kelly(Robb Rose), and Joe Crain (now meteorologist at WICS-TV in Springfield). Also, for a portion of its time as "Mix 93.3", the morning radio show was simulcast with the television show on sister station WMBD-TV. This simulcast show was known as "The Morning Mix". The simulcast ended in late 1996. On March 10, 1997, the station flipped to an oldies format as "Big Oldies 93.3" and adopted the current call sign. At that time, "The Morning Mix" continued on WMBD-TV for quite some time. The station used the "Big Oldies 93.3" slogan before the current format of classic hits was adopted in August 2006.

The station was recently owned by Triad Broadcasting. Sister stations include WIRL, WMBD (AM), WDQX (now WKZF), WXCL and WSWT. Effective May 1, 2013, Triad sold WPBG and 29 other stations to L&L Broadcasting for $21 million. L&L would merge with Alpha Media in April 2014.

On February 4, 2019, Alpha Media announced that it would sell its Peoria cluster to Midwest Communications for $21.6 million. The sale closed on April 30, 2019.
