= Richwoods High School =

Public high school in Peoria, Illinois

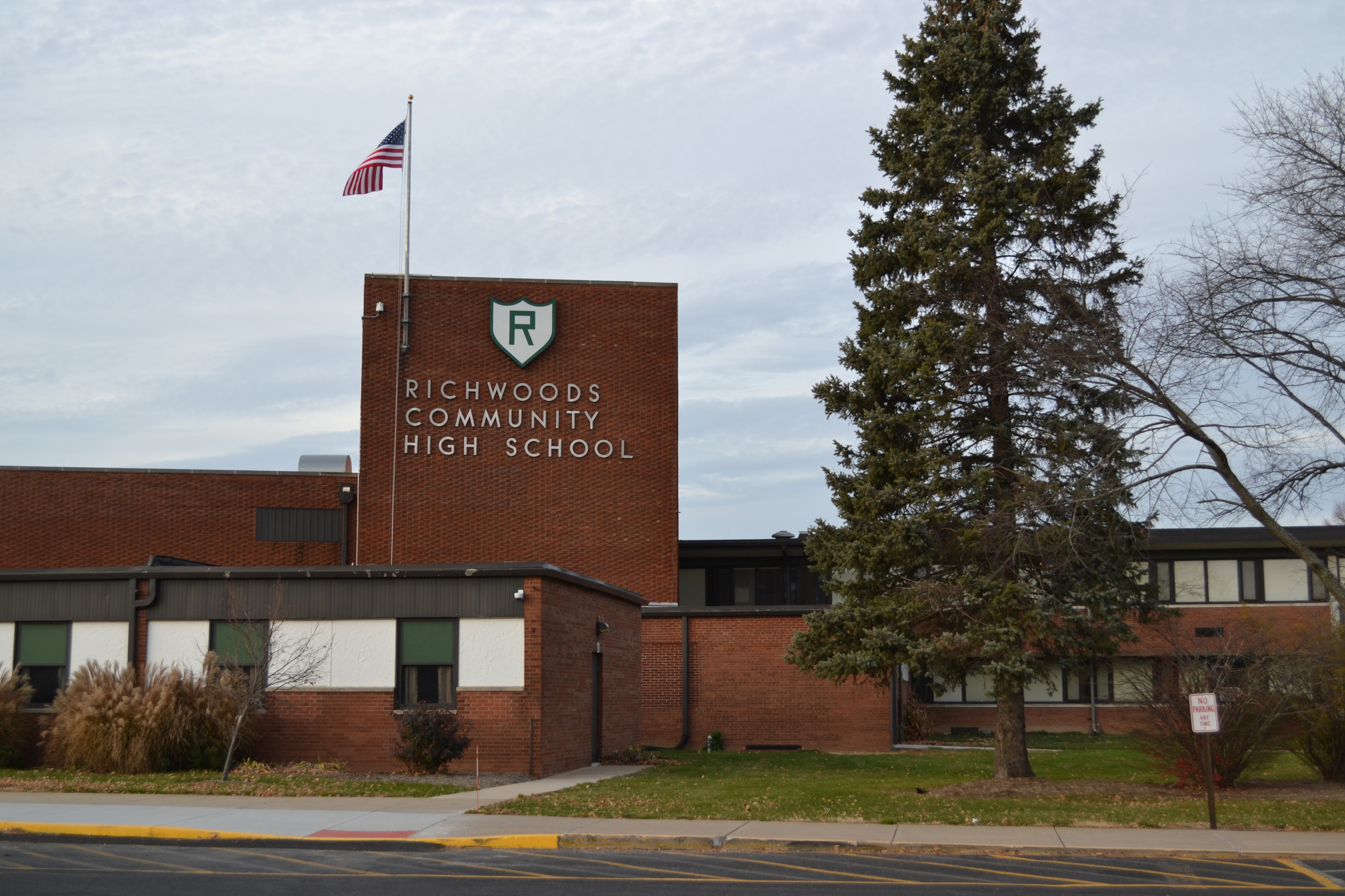

Location
- 6301 N. University St. Peoria, Illinois; United States; 40°45′49″N 89°36′50″W

Information
- Type: High School-Public Secondary
- Established: 1957
- School district: Peoria Public Schools District 150
- Principal: William Robison
- Staff: 75.73 (FTE)
- Grades: 9–12
- Enrollment: 1,576 (2023-2024)
- Student to teacher ratio: 20.81
- Campus: City
- Colors: Forest Green, White, and Gray
- Athletics: IHSA
- Athletics conference: Big Twelve
- Sports: Boys- Baseball, Basketball, Football, Track, Golf, Swimming, Tennis, Wrestling, Cross Country Girls- Softball, Basketball, Track, Golf, Swimming, Tennis, Volleyball, Flag Football, Wrestling, Cross Country
- Mascot: Knight
- Nickname: Knights
- Rival: Peoria Notre Dame and Peoria High
- Newspaper: The Shield
- Yearbook: Excalibur
- Website: www.peoriapublicschools.org/o/rhs

Richwoods High School is a public high school in Peoria, Illinois, United States. Opened as a township high school in 1957, it was brought into Peoria Public Schools District 150 in the 1960s. Feeder middle schools are Mark Bills, Liberty Leadership, Rolling Acres, Von Steuben, and Reservoir Gifted.

== History ==
Richwoods was originally the high school of Richwoods Township. The name of the school when it opened in 1957 was Richwoods Community High School. In the 1960s, the school was annexed to the city of Peoria, causing it to come under the purview of Peoria Public Schools (District 150). A lengthy legal battle ensued, and District 150 was required to allow students from the original school district to attend District 150 schools until Peoria Heights High School could be built to replace it. It wasn't until after 1956 (when the school began construction), that certain parts of the building known to present students and faculty were built. In the years that followed, the pool, the back gym, the chorus room, and the 300 and 400 hallways were built.

=== International Baccalaureate Program ===
In 2005, the first class of International Baccalaureate students graduated from Richwoods High School with the actual program being implemented a few years earlier in 2002. Students in the IB Diploma program must take three Higher Level courses from Biology, History, Mathematics, Business Management, and English. The Richwoods IB Program also offers standard level courses in Chemistry, Anthropology, Biology, Psychology, Mathematics, Physics, Computer Science, French, Spanish and Music Theory.

== Activities ==
Richwoods has public speaking, football, and basketball programs, among others. Richwoods contains facilities for swim and dive, baseball, football, track and field, volleyball, basketball, and an auditorium.

The school publishes one in-school newspaper, "The Shield," and a yearbook, "The Excalibur," that is now only located online on the Richwoods page.

=== Marching / Concert Band ===
Every year the band performs four concerts and at home games of the football and basketball seasons. The Richwoods Marching Knights travel to competition performances of their annual show across Illinois. The marching band includes the color guard which enhances the show's theme, adding visual flair and movement.

=== Orchestra ===
The Orchestra at Richwoods High School puts on three concerts every year, one for Fall, one for Winter, and one for Spring. In between these larger performances, the orchestra also plays at community events, district showcases, and more.

=== Plays and musicals ===
Twice a year, Richwoods High School students perform on-stage. In the fall, students perform a play: in 2005, The Bad Seed; in 2006, Peter Pan; in 2007, Arsenic and Old Lace; in 2008,Our Town; and in 2009 "The Miracle Worker". RHS produces musicals in the spring time: in 2004, Damn Yankees, in 2005, Guys and Dolls, in 2006, Fiddler on the Roof, in 2007, The Boy Friend, in 2008 Rodgers and Hammerstein's Cinderella, in 2009, Little Women, and in 2010, Thoroughly Modern Millie. In the more recent years, Gillian Cramer directed all performances from 2018 to 2025, however, in the fall semester of 2023, a fall play was skipped due to complications with illness, and the musical performed in the spring of 2024 was chosen to be Hairspray. In the spring of 2025, Richwoods High School performed Bring It On. The most recent fall plays, in 2025, was a two-act combination between "Tough City, Prone to Rain" as the first act and "Hollywood's Worst Screen Tests" for the last act.

=== Madrigals ===
Every year since it was first started in 1974, Richwoods has a madrigal dinner, performed in a traditional 15th-century style. A core group of Madrigal Singers, both male and female perform much of the singing a cappella. Part of the core Madrigals group are a king, queen, and jester that lead holiday performance. An all-female musical student group within the 15th-century style dinner is the Ladies in Waiting that sing more holiday carols.

== Sports ==
Richwoods is a member of the Big Twelve Conference of the Illinois High School Association. The school colors are forest green, white, and gray and their mascot is the Knight.

The Lady Knights basketball team won the Class 3A State Championship for the 2008–09 season. They also won the Class AA State Championship in 2005.

Cross country coach Bob LaCroix holds the state dual meet record with 485 wins and 64 losses.

The Knights football team won the state championship in 1984 and 1988.

== Notable alumni ==
- J. Michael Adams — 6th president of Fairleigh Dickinson University 1999–2012; 8th president, International Association of University Presidents; dean, Antoinette Westphal College of Media Arts and Design 1986–1999
- Nancy Brinker — ambassador and founder of Susan G. Komen for the Cure (in memory of her sister who was also an alumna of Richwoods High School); United States ambassador to Hungary starting in 2001; Chief of Protocol of the United States 2007–2009
- Jon Ginoli — singer-songwriter and guitarist in Pansy Division
- Raja Krishnamoorthi — U.S. Congressman for Illinois' 8th Congressional District
- Ryan Martinie — bass player for Mudvayne
- Sherrick McManis — Former professional football player
- Mike Robinson (class of 1996) - three time all-state selection and the Gatorade Player of the Year for the Midwest in 1996
- Aaron Schock (class of 2000) — U.S. Congressman
- Jamar Smith — professional basketball player
- Eddie Sutter — former professional football player
- Rick Telander — sportswriter and author
