= National Register of Historic Places listings in Peoria County, Illinois =

Location of Peoria County in Illinois

This is a list of the National Register of Historic Places listings in Peoria County, Illinois.

This is intended to be a complete list of the properties and districts on the National Register of Historic Places in Peoria County, Illinois, United States. Latitude and longitude coordinates are provided for many National Register properties and districts; these locations may be seen together in a map.

There are 36 properties and districts listed on the National Register in the county.

This National Park Service list is complete through NPS recent listings posted March 21, 2025.

== Current listings ==
	Name on the Register	Image	Date listed	Location	City or town	Description
1	Central National Bank Building	Central National Bank Building	December 18, 1978 (#78003450)	103 SW Adams St. 40°41′27″N 89°35′20″W	Peoria	
2	Christ Church of Lower Kickapoo	Christ Church of Lower Kickapoo	February 10, 1983 (#83000333)	West of Norwood on Christ Church Rd. 40°42′25″N 89°43′00″W	Norwood	
3	Cumberland Presbyterian Church	Cumberland Presbyterian Church	March 18, 1980 (#80001401)	405 N. Monson St. 40°41′33″N 89°35′46″W	Peoria	
4	Downtown Peoria Historic District	Downtown Peoria Historic District	December 10, 2018 (#100002825)	Roughly between N William Kumpf Blvd., Perry Ave., Fulton, Fayette & Water Sts. 40°41′34″N 89°35′26″W	Peoria	
5	Judge Flanagan Residence	Judge Flanagan Residence	September 5, 1975 (#75000670)	942 NE Glen Oak Ave. 40°42′14″N 89°35′07″W	Peoria	
6	Judge Jacob Gale House	Judge Jacob Gale House	March 19, 1982 (#82002591)	403 NE Jefferson St. 40°41′46″N 89°35′08″W	Peoria	
7	Grand Army of the Republic Memorial Hall	Grand Army of the Republic Memorial Hall	July 13, 1976 (#76000723)	416 Hamilton Boulevard; 40°41′40″N 89°35′21″W	Peoria	
8	Grand View Drive	Grand View Drive	September 27, 1996 (#96000399)	Roughly bounded by N. Prospect Rd., the Illinois River bluffs, Adams St., and the Grand View Dr. W. right of way 40°44′30″N 89°33′52″W	Peoria and Peoria Heights	
9	Illinois Waterway Project Office	Illinois Waterway Project Office	March 10, 2004 (#04000168)	257 Grant St. 40°42′16″N 89°33′58″W	Peoria	
10	International Harvester Building	International Harvester Building	November 15, 2005 (#05001254)	1301-1309 SW Washington St. 40°40′53″N 89°36′14″W	Peoria	
11	Jubilee College	Jubilee College	January 4, 1972 (#72000465)	Northwest of Kickapoo on U.S. Route 150 and Interstate 74; 40°49′38″N 89°46′40″W	Kickapoo	
12	Kickapoo Building	Kickapoo Building	December 31, 2013 (#13001005)	726 W. Main St. 40°41′48″N 89°35′40″W	Peoria	
13	Lincoln Branch Peoria Public Library	Lincoln Branch Peoria Public Library	May 28, 2014 (#14000256)	1312 W. Lincoln Ave. 40°40′53″N 89°36′52″W	Peoria	Part of the Illinois Carnegie Libraries MPS
14	Madison Theatre	Madison Theatre	November 21, 1980 (#80001402)	502 Main St. 40°41′39″N 89°35′29″W	Peoria	
15	Marquette Apartments	Marquette Apartments	December 27, 2016 (#16000901)	701 Main St. 40°41′45″N 89°35′39″W	Peoria	
16	North Side Historic District	North Side Historic District	November 21, 1983 (#83003588)	Roughly bounded by Perry, Caroline, Madison, and Fayette Sts. 40°41′57″N 89°35′02″W	Peoria	
17	Peace and Harvest	Peace and Harvest	February 16, 1994 (#87002527)	Northwestern corner of the junction of Main and Jefferson Sts. 40°41′35″N 89°35′21″W	Peoria	
18	Peoria Automobile Club	Peoria Automobile Club	August 4, 1995 (#95000984)	100 Park Boulevard; 40°54′12″N 89°29′24″W	Chillicothe	
19	Peoria City Hall	Peoria City Hall	February 6, 1973 (#73000715)	419 Fulton St. 40°41′32″N 89°35′33″W	Peoria	
20	Peoria Cordage Company	Peoria Cordage Company	March 19, 1982 (#82002592)	1506 SW Washington St. 40°40′47″N 89°36′19″W	Peoria	
21	Peoria Mineral Springs	Peoria Mineral Springs	March 5, 1982 (#82002593)	701 W. 7th Ave. 40°41′45″N 89°36′18″W	Peoria	
22	Peoria State Hospital	Peoria State Hospital	February 17, 1982 (#82002590)	Ricketts Ave. near U.S. Route 24; 40°38′04″N 89°39′32″W	Bartonville	
23	Peoria Warehouse Historic District	Peoria Warehouse Historic District	September 17, 2014 (#14000621)	Roughly along Adams, May, Oak, Persimmon, State, Walnut & Washington Sts. 40°41′08″N 89°35′52″W	Peoria	
24	Peoria Waterworks	Peoria Waterworks	March 18, 1980 (#80001403)	Lorentz Ave. 40°43′28″N 89°33′08″W	Peoria	
25	Pere Marquette Hotel	Pere Marquette Hotel	August 12, 1982 (#82002594)	501 Main St. 40°41′37″N 89°35′31″W	Peoria	
26	Pettingill-Morron House	Pettingill-Morron House	April 2, 1976 (#76000724)	1212 W. Moss Ave. 40°41′39″N 89°36′41″W	Peoria	Charles Ulricson, architect
27	The Pioneers	The Pioneers	May 4, 2001 (#01000117)	Central Park, N,. Magnolia St. 40°46′45″N 89°58′22″W	Elmwood	
28	Pleasant Grove School	Pleasant Grove School	May 19, 1994 (#94000435)	0.6 miles west of Eden Rd. on Pleasant Grove Rd. 40°40′41″N 89°50′43″W	Eden	
29	John C. Proctor Recreation Center	John C. Proctor Recreation Center	September 6, 1979 (#79000860)	300 S. Allen St. 40°41′07″N 89°36′58″W	Peoria	
30	Rock Island Depot and Freight House	Rock Island Depot and Freight House	December 22, 1978 (#78001180)	32 Liberty St. 40°41′17″N 89°35′20″W	Peoria	River Station
31	Springdale Cemetery	Springdale Cemetery	December 10, 2004 (#04001303)	3014 N. Prospect Rd. 40°43′24″N 89°34′30″W	Peoria	
32	U.S. Post Office and Courthouse	U.S. Post Office and Courthouse	October 24, 2012 (#12000878)	100 NE Monroe St. 40°41′42″N 89°35′30″W	Peoria	
33	Washington C. Wear House	Washington C. Wear House	August 19, 1993 (#93000838)	1 mile south and 0.4 miles west of the junction of Illinois Routes 90 and 91; 40°54′55″N 89°45′53″W	Princeville	
34	West Bluff Historic District	West Bluff Historic District	December 17, 1976 (#76000725)	Randolph, High, and Moss Sts., east of Western St. 40°41′49″N 89°36′31″W	Peoria	
35	YWCA Building	YWCA Building	May 17, 2007 (#07000147)	301 NE Jefferson; 40°41′40″N 89°35′16″W	Peoria	
36	Zion Episcopal Church		April 15, 2024 (#100010213)	205 East Van Buren Street; 40°50′16″N 89°52′58″W	Brimfield	

== See also ==
- List of National Historic Landmarks in Illinois
- National Register of Historic Places listings in Illinois
