= List of City of Peoria historic landmarks and districts =

List of local historic sites in Peoria, Illinois

Historic Landmarks and Districts is a designation of the City of Peoria Historic Preservation Commission (HPC). Many of these landmarks are also listed on the National Register of Historic Places. Peoria has 6 local historic districts, 5 national historic districts, and 24 local historic landmarks.

== Historic Preservation Commission ==
The City of Peoria's Historic Preservation Commission (HPC) approves new historic districts and landmarks and ensures historic site maintain their character. Peoria's Historic Preservation Ordinance was adopted by the City Council in 1976 and amended in 1989. The Historic Preservation Commission was authorized by Section 16-36.

=== Guidelines ===
The HPC has adopted guidelines are based on the ten standards of rehabilitation from the National Park Service.

=== Criteria ===
To submit a landmark or district for historic designation, applicants must include a map, pictures, and a narrative demonstrating how the proposed landmark meets criteria in Section 16-38 of the Historic Preservation Ordinance.

(a) The historic preservation commission shall upon such investigation as it deems necessary, make a determination as to whether a nominated property, structure or area meets one or more of the following criteria.

1. Its character, interest or value as part of the development, heritage or cultural characteristics of the city, the county, the state or the United States of America deems it historically significant.
2. Its location as a site of a significant local, county, state or national event.
3. Its identification with a person who significantly contributed to the development of the city, the state or the nation.
4. Its embodiment of distinguishing characteristics of an architectural style valuable for the study of a period, type, method of construction or use of indigenous materials.
5. Its identification as the work of a master building designer, architect or landscape architect whose individual work has influenced the development of the city, the state or the nation.
6. Its embodiment of elements of design, detailing, or craftsmanship that render it architecturally significant.
7. Its embodiment of design elements that make it structurally or architecturally innovative.
8. Its unique location or singular physical characteristics that make it an established or familiar visual feature.
9. Its character as a particularly fine or unique example of a utilitarian structure with a high level of integrity or architectural significance.
10. The owner(s) consent.

(b) Any structure, property or area that meets one or more of the above criteria shall also be suitable for preservation or restoration and have sufficient integrity of location, design, materials, and workmanship to make it worthy of preservation or restoration.

== List of landmarks ==
=== Individual landmarks ===
Landmark Name	Image	Location	Built	Designation date	NRHP date
Annette Smith Clemenceau Residence		1517 W Barker Avenue	1902	December 2010	N/A
Charles Duryea Residence		1512 W Barker Avenue	1897	July 2015	N/A
Edward S. Easton Residence (Endsley Funeral Home)		1125 Main Street	1882	February 1994	N/A
Grand Army of the Republic (GAR Hall) and Greenhut Memorial		416 Hamilton Blvd	1909	March 1996	July 13, 1976
Irving Primary School		519 NE Glendale Avenue	1898	August 2006	N/A
John H. Hall Residence		1415 NE Perry Avenue	1859	August 1993	N/A
Judge Jacob Gale House		403-403 1/2 NE Jefferson Street	c. 1839	November 1989	March 19, 1982
Judge John C. Flanagan Residence		942 NE Glen Oak Avenue	1837	November 2023	March 19, 1982
Lincoln Carnegie Library		1312 W Lincoln Avenue	1910	June 2009	May 28, 2014
McClure Library Branch		315 W McClure Avenue	1937	August 2014	N/A
Musician’s Hall		405 N Kumpf Boulevard	1856	March 1996	March 18, 1980
Peoria City Hall		419 Fulton Street	1895-1898	February 1991	February 6, 1973
Peoria Mineral Springs and Residence		701 W Dr. Martin Luther King Jr Drive	c. 1843	June 1994	March 5, 1982
Peoria Women’s Club		301 NE Madison Avenue	1893	April 2013	N/A
Pettengill-Morron House		1212 W Moss Avenue	1868	December 2021	April 2, 1976
Residence		802 NE Perry Street	1890s	June 1994	N/A
Residence		1412 NE Perry Avenue	1911	November 2010	N/A
Residence		514 NE Madison	1890s	May 1994	N/A
Residence		516 NE Madison	1890s	March 1994	N/A
Rock Island Depot and Freight House		212 SW Water Street (32 Liberty Street)	1899	May 1999	December 22, 1978
Springdale Cemetery		3014 N Prospect Road	1855	May 1998	December 10, 2004
Springdale Cemetery Gatehouse		3014 N Prospect Road	1854 Demolished 2010	June 1999	N/A

=== Historic Districts ===
==== National Historic Districts ====
Landmark Name	Image
Downtown Peoria National Historic District	
Grand View Drive National Historic District	
Northside National Historic District	
Warehouse National Historic District	
West Bluff National Historic District	

==== Local Historic Districts ====
Landmark Name	Image
Flora-Ellis Historic District	
Glen Oak Historic District	
Knoxville Avenue Historic District	
Moss-High Historic District	
Perry Avenue Historic District	
Randolph-Roanoke Historic District	

==== Local Historic Streets ====
Landmark Name	Image
400, 500, 600 Blocks of Armstrong Avenue	
Hamilton Boulevard Median	

== See also ==
- National Register of Historic Places listings in Peoria County, Illinois
