= National Register of Historic Places listings in Knox County, Illinois =

Location of Knox County in Illinois

This is a list of the National Register of Historic Places listings in Knox County, Illinois.

This is intended to be a complete list of the properties and districts on the National Register of Historic Places in Knox County, Illinois, United States. Latitude and longitude coordinates are provided for many National Register properties and districts; these locations may be seen together in a map.

There are 7 properties and districts listed on the National Register in the county. Another property was once listed but has been removed.

This National Park Service list is complete through NPS recent listings posted December 12, 2025.

== Current listings ==
	Name on the Register	Image	Date listed	Location	City or town	Description
1	J. Newton Conger House	J. Newton Conger House	April 20, 1979 (#79003111)	334 N. Knox St. 41°04′33″N 90°13′41″W	Oneida	
2	Galesburg Historic District	Galesburg Historic District	November 21, 1976 (#76000715)	Roughly bounded by Berrien, Clark, Pearl, and Sanborn Sts. 40°57′07″N 90°22′09″W	Galesburg	
3	Knox County Courthouse and Hall of Records	Knox County Courthouse and Hall of Records	February 13, 1992 (#92000051)	Public Sq., Main St. 40°54′30″N 90°17′04″W	Knoxville	
4	Knox County Jail	Knox County Jail	February 13, 1992 (#92000050)	Public Sq., Market St. 40°54′31″N 90°17′07″W	Knoxville	
5	Meetinghouse of the Central Congregational Church	Meetinghouse of the Central Congregational Church	September 30, 1976 (#76000716)	Central Sq. 40°56′48″N 90°22′18″W	Galesburg	
6	Old Main, Knox College	Old Main, Knox College	October 15, 1966 (#66000323)	Knox College campus 40°56′36″N 90°22′14″W	Galesburg	Charles Ulricson, architect. Site of the October 7, 1858 Lincoln–Douglas debate.
7	Walnut Grove Farm	Walnut Grove Farm	August 24, 1989 (#89001114)	Knox Station Rd., 1 mile (1.6 km) north of Knoxville; 40°55′11″N 90°16′07″W	Knoxville	

== Former listing ==
	Name on the Register	Image	Date listed	Date removed	Location	City or town	Description
1	Wolf Covered Bridge		December 4, 1974 (#74000763)	December 8, 1995	NW of Yates City on CR 17 over Spoon River	Yates City	Destroyed by fire in 1994.

== See also ==
- List of National Historic Landmarks in Illinois
- National Register of Historic Places listings in Illinois
