= Francis W. Little House =

Francis W. Little House may refer to either of two houses designed by Frank Lloyd Wright:

- Francis W. Little House I, in Peoria, Illinois
- Francis W. Little House II, demolished, formerly in Deephaven, Minnesota
