= Pleasant Grove School =

Pleasant Grove School may refer to:

- Pleasant Grove School (Eden, Illinois), listed on the National Register of Historic Places in Peoria County, Illinois
- Pleasant Grove School (Pleasant Grove, Utah), listed on the National Register of Historic Places in Utah County, Utah
