= Smithville, Illinois =

- Census-designated place
- Location within Illinois Location within the United States
- Coordinates: 40°39′32″N 89°48′11″W
- Country: United States
- State: Illinois
- County: Peoria
- Township: Logan

Area
  - Total: 1.27 sq mi (3.28 km^{2})
  - Land: 1.27 sq mi (3.28 km^{2})
  - Water: 0 sq mi (0.00 km^{2})
- Elevation: 709 ft (216 m)

Population (2020)
  - Total: 157
  - Density: 124/sq mi (47.9/km^{2})
- Time zone: UTC-6 (Central (CST))
  - Summer (DST): UTC-5 (CDT)
- ZIP Code: 61536 (Hanna City)
- Area code: 309
- FIPS code: 17-70278
- GNIS feature ID: 2804096

Smithville is an unincorporated community and census-designated place (CDP) in Peoria County, Illinois, United States. It is in the southern part of the county, in the center of Logan Township. It is 2 miles (3 km) south of Hanna City and 13 miles (21 km) west-southwest of downtown Peoria.

Smithville was first listed as a CDP prior to the 2020 census. As of the 2020 census, Smithville had a population of 157.

== Demographics ==
Historical population
Census	Pop.	Note	%±
2020	157		—
U.S. Decennial Census

Smithville first appeared as a census designated place in the 2020 U.S. census.

=== 2020 census ===
Smithville CDP, Illinois – Racial and ethnic composition Note: the US Census treats Hispanic/Latino as an ethnic category. This table excludes Latinos from the racial categories and assigns them to a separate category. Hispanics/Latinos may be of any race.
Race / Ethnicity (NH = Non-Hispanic)	Pop 2020	2020
White alone (NH)	148	94.27%
Black or African American alone (NH)	1	0.64%
Native American or Alaska Native alone (NH)	0	0.00%
Asian alone (NH)	2	1.27%
Native Hawaiian or Pacific Islander alone (NH)	0	0.00%
Other race alone (NH)	0	0.00%
Mixed race or Multiracial (NH)	3	1.91%
Hispanic or Latino (any race)	3	1.91%
Total	157	100.00%

== Education ==
The school district is Farmington Central Community Unit School District 265.
