= Eden, Illinois =

Eden, Illinois may refer to the following places in the U.S. state of Illinois:

- Eden, Peoria County, Illinois
- Eden, Randolph County, Illinois
