= Old Main, Knox College =

- U.S. National Register of Historic Places
- U.S. National Historic Landmark
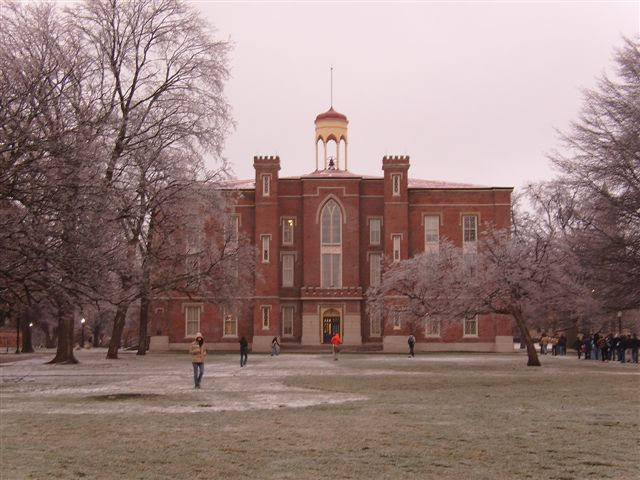
- Old Main in winter 2007

- Location within Illinois Location within the United States
- Location: Knox College campus, Galesburg, Illinois
- Coordinates: 40°56′36″N 90°22′16″W
- Built: 1857
- Architect: Charles Ulricson
- Architectural style: Gothic Revival
- NRHP reference No.: 66000323

Significant dates
- Added to NRHP: October 15, 1966
- Designated NHL: July 4, 1961

Old Main is the oldest building on the campus of Knox College in Galesburg, Illinois. Completed in 1857, it is a distinctive Gothic Tudor design of Swedish architect Charles Ulricson. It was designated a National Historic Landmark in 1961 as one of the few surviving sites to host one of the famous 1858 Lincoln–Douglas debates. The building underwent a major restoration in the 1930s, which modernized its interior and restored its exterior.

== Description and history ==
Old Main is located on the north side of the Knox College campus, south of South Street between Alumni Hall and George Davis Hall. It is a three-story masonry structure, built out of brick with limestone and concrete trim. It is designed in part to resemble England's Hampton Court Palace, with a pair of projecting polygonal towers topped by crenellated parapets flanking its main entrance. The entrance is itself in a projecting section, in a rounded-arch opening set beneath a tall Gothic-arched window. Limestone stringcourses run between the first and second floors, and above the third floor.

Old Main was completed in 1857, and is the oldest surviving building on the Knox College campus. It was designed by Charles Ulricson, a Swedish-trained architect working out of Peoria. At the time, the campus included Old Main and two dormitories, neither of which has survived. Old Main housed most of the school's academic functions for many years, including classrooms and a chapel. By the early 1930s it was in deteriorating condition, and underwent a major restoration. The interior was gutted, replaced by a flooring system of steel and concrete, while interior brick and stone were recycled to repair the exterior. Portions of the limestone trim were replaced with cast concrete at this time. In 1969, a tornado took off the belfry and part of the roof; these were rebuilt in the original style.

== Lincoln-Douglas debate ==
On October 7, 1858, Old Main was the site of the fifth in the celebrated series of debates between Abraham Lincoln and Stephen Douglas, then both running for the United States Senate. The debate was conducted on a platform constructed in front of the building, which the debaters reached by climbing through its windows. The college community, founded by abolitionists, strung a banner behind the platform which read "Knox College for Lincoln". The debate was attended by a crowd estimated at 15,000. The National Historic Landmark designation, made in 1961, includes the college grounds to the east where most of the crowd sat.

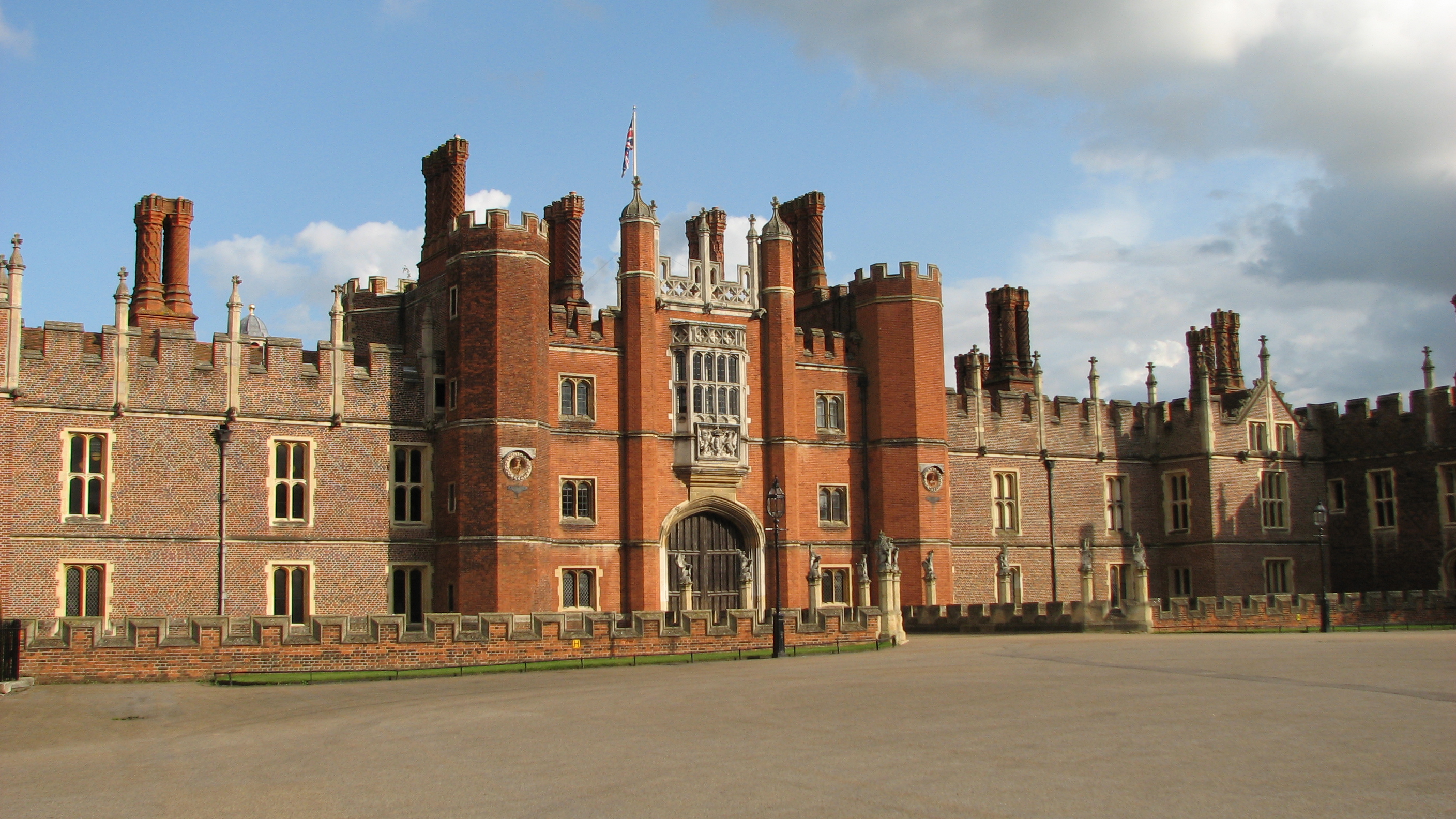
Hampton Court Palace, London, England. Charles Ulricson's inspiration for Old Main.

== See also ==
- List of National Historic Landmarks in Illinois
- National Register of Historic Places listings in Knox County, Illinois
