= Christ Church of Lower Kickapoo =

Historic church in Illinois, United States

Christ Church
- Christ Church Limestone
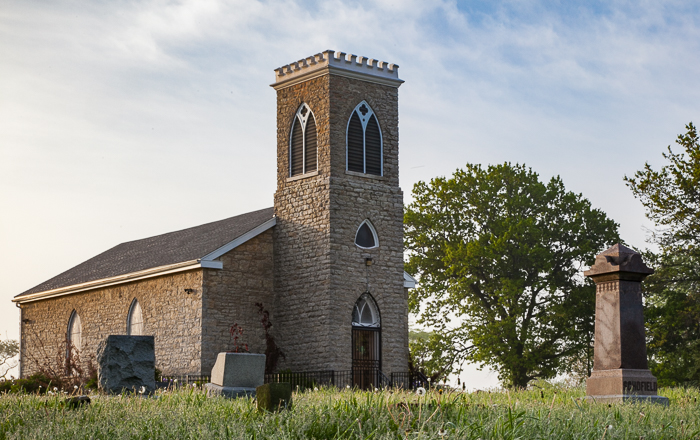
- Church and graveyard, 2011

- Location in Peoria County, Illinois
- 40.70701°N 89.71675°W
- Location: Limestone Township, Peoria County, Illinois
- Address: 1604 N Christ Church Rd, Hanna City, Illinois
- Country: United States
- Denomination: Anglican Church in North America
- Previous denomination: Episcopal Church
- Website: christchurchlimestone.org

History
- Founded: 1834
- Consecrated: December 10, 1845

Architecture
- Completed: December 10, 1845

Administration
- Diocese: Diocese of Quincy (ACNA)

The Christ Church of Lower Kickapoo, also known as Christ Church Limestone or the Old Stone Church, is in Limestone Township, Peoria County, Illinois near Norwood, Illinois. The church was included in the National Register of Historic Places in 1983.

== Architecture ==
The church was constructed by church members primarily from local materials in the architectural style of their homelands. The cornerstone was laid on May 17, 1844, and the finished structure was consecrated on December 10, 1845. Limestone for the construction was quarried from a nearby creek and the gated pews were hewn from local black walnut.

By way of a letter writing campaign directed to Queen Adelaide, Queen Victoria is considered a donor towards the cost of the construction of the primary building. As a result, the church bell was donated for her Silver Jubilee celebration in 1887. The bell was cast by Clinton H. Meneely Company of Troy, New York. The bell bears the inscription, "Laus Deo Allelus", Christ Church, Limestone, Peoria, Illinois, Advent 1887. The bell tower was constructed from stone of the house of John Flatman in 1889. Frank Burlet was the stonemason, assisted by Dr. N.A. Johnston.

Three out of five stained glass windows commemorate early parishioners. The east window behind the altar was dedicated in 1880 and created by English artisans. The southeast window was dedicated in 1891.

The oak ceiling and cyprus beams were improrted from Georgia in 1892.

== History ==
The congregation began at what is now Norwood (formerly Jones Hollow), by English and Welsh immigrants in 1834. Philander Chase, the first Bishop of the Diocese of Illinois, accepted the congregation into the Diocese informally in early fall of 1836. The parish was formally received into the Diocese of Illinois in 1838. At this time, services were still held in parishioners' homes.

Construction began in the spring of 1844 and was completed in the autumn of 1845.

In 1851, Rev. John Benson was named the first rector of the church.

The congregation had 100 church members in 1887, but membership declined. Regular services were suspended in 1934. Restoration efforts began in the 1950s, and weekly services resumed in October 1960.

The Parish Hall was built in 2008, bringing running water to the building for the first time.

Formerly an Episcopal congregation, Christ Church Limestone is now a member of the Anglican Church, Diocese of Quincy. As of 2015, the congregation has between 20 and 30 members.
