= Peoria Automobile Club =

- U.S. National Register of Historic Places
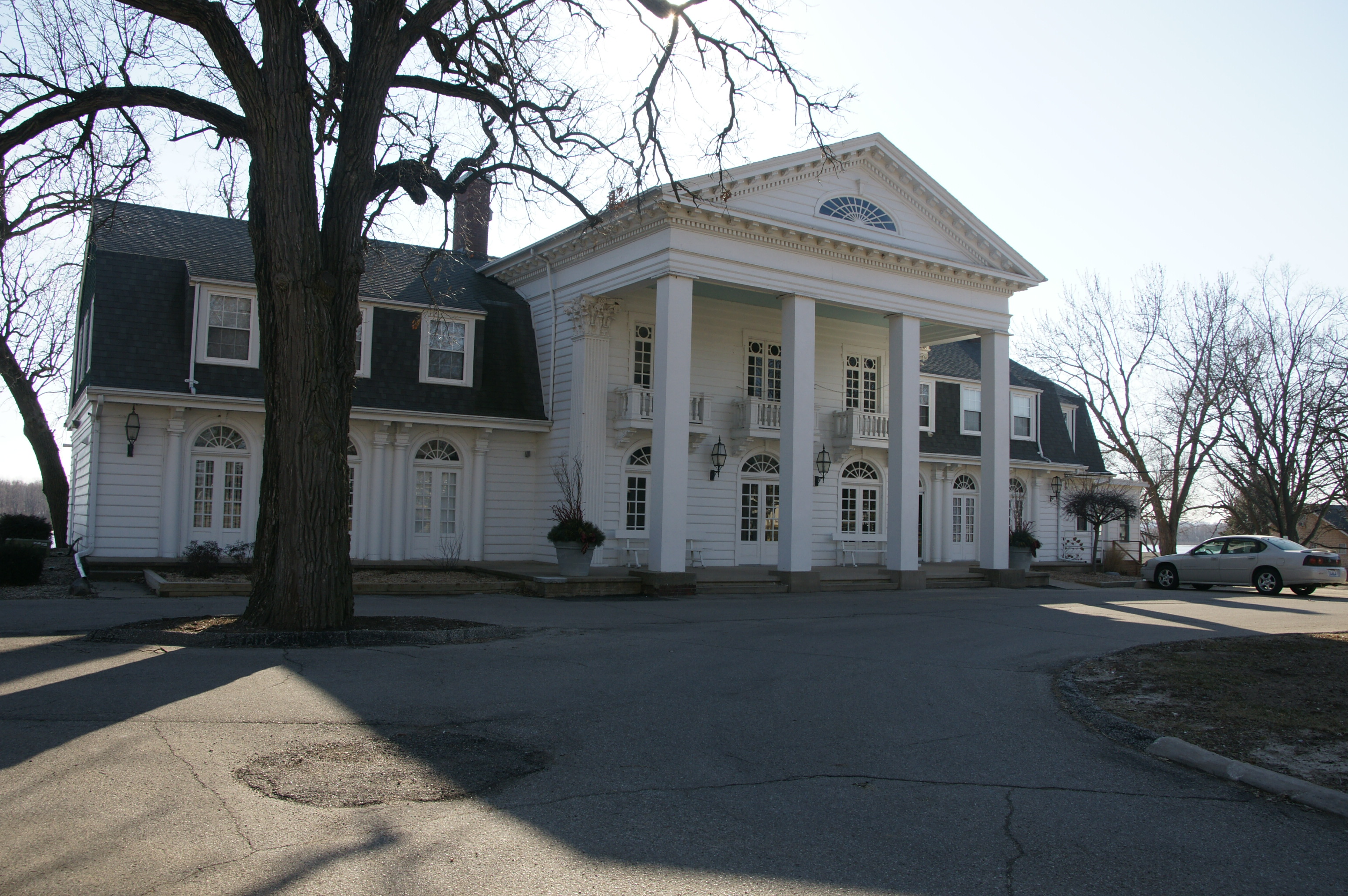

- Location within Peoria County, Illinois
- Location: 100 Park Blvd., Chillicothe, Illinois
- Coordinates: 40°54′12″N 89°29′24″W
- Area: 2.2 acres (0.89 ha)
- Built: 1915
- Architect: Hotchkiss & Harris
- Architectural style: Classical Revival
- NRHP reference No.: 95000984
- Added to NRHP: August 4, 1995

Shore Acres Park Clubhouse (known by its former name, the Peoria Automobile Club) is the central feature of Shore Acres Park in Chillicothe, Illinois. The site of the clubhouse, which is located on the Illinois River, was originally part of Columbia Park, a Chillicothe city park established in 1890. In 1911, the Peoria Automobile Club was formed as a social and recreational organization for the automobile owners of Peoria and the surrounding cities; the club soon purchased the park from the city. The club built their clubhouse at the park in 1915; Peoria architects Hotchkiss & Harris provided its Classical Revival design. One of the club's main functions was to advocate for improved roads in Peoria and Central Illinois; in particular, they advocated for a route from Peoria to Chicago that would pass their clubhouse. The 1918 State Bond Issue, which established Illinois' state highway system, provided funding for this route, which became known as Illinois Route 29.

As automobiles became more common in the 1920s, the club changed its name to the Peoria North Shore Country Club and added a golf course and swimming pool in an attempt to rebrand itself. The country club was unsuccessful and went bankrupt in 1935. After passing through multiple private owners, the land was purchased by the Chillicothe Park Board in 1948; it is now a public park, and the clubhouse is used as a community center and the Park District's offices.

The clubhouse was added to the National Register of Historic Places on August 4, 1995. It is Chillicothe's only listing on the National Register and one of several that are in smaller towns and cities in Peoria County outside the main city of Peoria, Illinois.
