= Pleasant Grove School (Eden, Illinois) =

- U.S. National Register of Historic Places
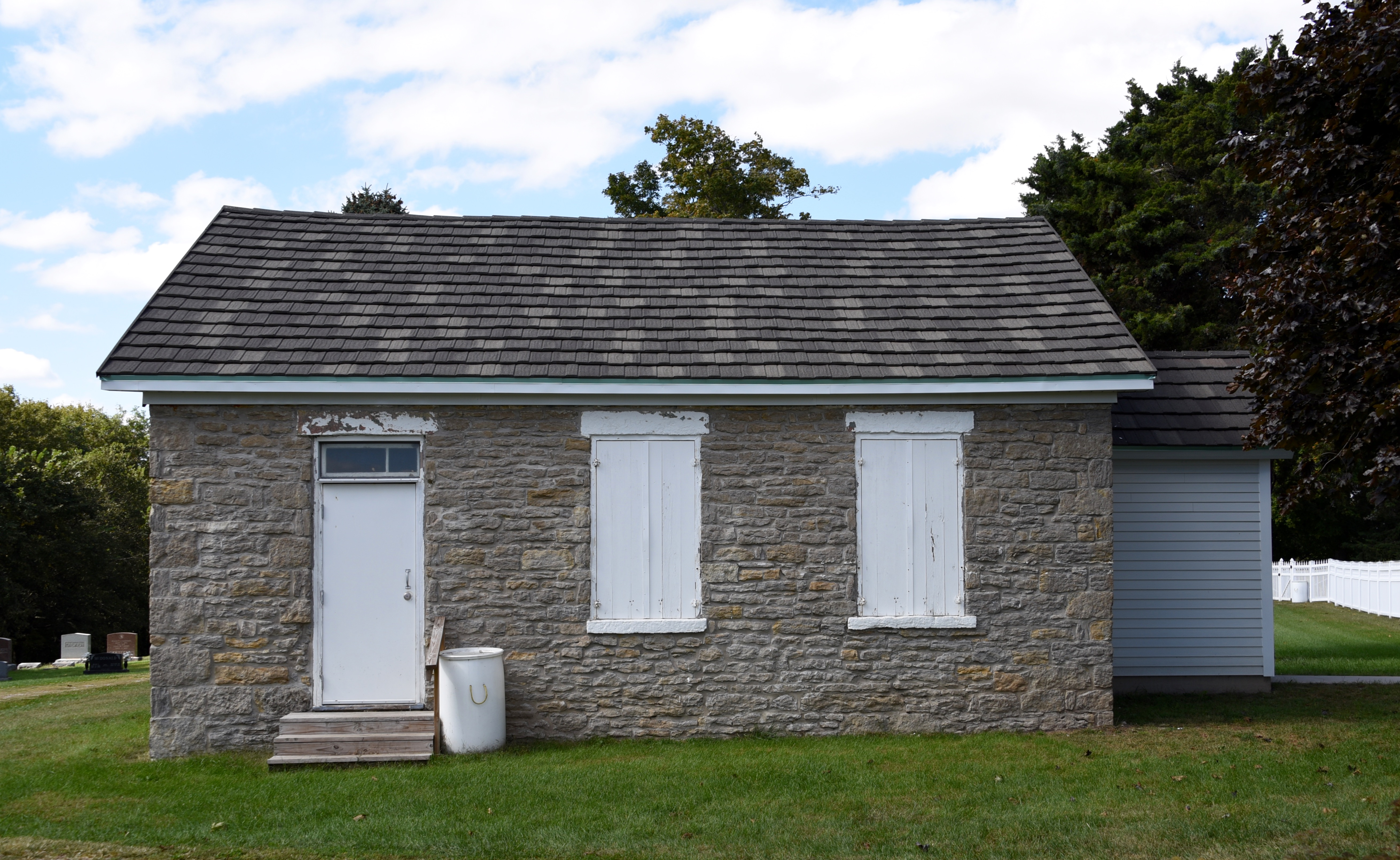

- Location within Peoria County, Illinois Location within Illinois Location within the United States
- Nearest city: Eden, Illinois
- Coordinates: 40°40′41″N 89°50′43″W
- Area: less than one acre
- Built: 1856
- Built by: Lobaugh, Joel
- NRHP reference No.: 94000435
- Added to NRHP: May 19, 1994

The Pleasant Grove School is a historic school building located in Logan Township, Peoria County, Illinois, near the community of Eden. The one-room schoolhouse was built in 1856 to educate the children of Pleasant Grove, the name for the surrounding community at the time. The school was built on the same property as the community's church, which has since been demolished, and its cemetery. Local stonemason Joel Lobaugh built the school from locally quarried, rough coursed limestone; his design was utilitarian, with limestone window sills and lintels being the only decorative elements. The school served students until 1945, when all of Logan Township's schools consolidated into a single school in Eden.

The school was added to the National Register of Historic Places on May 19, 1994.
