= Illinois Waterway Project Office =

- U.S. National Register of Historic Places
- U.S. Historic district
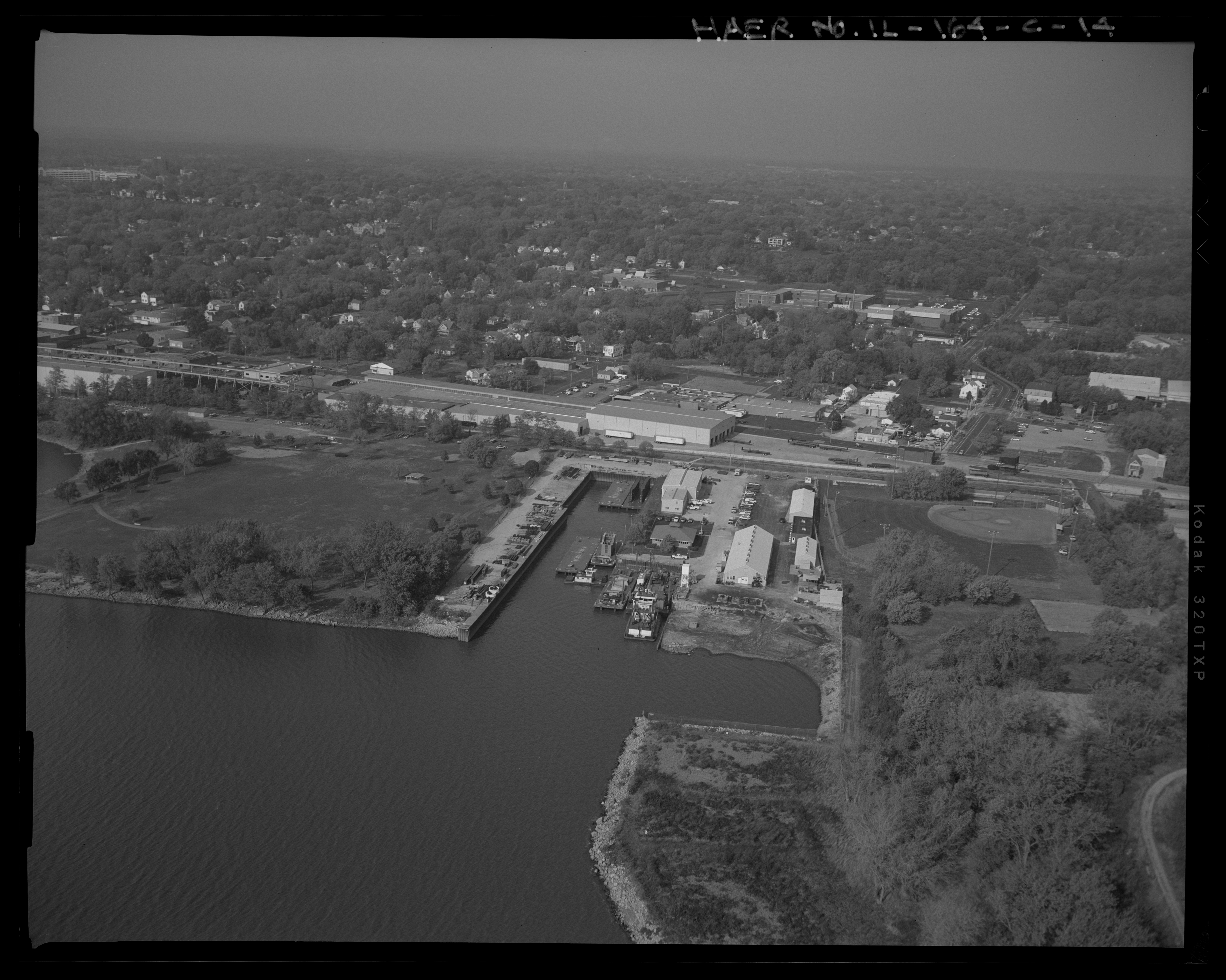
- An aerial view of the complex from the Historic American Engineering Record

- Location within Peoria County, Illinois
- Interactive map of Illinois Waterway Project Office
- Location: 257 Grant St., Peoria, Illinois
- Coordinates: 40°42′16″N 89°33′58″W
- Area: 10 acres (4.0 ha)
- Built: 1913
- Built by: U.S. Army Corps of Engineers
- MPS: Illinois Waterway Navigation System Facilities MPS
- NRHP reference No.: 04000168
- Added to NRHP: March 10, 2004

The Illinois Waterway Project Office is a maintenance shop and project office for the Illinois Waterway, the system of rivers and canals through Illinois which connect the Mississippi River to Lake Michigan. The complex, which is also a national historic district, is located at 257 Grant Street in Peoria, Illinois, on the west bank of the Illinois River. The U.S. Army Corps of Engineers established the office in 1913 to house and maintain its boats; it developed into its current role in the 1920s and 1930s. The maintenance buildings at the complex were mainly built during this later period of development; five of these buildings are considered contributing buildings to the historic district. The 1913 harbor and marine ways are also part of the historic district, as are three of the boats stationed in the harbor.

The office was added to the National Register of Historic Places on March 10, 2004.
