= Cumberland Presbyterian Church (Peoria, Illinois) =

Historic church in Illinois, United States

- U.S. National Register of Historic Places
- City of Peoria Local Historic Landmark
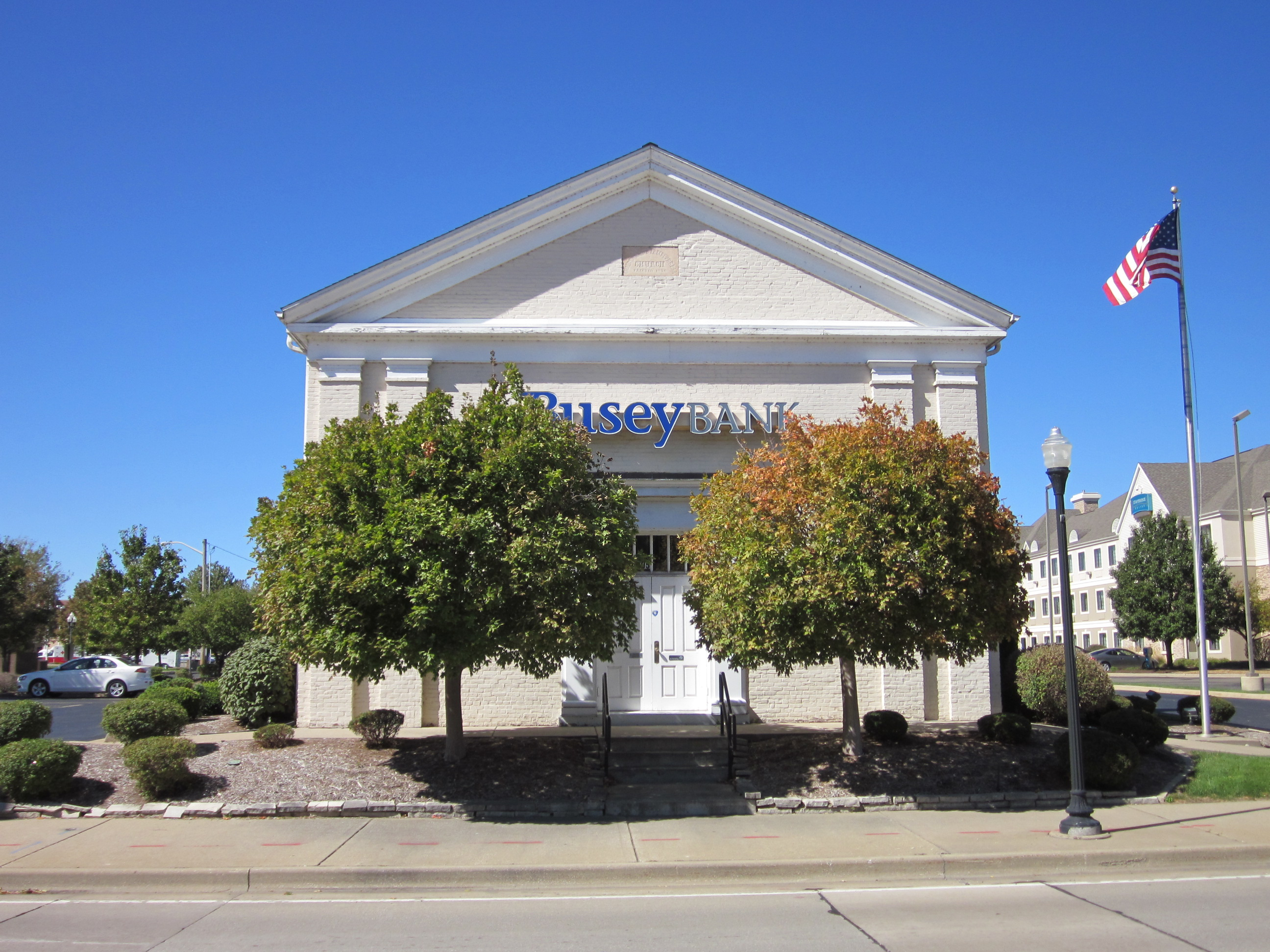

- Location within Illinois Location within the United States
- Location: 405 N William Kumpf Blvd, Peoria, Peoria County, Illinois (Formerly 405 N. Monson St)
- Coordinates: 40°41′33.3″N 89°35′46″W
- Built: 1856
- Architectural style: Greek Revival
- NRHP reference No.: 80001401
- Added to NRHP: March 18, 1980

The Cumberland Presbyterian Church, also known as the Peoria Musicians Club or Musicians Hall, is the oldest standing church building in Peoria, Illinois, United States. The church was constructed in 1856 as the First Cumberland Presbyterian Church. It was used by various churches and a synagogue until 1913, when it was bought by the American Federation of Musicians Local 26. The building was added to the National Register of Historic Places on March 18, 1980. The building is also a City of Peoria Historic Landmark as of March 1996. It is now a branch of Busey Bank.

== History ==
On March 3, 1855, the Cumberland-Presbyterian Church was organized and a small building was built on North Monson Street, between Fourth and Fifth streets. Rev. S.T. Stewart was the preacher.

In 1863, the church was sold and became the St. John's Episcopal Church. Rev. John Benson was the preacher.

In 1875, the church was sold again to become the First German Baptist Church; the congregation later became the North Sheridan Baptist Church.

In 1897, the building was purchased by the Agudas Achim congregation.

In 1911, it was briefly used as a YMCA training school for Black youth.

After serving as a church for three different congregations, the Musician’s Union Local 26 acquired the building in 1913.
