= Washington C. Wear House =

Historic house in Illinois, United States

- U.S. National Register of Historic Places
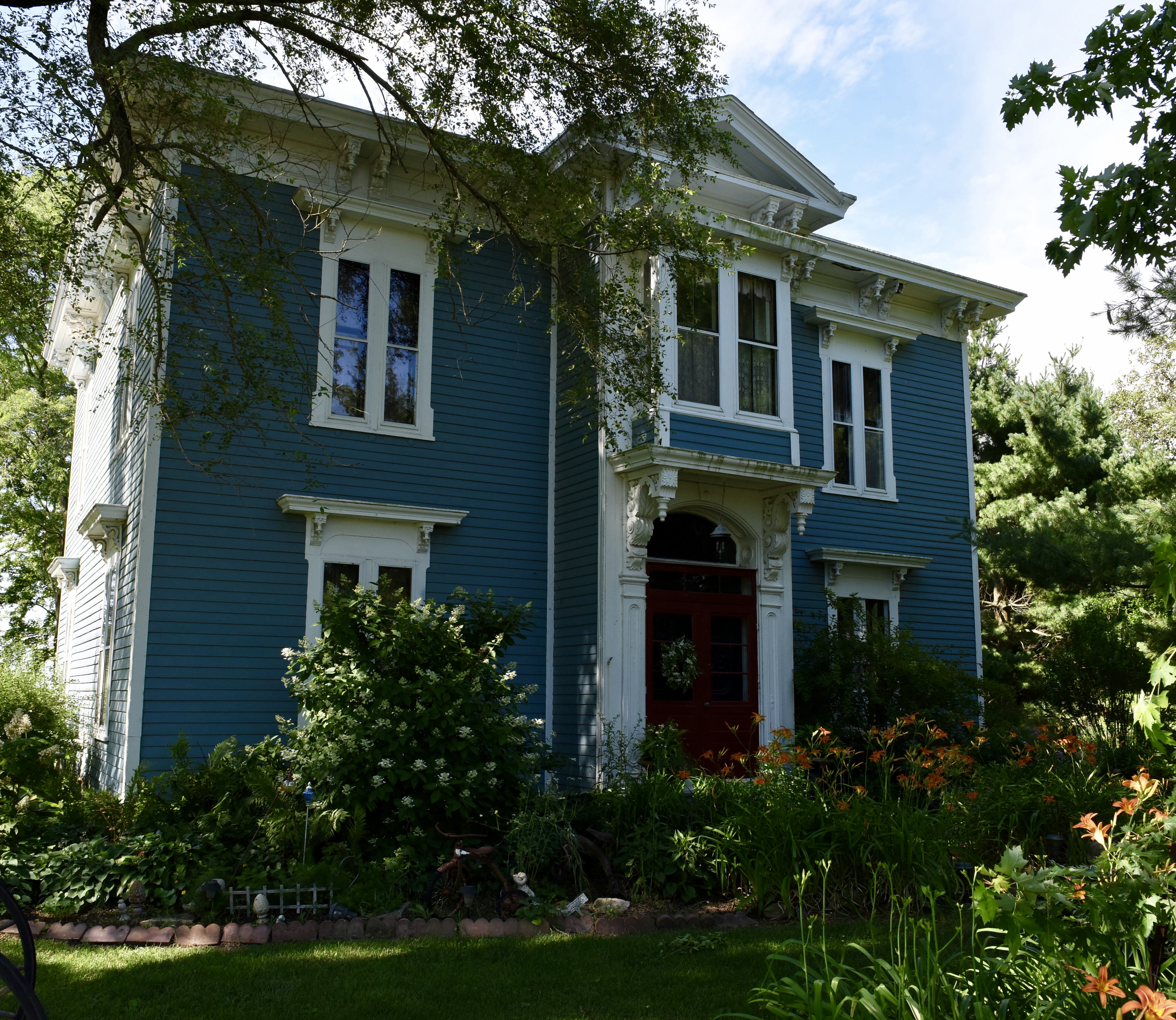

- Location within Illinois Location within the United States
- Location: 1 mi. S and 0.4 mi. W of jct. of IL 90 and IL 91, Princeville, Illinois
- Coordinates: 40°54′55″N 89°45′53″W
- Area: less than one acre
- Built: 1870
- Architectural style: Italianate
- NRHP reference No.: 93000838
- Added to NRHP: August 19, 1993

The Washington C. Wear House is a historic house located south of Princeville, Peoria County, Illinois. Washington C. Wear, a farmer from Ohio, had the house built in 1870. The house has an Italianate design which a local architectural survey regarded as one of the best examples of the style in rural Peoria County. The two-story projecting front entrance includes a porch with square posts, an arched doorway and paired second-story windows, and a gabled pediment at the top. The house's windows are tall and narrow with bracketed hoods. The hip roof atop the house features wide eaves and paired brackets along the cornice.

The house was added to the National Register of Historic Places on August 19, 1993.
