= Eden, Peoria County, Illinois =

Eden, Illinois
- Unincorporated community
- Location within Illinois Location within the United States
- Coordinates: 40°41′20″N 89°49′58″W
- Country: United States
- State: Illinois
- County: Peoria
- Elevation: 728 ft (222 m)
- Time zone: UTC-6 (Central (CST))
  - Summer (DST): UTC-5 (CDT)
- Area code: 309
- GNIS feature ID: 407765

Eden is an unincorporated community in Logan Township, Peoria County, Illinois, United States. Eden is located on Eden Road and the Union Pacific Railroad 2 miles (3.2 km) west of Hanna City.

== History ==
Eden was originally called Milo, and under the latter name was founded in the 1880s when the railroad was extended to that point. A post office was established under the name Eden in 1882, and remained in operation until the 1960s.
