= Peoria City Hall =

- U.S. National Register of Historic Places
- City of Peoria Local Historic Landmark
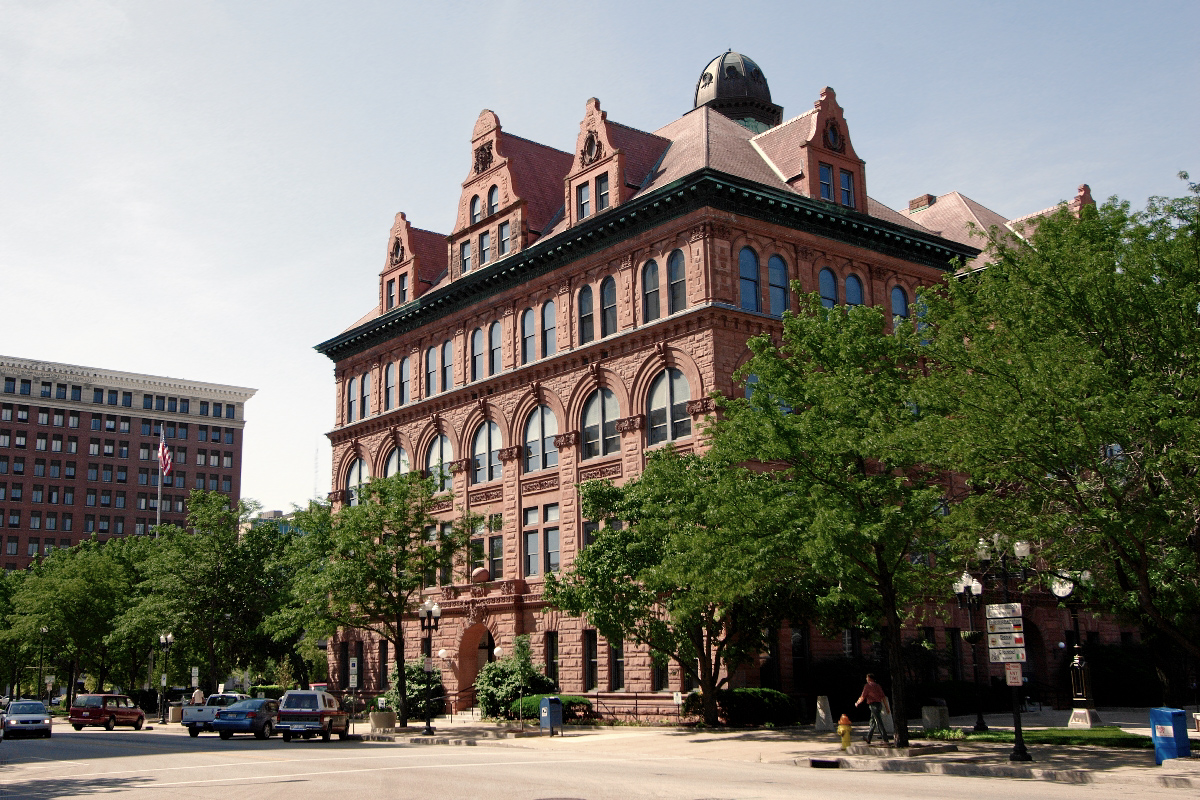

- Location within Peoria County, Illinois
- Location: 419 Fulton St., Peoria, Illinois
- Coordinates: 40°41′33″N 89°35′35″W
- Area: 0.8 acres (0.32 ha)
- Built: 1897-1899
- Architect: Reeves and Baillee
- Architectural style: German Renaissance
- NRHP reference No.: 73000715
- Added to NRHP: February 6, 1973

Peoria City Hall, located in the United States city of Peoria, Illinois, is a historic red sandstone building designed by Reeves and Baillee. The city hall was built in 1897 and dedicated in January 1899. The building is still Peoria's city hall.

== Architecture ==
Peoria City Hall was designed and built by Reeves and Baillee in 1897 for US$271,500.

The Flemish Renaissance structure was designed so that any one of its four sides could serve as the front. The exterior is red sandstone from the Lake Superior region, quarried in 1890.

The Victorian cupola bell tower from the original city hall building is at the peak. The 4,300-lb bell was built in 1865.

During construction, a cornerstone of the building was left open for residents were to drop in personal or historic items that would be sealed inside.

The city hall was dedicated January 5 to January 7, 1899. At the ceremony, Civil War hero turned mayor Maj. John Warner said, “Chicago has one larger and far more expensive, but gloomy and dark within; while this is lightsome, bright and cheerful in every department.”

The interior has a marble staircase, ironwork railings, and stained glass windows. An 1889 statue “Love Knows No Caste” by artist Fritz Triebel is visible in the front hall.

In 1912, a mural was commissioned. The interior mural depicts muses of learning, peace, and medicine along with symbols of the community and its industries.

== Significant Events ==
In the 1960s, Peoria City Hall was the site of public speeches by Adlai Stevenson III, Edward Kennedy, and Lyndon Johnson.

The building was listed on the National Register of Historic Places in February 1973.

The Peoria Civic Center was built behind it in 1982.

In 2017, Engaging Local Government Leaders (ELGL) awarded the City of Peoria the Leslie B. Knope Trophy for "Best City Hall".
