= Lincoln Branch Peoria Public Library =

- U.S. National Register of Historic Places
- City of Peoria Local Historic Landmark
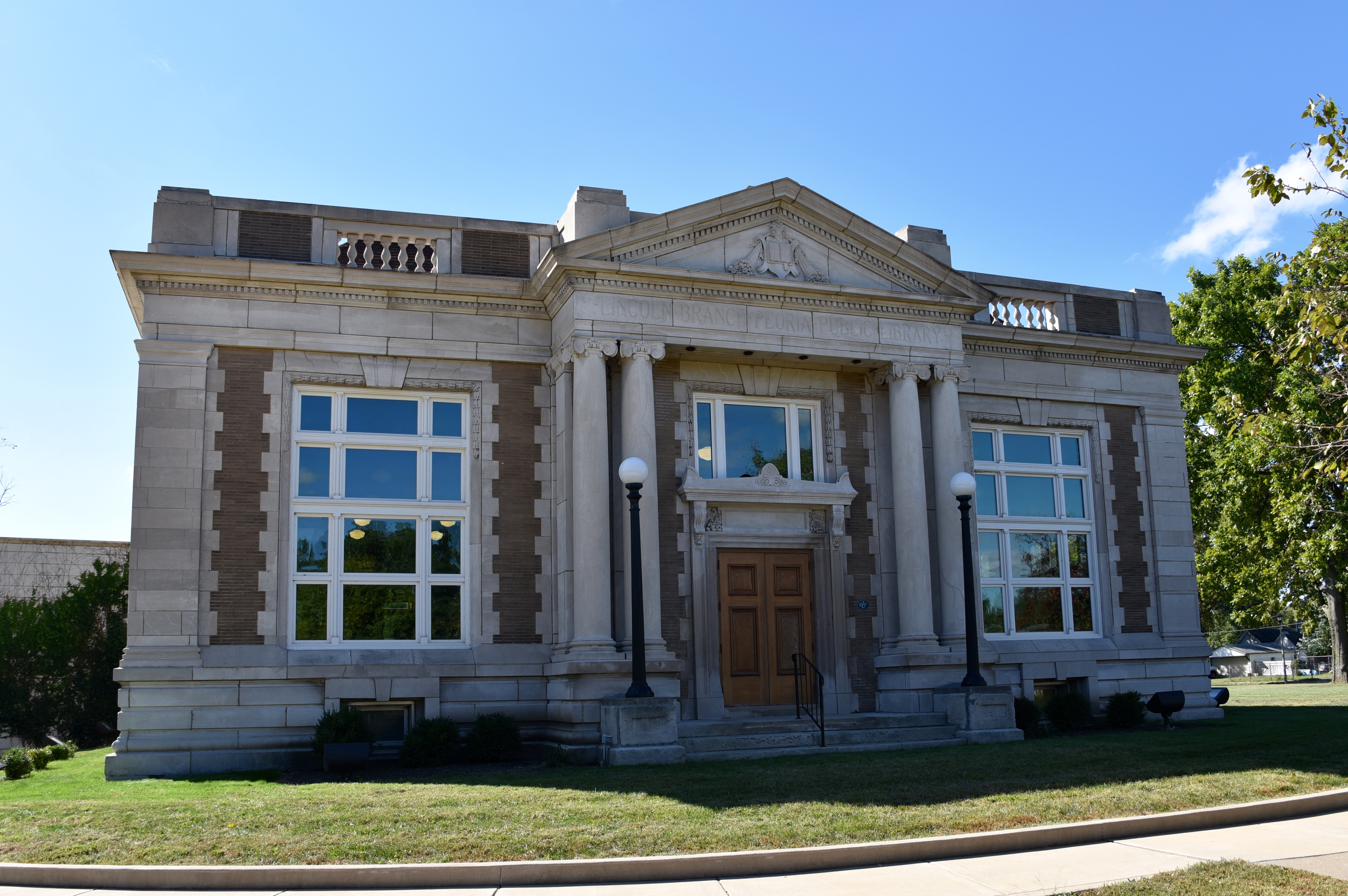
- Interactive map of Lincoln Branch Peoria Public Library
- Location: 1312 W. Lincoln Ave., Peoria, Illinois
- Coordinates: 40°40′53″N 89°36′52″W
- Built: 1910-11
- Built by: John J. McDonald
- Architect: Hotchkiss & Harris
- Architectural style: Classical Revival
- NRHP reference No.: 14000256
- Added to NRHP: May 28, 2014

The Lincoln Branch Peoria Public Library is a Carnegie library located at 1312 West Lincoln Avenue in Peoria, Illinois. Built in 1910, the building served as the first dedicated library building on Peoria's South Side. The South Side branch library opened in 1903 in a building called the Neighborhood House; however, it had outgrown its space in the building by 1909. The city petitioned the Carnegie Foundation for funding for a new library and the Foundation provided a $20,000 grant for the building. The city passed a $2,000 annual tax to cover the library's maintenance. Peoria architecture firm Hotchkiss & Harris supplied a Classical Revival design for the building, and construction began in 1910 and was completed the following year. The new building was dedicated on June 16, 1911.

The library became popular with neighborhood residents, setting city records for daily circulation; it also held special collections serving the city's Lebanese and German immigrant communities.

With $500,000 from the Plaedes Foundation, the Lincoln Branch was remodeled in 1993. In June 2009, the library was designated by the City of Peoria as a local historic landmark. The library was added to the National Register of Historic Places on May 28, 2014. In 2014, the Peoria Historical Society awarded the library a Historic Preservation Award.
