= International Harvester Building =

- U.S. National Register of Historic Places
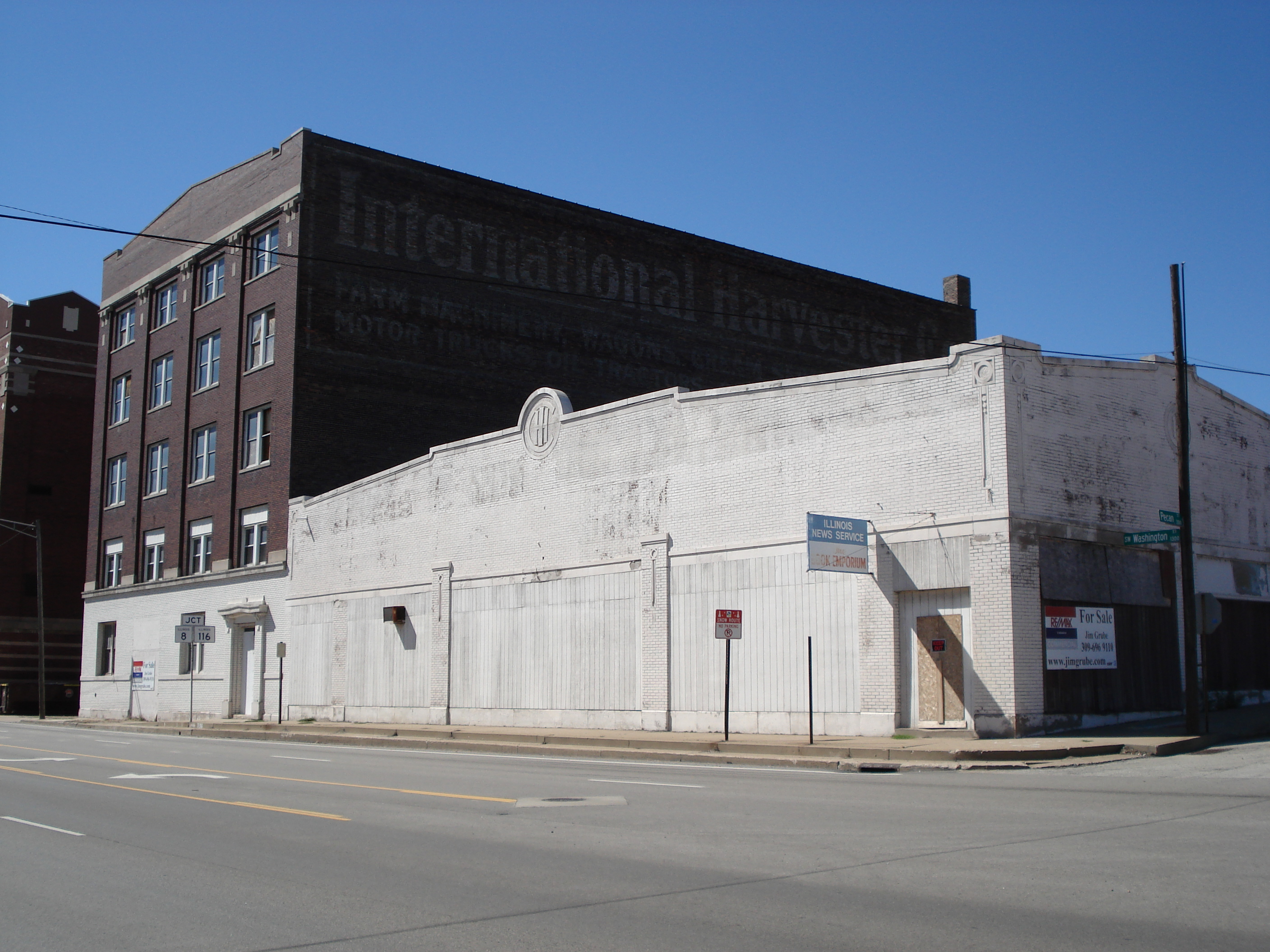

- Location within Illinois Location within the United States
- Location: 1301-1309 Southwest Washington St., Peoria, Illinois
- Coordinates: 40°40′53″N 89°36′11″W
- Area: less than one acre
- Built: 1914, c. 1925
- Architect: Price, W.D.
- Architectural style: Classical Revival, Commercial Prairie style, Art Deco
- NRHP reference No.: 05001254
- Added to NRHP: November 15, 2005

The International Harvester Building is a five-story building in the U.S. city of Peoria, Illinois. The property consists of the 1914 five-story building and a 1925 one-story addition. The building is associated with Peoria's history through transportation; Peoria was once a major shipping point due to its vicinity to the Illinois River and major railroad connections. The structure was added to the National Register of Historic Places on November 15, 2005, after the National Register's 50 year cut off for inclusion had expired on the building's original period of significance (1914-1955).
