= Judge Jacob Gale House =

Historic house in Illinois, United States

- U.S. National Register of Historic Places
- City of Peoria Local Historic Landmark
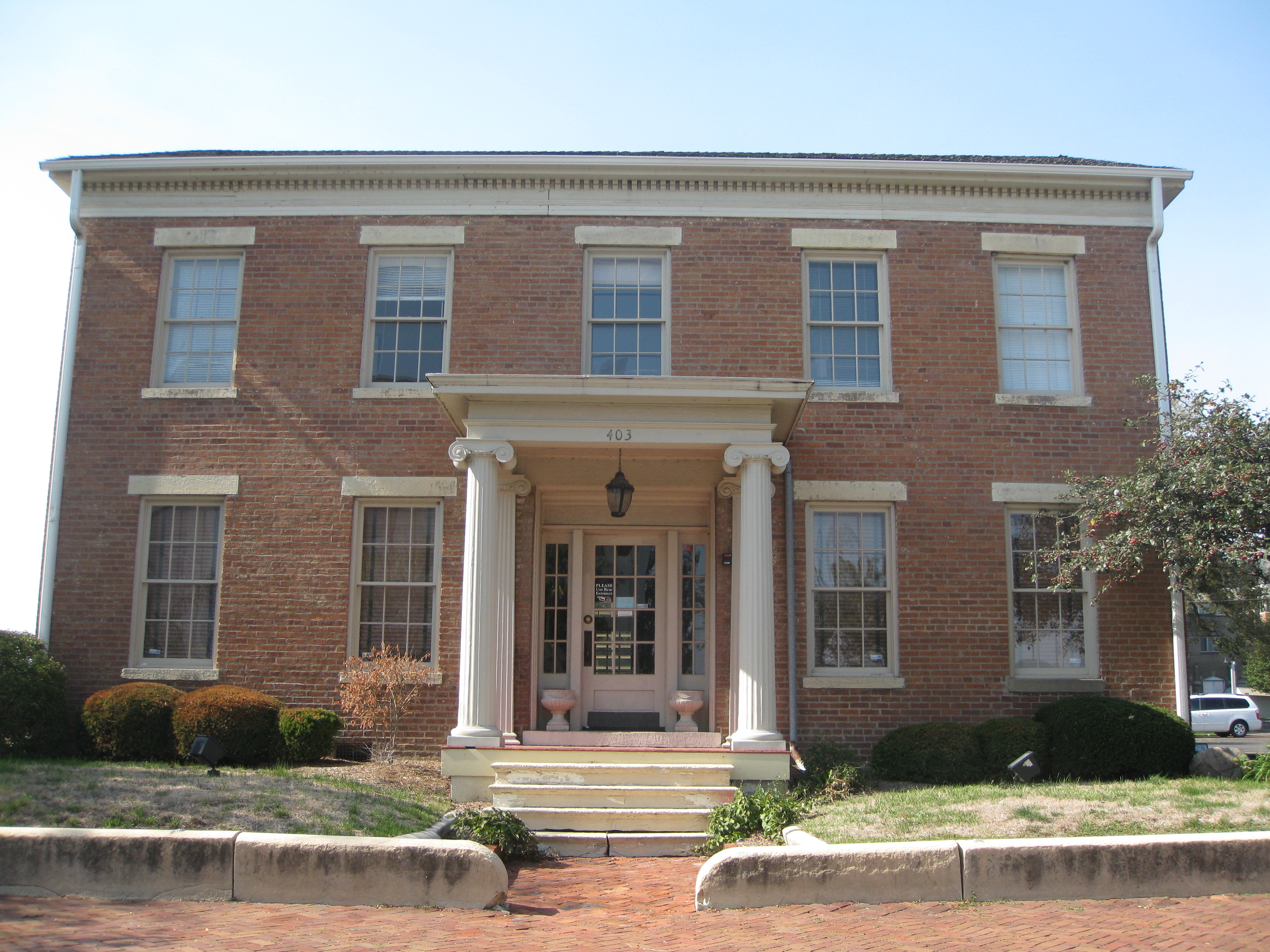

- Location within Illinois Location within the United States
- Location: 403 NE Jefferson St., Peoria, Illinois
- Coordinates: 40°41′43.9″N 89°35′12.3″W
- Area: 0.5 acres (0.20 ha)
- Built: c. 1839-40
- Architectural style: Greek Revival
- NRHP reference No.: 82002591
- Added to NRHP: March 19, 1982

The Judge Jacob Gale House is located at 403 N.E. Jefferson Ave., Peoria, Illinois, United States. The home was constructed for Judge Jacob Gale around 1839 or 1840. The Greek Revival house was built within the five years following the city's downtown being laid out and streets established. It was added to the National Register of Historic Places on March 19, 1982. The home is also listed as a contributing member to Peoria's North Side Historic District, which was added to the National Register in November 1983.

A different Judge Jacob Gale House, built around 1887 at what is now 1007 N. North St., is listed as a contributing property to Peoria's West Bluff Historic District, added to the National Register in 1976.
