= Knox County Jail =

- U.S. National Register of Historic Places
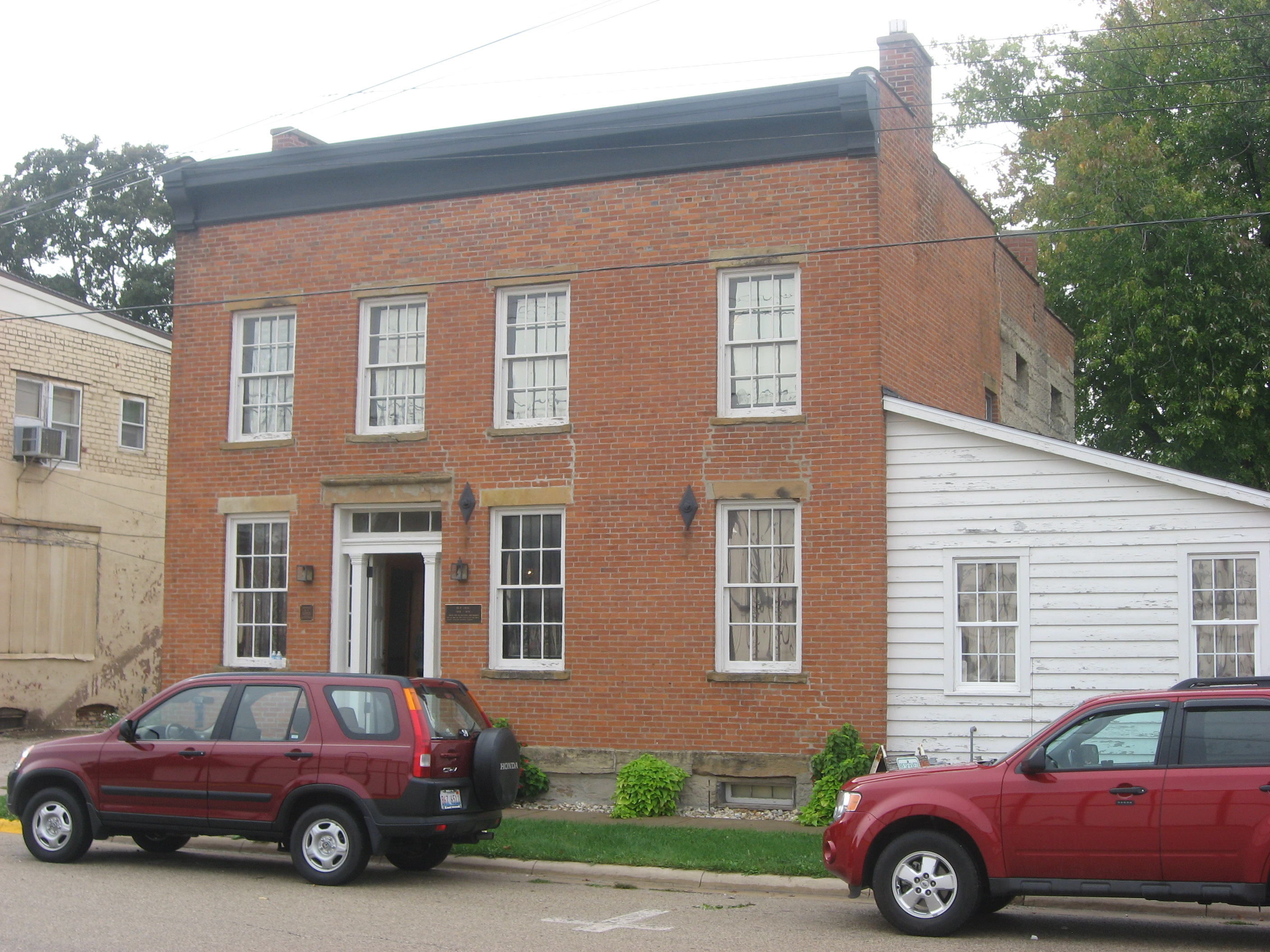

- Location within Illinois Location within the United States
- Location: Public Sq., Market St., Knoxville, Illinois
- Coordinates: 40°54′31″N 90°17′7″W
- Area: less than one acre
- Built: 1845
- Built by: Wheeler, Alvah
- NRHP reference No.: 92000050
- Added to NRHP: February 13, 1992

The Knox County Jail, located on the public square in Knoxville, is a former county jail used by Knox County, Illinois. Built in 1845, the jail was the second used in the county; it replaced a log jail which was thought to be insufficiently secure. Contractor Alvah Wheeler built the two-story brick building for $7,724. The county's only official hanging was conducted at the jail in 1873, when John M. Osborne was executed for the murder of Adelia Matthews; several hundred people came to watch his execution. Later in the same year, the county seat and the jail were both moved to Galesburg; the Knoxville jail is now part of the Knox County Museum.

The jail was added to the National Register of Historic Places on February 13, 1992.
