= Charles Ulricson =

Swedish-born American architect

Charles L. Ulricson (1816, Stockholm, Sweden – 1887, Peoria, Illinois) was a Swedish-born American architect, who practiced in Peoria, Illinois. He is best known for designing Old Main (1856–57) – the principal building at Knox College, Galesburg, Illinois – now a National Historic Landmark.

== Biography ==
The son of Carl Ulricson, architect to the Swedish crown, he graduated from the Royal Institute of Architects in Stockholm. Following his father's death, he emigrated to the United States in 1835, initially settling in New York City. He was employed by the architect Alexander Jackson Davis for about four years, where he worked on University Hall (1833–37, demolished 1890) for New York University. Searching for a place to set up his own practice, he traveled through the American South before settling in Peoria, Illinois, about 1844.

Ulricson established a successful practice in Peoria, designing and often acting as contractor for commercial buildings and residences. He designed and built St. Paul's Episcopal Church (1850, demolished 1880s), of which he was a member and later vestryman; and a private school, Peoria Academy (1854). He designed and built a number of Italianate and Second Empire mansions on Peoria's West Bluff, overlooking the city and the Illinois River.

=== Old Main ===
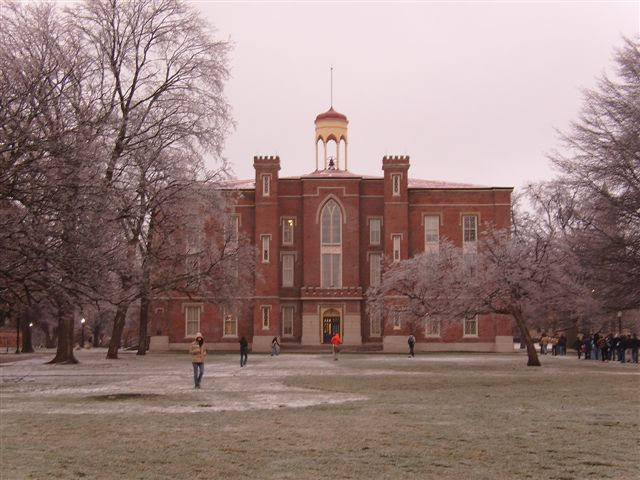
Old Main (1856-57), Knox College, Galesburg, Illinois.

His most prominent early commission was for buildings at Knox College. The Female Seminary (1856–57), the first education building and dormitory for women, made the college co-educational. Old Main, the centerpiece of the campus, contained men's classrooms and the college chapel. His Victorian Gothic design for Old Main was inspired by Hampton Court Palace, Henry VIII's residence outside London.

Notably, a year after its opening, Old Main was the site of the October 7, 1858 debate between incumbent Senator Stephen A. Douglas and challenger Congressman Abraham Lincoln. A crowd estimated at 15,000 people stood on the lawn for the 3-hour event, while the contenders spoke from a platform erected before the building. The primary subject of the Lincoln–Douglas debates was the expansion of slavery in the United States – Douglas argued in support and Lincoln opposed. Lincoln lost the 1858 Senatorial election, but two years later won the 1860 Presidential election. Old Main is the only surviving building from the debates.

In 2010, Knox College professor R. Lance Factor published a book about Ulricson and Old Main, arguing that the building is filled with iconography and associations with Freemasonry. Knox College was a Presbyterian institution, and its president during the period when Old Main was built, Reverend Jonathan Blanchard, was vehemently anti-Masonic. Dr. Factor argues that Ulricson kept his Masonic membership a secret.

== Personal ==
Ulricson married Maria Cowham in 1861. Four of their six children reached adulthood: Walter H. (b. 1867), Oscar E. (b. 1870), E. Frank (b. 1873), and Fanny M. (b. 1878). The family lived at 309 W. Armstrong Street, Peoria.

== Works ==
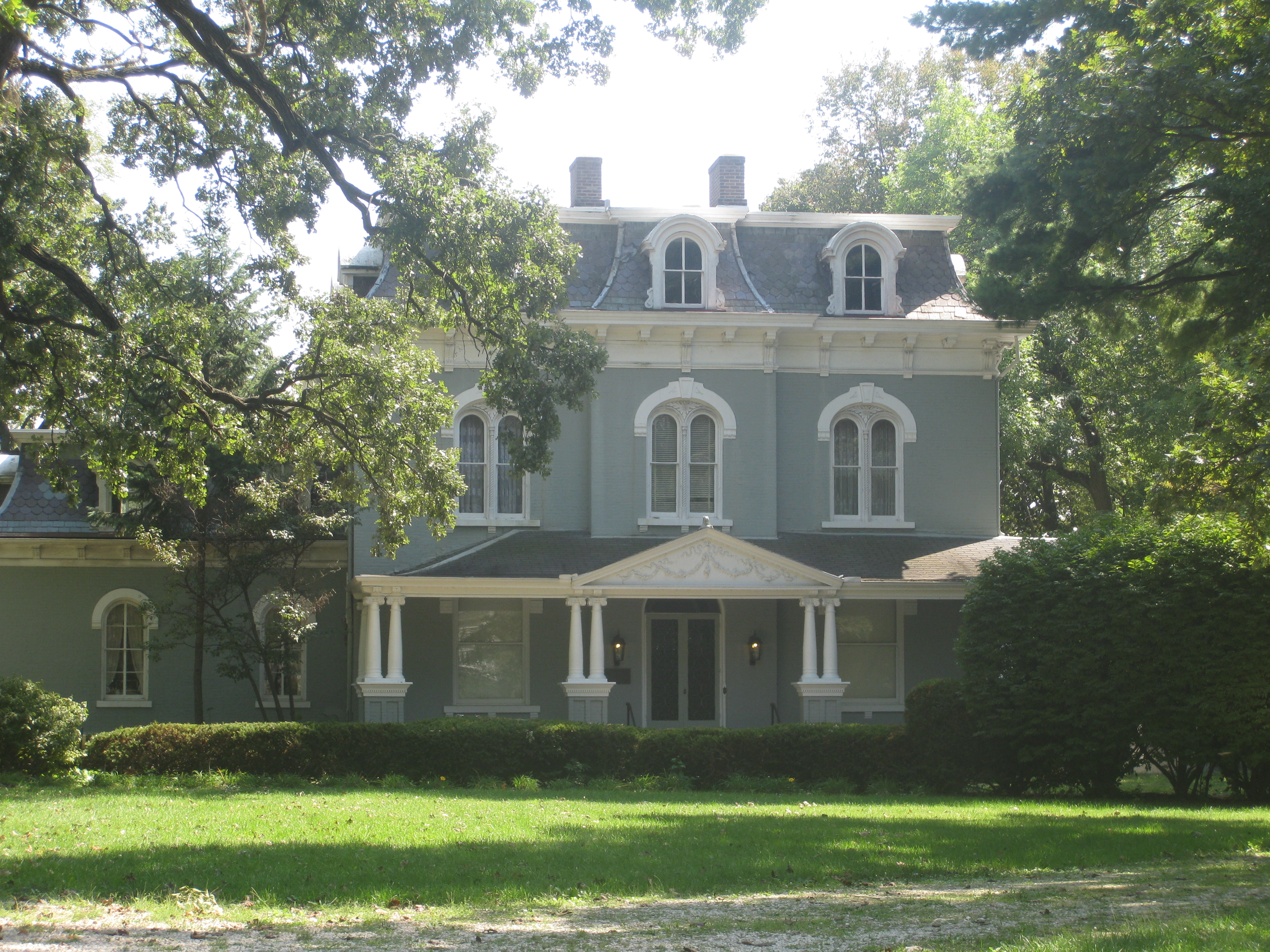
Pettengill-Morron House (1867), Peoria, Illinois.

- Buildings at Jubilee College (1845–47), Jubilee Township, Illinois.
- John Reynolds house (1847), 305 N. Jefferson Street, Peoria, Illinois.
- St. Paul's Episcopal Church (1850, demolished 1880s), Monroe & Main Streets, Peoria, Illinois.
- Peoria Academy (1854), Peoria, Illinois.
- Old Main (1856–57), Knox College, Galesburg, Illinois. NRHP-listed.
- Female Seminary (women's education building and dormitory) (1856–57), Knox College, Tompkins Street, Galesburg, Illinois. Later renamed "Whiting Hall," it was greatly expanded in the 1880s and 1890s. Now no longer part of the college, it is used as housing for the elderly.
- Peoria Marine & Fire Insurance Company (1859), Main Street, Peoria, Illinois.
- Mathew Griswold house (1859), West Bluff, 109 S. Madison Street, Peoria, Illinois.
- John L. Griswold house (1859), West Bluff, Moss Street, Peoria, Illinois.
- Reuben B. Hamlin house (1859), West Bluff, Peoria, Illinois.
- Augustana Lutheran Church (1865–67), 628 Sixth Street, Andover, Illinois. Dr. Factor identifies Masonic iconography also in this building.
- Pettengill-Morron House (1867), 1212 W. Moss Avenue, Peoria, Illinois. Part of West Bluff Historic District. NRHP-listed. Now operated as a historic house museum by the Peoria Historical Society.
- Peoria County Almshouse (1869–70), County Farm, Route 116. Designed to house 100 inmates.
- Bushnell High School (1876–77), Bushnell, Illinois, William Quaye, architect, Charles Ulrichson, contractor.
- Edward S. Easton house (1880), 1125 Main Street, Peoria, Illinois. Part of West Bluff Historic District. Now occupied by Converse Marketing.
- Stark County Courthouse Annex (1884), Toulon, Illinois.
- Hall of Records, Knoxville, Illinois.
