= Kickapoo Building =

- U.S. National Register of Historic Places
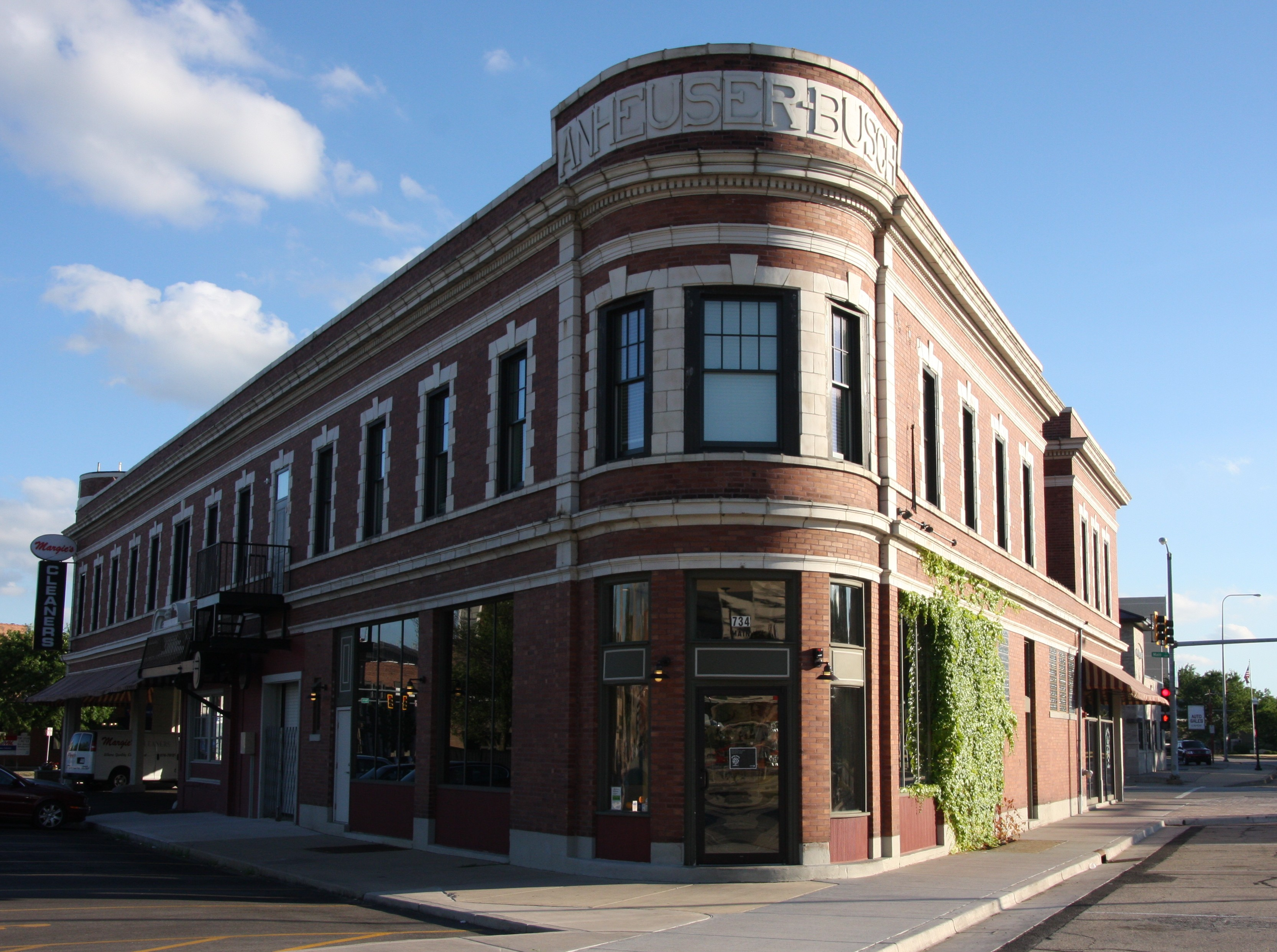
- The Kickapoo Building in 2016

- Location within Peoria County, Illinois Location within Illinois Location within the United States
- Location: 726 W. Main St., Peoria, Illinois
- Coordinates: 40°41′48″N 89°35′40″W
- Built: 1911
- Built by: John Hartwig
- Architect: Albert Keifer
- Architectural style: Classical Revival
- NRHP reference No.: 13001005
- Added to NRHP: December 31, 2013

The Kickapoo Building is a historic commercial building located at 726 West Main Street in Peoria, Illinois. Built in 1911, the building was originally used as a tied house for the Anheuser-Busch Brewery, which sought to expand its presence in Peoria's large brewing industry. The two-story building has a flatiron shape, a design which took advantage of its triangular lot. Architect Albert Keifer gave the building a Classical Revival design with German Renaissance Revival features.

Flatiron buildings were once commonly built in Peoria as a necessity of the city's geography; while downtown Peoria was built on a grid aligned with the Illinois River, its subsequent additions were usually aligned with the cardinal directions, and extensions of streets from the additions into downtown led to the creation of many triangular lots. The Kickapoo Building's lot was created by three of these streets, Main Street and Glendale Avenue from the original downtown and Knoxville from the boundaries of several later additions; while it was not the first building on its triangular lot, it was the first one to take full advantage of the space. Modern commercial development and freeway construction eliminated many of Peoria's diagonal streets downtown, including Knoxville Avenue itself, and took many of its flatiron buildings with it; the Kickapoo Building stands out among the survivors for its decorative commercial storefronts on all three sides.

The building was added to the National Register of Historic Places on December 31, 2013.
