= Walnut Grove Farm (Knoxville, Illinois) =

- U.S. National Register of Historic Places
- U.S. Historic district
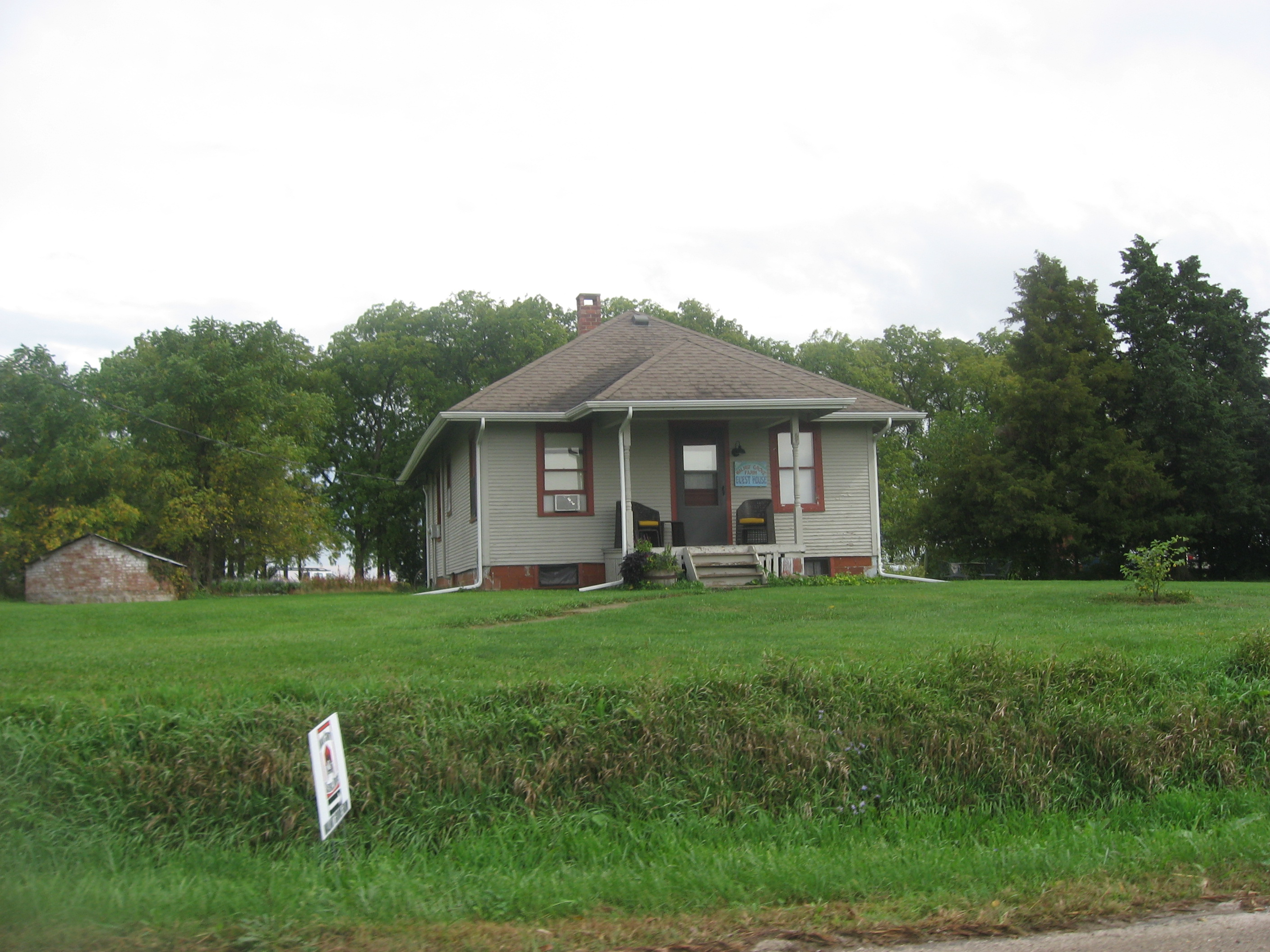
- Tenant house on the farm

- Location within Illinois Location within the United States
- Location: Knox Station Road, 1 mile (1.6 km) Knoxville, Illinois
- Coordinates: 40°55′11″N 90°16′7″W
- Area: 360 acres (150 ha)
- Architectural style: Second Empire, Bank barn
- NRHP reference No.: 89001114
- Added to NRHP: August 24, 1989

The Walnut Grove Farm is a farm complex and historic district located on Knox Station Road 1 mile (1.6 km) north of Knoxville, Illinois. George A. Charles, the son of one of Knoxville's founders, established the farm in 1835. Charles, his sons A.G. and A.P., and A.G.'s son George were all both successful farmers and prominent citizens of Knoxville. The farm focused on breeding cattle and growing corn, with an emphasis on the former; at its peak, the farm covered over 1,900 acres (770 ha), 360 acres (150 ha) of which are included in the historic district. The present farm complex includes a main house, a tenant farmer's house, a bank barn that was once among the largest in the state, three additional barns, a hog farrowing building, and a collection of outbuildings.

The farm was added to the National Register of Historic Places on August 24, 1989.
