= Francis W. Little House II =

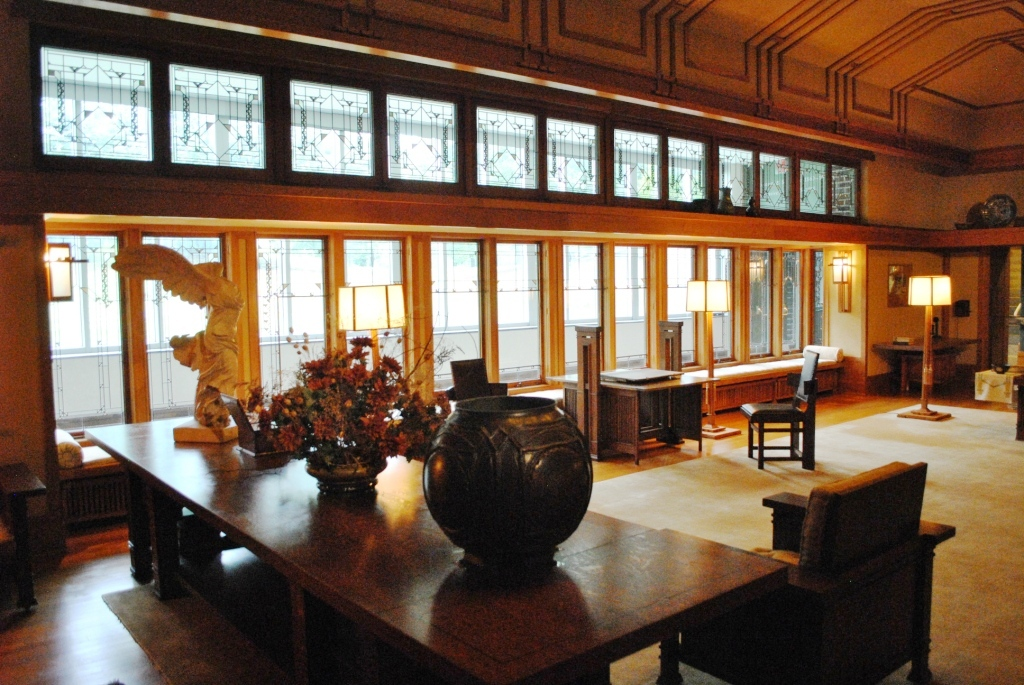
- The house's living room in the Metropolitan Museum of Art
- Interactive map of the Francis W. Little House II area

General information
- Architectural style: Prairie School
- Location: Deephaven, Minnesota
- Coordinates: 44°56′34″N 93°31′23″W
- Completed: 1912
- Demolished: 1972

Design and construction
- Architect: Frank Lloyd Wright

The Francis W. Little House II was a Prairie School house in Deephaven, Minnesota, which was designed by Frank Lloyd Wright for Francis W. and Mary Little. Built in 1912, it was the second house Wright designed for the Littles; the first was built in Peoria, Illinois in 1902. The Littles contacted Wright about the house in 1908, shortly after purchasing a vacation plot overlooking Lake Minnetonka; as Wright was occupied with a European tour and work on his own home, Taliesin, he did not design the Little House until four years later. The two-story house's design was typical of Wright's Prairie School works, featuring a low profile with multiple connected pavilions meant to blend in with the surrounding landscape. Along with Taliesin, it was one of Wright's last Prairie School designs before he began to explore other styles.

The house faced demolition after being put up for sale in 1972. Morrison Heckscher of the Metropolitan Museum of Art in New York City intervened to preserve the house, and the Met purchased and dismantled the building; while much of the house is still in the museum's possession, parts have been sold to other museums. The house's living room is on display in the Met Fifth Avenue's American Wing. The house's library is exhibited in the Allentown Art Museum, while one of its bedroom hallways is part of an exhibit at the Minneapolis Institute of Art; other elements of the house, such as windows, have been sold to additional museums.

== See also ==
- List of Frank Lloyd Wright works
