= Springdale Cemetery =

- U.S. National Register of Historic Places
- U.S. Historic district
- City of Peoria Local Historic Landmark
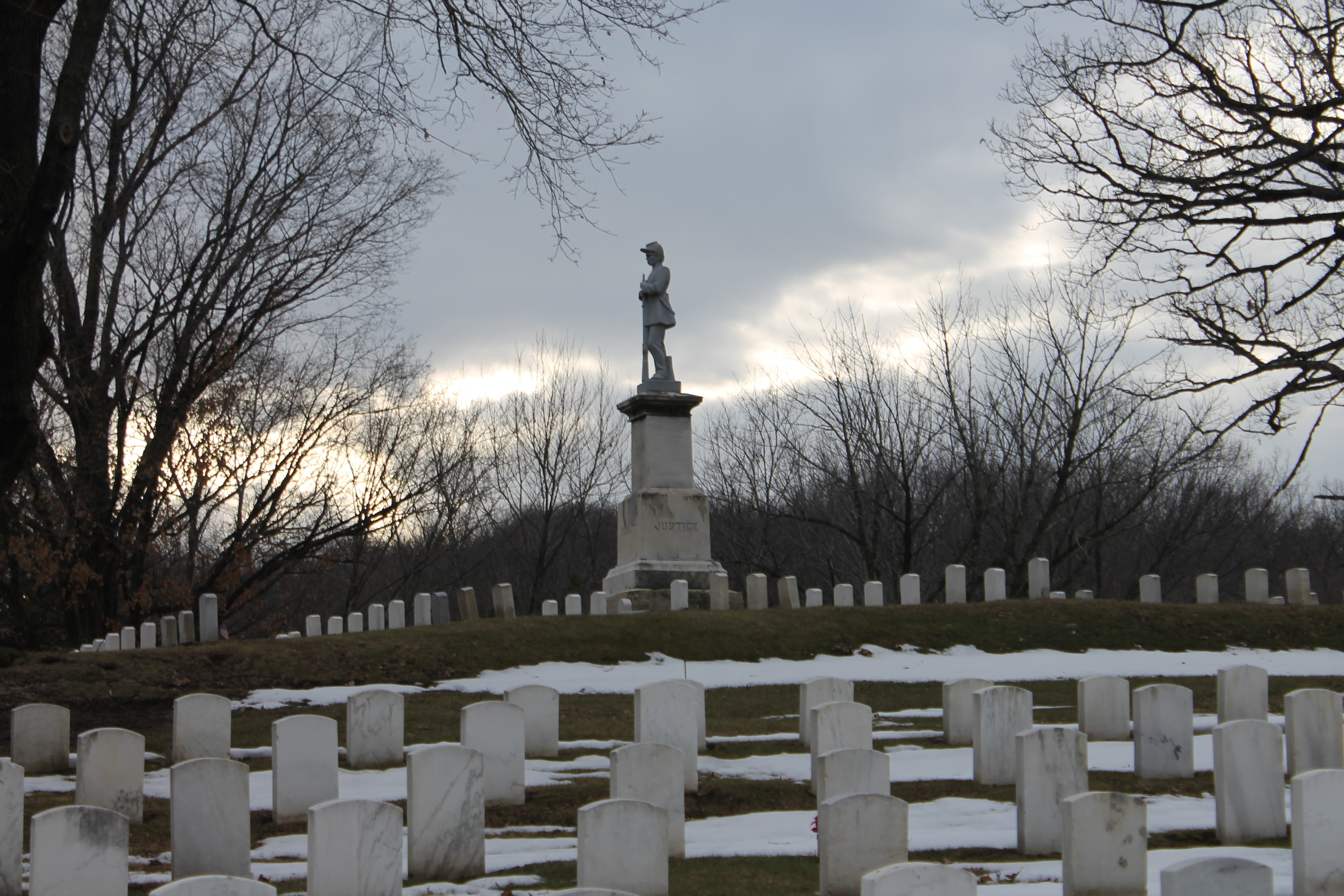

- Location within Peoria County, Illinois
- Location: 3014 N. Prospect Rd., Peoria, Illinois
- Coordinates: 40.723°N 89.569°W
- Area: 223 acres (0.90 km^{2})
- Built: pre-1887
- Architects: Triebel & Sons (monuments/mausoleums); Unknown (landscape)
- Architectural style: American Craftsman
- NRHP reference No.: 04001303
- Added to NRHP: December 10, 2004

Springdale Cemetery is a historic, non-sectarian, active cemetery in the United States city of Peoria, Illinois. It was chartered in 1855, received its first interment in 1857. Almost 78,000 individuals are buried at the cemetery. It contains a public mausoleum and 15 private mausoleums.

The property was acquired in 1854, and the first interment took place in April 1857. The Cemetery is an active, non-sectarian burial ground, and the property contains 15 private mausoleums. The historic gatehouse, constructed in 1901, was razed in 2010. The public mausoleum, which was designed by the Chicago architectural firm of Lovell & Lovell, was completed in 1929 and has been expanded twice. The cemetery once grew to over 360 acres (1.46 km^{2}) but has since retracted to its present size of 223 acres (90 ha). The property includes six and a half miles of winding driveways. The cemetery is the final resting place for nearly 78,000 individuals from the Peoria area. The property is not fully developed, and as a result, the Cemetery can accommodate another 50,000 burials. The Cemetery permits traditional burial in the ground, entombment in the mausoleum, inurnment of cremated remains in crypts and in burial lots, and a scattering garden. The Cemetery is actively planning for green burial.

== History ==
Interment in the cemetery began in April 1857 after the Illinois State Legislature granted the managers the authority to accept pre-payment for interment services and trust funds for perpetual care. The cemetery remained in private ownership until 1999 at which time Illinois Comptroller Dan Hynes seized control the property due to improper management and neglected maintenance. A receiver was appointed to act on behalf of the Comptroller, and in September 2002, the publicly appointed Springdale Cemetery Management Authority was established to manage the Cemetery following the signing of an intergovernmental agreement between the City of Peoria (the property owner), the County of Peoria, the Peoria Park District, and the Springdale Historic Preservation Foundation, a 501(c)(3) organization.

Springdale Cemetery was listed on the National Register of Historic Places as a historic district December 10, 2004. The district contains 53 properties, just three of which are classified as non-contributing members to the historic district. The contributing properties within the district include 3 buildings, one site, 17 structures and 29 objects. Springdale Cemetery is also a Local Historic Landmark as of June 1999.

Locally, Springdale is said to be haunted by several apparitions, the most prominent one is that of Mildred Hallmark. on June 16th, 1935, Hallmark rode a street car to her home, but was later found underneath a tree in Springdale Cemetery. Having been sexually assaulted and subsequently murdered, the police were lead to 25 year old Gerald Thompson. He is documented as Peoria's first serial rapist, having assaulted at least 16 women before he was convicted on July 31st, 1935 and was executed via electric chair on October 15th, 1935.

== Notable interments ==
Individuals who were prominent in the establishment of Peoria as well as common men and women who made the city their home are interred in the cemetery. Some notable individuals:

- Octave Chanute, the father of American aviation
- Lucie (Brotherson) Tyng, founder of the Women's Christian Temperance Union
- Lydia (Moss) Bradley, founder of Bradley Polytechnic Institute (now Bradley University)
- Thomas Ford, Illinois Governor (1842–1846)
- Hedley Waycott, American artist
- Anastase Robin, a member of Napoleon's Imperial Guard

=== Veterans ===
Approximately 900 military veterans lie buried on the grounds (including Frank Wilbur "Spig" Wead, a U.S. Navy aviator who helped promote United States Naval aviation from its inception) in both a designated Soldiers' Hill (established in 1862) as well as in private lots.

==== Soldier's Hill ====
Soldier's Hill was established by the Ladies Memorial Association. Four cannons mark each of the four corners, which were procured from the Rock Island Arsenal on June 10, 1874.
