= Francis W. Little House I =

House in Peoria, Illinois

- U.S. Historic district – Contributing property
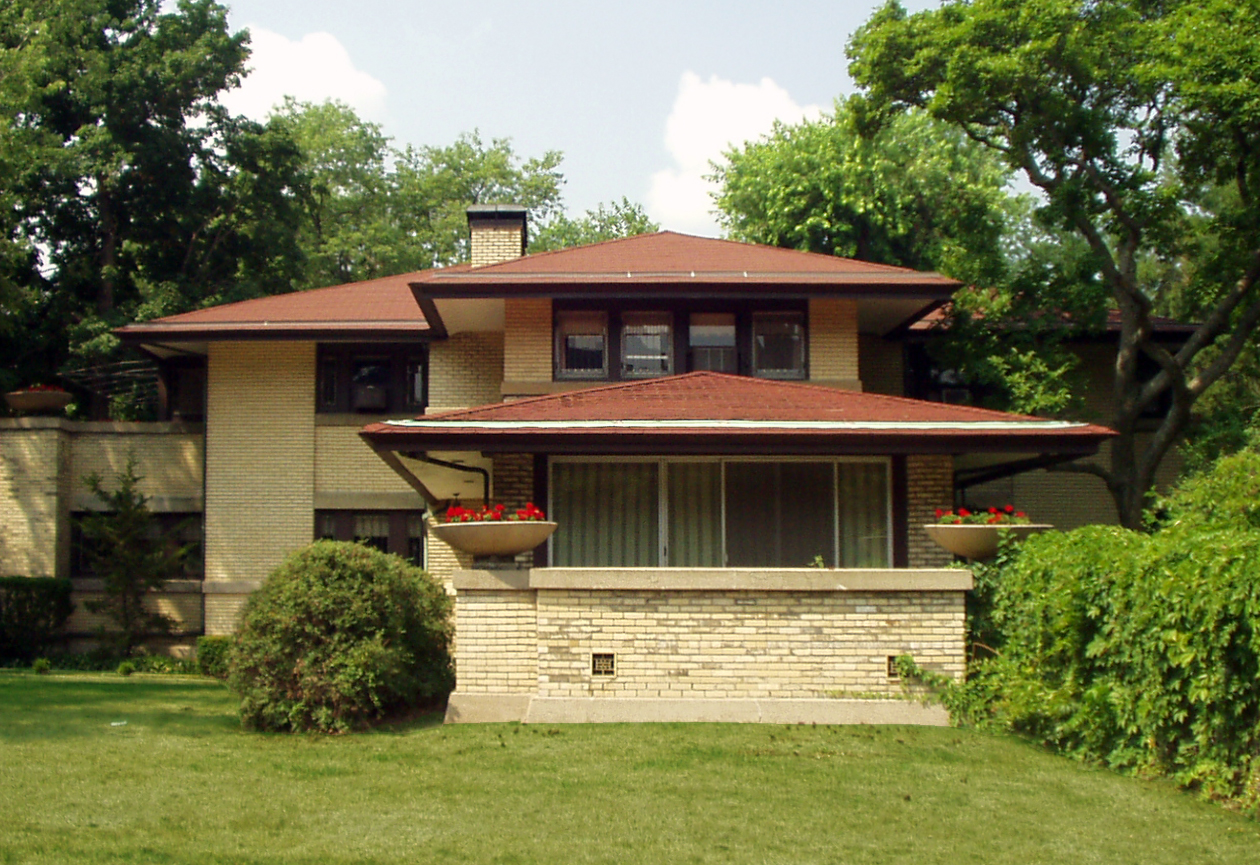

- Location within Illinois Location within the United States
- Location: 1505 W. Moss Ave., Peoria, Illinois
- Coordinates: 40°41′36″N 89°36′58″W
- Built: 1903
- Architect: Frank Lloyd Wright
- Architectural style: Prairie School
- Part of: West Bluff Historic District (ID76000725)
- Designated CP: December 17, 1976

The Francis W. Little House I is a house in Peoria, Illinois, which was designed by Frank Lloyd Wright for Francis W. and Mary Little. Wright designed the Prairie School house in 1902, and it was completed in 1903. The house has a low profile with overhanging eaves along the roof, rows of ribbon windows, and patterned glass features built into the interior fixtures; its design is similar to Wright's other Prairie School works of the period. Francis W. Little was an executive at the Peoria Gas and Electric Company at the time, and both Littles were original members of the Art Institute of Chicago; Wright later designed a second house for the couple in Minnesota.

The Littles only lived in the house for a year, and Robert D. and Cora G. Clarke moved into the house in 1904. The Clarkes hired Wright to redesign the property's stable, which still stands behind the house.

The house is part of the West Bluff Historic District, which is listed on the National Register of Historic Places.

== See also ==
- List of Frank Lloyd Wright works
