= Peoria Mineral Springs =

Historic spring and 19th-century landmark in Peoria, Illinois

- U.S. National Register of Historic Places
- Peoria Local Historic Landmark
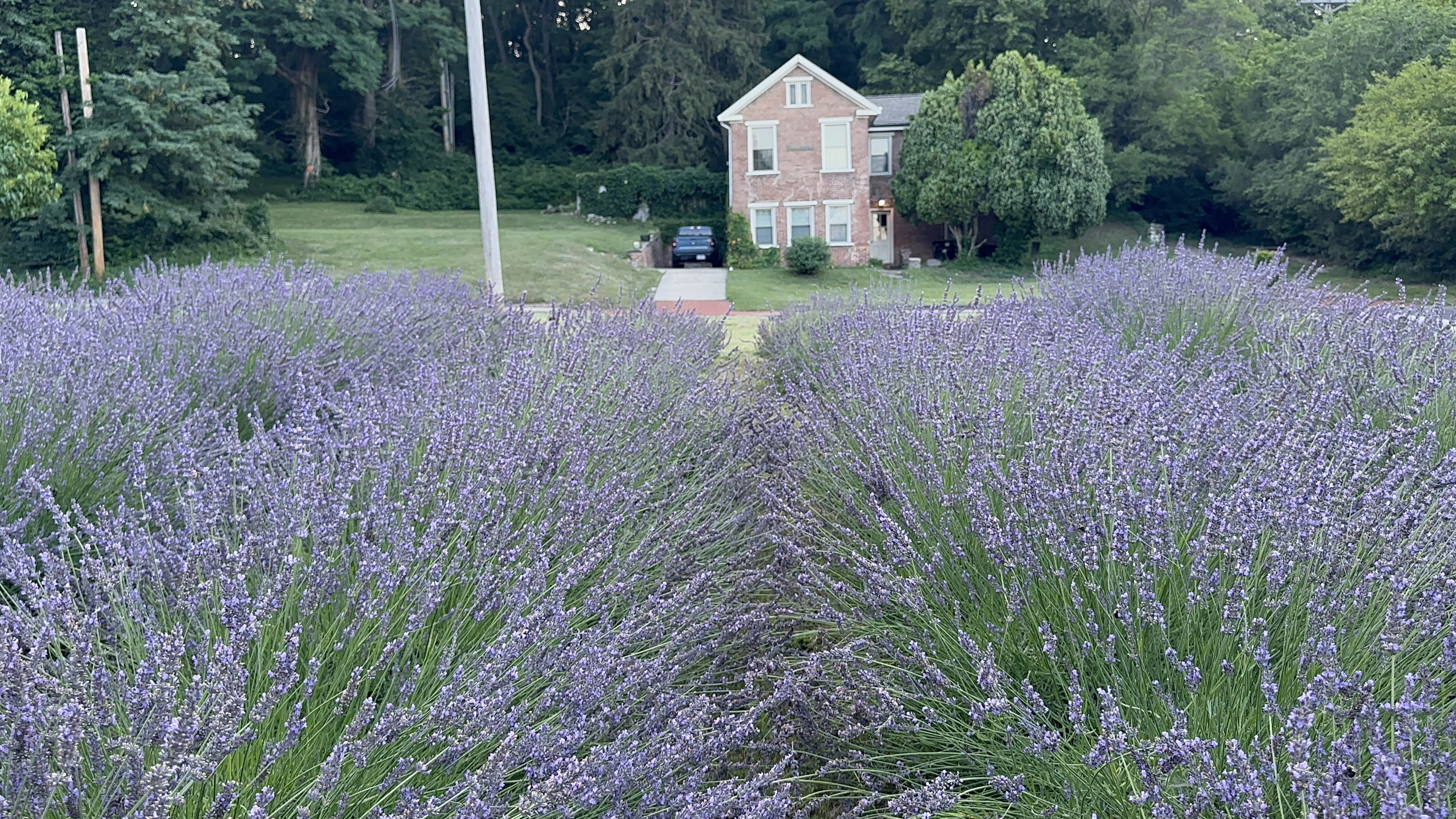
- The historic William S. Moss house with lavender fields at Peoria Mineral Springs, Peoria, Illinois

- Location within Illinois Location within the United States
- Location: 701 W. 7th Ave., Peoria, Illinois
- Coordinates: 40°41′45″N 89°36′15″W
- Area: less than one acre
- Built: 1843 (site's spring estimated to be 14,500+ years old)
- Architect: Unknown
- Architectural style: Federal
- Website: peoriamineralsprings.com
- NRHP reference No.: 82002593

Significant dates
- Added to NRHP: March 5, 1982
- Designated PLHL: 1994

Peoria Mineral Springs is a naturally flowing mineral spring and historic landmark located on the West Bluff of Peoria, Illinois, United States. Also known as Spring Hill, the spring is estimated to be over 14,500 years old and sits on the West Bluff between Martin Luther King Jr. Drive and Moss Avenue. The property is privately owned and not open to the public.

== History ==
In 1818, a federal land grant was issued to Augustus O. Garrett, a veteran of the War of 1812. This tract would later become the site of Peoria Mineral Springs. In 1840, it was deeded to riverboat captain and entrepreneur William S. Moss, who would later build the Federal-style brick house in 1843 that still stands on the property.

The spring is a remnant of glacial retreat during the last Ice Age. It produces mineral water with a pH of 7.3 and contains over 900 parts per million of dissolved minerals. Flowing at approximately 30,000 gallons per day, the spring historically fed Goose Lake, a natural body of water that was drained in the 1800s.

The site was used by Indigenous peoples for generations Archaeological evidence, including tools and pottery fragments, indicates a longstanding Indigenous presence. Across many Native traditions, mineral springs were considered sacred, natural places of healing, ceremony, and renewal.

In 1834, a brick barrel-vaulted reservoir was constructed into the hillside to collect the spring water. Known as the Peoria Water Works, this early municipal system distributed water via wooden pipes as far as two miles away.

Water from the spring was piped to the home of philanthropist Lydia Moss Bradley until her death in 1908.

By the late 19th century, commercial bottling began. Ransom Hickey of Hickey Bottling Works was one of the first to bottle water directly from the spring, operating from the brick house on the property. In 1892, Lydia Moss Bradley sold the site to Preston Clark, who trademarked the name “Peoria Mineral Springs” and opened a bottling plant across the street. He sold a variety of beverages including mineral water, rose malt, peach cider, and seltzer, marketed as "wholesome and invigorating." The plant remained in operation into the early 20th century before being demolished in 1971.

== Renovation ==
In 1969, the Traynor family purchased the property to save it from demolition and restore the historic residence. The spring had been filled in for safety reasons and required more than two years of excavation to reopen its original flow.

Peoria Mineral Springs was added to the National Register of Historic Places on March 5, 1982. In 1994, the City of Peoria designated the spring and home as a Historic Local Landmark.

In 2010, Tobias T. Traynor, son of Charles Traynor Jr., acquired the spring and residence. Small-scale bottling operations were reintroduced, with water offered in 5-gallon BPA-free containers and 1-liter bottles. The water is processed using carbon filtration and ultraviolet sterilization prior to bottling.

A lavender field located downslope from the spring blooms seasonally and was introduced in the 21st century. The field is maintained as part of the property, and bundles are occasionally offered.
