= Logan Township, Peoria County, Illinois =

Coordinates: 40°40′04″N 89°48′59″W

Logan Township
- Township
- Location in Peoria County

- Peoria County's location in Illinois
- Country: United States
- State: Illinois
- County: Peoria
- Established: November 6, 1849

Area
  - Total: 36.62 sq mi (94.8 km^{2})
  - Land: 36.59 sq mi (94.8 km^{2})
  - Water: 0.03 sq mi (0.078 km^{2}) 0.08%

Population (2010)
  - Estimate (2016): 3,175
  - Density: 87.2/sq mi (33.7/km^{2})
- Time zone: UTC-6 (CST)
  - Summer (DST): UTC-5 (CDT)
- FIPS code: 17-143-44342

Logan Township is located in Peoria County, Illinois. As of the 2010 census, its population was 3,192 and it contained 1,390 housing units. It contains the census-designated place of Smithville.

== Geography ==
According to the 2010 census, the township has a total area of 36.62 square miles (94.8 km^{2}), of which 36.59 square miles (94.8 km^{2}) (or 99.92%) is land and 0.03 square miles (0.078 km^{2}) (or 0.08%) is water.

== Demographics ==
Historical population
| Census | Pop. | Note | %± |
|---|---|---|---|
| 2016 (est.) | 3,175 |
U.S. Decennial Census
