= Norwood, Illinois =

Norwood
- Village
- Location of Norwood in Peoria County, Illinois.
- Coordinates: 40°42′28″N 89°41′58″W
- Country: United States
- State: Illinois
- County: Peoria

Area
  - Total: 0.31 sq mi (0.79 km^{2})
  - Land: 0.31 sq mi (0.79 km^{2})
  - Water: 0 sq mi (0.00 km^{2})
- Elevation: 682 ft (208 m)

Population (2020)
  - Total: 437
  - Density: 1,424.6/sq mi (550.03/km^{2})
- Time zone: UTC-6 (CST)
  - Summer (DST): UTC-5 (CDT)
- Area code: 309
- FIPS code: 17-54404
- GNIS feature ID: 2399530
- Website: villageofnorwoodil.com

Norwood is a village in Peoria County, Illinois, United States. As of the 2020 census, Norwood had a population of 437. Norwood, just outside Peoria, is part of the Peoria, Illinois Metropolitan Statistical Area.

== Geography ==
According to the 2010 census, Norwood has a total area of 0.29 square miles (0.75 km^{2}), all land.

== Demographics ==
Historical population
Census	Pop.	Note	%±
1960	626		—
1970	632		1.0%
1980	612		−3.2%
1990	495		−19.1%
2000	473		−4.4%
2010	478		1.1%
2020	437		−8.6%
U.S. Decennial Census

As of the census of 2000, there were 473 people, 176 households, and 140 families residing in the village. The population density was 1,788.9 inhabitants per square mile (690.7/km^{2}). There were 182 housing units at an average density of 688.3 per square mile (265.8/km^{2}). The racial makeup of the village was 99.15% White, 0.21% Native American, 0.21% Asian, and 0.42% from two or more races. Hispanic or Latino of any race were 0.42% of the population.

There were 176 households, out of which 26.7% had children under the age of 18 living with them, 67.0% were married couples living together, 9.1% had a female householder with no husband present, and 19.9% were non-families. 18.2% of all households were made up of individuals, and 9.1% had someone living alone who was 65 years of age or older. The average household size was 2.69 and the average family size was 3.01.

In the village, the population was spread out, with 24.3% under the age of 18, 6.8% from 18 to 24, 27.5% from 25 to 44, 25.8% from 45 to 64, and 15.6% who were 65 years of age or older. The median age was 40 years. For every 100 females, there were 91.5 males. For every 100 females age 18 and over, there were 93.5 males.

The median income for a household in the village was $40,156, and the median income for a family was $44,688. Males had a median income of $35,750 versus $20,893 for females. The per capita income for the village was $16,089. About 3.7% of families and 7.5% of the population were below the poverty line, including 15.1% of those under age 18 and none of those age 65 or over.

== Government and infrastructure ==
The village police department was formed in 1956. As of July 2016, the village had begun contracting through the Peoria County Sheriff's Office for police services.

== Education ==
It is in Norwood Elementary School District 63 and Limestone Community High School District 310.
