= Peoria Warehouse Historic District =

- U.S. National Register of Historic Places
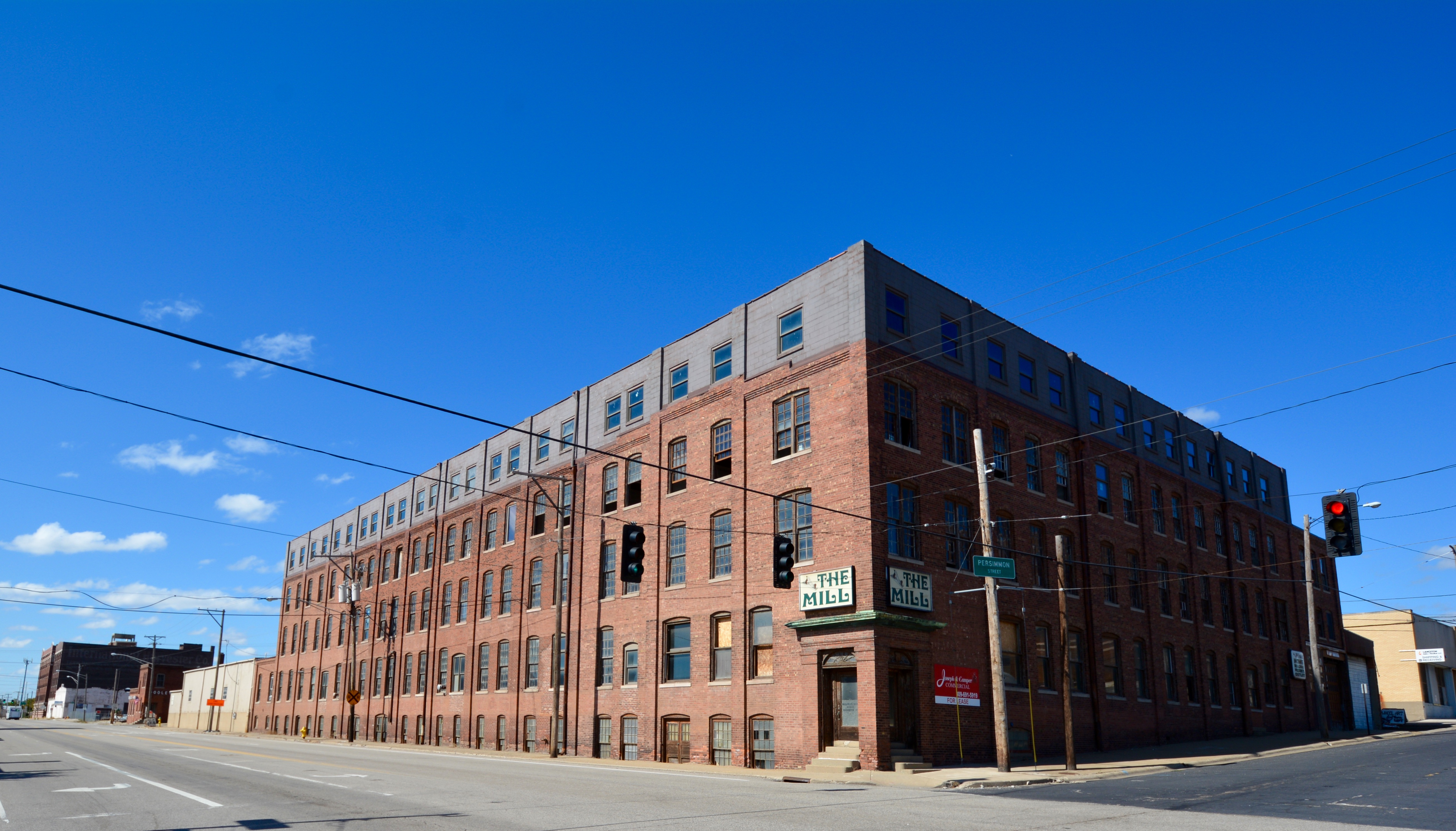
- The Mill was constructed in 1891 and was the home of the Wahlfeld's manufacturing company. The building now houses artists' studios.

- Location within Illinois Location within the United States
- Location: Roughly along Adams, May, Oak, Persimmon, State, Walnut & Washington Sts., Peoria, Illinois
- Coordinates: 40°41′08″N 89°35′52″W
- NRHP reference No.: 14000621
- Added to NRHP: September 17, 2014

The Peoria Warehouse Historic District is a historic industrial district located to the southwest of downtown Peoria, Illinois. The district includes 68 buildings, 59 of which are considered contributing to its historic status; these buildings include warehouses and other industrial structures and were built from the 1880s through the 1920s. The buildings generally have utilitarian designs inspired by the Chicago school and are built with reinforced concrete frames and brick exteriors.

The district was added to the National Register of Historic Places on September 17, 2014.

== History ==
Peoria became a significant industrial and shipping center in the late 19th century, and development boomed in the district due to its access to the Illinois River and the city's numerous rail lines. The industries present in the district reflected the city's economy as a whole and included brewing and distillery, the manufacture of farm implements, and iron and steel production.

== Revitalization ==
In the 21st century, the warehouse district has undergone a revitalization, with some of the buildings being repurposed for residential, retail, and small business use. This work has been encouraged by the city government and by the private Downtown Development Corporation of Peoria. It has been financed in part by the creation of a tax increment financing district.

Rhodell Brewery is a craft brewery and taproom that opened in 1998, a harbinger of both the warehouse district revitalization and the craft beer boom. In 2015 the brewery moved several blocks from its original location on Water Street to a new, larger location in the Murray Building on Walnut Street. In addition to selling its own beer on premise (including cask conditioned ale), Rhodell has a "brew on premise" program where amateur brewers can make their own beer using the brewery's equipment.

Bearded Owl Brewing was a craft brewery and taproom on State Street. It opened for business in 2018 and closed in December 2023.

Other dining and drinking destinations that have opened in rehabilitated buildings in the warehouse district include the Thyme Kitchen + Craft Beer restaurant and the Zion Coffee Bar.
