= Hanna City, Illinois =

Hanna City
- Village
- Location of Hanna City in Peoria County, Illinois.
- Coordinates: 40°41′35″N 89°48′18″W
- Country: United States
- State: Illinois
- County: Peoria

Area
  - Total: 1.28 sq mi (3.32 km^{2})
  - Land: 1.28 sq mi (3.32 km^{2})
  - Water: 0 sq mi (0.00 km^{2})
- Elevation: 712 ft (217 m)

Population (2020)
  - Total: 1,253
  - Density: 978.1/sq mi (377.63/km^{2})
- Time zone: UTC-6 (CST)
  - Summer (DST): UTC-5 (CDT)
- ZIP code: 61536
- Area code: 309
- FIPS code: 17-32668
- GNIS feature ID: 2398240
- Website: hannacityil.com

Hanna City is a village in Peoria County, Illinois, United States. As of the 2020 census, Hanna City had a population of 1,253. Hanna City is part of the Peoria Metropolitan Statistical Area.

== History ==
Hanna City was founded in 1882 and named after William Hanna (born 1827), who was president of the Peoria-Farmington Railroad, which ran through Hanna City. While originally a farming community, coal was soon discovered under the town. The coal mine was a major factor in the early years of the town and kept it thriving for more than half a century.

== Geography ==
According to the 2010 census, Hanna City has a total area of 0.48 square miles (1.24 km^{2}), all land.

== Demographics ==
Historical population
Census	Pop.	Note	%±
1920	975		—
1930	563		−42.3%
1940	633		12.4%
1950	671		6.0%
1960	1,056		57.4%
1970	1,282		21.4%
1980	1,361		6.2%
1990	1,205		−11.5%
2000	1,013		−15.9%
2010	1,225		20.9%
2020	1,253		2.3%
U.S. Decennial Census

=== 2020 census ===
As of the 2020 census, Hanna City had a population of 1,253. The median age was 41.1 years. 21.9% of residents were under the age of 18 and 22.7% of residents were 65 years of age or older. For every 100 females there were 94.3 males, and for every 100 females age 18 and over there were 91.4 males age 18 and over.

0.0% of residents lived in urban areas, while 100.0% lived in rural areas.

There were 568 households in Hanna City, of which 24.8% had children under the age of 18 living in them. Of all households, 46.8% were married-couple households, 17.6% were households with a male householder and no spouse or partner present, and 28.3% were households with a female householder and no spouse or partner present. About 36.0% of all households were made up of individuals and 19.9% had someone living alone who was 65 years of age or older.

There were 616 housing units, of which 7.8% were vacant. The homeowner vacancy rate was 0.9% and the rental vacancy rate was 10.0%.

Racial composition as of the 2020 census
Race	Number	Percent
White	1,180	94.2%
Black or African American	8	0.6%
American Indian and Alaska Native	3	0.2%
Asian	3	0.2%
Native Hawaiian and Other Pacific Islander	0	0.0%
Some other race	3	0.2%
Two or more races	56	4.5%
Hispanic or Latino (of any race)	37	3.0%

=== 2000 census ===
As of the 2000 census there were 1,013 people, 398 households, and 300 families residing in the village. The population density was 2,123.8 inhabitants per square mile (820.0/km^{2}). There were 437 housing units at an average density of 916.2 per square mile (353.7/km^{2}). The racial makeup of the village was 97.24% White, 0.39% African American, 0.20% Native American, 1.18% Asian, 0.69% from other races, and 0.30% from two or more races. Hispanic or Latino of any race were 1.09% of the population.

There were 398 households, out of which 32.9% had children under the age of 18 living with them, 64.1% were married couples living together, 8.3% had a female householder with no husband present, and 24.4% were non-families. 21.1% of all households were made up of individuals, and 10.1% had someone living alone who was 65 years of age or older. The average household size was 2.51 and the average family size was 2.90.

In the village, the population was spread out, with 25.8% under the age of 18, 6.9% from 18 to 24, 29.4% from 25 to 44, 22.5% from 45 to 64, and 15.4% who were 65 years of age or older. The median age was 37 years. For every 100 females, there were 96.7 males. For every 100 females age 18 and over, there were 91.8 males.

The median income for a household in the village was $42,639, and the median income for a family was $50,938. Males had a median income of $36,438 versus $26,397 for females. The per capita income for the village was $20,710. About 7.6% of families and 7.2% of the population were below the poverty line, including 12.1% of those under age 18 and 11.4% of those age 65 or over.

== Education ==
The school district is Farmington Central Community Unit School District 265.
