= West Bluff Historic District =

Historic district in Illinois, United States

- U.S. National Register of Historic Places
- U.S. Historic district
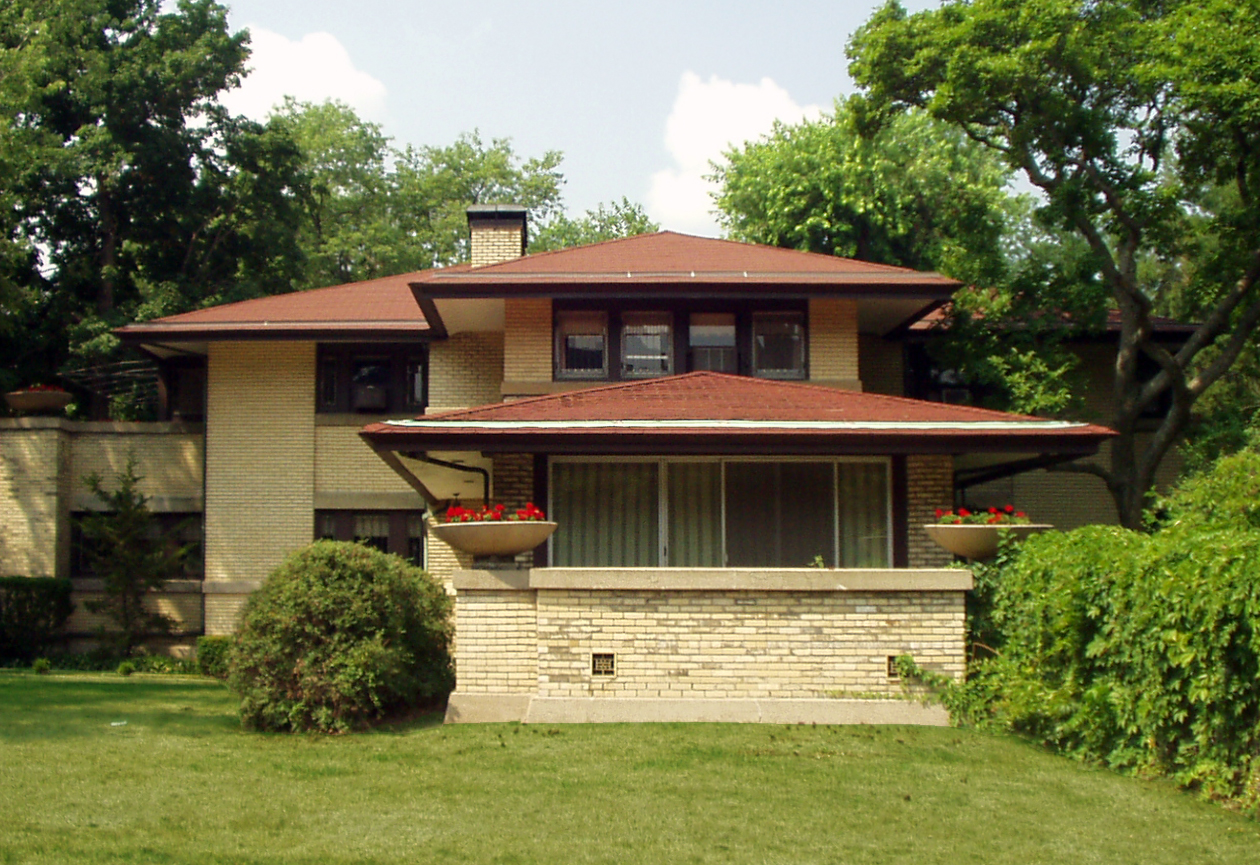
- Francis W. Little House, a contributing property on the West Bluff

- Location within Peoria County, Illinois Location within Illinois
- Location: Randolph, High and Moss Sts., E of Western St., Peoria, Illinois
- Coordinates: 40°41′25″N 89°37′17″W
- Area: 365 acres (148 ha)
- Architect: Frank Lloyd Wright, Various
- Architectural style: Italianate, Second Empire, Queen Anne, Prairie style, Classical Revival
- NRHP reference No.: 76000725
- Added to NRHP: December 17, 1976

The West Bluff Historic District is one of three Registered Historic Districts in the Peoria County, Illinois, city of Peoria. The district is mostly residential and is an example of the opulence once enjoyed by the upper class in the United States during the late 19th and early 20th centuries. Of particular note are two contributing structures designed by Frank Lloyd Wright: Francis W. Little House at 1505 W. Moss Ave., and the house at 1316 W. Moss Ave. Other NRHP properties also listed as contributing to this district include the Judge Jacob Gale House at 1007 N. North St. and Pettingill-Morron House at 1212 W. Moss Ave. The district was added to the National Register of Historic Places on December 17, 1976.

The West Bluff was largely overlooked in Peoria's development until the 1840s, when prominent families began purchasing property in the area for farming and distilling. Among them was Tobias Bradley, who married Lydia Moss, the founder of Bradley University, which today anchors the western edge of the district. The area's period of greatest development spanned from 1875 to 1924, during which wealthy residents built the mansions and stately residences that define the district today. The NRHP nomination identifies Charles E. Duryea, a pioneer of the American automotive industry, as a historically significant resident, having lived on Barker Avenue within the district during the 1890s. Today the district encompasses several sub-neighborhoods including the Arbor, Cottage, and Orchard Districts, as well as Bradley Park.

== Boundaries ==
The district boundaries are roughly defined by Randolph, Moss and High Streets, an area west of Western Avenue. In addition, some of the adjacent streets are included in the historic district.
