= CEFCU Arena =

Arena in Illinois, United States

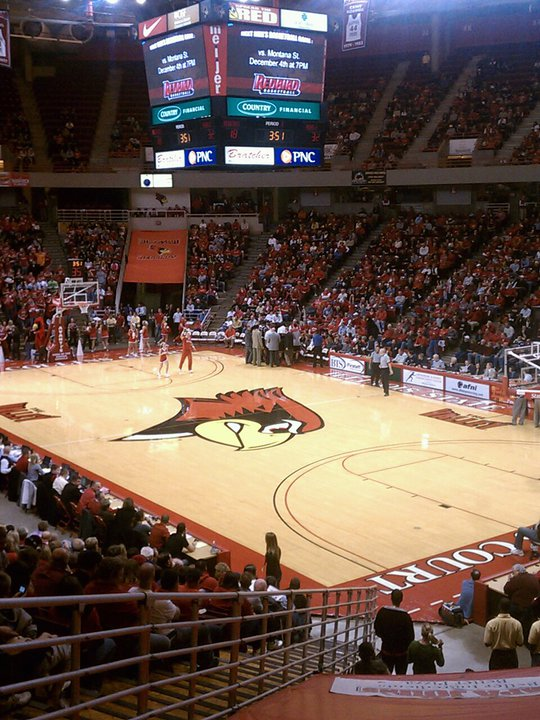
- Interactive map of CEFCU Arena
- Former names: Redbird Arena
- Location: 232 West College Avenue; Normal, IL 61761
- Coordinates: 40°30′38.18″N 88°59′56.44″W
- Owner: Illinois State University
- Operator: Illinois State University
- Capacity: 10,200
- Surface: Hardwood
- Public transit: Connect Transit

Construction
- Groundbreaking: May 8, 1986
- Opened: January 11, 1989
- Cost: $17.4 million ($45.2 million in 2025 dollars)
- Architect: CRS Sirrine Inc.
- Structural engineer: Geiger Engineers
- General contractors: C. Iber & Sons Inc.

Tenants
- Illinois State Redbirds (NCAA); Men's basketball (1989–present); Women's basketball (1989–present); Women's volleyball (1989–present)

Website
- CEFCU Arena

CEFCU Arena, formerly known as Redbird Arena, is a 10,200-seat multi-purpose arena located in Normal, Illinois, on the campus of Illinois State University. Built in 1989, the building is notable for its use of a Teflon-coated roof that gives off a "glow" during night events. Three Illinois State Redbirds athletic teams use the facility as their home court: men's basketball, women's basketball, and women's volleyball.

The arena was renamed CEFCU Arena after the school and CEFCU agreed to a 10-year naming rights deal, starting with the 2023-24 academic year.

== Sports ==
Illinois State is one of just 10 college volleyball programs to draw more than 250,000 fans in the last decade.

Students who enjoy men's basketball and sit in the student section often paint their faces red and wear red T-shirts and become part of "Red Alert", the official student spirit group of Illinois State athletics.

== Amenities ==
CEFCU Arena boasts new scoreboards installed during the 2006-2007 basketball season. The center-hung scoreboard has four-sided HD video boards. They were initiated at the Bradley game when the court was named after ISU great Doug Collins. For the 2011-2012 basketball season an HD video board between opposing benches courtside was installed. It was funded and named after sponsor Frontier Communications Company, that also provided new black leather chairs for players and coaches.

== Miscellaneous ==
CEFCU Arena has hosted a variety of Illinois High School Association events. It has been the home of the girls' volleyball tournament since 1990 and the girls' basketball tournament since 1992. It has also hosted the dual team portion of the state wrestling tournament and in 2006 hosted the inaugural state competitive cheerleading meet.

== See also ==
- List of NCAA Division I basketball arenas
