= Pettengill–Morron House =

Historic house in Illinois, United States

- U.S. National Register of Historic Places
- City of Peoria Local Historic Landmark
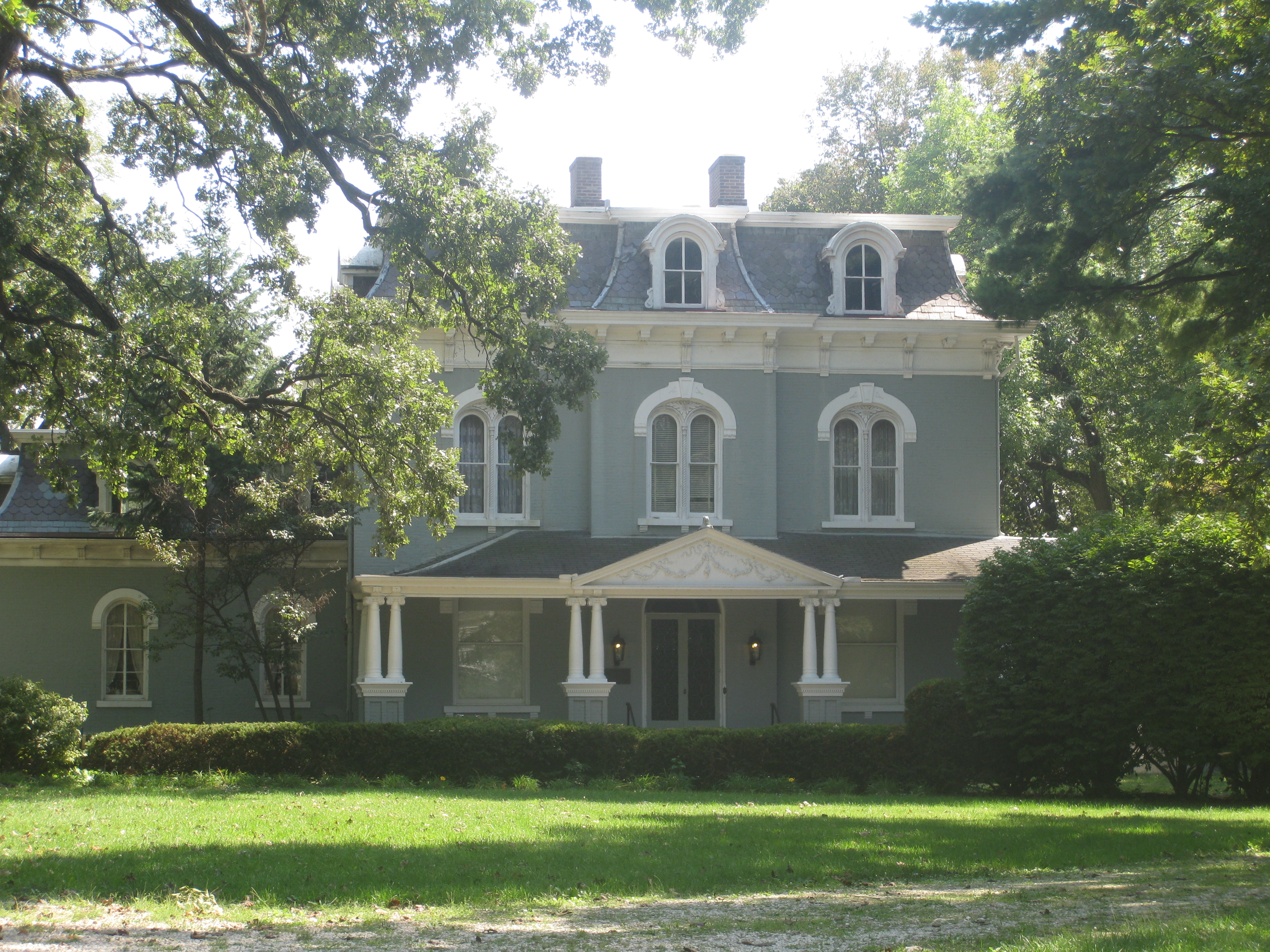

- Location within Peoria County, Illinois Location within Illinois Location within the United States
- Interactive map showing the location of Pettengill-Morron House
- Location: 1212 W. Moss Ave. Peoria, Peoria County, Illinois
- Coordinates: 40°41′40″N 89°36′44″W
- Area: less than one acre
- Built: 1868
- Architect: Charles Ulricson
- Architectural style: Second Empire
- NRHP reference No.: 76000724
- Added to NRHP: April 2, 1976

The Pettengill–Morron House, or simply Morron House, is a historic mansion located in the city of Peoria, Illinois, United States. This Second Empire style home is located in the local historic Moss-High District. The property was added to the National Register of Historic Places and is a City of Peoria Local Historic Landmark. It currently operates as a museum by the Peoria Historical Society.

== History ==
The house was originally built in 1868 for Moses Pettengill, a hardware store owner who came to Peoria from New Hampshire in 1833. When Pettengill arrived in Peoria, there were 150 people, 30 log cabins, and three frame houses. Pettengill and his wife Lucy originally made their home on the site of the present-day Peoria Civic Center from 1836 to 1862.

The original house on the site, an 1862 construction that was built for $5,000, was destroyed by fire on December 13, 1865. A new brick building was constructed in 1868 in the Second Empire style for the cost of $12,000. A Colonial Revival porch and porte-cochere were added in 1900. Its original address was 464 Moss Avenue before Peoria's address renumbering in the 1950s. The last resident was Miss Jean Morron, who lived there from 1953 until she died in 1966; the Peoria Historical Society acquired the house in 1967.

== Legacy ==
The house was listed on the U.S. National Register of Historic Places on April 2, 1976. The home is also listed as a contributing member to the West Bluff Historic District, which was added to the National Register in December 1976. It was added to the City of Peoria Local Historic Landmark list in December 2021. The house received a grant from Landmarks Illinois in 2020 to fund repairs.

The Peoria Historical Society operates this house and the Judge Flanagan Residence as historic house museums. The Pettengill Collection of artifacts was donated by Moses Pettengill's relative, Daisy Peirce Hale. The collection includes paintings that were restored and hung in the museum, Blanchard Pettengill's diary of growing up on the Moss Avenue property, and other family history records.
