= Owens Center =

Multi-purpose ice arena and recreational facility

Coordinates: 40°44′26.6″N 89°36′30.6″W

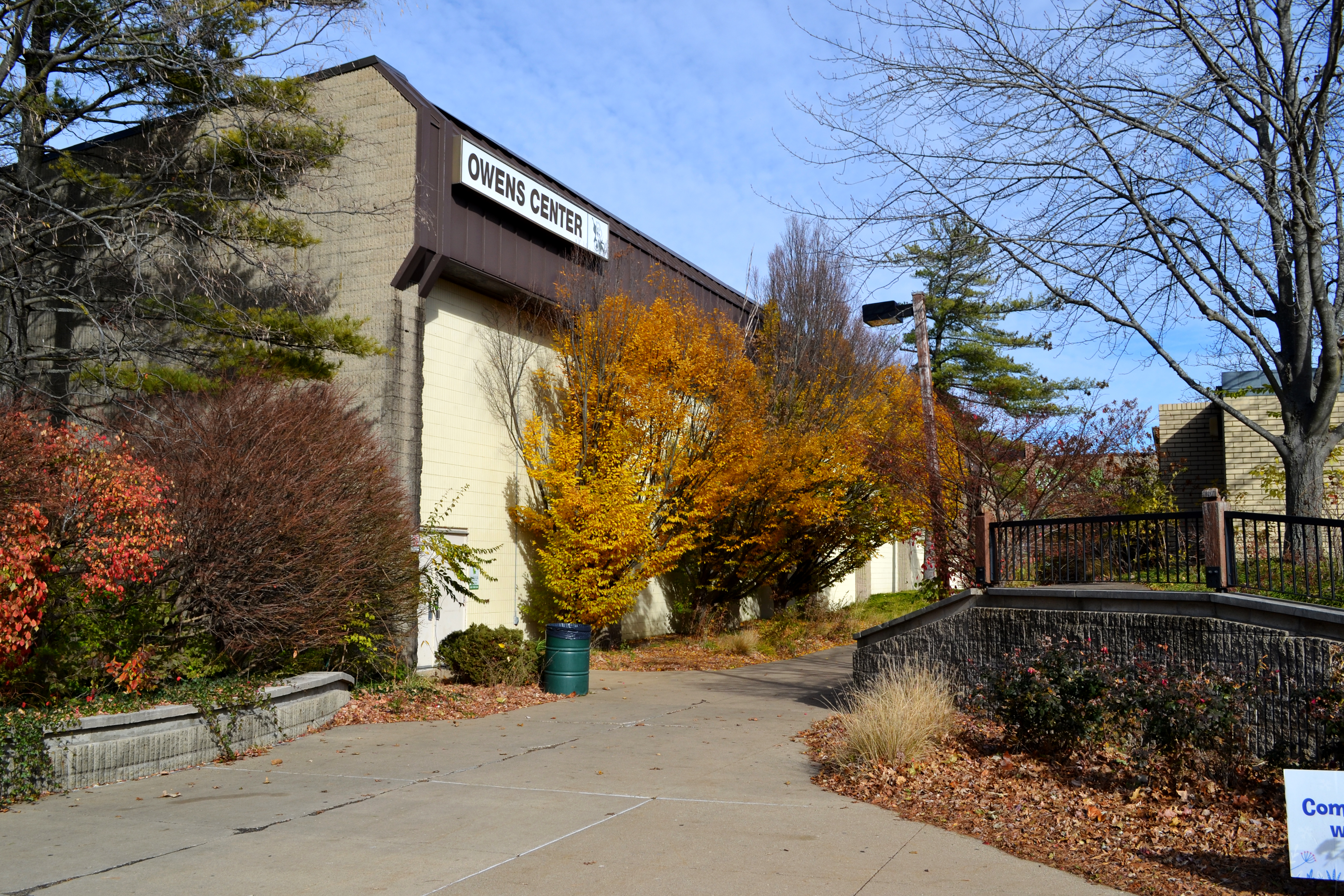
- Owens Center entrance, 2023
- Interactive map of Owens Center
- Location: 1019 W Lake Ave. Peoria, IL 61614
- Surface: 200' x 85'(hockey)
- Public transit: CityLink Route #14

Tenants
- Peoria Mustangs (NA3HL); Robert Morris–Peoria Eagles (ACHA); Bradley Braves (ACHA)

Website
- peoriaparks.org/places/owens-center/

The Owens Center is a multi-purpose ice arena and recreational facility located in Peoria, Illinois. The Owens Center is a part of the Peoria Park District.

It is the home of the Peoria Mustangs of the North American 3 Hockey League (NA3HL), Robert Morris–Peoria Eagles men's hockey team of the American Collegiate Hockey Association (ACHA), and the Bradley Braves club hockey team. In addition to sports, the Owens Center is available for birthday parties, events, and public ice skating.

== History ==
The Owens Center was affected by shutdowns during the COVID-19 pandemic. The center reopened in late January 2021 with limited capacity for Public Skate.
