= Heart of Illinois Fair =

Annual fair in Peoria, Illinois

Coordinates: 40°45′53″N 89°37′7″W

- Status: Active
- Genre: Annual fair
- Frequency: Annually
- Venue: Expo Gardens
- Location: Peoria, Illinois
- Country: USA
- Years active: 76–77
- Area: Central Illinois
- Leader: Roxy Baker
- Sponsors: Peoria County Farm Bureau
- Website: heartofillinoisfair.com

The Heart of Illinois Fair is an annual fair located in Peoria, Illinois, featuring livestock competitions, rides, concessions, motor contests, and concerts. It is held at the Expo Gardens, a fairground in northwest Peoria. A full hook up camping area is also featured on the grounds. Exposition Gardens is a non-profit organization whose goals involve providing opportunities for educational and recreational events.

== History ==
The Peoria District Fair began fundraising in 1945. More than 24,000 people donated and 160 acres of Walter Poppen's farm were purchased for a groundbreaking in April 1948. On April 24, over 100 volunteers moved a quarter-million cubic tons of dirt to level the farmland; it garnered national attention from Time and Life magazines.

Established in 1949, the fair has grown from being centered solely on rides, games, and foods to being centered on bigger events, such as rock concerts, livestock competitions, and tractor pulls.

Half of the acreage was sold in 1955, which eventually became the site of Richwoods High School.

Sideshows (also known as freak shows) continued through the 1970s and 1980s.

2020 saw the fair go on hiatus until 2021, caused by COVID-19 pandemic.

== Attendance ==
Attendance estimates are from IRS filings (Exposition Gardens Inc. EIN: 37-6005523) and news reports.

Attendance by Year
| Decade | 00 | 01 | 02 | 03 | 04 | 05 | 06 | 07 | 08 | 09 |
|---|---|---|---|---|---|---|---|---|---|---|
| 1950s | 40,000 | | | | | | | | | |
| 1960s | | | | | | | | | | |
| 1970s | | 273,062 | | | 309,610 | | | | | |
| 1980s | | | | | | | | | | |
| 1990s | | | | | | | | 245,000 | | |
| 2000s | | | | | | | | | | |
| 2010s | | | | | 45,000 | 45,000 | 40,000 | | | |
| 2020s | | | | | | | | | | |

== Events ==
=== Concerts ===
Over the past years, rock concerts have become a popular part of the fair.

From the 1970s to 2003, several well-known acts performed at the fair, including: Tiny Tim, Jan and Dean, Connie Stevens, Mac Davis, Tanya Tucker, Bo Diddley, Leann Rimes, Mel Tillis, Pat Boone & Family, Glen Campbell, Eddie Rabbitt, Merle Haggard, and Gloria Estefan. Comedians who performed included: Foster Brooks, Gabe Kaplan, Bob Hope, and Alan King.

Due to financial constraints, the fair focuses on "showcasing up-and-coming artists" from central Illinois.

Acts that were featured in the 2008 Heart of Illinois Fair included Mojo Risin (a Doors tribute band), Puddle of Mudd, Saving Abel, Drowning Pool, comedian Joe Recca, Next Generation Wrestling, Night Storm Teen Dance Party, and Confederate Railroad.

=== Motorsports ===
All motorsport events take place in the arena located at Expo Gardens. Motorsports events and competitions include truck and tractor pulls, super semi pulls, demolition derbies, and bog and mud drags.

=== Livestock show ===
The fair features livestock shows for beef cattle, dairy cattle, sheep, goats, horses, and pigs, as well as pig racing.

=== Home Arts ===
The fair's Home Arts department features include gardening, floriculture, textiles, photography exhibits, food competitions, hobby shows, and science exhibits.
