= West Peoria Township, Peoria County, Illinois =

Former township in Illinois

West Peoria Township
- Township
- Location in Peoria County

- Peoria County's location in Illinois
- Coordinates: 40°42′N 89°38′W
- Country: United States
- State: Illinois
- County: Peoria
- Established: November 6, 1849

Government
  - Mayor: James R. Dillon

Area
  - Total: 3.54 sq mi (9.2 km^{2})
  - Land: 3.36 sq mi (8.7 km^{2})
  - Water: 0.18 sq mi (0.47 km^{2}) 5.08%

Population (2010)
  - Estimate (2016): 4,597
- Time zone: UTC-6 (CST)
  - Summer (DST): UTC-5 (CDT)
- FIPS code: 17-143-80749

West Peoria Township was located in Peoria County, Illinois. The township dissolved in May 2021.

== History ==
West Peoria was the portion of Peoria Township that was left when the City of Peoria Township was formed in 1907. It has two parts: the northern, most of which also became the city of West Peoria, Illinois in 1993; and the southern, a triangle between Bartonville, Peoria, and the Illinois River, and including part of Bartonville.

On October 14, 1969, the ‘Town of Peoria’ legally became 'West Peoria Township' to eliminate confusion with the City of Peoria.

In November 2020, voters voted to dissolve the township, passing the referendum 1,159 to 817. In May 2021, the West Peoria Township was dissolved and the City of West Peoria assumed responsibilities for that portion of the township within the city. However, the status of that section of the township outside the city of West Peoria had not been considered upon the dissolution of the township, which left this southern section of the township with no township government at all. With an agreement between the still extant West Peoria Township and the adjacent Limestone Township, the Peoria County Board ordered this section of the township transferred to Limestone Township in June 2023.

== Geography ==
According to the 2010 census, the township had a total area of 3.54 square miles (9.2 km^{2}), of which 3.36 square miles (8.7 km^{2}) (or 94.92%) is land and 0.18 square miles (0.47 km^{2}) (or 5.08%) is water.

=== Cities ===
- Bartonville (small portion)
- Peoria (part)
- West Peoria (mostly)

== Demographics ==
As of the 2010 census, its population was 4,458 and it contained 2,123 housing units.

Historical population
Census	Pop.	Note	%±
2016 (est.)	4,597
U.S. Decennial Census
