= Peoria Civic Center =

Convention center in Illinois, United States

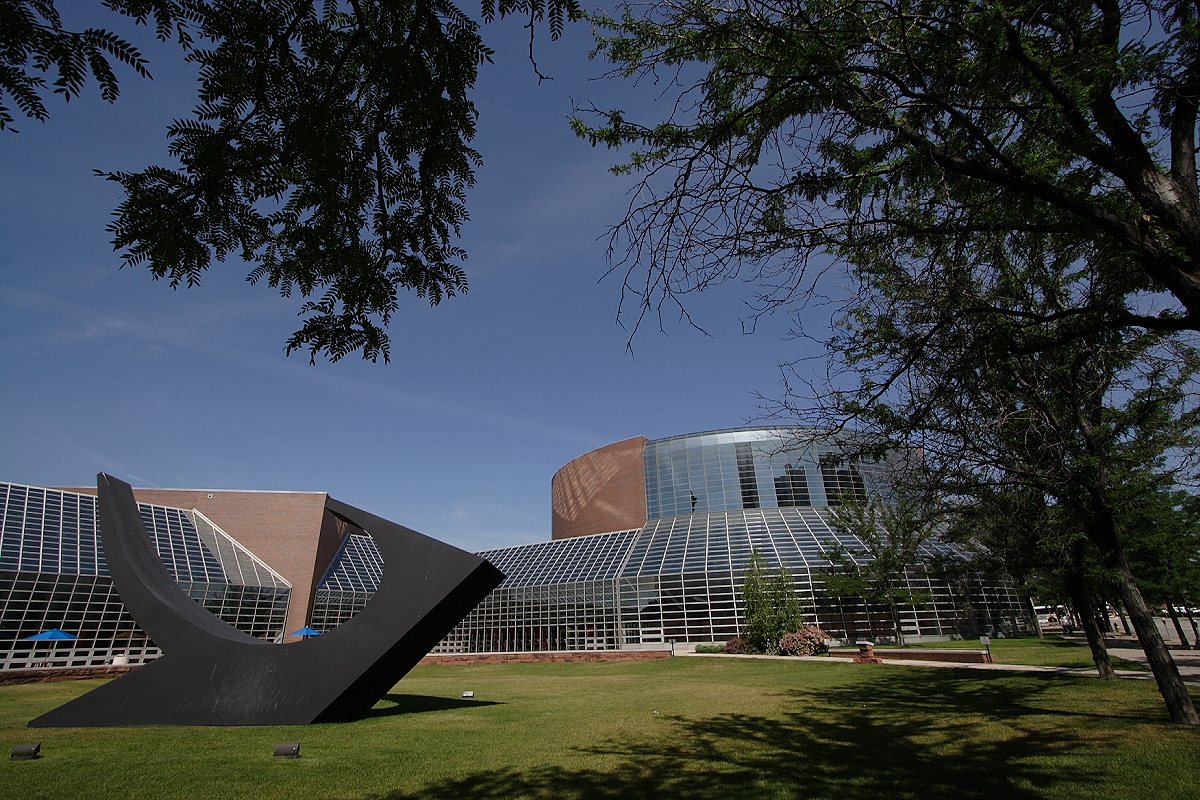
- Exterior of complex (c.2006)

- Location within Illinois Location within the United States

General information
- Location: Downtown Peoria, 201 SW Jefferson Ave; Peoria, IL 61602-1423
- Coordinates: 40°41′30″N 89°35′39″W
- Groundbreaking: April 30, 1979
- Opened: February 1982
- Inaugurated: June 6, 1982
- Renovated: June 2005-May 2007
- Cost: $64.2 million ($285 million in 2025 dollars)
- Renovation cost: $55 million ($90.7 million in 2025 dollars)
- Owner: City of Peoria

Technical details
- Size: Exhibit halls: 108,668 sq ft (10,095.6 m^{2}); Meeting/breakout rooms: 17,355 sq ft (1,612.3 m^{2}); Ballrooms: 28,667 sq ft (2,663.3 m^{2}); Arena: 27,400 sq ft (2,550 m^{2}); Theater: 7,000 sq ft (650 m^{2})

Design and construction
- Architects: Philip Johnson; John Burgee

Renovating team
- Architect: HOK Sport Venue Event
- Engineer: Dewberry
- Services engineer: STS Engineering
- Other designers: Advanced Audio & Light; Convergence Design; Zalk Josephs Fabricators
- Main contractor: Turner Construction

Other information
- Public transit: CityLink

Website
- Complex Website
- Carver Arena
- Former names: Peoria Civic Center Arena (1982–2001)
- Operator: ASM Global
- Capacity: 12,000 Detailed capacity: 9,919 (Ice hockey and indoor football); 11,433 (Basketball); 12,036 (Concerts)

Construction
- Opened: 1982
- Renovated: 1992; 2005-07; 2024

Tenants
- Bradley Braves (NCAA) (1982–present); Peoria Rivermen (SPHL) (2013–present); Peoria Pirates (IFL/AF2) (1999–2004, 2008–09)

Peoria Civic Center is an entertainment complex located in downtown Peoria, Illinois. Designed by Pritzker Prize winning architect Philip Johnson and John Burgee, it has an arena, theater, exhibit hall and meeting rooms. It opened in 1982 and completed an expansion to its lobby and meeting facilities in 2007. On the grounds of the Peoria Civic Center sits the massive Sonar Tide, the last and largest sculpture of the pioneer of abstract minimalism Ronald Bladen.

== History ==
The site of the Civic Center includes the spot at Liberty Street and Jefferson Street, where Moses and Lucy Pettengill lived from 1836 to 1862; that house was part of the Underground Railroad and Moses was also an Underground Railroad "conductor". In 1862, the Pettingills moved out of downtown and to Moss Avenue, where the present Pettengill–Morron House was built in 1868. The downtown home was demolished in 1910 to make way for the Jefferson Hotel. The hotel, in turn, was imploded in 1978 to make way for the Civic Center.

Peoria Civic Center opened on June 6, 1982. The first event at the Civic Center was a home and garden show in the Exhibit Hall in February 1982.

== Facilities ==
=== Carver Arena ===
Carver Arena has been hosts to acts such as Metallica, Eagles, Elton John, Bob Seger, Kiss, Blake Shelton, Eric Church, Luke Bryan, Luke Combs, Jason Aldean, Cher, Janet Jackson, James Taylor, Avenged Sevenfold, Shinedown, Godsmack, AJR, Five Finger Death Punch, The Harlem Globetrotters, World Wrestling Entertainment, Disney, Monster Jam, Hot Wheels Monster Trucks Live, Disney on Ice, and basketball exhibition games for the Chicago Bulls.

From July 19 to 21, 2002, the Civic Center hosted the third annual Gathering of the Juggalos organized by Detroit-based hip hop group Insane Clown Posse's Psychopathic Records which drew over 8,000 people to the festival.

As of 2013, seating capacity was 9,919 for hockey and indoor football, 11,433 for basketball and up to 12,036 for concerts.

Bob Seger set the record for the highest-grossing concert in venue history on January 22, 2019. The previous record was held by an Elton John concert in 2011.

Reba McEntire set a record for top-selling country concert in venue history on March 18, 2022. The previous record holder was Blake Shelton.

Carver Arena hosted the Illinois High School Association boys' basketball state finals for two weeks every March from 1996 until 2019. The interactive March Madness Experience took place in the adjacent exhibition hall during the tournaments.

=== Prairie Home Alliance Theater ===
Steve Martin and Martin Short's Now You See Them, Soon You Won't event on April 20, 2019, set the record for top comedy show in Peoria Civic Center Theater's History. In March 2022, comedian Gabriel Iglesias set an all-time box office record, which comedian Bill Burr broke six months later.

Harry Connick Jr. set a new box office record for a concert in the theater with his December 3, 2022 performance.

Pollstar ranked the Peoria Civic Center Theater as the 96th top selling theater in the world and 3rd in state of Illinois behind Chicago-based venues Chicago Theatre and Rosemont Theatre.

==== Tenants ====
- Peoria Symphony Orchestra
- Peoria Ballet
- Bradley Braves men's basketball
- Peoria Rivermen (SPHL)

== See also ==
- List of convention centers in the United States
- List of NCAA Division I basketball arenas
