= Peoria Symphony Orchestra =

Orchestra in Peoria, Illinois

Peoria Symphony Orchestra (PSO)
- Orchestra
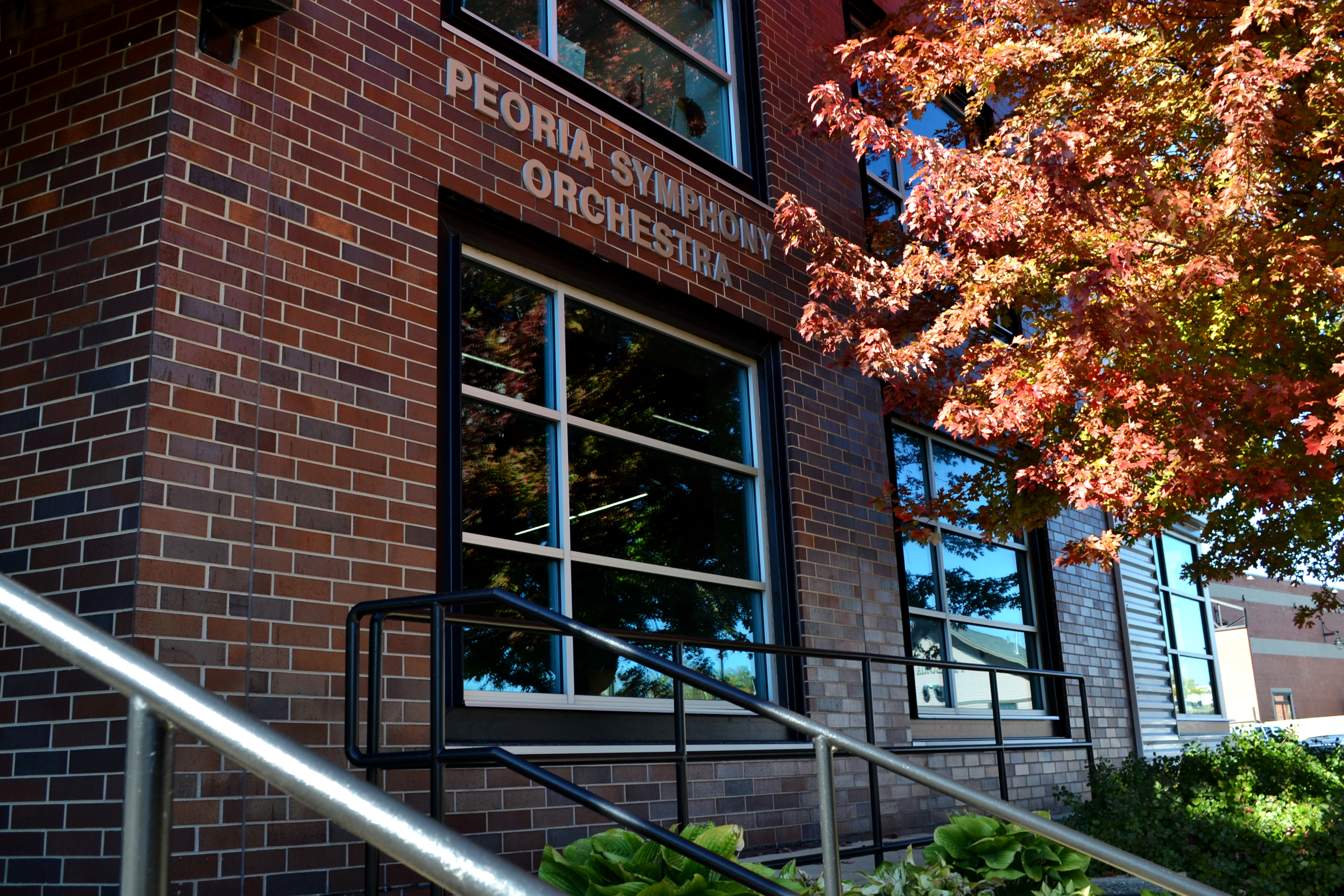
- Peoria Symphony Orchestra offices on State Street, Downtown Peoria
- Former name: Bradley Symphony Orchestra
- Founded: 1898
- Location: Peoria, Illinois
- Concert hall: Peoria Civic Center
- Principal conductor: George Stelluto
- Website: www.peoriasymphony.org

The Peoria Symphony Orchestra is an American orchestra based in Peoria, Illinois conducted by George Stelluto. It is the fourteenth oldest orchestra in the United States.

== History ==
Founded in 1897 as Bradley University's Bradley Symphony Orchestra, Harold Plowe was the first conductor.

On December 5, 1916, the orchestra was incorporated as the Peoria Symphony Orchestra.

After Plowe retired in 1927, the next fifty years saw almost a dozen conductors lead the orchestra. In 1978, William Wilsen became musical director and led the group until 1999. Wilsen developed the orchestra's quality and repertoire, took it on tour to its sister city, Friedrichshafen, Germany, and led the PSO's celebration of its 100th year. Conductor David Commanday was named music director in the spring of 1999. During his tenure the orchestra was praised for its quality and imaginative programs:

"The Peoria Symphony Orchestra’s evolution under the baton of music director David Commanday has been fascinating to watch. Orchestra members aren't just showing up for another gig. There’s a real joy in their playing, a certain esprit d/corps. And the repertoire is getting more varied and more playful with every season. The concerts – dare I say it? – actually are fun to attend” (Gary Panetta, Peoria Journal Star, 3/31/03).

Commanday's leadership of the orchestra concluded at the end of the 2008–2009 season, marking a decade in which the institution had roughly doubled its endowment. Commanday left the Peoria Symphony Orchestra to found a new venture, the Heartland Festival Orchestra.

George Stelluto became the music director on September 18, 2010.

During the COVID-19 pandemic, the orchestra's 123rd year was challenged with restrictions to live audiences. The orchestra performed a telecast on the local PBS station, WTVP. Other concerts had a limited audience of 100, with an option to live-stream. This initiative was called "#PSOAtHome", which offered access to recorded concerts and educational materials.

== Performances ==
The orchestra performs at the Peoria Civic Center. Featured soloists include: Emanuel Ax, Joshua Bell, Evelyn Glennie, Hilary Hahn, Sharon Isbin, Yo-Yo Ma, and Itzhak Perlman.

The orchestra also performs in classrooms, hospitals, and senior living centers, for audiences who may not otherwise be able to attend. Nearly 4,000 students attend concerts at low or no cost.

=== Notable performances ===
- 1989 - International Bodensee Festival, Germany
- 2012 - Gustav Holst’s “The Planets” for a commissioned film by Max R. A. Fedore

== Awards ==
- 2011 - ASCAP Award
- 2012 - ASCAP Award for Adventurous Programming
- 2013 - Professional Orchestra of the Year Award, Illinois Council of Orchestras
- 2017 - ArtsPartner of the Year Award
