= Peoria, Illinois =

Peoria
- City
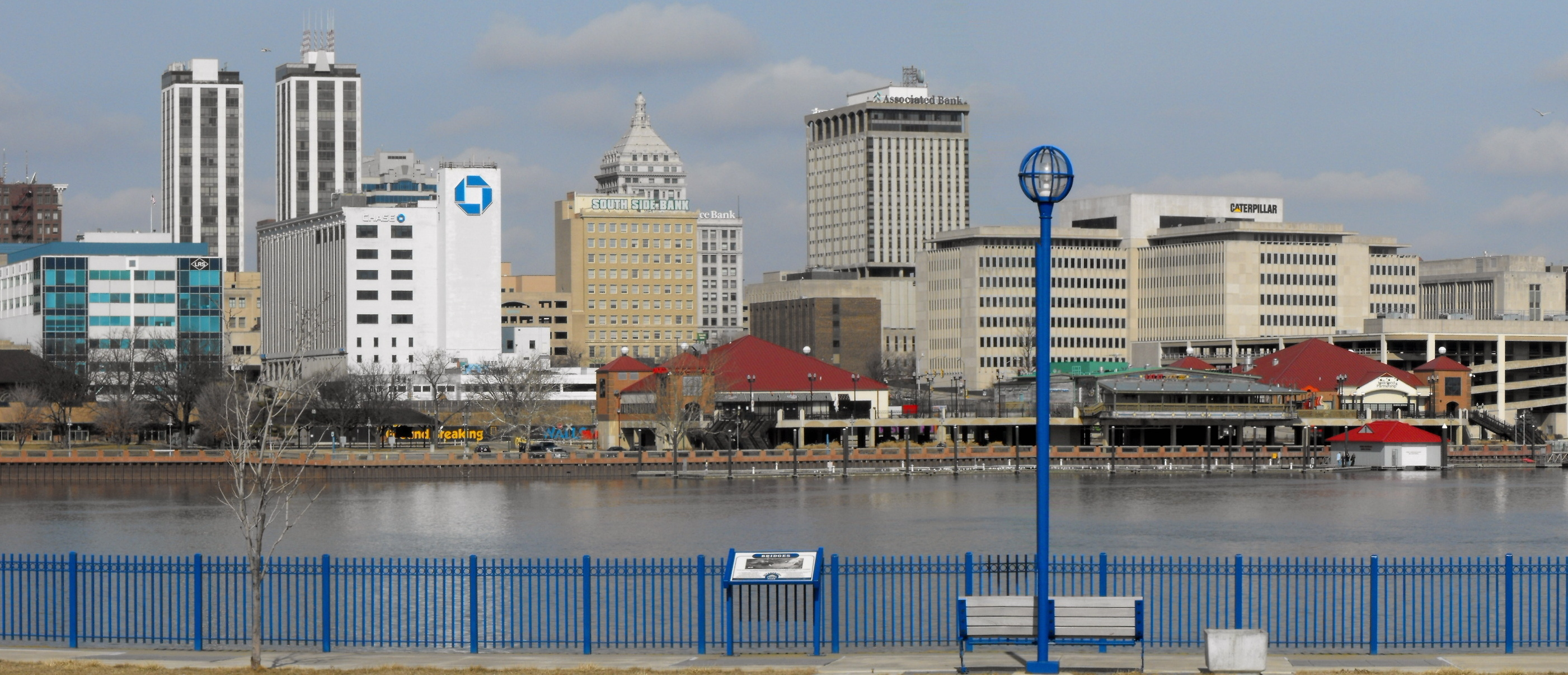
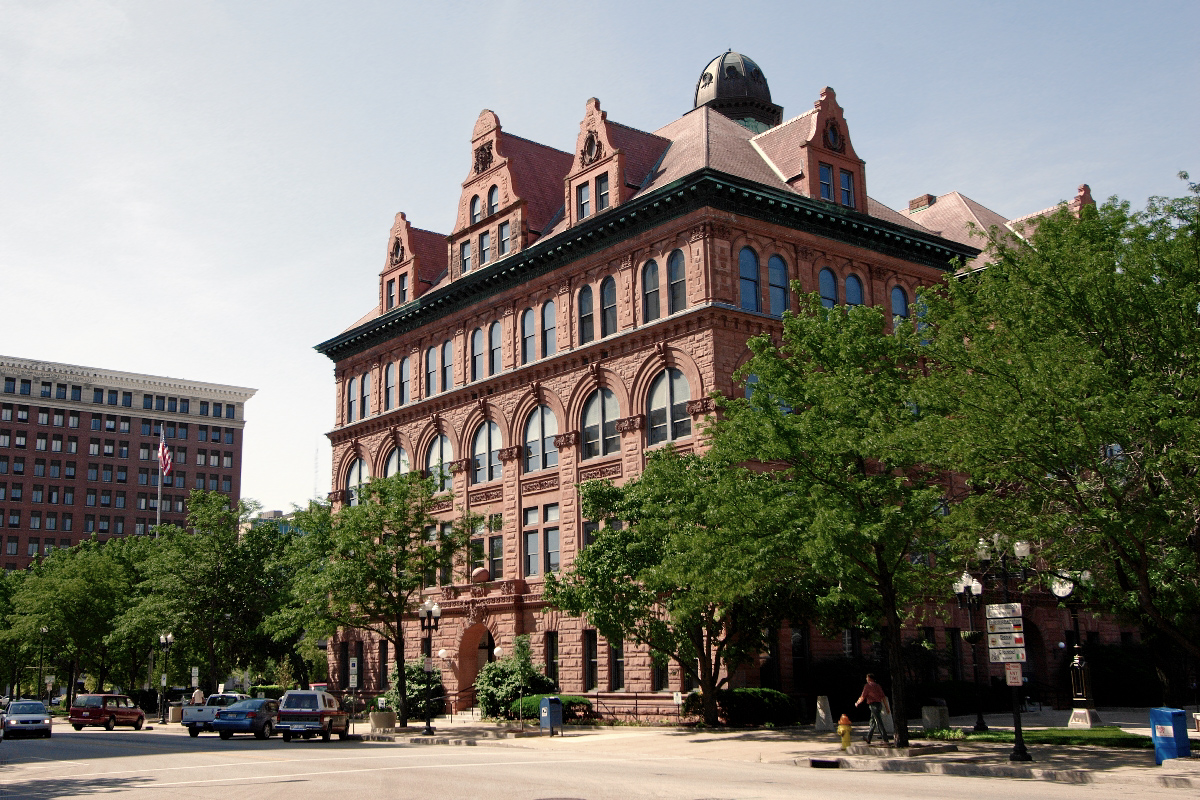
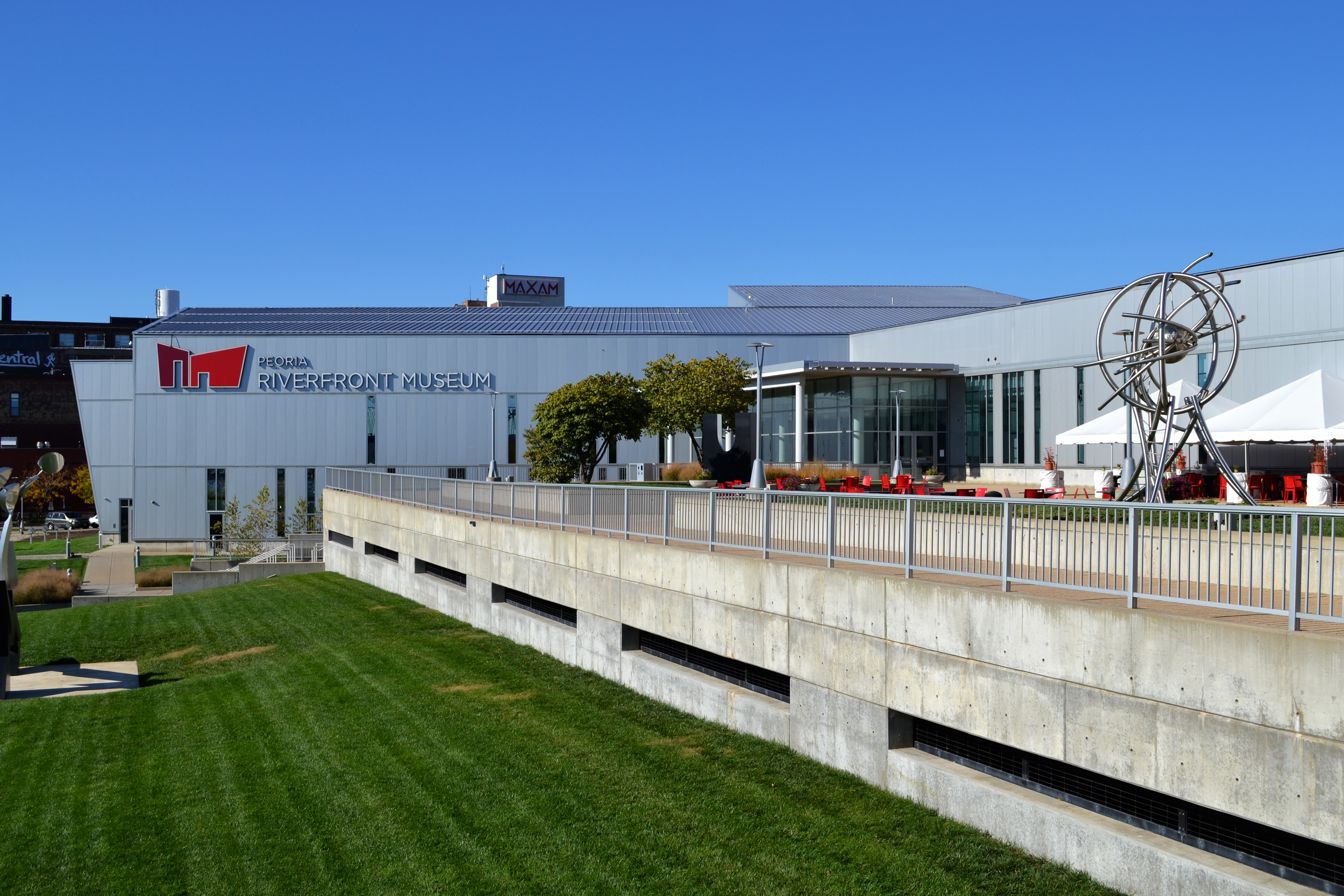
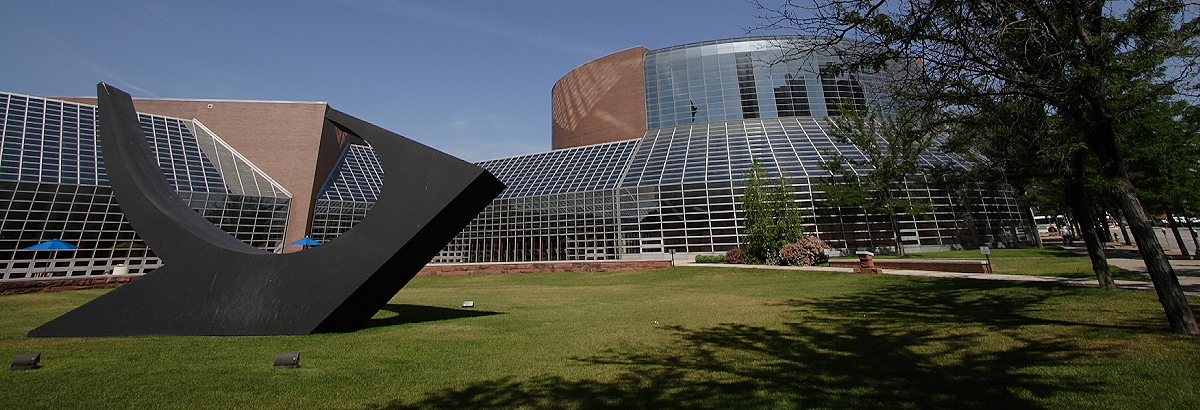
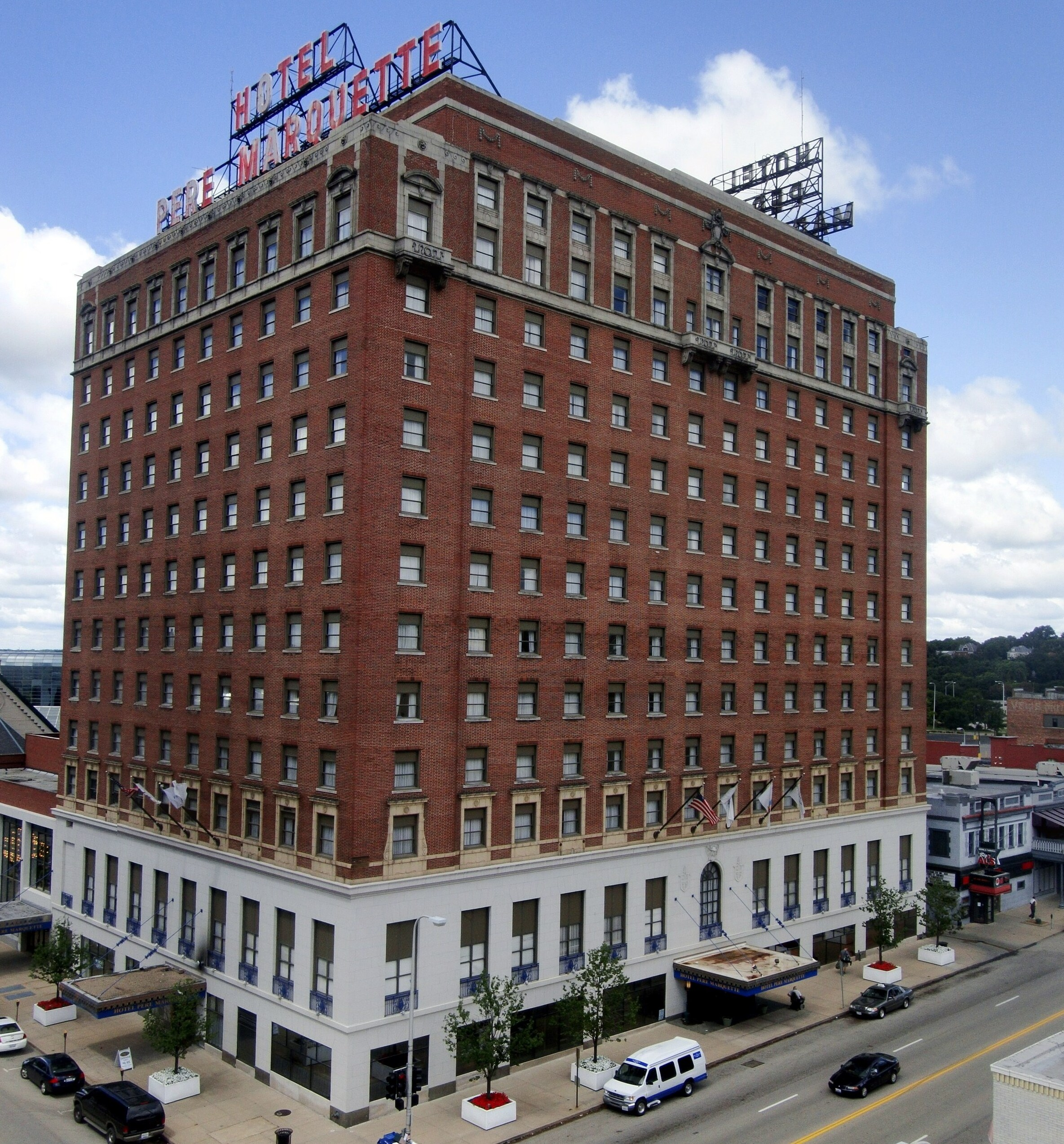
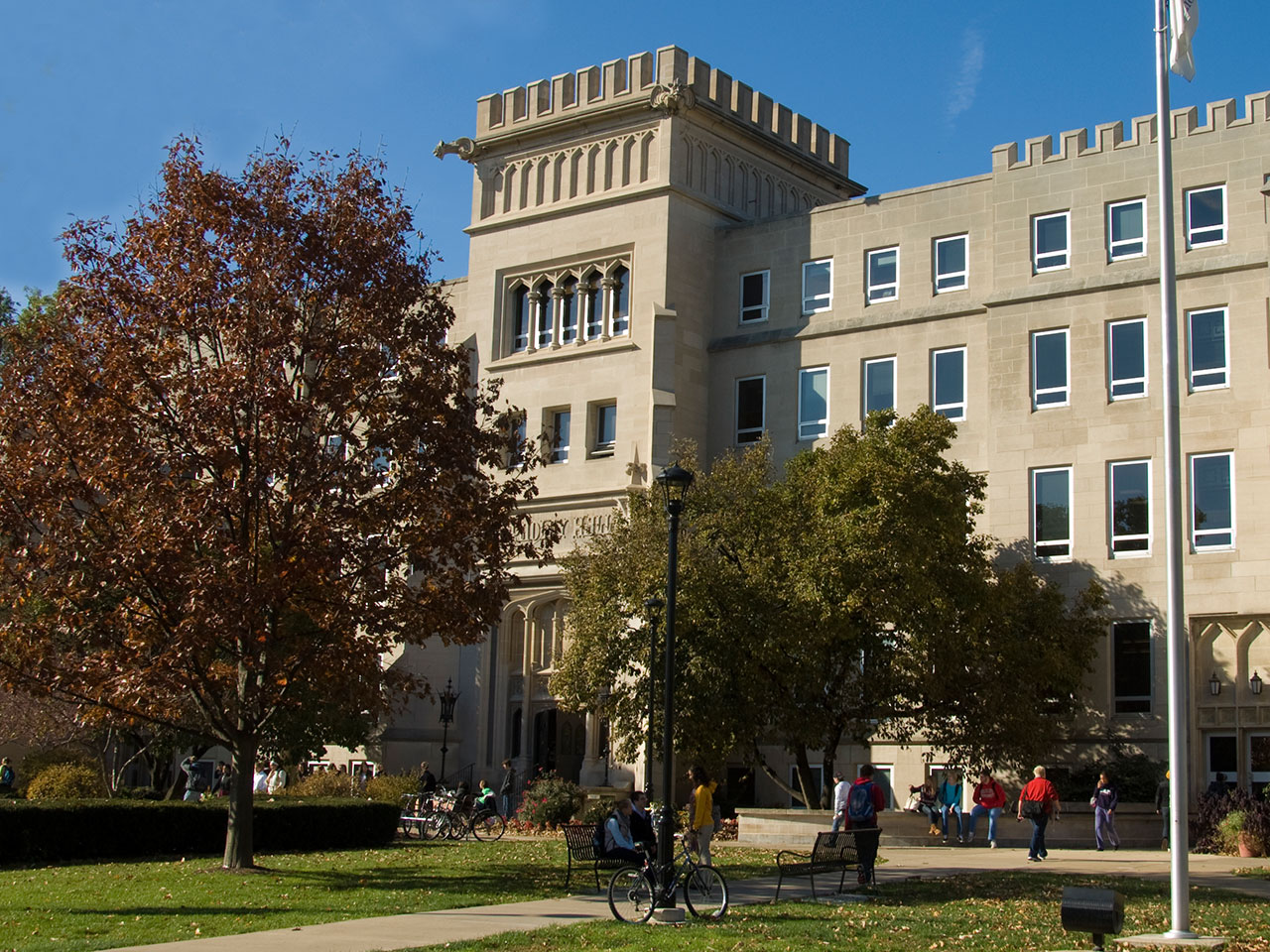
- Peoria Skyline and Illinois River Peoria City Hall Riverfront Museum Peoria Civic Center Hotel Père Marquette Bradley University

- Flag Logo
- Interactive map of Peoria
- Location within Illinois Location within the United States
- Coordinates: 40°41′34″N 89°35′26″W
- Country: United States
- State: Illinois
- County: Peoria
- Townships: Kickapoo, Medina, Peoria City, Radnor, Richwoods, West Peoria
- Settled: 1691
- Incorporated Town: 1835
- Incorporated City: 1845
- Named for: Peoria people

Government
  - Type: Council-Manager
  - Mayor: Rita Ali (D)

Area
  - City: 50.55 sq mi (130.93 km^{2})
  - Land: 47.97 sq mi (124.24 km^{2})
  - Water: 2.58 sq mi (6.69 km^{2})
- Elevation: 712 ft (217 m)

Population (2020)
  - City: 113,150 (8th in Illinois)
  - Estimate (2024): 111,696 ▼
  - Density: 2,360/sq mi (911/km^{2})
  - Urban: 259,781 (US: 156th)
  - Urban density: 1,781.9/sq mi (688.0/km^{2})
  - Metro: 402,391 (US: 138th)
- Demonym: Peorian
- Time zone: UTC−6 (CST)
  - Summer (DST): UTC−5 (CDT)
- ZIP Codes: 29 total ZIP Codes: 61601–61607, 61612–61615, 61625, 61629, 61630, 61633, 61634, 61636–61639, 61641, 61643, 61650–61656
- Area code: 309
- FIPS code: 17-59000
- GNIS feature ID: 2396178
- Website: www.peoriagov.org

Peoria (/piˈɔːriə/ pee-OR-ee-ə) is a city in Peoria County, Illinois, United States, and its county seat. Located on the Illinois River, the city had a population of 113,150 as of the 2020 census, making it the eighth-most populous city in Illinois. It is the principal city of the Peoria metropolitan area in Central Illinois, consisting of Fulton, Marshall, Peoria, Stark, Tazewell, and Woodford counties and had a combined population of 402,391 in 2020.

Established in 1691 by the French explorer Henri de Tonti, Peoria is the oldest permanent European settlement in Illinois, according to the Illinois State Archaeological Survey. The city received its current name when the County of Peoria was organized in 1825 and was named after the Peoria people, a member of the Illinois Confederation. On October 16, 1854, Abraham Lincoln made his Peoria speech against the Kansas–Nebraska Act. Before the onset of Prohibition in 1920, Peoria was a major center of the American whiskey industry, with more than a dozen distilleries operating in the city by the late 19th century—a greater concentration than in any other U.S. city at that time.

A major port on the Illinois River, Peoria is a trading and shipping center for a large agricultural area that produces corn, soybeans, and livestock. While Peoria’s economy is diversified, manufacturing—including heavy machinery, agricultural equipment, metal products, and chemical production—continues to play an important role. Until 2018, Peoria was the global and national headquarters for heavy equipment and engine manufacturer Caterpillar Inc., one of the 30 companies composing the Dow Jones Industrial Average, and listed on the Fortune 100; the company relocated its headquarters to Deerfield, Illinois, in 2018, and then Irving, Texas, in 2022.

The city is associated with the phrase "Will it play in Peoria?", which may have originated from the vaudeville era and is often spuriously attributed to Groucho Marx. Museums in the city include the Peoria Riverfront Museum, the Pettengill–Morron House and the John C. Flanagan House (both of which are managed by the Peoria Historical Society), and the Peoria Playhouse Children's Museum. Wheels o' Time Museum is near Peoria.

== History ==
Peoria was the earliest permanent European settlement in what is now Illinois; French explorers first established a presence along the Illinois River in the late 17th century, with the community later evolving into the modern city. The lands that eventually would become Peoria were first settled by Europeans in 1680, when French explorers René-Robert Cavelier, Sieur de La Salle and Henri de Tonti constructed Fort Crevecoeur. This fort burned to the ground, and in 1813, Fort Clark, Illinois was built. When the County of Peoria was organized in 1825, Fort Clark was officially named Peoria.

Peoria was named after the Peoria tribe, a member of the Illinois Confederation; linguistic scholars have proposed an origin in Proto-Algonquian meaning “to dream with the help of a manitou,” but the etymology remains uncertain. A 21st-century proposal suggests a derivation from a Proto-Algonquian word meaning "to dream with the help of a manitou." Peoria was incorporated as a village on March 11, 1835. The city did not have a mayor, though they had a village president, Rudolphus Rouse, who served from 1835 to 1836. The first Chief of Police, John B Lishk, was appointed in 1837. The city was incorporated on April 21, 1845. This was the end of a village president and the start of the mayoral system, with the first mayor being William Hale. Peoria, Arizona, a suburb of Phoenix, was named after Peoria, Illinois because the two men who founded it in 1890 − Joseph B. Greenhut and Deloss S. Brown − wished to name it after their hometown.

Peoria was significant in the world of bicycle racing during the late 19th century. Held at Lake View Park, its U.S. bicycle racing stop hosted such notable names as Marshall "Major" Taylor, who became world champion. Taylor described Peoria as the "Mecca" for the sport. For much of the 20th century, Peoria hosted a red-light district of brothels and bars known as the Merry-Go-Round. Richard Pryor got his start as a performer on North Washington Street in the early 1960s.

In 2021, Rita Ali became Peoria's first female and African American mayor. Though it had been named one of the fastest-shrinking cities as recently as 2021, later in the 2020s, Peoria became notable for its trend of urban gentrification — still a rarity in many midsized Midwestern cities. TikTok user Angie Ostazewski was profiled in the New York Times after being credited with convincing upwards of 300 people to relocate to Peoria, using her profile to advertise the city's dining and arts scene and low-priced, historic housing.

=== Notable events ===
- September 19 to October 21, 1813 – Peoria War
- 1844 – Abraham Lincoln came to Peoria to get involved in the Aquilla Wren divorce case and took it to the Supreme Court of Illinois
- April 15, 1926 – Charles Lindbergh's first air mail route, Contract Air Mail route #2, began running mail from Chicago to Peoria to Springfield to St. Louis and back. There is nothing to substantiate the local legend that Lindbergh offered Peoria the chance to sponsor his trans-Atlantic flight and call his plane the "Spirit of Peoria," but he does state that he first pondered the journey after taking off from the Peoria air mail field.
- 1942 – Penicillium chrysogenum, the fungus originally used to industrially produce penicillin, was first isolated from a moldy cantaloupe found in a grocery store in Peoria.
- Local legend is that Theodore Roosevelt called Grandview Drive, a street on the bluffs overlooking the Illinois River "the world's most beautiful drive" during his visit in 1910. However, no contemporaneous accounts of this story appeared, even in local papers and histories, for over two decades after it supposedly occurred. A related legend claims that the Peoria radio station and CBS television affiliate, WMBD, chose its call sign based on this story. In fact, the WMBD letters were assigned randomly and the meaning behind it was invented after the fact in 1927.

== Geography ==
According to the 2010 census, Peoria has a total area of 50.23 square miles (130.10 km^{2}), of which 48.01 square miles (124.35 km^{2}) (or 95.58%) is land and 2.22 square miles (5.75 km^{2}) (or 4.42%) is water.

=== Climate ===
Peoria has a humid continental climate (Köppen Dfa), with cold, snowy winters, and hot, humid summers. Monthly daily mean temperatures range from 22.5 °F (−5.3 °C) to 75.2 °F (24.0 °C). Snowfall is common in the winter, averaging 26.3 inches (67 cm), but this figure varies considerably from year to year. Precipitation, averaging 36 inches (914 mm), peaks in the spring and summer, and is the lowest in winter. Extremes have ranged from −27 °F (−33 °C) in January 1884 to 113 °F (45 °C) in July 1936.

Climate data for Peoria, Illinois (Peoria Int'l), 1991–2020 normals, extremes 1883–present
Month	Jan	Feb	Mar	Apr	May	Jun	Jul	Aug	Sep	Oct	Nov	Dec	Year
Record high °F (°C)	71 (22)	78 (26)	87 (31)	92 (33)	104 (40)	105 (41)	113 (45)	106 (41)	104 (40)	93 (34)	81 (27)	71 (22)	113 (45)
Mean maximum °F (°C)	55.0 (12.8)	59.6 (15.3)	73.3 (22.9)	82.1 (27.8)	88.4 (31.3)	93.4 (34.1)	94.9 (34.9)	94.1 (34.5)	90.8 (32.7)	83.7 (28.7)	69.9 (21.1)	59.2 (15.1)	96.9 (36.1)
Mean daily maximum °F (°C)	33.6 (0.9)	38.7 (3.7)	51.2 (10.7)	63.7 (17.6)	74.2 (23.4)	83.2 (28.4)	86.3 (30.2)	84.6 (29.2)	78.4 (25.8)	65.4 (18.6)	50.8 (10.4)	38.5 (3.6)	62.4 (16.9)
Daily mean °F (°C)	25.6 (−3.6)	30.0 (−1.1)	41.4 (5.2)	52.9 (11.6)	63.5 (17.5)	72.8 (22.7)	76.3 (24.6)	74.5 (23.6)	67.4 (19.7)	54.9 (12.7)	41.9 (5.5)	30.9 (−0.6)	52.7 (11.5)
Mean daily minimum °F (°C)	17.6 (−8.0)	21.4 (−5.9)	31.6 (−0.2)	42.1 (5.6)	52.8 (11.6)	62.4 (16.9)	66.3 (19.1)	64.4 (18.0)	56.3 (13.5)	44.4 (6.9)	33.0 (0.6)	23.2 (−4.9)	43.0 (6.1)
Mean minimum °F (°C)	−5.5 (−20.8)	1.6 (−16.9)	12.0 (−11.1)	26.8 (−2.9)	37.6 (3.1)	49.3 (9.6)	55.7 (13.2)	54.1 (12.3)	41.6 (5.3)	28.6 (−1.9)	16.3 (−8.7)	2.7 (−16.3)	−9.0 (−22.8)
Record low °F (°C)	−27 (−33)	−26 (−32)	−10 (−23)	14 (−10)	25 (−4)	39 (4)	46 (8)	41 (5)	26 (−3)	7 (−14)	−2 (−19)	−24 (−31)	−27 (−33)
Average precipitation inches (mm)	2.06 (52)	1.99 (51)	2.69 (68)	3.99 (101)	4.69 (119)	3.73 (95)	3.53 (90)	3.31 (84)	3.48 (88)	3.17 (81)	2.70 (69)	2.21 (56)	37.55 (954)
Average snowfall inches (cm)	7.7 (20)	6.9 (18)	3.3 (8.4)	0.5 (1.3)	0.0 (0.0)	0.0 (0.0)	0.0 (0.0)	0.0 (0.0)	0.0 (0.0)	0.1 (0.25)	1.5 (3.8)	6.2 (16)	26.2 (67)
Average precipitation days (≥ 0.01 in)	9.9	9.2	10.5	11.6	12.5	10.5	8.7	8.4	7.6	9.5	9.1	9.7	117.2
Average snowy days (≥ 0.1 in)	6.2	4.9	2.2	0.6	0.0	0.0	0.0	0.0	0.0	0.1	1.4	4.6	20.0
Average relative humidity (%)	73.9	73.8	70.5	64.7	66.2	67.3	71.7	73.7	72.7	70.4	74.5	78.0	71.5
Mean monthly sunshine hours	147.4	155.6	187.9	222.8	272.6	306.9	310.1	279.3	233.2	204.2	127.9	118.7	2,566.6
Percentage possible sunshine	53	53	50	57	63	69	70	68	66	62	47	44	60
Source: NOAA (sun and relative humidity 1961–1990)

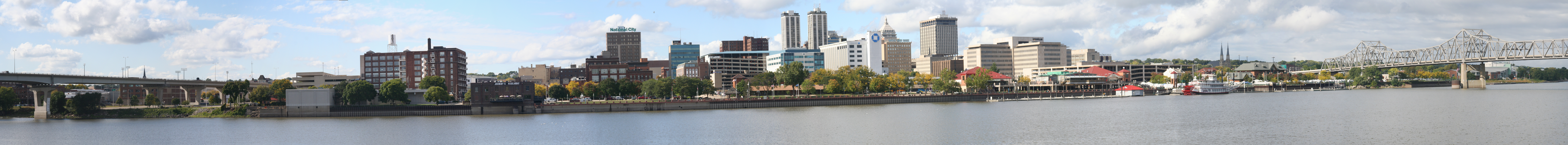
Panorama of downtown Peoria, viewed from across the Illinois River in East Peoria, in the middle are the Twin Towers, the former Caterpillar World Headquarters Building, and the Associated Bank Building

== Demographics ==
Historical population
Census	Pop.	Note	%±
1840	1,467		—
1850	5,095		247.3%
1860	14,045		175.7%
1870	22,849		62.7%
1880	29,259		28.1%
1890	41,024		40.2%
1900	56,100		36.7%
1910	66,950		19.3%
1920	76,121		13.7%
1930	104,969		37.9%
1940	105,087		0.1%
1950	111,856		6.4%
1960	103,162		−7.8%
1970	126,963		23.1%
1980	124,160		−2.2%
1990	113,504		−8.6%
2000	112,936		−0.5%
2010	115,007		1.8%
2020	113,150		−1.6%
U.S. Decennial Census; 2010 2020

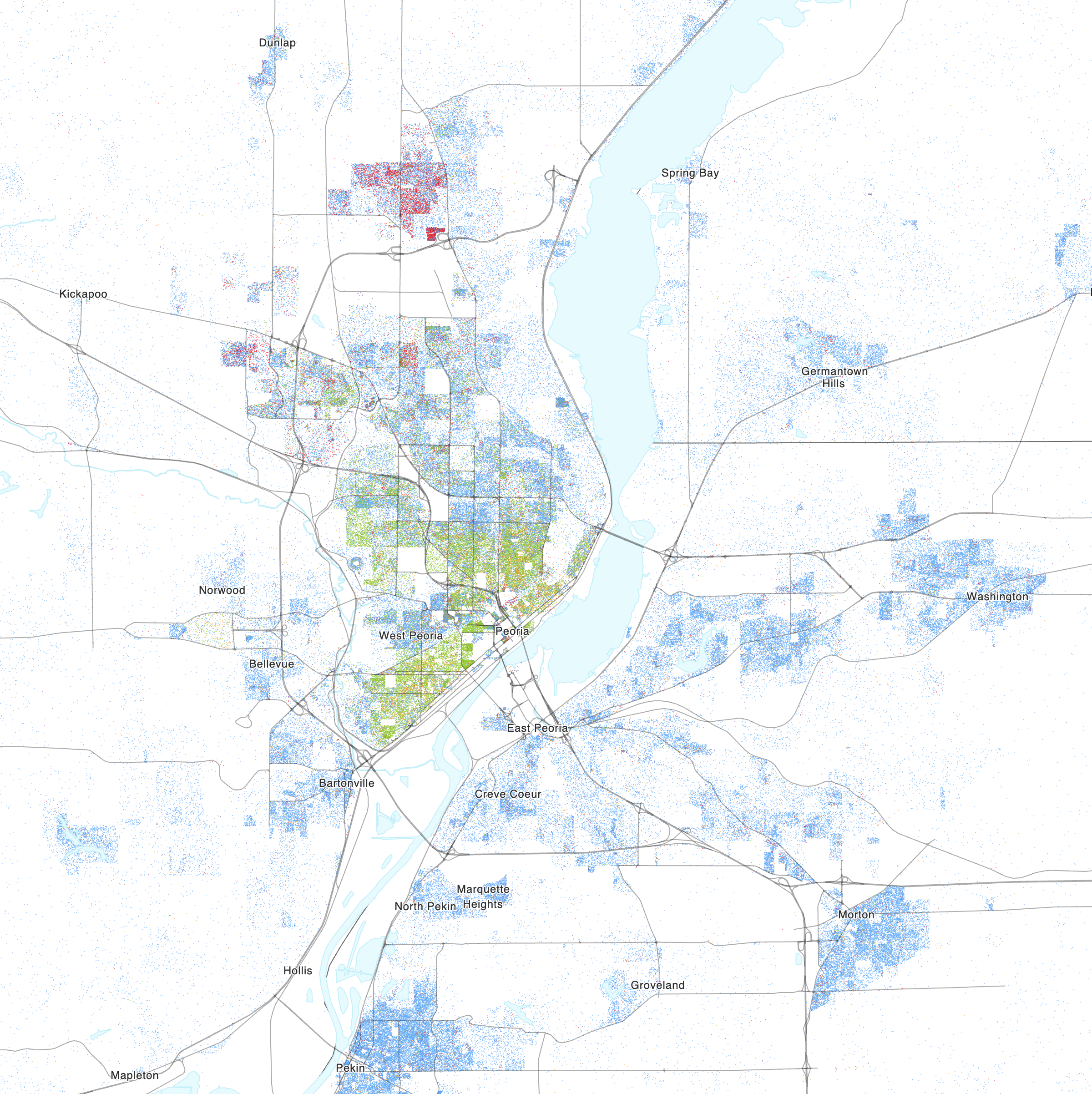
Map of racial distribution in Peoria, 2020 U.S. census. Each dot is one person: ⬤ White ⬤ Black ⬤ Asian ⬤ Hispanic ⬤ Multiracial ⬤ Native American/Other

=== 2020 census ===
Peoria, Illinois – Racial and ethnic composition Note: the US Census treats Hispanic/Latino as an ethnic category. This table excludes Latinos from the racial categories and assigns them to a separate category. Hispanics/Latinos may be of any race.
Race / Ethnicity (NH = Non-Hispanic)	Pop 2000	Pop 2010	Pop 2020	% 2000	% 2010	% 2020
White alone (NH)	77,138	69,454	60,364	68.30%	60.39%	53.35%
Black or African American alone (NH)	27,783	30,705	31,213	24.60%	26.70%	27.59%
Native American or Alaska Native alone (NH)	207	233	229	0.18%	0.20%	0.20%
Asian alone (NH)	2,603	5,214	7,184	2.30%	4.53%	6.35%
Native Hawaiian or Pacific Islander alone (NH)	31	27	42	0.03%	0.02%	0.04%
Other race alone (NH)	230	241	586	0.20%	0.21%	0.52%
Mixed race or Multiracial (NH)	2,105	3,505	5,633	1.86%	3.05%	4.98%
Hispanic or Latino (any race)	2,839	5,628	7,899	2.51%	4.89%	6.98%
Total	112,936	115,007	113,150	100.00%	100.00%	100.00%

According to the 2021 American Community Survey, Peoria's poverty rate was 19.7 percent. Median household income was estimated to be 53,568 in 2022. Population was estimated to have decreased approximately 1.9% from 113,176 to 111,021 between 2020 and 2022. According to 24/7 Wall St, in 2018 Peoria ranked as the 5th worst city for Black Americans based on income, educational, and unemployment disparities between Black and white residents.

=== 2010 Census ===
As of the census of 2010, there were 115,021 people and 47,202 households residing in the city. The population density was 2,543 inhabitants per square mile (982/km^{2}). There were 52,621 housing units. The racial makeup of the city was 62.4% White, 26.9% Black or African American, 0.3% Native American, 4.6% Asian, and 3.6% of mixed races. Hispanic or Latino of any race were 4.9% of the population. The city has a sizable, established Lebanese population with a long history in local business and government.

There were 45,199 households, out of which 29.0% had children under the age of 18 living with them, 41.6% were married couples living together, 15.5% had a female householder with no husband present, and 39.5% were non-families. Individuals made up 33.2% of all households, and 11.7% had someone living alone who was 65 years of age or older. The average household size was 2.39 and the average family size was 3.04.

The age distribution of city population was the following: 25.7% under the age of 18, 12.0% from 18 to 24, 27.2% from 25 to 44, 20.8% from 45 to 64, and 14.2% who were 65 years of age or older. The median age was 34 years. For every 100 females, there were 89.9 males. For every 100 females age 18 and over, there were 85.0 males. The median income for a household in the city was $36,397. The per capita income for the city was $20,512. Some 18.8% of the population was below the poverty line.

== Economy ==
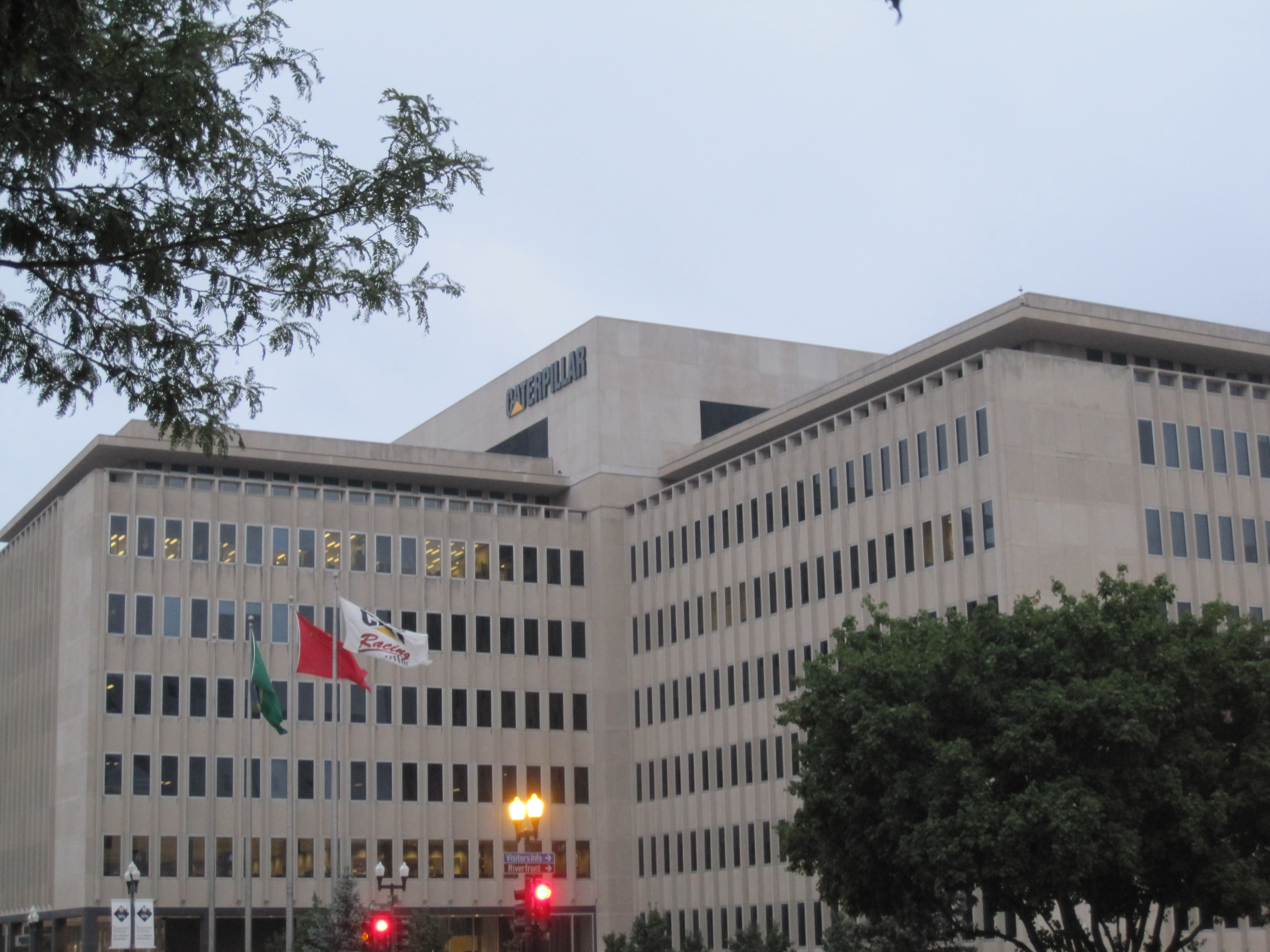
The former headquarters of Caterpillar Inc., now the Caterpillar Administration Building

=== Industry ===
Peoria's first major industry was started in 1830 by John Hamlin and John Sharp, who constructed the flour mill on Kickapoo Creek. In 1837, another industry was begun with E.F. Nowland's pork packing industry. Many other industries started slowly in Peoria including carriage factories, pottery makers, wholesale warehousing, casting foundries, glucose factories, ice harvesting, and furniture makers. Peoria became the first world leader for distilleries thanks to Andrew Eitle (1837), Almiron S. Cole (1844), and Joseph B. Greenhut. Between 1837 and 1919, Peoria held over 24 distilleries and 73 breweries. Together, they produced the highest amount of internal revenue tax on alcohol (also known as 'Sin Tax') of any single revenue district in the entire United States; as much as 50% of tax revenue during the Civil War came from Peoria's district, largely due to distilleries and breweries. Peoria also was one of the major bootlegging areas during Prohibition and home to the famed mobsters, the Shelton brothers. That great success placed Peoria into a building boom of beautiful private homes, schools, parks, churches, as well as municipal buildings.

In addition to the distilleries came farm machinery manufacturing by William Nurse in 1837. Also, two men called Toby and Anderson brought the steel plow circa 1843, which gained immediate success. The dominant manufacturing companies in Peoria were Kingman Plow Co., Acme Harvester Co., Selby, Starr & Co., and Avery Manufacturing Co. In 1889, Keystone Steel & Wire developed the first wire fence and has since been the nation's leading manufacturer.

Around the 1880s, businesses such as Rouse Hazard Co. in Peoria, were dealers and importers of bicycles and accessories worldwide. Charles Duryea, one of the cycle manufacturers, developed the first commercially available gasoline-powered automobile in the U.S. in 1893. At the time agricultural implement production declined, which led the earth moving and tractor equipment companies to skyrocket and make Peoria in this field the world leader. In 1925, Caterpillar Tractor Co. was formed from California-based companies, Benjamin Holt Co. and the C.L. Best Tractor Co. Robert G. LeTourneau's earth moving company began its production of new scrapers and dozers in 1935, which evolved into Komatsu-Dresser, Haulpak Division. Today, the joint venture between Komatsu and Dresser Industries has long since passed; Komatsu bought out Dresser in 1996. The entity that remains is the off-highway truck manufacturing division for Komatsu America Corporation. In September 2024, Komatsu Limited announced that it was "enhancing its Peoria operations by constructing a new office building that will provide a collaborative space for engineering, sales, manufacturing, management and other functions." The new building is planned to be completed by the end of 2025.

The world headquarters for Caterpillar Inc. was based in Peoria for over 110 years until the company announced it was moving to Deerfield, Illinois in late-2017. It still remains a significant economic driver in the city, and is the second-biggest employer in the city of Peoria.

Health care has become a major part of Peoria's economy. Peoria was ranked as the sixth midsize healthcare hub in the country by Business Facilities in 2021.

Since 2021, OSF HealthCare has been the city's top employer, rising from fourth in 2014. Headquartered in Peoria since its founding in 1877, and it relocated its headquarters to a newly renovated building in downtown Peoria in 2022. In February 2024, OSF Healthcare opened the $250 million OSF HealthCare Cancer Institute. It also includes the Children's Hospital of Illinois.

In 2023, Carle Health finalized a deal to purchase Methodist and Proctor Hospitals from UnityPoint. It is currently the third-biggest employer in the city, behind OSF HealthCare and Caterpillar Inc.

In addition to the three major hospitals, the USDA's National Center for Agricultural Utilization Research, formerly called the USDA Northern Regional Research Lab, is located in Peoria. This is one of the labs where mass production of penicillin was developed.

=== Retail ===
Northwoods Mall is the largest shopping mall in both Peoria and the Tri-County area. Other retail centers include The Shoppes at Grand Prairie, Junction City Shopping Center, Campustown Shopping Center, Sheridan Village, Metro Centre, Willow Knolls Court, and Westlake Shopping Center.

=== Businesses ===
Renaissance Park was originally designated as a research park, originally established in May 2003 as the Peoria Medical and Technology District. It consisted of nine residential neighborhoods, Bradley University, the medical district, and the National Center for Agricultural Utilization Research. The Peoria NEXT Innovation Center opened in August 2007 and provides both dry and wet labs, as well as conference and office space for emerging start-up companies. Over $2 billion in research is conducted in Peoria annually. While the Renaissance Park research park project never came to full fruition, many of the original ideas from the original Renaissance Park concept still continue on a smaller level via The Renaissance Park Community Association.

Businesses in Peoria with significant presence include:

- Caterpillar (until 2017 when its headquarters (approximately 300 positions) moved to Deerfield, Illinois, and then to Irving, Texas in 2022): Heavy equipment and engine manufacturer. Caterpillar still maintains a large working force in the area in management, marketing, IT, engineering and labor union manufacturing, as well as other positions.
- CEFCU: Credit union; started by Caterpillar employees; now serves residents of 14 counties in Central Illinois and 3 in California
- Komatsu America Corporation: World's second-largest mining equipment manufacturer has a large manufacturing facility in Peoria
- Maui Jim: Sunglasses manufacturer headquarters, a subsidiary (as of 2022) of the French company Kering Eyewear.
- National Center for Agricultural Utilization Research: Largest USDA research facility; one of the facilities where mass production of penicillin was improved
- OSF Healthcare, which operates OSF Saint Francis Medical Center
- RLI Corp. (World Headquarters): Specialty insurance company.
- Carle Health: Operates two hospitals in the city.

=== Top employers ===
According to the city's 2023 Annual Comprehensive Financial Report, the top employers in the city are:

#	Employer	# of Employees
1	OSF Saint Francis Medical Center	13,500
2	Caterpillar Inc	12,000
3	Carle Health	4,991
4	Peoria Public Schools District 150	2,668
5	Bradley University	1,300
6	Advanced Technology Services	1,073
7	Supply Chain (SC2)	1,030
8	Liberty Steel & Wire	912
9	Citizens Equity First Credit Union	867
10	City of Peoria	695

== Arts and culture ==
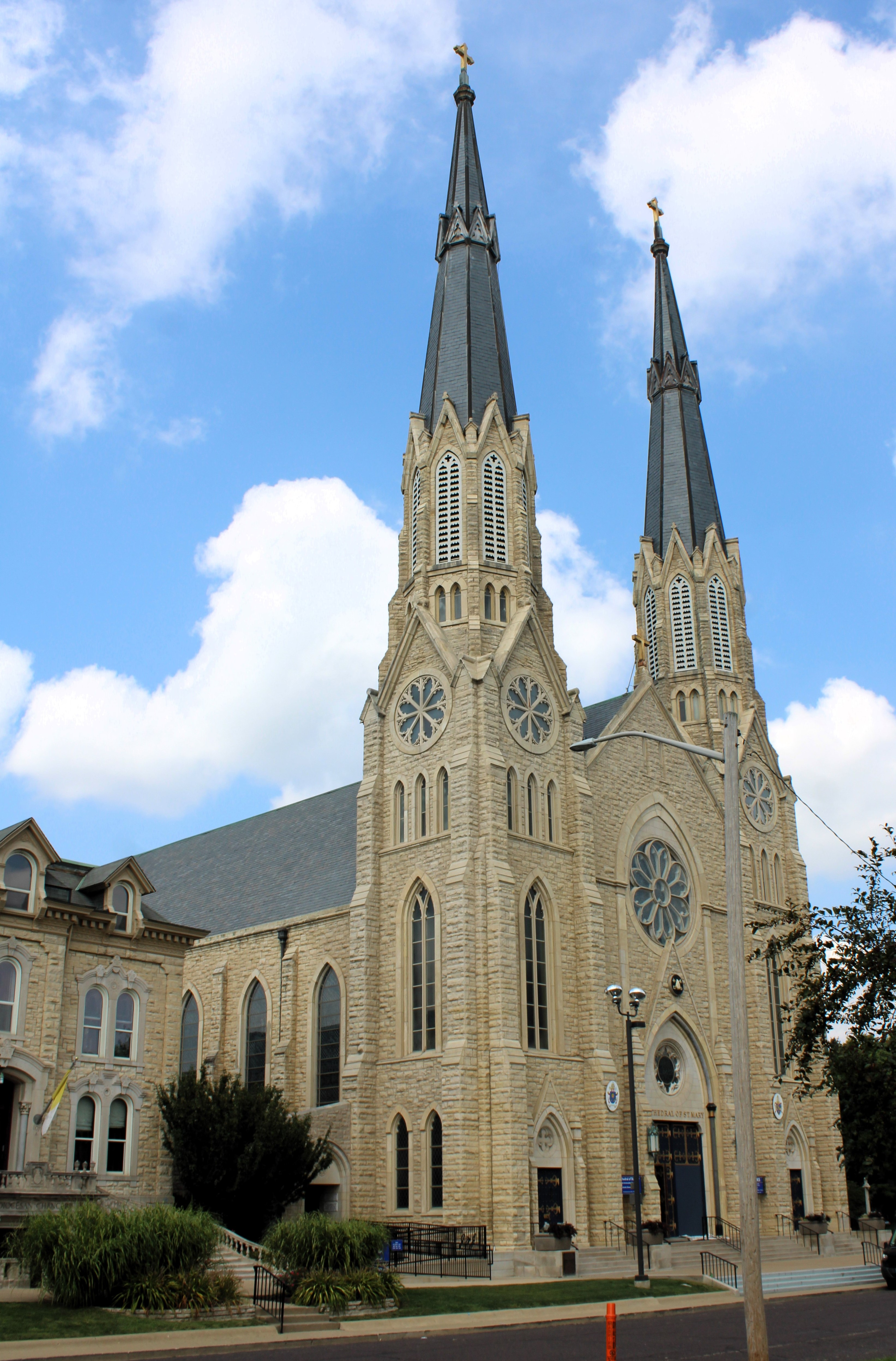
Cathedral of Saint Mary of the Immaculate Conception

=== Museums ===
Museums in Peoria include the Pettengill-Morron House, the John C Flanagan House of the Peoria Historical Society, and the Wheels o' Time Museum. The Museum Block, opened on October 12, 2012, houses the Peoria Riverfront Museum and the Caterpillar World Visitors Center.

The Museum Block, also known as Museum Square, is a $100+ million project that contains the Peoria Riverfront Museum and The Caterpillar Experience, a museum and visitor center showcasing Caterpillar past, present, and future. It is located in downtown Peoria along the Illinois River at the site formerly known as the Sears Block or Washington Square. The Block broke ground on September 7, 2010 and opened in October 2012. The Peoria PlayHouse Children's Museum opened in June 2015 in the Glen Oak Pavilion.

=== Festivals ===
The Heart of Illinois Fair was established in 1949 and has run annually since. The Steamboat Classic, held every summer, is the world's largest four-mile (6 km) running race and draws international runners. The Peoria Santa Claus Parade, which started in 1888, is the oldest running holiday parade in the United States.

The Peoria Art Guild, in partnership with the Peoria Park District, hosts the Annual Art Fair, which is continually rated as one of the 100 top art fairs in the nation. The Peoria Park District also partners with a variety of organizations to annually host Fiesta en el Rio, Peoria Irish Fest, River City Soul Fest and Gospel Fest, India Fest, Peoria Irish Fest, and Oktoberfest.

=== Performing arts ===
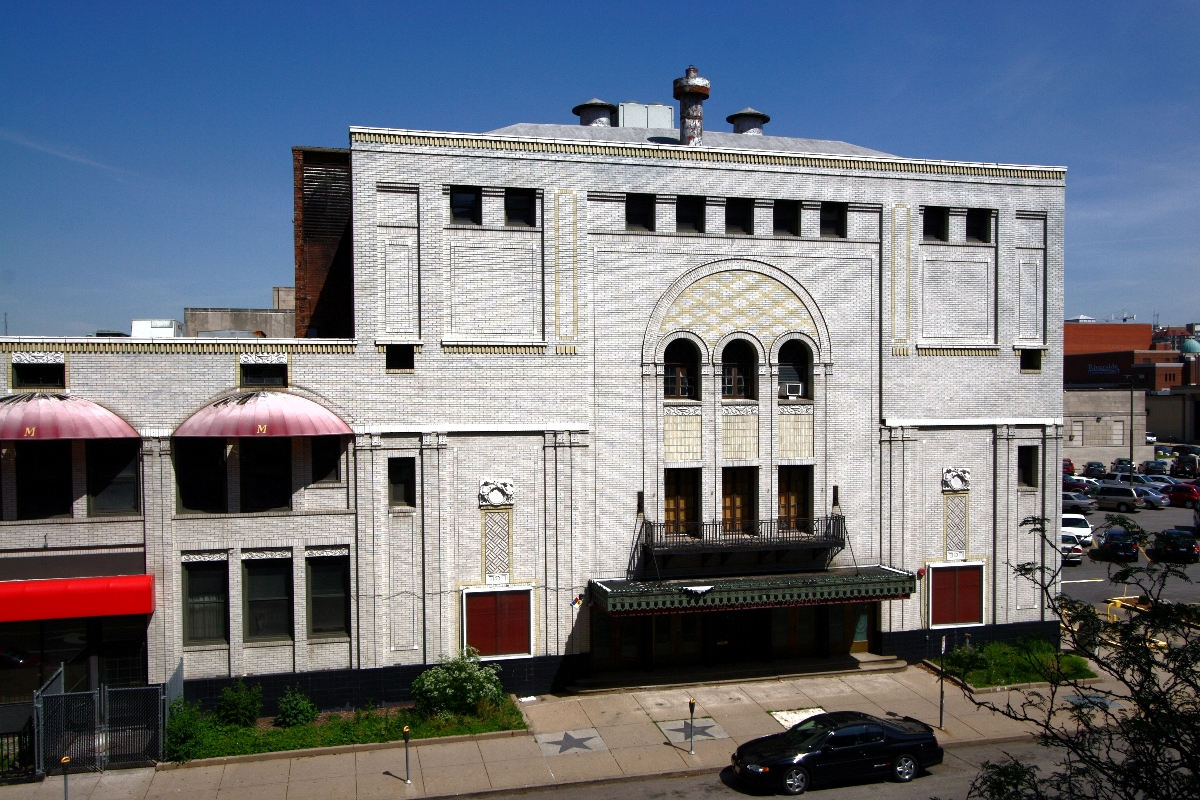
Madison Theatre

The Peoria Symphony Orchestra is the 14th oldest in the nation. Peoria is also home to the Peoria Municipal Band, the Peoria Area Civic Chorale, the Youth Music Illinois (formerly known as Central Illinois Youth Symphony), Central Illinois Ballet, and the Peoria Ballet. Several community and professional theaters have their home in and around Peoria, including the Peoria Players, which is the fourth-oldest community theater in the nation and the oldest in Illinois. Corn Stock Theatre is another community theater company in Peoria, and is the only outdoor theater company in Central Illinois.

Peoria has hosted the Heart of Illinois Fair every year since 1949. The fair features livestock competitions, rides, concessions, motor contests, and concerts.

=== Civic Center ===
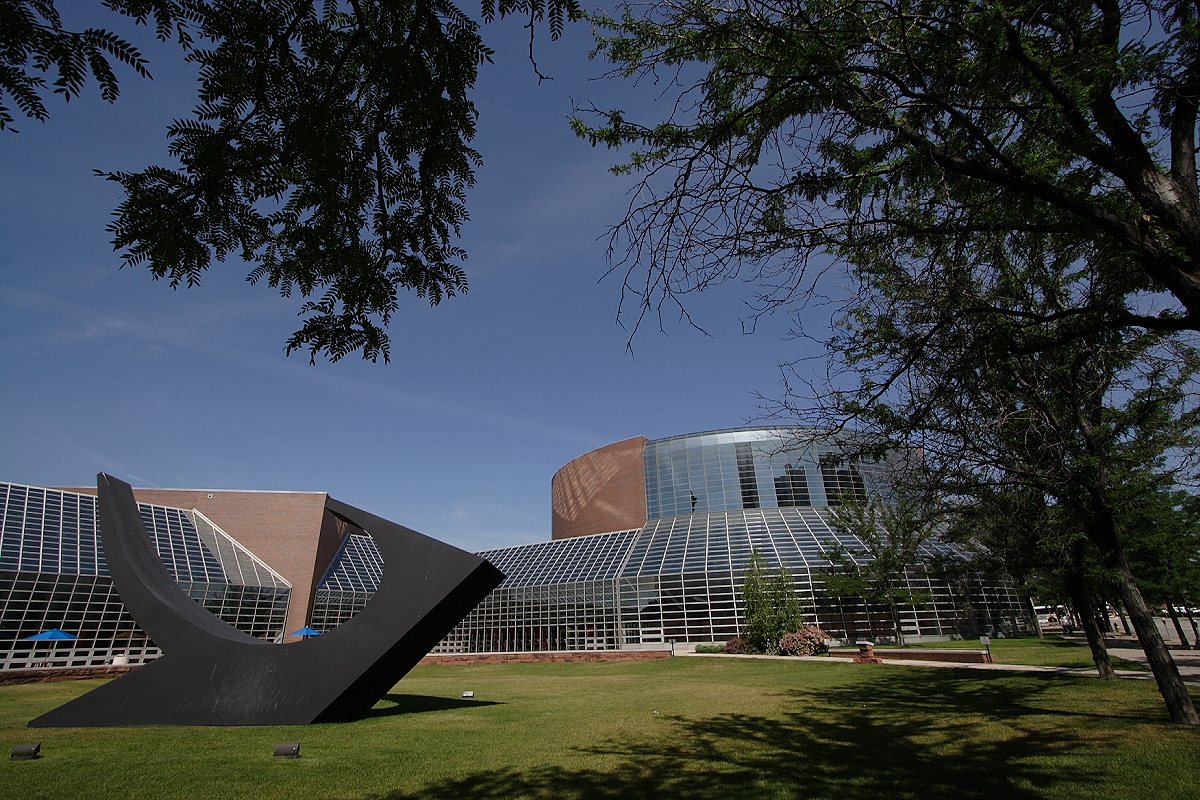
Peoria Civic Center

The Peoria Civic Center includes an arena, convention center, and theater, and opened June 6, 1982, was designed by the famed late architect Philip Johnson. It completed a $55 million renovation and expansion by 2007.

The Hotel Pere Marquette finished renovations in 2013 with a skyway linking to the Peoria Civic Center. A new 10-story Courtyard has been built adjacent to this hotel, completing a hotel campus for larger conventions. The Civic Center hosts a variety of events in its arena, convention center, and theatre, including Bradley Braves men's basketball, Peoria Rivermen (SPHL), the IHSA State Chess Championship. Which claims to be the largest chess team tournament in the United States: Beginning in 2018, the teams were narrowed to 128 by the use of sectional elimination competitions, and as of 2018 the tournament has about 1500 players, including up to 8 players and 4 alternates per team.

=== Library ===
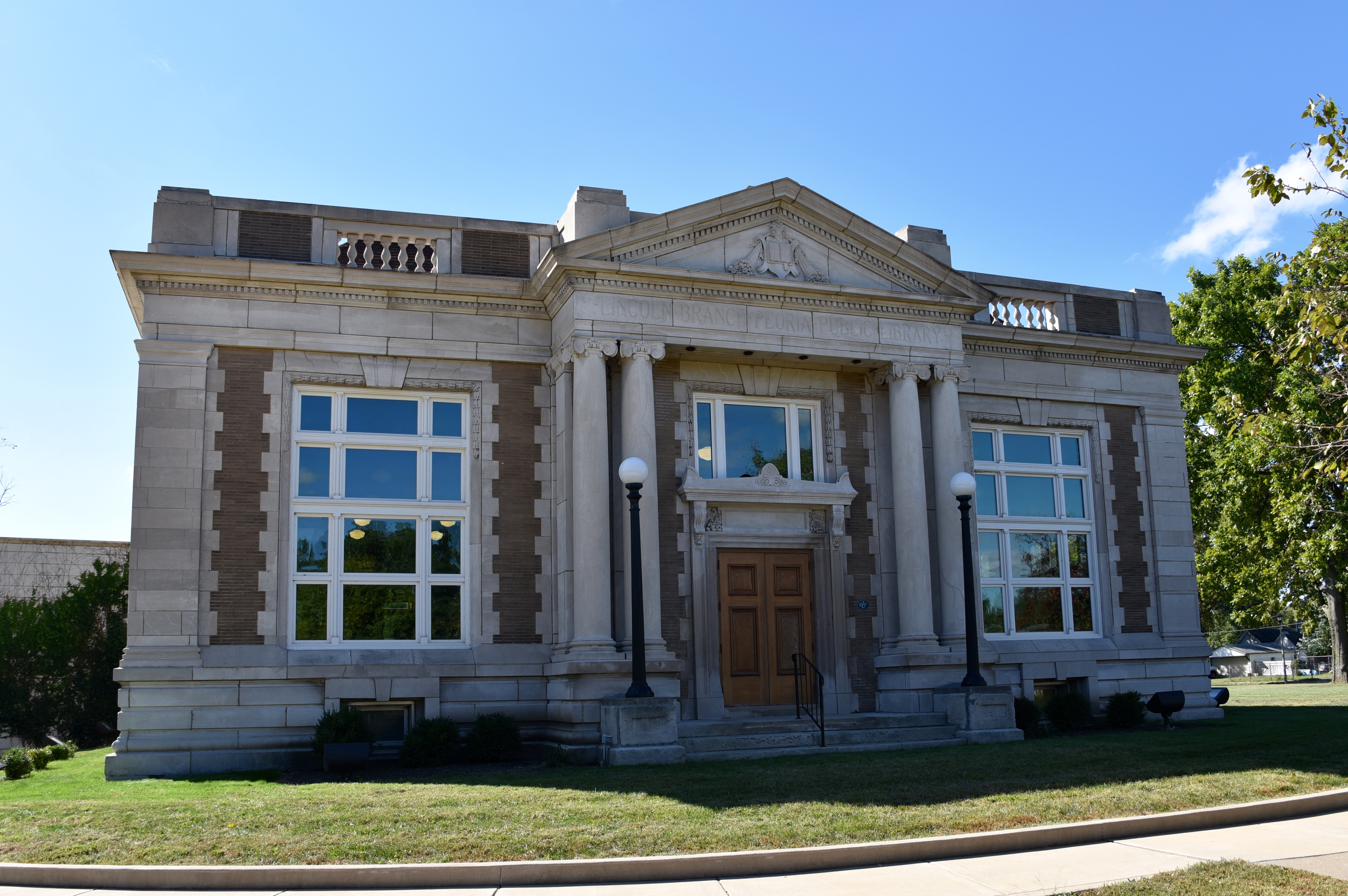
Lincoln Branch Peoria Public Library, a Carnegie library

Library services in Peoria originated in 1855 with two rival libraries, the Peoria Mercantile Library and the Peoria Library, which consolidated in 1856 as the Peoria City Library, and contained over 1,500 volumes. The Peoria Public Library has five locations, including the Main Library in downtown Peoria, the Lincoln Branch, a Carnegie library opened in 1911, the Lakeview Branch, McClure Branch, and North Branch.

=== Registered historic places ===
- Central National Bank Building
- Cumberland Presbyterian Church
- Grand Army of the Republic Memorial Hall
- Grandview Drive
- International Harvester Building
- John C. Proctor Recreation Center
- Judge Flanagan Residence
- Judge Jacob Gale House
- Madison Theatre
- North Side Historic District
- Peace and Harvest
- Peoria City Hall
- Peoria Cordage Company
- Peoria Mineral Springs
- Peoria Waterworks
- Pere Marquette Hotel
- Pettingill-Morron House
- Rock Island Depot and Freight House
- Springdale Cemetery
- West Bluff Historic District
- A. Lucas & Sons

== Sports ==
Club	League	Sport	Venue	Established	Championships
Peoria Chiefs	Midwest League	Baseball	Dozer Park	1983	1 (2002)
Peoria Rivermen	SPHL	Ice Hockey	Carver Arena	1982	5 (1985, 1991, 2000, 2022, 2024)
Peoria Mustangs	NA3HL	Ice Hockey	Owens Center	2000	0
Peoria City	USL League Two	Association football	Shea Stadium (Peoria, Illinois)	2020	0
Peoria Piggies (Rugby Football Club)	D4 Midwest League	Rugby	Catholic Charities	1958	0
Peoria Bootleggers		Rugby			
Peoria Prowlers		Roller Derby		2019	
Bradley Braves men's basketball	Missouri Valley	Basketball	Carver Arena	1902	
Bradley Braves baseball	Missouri Valley	Baseball	Dozer Park	1898	

=== Former sports teams ===
Club	League	Sport	Venue	Established	Dissolved
Peoria Distillers	Multiple	Baseball	Lake View Park	1894	1917
Caterpillar Diesels	Amateur Athletic Union	Basketball	Peoria Armory Robertson Field House	1937	1960
Peoria Redwings	All-American Girls Professional Baseball League	Baseball	Peoria Stadium	1946	1951
Peoria Push Roller Derby	WFTDA Apprentice League	Roller Derby	Expo Gardens	2010	2016

== Parks and recreation ==
Grandview Drive, which Theodore Roosevelt purportedly called the "world's most beautiful drive" during a 1910 visit, runs through both Peoria and Peoria Heights. In addition to Grandview Drive, the Peoria Park District contains 9,000 acres (36 km^{2}) of parks and trails, making it the largest park system in Illinois. The Illinois River Bluff Trail connects four Peoria Park District parks: Camp Wokanda, Robinson Park, Green Valley Camp, and Detweiller Park; the Rock Island Greenway (13 miles) connects the State of Illinois Rock Island trail traveling north to Toulon, IL and also connects southeast to East Peoria, IL and to the Morton Community Bikeway. Other parks include the Forest Park Nature Center, which features seven miles of hiking trails through prairie openings and forested woodlands, Glen Oak Park, and Bradley Park, which features disc golf as well as a dog park. Peoria has five public golf courses, as well as several private and semi-private golf courses. The Peoria Park District, the first and still largest park district in Illinois, was the 2001 Winner of the National Gold Medal Award for Excellence in Parks and Recreation for Class II Parks.

Various cultural institutions are located in Glen Oak Park. The Peoria Zoo, formerly Glen Oak Zoo, was expanded and refurbished in recent years. Finished in 2009, the new zoo improvements more than triple the size of the zoo and feature a major African safari exhibit. Luthy Garden, established in 1951, is 5 acres (2.0 ha) and offers over a dozen theme gardens and a Conservatory.

== Government ==
Peoria is a home rule municipality with a mayor and ten city council members, operating under a council-manager form of government. The city is divided into five districts, each of which elects one member using first-past-the-post (FPTP). Additionally, five council members are elected at-large using the equal-and-even variant of cumulative voting, also known as satisfaction approval voting, with the number of candidates a voter may vote for restricted to five, the number of seats up for election.

Elected officials
Office	Office holder
Mayor	Rita Ali
City Council Member – District 1	Denise Jackson
City Council Member – District 2	Chuck Grayeb
City Council Member – District 3	Timothy Riggenbach
City Council Member – District 4	Andre Allen
City Council Member – District 5	Denis Cyr
City Council Member – At Large	Kiran Velpula
City Council Member – At Large	Zachary M. Oyler
City Council Member – At Large	Mike Vespa
City Council Member – At Large	Bernice Gordon-Young
City Council Member – At Large	John L. Kelly
City/Township Clerk	Stefanie Tarr
City Treasurer/Township Collector	Chet Tomczyk
Township Supervisor	LaTrina Leary
Township Assessor	Max Schlafley

=== Township of the City of Peoria ===
Outline of the Township of the City of Peoria in Peoria County

The Township of the City of Peoria (also City of Peoria Township) is a separate government from the City of Peoria, and performs the functions of civil township government in most of the city. In 1907, the township was created by the Peoria County Board to match the boundaries of the City of Peoria, which until then had overlapped portions of Peoria Township (now West Peoria Township) and Richwoods Township. The border of the township grew with the Peoria city limits until 1990, when it was frozen at its current boundaries, containing about 53 sq mi (140 km^{2}); the City of Peoria itself has continued expanding outside the City of Peoria Township borders into Kickapoo, Medina, and Radnor townships. In the years before the freeze, the Township of the City of Peoria had grown to take up most of the former area of Richwoods and what is now West Peoria Township.

This township has the following neighborhoods:

- Averyville*
- Center Bluff
- Central Peoria
- Downtown
- East Bluff
- El Vista*
- Glen Oak-Flanagan Historic District
- Goose Lake
- Grandview Drive
- Heart of Peoria
- Moss-Bradley
- North Valley
- Northwest Peoria
- Randolph-Roanoke Historic District
- University East
- The Uplands
- West Bluff

* - unincorporated towns that were assimilated by the City of Peoria.

== Education ==
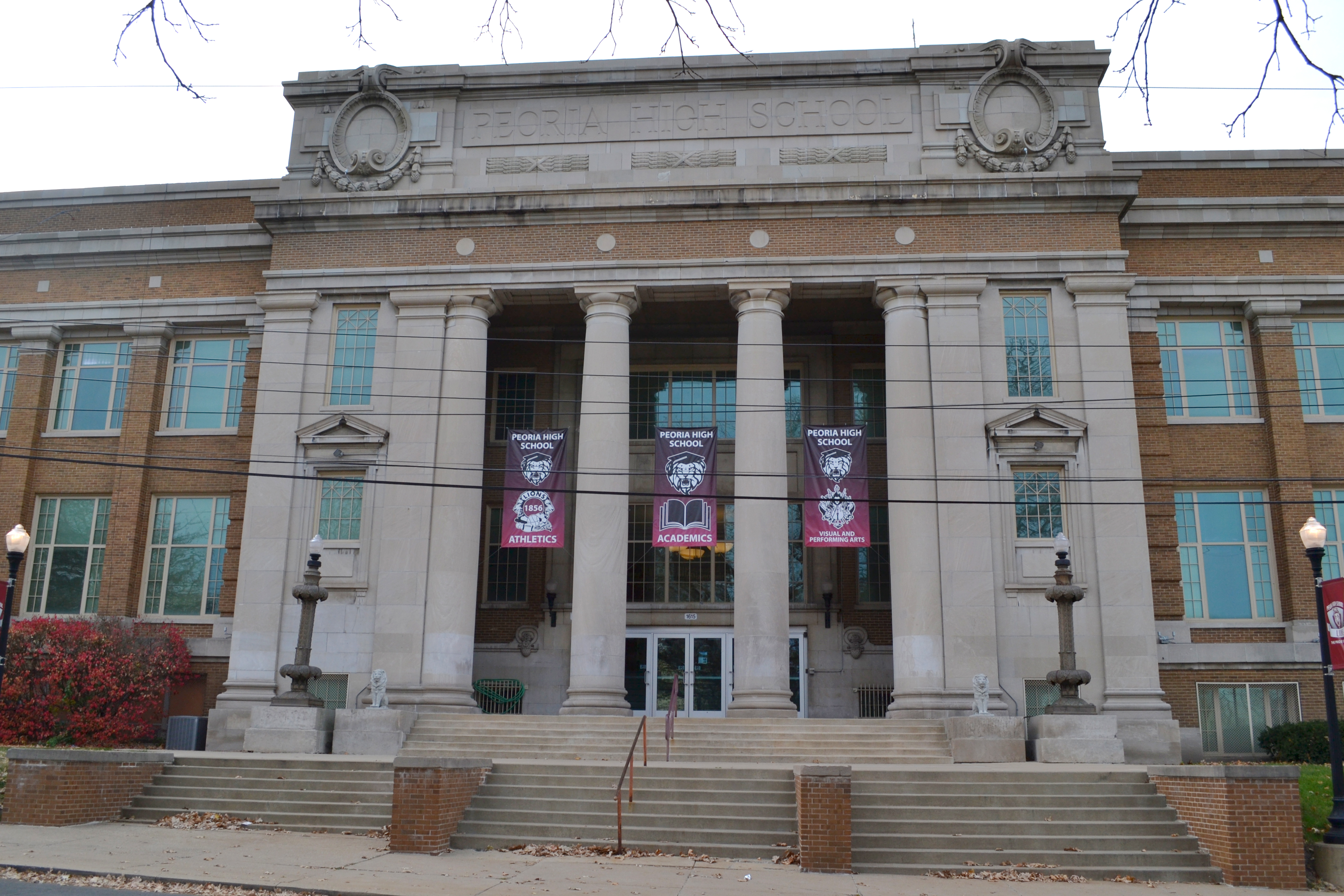
Peoria High School

Peoria is divided between several public K-12 school districts:

- Peoria Public Schools District 150 is the largest and serves the majority of the city. District 150 schools include dozens of primary and middle schools, as well as three public high schools: Richwoods High School, which hosts the competitive International Baccalaureate Program of study; Manual High School; and Peoria High School (Central), the oldest high school in Illinois. At the end of the 2009–2010 school year, a fourth high school, Woodruff High School, closed. Reservoir Gifted School, one of the middle schools in the district, was ranked #5 of all middle schools in Illinois in 2025.
- Dunlap Community Unit School District 323 serves the far north and northwest parts of Peoria, that were mostly outside the city before the 1990s. Dunlap schools have Dunlap High School, 2 Middle Schools and 5 Elementary schools.
- Pleasant Valley School District 62 includes a part of western Peoria.
- Limestone Community High School District 310 serves a small portion of the western edge of the City of Peoria (western edges of Wardcliffe and Lexington Hills areas), but mainly serves the suburbs of Bartonville, Bellevue and surrounding towns.
- Peoria Heights Community Unit School District 325 serves the suburb of Peoria Heights; however, parts of the City of Peoria immediately outside the Heights are in this school district.
- Illinois Valley Central Unit School District 321 includes parts of northeast Peoria
- Peoria was also served by Quest Charter Academy, a STEM focused school serving grades 5–12, until the charter school closed its doors at the conclusion of the 2024 school year.

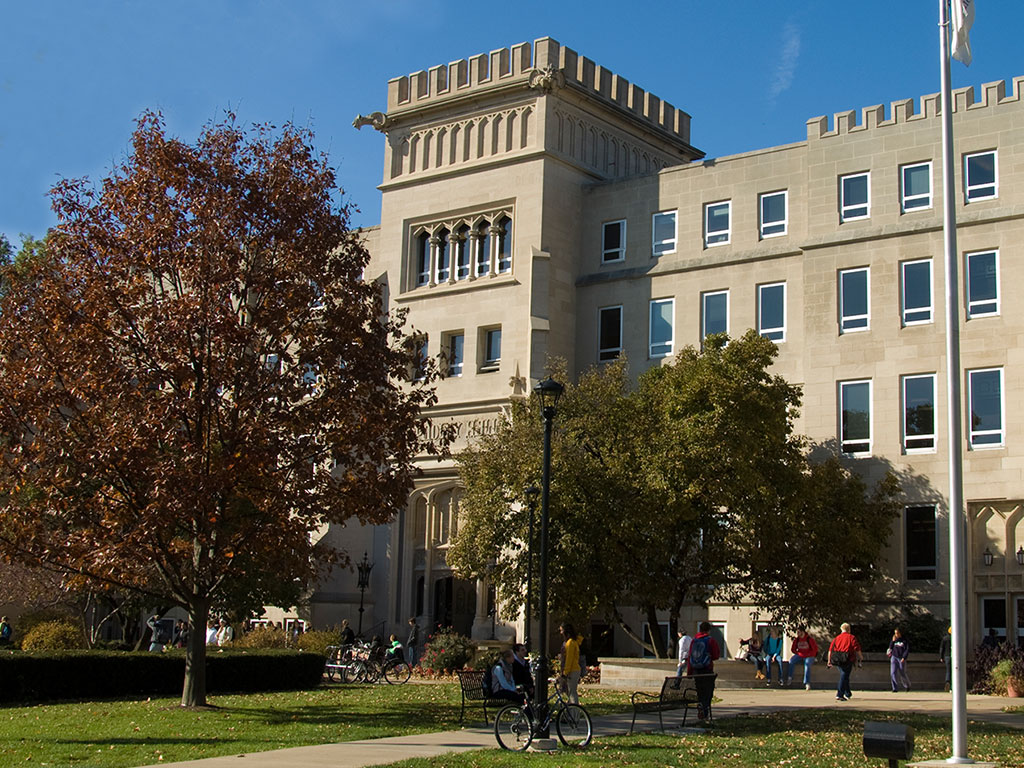
Bradley Hall at Bradley University

The Roman Catholic Diocese of Peoria runs six schools in the city: five grade schools and Peoria Notre Dame High School. Non-denominational Peoria Christian School operates a grade school, middle school, and high school. In addition, Concordia Lutheran School, Peoria Academy, Christ Lutheran School, Peoria Hebrew Day School, and several smaller private schools exist.

Bradley University, Methodist College, OSF St. Francis College of Nursing, the University of Illinois College of Medicine at Peoria, and the north campus of Illinois Central College are based in the city. The former Peoria campus of Roosevelt University is now closed. Additionally, Eureka College and the main campus of Illinois Central College are located nearby in Eureka and East Peoria, respectively.

== Media ==
As of 2024 Nielsen ratings, Peoria is the 157th largest radio market in the United States and Peoria-Bloomington is the 122nd largest television market in the United States.

The area has 14 commercial radio stations with six owners among them; four non-commercial full-power radio stations, each separately owned; five commercial television stations with two operating owners among them; one non-commercial television station; and one daily newspaper (Peoria Journal Star).

=== NOAA Weather Radio ===
NOAA Weather Radio station WXJ71 transmits from East Peoria and is licensed to NOAA's National Weather Service Central Illinois Weather Forecast Office at Lincoln, broadcasting on a frequency of 162.475 mHz (channel 4 on most newer weather radios, and most SAME weather radios). The station activates the SAME tone alarm feature and a 1050 Hz tone activating older radios (except for AMBER Alerts, using the SAME feature only) for hazardous weather and non-weather warnings and emergencies, along with selected weather watches, for the Illinois counties of Fulton, Knox, Marshall, Mason, McLean, Peoria, Stark, Tazewell, and Woodford. Weather permitting, a tone alarm test of both the SAME and 1050 Hz tone features are conducted every Wednesday between 11 AM and noon.

== Infrastructure ==
=== Health and medicine ===
The health-care industry accounts for at least 25% of Peoria's economy. The city has three major hospitals: OSF Saint Francis Medical Center (the area's Level I adult trauma center), Carle Health Peoria – Methodist (a level II adult trauma center), and Carle Health Peoria – Proctor. In addition, the Children's Hospital of Illinois (a part of OSF Saint Francis, and the area's Level I pediatric trauma center), the University of Illinois College of Medicine at Peoria, and the Midwest Affiliate of St. Jude Children's Research Hospital are located in the city. The hospitals are all located in a medical district around the junction of Interstate 74 and Knoxville Avenue, adjacent to downtown in the southeast of the city, except for Carle Health Peoria – Proctor, which is in the geographic center of the city. The surrounding towns are also supported by Carle Health Peoria - Pekin Hospital in Pekin, Illinois, Advocate Eureka Hospital in Eureka, Illinois, and the Hopedale Medical Complex Hospital and Nursing Home in Hopedale, Illinois. The Institute of Physical Medicine and Rehabilitation was created from the "Peoria Plan for Human Rehabilitation," a model for medical and occupational rehabilitation launched in 1943 to integrate returning World War II veterans back into the workplace.

=== Transportation ===
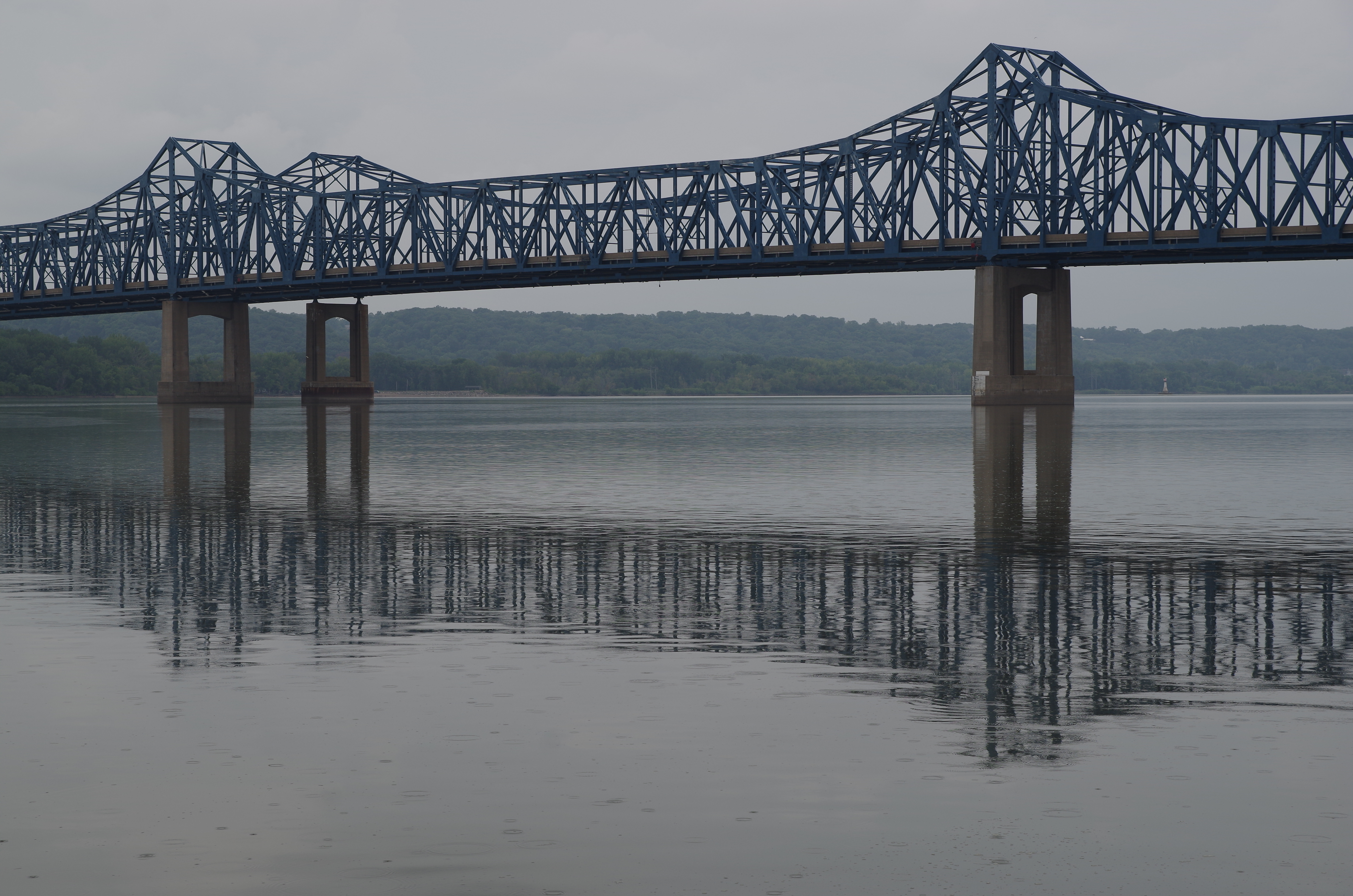
The twin steel truss bridges known as McClugage Bridge, spanning the Illinois River at Peoria

==== Interstate and U.S. routes ====
The Peoria area is served by three Interstate highways: Interstate 74, which runs from northwest to southeast through the downtown area, Interstate 474, a southern bypass of I-74 through portions of Peoria and the suburbs of Bartonville and Creve Coeur, and Interstate 155, which runs south from I-74 in Morton to Interstate 55 in Lincoln which connects to Springfield and St. Louis. I-74 crosses over the Illinois River via the Murray Baker Bridge, while I-474 crosses via the Shade-Lohmann Bridge. The nearest metropolitan centers accessible on I-74 are the Quad Cities to the west, and Bloomington-Normal to the east.

From 2004 to 2006, Interstate 74 between Interstate 474 on the west and Illinois Route 8 on the east was reconstructed as part of the Upgrade 74 project. In addition, U.S. Route 150 serves as the main arterial for the northern portion of the Peoria area, becoming War Memorial Drive before heading west towards Kickapoo. It enters from the McClugage Bridge; east of the bridge, then runs southeast to Morton. U.S. Route 24 runs concurrently with Interstate 474 in the southwest portion of the city.

==== State routes ====
The following state routes run through Peoria:

- Illinois Route 6 runs along the northwestern portion of the city as an extension of I-474. It is a four-lane freeway that runs from the I-74/474 intersection northeast to Illinois Route 29 south of Chillicothe. It is marked as a north–south road.
- Illinois Route 8 roughly parallels I-74 to the south. It enters Peoria from Elmwood and runs southeast through the city, passing just southwest of the downtown area. Illinois 8 crosses into East Peoria via the Cedar Street Bridge with 116. Illinois 8 is marked as an east–west road.
- Illinois Route 29 runs through Peoria along the Illinois River from Chillicothe through downtown Peoria. It then joins Interstate 74 across the Murray Baker Bridge. Illinois 29 is marked as a north–south road, and is called Galena Road north of U.S. 150.
- Illinois Route 40 (formerly 88) enters Peoria from the north as Knoxville Avenue. It runs south through the center of the city and exits southeast over the Bob Michel Bridge. Illinois 40 is marked as a north–south road.
- Illinois Route 91 briefly enters Peoria at the intersection with U.S. 150 in the far northwestern portion of the city. Traffic on Illinois 91 mainly accesses The Shoppes at Grand Prairie, or continues to Dunlap.
- Illinois Route 116 enters from the west at Bellevue. It runs directly east and crosses into East Peoria over the Cedar Street Bridge.

The planned Illinois Route 336 project will also connect Illinois 336 with I-474 between Illinois 8 and Illinois 116. Construction on the segment nearest Peoria has not started, nor has funding been allocated.

==== Rail transportation ====
Peoria remains a major freight hub but its minor passenger service has been waning since the 1950s.

Metro Peoria is served by ten common carrier railroads. Four are Class I railroads: BNSF, Canadian National, Norfolk Southern and Union Pacific. The latter has a north–south oriented line which skirts the west edge of the city but a line branches off of it to enter Peoria. One Class II/Regional, Iowa Interstate, serves the city, coming out of Bureau Junction, Illinois. Five Class III/Shortline railroads: Central Illinois Railroad, which operates a portion of the city-owned Peoria, Peoria Heights and Western Railroad; three Genesee & Wyoming-owned operations: Toledo, Peoria & Western Railway, which runs next to US 24 east to Logansport, Indiana (formally owned by Rail America), Illinois & Midland Railroad (the former Chicago & Illinois Midland, comes up from Springfield and Havana) and Tazewell & Peoria Railroad (leases the Peoria & Pekin Union Railway from its owners Canadian National, Norfolk Southern and Union Pacific); Pioneer Railcorp's Keokuk Junction Railway (which now owns the Toledo, Peoria and Western's West End from Lomax and La Harpe in Western Illinois, plus the branch from Keokuk).

Several Midwestern railroads served Peoria Union Station until 1955. The Rock Island Railroad operated trains into its Rock Island Depot until 1978, when it discontinued the Peoria Rocket. East Peoria was served by Amtrak's Prairie Marksman (Chicago–East Peoria) until 1981. Peoria is currently the second largest city in Illinois without passenger rail service; the closest passenger stations are Galesburg (served by Amtrak's Chicago–Los Angeles Southwest Chief) and Bloomington (served by Amtrak's Chicago-St. Louis Lincoln Service). A study of East Peoria–Bloomington passenger rail service was published in 2011. Plans for the proposed service, which would have connected with Amtrak's Lincoln Service at Bloomington, were abandoned due to financial considerations.

A study of Peoria–Chicago passenger rail service was published in July 2022. The study, conducted by IDOT at the request of a Passenger Rail Committee established in August 2021, estimated that startup costs for the proposed service would be $2.54 billion. The service would be operated by Amtrak and would have intermediate stops at LaSalle-Peru, Utica, Ottawa, Morris, and Joliet. The trip between Peoria and Chicago would take about 2 1/2 hours. Committee members, who met with federal transportation officials and Amtrak's CEO, were hopeful about securing funding.

==== Public transportation ====
Public bus service is provided by the Greater Peoria Mass Transit District, which operates 17 bus routes under the name CityLink that serve the city, Illinois Central College, and much of East Peoria, Peoria Heights, West Peoria in addition to points between Peoria and Pekin.

==== Aviation ====
General Wayne A. Downing Peoria International Airport is located west of Peoria. The airport is served by United Express, American Eagle, Allegiant Air, and numerous cargo carriers.

Mount Hawley Auxiliary Airport, on the north end of the city, is a general aviation airport.

== Notable people ==
- Gerald Thomas Bergan, clergyman of the Roman Catholic Church
- Caroline Brown Bourland, Professor & Scholar
- Lydia Moss Bradley, founded Bradley University
- Lester Brockelhurst, serial killer
- Nikki Budzinski, U.S. representative for Illinois
- William Lane Craig, Christian apologist
- Thomas D. Duane, Ophthalmologist who first described valsalva retinopathy in 1972.
- Philip José Farmer, Science Fiction Author
- Dan Fogelberg, Singer & Songwriter
- Betty Friedan, feminist writer and activist
- Jon Ginoli, musician, Pansy Division
- A. J. Guyton, Professional basketball player, graduated from Peoria High School
- Alice Rogers Hager, president, Women's National Press Club
- John Grier Hibben, Philosopher & Educator
- Bruce Johnston, member of the Beach Boys
- Jim Jordan (Fibber McGee), Fibber McGee and Molly radio show
- Marian Jordan (Molly), Fibber McGee and Molly radio show
- Tim Kelley Multi Grammy Award Winning Record Producer, Key To The City of Peoria recipient
- Sam Kinison, actor and comedian
- Raja Krishnamoorthi, U.S. congressman from Illinois
- Darin LaHood, U.S. representative for Illinois
- Tami Lane, Oscar Winning Prosthetic Makeup Artist
- Ralph Lawler, Voice of the NBA's Los Angeles Clippers for 41 years.
- Shaun Livingston, NBA Player & Executive
- Mason McCoy, MLB player San Diego Padres
- Bobby McGrath, pool player
- Sherrick McManis, NFL Football Player
- Bob Michel, U.S. Congressman
- Mudvayne, heavy metal band formed in 1996
- Richard Pryor, stand-up comedian and actor
- Brian Randle (born 1985), basketball player for Maccabi Tel Aviv of the Israeli Basketball Super League
- Gary Richrath, guitarist for REO Speedwagon
- Bob Robinson, Songwriter from the Tim & Bob duo
- Jeff Salzenstein (born 1973), tennis player
- Fulton J. Sheen, Catholic archbishop
- David Sills, former mayor of Irvine, California and son-in-law of President Ronald Reagan
- Dan Simmons, Science Fiction & Horror Writer
- Edward W. Snedeker, Decorated Marine Corps General
- Helen J. Stewart, "first lady of Las Vegas"
- David Ogden Stiers, actor
- Pat Venditte, baseball player
- Greg X. Volz, singer
- Richard A. Whiting, composer
- Tyler Ziegel, US Marine, Recipient of the Purple Heart
- Mike Zimmer, American football coach

== Peoria in popular culture ==
The theme of Peoria as the archetypal example of middle American culture runs throughout American culture, appearing in movies and books, on television and radio, and in countless advertisements as either a filler place name or the representative of mainstream taste, hence the phrase "Will it play in Peoria?"

The 1997 comedy film Peoria Babylon takes place in the city, though it was filmed in Chicago, Illinois.

The 2018 Netflix sitcom Prince of Peoria is set in Peoria, though nothing but establishing shots were filmed there.

== Sister cities ==
Peoria's sister cities include:

- Aitou, Lebanon
- Benxi, China
- Clonmel, Ireland
- Friedrichshafen, Germany

== See also ==
- General American English
- Will it play in Peoria?
- List of places named Peoria
