= John C. Flanagan House Museum =

Historic house in Illinois, United States

- "Judge" Flanagan Residence
- U.S. National Register of Historic Places
- City of Peoria Local Historic Landmark
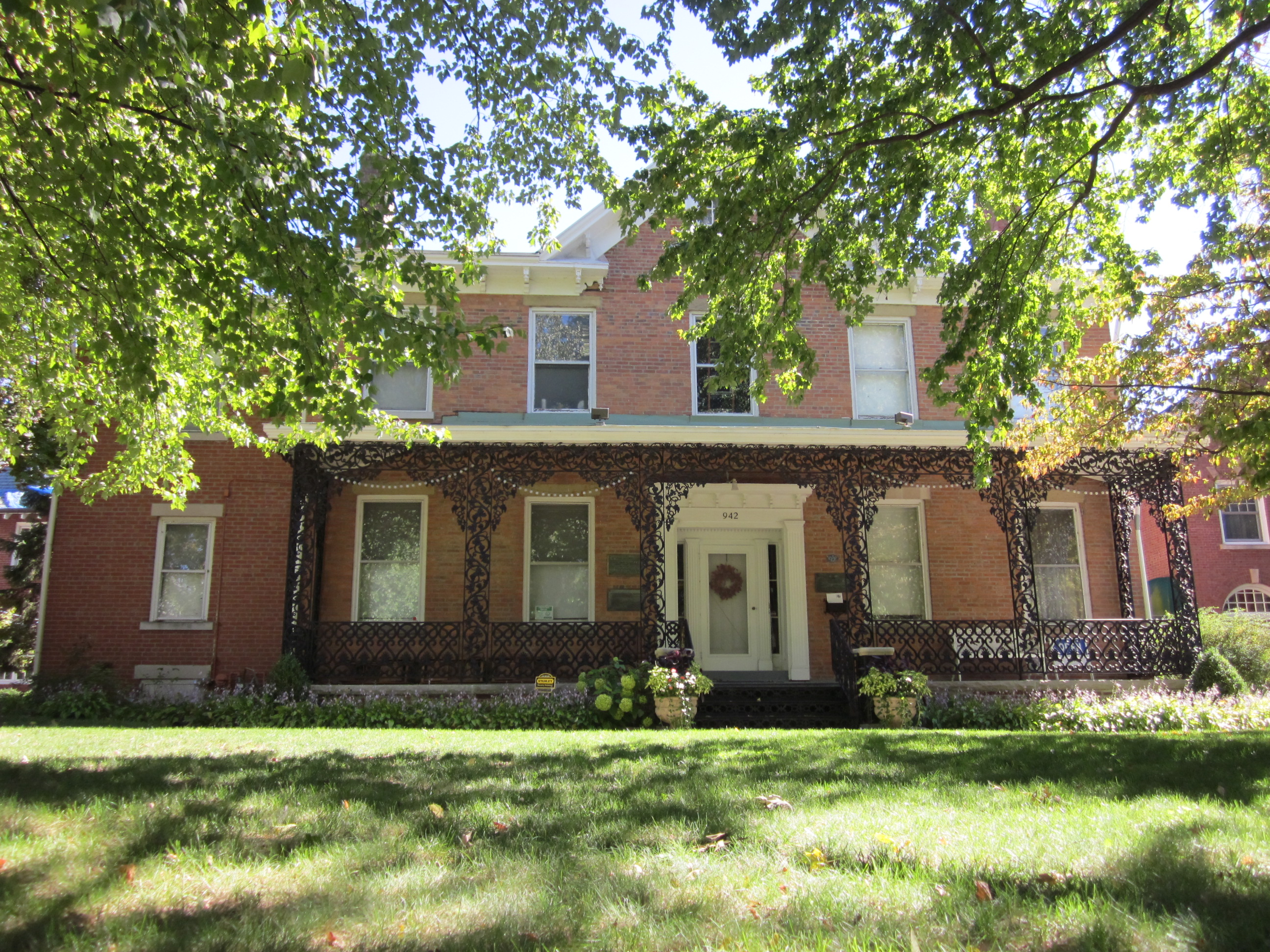

- Location within Peoria County, Illinois
- Location: 942 NE. Glen Oak Ave., Peoria, Illinois
- Coordinates: 40°42′16″N 89°35′08″W
- Area: < 1 acre (0.40 ha)
- Built: 1837
- Architectural style: Post-Colonial, Federal
- NRHP reference No.: 75000670
- Added to NRHP: September 5, 1975

The Judge John C. Flanagan Residence is a historic house in Peoria, Illinois, United States. It was added to the National Register of Historic Places in 1975 and is currently operated as a museum by the Peoria Historical Society.

== History ==
The home was constructed for John C. Flanagan, a Philadelphia native, in 1837. The house was either part of an original 620-acre (250 ha) tract purchased by Flanagan's father or part of a 20-acre (8.1 ha) tract purchased by Flanagan when he came to Peoria in 1831.

The house was built in the post-Colonial or American Federal style with Italianate elements. It is constructed of local walnut timber, locally made brick, and Kickapoo Valley limestone, supplemented with lumber, lime, and glass from Chicago. Ornamental ironwork was shipped from France in 1852. It is the oldest home still standing in Peoria. In 1834, the area only had seven frame houses and about 30 log cabins. The brick mansion overlooks the Illinois River from the East Bluff and was referred to by locals as the "Mansion on the Hill" or "the Manse".

The Peoria Historical Society acquired the property in 1962.

== Legacy ==
It is believed that Abraham Lincoln was once a guest in the home during the Lincoln-Douglas debates from 1854 to 1860. The building was added to the National Register of Historic Places on September 5, 1975. It was also designated as a City of Peoria Local Historic Landmark in November 2022.

The house is now operated by the Peoria Historical Society as the John C. Flanagan House Museum, a 19th-century period historic house museum. The house also serves as the headquarters for the Peoria Chapter of the Daughters of the American Revolution. Exhibits include antique glass, china, furniture, toys, quilts, tools, and clothing.
