= Citizens Equity First Credit Union =

American credit union

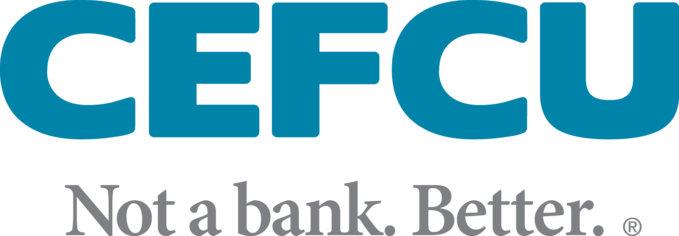
- Type: Credit union
- Industry: Financial services
- Founded: 1937
- Headquarters: Peoria, Illinois, United States
- Number of locations: 32 Member Centers (2022)
- Area served: Illinois, California
- Key people: Angel G. Martinez (Chairman); Matthew J. Mamer (President/CEO); Mark A. Hoffmire (COO)
- Services: Savings; Checking; Consumer Loans; Mortgages; Credit cards; Investments
- Net income: US$48.936 million (2021)
- Number of employees: nearly 1,000 employees
- Subsidiaries: CEFCU Financial Services
- Website: cefcu.com

Citizens Equity First Credit Union is a federally insured credit union based in Peoria, Illinois, commonly referred to by its registered trademark, CEFCU.

CEFCU was founded in 1937 to serve the employees of Caterpillar Tractor Company. It began as Caterpillar Employees Credit Union (CECU) with a state credit union charter, then switched to a federal credit union charter and the name CEFCU (Caterpillar Employees Federal Credit Union). Upon legally separating from Caterpillar, CEFCU changed its acronym to more accurately reflect membership eligibility; first, to "Construction Equipment Federal Credit Union" and, later, to "Citizens Equity Federal Credit Union."

CEFCU returned to an Illinois state credit union charter in 2000, keeping the acronym CEFCU ("Citizens Equity First Credit Union") and maintaining federal deposit ("share") insurance under the National Credit Union Share Insurance Fund. CEFCU membership criteria allow employees of Caterpillar Inc. and Caterpillar dealers, partner companies (those working for about 550 specific companies with a CEFCU relationship), plus individuals who live or work in fourteen central Illinois counties, or who live, work, or worship in three California counties to belong to the credit union.

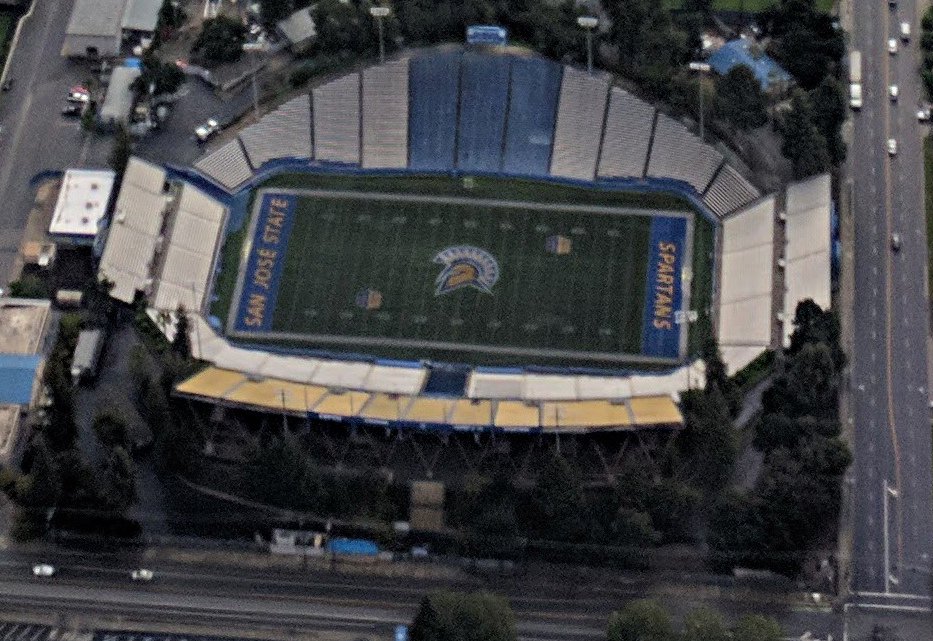
Aerial view of CEFCU Stadium from the southwest, 2017

In August 2016, CEFCU purchased the naming rights to San Jose State University's Spartan Stadium for $8.7 million, renaming it to CEFCU Stadium.

Individuals living or working in the following Illinois counties are eligible for CEFCU membership: Bond, Christian, Clinton, Fulton, Jersey, Knox, Livingston, Logan, McLean, Macon, Macoupin, Madison, Marshall, Mason, McLean, Monroe, Montgomery, Peoria, Putnam, Randolph, Saint Clair, Sangamon, Stark, Tazewell, Washington, and Woodford. The institution now also operates in California, with individuals who live, work or worship in Santa Clara, Alameda and Contra Costa counties eligible to join CEFCU.
