= Peoria Notre Dame High School =

Location
- 5105 North Sheridan Road; Peoria, Illinois 61614; United States; 40°44′58″N 89°36′15″W

Information
- Type: Parochial, College-prep
- Religious affiliation: Roman Catholic
- Established: 1863 (Academy of Our Lady); 1899 (Spalding Institute); 1964 (Bergan High School)
- Oversight: Diocese of Peoria
- Superintendent: Dr. Jerry Sanderson
- Principal: Jacqueline Kelly
- Chaplain: Father Daniel Dionesotes
- Grades: 9–12
- Gender: Coeducational
- Enrollment: 480 (2023-2024)
- Average class size: 19
- Colors: Navy Blue; White; Kelly Green (trim)
- Athletics: IHSA
- Athletics conference: Big Twelve Conference
- Team name: Irish
- Accreditation: North Central Association of Colleges and Schools
- Publication: Gael (literary magazine)
- Newspaper: Acclaim
- Yearbook: Irish Odyssey
- Tuition: Affiliated Parish Student $9,100; Non-Affiliated Student $13,000
- Website: www.peorianotredame.com

Peoria Notre Dame High School is a Catholic parochial high school in Peoria, Illinois. It is the largest school in the Roman Catholic Diocese of Peoria with approximately 815 students. It has a college preparatory curriculum, and according to the school, most of the students graduating in recent years went on to college. The school uses an academy system with a trustee committee, oversight board, pastor's board, president, and principal.

== History ==
Peoria Notre Dame school traces its roots back to 1863, when Father Abram Ryan and seven Sisters of St. Joseph of Carondelet founded a parochial school to educate young Catholic women in Peoria that would become Academy of Our Lady of the Sacred Heart, known usually by the shorter name, Academy of Our Lady. A school for boys would later be established in 1899 and be called Spalding Institute, named for John Lancaster Spalding, the first bishop of the Peoria. The two schools were located across the street from each other and existed as separate schools with separate classes until 1973 when the administrations were merged into Academy of Our Lady/Spalding Institute. The former buildings of the Academy/Spalding campus are contributing properties of the North Side Historic District, located just north of downtown Peoria across Interstate 74.

Bergan High School was established in 1964 in what was then north Peoria near the intersection of Sheridan Road and Glen Avenue. The school was named for Gerald Thomas Bergan, a graduate of Spalding Institute who was serving as Archbishop of Omaha. The school was established as co-ed (though classes were taught segregated by sex), contrary to Spalding and Academy which were separate at the time.

In 1988, Bergan's enrollment had declined to 587 and the diocese, under the direction of Bishop Edward O'Rourke, decided to consolidate the two schools to form Peoria Notre Dame High School. The new school would use Bergan's campus but keep Spalding's mascot as the Fighting Irish. Notre Dame's boys' basketball team used the gymnasium on the former Spalding campus north of downtown Peoria until the 2005-2006 school year. The final game on February 24, 2006 saw over 2,000 people pack into the gym to watch Notre Dame play Peoria-Manual.

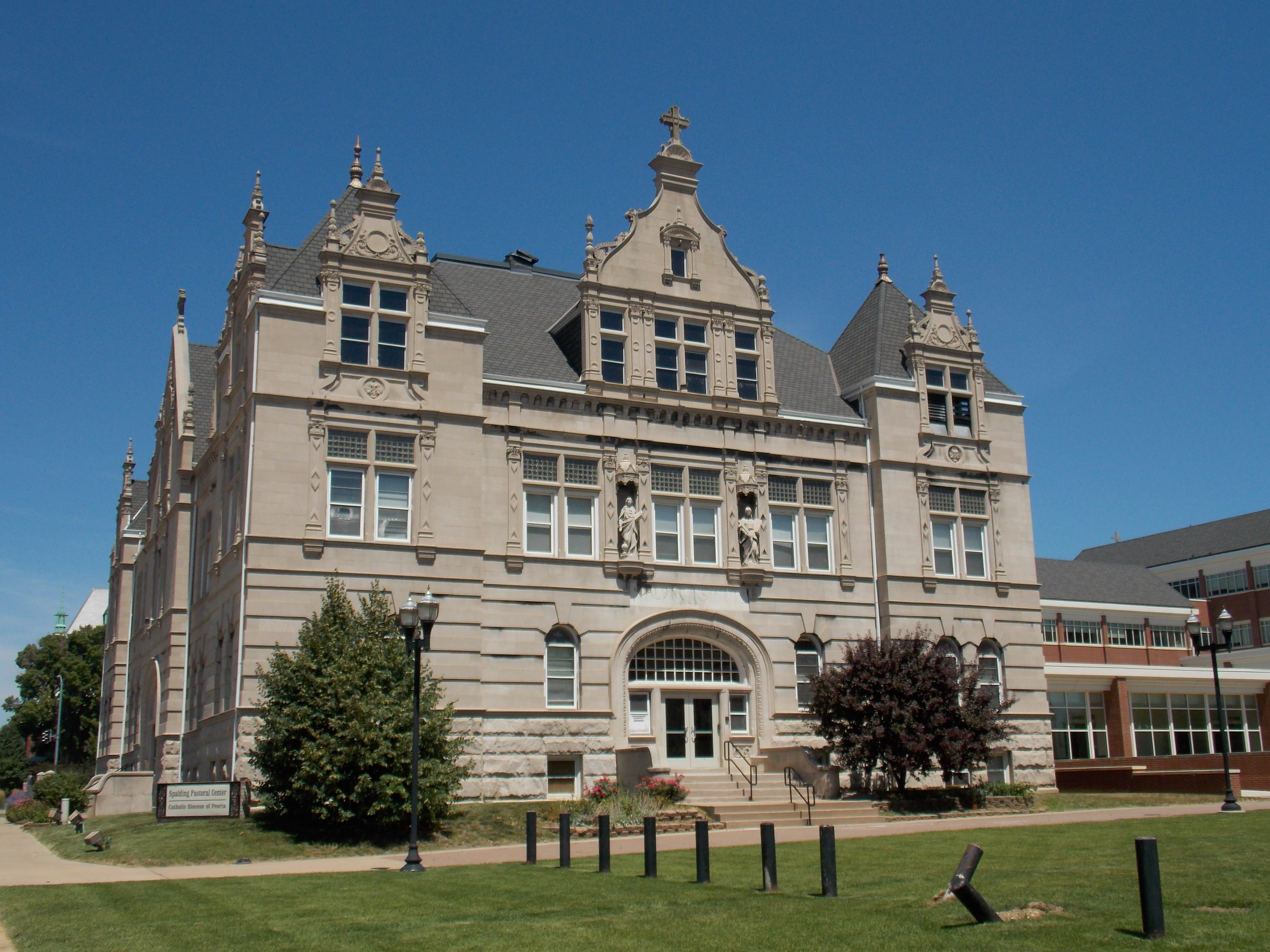
The former Spalding Institute, now the Spalding Pastoral Center.

== Proposed new campus ==
In 2006, the school's Education Commission, in conjunction with the Peoria Area Pastors' Board and the Diocesan Office of Catholic Schools, hired The Reid Group of Bellevue, Washington, to develop and conduct a campus location study. In June 2008, it was announced that the Reid Group had advised the Commission to build a new school, an athletic facility/pool, and new sports fields on a 40-acre (160,000 m^{2}) campus north of the present Peoria Academy near the intersection of Willow Knolls Road and Allen Road in outlying Peoria. The estimated $60 million required would be funded largely through a capital campaign and private donations, the diocese, and potentially other parishes in nearby counties. In 2018, the school scaled back the proposed plan to build a new school and complete athletic facilities for a much smaller plan to construct practice fields for the football and soccer teams and an accompanying parking lot. The school made those plans after funding for the project dried up.

== Curriculum ==
Beginning in the 2010–2011 school year many changes were implemented, including a trimester schedule, a house system, and a one-to-one laptop program. The trimester system lowers the number of students the average teacher sees to around 80 a semester from the usual average of 130–150. Longer class periods enable a more engaged approach to education with more time for labs and project-based instruction. Every freshman and sophomore student was required to purchase and use a Macintosh laptop. Peoria Notre Dame High School is the first high school in the state of Illinois to partner with Apple in implementing a one-to-one laptop environment. More course content, including AP and college-credit courses and computer coursework, will be done on-line and in a dual online/lecture form. More electives will be offered, and the school intends to offer additional dual-credit courses using the online format.

The school held its first snow day Internet class, an economics class taught by principal Charlie Roy, in January 2010.

== Athletics ==
Peoria Notre Dame sponsors both boys and girls sports which compete under the nickname of the "Fighting Irish". Their colors are blue, white and kelly green. The Irish, along with Peoria's public high schools, have competed in the Big Twelve Conference since 2014. They were previously in the Mid-State 6 Conference. The school has a long-standing rivalry with Richwoods High School which is located just a mile and half away from Peoria Notre Dame's campus and shares much of the same geographic territory where Notre Dame draws its students from on Peoria's north side.

State Championships
| Sport | Class | School year(s) |
|---|---|---|
| Boys Cross country | 1A | 1980-1981, 1981-1982 |
| Girls Cross country | 2A | 2010-2011 |
| Boys Soccer | 2A | 2004-2005, 2008-2009, 2010–2011, 2012-2013, 2022-2023, 2026-2027 |
| Boys Golf | 2A | 2019-2020 |
| Boys Wrestling | 1A | 2019-2020 |
| Girls Track & Field | 1A | 1980-1981, 1981-1982, 1982-1983 |
| Girls Basketball | 2A | 2023-2024 |

== Houses ==
Peoria Notre Dame introduced the house system, which is traditionally used in British and Commonwealth schools, in 2010. Students are randomly assigned to one of the six houses, which are named after prominent figures in the Catholic church or school history. Each house has approximately 150 students and is a blend of students from all years.

- Benedict
- Carondelet
- Marian
- Sheen
- Rice
- Viator

== Notable alumni ==
=== Academy of our Lady/Spalding Institute ===
- Archbishop Fulton J. Sheen - Roman Catholic Archbishop and media personality, Beatified by Pope Leo XIV on September 24, 2026 (SI, 1913)
- Archbishop Gerald Thomas Bergan - Former Archbishop of the Roman Catholic Archdiocese of Omaha, namesake of Bergan High School (Peoria, Illinois) (SI)
- Pete Vonachen - Peoria businessman and former owner of the Peoria Chiefs (SI)
- General Wayne A. Downing - Former Commander-in-Chief, U.S. Special Operations Command (SOCOM) (SI)
- Frank Rezac - Brigadier General (SI, 1962)
- Ray LaHood - 16th United States Secretary of Transportation and former Member of Congress for Illinois's 18th congressional district (SI, 1963)
- Darin LaHood - Member of Congress for Illinois's 18th congressional district (AOL/SI, 1986)
- Timothy L. Mounts - USDA chemist
- Joe Girardi - Manager of the Philadelphia Phillies (AOL/SI)
- Jim Ardis - Mayor of Peoria (SI, 1977)
- Tim Butler - Member of the Illinois House of Representatives from the 87th District

=== Bergan High School ===
- Tom Gilles - former professional baseball player
- Bart Shatto - Broadway actor

=== Peoria Notre Dame High School ===
- Brian Randle (born 1985), Assistant basketball coach for the Phoenix Suns.
- Noah Reynolds (born 2002), basketball player

== See also ==
- Quincy Notre Dame High School — named Notre Dame since 1928, and also in Illinois
