= Mid-State 6 Conference =

Defunct Illinois high school sports conference

The Mid-State 6 Conference was a high school athletics conference in central Illinois, made up of the high schools in Peoria, Illinois plus various other schools over the course of its existence. It existed for several decades. Previous names included MidState 8 and MidState 9 in the 1960s, and Mid-State 10 in the 1980s and 1990s.

As of December 2013, the only schools remaining were in the city of Peoria: Peoria Notre Dame and the three general public high schools Manual, Peoria (Central), and Richwoods. Those schools were joined the Big 12 Conference in 2014.

== History ==
After IVC High School and Quincy Notre Dame left the Mid-State 6, a merger with the Western Big 6 Conference was set to begin in 2013 with football. However, when Manual's prior obligation to play Eureka made it unable to schedule a game with Moline High School, the merger failed, with the Mid-State 6 schools instead playing officially as independents against Western Big 6 Conference schools in football during the 2013–2014 school year.

=== Past members ===
- Academy of Our Lady/Spalding Institute — name defunct in 1988 upon creation of Peoria Notre Dame High School
- Bergan High School — name defunct in 1988 when succeeded by Peoria Notre Dame High School
- Illinois Valley Central High School (football only) until 2013
- E. N. Woodruff High School — closed as a traditional high school in 2010; had always been in the same conference as other Peoria public schools
- Quincy Notre Dame High School until 2013

== See also ==
- Mid-Illini Conference — the conference of schools surrounding, but not in, Peoria
- Canton High School
- Dunlap High School
- East Peoria Community High School
- Limestone Community High School
- Metamora Township High School
- Morton High School
- Pekin High School
- Washington Community High School
