= Bergan High School =

Bergan High School could mean:

- Archbishop Bergan High School, a high school in Fremont, Nebraska
- Bergan High School (Peoria, Illinois), a high school from 1963 to 1988 that consolidated as Peoria Notre Dame High School
