= 1920 Illinois gubernatorial election =

- November 2, 1920
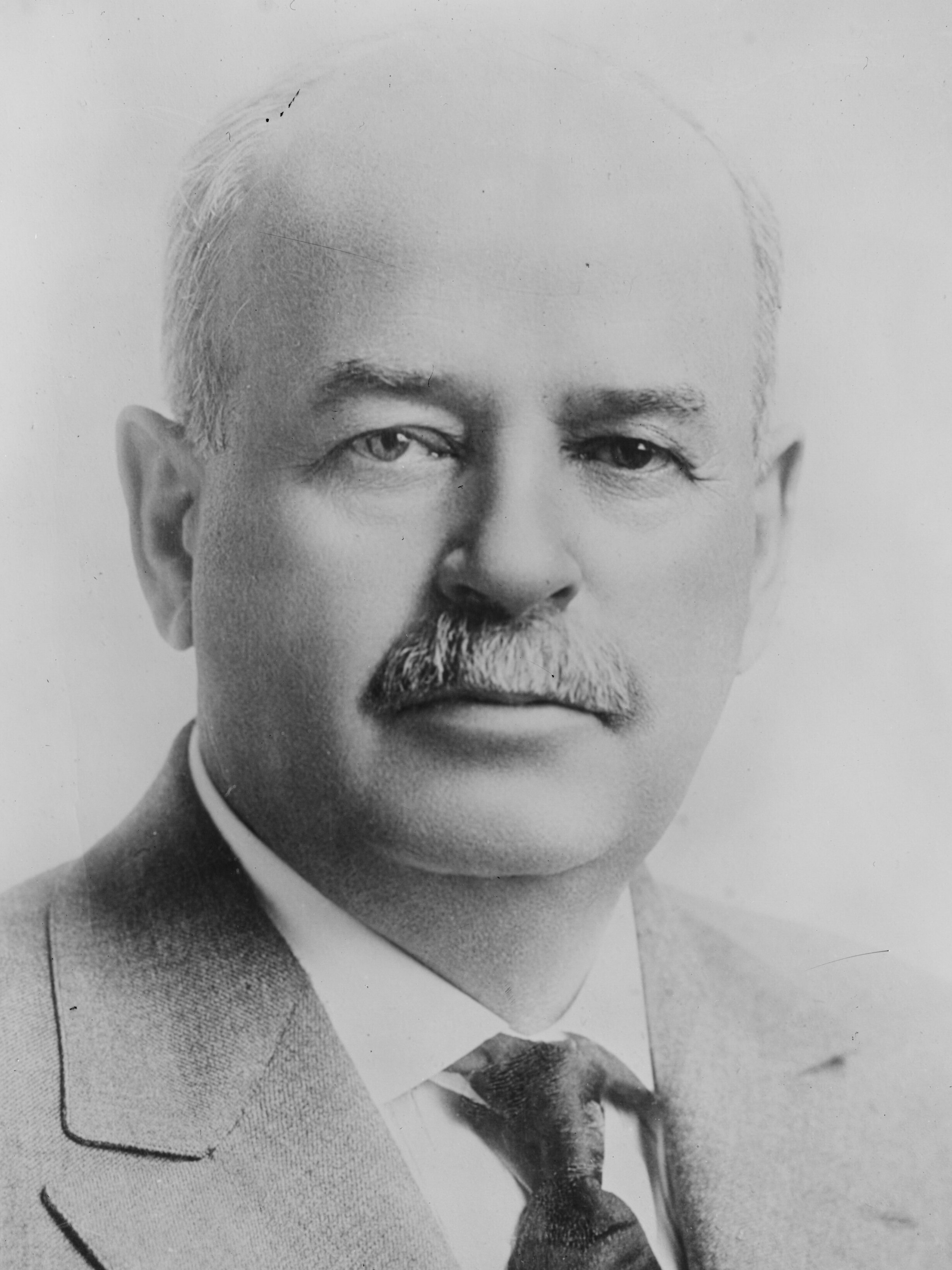

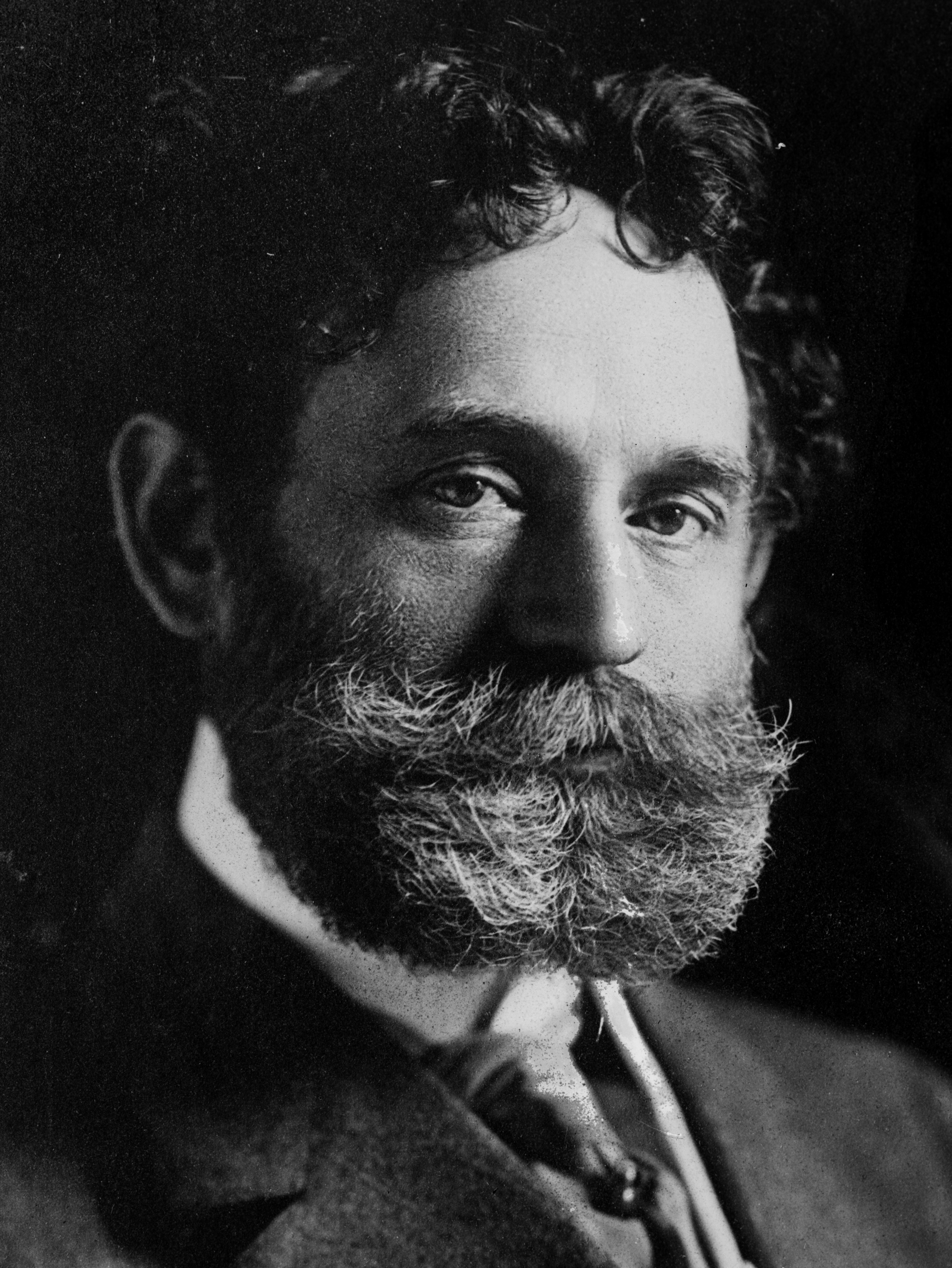
Nominee	Len Small	J. Hamilton Lewis
Party	Republican	Democratic
Popular vote	1,243,148	731,541
Percentage	58.87%	34.64%
- County results Small: 40–50% 50–60% 60–70% 70–80% 80–90% Lewis: 40–50% 50–60%
Governor before election
Frank Orren Lowden
Republican
Elected Governor
Len Small
Republican

The 1920 Illinois gubernatorial election was held on November 2, 1920.

Incumbent first-term Republican Governor Frank Orren Lowden declined to stand for re-election. He was an unsuccessful candidate for the Republican nomination for U.S. President at the 1920 Republican National Convention.

Republican nominee Len Small defeated Democratic nominee James Hamilton Lewis with 58.78% of the vote.

== Primary elections ==
Primary elections were held on September 15, 1920.

=== Democratic primary ===
==== Candidates ====
- James Hamilton Lewis, former U.S. Senator
- Barratt O'Hara, former Lieutenant Governor

==== Results ====
Democratic primary results
Party	Candidate	Votes	%
Democratic	James Hamilton Lewis	153,717	85.14
Democratic	Barratt O'Hara	26,827	14.86
Total votes		180,544	100.00

=== Republican primary ===
==== Candidates ====
- Oscar E. Carlstrom, Mercer County state's attorney
- John G. Oglesby, incumbent Lieutenant Governor
- Len Small, former State Treasurer
- Edward N. Woodruff, mayor of Peoria

==== Results ====
Republican primary results
Party	Candidate	Votes	%
Republican	Len Small	377,005	46.49
Republican	John G. Oglesby	369,103	45.52
Republican	Edward N. Woodruff	34,506	4.26
Republican	Oscar E. Carlstrom	30,836	3.74
Total votes		811,450	100.00

=== Socialist primary ===
==== Candidates ====
- Andrew Lafin

==== Results ====
Socialist primary results
Party	Candidate	Votes	%
Socialist	Andrew Lafin	1,859	100.00
Total votes		1,859	100.00

== General election ==
=== Candidates ===
==== Major candidates ====
- Len Small, Republican
- James Hamilton Lewis, Democratic

==== Minor candidates ====
- Harrison Parker, Co-operative, former president of the Chicago-American Newspaper Company
- John H. Walker, Farmer-Labor, national Chairman of the Farmer-Labor Party
- John Maynard Harlan, Harding-Coolidge Republican, Independent nominee for mayor of Chicago 1897 and Republican nominee for mayor of Chicago in 1905
- Parke Longworth, Liberal
- James H. Woertendyke, Prohibition, Prohibition nominee for U.S. House in 1904 from Illinois's 13th congressional district
- Lewis D. Spaulding, Single Tax
- Andrew Lafin, Socialist, Socialist nominee for U.S. House in 1916 from Illinois's 9th congressional district
- John M. Francis, Socialist Labor, nominee for Governor in 1916

=== Results ===
1920 Illinois gubernatorial election
Party	Candidate	Votes	%	±%
Republican	Len Small	1,243,148	58.87%	
Democratic	James Hamilton Lewis	731,551	34.64%	
Socialist	Andrew Lafin	58,998	2.79%	
Farmer–Labor	John H. Walker	56,480	2.67%	
Prohibition	James H. Woertendyke	9,876	0.47%	
Independent Republican	John Maynard Harlan	5,985	0.28%	
Socialist Labor	John M. Francis	3,020	0.14%	
Co-operative Party	Harrison Parker	1,260	0.06%	
Single Tax	Lewis D. Spaulding	930	0.04%	
Liberal	Parke Longworth	357	0.02%	
	Scattering	5	0.00%	
Majority		511,597	24.23%	
Turnout		2,111,605	100.00%	
Republican hold		Swing		

== See also ==
- 1920 Illinois lieutenant gubernatorial election

== Bibliography ==
- Glashan, Roy R. (1979). American Governors and Gubernatorial Elections, 1775-1978. Meckler Books. ISBN 0-930466-17-9.
- Compiled by Louis L. Emmerson, Secretary of State (1920). Official vote of the State of Illinois cast at the General Election, Nov. 2, 1920, &c., &c. Springfield, Illinois: Illinois State Journal Co., State Printers.
