= Scottish Rite Cathedral (Peoria, Illinois) =

- U.S. Historic district – Contributing property
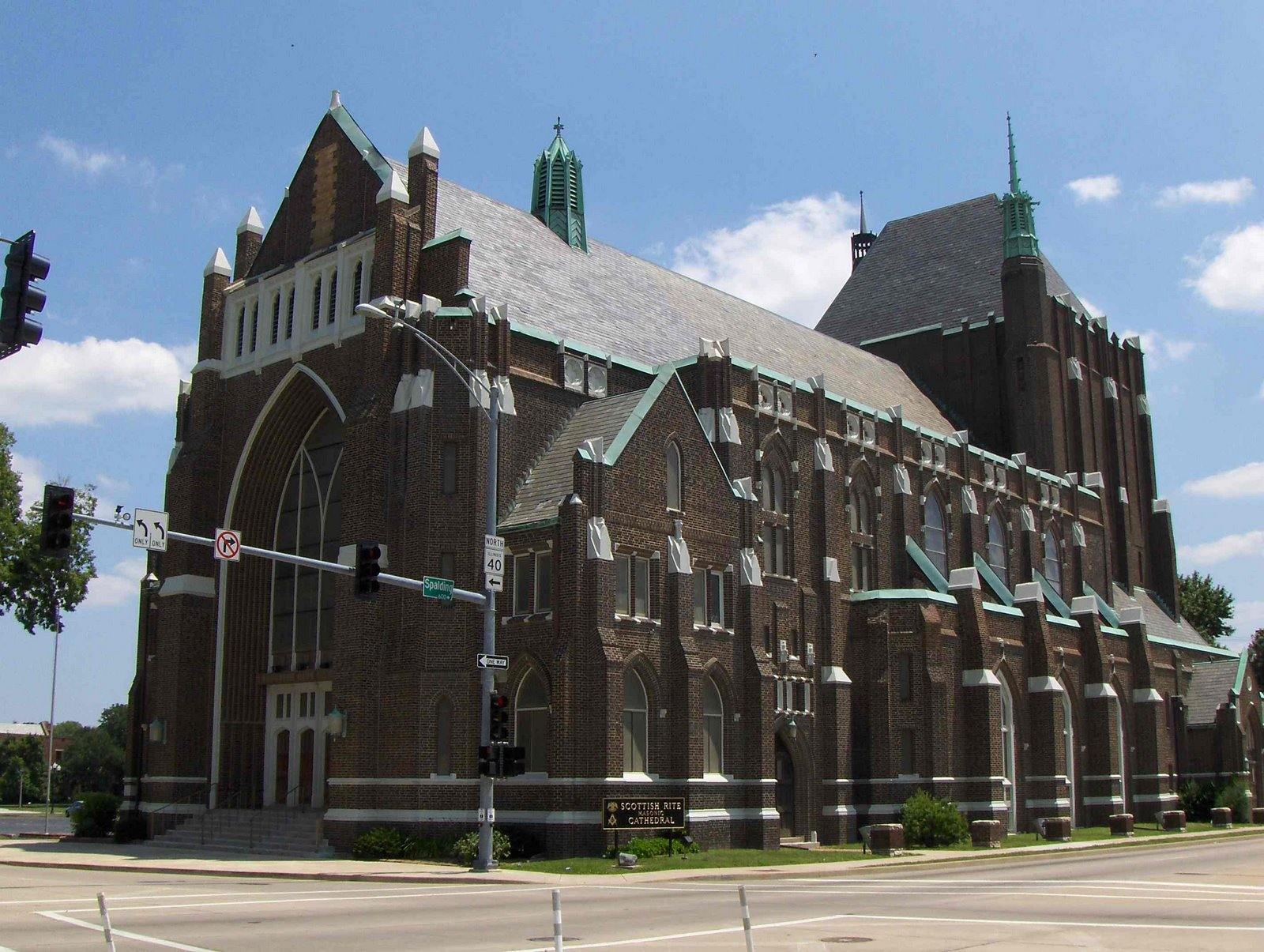
- The cathedral in 2018
- Interactive map of Scottish Rite Cathedral
- Location: 400 NE Perry Ave, Peoria, Illinois
- Coordinates: 40°41′52.8″N 89°35′22.2″W
- Built: May 7, 1924
- Architect: Herbert Hewitt of Hewitt, Emerson, and Gregg
- Architectural style: Gothic
- Website: www.scottishritepeoria.com
- Part of: North Side Historic District (ID83003588)

The Scottish Rite Cathedral, now named the Scottish Rite Theatre, is church-style building in Peoria, Illinois that houses the Scottish Rite Bodies of the Valley of Peoria. The building is at 400 NE Perry Avenue, at the corner with Spalding Avenue. The cathedral is listed as a contributing property to Peoria's North Side Historic District.

== History ==
The Scottish Rite Bodies of the Valley of Peoria was established in Yates City, Illinois on February 25, 1867, and moved to Peoria in 1869. The body had 3 meeting locations in downtown Peoria before the Scottish Rite Cathedral.

== Architecture ==
Hewitt, Emerson and Gregg architectural firm constructed the building at a cost of $400,000. Herbert Hewitt of this firm was known designing the First National Bank Building, the highest building in Peoria at the time. The cornerstone for the Scottish Rite Cathedral was laid on May 7, 1924. It was dedicated in a public ceremony on January 13, 1925.

The Gothic architecture was inspired by Edward Ulysses Henry's travels to Europe. The cathedral design features flying buttresses and symbolic stained glass windows. The cathedral has an auditorium with a stage and 900 seats.

== Renovation ==
The Masonic membership in the Valley of Peoria was near 15,000 at one time, but had dropped to 1,200 by 2019, and was having trouble affording the maintenance of the building. Kim Blickenstaff, who grew up in nearby East Peoria, bought the Cathedral on April 26, 2019, for $490,000, with plans to put it in a trust, operate it as a community venue, and allow Scottish Rite members to use the venue in perpetuity.

Plans to open the theatre were delayed by the COVID-19 pandemic, but construction work continued. In 2020, the Peoria Historical Society awarded the KBD group a Historic Preservation Award.

In January, 2023, the KBD group announced the venue would close on January 15. The building was listed for sale in April 2023.
