= Jim Ardis =

American politician

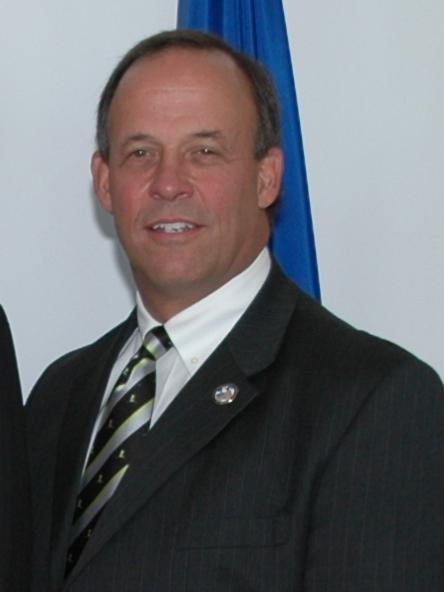
- Jim Ardis in 2009

46th Mayor of Peoria
- In office May 5, 2005 – May 4, 2021
- Preceded by: Dave Ransburg
- Succeeded by: Rita Ali

Personal details
- Born: May 25, 1959 (age 67) Peoria, Illinois, U.S.
- Party: Republican
- Spouse: Mimi
- Children: 3
- Education: Illinois State University (B.S., 1982)
- Profession: Corporate executive

Jim Ardis (born May 25, 1959) is an American corporate executive and politician who served as mayor of Peoria, Illinois from 2005 to 2021. Prior to becoming mayor, he had previously served on the Peoria City Council from 1999 through 2005. Ardis is the second-longest serving mayor in city history behind Edward Nelson Woodruff.

== Background ==
When Ardis was 10, his father, Jim Ardis Jr., became a Peoria city councilman, serving from 1969 to 1973. His grandfather, John Bulger, had been Peoria County clerk.

Ardis graduated from high school at Spalding Institute in 1977 and from Illinois State University with a Bachelor of Science in industrial technology in 1982.

Ardis owned O'Leary's Restaurant from 1994 to 1997. From 1999 to 2006, Ardis worked in sales for Univar; from 2006 to 2010, he was Midwest Vice President of ELM Locating. Since 2010, he has been Executive Director of Corporate Strategies for Peoria-based Axis, Inc., part of Jupiter Strategic Technologies Pvt. Ltd. of Bangalore.

== Political career ==
Ardis sold O'Leary's Restaurant in 1997 and was appointed to the Peoria city liquor commission. He was elected a Peoria city councilman at-large in 1999, and remained a member of the council until 2005.

Ardis was elected as mayor in 2005, defeating incumbent Dave Ransburg. He won re-election in 2009 against General John Parker. In 2021, after 16 years as mayor, Ardis chose not to run again and was succeeded by Rita Ali.

In 2011, Ardis sought appointment to the Illinois State Senate seat vacated by the retirement of Dale Risinger. Darin LaHood ultimately received the appointment.

=== Twitter controversy ===
On April 15, 2014, at the request of Jim Ardis, Peoria police investigated Jon Daniel, the operator of a Twitter account parodying Ardis, on suspicion of the misdemeanor crime of false personation of a public official. After obtaining a warrant, police sent a SWAT Team to raid Daniel's home in West Bluff, seizing electronics and detaining three people for questioning. Police charged one man with possession of marijuana and drug paraphernalia following the raid, though no arrests were made in connection with the Twitter account. On April 23, 2014, the Peoria County State's Attorney's Office announced that no charges would be filed against the creator of the original parody account after explaining that current law regarding impersonation of a public official does not include the use of electronic media.

On June 11, 2014, Daniel, through the American Civil Liberties Union of Illinois, filed a federal lawsuit against the City of Peoria, Ardis, and several city employees, claiming violation of the First Amendment and Fourth Amendment. Ardis responded with a press conference on June 12, in which he said the controversy "caused harm to our great city and serious threats against me and my family" and that "I will protect my rights and the rights of my family at all costs. I am exploring false light and defamation as well as other actions against those responsible for the placing and hosting of the libelous comments."

On September 2, 2015, it was announced that the lawsuit was settled with $125,000 being awarded to Daniel. The Jefferson Center for the Protection of Free Expression gave Ardis one of its annual Jefferson Muzzle Awards for "the past year’s most outrageous and ridiculous affronts to free speech and press", declaring that he had "abus[ed] the power of his office to intimidate and silence a harmless parodist".

== Electoral history ==
=== City Council ===
2003 Peoria City Council election at-large election
Candidate	Votes	%
Gary V. Sandberg	17,273	21.33
W. Eric Turner	14,442	17.83
Jim Ardis	10,857	13.41
John D. Morris	10,744	13.27
Charles V. Grayeb	10,235	12.64
Edward P. Glover	7,985	9.86
Patti J. Polk	6,416	7.92
Ray A. Rusch	3,029	3.74
Total votes	80,981	100

=== Mayoral ===
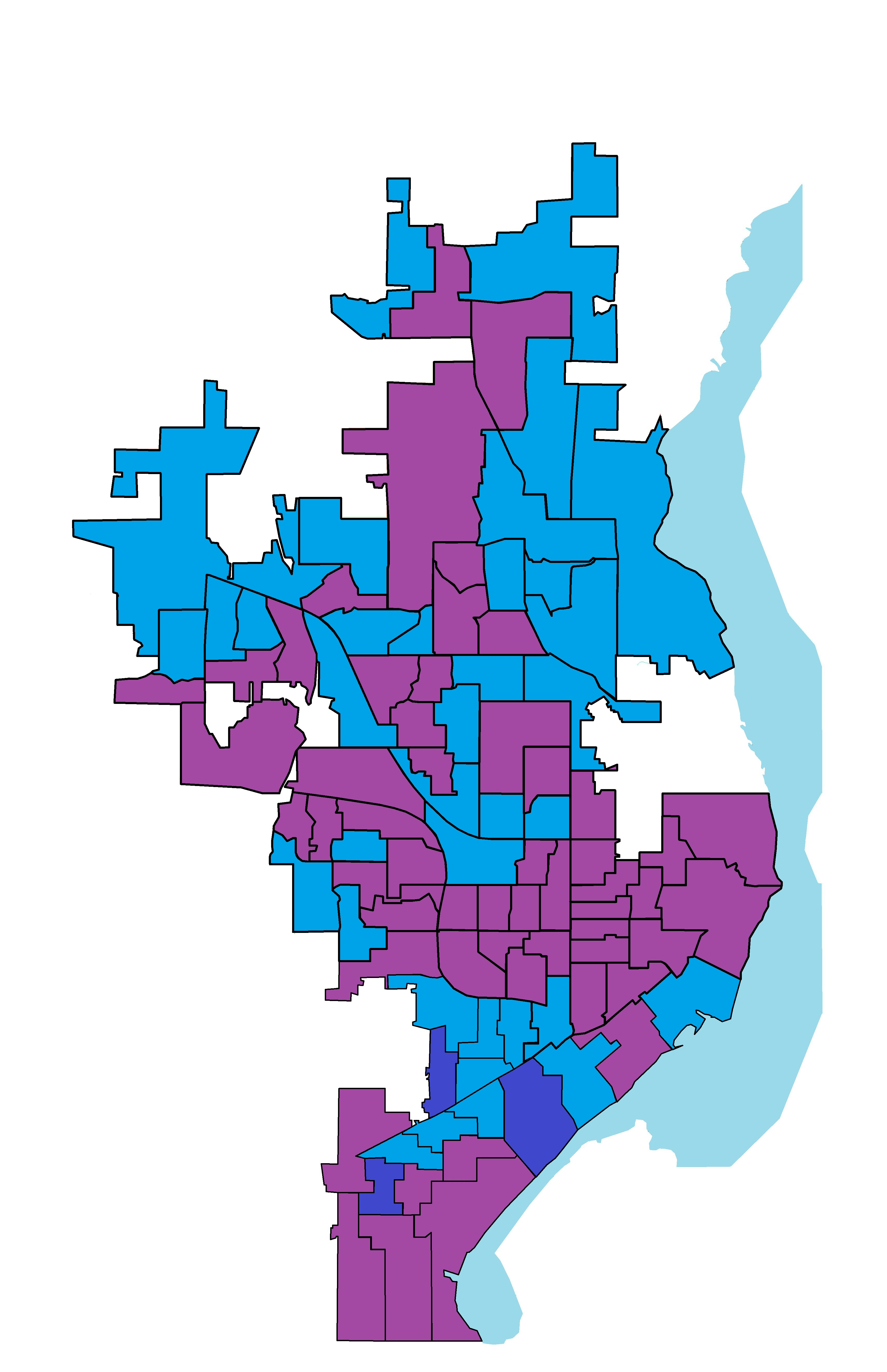
2005 mayoral runoff results: Ardis Ransburg Tie

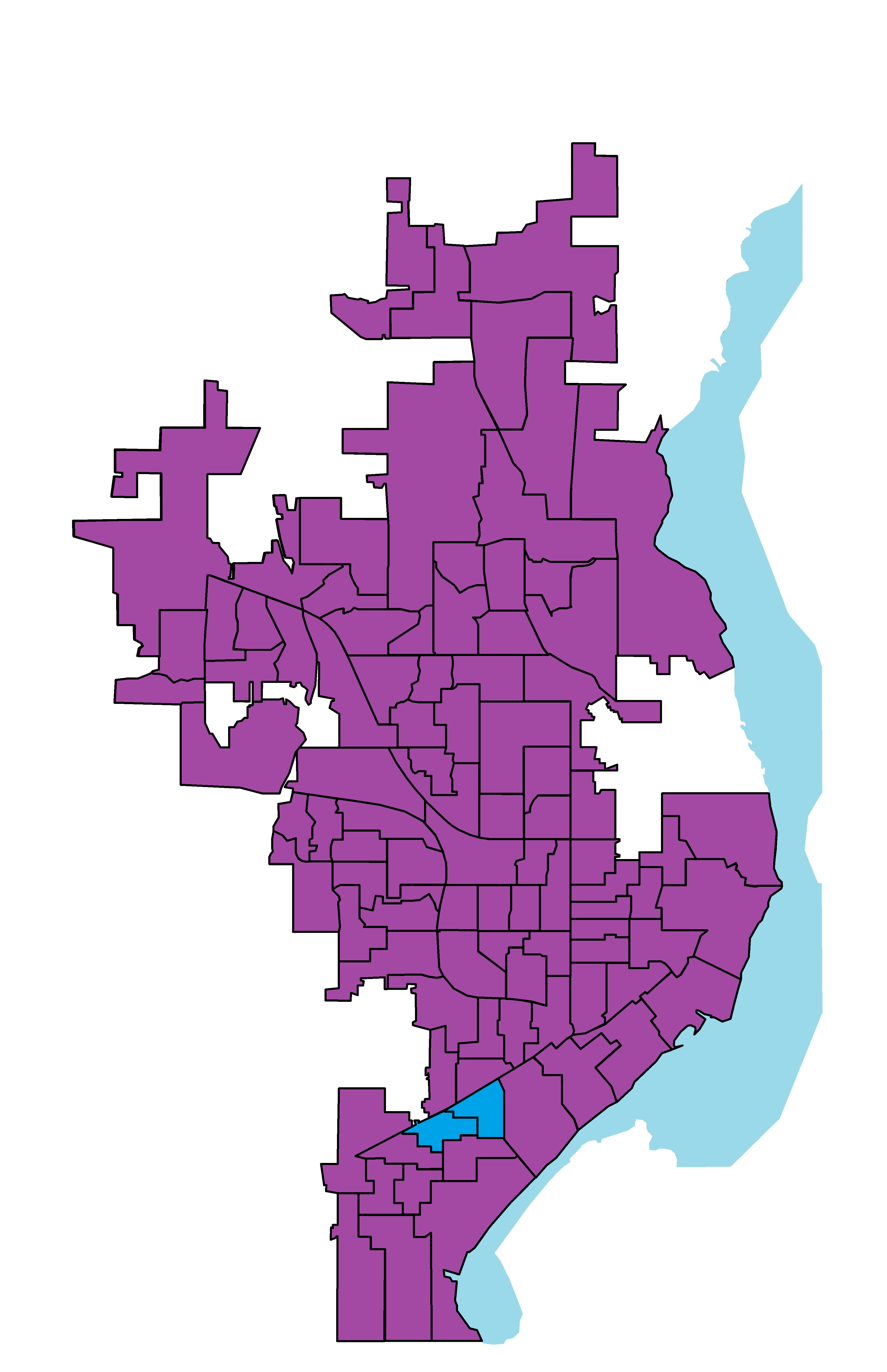
2009 mayoral election results: Ardis Butler

2005 Peoria mayoral election
Candidate	First round		Runoff	
Candidate	Votes	%	Votes	%
Jim Ardis	4,399	33.21	12,190	55.05
David P. Ransburg (incumbent)	4,628	34.93	9,953	44.95
W. Eric Turner	2,525	19.06		
Bruce Brown	1,686	12.73		
Leonard Cox (write-in)	1	0.00		
Total	13,240	100	22,143	100

Peoria mayoral election, 2009
Candidate	Votes	Percentage
Jim Ardis (incumbent)	14,893	90.50%
General "John" Butler	1,563	9.50%
Totals	16,456	100%

Peoria mayoral election, 2013
Candidate	Votes	Percentage
Jim Ardis (incumbent )	7,731	100
Totals	7,731	100%

Peoria mayoral election, 2017
Candidate	Votes	Percentage
Jim Ardis (incumbent)	7,069	54.01%
Couri Thomas	6,019	45.99%
Totals	13,088	100%

== See also ==
- List of mayors of Peoria, Illinois
