= Pete Vonachen =

American businessman and baseball executive

- Born: August 31, 1925; Peoria, Illinois, U.S.
- Died: June 10, 2013 (aged 87); Peoria, Illinois, U.S.
- Education: Spalding Institute
- Alma mater: Bradley University
- Occupations: businessman; restaurateur; baseball team owner
- Years active: 1983 to 2013
- Known for: Peoria Chiefs
- Military career
- Allegiance: United States
- Branch: United States Navy
- Service years: 1943 to 1946

Harold Albert "Pete" Vonachen, Jr. (August 31, 1925 – June 10, 2013) was an American businessman and Minor league baseball team owner. Born in Peoria, Illinois, he was often dubbed "Peoria's Mr. Baseball, although this was usually only done for press consumption.

== Early life ==
Vonachen was a Spalding Institute graduate in 1943 and earned a Bachelor of Science in business administration from Bradley University in 1949. In the interim, he served in the United States Navy from December 1943 through May 1946.

A restaurateur and sports businessman, Vonachen purchased Peoria's Class-A Midwest League franchise after the 1983 season.

== Baseball in Peoria ==
Professional baseball in Peoria can be traced back to 1878, when William Morgan, an early minor league operator, formed an independent club named the Peoria Reds, which frequently beat National League clubs. One notable player who started his career with the Peoria Reds in 1878 was pitcher Charles Radbourn, who was among the first group of players inducted into the Baseball Hall of Fame in 1939.

In 1883, the Peoria Reds became one of the founding members of the Northwestern League, one of the first organized baseball circuits in the Midwest. After that, many Peoria teams played in several early leagues for the next five decades. During the time baseball was not present in Peoria, the United States entered World War II, which led to a shortage of professional baseball players throughout the entire country. This scenario led to the formation of the All-American Girls Professional Baseball League in 1943. Then, the Peoria Redwings joined the ladies league in 1946. The AAGPBL folded in 1954, but made its mark not only in Peoria, but in baseball history as evidenced in the film A League of Their Own.

The name Peoria Chiefs first appeared with a new franchise in the Three-I League in 1953. This club disbanded after 1957, and Peoria was again without professional ball for the next 25 years until the Peoria Suns joined the Midwest League in 1983 as an affiliate club for the California Angels.

== Peoria Chiefs ==
An innovator in promotions and marketing, Vonachen purchased the Peoria Suns in late 1983 and turned the Midwest League franchise into a 1980s powerhouse after renaming the team the Chiefs in 1984. Then, the Chiefs became an affiliate of the Chicago Cubs from 1985–1995, moved to the St. Louis Cardinals from 1996–2004, rejoined the Cubs from 2005 through 2012, and returned to St. Louis in 2013.

With Vonachen at the helm, the Chiefs attendance at Meinen Field grew each season from 1984 to 1989, setting Midwest League attendance records in 1985, 1988 and 1989, with an all-time league mark of 196,000 fans in 1989, when Vonachen sold the team.

Stressing first-class facilities and a belief that fans should have fun at the ball park, Vonachen, with the cooperation of the Peoria Park District, turned Meinen Field into such an attractive park that it won the 1987 Midwest League Gold Award for the most outstanding facility in the league.

During this period, the Class-A Chiefs were led by future big leaguers as Joe Girardi, Mark Grace, Greg Maddux, Derrick May, Rafael Palmeiro, Dwight Smith, Jerome Walton and Rick Wilkins, among others, being managed by Joe Maddon (1984), Pete Mackanin (1985–1986), Jim Tracy (1987–1988) and Brad Mills (1989).

On April 18, 1992, Meinen Field was renamed Pete Vonachen Stadium. Then Vonachen returned to the Chiefs in September 1994, leading a new investor group and serving as their general manager through 1998. During his second stint with the club, Vonachen helped the Chiefs secure the site and raised money for the development of a new downtown stadium, while attendance grew by nearly 20,000 fans. After retiring, he turned over the reins to his son Rocky Vonachen in 1998. In 2002, the Chiefs moved into their new ballpark O'Brien Field, won their first ever Midwest League Championship, and obliterated the franchise attendance mark. In 2009, the site was renamed Peoria Chiefs Stadium.

== Honors ==
During his time with the Chiefs, Vonachen was named Midwest League Executive of the Year and The Sporting News Class-A Pro Baseball Minor League Executive of the Year. He also served on the Peoria Park Board for over six years and was the President of the Peoria Pacers CICLL team.

In addition, he won the Neve Harms Meritorious Service to Sports Award, served on the Peoria Park Board for several years, was Tri-County Outstanding Sports Figure of the year in 1985, and served on the board of the Greater Peoria Sports Hall of Fame, of which he is a member, being elected in 1988.

On May 18, 2011, Vonachen was honored by the Chicago Cubs at Wrigley Field, where the Cubs officially celebrated the Pete Vonachen Day in a game against their bitter rivals St. Louis Cardinals. Vonachen tossed out the ceremonial first pitch and sang Take Me Out To The Ballgame during the seventh-inning stretch. Among the former Chiefs on the rosters were Albert Pujols, Yadier Molina, Kyle McClellan and Jason Motte of the Cardinals, and Darwin Barney, Jeff Samardzija, Casey Coleman and Justin Berg of the Cubs, plus Chicago bullpen coach Lester Strode. The Cubs won the contest, 11–4.

== Personal life ==
Vonachen married the former Donna Hurst in 1957 and they raised a family of five children, Mary Michael Shadid, Harold (Rocky) III, Gregory, Daniel and Mark.

== Death ==
Vonachen died in Peoria at the age of 87. His death came just three days after his final public appearance, when he was on hand for the Peoria Chiefs Stadium’s rededication as Dozer Park on June 7, 2013.
