= Rita Ali =

47th Mayor of Peoria, Illinois

47th Mayor of Peoria
- Incumbent
- Assumed office May 4, 2021
- Preceded by: Jim Ardis

Personal details
- Born: January 31, 1958 (age 68)
- Party: Democratic
- Education: University of Illinois Springfield; Bradley University; Capella University

Rita Ali (born January 31, 1958) is an American politician serving as the 47th mayor of Peoria, Illinois since 2021. She was elected on April 21, 2021, finishing just 43 votes ahead of her opponent, councilman Jim Montelongo. Ali was sworn in two weeks later on May 4, becoming both the first woman and the first African American to serve as mayor of Peoria. She has previously served on the Peoria City Council and has held a position as Vice President of Workforce and Diversity at Illinois Central College.

== Formative years ==
Ali is the daughter of Robert and Nora Bryant. She has an older sister, Robin, and younger brother, Robert. She spent her early years in Hannibal, Missouri, and subsequently relocated with her family to Peoria, Illinois during 1964, when she was six years old.

Ali was a 1976 graduate of Manual High School. A single parent following her graduation, she began her college education at Bradley University with the help of a full-tuition scholarship (the Romeo B. Garrett Scholarship), and attended classes there for two years until financial circumstances forced her to temporarily leave school to work full time. Thirty years later, she was a doctoral candidate in organization and management at Capella University in Minneapolis, Minnesota in 2006, having previously earned her bachelor's degree in human services management from the University of Illinois Springfield and her master's degree in education administration from Bradley University.

As Rita Bryant, she met her future husband, Bashir Ali, while they were both employed by the City of Peoria's Central Illinois Private Industry Council. She and Ali were married on May 6, 1996, and have four daughters and nine grandchildren. Bashir Ali has been the director of workforce development for the City of Peoria since 1987.

== Professional life ==
Rita Ali secured her first job at the age of fourteen. She was employed as a community outreach worker by the Dar es Salaam (House of Peace) Center on Peoria's South Side, and was also later a community organizer for the Northside Action Council. Later in her professional life, as the manager of the federal division of an information technology company, Rita Ali worked in Washington, DC for two years, but decided to return to Peoria to be closer to family. Hired as the director of Multicultural Student Services at Bradley University, she was subsequently appointed as the director of diversity at Illinois Central College in 2004.

== Political career ==
Still employed at Illinois Central College in 2019, Rita Ali held the title of vice president of workforce, diversity and career development. She had also been elected to the Peoria City Council.

== Mayor of Peoria ==
Ali was an at-large member of the Peoria City Council at the time she announced her run for mayor in 2020. She was successful, and made history, becoming the first woman and first African American to become mayor of Peoria. She would then be soundly re-elected to a second term in 2025.

== See also ==
- List of mayors of Peoria, Illinois
- List of first African-American mayors
