= List of mayors of Peoria, Illinois =

The following is a list of mayors of the city of Peoria, Illinois, United States.

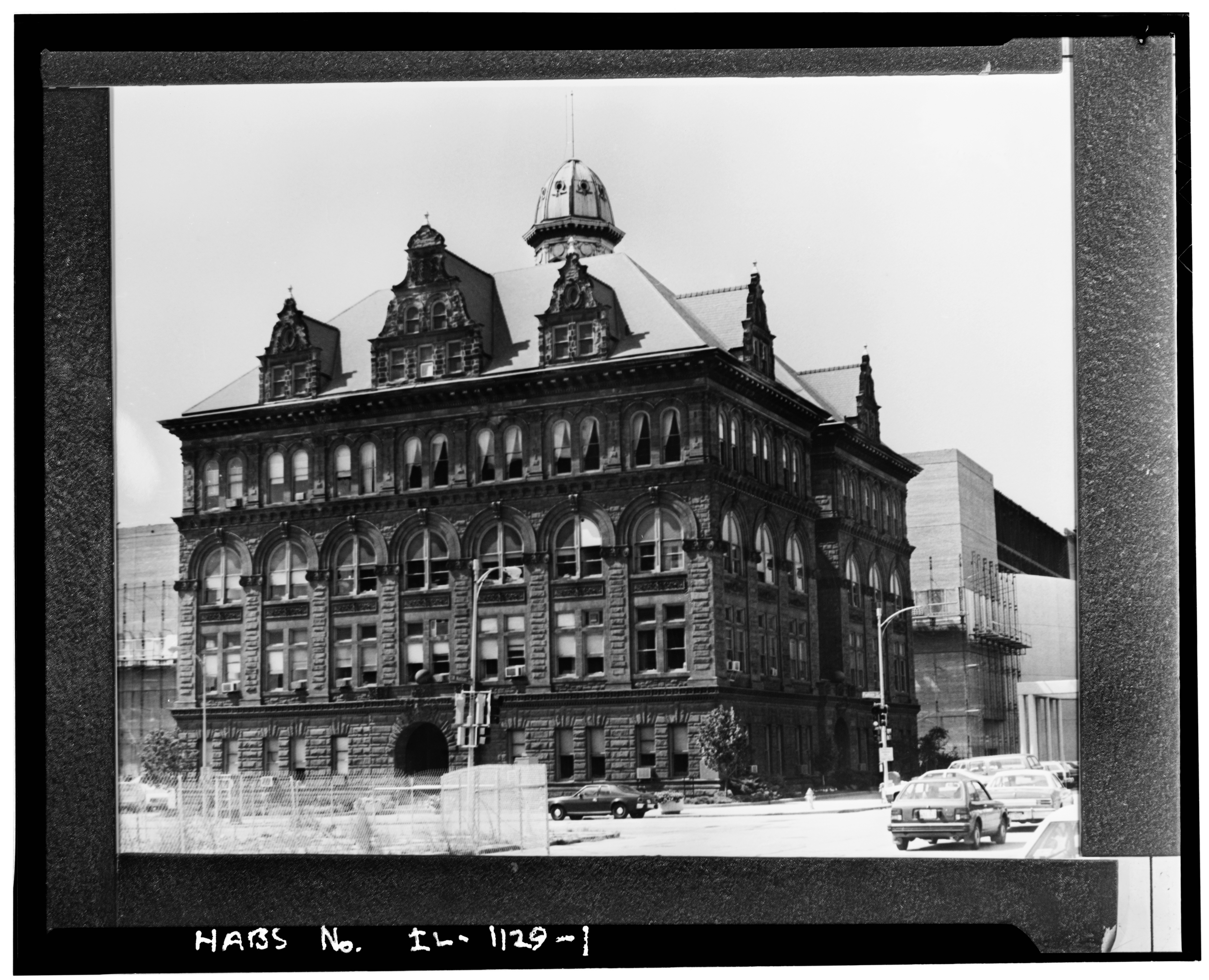
City hall building on Fulton Street in Peoria, Illinois (photo 1980s)

- William Hale, 1845
- Charles Thomas Stearns, 1846
- William Mitchell, 1847-1848
- Jacob Gale, 1849
- Dennis Blakeley, 1850
- George C. Bestor, 1851, 1853-1854
- Jonathan K. Cooper, 1852
- Charles Ballance, 1855
- Gardiner T. Barker, 1857–1858, 1862, 1870-1871
- William R. Hamilton, 1858-1859
- John D. Arnold, 1860
- William A. Willard, 1861
- Matthew W. McReynolds, 1863
- Henry T. Baldwin, 1865-1866
- Philip Bender, 1867
- Peter R.K. Brotherson, 1868–1869, 1872-1873
- John Warner, 1874–1875, 1878–1881, 1884–1885, 1888–1889, 1892, 1897-1898
- Leslie Robinson, 1876-1877
- Frank Hitchcock, 1882-1883
- Samuel A. Kinsey, 1886-1887
- Charles C. Clarke, 1890-1892
- Philo B. Miles, 1893-1894
- William M. Allen, 1895-1896
- Henry W. Lynch, 1899-1900
- William F. Bryan Jr., 1901-1902
- Edward Nelson Woodruff, 1903–1904, 1909–1920, 1923–1924, 1929–1930, 1935–1936, 1941-1944
- Allen B. Tolson, 1905-1906
- Thomas O'Connor, 1907-1908
- Victor P. Michel, 1921-1922
- Louis Mueller, 1925-1928
- Homer L. Ahrends, 1931-1932
- Charles L. O'Brien, 1933-1934
- David H. McClugage, 1937-1940
- Carl O. Triebel, 1945-1948
- Joseph O. Malone, 1949-1952
- Robert Dale Morgan, 1953-1956
- Eugene Leiter, 1957-1961
- Robert G. Day, 1961-1965
- Robert J. Lehnhausen, 1965-1969
- E. Michael O'Brien, 1969-1973
- Richard E. Carver, 1973-1984
- C. Richard Neumiller, 1984-1985
- James A. Maloof, 1985-1997
- Lowell G. "Bud" Grieves, 1997-2001
- David P. Ransburg, 2001-2005
- James E. Ardis III, 2005-2021
- Rita Ali, 2021–present

== See also ==
- Peoria City Hall
- History of Peoria, Illinois
