= Charles Thomas Stearns =

American politician (1807–1898)

Charles Thomas Stearns (January 9, 1807 – May 22, 1898) was an American politician, mayor of Peoria, Illinois (1846), member of the Minnesota Territorial Council (1849–1858) representing the 3rd District from 1854–55, and had taken an active part in securing the passage of the bill establishing the county.

He moved to St. Cloud, Minnesota, the following year and became a prominent member of the developing city. His "Stearns Hotel" became the original building of the Third State Normal School campus in 1869, predecessor of St. Cloud State Teachers College, now St. Cloud State University.

Stearns was born January 9, 1807, in Pittsfield, Massachusetts. He was married there in 1829 to the former Cornelia Burbank. The couple moved west to Missouri, Illinois, and eventually to Minnesota. In 1870, he moved to Mobile, Alabama, and then to New Orleans, Louisiana. He died in New Orleans on May 22, 1898.

Stearns County was officially established on February 20, 1855, and was originally called Stevens County to honor Governor Isaac I. Stevens (D), who had conducted an expedition to the area in 1853. The name was later changed to honor Stearns.

== See also ==
- List of mayors of Peoria, Illinois
