= Timothy L. Mounts =

United States Air Force general

- Born: 1937
- Died: 1997 (aged 59–60)
- Occupation: Chemist
- Awards: 1985 La Medaille Chevreul; 1991 Outstanding Scientist of the Year for Agricultural Research Service; 1997 A. Richard Baldwin Distinguished Service Award

Timothy L. Mounts (1937—1997) was an American chemist, active in the field of agriculture technology.

== Career ==
Mounts was research leader of the Food Quality and Safety Unit at the National Center for Agricultural Utilization Research (NCAUR) Agriculture Lab.

== Awards ==
Mounts received the 1985 La Medaille Chevreul from L'Association Francaise pour l'Etude des Corps Gras, the 1991 Outstanding Scientist of the Year for Agricultural Research Service and the 1997 A. Richard Baldwin Distinguished Service Award from the American Oil Chemists Society.

== Other activities ==
Mounts was a veteran of the United States Air Force, and the Illinois Air National Guard from which he retired as brigadier general in 1990.

Mounts was honored with the T.L. Mounts Lectureship at Bradley University in Peoria, Illinois. He was a staunch supporter of Bradley University, belonging to the alumni association and Bradley Chiefs club. Additionally, he was the president-elect of the Kiwanis Club of Peoria, Illinois and a member of the St. Patrick Society, Spalding Alumni Association, and many other civic organizations in the Peoria area.
