= North Side Historic District (Peoria, Illinois) =

Historic district in Illinois, United States

- U.S. National Register of Historic Places
- U.S. Historic district
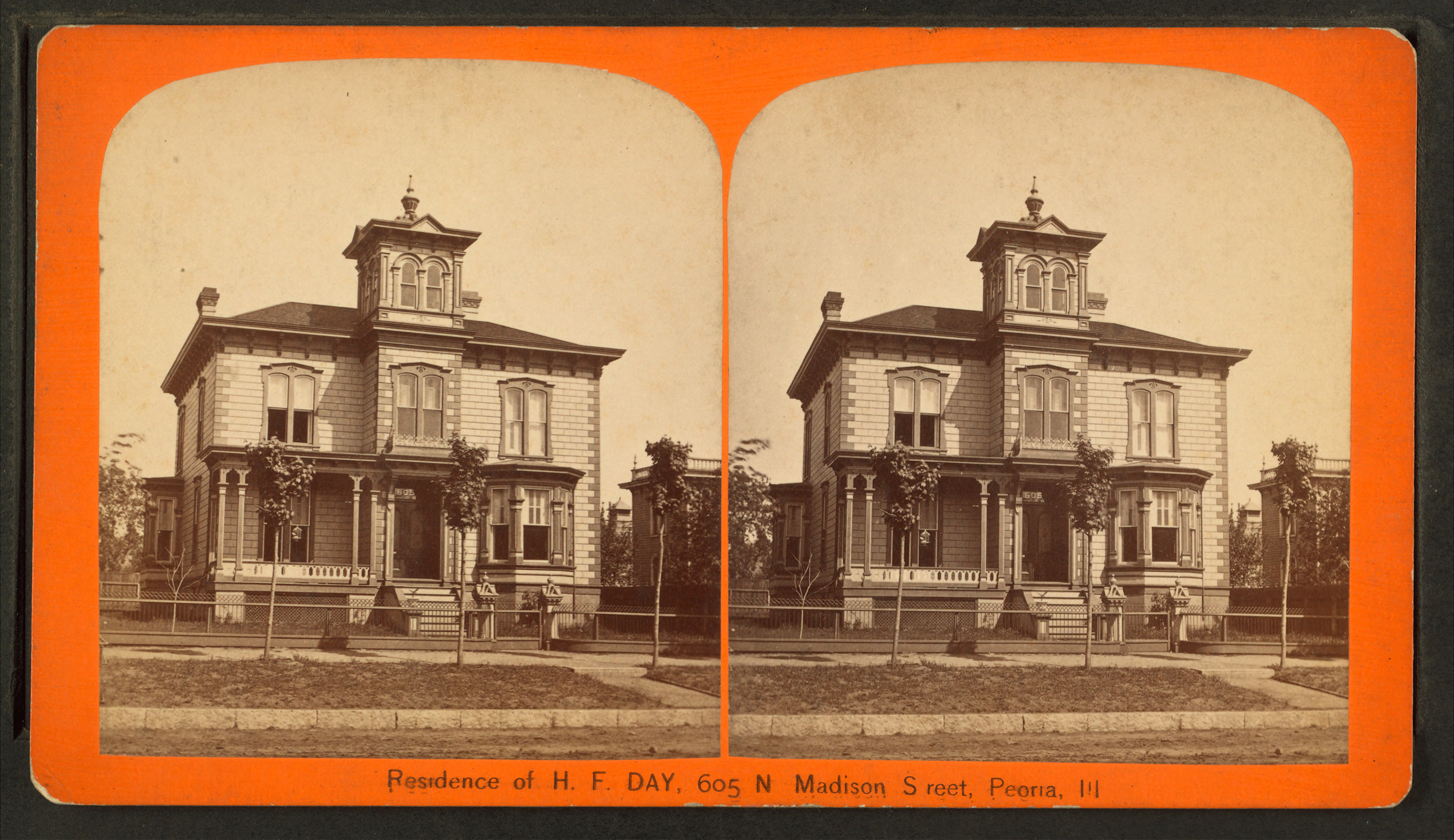
- Stereo card of the H.F. Day house, 605 NE Madison St., in the late 1800s. The house is a contributing property.

- Location within Peoria County, Illinois Location within Illinois
- Location: Roughly bounded by Perry, Caroline, Madison and Fayette Sts., Peoria, Illinois
- Coordinates: 40°42′5″N 89°34′55″W
- Area: 144.2 acres (58.4 ha)
- Built: Various
- Architect: Various
- Architectural style: Second Empire, Queen Anne, Italianate, Cotswold Cottage, Eastlake, Romanesque Revival, Gothic Revival, Norman Revival, Greek Revival, Chateauesque
- NRHP reference No.: 83003588
- Added to NRHP: November 21, 1983

The North Side Historic District is a Registered Historic District in Peoria, Illinois, United States. The district is located on a terrace at the bank of the Illinois River and is predominantly residential. The district was added to the National Register of Historic Places on November 21, 1983. Due to the growth of the city in the 20th century, this original North Side is now in the southeastern quadrant of the city.

There are 213 contributing properties listed on the registration. Among them are:

- the Scottish Rite Cathedral at 400 NE Perry Ave.;
- the Peoria Diocese buildings of the former high schools Spalding Institute and Academy of Our Lady, and adjacent offices and convent in the 400 NE block of Madison St. and 400/500 blocks of Bryan St.;
- American Legion Post #2 at 406 NE Monroe St. (torn down by the Diocese in the late 2000s); and
- St. Mary's Cathedral and its diocesan chancery at 607 NE Madison St.

== Location ==
The old part of the city of Peoria is built on a series of two terraces. The lower terrace slopes up from the Illinois River bank to a height of 83 feet where it meets the base of the second terrace. The width of the initial terrace varies from 3/4 miles to 1 1/2 miles. The second terrace encompasses a series of bluffs which rise from 75 to 100 feet above the first terrace. The North Side Historic District is located on the initial terrace, to the north of the city's central business district and is primarily residential in nature.

== Boundaries ==
The North Side Historic District is roughly bounded by three Peoria city streets: NE Perry, NE Madison, and Fayette Streets.
