= Academy of Our Lady/Spalding Institute =

- U.S. Historic district – Contributing property
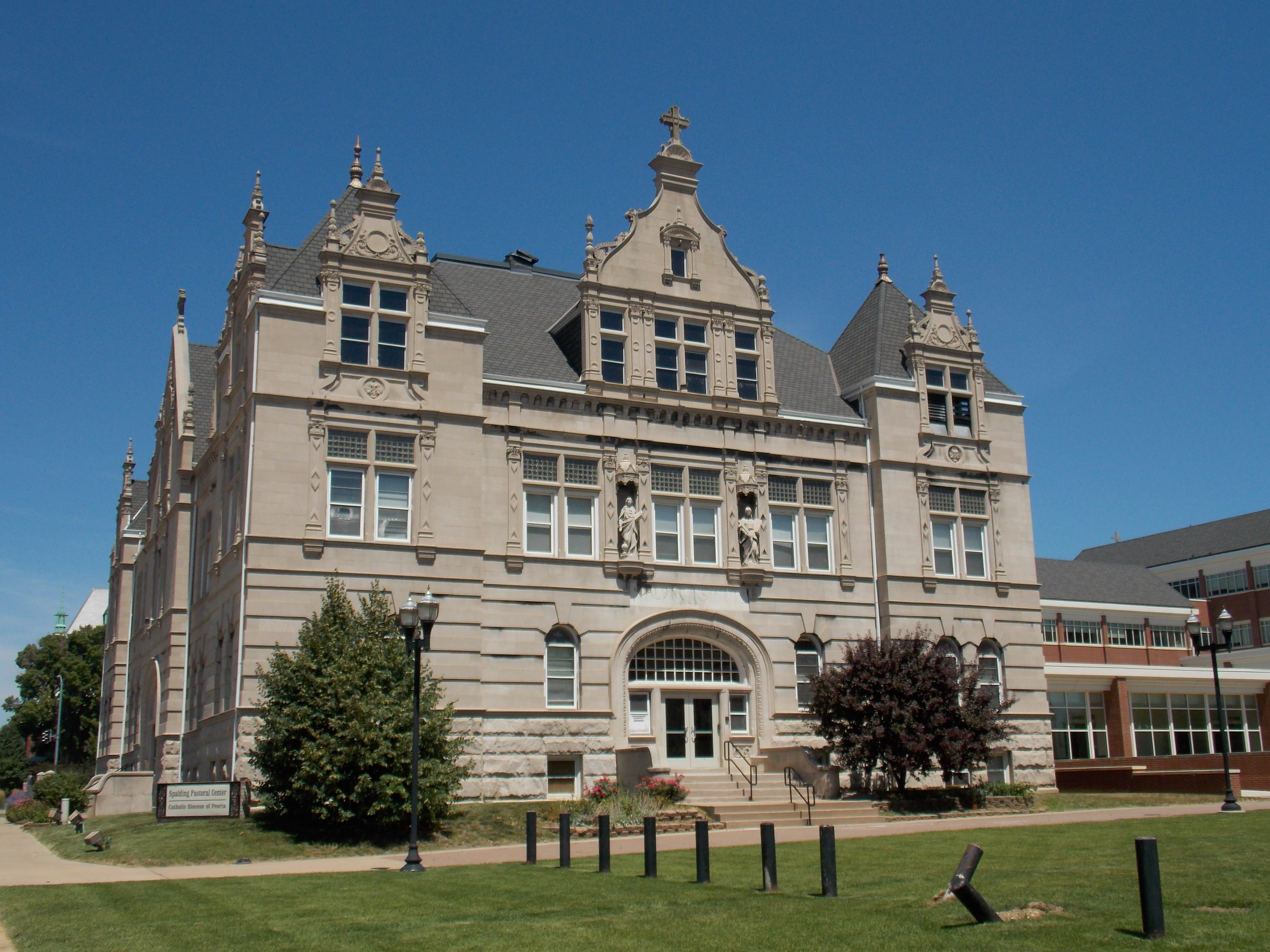
- Spalding Institute is now part of the Spalding Pastoral Center

- Location within Illinois Location within the United States
- Location: 401 NE Madison Ave. Peoria, Illinois
- Coordinates: 40°41′47.61″N 89°35′16.89″W
- Part of: North Side Historic District (Peoria, Illinois) (ID83003588)
- Added to NRHP: November 21, 1983

Academy of Our Lady and Spalding Institute were Catholic high schools across the street from each other in downtown Peoria, Illinois.

The academy (AOL), a girls' school, traced its lineage back to 1863. The Spalding Institute (SI), the boys' school, was founded in 1899 by the Franciscan Brothers of Mountbellew, Ireland, at the invitation of John Lancaster Spalding, the first Bishop of Peoria. It was one of the communities which left that religious congregation to split off and become part of the Third Order Regular of St. Francis of Penance, based in Rome, Italy.

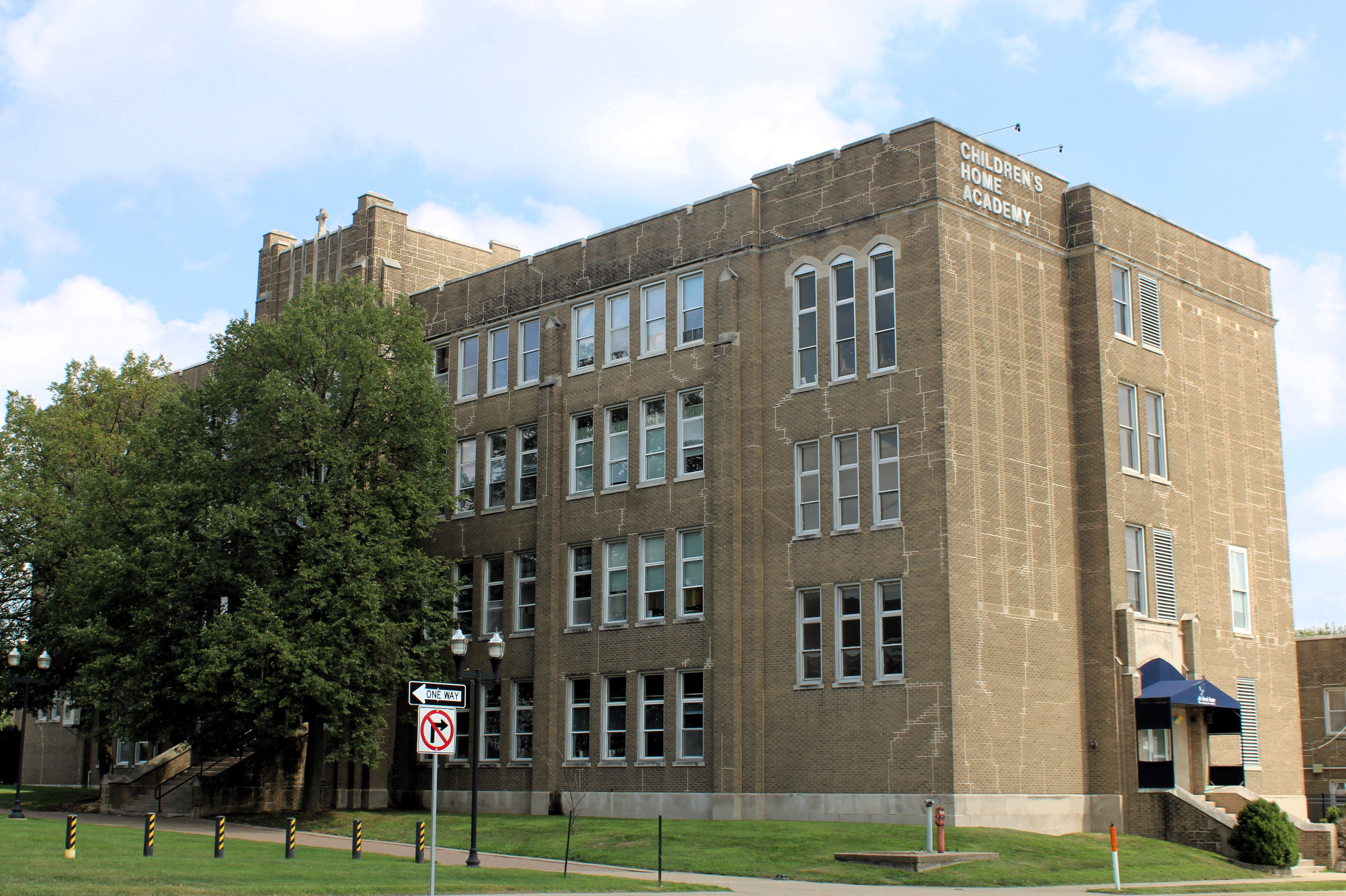
Academy of Our Lady, now the Children's Home Academy

The schools merged into one co-educational school, Academy of Our Lady/Spalding Institute in 1973. AOL/SI (also known as Academy/Spalding) was merged with Bergan High School to form Peoria Notre Dame High School in 1988, and the campus was closed at the end of the 1988–1989 school year.

Father Sweeney School for the Academically Gifted was also housed at the Spalding Institute building until its closure in the early 2000s. Joe Girardi is an alum of both schools, Father Sweeney middle school, and Spalding Institute high school.

Buildings on the campus are contributing properties of the North Side Historic District.

== Notable alumni ==
- Archbishop Fulton J. Sheen (SI, 1913) Venerable Sheen to be beatified; in his bio he recalls it run by the Brothers of Mary.
- Archbishop Gerald Thomas Bergan (SI)
- Pete Vonachen (SI)
- General Wayne A. Downing (SI)
- Actor Jim Jordan (1913)
- Actress Marian Driscoll Jordan (AOL 1915)
- Brigadier General Frank Rezac (SI, 1962)
- Congressman and U.S. Transportation Secretary Ray LaHood (SI, 1963)
- Congressman Darin LaHood (AOL/SI, 1986)
- USDA chemist Timothy L. Mounts
- Baseball manager Joe Girardi (AOL/SI)
- Jim Ardis (SI, 1977)
