= Woodruff Career and Technical Center =

- The school's official logo, depicting a warrior.

Location
- 1800 NE Perry Avenue; Peoria, Illinois 61603; United States; 40.7084°N 89.572°W

Information
- School type: Public high school
- Established: 1937
- School district: Peoria Public Schools District 150
- Superintendent
- CEEB code: 143-450
- Principal: Michael Kuhn
- Grades: K–12
- Gender: Coed
- Enrollment: 933
- Campus: Urban
- Colors: Blue and Gold
- Song: "Woodruff Loyalty"
- Fight song: "U! Rah! Rah! Rah!"
- Athletics conference: Mid-State 6
- Nickname: Warriors
- Yearbook: Talisman
- Information: +1 309-672-6665
- Website: www.psd150.org/Domain/65
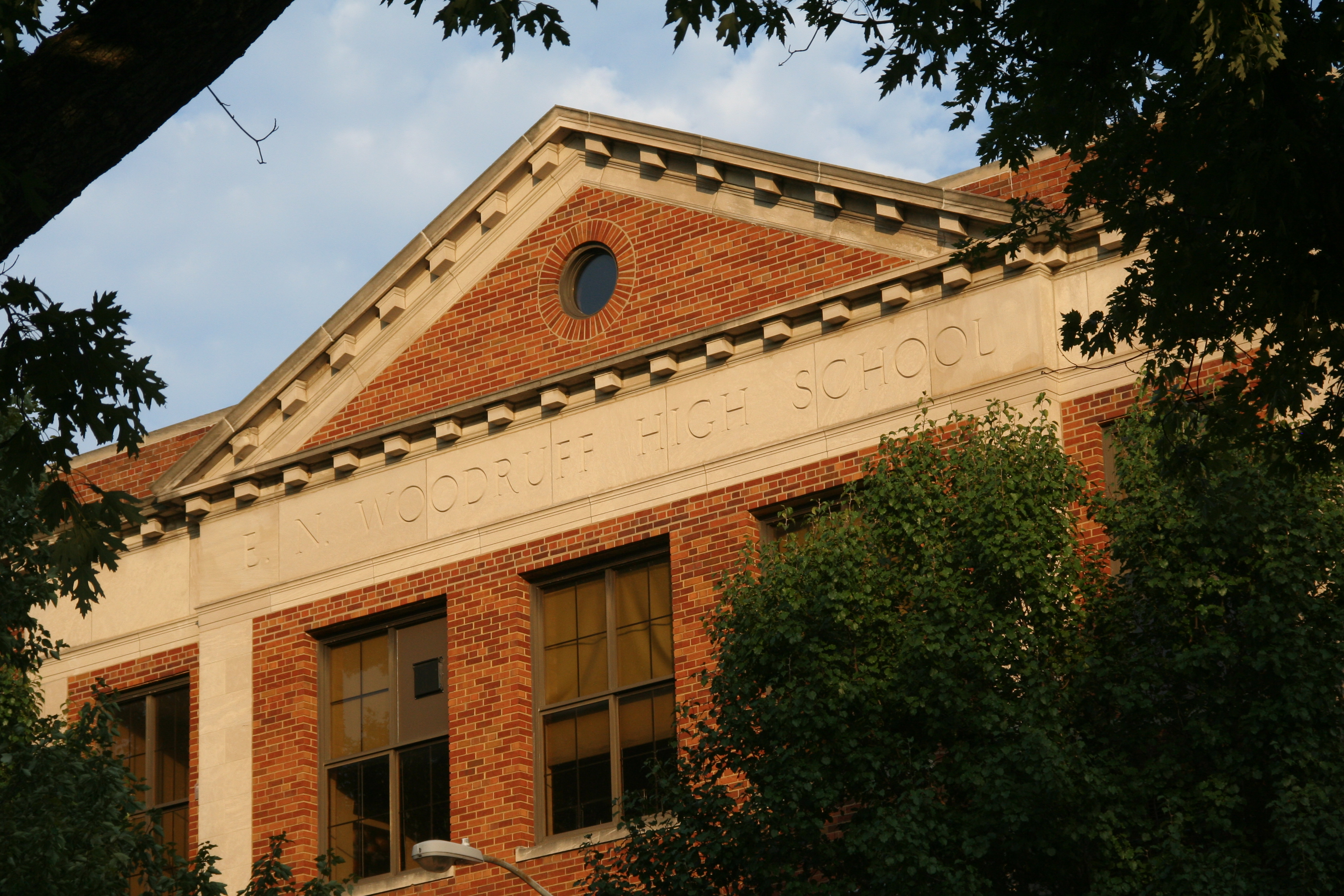

Woodruff Career and Technical Center is a public vocational school located in Peoria, Illinois. Until 2010, it was a standard comprehensive high school known as E. N. Woodruff High School, and was more commonly known as Woodruff High School or simply Woodruff. The original high school opened in 1937 and was closed for one school year (2010–2011), reopening as a specialized high school with its current name.

== History ==
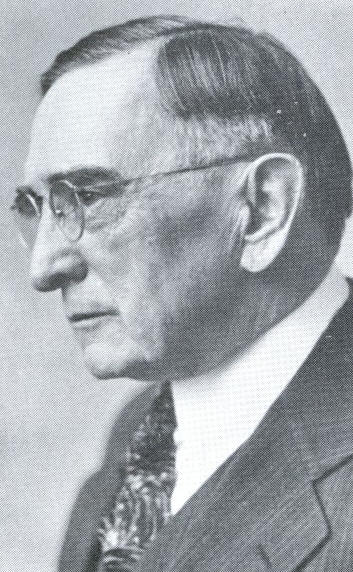
E. N. Woodruff

Woodruff opened in 1937 replacing Kingman High School. (Kingman had formerly been named Averyville High School, prior to Peoria's annexation of Averyville in 1927.) The school was named after Edward Nelson Woodruff, who served as mayor of Peoria off and on from 1903 to 1945.

The Woodruff campus was built at 1800 Northeast Perry Avenue; on what was called the North Side when the school was built, but is now in the northeast part of the city. Perry Avenue was removed in front of the school during expansion of the high school in the late 1970s, but the school's address was not changed.

On September 21, 2009, District 150 voted to close Woodruff High School, effective with the 2010-2011 school year. The vote was 4-3. Students were moved to the other three high schools in Peoria: Manual, Peoria (Central) or Richwoods.

The school only remained closed for one year. For the 2011–2012, it was re-opened as the Woodruff Career and Technical Center, a specialized high school with vocational training.

== Extra-curricular activities ==
=== Athletics ===
Woodruff's athletic teams competed in the Mid-State 6 Conference, along with the three other high schools in Peoria Public Schools District 150. It is a member of the Illinois High School Association (IHSA), which governs most sports and activities in Illinois. The school's sports teams were known as the Warriors, and the colors were blue and gold.

The following teams qualified for their respective IHSA State tournament or meet:

- Baseball: 2nd Place (1946–47)
- Basketball (Men's): Qualified (1938–39, 1950–51)
- Cross-Country (Men's): 10th Place (1946–47); 9th Place (1947–48, 1956–57); 4th Place (1949–50, 1950–51, 1953–54); 3rd Place (1951–52); 2nd Place (1954–55); State Champions (1952–53)
- Football: Qualified (1978–79, 1986–87, 1987–88, 2006–07, 2007–08, 2008–09)
- Golf (Men's): Qualified (1956–57); 5th Place (1938–39)
- Track and Field (Men's): 5th Place (1908–09)*

*as Averyville High School

=== Clubs and activities ===
The following clubs and teams qualified for their respective IHSA State competition or tournament:

- Drama: 9th Place (1978–79, 1988–89); 8th Place (1979–80); 7th Place (1981–82, 1983–84, 1985–86, 1987–88); 6th Place (1982–83); 5th Place (1949–50, 1958–59); 2nd Place (1965–66)
- Group Interpretation: Qualified (1986–87, 1989–90, 1990–91, 1991–92, 1996–97); 7th Place (1983–84)
- Scholastic Bowl: Qualified (1986–87, 1991–92)
- IMEA All State Jazz Band: (1986 - first in school history, 1987) Tim Harr, Guitarist

== Notable alumni ==
- Dan Fogelberg, international best-selling musician, for whom the street in front of the school has been renamed
- James Taylor, former NFL player for the New Orleans Saints

== Principals ==
- L. R. McDonald (1937–1969)
- John P. Wilkinson (1969–1977)
- Dr. Russell McDavid (1977–1982)
- David Barnwell (1982–2000)
- Hershel Hannah (2000-2004)
- Teri Dunn (2004–2010)
