= Edward Nelson Woodruff =

American politician

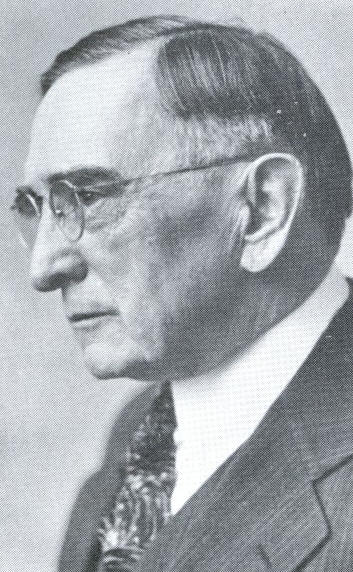

26th Mayor of Peoria
- In office 1903–1905
- Preceded by: William Frederick Bryan Jr.
- Succeeded by: Allen B. Tolson
- In office 1909–1921
- Preceded by: Thomas O'Connor
- Succeeded by: Victor P. Michel
- In office 1923–1925
- Preceded by: Victor P. Michel
- Succeeded by: Louis Mueller
- In office 1929–1931
- Preceded by: Louis Mueller
- Succeeded by: Homer L. Ahrends
- In office 1935–1937
- Preceded by: Charles Leo O'Brien
- Succeeded by: David Hugh McClugage
- In office 1941–1945
- Preceded by: David Hugh McClugage
- Succeeded by: Carl Triebel

Personal details
- Born: February 2, 1862 Peoria, Illinois, US
- Died: December 22, 1947 (aged 85) Peoria, Illinois, US
- Party: Republican
- Spouse: Anna Schmidt

Edward Nelson Woodruff (1862-1947) was an American politician from Peoria, Illinois, who served as that city's longest serving mayor. First elected in 1903 for a two-year term, Woodruff was a Republican. He served in that position for 24 years non-consecutively.

== Early life ==
Woodruff was born on February 2, 1862, to Nelson Lot and Mary Ann (Monroe) Woodruff. His father owned the Woodruff Ice Company, which Edward would later take over and make a small fortune from. Woodruff was married to Anna Schmidt for more than forty years. They had one daughter, Mary, who took care of Woodruff after the death of his wife.

== Political career ==
Woodruff began his career in elected office as alderman for the 1st ward for two terms starting in 1899. Peoria historian Norm Kelley said it was in this first position that Woodruff learned how to effectively spar with his political adversaries. After serving as Alderman, he was elected mayor for the first time in 1903 and was subsequently reelected to two-year terms in 1909, 1911, 1913, 1915, 1917, 1919, 1923, 1929 and 1935. His last reelection victory in 1941 was for his only four-year term.

Some of his achievements included the construction of the First National Bank Building, the Pere Marquette Hotel, the Peoria Municipal Tuberculosis Sanitarium, the City Garbage Department Building and the long awaited Cedar Street Bridge. He also improved the conditions of the police and fire departments, widened Jefferson Street, added almost 40 miles of paved sidewalks and established Eckwood Park. Woodruff built a political machine through patronage, telling reporters, "The boys that can deliver the votes are the boys that get the jobs." He would often conduct the business of this machine at his beached house boat known as the "Bum Boat" located north of Peoria along the Illinois River near Rome, Illinois.

Woodruff unsuccessfully sought the Republican nomination for Governor of Illinois in 1920. He finished third in a four-way primary, garnering just 4.26% of the vote. The only county Woodruff was able to win was his native Peoria County where he won 45.98% of the vote.

== Death ==
Woodruff died on December 22, 1947, after battling an illness for three months. He was buried at his family's plot at Springdale Cemetery.

== Legacy ==
Woodruff Career and Technical Center, formerly known as E.N. Woodruff High School, was named in his honor. The school adopted one of Woodruff's many nicknames as their mascot, the "Woodruff Warriors".

== See also ==
- List of mayors of Peoria, Illinois
