= Bergan High School (Peoria, Illinois) =

Defunct Catholic high school in Peoria, Illinois, USA

Coordinates: 40.7493°N 89.6043°W

Information
- School type: Catholic high school
- Established: 1964
- Closed: 1 June 1988
- Oversight: Roman Catholic Diocese of Peoria

Bergan High School was a Catholic high school in Peoria, Illinois. It was founded in 1964 by the Roman Catholic Diocese of Peoria in what was then the northern part of the city. The school was named after Archbishop of Omaha Gerald Thomas Bergan, a Peoria native. Peoria already had Catholic high schools at the time in Spalding Institute and the Academy of Our Lady High School, located near downtown Peoria.

The school was originally run by the Christian Brothers, but they left the school in 1979. Monsignor Steven Rohlfs, later rector of Mount St. Mary's Seminary, served as chaplain of the high school after their departure.

In 1988, Bergan merged in Academy of Our Lady/Spalding Institute and became Peoria Notre Dame High School.

== Notable alumni ==
- Dave Alwan - ABC TV Shark Tank winner
- Tom Gilles - Major League Baseball pitcher
- Michael C. Maibach - the first American elected to public office under 21 years of age in U.S. history (April 12, 1972), former Vice President of the Intel Corporation (1983–2001) and former President & CEO of the European American Business Council (2003–2012).
- Bart Shatto - Broadway actor
- Suzie Tuffey - NCAA cross country champion
