= Joe Girardi =

American baseball player and manager (born 1964)

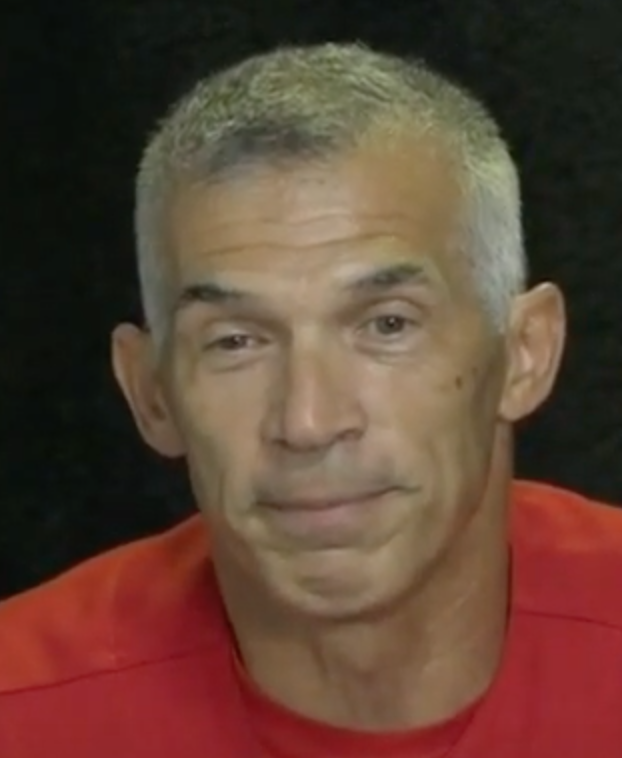
- Girardi in 2020
- Catcher / Manager
- Born: October 14, 1964 (age 62); Peoria, Illinois, U.S.
- Batted: Right Threw: Right

MLB debut
- April 4, 1989, for the Chicago Cubs

Last MLB appearance
- September 28, 2003, for the St. Louis Cardinals

MLB statistics
- Batting average: .267
- Home runs: 36
- Runs batted in: 422
- Managerial record: 1,120–935
- Winning %: .545
- Stats at Baseball Reference
- Managerial record at Baseball Reference

Teams
- As player: Chicago Cubs (1989–1992); Colorado Rockies (1993–1995); New York Yankees (1996–1999); Chicago Cubs (2000–2002); St. Louis Cardinals (2003); As manager: Florida Marlins (2006); New York Yankees (2008–2017); Philadelphia Phillies (2020–2022); As coach: New York Yankees (2005)

Career highlights and awards
- All-Star (2000); 4× World Series champion (1996, 1998, 1999, 2009); NL Manager of the Year (2006)

Joseph Elliott Girardi (born October 14, 1964) is an American sports broadcaster and former professional baseball player and manager in Major League Baseball (MLB). Girardi played the catcher position for the Chicago Cubs, Colorado Rockies, New York Yankees, and St. Louis Cardinals during a big league playing career that spanned from 1989 to 2003. He won three World Series championships with the Yankees in the 1990s and served as the catcher for both Dwight Gooden's no-hitter and David Cone's perfect game.

Girardi became the Yankees' bench coach in 2005. In 2006, he managed the Florida Marlins and was named the National League (NL) Manager of the Year, but was fired after just one season with the team. Girardi managed the Yankees from 2008 to 2017, winning the 2009 World Series over the Phillies. He served as a color analyst for MLB Network and Fox Sports for two years before being named manager of the Philadelphia Phillies in October 2019; he was fired midway through their 2022 pennant season. He has also served as an analyst for Cubs telecasts on the Marquee Sports Network and for Yankees telecasts on the YES Network.

== Early life ==
Girardi, the third son of Jerry, a former blue collar worker and United States Air Force veteran, and Angela Girardi, was born in Peoria, Illinois and grew up in East Peoria, Illinois. He attended high school at the Spalding Institute.

== College career ==
Girardi enrolled at Northwestern University in Evanston, Illinois, where he attended from 1983 through 1986. He played for the Northwestern Wildcats baseball team, where he was a two-time All Big Ten selection and a three-time Academic All-American. In 1984, he played collegiate summer baseball with the Cotuit Kettleers of the Cape Cod Baseball League and was named a league all-star. In 1986, he earned a bachelor of science degree in industrial engineering and was awarded the Big Ten Medal of Honor, which recognizes one male and one female student from the graduating class of each Big Ten member school for demonstrating joint athletic and academic excellence throughout their college career. He was the first freshman to be elected president of a fraternity (Alpha Tau Omega) at Northwestern.

== Professional career ==
=== Draft and minor leagues ===
The Chicago Cubs drafted Girardi in the fifth round of the 1986 MLB draft. He spent four seasons in the Cubs minor leagues system before making his major league debut. In 1986, Girardi batted .309 in 68 games with the Peoria Chiefs of the Midwest League. In 1989, he also played for the Águilas del Zulia in the Venezuelan Winter League.

=== Chicago Cubs (1989–1992) ===
Girardi made his Major League debut for the Cubs on April 4, 1989. During his rookie year with the Cubs, Girardi batted .248 with a home run and 14 runs batted in (RBIs) in 59 games played. In 1990, he played in 133 games, batting .270 with a home run and 38 RBIs. In 1991, he played in only 21 games, batting .191 with 6 RBIs. In 1992, he played in 91 games, batting .270 with a home run and 12 RBIs.

=== Colorado Rockies (1993–1995) ===
The Cubs left Girardi unprotected in the 1992 MLB expansion draft and the Colorado Rockies chose him. During his first year with the Rockies in 1993, he played in 86 games batting .290 with five triples, three home runs, and 31 RBIs. In 1994, he played in 93 games batting .276 with four triples, four home runs, and 34 RBIs. In 1995, he played in 125 games batting .262 with a career-high eight home runs and 55 RBIs.

=== New York Yankees (1996–1999) ===
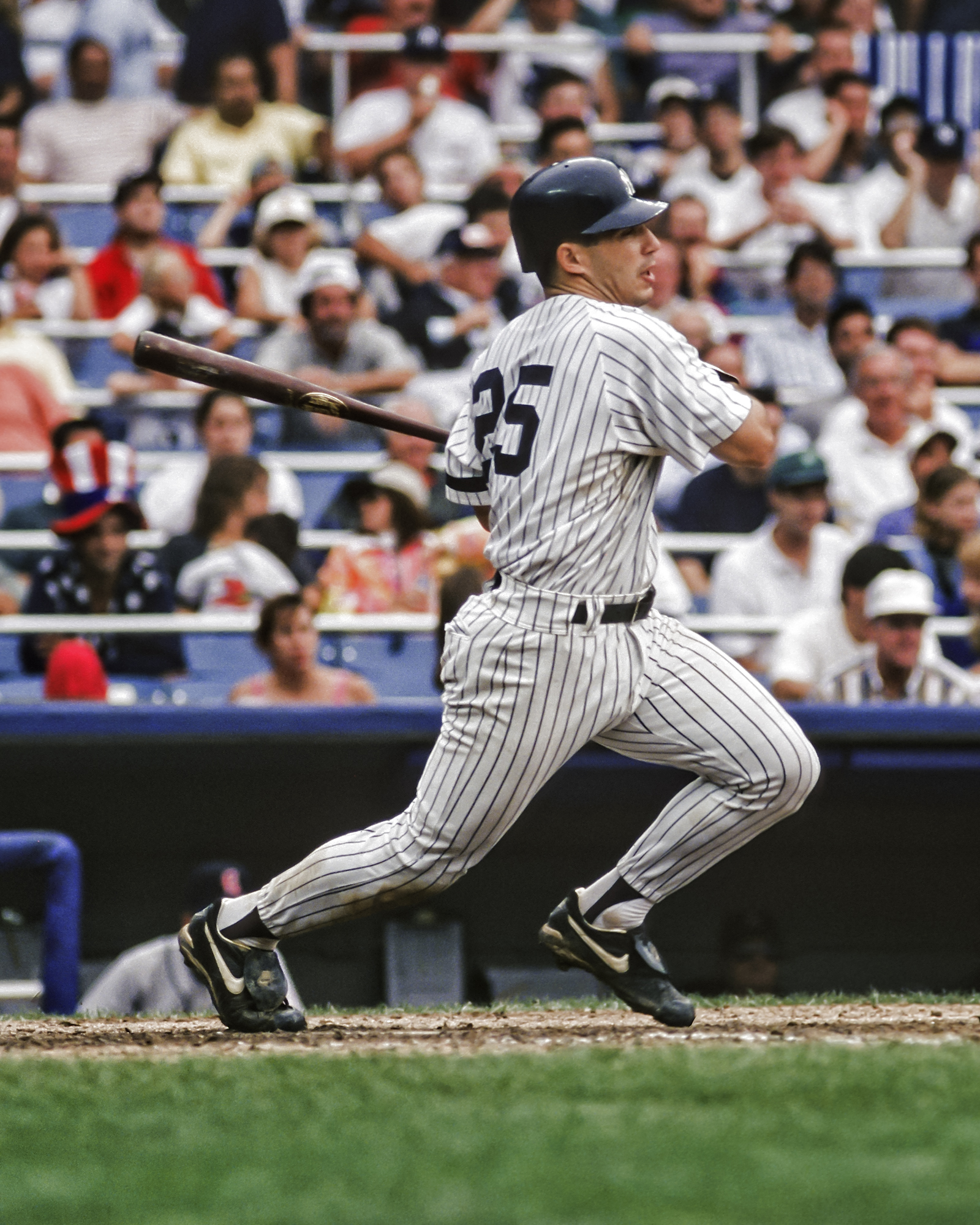
Girardi bats for the Yankees, 1996

After the 1995 season, the New York Yankees acquired Girardi from the Rockies in exchange for pitcher Mike DeJean. Girardi took the place of Mike Stanley. On May 14, 1996, Girardi caught Dwight Gooden's no-hitter. Girardi played in 124 games during the 1996 season, batting .294 with two home runs and 45 RBIs. In Game 6 of the 1996 World Series against the Atlanta Braves, Girardi hit an RBI triple against Greg Maddux that helped the Yankees win that game and ultimately the World Series. When the Yankees made 25-year-old prospect Jorge Posada the backup catcher, Girardi became his mentor. The two catchers split time for the Yankees through 1999. In 1997, Girardi played in 112 games batting .264 with one home run and 50 RBIs. During the World Series-winning 1998 season, he played in 78 games batting .276 with three home runs and 31 RBIs. On July 18, 1999, Girardi caught David Cone's perfect game. During the World Series-winning 1999 season, Girardi played in 65 games batting .239 with two home runs and 27 RBIs.

=== Chicago Cubs (2000–2002) ===
In 2000, Girardi left the Yankees and returned to the Cubs, where he was named to that year's All-Star team, as an injury replacement for Mike Piazza. During the 2000 season, Girardi played in 106 games batting .278 with six home runs and 40 RBIs. In 2001, he played in 78 games batting .253 with three home runs and 25 RBIs. On June 22, 2002, Girardi was asked to speak to the hometown crowd after the Cubs' nationally televised matchup with the St. Louis Cardinals was cancelled by Commissioner Bud Selig, after Cardinals pitcher Darryl Kile was found dead earlier that day. Taking to the field microphone behind home plate, an emotional Girardi fought back tears as he said that "due to a tragedy in the Cardinal family" there would be no game that day. He never specified what had happened, instead asking fans to be respectful of the matter as they found out about it on their own and to pray. Overall, during 2002, Girardi batted .226 with one home run and 26 RBIs in 90 games played.

=== St. Louis Cardinals (2003) ===
On December 16, 2002, Girardi signed a one-year, $750,000 contract with the St. Louis Cardinals. He appeared in just 16 games, accumulating 23 at-bats in which he batted .130 with one RBI and a .361 on-base plus slugging percentage. After signing a contract with the Yankees in spring training 2004, Girardi retired and joined the YES Network.

== Broadcasting and coaching career ==
After a spring training stint with the Yankees in 2004, Girardi retired and became a commentator for the YES Network. He hosted the youth-oriented Yankees on Deck, received good reviews and was offered a larger role on 2005 Yankee broadcasts, however he rejected that offer, as well as an offer from the Florida Marlins to become their bench coach with a guarantee to become the team's manager in 2006, although subsequently was appointed to that job. Instead, he became the Yankees' bench coach. He managed a game during a Joe Torre suspension, a loss to the Kansas City Royals. Girardi remained the host of Kids on Deck in 2005, having shot his shows before spring training. During games, YES promoted Kids on Deck by showing Girardi sitting in the dugout during breaks in the game.

Girardi was a broadcaster for the third, fourth, and fifth games of the 2006 World Series for Fox as part of the network's pregame and postgame team, along with host Jeanne Zelasko and regular analyst Kevin Kennedy. After fielding managerial offers for the 2007 season, Girardi instead came to terms with the YES Network to return to the broadcast booth for 60-plus games as a Yankees analyst and to co-host a new show on the network, Behind The Plate, with John Flaherty, also a former Yankees catcher. Girardi also served as a color commentator for the No. 2 booth (usually with Thom Brennaman) on Major League Baseball on Fox. In 2018, he joined MLB Network as an analyst. In August 2022, he joined Marquee Sports Network as a part-time analyst for Chicago Cubs telecasts. On June 8, 2023, Girardi was offered a managerial position by the University of Central Florida. However, he rejected the job offer in favor of remaining a color commentator for the Chicago Cubs' broadcast. In February 2024, he returned to the YES Network to work as an analyst for Yankees games beginning in the 2024 season.

== Managerial career ==
=== Florida Marlins (2006) ===
After the 2005 regular season, Girardi was named the manager of the Marlins, replacing Jack McKeon. His first notable action as manager was to prohibit facial hair, a policy similar to that of Yankees owner George Steinbrenner.

The team had a 78–84 record with Girardi as manager, and was in wild-card contention even though the team had the lowest payroll in Major League Baseball. At $15 million, the Marlins' 2006 payroll was lower than the salaries of several MLB players. However, Girardi was nearly fired on August 6 when he got into an argument with Marlins owner Jeffrey Loria during a game. According to witnesses and video footage, the Marlins owner was heckling home plate umpire Larry Vanover. When the umpire warned Girardi about the harassment, Girardi and his bench coach Gary Tuck then turned to Loria and told him to stop. Team executives had to talk Loria out of his stated desire to fire Girardi immediately after that game.

On October 3, 2006, the Marlins announced they had fired Girardi as manager, and replaced him with Atlanta Braves third base coach Fredi González. Girardi said only that he appreciated the opportunity to manage the club. Girardi was thought to be among the leading candidates to replace New York Yankees manager Joe Torre after they lost in the 2006 American League Division Series, but Torre remained with the team. Girardi was also a candidate for the manager position with the Chicago Cubs, to succeed Dusty Baker; he interviewed for the job just days after leaving the Marlins. With his playing experience in Chicago, he was considered a front-runner for the position. However, the Cubs chose to go with veteran manager Lou Piniella. Girardi took himself out of the running for the Washington Nationals' managerial job shortly thereafter and returned to the broadcast booth for the YES Network in 2007. He said taking another managerial job would have meant a third move in as many years for his family. Despite Girardi's firing, he was rewarded for his achievements with the Marlins in 2006 with the National League Manager of the Year Award and the Sporting News Manager of the Year Award for the National League.

=== New York Yankees (2008–2017) ===
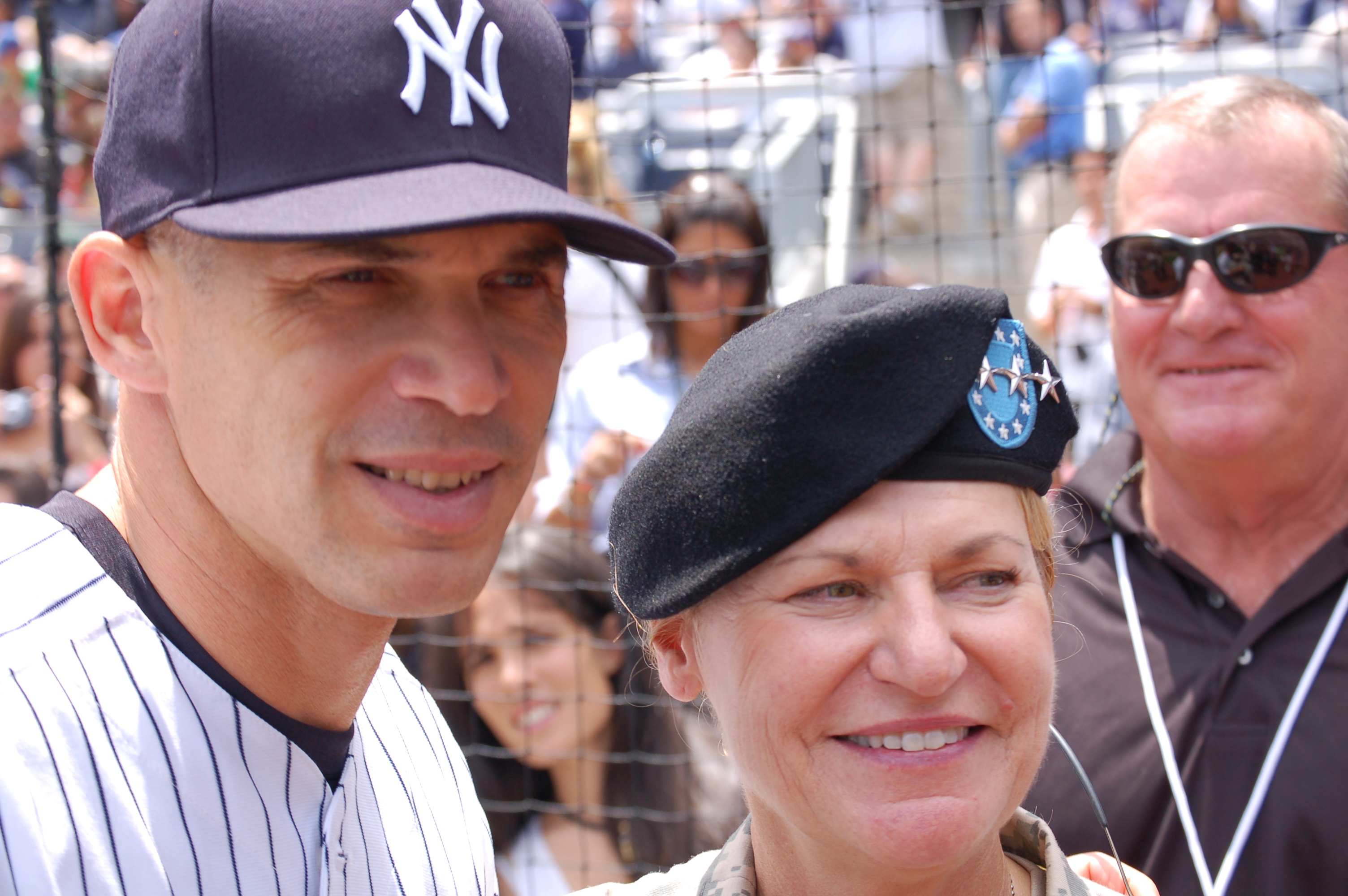
Yankees Manager Joe Girardi with General Ann E. Dunwoody before the N.Y. Mets vs. N.Y. Yankees game, June 14, 2009.

In June 2007, after the Baltimore Orioles fired manager Sam Perlozzo, Girardi interviewed for and was offered the position with the Orioles; he turned it down.

When the Yankees' managerial position became vacant after the 2007 season, the Yankees interviewed Girardi, Tony Peña, and Don Mattingly. On October 29, 2007, Girardi was reported to be the Yankees' choice and the next day he signed a three-year contract, reportedly worth about $7.5 million. Girardi chose to wear number 27 to signify his wish to lead the Yankees to their 27th world championship. Girardi is a health enthusiast and banned sweets such as ice cream and soda in the clubhouse.

On August 2, 2008, Girardi participated in his first Old Timers' Day, the last such game played at the original Yankee Stadium. Girardi participated in the next Old Timer's Day on July 19, 2009, the first in the new Yankee Stadium, as well as every one since then. Girardi's first year as a Yankees manager was unsuccessful as the team was eliminated from postseason contention for the first time since 1993, finishing 2008 with an 89–73 record, third in the AL East.

In 2009, his second year as manager, the Yankees were a much improved team. He led the Yankees to their 40th AL pennant and their 27th World Series title (defeating the Philadelphia Phillies), his first World Series title as manager and the Yankees' first since 2000.

Before the 2010 season, Girardi changed his number to 28. Newly acquired center-fielder Curtis Granderson had worn 28, but agreed to change his number to 14.

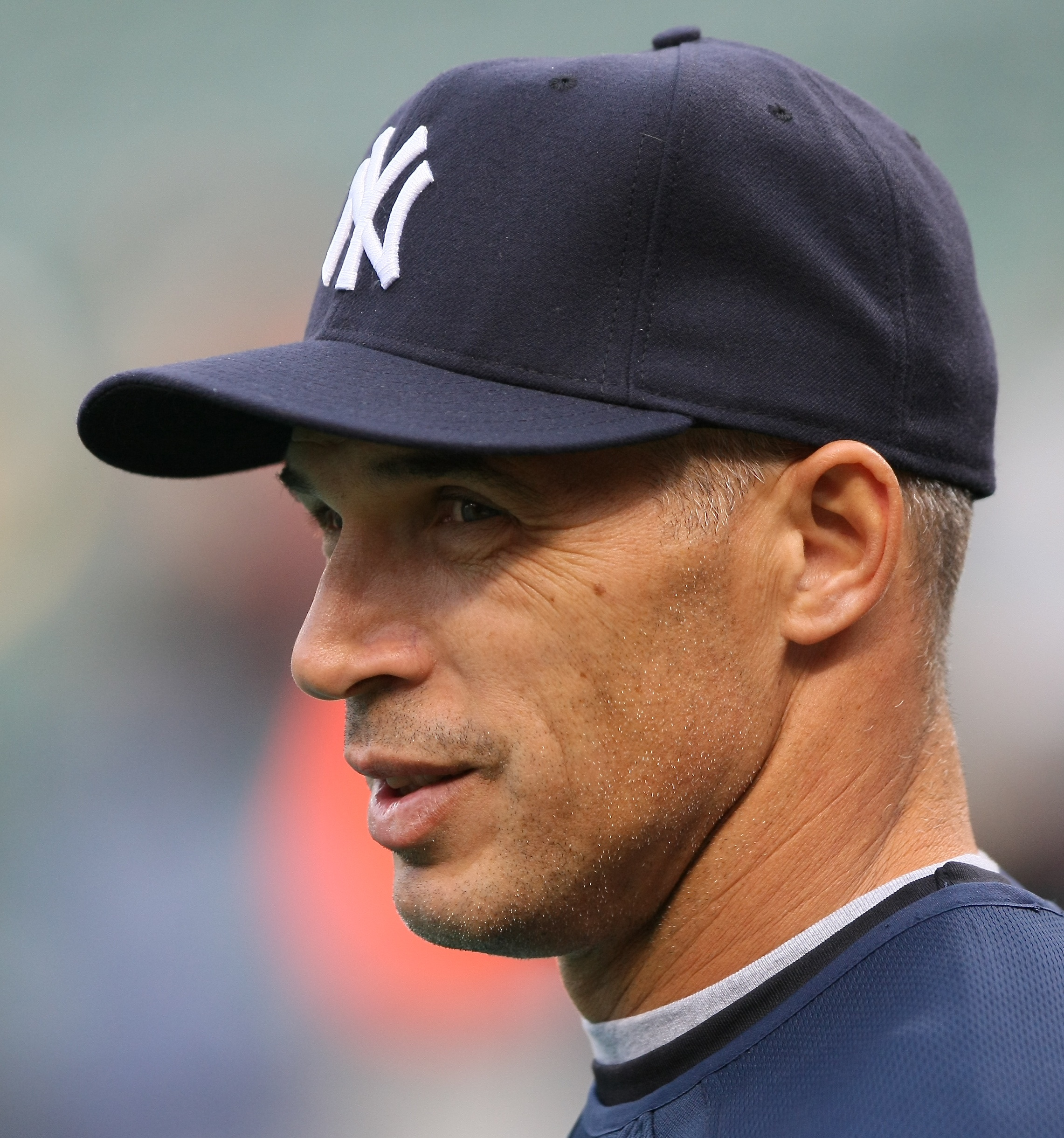
Girardi as manager of the Yankees

Following the 2010 season, Girardi and the Yankees agreed to a three-year deal to keep him as the Yankees' manager.

The Yankees' 2011 season was plagued by injuries that caused disabled list stints for several key players. Despite the setbacks, Girardi managed to lead the team to the AL East title. Rob Parker of ESPN commended Girardi's performance and felt his efforts were deserving of American League Manager of the Year, but felt he would not get the award due to the Yankees high payroll and what Parker alleges is an anti-Yankee bias. The Yankees were defeated by the Detroit Tigers 3–2 in the divisional round.

On June 15, 2012, Girardi won his 500th game as a manager. The Yankees reached the playoffs and defeated the Baltimore Orioles 3–2 in the ALDS, but were swept by the Detroit Tigers in the ALCS on October 18, 2012. Girardi's 2013 season was marred by numerous player injuries and controversies, resulting in the Yankees finishing 85–77 (tied 3rd in AL East) and missing the postseason for the first time since 2008.

On October 10, 2013, Girardi signed a four-year deal worth $16 million to remain as manager of the New York Yankees.

In 2014 the Yankees finished 84–78, (second place in AL East) and did not qualify for the postseason for the second straight year. In 2015, the Yankees finished 87–75, (second place again in AL East), clinching the top wild card spot which marked the team's first playoff appearance since 2012, but they lost to the Houston Astros in the 2015 American League Wild Card Game. On May 21, 2016, Girardi managed his 1,500th game.

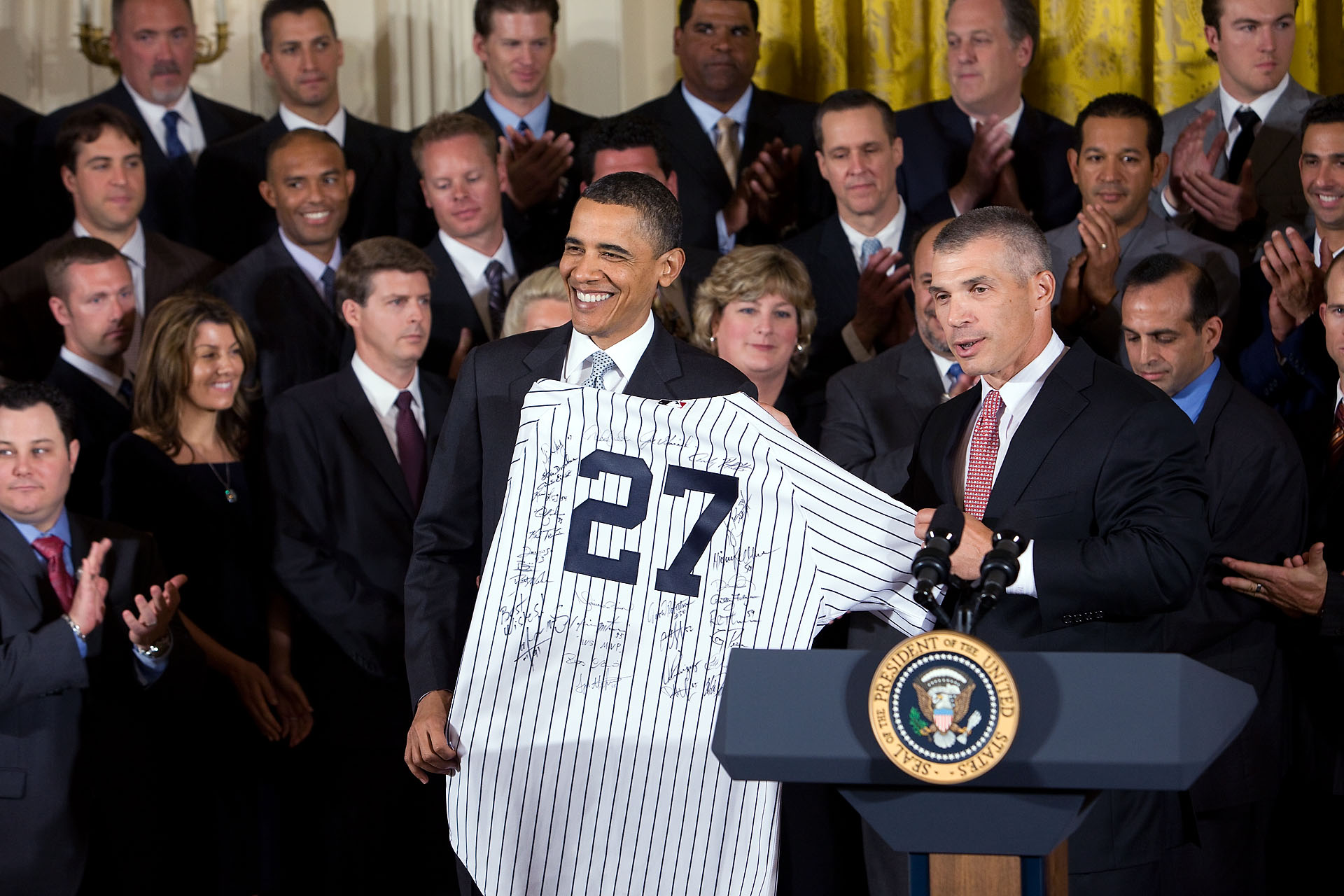
Joe Girardi presents President Barack Obama with a New York Yankees signed team jersey during the Yankees trip to the White House.

After missing the playoffs again in 2016, the Yankees finished 91–71 in 2017, second place in the AL East, and qualified for the postseason as the first Wild Card team in the AL. In 2017 he was successful on a higher percentage of replay challenges than any other MLB manager with 10 or more challenges, at 75.0%. The Yankees beat the Twins, 8–4, in the wild card game and advanced to the ALDS, where they played the Cleveland Indians. After falling behind 0–2, amidst a controversial decision to not challenge a potential hit-by-pitch, Girardi's Yankees rallied back to win three games in a row and faced the Houston Astros in the ALCS. The series began in Houston, and after again falling behind 0–2, the team won all three games at Yankee Stadium, but the season ended after losing Games 6 and 7 back in Houston. Afterward, Girardi's contract expired and on October 26, the Yankees announced he would not return as manager, being replaced by Aaron Boone.

=== Philadelphia Phillies (2020–2022) ===
On August 7, 2019, he became the United States national baseball team manager at the 2019 WBSC Premier12. But, on October 16, 2019, he canceled so that he could seek managerial opportunities in Major League Baseball.

On October 24, 2019, the Philadelphia Phillies hired Girardi as their manager, replacing Gabe Kapler. In his first season with Philadelphia, Girardi's management resulted in the worst season ERA for any bullpen since 1930. The Phillies missed the playoffs by one game, also finishing behind Kapler's San Francisco Giants in the standings. In his second season with Philadelphia, the Phillies had the most blown saves by any team in MLB history. The Phillies again barely missed the playoffs, eliminated with three days left in the 2021 season. Meanwhile, the Giants won the most games in franchise history, earning Kapler the 2021 Manager of the Year Award.

On June 3, 2022, the Phillies fired Girardi after the team started the season with a 22–29 record. After firing Girardi, the Phillies won 14 of their next 16 games and went on to win the National League pennant.

=== Managerial record ===
As of games played on June 1, 2022

Team	Year	Regular season					Postseason			
Team	Year	Games	Won	Lost	Win %	Finish	Won	Lost	Win %	Result
FLA	2006	162	78	84	.481	4th in NL East	–	–	–	
FLA total		162	78	84	.481		–	–	–	
NYY	2008	162	89	73	.549	3rd in AL East	–	–	–	
NYY	2009	162	103	59	.636	1st in AL East	11	4	.733	Won World Series (PHI)
NYY	2010	162	95	67	.586	2nd in AL East	5	4	.556	Lost ALCS (TEX)
NYY	2011	162	97	65	.599	1st in AL East	2	3	.400	Lost ALDS (DET)
NYY	2012	162	95	67	.586	1st in AL East	3	6	.333	Lost ALCS (DET)
NYY	2013	162	85	77	.525	3rd in AL East	–	–	–	
NYY	2014	162	84	78	.519	2nd in AL East	–	–	–	
NYY	2015	162	87	75	.537	2nd in AL East	0	1	.000	Lost ALWC (HOU)
NYY	2016	162	84	78	.519	4th in AL East	–	–	–	
NYY	2017	162	91	71	.562	2nd in AL East	7	6	.538	Lost ALCS (HOU)
NYY total		1,620	910	710	.562		28	24	.538	
PHI	2020	60	28	32	.467	3rd in NL East	–	–	–	
PHI	2021	162	82	80	.506	2nd in NL East	–	–	–	
PHI	2022	51	22	29	.431	Fired	–	–	–	
PHI total		273	132	141	.484		–	–	–	
Total		2,055	1,120	935	.545		28	24	.538	

== Personal life ==
Girardi and his wife Kim Innocenzi-Girardi live in Purchase, New York, and have three children. Girardi is of Sicilian descent and is a devout Christian.

While driving home after winning the 2009 World Series, Girardi stopped to help a car crash victim on a dangerous blind curve of the Cross County Parkway in Eastchester, New York. Police said Girardi put his own life at risk while trying to help the driver who had just crashed into a wall. The driver said she had no idea who Girardi was until the responding officers identified him. The next day, Girardi said, "I think the most important thing is that, obviously, there's a lot of joy in what we do, but we can't forget to be human beings when we help others out."

On October 6, 2012, during the 2012 ALDS against the Baltimore Orioles, Girardi's father Jerry Girardi died at the age of 81. He had Alzheimer's disease and spent the past several years in an assisted care facility. His mother had died from cancer while Joe was a student-athlete at Northwestern University. Joe Girardi has four siblings: John Girardi, George Girardi, Maria Girardi, and Gerald Girardi.

Sporting positions
Preceded by Willie Randolph	New York Yankees Bench Coach; 2005	Succeeded by Lee Mazzilli
